= Dashu =

Dashu may refer to:

- Dashu (solar term) (大暑), the 12th solar term of the traditional Chinese lunisolar calendar
- Dashu District (大樹區), a district of Kaohsiung, Taiwan

== Townships in China ==
- Dashu Township, Gansu (大树乡), in Dongxiang Autonomous County, Gansu
- Dashu Township, Jiangxi (大树乡), in Duchang County, Jiangxi

== Towns in China ==
- Dashu, Anhui (大墅), in Quanjiao County, Anhui
- Dashu, Chongqing (大树), in Fengjie County, Chongqing
- Dashu, Shandong (大束), in Zoucheng, Shandong
- Dashu, Dazhou (大树), in Dazhou, Sichuan
- Dashu, Hanyuan County (大树), in Hanyuan County, Sichuan
- Dashu, Zhejiang (大墅), in Chun'an County, Zhejiang

== See also ==
- Shu (disambiguation) for a list of states in Chinese history called "Da Shu" or "Great Shu"
