= Autonomous administrative divisions of China =

Divisions designated as autonomous within the People's Republic of China

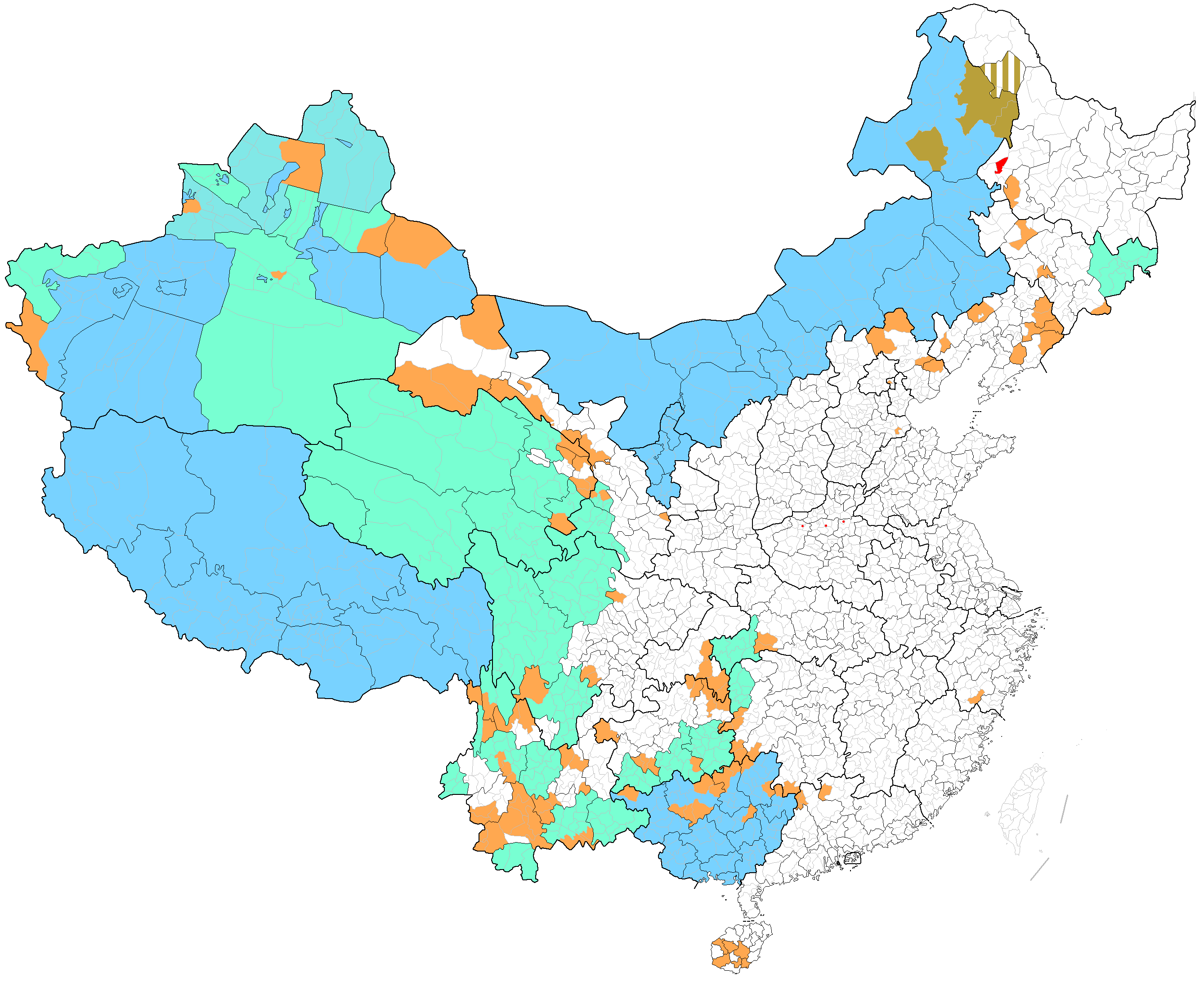
Map of all minority regions under autonomous rule designated by the Central Government Autonomous Region Autonomous Prefecture Autonomous County Autonomous Banner Ethnic district

Chinese autonomous administrative divisions are associated with one or more ethnic minorities that are designated as autonomous within the People's Republic of China. These areas are recognized in the Constitution of China and are nominally given a number of rights not accorded to other administrative divisions of China. For example, Tibetan minorities in autonomous regions are granted rights and support not given to the Han Chinese, such as fiscal and medical subsidies.

== History ==
Autonomous regions, prefectures, counties, and banners were established after communist takeover, following Soviet practice. At first, the nomenclature of these autonomous areas were somewhat confused, with autonomous regions appearing at the province, prefecture, county, and township levels. Eventually the nomenclature was standardized to the conventions used today.

The first autonomous region to be established was Inner Mongolia, created within communist-held territory in 1947, two years before the establishment of the People's Republic. Xinjiang was converted from a province to an autonomous region in 1955. Guangxi and Ningxia followed in 1958, and the Tibet Autonomous Region was formally established in 1965.

== Administrative divisions ==
=== Autonomous regions ===
The PRC's autonomous administrative divisions may be found in the first (or top) to third levels of its national administrative divisions thus:

Level	Type	Chinese	Pinyin	Number as of June 2005
province (1)	Autonomous regions	自治区	Zìzhìqū	5
prefecture (2)	Autonomous prefectures	自治州	Zìzhìzhōu	30
county (3)	Autonomous counties	自治县	Zìzhìxiàn	117
county (3)	Autonomous banners	自治旗	Zìzhìqí	3

=== Statistics ===
Of the five autonomous regions, only Tibet has an absolute majority (>50%) of the designated ethnic group, since Tibetans make up 90% of the population as of 2011. Xinjiang is more ethnically diverse, with the titular Uyghurs making up a plurality at 46%, Han making up 39%, and various other ethnic groups making up the remaining 15% as of 2015. The remaining three autonomous regions have absolute majorities of Han people, the most populous ethnic group in China.

Below is the detailed composition of all autonomous administrative divisions of in various provinces, according to the 'China Statistical Yearbook' (中国统计年鉴, 2013 edition), data as of the end of 2012:

	Provincial-level ethnic autonomous areas	Prefecture-level ethnic autonomous areas			County-level ethnic autonomous areas			Population in ethnic autonomous areas		
	Provincial-level ethnic autonomous areas	Subtotal	Prefecture-level cities	Autonomous prefectures	Subtotal	County-level cities	Autonomous counties (banners)	Total population (10,000)	Ethnic minority population (10,000)	Percentage of ethnic minorities (%)
Nationwide	5	77	31	30	702	68	120	18762.34	9003.47	47.99
Hebei Province					6		6	207.62	124.10	59.77
Inner Mongolia Autonomous Region	1	12	9		101	11	3	2489.85	542.24	21.78
Liaoning Province					8		8	332.33	167.35	50.36
Jilin Province		1		1	11	6	3	333.29	114.20	34.27
Heilongjiang Province					1		1	25.22	5.25	20.82
Zhejiang Province					1		1	17.31	1.91	11.06
Hubei Province		1		1	10	2	2	464.22	264.16	56.90
Hunan Province		1		1	15	1	7	520.65	401.09	77.04
Guangdong Province					3		3	49.56	18.25	36.82
Guangxi Zhuang Autonomous Region	1	14	14		109	7	12	5240.00	1988.00	37.94
Hainan Province					6		6	179.36	91.51	51.02
Chongqing Municipality					4		4	273.79	194.52	71.05
Sichuan Province		3		3	51	1	4	759.54	460.50	60.63
Guizhou Province		3		3	46	4	11	1712.86	1008.02	58.85
Yunnan Province		8		8	78	7	29	2249.73	1272.70	56.57
Tibet Autonomous Region	1	7	1		74	1		308.00	282.84	91.83
Gansu Province		2		2	21	2	7	352.29	207.81	58.99
Qinghai Province		6		6	35	2	7	366.53	238.50	65.07
Ningxia Hui Autonomous Region	1	5	5		21	2		647.19	235.03	36.32
Xinjiang Uygur Autonomous Region	1	14	2	5	101	22	6	2233.00	1385.49	62.05

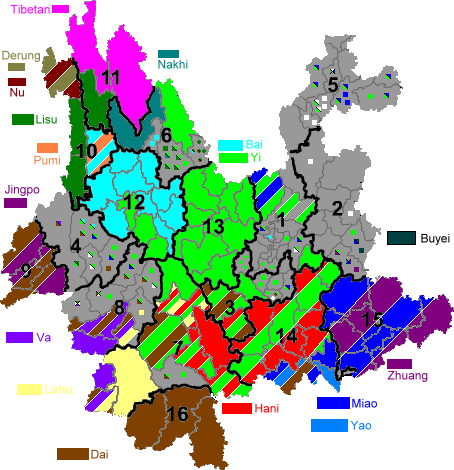
Major Autonomous areas within Yunnan (excluding Hui)

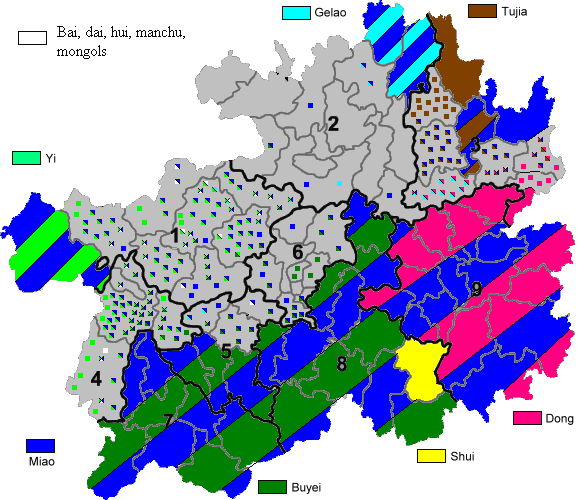
Major Autonomous areas within Guizhou (excluding Hui)

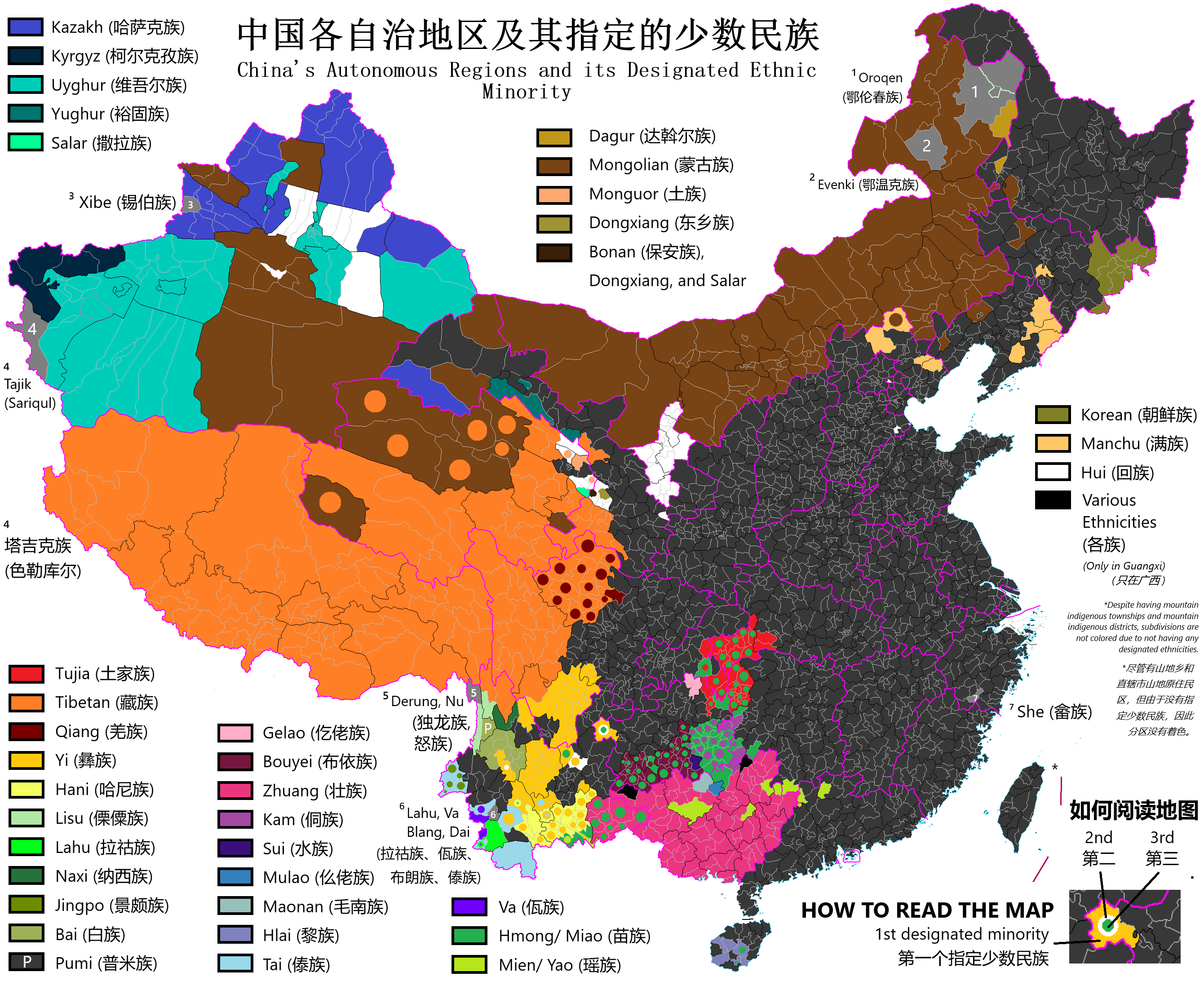
China's Autonomous Regions and their designated ethnic minority

=== Ethnic area ===
Although not named as autonomous areas, some third-level settlements and areas that are identified as county-level cities and county-level districts enjoy the same autonomy as autonomous areas. At the fourth ("township") level, 1 ethnic sum (the Evenk Ethnic Sum) and over 270 ethnic townships also exist, but are not considered to be autonomous and do not enjoy the laws pertaining to the larger ethnic autonomous areas.

Level	Type	Chinese	Pinyin	Number
county (3)	Ethnic districts in City	城市民族区	Chéngshì Mínzú qū	5
township (4)	Ethnic township (Ethnic town)*	民族乡 (民族镇)*	Mínzú xiāng (Mínzú zhèn)*	1,092 township (15 town)
township (4)	Ethnic sum	民族苏木	Mínzú sūmù	1
villages (5)	Ethnic villages (Ethnic gacha)	民族村 (民族嘎查)	Mínzú cūn (Mínzú gāchá)	?

As these autonomous areas were created by the PRC, they are not recognised by the Republic of China on Taiwan which ruled Mainland China before the PRC's creation. However, in 2001, the ROC designated the Taiwanese indigenous areas in southern parts of the island.

== Nomenclature ==
The names of most of the PRC's autonomous areas are made from linking together:

- the name of a geographical area;
- the name or names of the predominant ethnic minority or minorities;
- the word "autonomous"; and
- a type of administrative division.

For instance:

Level	Geographical area	+	Ethnic name/s	+	"Autonomous"	+	Admin. division	=	Result
1	Guangxi	+	Zhuang	+	Autonomous	+	Region	=	Guangxi Zhuang Autonomous Region
2	Ili	+	Kazakh	+	Autonomous	+	Prefecture	=	Ili Kazakh Autonomous Prefecture
3	Changbai	+	Korean	+	Autonomous	+	County	=	Changbai Korean Autonomous County
3	Morin Dawa	+	Daur	+	Autonomous	+	Banner	=	Morin Dawa Daur Autonomous Banner

In the Chinese name of the administrative area, the nationality name always includes the suffix "族" ("nationality"), unless the nationality name consists of more than two syllables (e.g. Xinjiang Uyghur/Wéiwú'ěr AR) or the geographical name contains the nationality name (e.g. Inner Mongolia and Tibet ARs). This distinction is not reflected in translation into English.

Some autonomous areas have more than one specified minority, which tend to be listed in the name of the prefecture, creating rather long names. Two autonomous counties simply use "various nationalities" in their names as placeholders, rather than listing out all of their designated ethnicities:

Full name	Geographical	Nationality	Administrative
Enshi Tujia and Miao Autonomous Prefecture	Enshi	Tujia and Miao	Autonomous Prefecture
Shuangjiang Lahu, Va, Blang and Dai Autonomous County	Shuangjiang	Lahu, Wa, Blang and Dai	Autonomous County
Longlin Pan-Ethnicities Autonomous County	Longlin	Various Ethnicities (Miao, Yi and Gelao)	Autonomous County
Longsheng Pan-Ethnicities Autonomous County	Longsheng	Various Ethnicities (Kam, Yao, Miao)	Autonomous County

A few autonomous areas break the regular nomenclature pattern, because the name of the nationality is already contained within the geographical name, or because there is no geographical name:

Full name	Geographical	Nationality	Administrative
Tibet Autonomous Region	Tibet	(Tibetan)	Autonomous Region
Inner Mongolia Autonomous Region	Inner Mongolia	(Mongol)	Autonomous Region
Dongxiang Autonomous County	—	Dongxiang	Autonomous County
Evenki Autonomous Banner	—	Evenks	Autonomous Banner
Oroqen Autonomous Banner	—	Oroqen	Autonomous Banner

== Legal basis ==
Autonomous regions, prefectures, counties, and banners are covered under Section 6 of Chapter 3 (Articles 111–122) of the Constitution of China, and with more detail under the Law of the People's Republic of China on Regional National Autonomy (《中华人民共和国民族区域自治法》). The constitution states that the head of government of each autonomous areas must be of the ethnic group as specified by the autonomous area (such as Tibetan or Uyghur). The constitution also guarantees a range of rights including: independence of finance, independence of economic planning, independence of arts, science and culture, organization of local police, and use of local language. In addition, the head of government of each autonomous region is known as a "chairman", unlike provinces, where they are known as "governors".
