= Tangwang =

Tangwang may refer to:

- Tangwang County of Yichun, Heilongjiang, China
- Tangwang language, a language spoken in Dongxiang County, Linxia, China
- Tangwang town, a town of Dongxiang County, Linxia, China
