= Zhaoxing =

Zhaoxing (肇兴镇) may refer to:

- Zhaoxing, Guizhou, subdivision and town of Liping County, Guizhou
- Zhaoxing, Heilongjiang (zh), subdivision and town of Luobei County, Heilongjiang
