= Jinfeng Township, Zhejiang =

Jinfeng Township 金峰乡
- Township
- Location in Zhejiang
- Coordinates: 29.6775°N 118.9177°E
- Country: People's Republic of China
- Province: Zhejiang
- Prefecture-level city: Hangzhou
- County: Chun'an County
- Time zone: UTC+8 (China Standard)

Jinfeng Township (simplified Chinese: 金峰乡; traditional Chinese: 金峰鄉; pinyin: Jīnfēng Xiāng) is a township under the administration of Chun'an County, Zhejiang, China. As of 2018, it has 11 villages under its administration.
