= Duchang County =

Duchang County 都昌县
- County
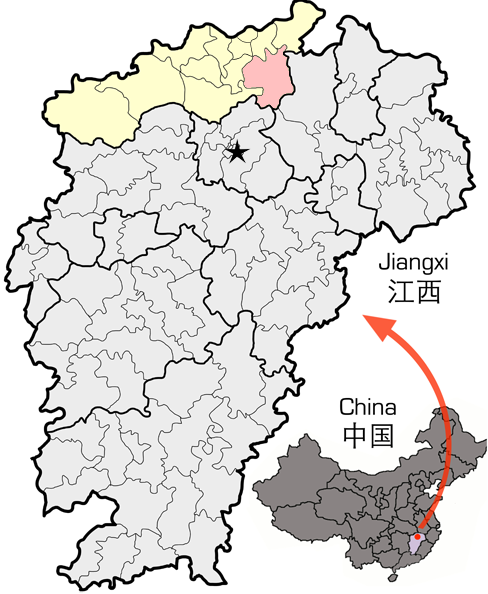
- Location of Duchang County (red) within Jiujiang City (yellow) and Jiangxi
- Coordinates: 29°16′23″N 116°12′14″E
- Country: People's Republic of China
- Province: Jiangxi
- Prefecture-level city: Jiujiang

Area
  - Total: 2,669.5 km^{2} (1,030.7 sq mi)

Population (2018)
  - Total: 816,900
  - Density: 306.0/km^{2} (792.6/sq mi)
- Time zone: UTC+8 (China Standard)
- Postal code: 332600

Duchang (Chinese: 都昌; pinyin: Dūchāng) is a county in the north-northeast of Jiangxi province, People's Republic of China. Containing part of Poyang Lake, it is under the jurisdiction of the prefecture-level city of Jiujiang. The total area is 2,669.53 km^{2} (1,030.71 sq mi), and the population is 813,000.

== Administrative divisions ==
Duchang County has 12 towns and 12 townships.

12 towns

- Duchang (都昌镇)
- Zhouxi (周溪镇)
- Sanchagang (三汊港镇)
- Zhongguan (中馆镇)
- Dasha (大沙镇)
- Wanhu (万户镇)
- Nanfeng (南峰镇)
- Tutang (土塘镇)
- Dagang (大港镇)
- Cailing (蔡岭镇)
- Xubu (徐埠镇)
- Zuoli (左里镇)

12 townships

- Hehe (和合乡)
- Yangfeng (阳峰乡)
- Xiyuan (西源乡)
- Xiangxi (芗溪乡)
- Shishan (狮山乡)
- Mingshan (鸣山乡)
- Chunqiao (春桥乡)
- Sushan (苏山乡)
- Duobao (多宝乡)
- Wangdun (汪墩乡)
- Beishan (北山乡)
- Dashu (大树乡)

== Climate ==
Climate data for Duchang, elevation 78 m (256 ft), (1991–2020 normals, extremes 1981–present)
Month	Jan	Feb	Mar	Apr	May	Jun	Jul	Aug	Sep	Oct	Nov	Dec	Year
Record high °C (°F)	23.1 (73.6)	28.0 (82.4)	32.9 (91.2)	32.8 (91.0)	34.2 (93.6)	36.0 (96.8)	38.8 (101.8)	39.2 (102.6)	37.4 (99.3)	33.6 (92.5)	30.4 (86.7)	21.4 (70.5)	39.2 (102.6)
Mean daily maximum °C (°F)	8.6 (47.5)	11.5 (52.7)	15.6 (60.1)	21.7 (71.1)	26.5 (79.7)	29.0 (84.2)	32.6 (90.7)	32.5 (90.5)	29.2 (84.6)	24.0 (75.2)	17.6 (63.7)	11.3 (52.3)	21.7 (71.0)
Daily mean °C (°F)	5.0 (41.0)	7.6 (45.7)	11.7 (53.1)	17.7 (63.9)	22.6 (72.7)	25.7 (78.3)	29.2 (84.6)	28.8 (83.8)	24.8 (76.6)	19.4 (66.9)	13.2 (55.8)	7.2 (45.0)	17.7 (64.0)
Mean daily minimum °C (°F)	2.4 (36.3)	4.7 (40.5)	8.6 (47.5)	14.4 (57.9)	19.4 (66.9)	23.0 (73.4)	26.4 (79.5)	25.8 (78.4)	21.6 (70.9)	15.9 (60.6)	10.0 (50.0)	4.3 (39.7)	14.7 (58.5)
Record low °C (°F)	−5.5 (22.1)	−6.9 (19.6)	−2.4 (27.7)	3.1 (37.6)	9.2 (48.6)	14.1 (57.4)	18.9 (66.0)	18.7 (65.7)	12.5 (54.5)	4.6 (40.3)	−1.7 (28.9)	−12.1 (10.2)	−12.1 (10.2)
Average precipitation mm (inches)	73.5 (2.89)	93.6 (3.69)	150.6 (5.93)	198.3 (7.81)	215.3 (8.48)	271.8 (10.70)	188.0 (7.40)	119.3 (4.70)	62.8 (2.47)	48.7 (1.92)	69.2 (2.72)	49.8 (1.96)	1,540.9 (60.67)
Average precipitation days (≥ 0.1 mm)	12.7	12.5	16.0	15.8	14.6	15.4	10.8	9.6	6.6	6.9	9.3	9.3	139.5
Average snowy days	3.2	1.9	0.6	0	0	0	0	0	0	0	0.2	1.3	7.2
Average relative humidity (%)	78	77	79	78	78	83	78	77	76	73	75	74	77
Mean monthly sunshine hours	92.9	95.4	113.0	138.8	158.7	145.5	230.9	225.3	193.6	175.2	140.0	129.6	1,838.9
Percentage possible sunshine	29	30	30	36	38	35	54	56	53	50	44	41	41
Source: China Meteorological Administration
