= Ethnic villages of China =

Village-level subdivision designated for minority groups

formally Village level divisions
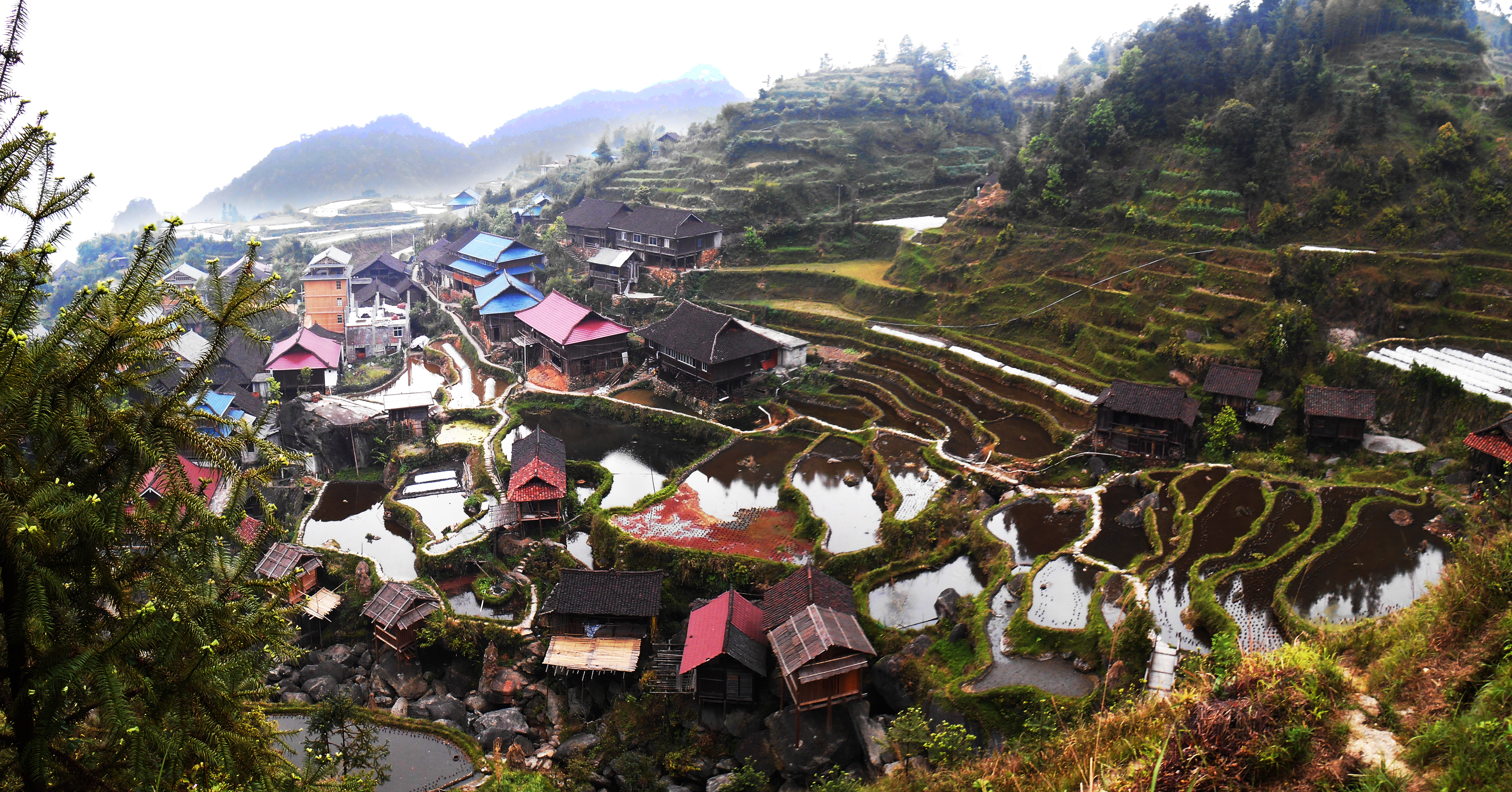
- Rongshui Miao Autonomous County
- Simplified Chinese: 村级行政区
- Traditional Chinese: 村級行政區
Transcriptions
Standard Mandarin
- Hanyu Pinyin: Cūn Jí Xíngzhèngqū

Alternative Chinese name
- Chinese: 村
Transcriptions
Standard Mandarin
- Hanyu Pinyin: Cūn

Ethnic villages are a basic administrative district within China designated for minority ethnic groups. The villages are designated by the government within geographical regions where minority groups live. The approval and establishment of a village is most often the responsibility of provincial governments and prefectural governments, however villages are often established with different requirement standards. According to a local ordinance regarding the protection of interests relating to minority group villages, a meeting is held where 30% of participants belong to a minority group; if the local government approves of the formation of the new establishment, the region is designated an ethnic village. In Hubei province, villages where minorities account for 50% of the population are designated as minority group villages.

The People's Republic of China officially recognises 55 distinct ethnic minorities along with the Han majority. Official recognition of ethnicity, which began in the 1950s, is stated on each citizen's identification card.

In 2005, the Program to Support the Ethnic Minorities with Small Populations (2005–2010) was formulated and implemented, covering 640 different ethnic-minority villages as recipients of assistance.

== Background ==
Since the end of the Great Leap Forward and the implementation of the open-door policy, rapid urbanisation has been a feature of the Chinese economy for four decades. As such, the role of rural ethnic groups is continuously recycled to facilitate economic development. Over the last century, some of these roles have included the cradle of Communist victory, ground zero of China's structural reforms, a source of excess labor, and a source of escapism for urban Chinese.

=== Early history ===
China’s ethnic groups emerged about 3000 years ago, with the Huaxia people being the first. There is fossil evidence of different groups with a wide distribution, for example fossils of the Yuanmou people have been found in the Yunnan province of China from 1.7 million years ago. The Shang dynasty is the first with historical records, the people of the Shang dynasty were originally known as the Yi people. They moved to the East Henan where they succeeded in agriculture and raising animals which boosted the economy. The Zhou dynasty took over from the Shang at around 1122 BCE. The Yue Kingdom existed during the summer, autumn and warring periods after the Zhou dynasty (770-478 BC), people would come from different areas and settle and would become the Yue people. Similarly, with the Chu Kingdom, when migrants arrived, they became the Chu people. The formation of the Han ethnicity came about with the Qin and Han dynasty (206 BCE). People from the central plains were referred to as the Han people (largest ethnic group). Fei states that the origins of the ethnic minorities are due to populations that have been separated a long time and have established their own features and cultures. The fossil evidence does not support the theory that people from other countries and places came to China to form ethnic groups as there is evidence as early as the Neolithic or Stone Age of different groups within China. The evidence supports the plural and indigenous origins theory, that people separated and the different environments gave rise to unique cultures.

=== Distribution ===
The ethnic groups of China are mainly distributed in the southwest, northeast and northwest mountains. The villages of the Manchu and Hui are mainly situated in the north eastern region of China. The Yi, Zhuang and Miao minorities populate the southwest of China. The ethnic groups of Mongolians, Manchu, Uyghur, Tibetan and Hui have large populations in the Northern regions of China.

=== Economy ===
Ethnic minority villages in the North-eastern region of China are known have a healthier economy than other villages. Villages in the southwest of China have a poorer situation than the average village. Manchu villages have a much higher income compared to others, with all Manchu village sin the upper half of the distribution of income and to have a 42% higher mean per capita than the average ethnic village. Uyghur villages are at the bottom of the distribution with an income gap of the 32%. South-western villages have an average income gap of 50% with Yi, Mao and Zhuang villages at the lower end of the distribution.

Factors that contribute to the state of the rural villages economic situations include the level of local labour, industrialisation and agriculture. Distance and location are one of the most important reasons that distinguish villages with poorer income, such as the Hui and Uyghur villages. Out-migration or internal migration is another mechanism for the development of the economy. Villagers temporarily move to urban areas to look for work because there is none in their own village. Households in China commonly save the majority of their income and migrants that move from rural to urban save even more. Which can in turn increase the economy in the migrant’s village of origin, by for example investing in properties.

=== Government relations ===
The obstacles to educating a large rural population have been recognised as one of the largest challenges facing the reform-era Chinese government. In 1986, the Chinese government legislated compulsory elementary and middle school attendance. Yet among rural ethnic villagers, work is seen as a more reliable step towards upward mobility. Discontent with the educational system leads many villagers to opt-out of compulsory schooling. On the national level, the Chinese government balances a guiding principle of unity with the desire for ethnic autonomy. In 1984, the Regional Ethnic Autonomy Law granted local governments authority to regulate local minority culture so long as they do not conflict with national interests. Challenging the limits imposed by the national government, as the Tibetans and Uyghurs have in their demands for self-determination, may lead to conflict with the state.

=== Ethnic tourism ===
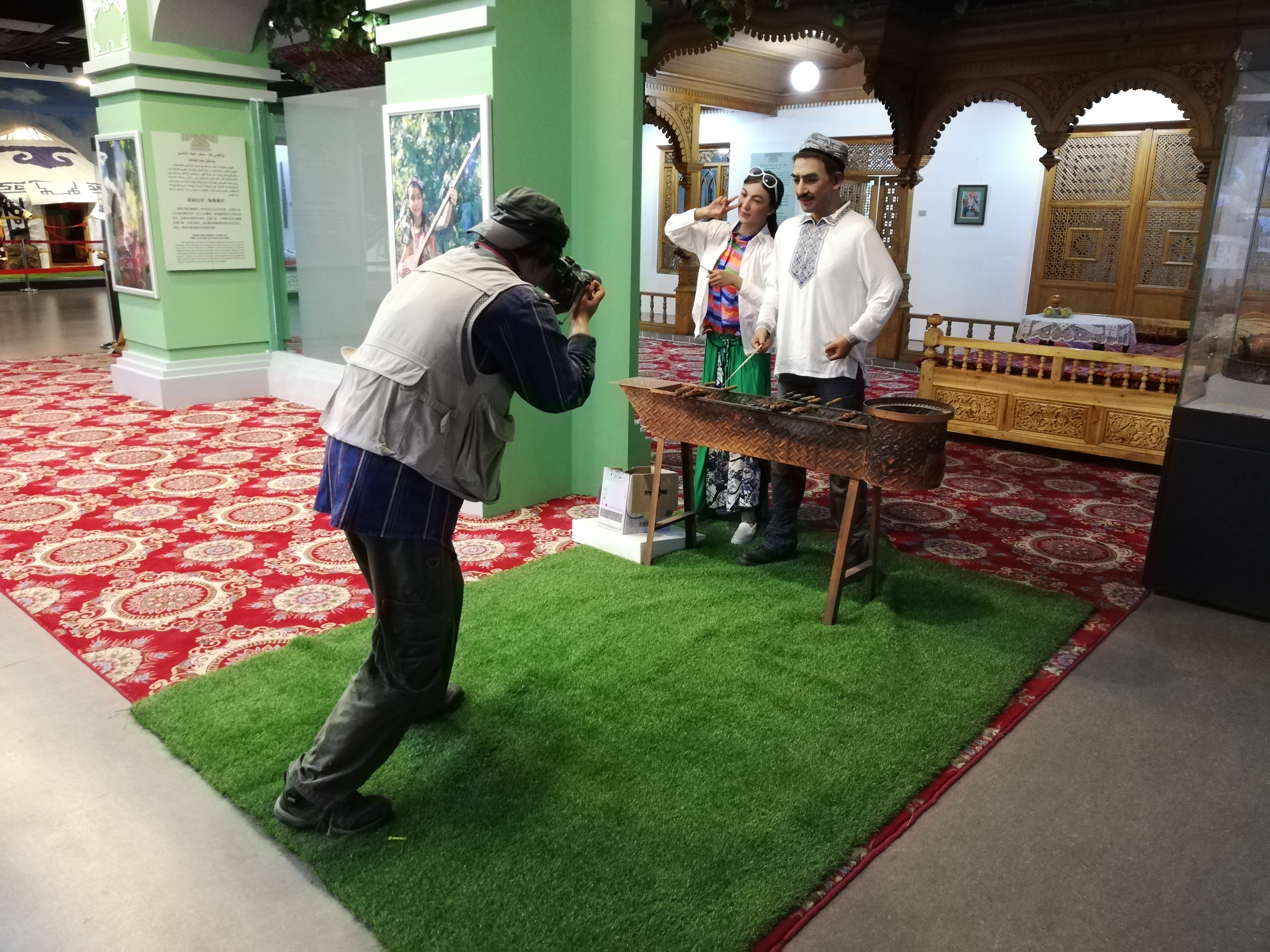
"Ethnic Minorities Exhibit" at the Xinjiang Uyghur Autonomous Region Museum in Ürümqi

Government intervention in development is not limited to education or local autonomy. The Chinese Government is largely responsible for the planning and promotion of tourism. Tourism in rural China's ethnic villages has long been a staple of development; especially important to attracting tourists is an area's natural landscape and cultural heritage. Ethnic tourism blends the ideals of Chinese nationalism with ethnic diversity. As part of the 11th Five Year Plan beginning in 2006, the Chinese Government declared that developing rural tourism would contribute to building a "New Socialist Countryside". Although rural tourism was not a new idea, the national delegation of 2006 as the year of "China Rural Tourism" was a way for the government to appropriate the growing tourism trends in China, and define the contribution of rural China to modernisation. Often, the ethnic and rural traits of villages are played up in order to build better tourism infrastructure and cater to urban views about modernity. Tourism authorities have been encouraged to produce development plans that rely on exotic cultural images based on the stereotypes charming countryside dwellers. These strategies include performing entertaining traditional songs and dances, using colourful images on postcards and trinkets, beautifying local architecture, and using signage to attract drivers from the highway. To enhance a destination's appeal, government may seize control over determining the role of ethnic minorities in marketing and development.

== Table of ethnic groups ==
The following are the 10 largest populations of the 55 (excluding Han group) ethnic minorities of China from a survey in 2002.

Ethnic minority	Population - in millions	Location concentration	Major language	Major religion
1. Zhuang	12.6	Guizhou, Guangdong, Guangxi, Yunnan	Has their own native written language	Have their own religion
2. Miao	7.7	Hainan, Guizhou, Hubei, Sichuan, Hunan, Chongqing, Guangxi, Yunnan	Miao has their own native spoken and written language	Miao Religion
3. Yi	7.0	Sichuan, Yunnan, Guizhou, Guangxi	Have their native written and spoken language	Bimo Religion
4. Manchu	6.9	Beijing, Jilin, Helongjiang, Liaoning, Hebei, Mongolia	Manchu have their native written and spoken language however rarely used	Shamanism
5. Uyghur	6.8	Hunan, Chongqing, Guizhou, Hubei	Uyghur have their native written language	Islam
6. Tujia	6.6	Hunan, Chongqing, Guizhou, Hubei	Tujia have their native spoken language, but currently not in use	Worship their Ancestors
7. Hui	5.4	Ningxia, Xinjiang, Gansu, Qinghai, Hebei, Yunnan, Shandong	-	Islam
8. Tibetan	4.7	Tibet, Yunnan, Sichuan, Qinghai	Tibetans have native written and spoken language	Buddhism
9. Mongolian	3.9	Mongolia, Jilin, Gansu Xinjiang, Qinghai, Henan, Liaoning, Heilongjiang	Mongolians have their native spoken and written language	Buddhism
10. Dong	2.4	Guizhou, Hunan, Guangxi	Dong people have native spoken and written language	Have their own religion

== Overview of ethnic villages ==
=== Miao villages ===
==== Language ====
The Miao people have their own spoken and written language and their own religion.

==== Location ====
The majority of the Miao people are situated in villages in the Guizhou province where farming is their main source of income.

==== Tourism ====
Langde and Nanhua are villages that are located in Guizhou and are known as tourist destinations. The Chinese Government is promoting tourism in this area to assist in increasing the village's revenue. The Miao villages had approximately 47 million tourists in 2006, with 10% of tourists from overseas. Langde has around 4700 annual visitors which accounts for 40-50% of household income. In Langde, 80% of the village’s population anticipated that their culture would become weaker. Nanhua had an increase in revenue due to tourism with US$171 000. Tourist attraction that they have include acrobatic performances, fire eating and walking on glass or hot metal that are not related to the Miao culture. In Nanhua, surveys of the Chinese tourists showed that the majority were not satisfied with the authenticity of their experience.

Another Miao village is the Guoliang village, it is one the largest in the West of Hunan. The government has been giving the village financial support since 2002 to increase tourism. A local tourism company manages and trains villagers on welcoming tourists and performances. The company advertised the “climbing the knife ladder” and “jumping into the sea of fire” as an exclusive Miao performance. Where the rungs of the ladder are knives, and the ritualist climbs barefoot and for the ‘sea of fire’ the ritualist steps on a board of hot iron barefoot. They have become a part of the ‘intangible heritage representative work’, in the ‘acrobatic and aesthetic’ category. The government distributes funds to protect these heritage works.

Basha is made up of five villages called, Zaizhuang, Darongpo Xin, Da, Zaige Xin and Wangjia with a population that is 98.7% Miao. Basha is located in the Don autonomous Prefecture of the Guizhou Province with a total population of 2412 (in 2017). In the early 1990s, improvements to transportation were made and Basha become more known. The Basha are known of their landscape, tree worship, the ‘hugun’ hairstyle, firearms and clothing. The tourism authorities manage tourism in Basha and are how the Basha communicate with the outside world. The tourism authorities have made Basha known as “the last gun-toting tribe in the world”, but what is promoted is different to the traditions. The number of guns owned were low and they were prohibited to carry them by law. The local police station allows the Basha men to carry them only for performances. The Basha stage a performance for the tourists of the unique ‘hugun’ hairstyle, where they use a scythe to shave hair on the back and side. The scythe is only used for tourist performances, the traditional tool is small knife they use for cutting rice sheaves.

=== Dong Village of Zhaoxing ===
==== Language ====
The Dong people have their own spoken and written language.

==== Tourism ====
The development of tourism in Zhaoxing began in 1982, due to a government initiative to develop tourism. In 2003, a tourism company from Guiyang and the government continued to further develop tourism. The local government signed a 50-year contract with a tourism investment company to further develop tourism. The town appeared in The National Geographic magazine as one of the “Most Attractive Places in 2007”. Candice states how this has led the many variations of Dong cultures to be grouped into one group. Villagers that had been interviewed explained how they felt they weren’t in control the development of their village. They also expressed how they were unhappy with the tourism companies being present in their village. This government initiative has led to the monthly income of the villagers to increase and is higher than other surrounding Dong areas. With the number of tourists increasing twofold from 28 000 in 2 years. The majority of the villagers earn above 10 000 RMB (Ren Min Bi) annually whereas the Rongjiang County in the Dong area where the mean income was under 1000 RMB. This increase in income has caused inflation, resulting in an increase of everyday expenses.

=== Mosuo Luoshiu village ===
==== Location ====
The Luoshui village is located in Ninglang County in the Yunnan Province and on the shore of the Lugu Lake.

==== Population ====
The main ethnic population of this area is the Mosuo people, comprising 50% of lakeside villages.

==== Tourism ====
Tourism began when the Lugu Lake became a natural protection area in the late 1980s. The improvements of roads and accommodations have grown tourism from the 1990s, where Luoshui is the most visited among the lakeside villages. The mean annual income increased from 196 RMB in 1988 to 50 000 RMB in 2005, with tourism as their main source. The villagers of Luoshui support tourism by selling souvenirs, opening restaurants and accommodations. They also participate in activities for the tourists such as dance shows and horse riding.

=== Manjinglan Dai village ===
==== Location ====
The Dai village of Manjinglan is situated in Yunnan, China.

==== Population ====
The Dai are the largest ethnic group with a population of 13 979 in 2000.

==== Income ====
Their main source of income was rubber and rice up until the 1990s. There was the introduction of the Household Responsibility System that allowed families to control their own land and income in the 1970s to 1980s.

==== Tourism ====
In the mid 1990s, Manjinglan’s economy increased as Jinghong a larger city 2 kilometres away had a boom in tourism. The villagers sold their land to the local government so more hotels could be built and for general development. Many of the households divided areas under their stilted homes where they would normally keep livestock, so they could lease them out to migrants workers that came to work due to the Tourism boom. As of 1995, there were over 4000 workers that lived under the stilted homes. This rental revenue become the majority of household income, where some houses had 80% of their income coming from the rentals. The main street of the village is now home to hostels and hotels. The village previously used by a separate village but after urbanisation has become a suburb of Jinghong.

== In popular culture ==
=== Yunnan Ethnic Village ===
The Yunnan Nationalities Village, colloquially Yunnan Ethnic Village, (Chinese: 云南民族村; pinyin: Yúnnán Mínzú Cūn) is a theme park that displays the various folklore, culture, and religion of 26 ethnic groups in Yunnan Province, China next to Dianchi lake. The park covers an area of 89 hectares including 31 hectares of water.

=== Binglang Ethnic Village ===
The Binglang ethnic village or Binglanggu is an ethnic theme park that showcases the culture of the Miao and Li ethnic groups. The theme park was established in 1995 and is located in the Baoting Li and Miao Anonymous County where many Li villages are situated. The theme park has an area of 333 hectares. This village was created to give people the chance to learn more about Miao and Yi culture. There are exhibitions that show traditions such as clothing, pottery and musical instruments made of bamboo. The Li people play traditional music for the tourists, and the Li and Miao have dance performances.

=== Huangdu Dong Ethnic Cultural Village ===
The Huangdo Dong Ethnic Village is owned by the Tongdao Dong Autonomous County. There is a hotel, tourist service centre and buses for transport. The village showcases Dong traditional architecture such as stilted buildings made of wood, drum towers, wells and “lounge bridges” which are used for transportation but also have a recreational area such as a gallery. The village also presents other Dong cultural elements, including Gallaox a type of folk song, Opera and Duoye the Dong ethnic dance. The Dong people also have a “Long Table Banquet” which can be experienced by tourists, is it when hundreds of people are invited to the village to eat together and then sing and dance.

== List ==
- Gaodang Buyi Village
- Langde Miao Village
- Manjinglan Dai Village
- Mosou Luishiu Village
- Nanhua Miao Village
- Rucheng County
- Rongshui County
- Xijiang Town
- Zhaoxing Dong Village

== See also ==
- Villages of China
- Urban village (China)
- Organic Law of Village Committees
- Residential community § China
