= Chun'an County =

Chun'an 淳安县 Shunan
- County
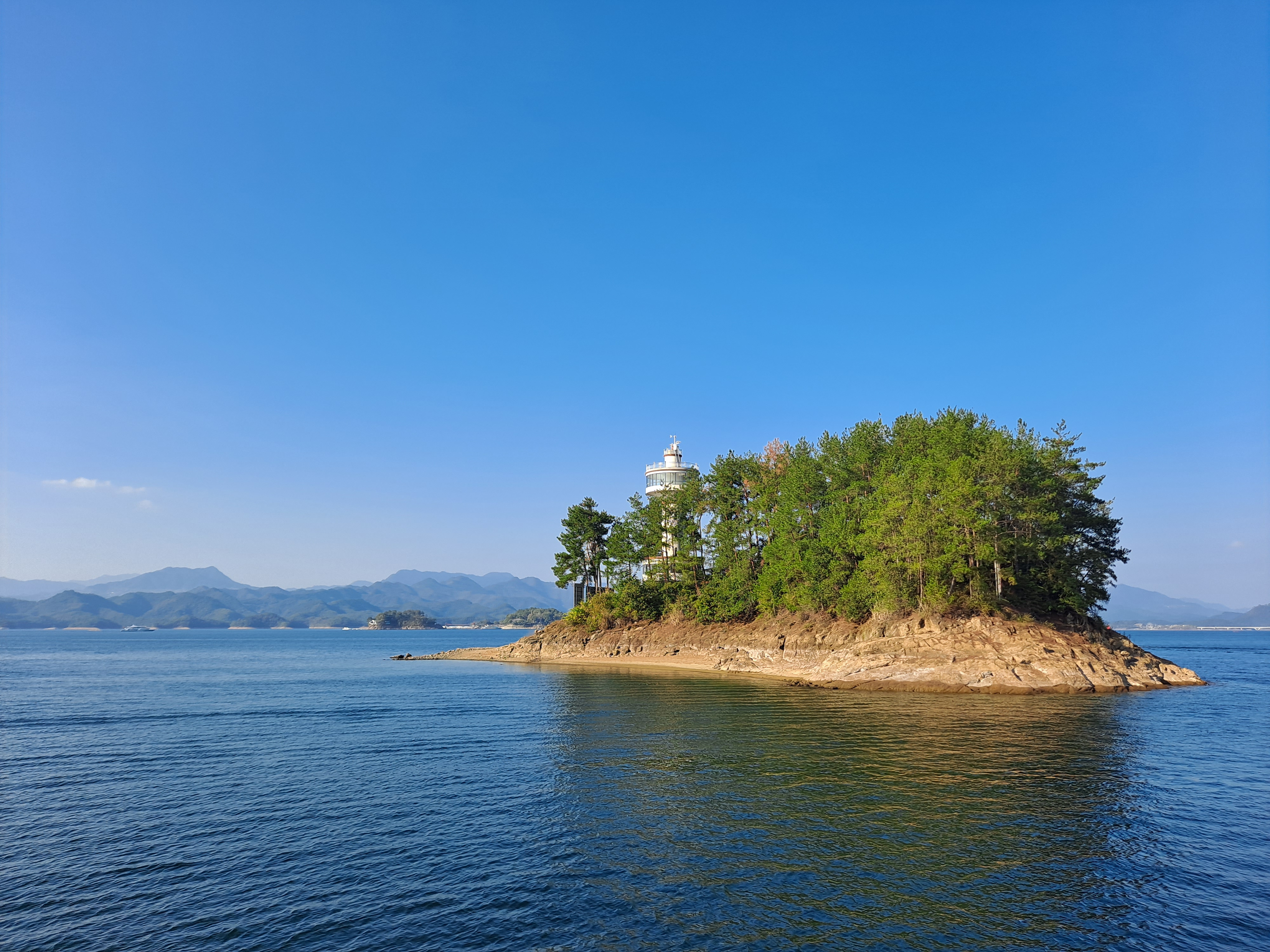
- Qiandao Lake, which makes up one-third of the total land area of the county

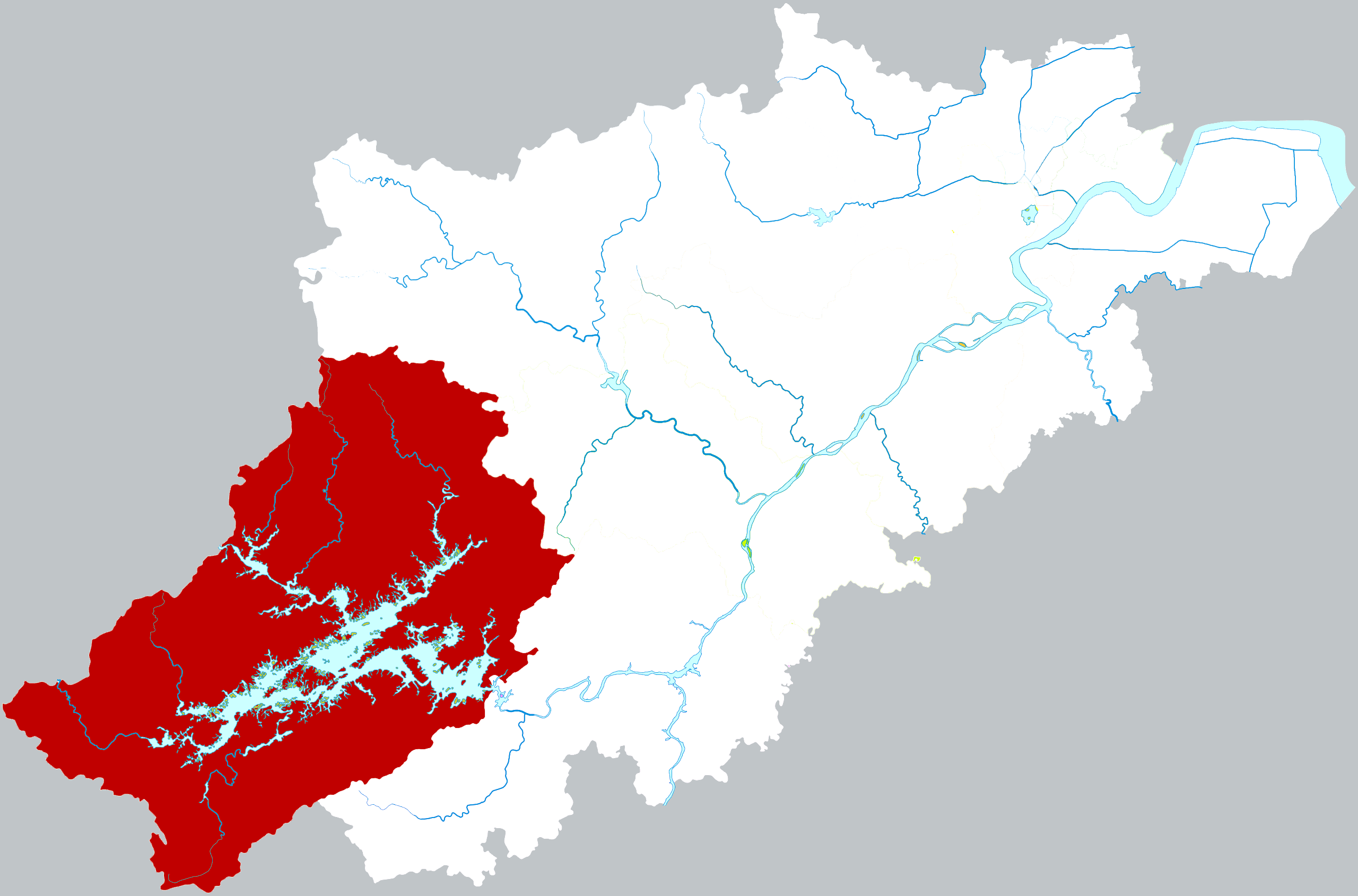
- Location of Chun'an County within Hangzhou

- Location of the seat in Zhejiang
- Coordinates: 29°36′10″N 119°02′20″E
- Country: People's Republic of China
- Province: Zhejiang
- Sub-provincial city: Hangzhou

Area
  - Total: 4,417.48 km^{2} (1,705.60 sq mi)
- Time zone: UTC+8 (China Standard)
- Postal code: 311700

Chun'an (simplified Chinese: 淳安县; traditional Chinese: 淳安縣; pinyin: Chún'ān Xiàn) is a county of Zhejiang Province, East China, under the administration of the prefecture-level city of Hangzhou, the capital of Zhejiang, containing the well-known Qiandao Lake and bordering Anhui province to the northwest. It has a land area of 4,452 km^{2} (1,719 sq mi) and a population of 450,000. The postal code is 311700, and the county seat is located on 18 North Xin'an Rd., Qiandaohu Town.

== Administrative divisions ==
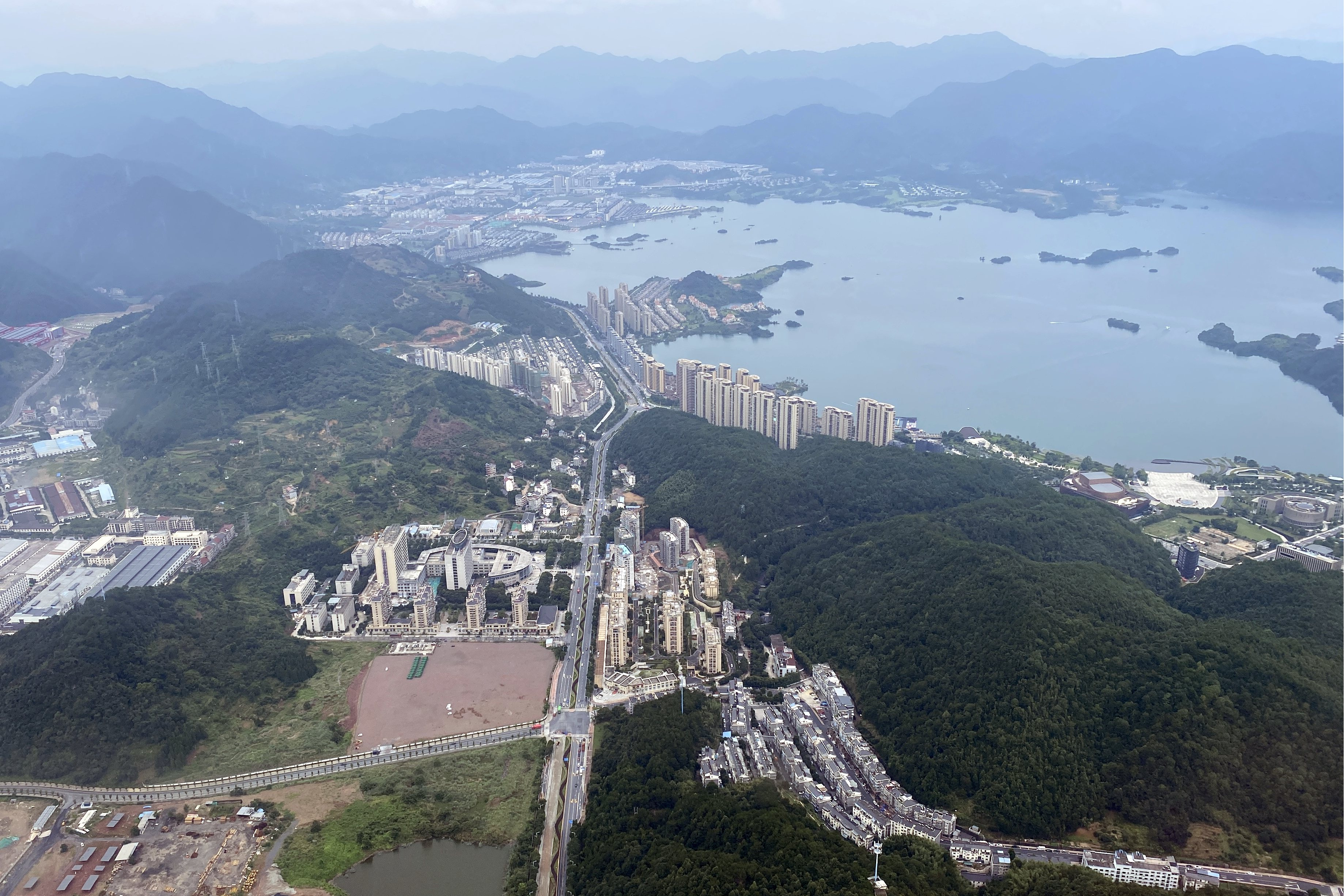
Aerial view of Chun'an and Qiandao Lake

Chun'an consists of 12 towns, 18 townships, eight districts, five resident districts and 889 administrative villages.

- Towns: Qiandaohu, Linqi, Weiping, Jiangjia, Fenkou, Shilin, Dashu, Tangcun, Zitong, Zhongzhou, Wenchang, Fengshuling.
- Townships: Lishang, Pingmen, Langchuan, Anyang, Wangbu, Guocun, Jinfeng, Yaoshan, Guangchang, Songcun, Jiuken, Yanjia, Baima, Zuokou, Wangzhai, Fuwen, Hengyan and Jieshou.

== Climate ==
Climate data for Chun'an, elevation 171 m (561 ft), (1991–2020 normals, extremes 1981–2010)
Month	Jan	Feb	Mar	Apr	May	Jun	Jul	Aug	Sep	Oct	Nov	Dec	Year
Record high °C (°F)	21.9 (71.4)	26.4 (79.5)	32.4 (90.3)	34.0 (93.2)	35.9 (96.6)	36.4 (97.5)	40.7 (105.3)	40.5 (104.9)	39.8 (103.6)	36.9 (98.4)	29.6 (85.3)	22.2 (72.0)	40.7 (105.3)
Mean daily maximum °C (°F)	9.4 (48.9)	11.8 (53.2)	16.0 (60.8)	22.2 (72.0)	26.9 (80.4)	29.0 (84.2)	33.5 (92.3)	33.5 (92.3)	29.3 (84.7)	24.1 (75.4)	18.1 (64.6)	12.0 (53.6)	22.2 (71.9)
Daily mean °C (°F)	5.6 (42.1)	7.4 (45.3)	11.2 (52.2)	16.8 (62.2)	21.8 (71.2)	24.7 (76.5)	28.7 (83.7)	28.6 (83.5)	24.7 (76.5)	19.5 (67.1)	13.7 (56.7)	8.0 (46.4)	17.6 (63.6)
Mean daily minimum °C (°F)	3.0 (37.4)	4.4 (39.9)	7.8 (46.0)	13.0 (55.4)	18.2 (64.8)	21.8 (71.2)	25.3 (77.5)	25.2 (77.4)	21.4 (70.5)	16.1 (61.0)	10.6 (51.1)	5.0 (41.0)	14.3 (57.8)
Record low °C (°F)	−5.8 (21.6)	−5.7 (21.7)	−2.3 (27.9)	2.6 (36.7)	8.3 (46.9)	13.6 (56.5)	18.3 (64.9)	18.5 (65.3)	12.8 (55.0)	4.4 (39.9)	−0.9 (30.4)	−6.7 (19.9)	−6.7 (19.9)
Average precipitation mm (inches)	88.0 (3.46)	99.9 (3.93)	162.4 (6.39)	178.3 (7.02)	189.5 (7.46)	332.5 (13.09)	164.4 (6.47)	111.1 (4.37)	82.0 (3.23)	52.7 (2.07)	77.5 (3.05)	59.9 (2.36)	1,598.2 (62.9)
Average precipitation days (≥ 0.1 mm)	13.4	12.8	16.2	15.6	15.4	16.7	11.2	12.3	9.5	7.3	9.8	10.5	150.7
Average snowy days	4.0	2.7	0.9	0	0	0	0	0	0	0	0.1	1.5	9.2
Average relative humidity (%)	75	75	76	76	76	82	77	75	74	71	74	72	75
Mean monthly sunshine hours	103.6	101.5	121.3	143.7	164.7	135.6	224.7	216.4	173.2	169.1	134.2	127.8	1,815.8
Percentage possible sunshine	32	32	33	37	39	32	53	53	47	48	42	40	41
Source: China Meteorological Administration

== See also ==
- Qiandao Lake
- Hangzhou Qiandaohu
