= Zhongguan, Jiangxi =

Town in Jiangxi province

Zhongguan 中馆镇
- Town
- Location in Jiangxi Zhongguan (China)
- Coordinates: 29°22′48″N 116°32′23″E
- Country: People's Republic of China
- Province: Jiangxi
- Prefecture-level city: Jiujiang
- County: Duchang County

Area
  - Total: 50.7 km^{2} (19.6 sq mi)
- Elevation: 22 m (72 ft)

Population
  - Total: 19,000
  - Density: 370/km^{2} (970/sq mi)
- Time zone: UTC+8 (China Standard)
- Area code: 0792

Zhongguan (simplified Chinese: 中馆; traditional Chinese: 中館; pinyin: Zhōngguǎn) is a town in the east of Duchang County in northern Jiangxi province, China, located 55 km (34 mi) from the county seat and just south of G56 Hangzhou–Ruili Expressway. As of 2018, it has 1 residential community (社区) and 8 villages under its administration. It has a population of 19,000 residing in an area of 50.7 km^{2} (19.6 sq mi).

== See also ==
- List of township-level divisions of Jiangxi
