= Suonan =

Suonan 锁南镇
- Town
- Interactive map of Suonan
- Coordinates: 35°39′48″N 103°23′24″E
- Country: China
- Province: Gansu
- Prefecture: Linxia Hui
- County: Dongxiang

Area
  - Total: 49 km^{2} (19 sq mi)

Population (2008)
  - Total: 23,360

Suonan is a town, and the county seat of, Dongxiang Autonomous County, Linxia Hui Autonomous Prefecture, Gansu, China.

It was named after Tibetan Empire consul Sunanpu (Chinese: 锁南普), who lived here. Since 1950, it has been the seat of the county government.

The economy is mainly involved around agriculture, producing wheat, potatoes and beans. The town also has factories for agricultural machinery and carpets.

== See also ==
- List of township-level divisions of Gansu
