= Dashu, Zhejiang =

Dashu 大墅镇
- Town
- Location in Zhejiang
- Coordinates: 29°24′25″N 118°44′10″E
- Country: People's Republic of China
- Province: Zhejiang
- Prefecture-level city: Hangzhou
- County: Chun'an County
- Time zone: UTC+8 (China Standard)

Dashu (Chinese: 大墅; pinyin: Dàshù) is a town under the administration of Chun'an County, Zhejiang, China. As of 2018, it has 17 villages under its administration.
