= Dashu, Hanyuan County =

Dashu 大树镇
- Town
- Location in Sichuan
- Coordinates: 29°18′9″N 102°39′40″E
- Country: People's Republic of China
- Province: Sichuan
- Prefecture-level city: Ya'an
- County: Hanyuan County
- Time zone: UTC+8 (China Standard)

Dashu (simplified Chinese: 大树; traditional Chinese: 大樹; pinyin: Dàshù) is a town under the administration of Hanyuan County, Sichuan, China. As of 2018, it had three residential communities and five villages under its administration.
