= Kam people =

Ethnic group of Southeast Asia

Kam Dong
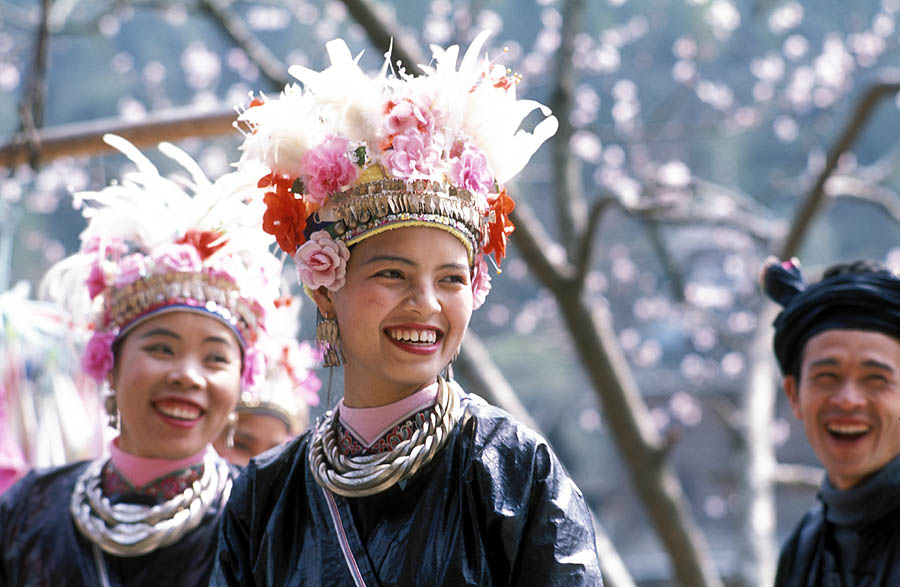
- Ethnic Kam women and man in holiday dresses. Liping County, Guizhou, China.

Total population
- 3,500,000

Regions with significant populations
- Guizhou, Hunan and Guangxi provinces, China; small pockets in Vietnam and Laos

Languages
- Kam, Chinese

Religion
- Polytheism, Buddhism, Christianity

The Kam people (Kam: Gaeml, [kɐ́m]), officially known in China as Dong people (Chinese: 侗族; pinyin: Dòngzú), are a Kam–Sui people and one of the 56 ethnic groups officially recognized by the People's Republic of China. They live mostly in eastern Guizhou, western Hunan and northern Guangxi. Small pockets of Kam speakers are found in Tuyên Quang Province in Vietnam.

They are famed for their native-bred Kam Sweet Rice (Chinese: 香禾糯), carpentry skills and unique architecture, in particular a form of covered bridge known as the "wind and rain bridge" (Chinese: 风雨桥). The Kam people call themselves Kam, Geml, Jeml or Gaeml.

== History ==
The Kam are thought to be the modern-day descendants of the ancient Rau peoples who occupied much of southern China. Kam legends generally maintain that the ancestors of the Kam migrated from the east. According to the migration legends of the Southern Kam people, their ancestors came from Guangzhou, Guangdong and Wuzhou, Guangxi. The Northern Kam maintain that their ancestors fled Zhejiang and Fujian because of locust swarms. Some scholars (mainly Chinese) also believe that the Kam were a branch of the Bai Yue from the first century CE. The Bai Yue inhabited the Yangze River basin after the collapse of the Yue Kingdom around the first century CE which led to the establishment of many small chiefdoms.

The first explicit mention of the Kam (or Dong) people come from Ming dynasty sources. Many Kam rebellions took place during the Ming and Qing dynasties, but none were successful in the long run. The Qing developed extensive irrigation systems in the area and rice harvests increased significantly but this mostly benefited the local landlords. The Kam were further exploited after the first Opium War of 1840–1842 by Western forces, capitalists, landlords, usurers and Qing officials.

As a consequence of these events, many Kam helped or joined the Chinese Communists soon after its founding in 1921. They supplied food and resources to the Red Army as it passed through Guangxi during the Long March. Some Kam also allied with the People's Liberation Army through establishing guerilla units against the forces of Chiang Kai-Shek. After 1949, infrastructure was quickly developed in Kam areas. Schools, roads, small factories and more were built. Many Kam also became government officials.

Although the Kam and Han Chinese peoples generally get along well today, the history of Guizhou is marked by innumerable tensions and conflicts between the Han Chinese and non-Han minority groups. Today, many Kam are assimilating into mainstream Chinese society as rural Kam move into urban areas, resulting in intermarriage with the Han Chinese and the loss of the Kam language. However, various attempts to preserve Kam culture and language have been very successful, and improving living conditions in rural Guizhou may entice local Kam villagers to stay rather than move to major urban areas.

== Language ==
The Kam language (autonym: lix Gaeml) is a Tai–Kadai (Chinese: Zhuang–Dong) language. Ethnologue distinguishes three Kam varieties as separate but closely related languages: Northern Dong [doc], Southern Dong [kmc], and Cao Miao [cov]. Sui, Maonan and Mulao are the languages most closely related to Kam. Historically, Northern Kam has been influenced by Chinese much more than has Southern Kam.

The Kam language has no traditional script of its own. The Kam people sometimes use Chinese characters to represent the sounds of Kam words. A Latin alphabet was developed in 1958, but it is not much in use due to a lack of printed material and trained teachers.

== Distribution ==
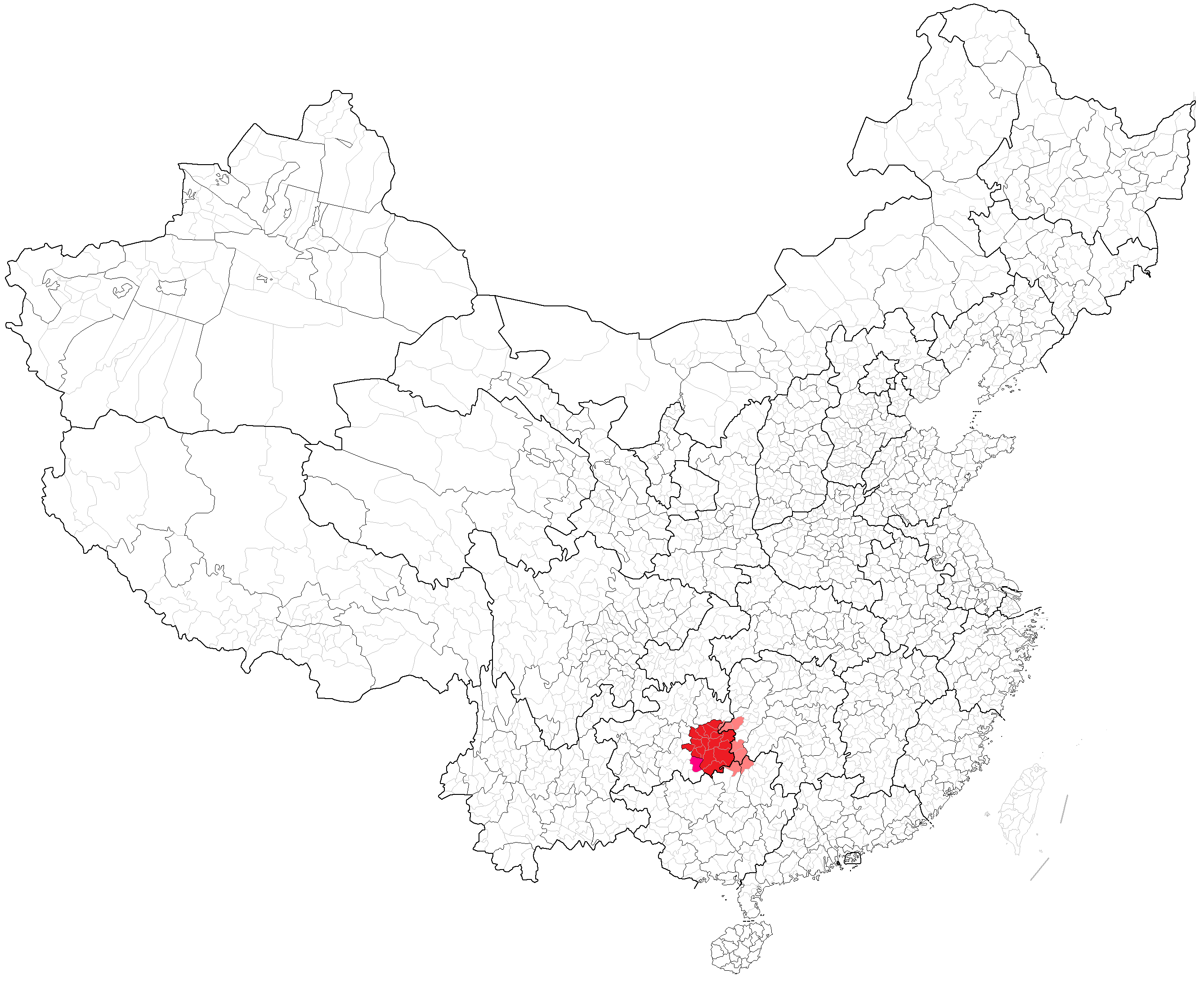
Kam-Dong (red) and Sui (purple) autonomous prefectures and counties

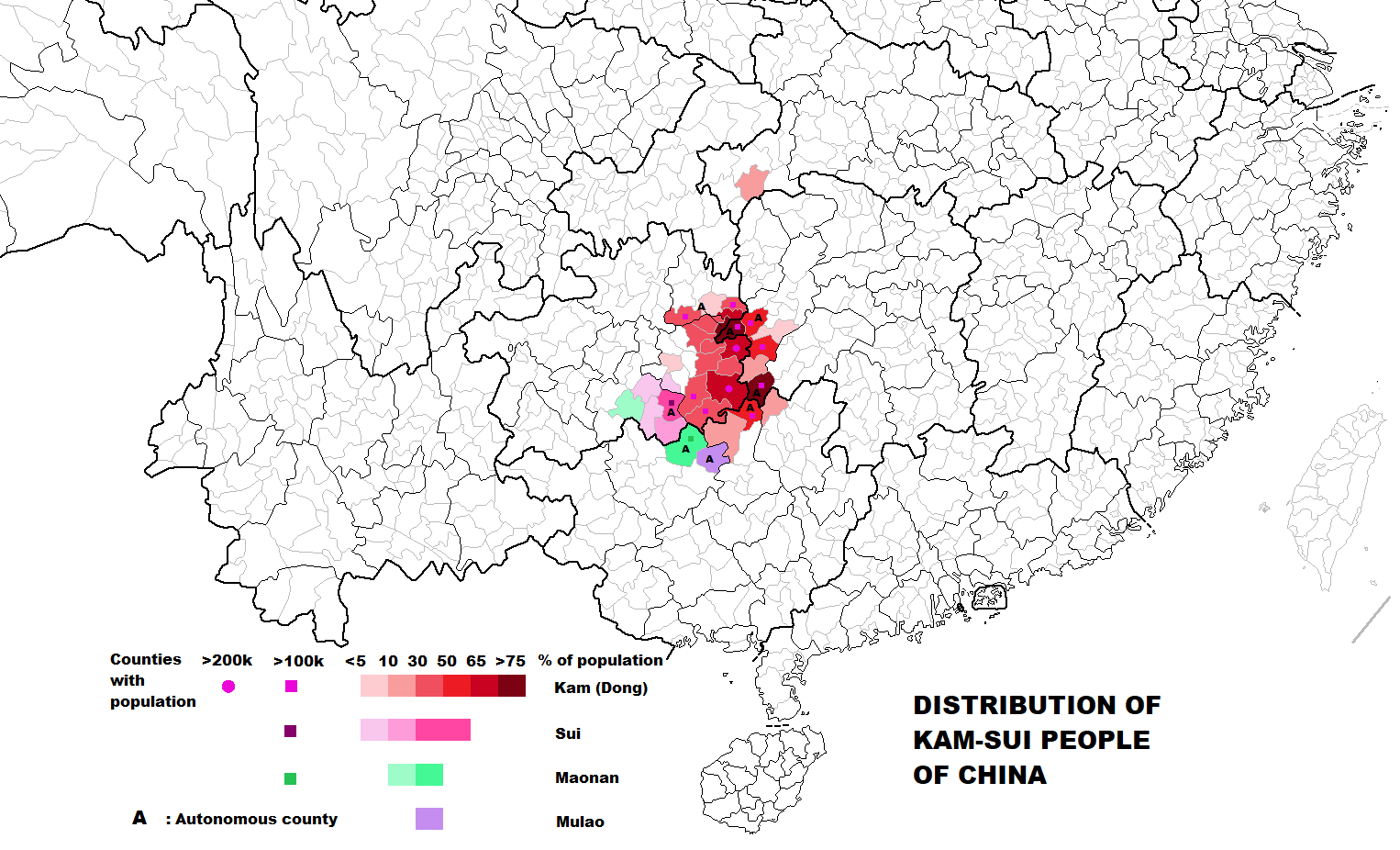
Distribution of the Dong and other Kam-Sui ethnic groups in China

The Census of 2020 recorded 3,495,993 Kam in China.

Provincial Distribution of the Kam, from the 2020 census

Province-level division	Kam Population	% of China's Kam Population
Guizhou Province	1,650,871	47.23%
Hunan Province	865,518	24.76%
Guangxi Zhuang Autonomous Region	362,580	10.37%
Guangdong Province	241,790	6.92%
Zhejiang Province	146,773	4.20%
Fujian Province	31,784	0.91%
Jiangsu Province	24,413	0.70%
Shanghai Municipality	11,870	0.34%
Other	160,394	4.59%

County-level distribution of the Kam

(Only includes counties or county-equivalents containing >1% of county population.)

Province	Prefecture/city	County	% Kam	Kam population	Total population
Guizhou province	(whole province)		4.62	1,628,568	35,247,695
Guizhou	Tongren prefecture	(whole prefecture)	11.41	376,862	3,302,625
Guizhou	Tongren prefecture	Tongren City (Bijiang District)	33.72	104,051	308,583
Guizhou	Tongren prefecture	Jiangkou County	8.99	17,011	189,288
Guizhou	Tongren prefecture	Yuping Dong Autonomous County	78.09	98,757	126,462
Guizhou	Tongren prefecture	Shiqian County	30.49	101,990	334,508
Guizhou	Tongren prefecture	Songtao Miao Autonomous County	2.56	14,025	547,488
Guizhou	Tongren prefecture	Wanshan District	73.40	40,130	54,674
Guizhou	Qiandongnan Miao Dong autonomous prefecture		31.40	1,207,197	3,844,697
		Kaili city	5.10	22,099	433,236
		Shibing county	2.53	3,464	137,171
		Sansui county	48.89	83193	170,167
		Zhenyuan county	32.23	71,800	222,766
		Cengong county	32.50	61,006	187,734
		Tianzhu county	67.54	235,241	348,302
		Jinping county	49.64	94,537	190,429
		Jianhe county	34.47	65,170	189,085
		Liping county	70.85	324,867	458,533
		Rongjiang county	38.38	115,295	300,369
		Congjiang county	40.88	123,270	301,513
		Leishan county	2.08	2,752	132,004
		Danzhai county	1.07	1,452	135,400
Guangxi			0.69	303,139	43,854,538
	Guilin city		1.04	48,166	4,614,670
		Longshenggezu autonomous county	26.57	42,718	160,796
	Liuzhou prefecture		6.51	229,162	3,522,322
		Rong'an county	2.93	8,303	283,029
		Sanjiang Dong autonomous county	55.98	170,248	304,149
		Rongshui Miao autonomous county	11.28	48,020	425,608
Hubei province			0.12	69,947	59,508,870
	Enshi Tujia Miao autonomous prefecture		1.79	67,440	3,775,190
		Enshi city	2.27	17,187	755,725
		Xuan'en county	13.93	46,817	335,984
Hunan province			1.33	842,123	63,274,173
		Suining county	4.12	13,973	339,235
		Xinning county	0.05	283	557,120
		Chengbu Miao autonomous county	1.45	3,498	241,517
	Huaihua city		17.42	808,155	4,639,738
		Hecheng district	2.99	10,370	346,522
		Huitong county	52.49	173,947	331,392
		Xinhuang Dong autonomous county	80.13	193,678	241,690
		Zhijiang Dong autonomous county	52.37	175,030	334,229
		Jingzhou Miao Dong autonomous county	26.06	63,962	245,444
		Tongdao Dong autonomous county	75.96	156,719	206,327
		Hongjiang city	5.43	26,360	485,061

== Culture ==
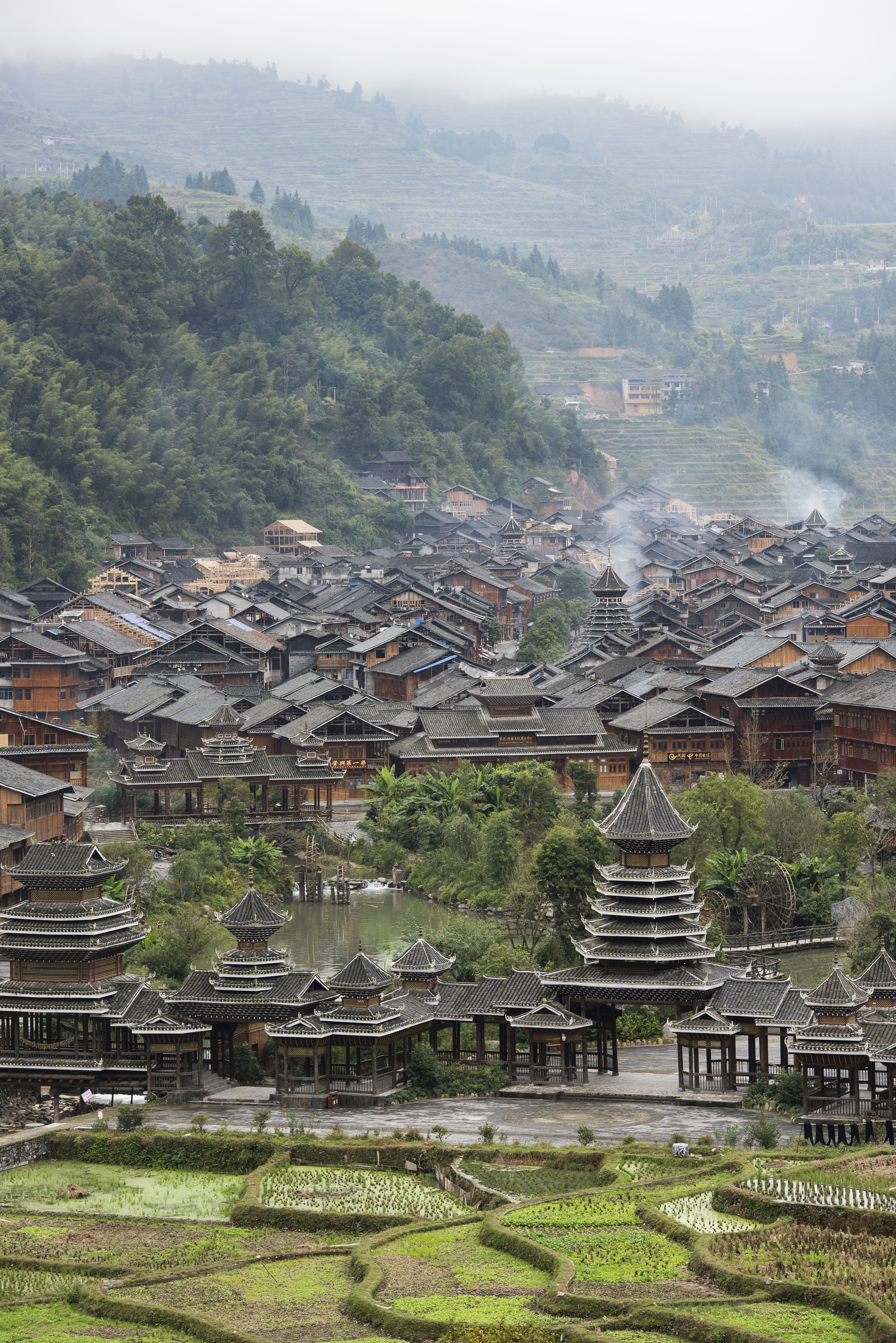
Zhaoxing, the largest Dong village in China

The Kam people are internationally renowned for their polyphonic choir singing, called Kgal Laox in the Kam language (Chinese: 侗族大歌), which can be literally translated as Kam Grand Choir or Grand song in English. The Kam Grand Choir has been listed by UNESCO as a world-class intangible cultural heritage since 2009. Kam choral songs include nature songs, narratives, and children's songs.

One-part songs (as opposed to polyphonic, or many-part, songs) can be sung by one or many people. They include:

- Duo Ye songs
- Love songs – accompanied by the pipa or niutuiqin
- Drinking songs
- Bride's songs
- Mourning songs
- Pipa songs

Operas are highly popular among the Kam and are performed by local troupes. Two famous Kam playwrights are Wu Wencai (1798–1845), author of Mei Liangyu, and Zhang Honggan (1779–1839).

Kam oral literature contains a rich array of legends and folk tales. Many of these popular tales are about the leaders of past uprisings (Geary 2003:218). Celebrated leaders include:

- Xing Ni – An ancient figure, whose legend dates possibly from the Tang dynasty (618–907).
- Wu Mian – Leader of a 1378 rebellion during the Ming dynasty due to drought and famine.
- Lin Kuan – Led a 1397 rebellion but was later executed. Popular among the Northern Kam and is commemorated by an ancient tree.
- Wu Jinyin – Wu revolted in the 1740 to resist grain taxes, but was killed in 1741.

Popular folk tales are listed below. They can be found in The Kam People of China by D. Norman Geary.

- The two orphan brothers
- The unfriendly eldest brother
- Ding Lang and the dragon princess
- Zhu Lang and Niang Mei
- Shan Lang and E Mei
- Liang Shanbo and Zhu Yingtai
- Suo Lao
- Mei Dao
- The frog and the swallow (rice agriculture tale)
- The dog (rice agriculture tale)
- The singing tree (origin of singing tale)
- Liang Niangni (origin of singing tale)
- Lou Niang (drum tower tale)

Traditional medicine is still practiced among the Kam people, including practices such as acupuncture, therapeutic massage, acupressure, bloodletting, application of healing plants, and customs unique to the culture. As in other aspects of Kam life, songs relating to medicine are sung when gathering plants. Plants in the Asteraceae, Fabaceae, Rosaceae, Rubiaceae, Poaceae, Liliaceae, Lamiaceae, Rutaceae, Polygonaceae and Apiaceae families are commonly used in Kam medicine. Traditionally, Kam healers serve as veterinarians as well.

== Society ==
Kam clans are known as dou and are further divided into ji, gong, and households (known as "kitchens"), respectively from largest to smallest in size. Village elders were traditionally the village leaders, although the government replaced these elders with village heads from 1911 to 1949. Kam society was also traditionally matriarchal, as can be evidenced by the cult of the goddess Sa Sui (Geary 2003:88). Before the advent of the Han Chinese, the Kam had no surnames, instead distinguishing each other by their fathers' names.

Kam common law is known as kuan and is practiced at four levels.

1. Single village
2. Several villages
3. Single township / entire local rural area
4. Multiple townships / large portion of the Kam population

=== Courtship and marriage ===
Traditional courtship consists of three phases:

1. Early meeting phase where men and women sing songs and recite poems to one another.
2. Deepening love phase where the courtship is one-to-one and the songs are more spontaneous.
3. Exchanging a token phase where a man gives a woman a gift, with the woman expected to make excuses to test her suitor. The token is usually a minor gift without much monetary value. However, it is highly important symbolically, as it is the equivalent of an engagement ring in Western cultures.

Weddings last three days and are first held at the bride's family's home. The bride is later sent to the groom's home, where an afternoon reception and all-night feast then ensue. The next day there is a "blocking the horse" ceremony where the hosts block the guests while singing songs. The bride typically resides at her parents' house for a few months or even years. Silver jewellery is passed onto the bride by her mother.

=== Birth ===
The birth of a child is complemented by the following events:

1. The "stepping-over-the-threshold person," the first person to enter the home where the child was born, will influence the child's future personality and success.
2. Several fir trees are planted at the birth which are gifted at age 18 for marriage and new home.
3. Neighbors are invited and bring food and gifts.
4. Announcing the birth to the mother's family.
5. Visit from the female relatives on the third day or so; gifts are brought.
6. Homage expressed to the land god for the birth of a male child (practiced by the Northern Kam).
7. Building a "bridge" – Three wooden planks are lined up side by side to express goodwill to passing people.
8. Wrapping the hands – The child's hands are wrapped to help prevent him or her from stealing things later on in life.
9. First haircut at the age of one month.
10. First eating of fermented rice at the age of about one month.
11. First eating of meat dipped in wine at six months old – considered a major milestone.

=== Funerals ===
Like those of the Miao people, Kam funerals are highly elaborate. People who died from unnatural causes (e.g., accidents) are cremated, while those who died from natural causes are buried. Burial consists of the following phases:

1. Receiving the breath – listening for last words and the person's the last breath.
2. Drinking clear tea – Three spoonfuls of "clear tea" and a small pieces of silver are placed into the recently deceased person's mouth.
3. Buying water for washing the corpse.
4. "Washing" the corpse – The corpse is covered with wet money paper.
5. Putting on the graveclothes – Old clothes are taken off.
6. Arranging the "dream bed" – The suona is played during the vigil.
7. Starting on the road – A red cock is killed, and the corpse is removed from the dream bed and placed into a coffin. White headcloths are worn by the mourners (also practiced by the Han Chinese).
8. Digging the "well" (grave).
9. Holding the memorial ceremony – Presents are distributed.
10. Going up the mountain – Coffins are usually placed high up on a mountainside.
11. Placing the coffin into the "well" – A chicken is killed and prayers are said. The chicken is then lowered into the grave and pulled back out again for later consumption.
12. Holding the funeral receptions – Lunch and dinner are held.
13. Returning to the mountain – The sons return to the grave to build a grave-mound. The dead person is called to "go back home" to live at the altar to the family's ancestors.
14. "Transferring the sons" (if the dead is female) – This is a ceremony in which the duties of filial piety are transferred from the deceased mother to her eldest brother or the eldest brother's representative.

== Environment ==
An average-size Kam village has 200–300 homes, although the smallest ones have only 10–20 and the largest ones have more than 1,000. Kam villages typically have:

- Ganlan-style wooden houses (stilt houses)
- Ancient and sacred trees
- Covered ("wind-and-rain") bridges
- Wayside pavilions with wooden or stone benches
- Bullfighting arenas, which are fields
- Wells surrounded by stone rims and usually dug near trees
- Fish-ponds, traditionally communally owned
- Racks for drying grain and granaries
- Village entrances – to protect against intruders, and also are where "blocking the way" ceremonies are held
- Drum towers – usually found only in southern Kam areas today. Drum towers may be village towers or extended-family towers (Geary 2003:47).
- Altars to Sa Sui, the main deity of the Kam pantheon

Popular scenic spots in Kam-speaking territories are the Jiudong region, Liudong region, Chengyang village, Pingdeng region, and Yuping region.

== Agriculture and economy ==
The Kam people cultivate dozens of varieties of glutinous rice (known locally as "Kam" or "good" rice). The Han Chinese cultivate non-glutinous rice, which is called "Han (Chinese) rice" by the Kam. Supplementary foods inclusive maize, millet, vegetables, plums, peaches, pears, mushrooms, mandarin oranges, pomelos, and watermelons. Cotton is cultivated for textile production. Generally the Kam occupy lower-lying land than the Miao and are thus wealthier.

Animals frequently raised by the Kam people include:

- Water buffalo: 1–3 per household
- Pigs: 1–3 per household
- Chickens: 2–20 per household. Hens raised by the Kam generally lay around 100 eggs per year.
- Ducks: 2–4 per household (about half of all households). Ducks tend to destroy rice seedlings and are thus less preferable than chickens.
- Geese: 2–4 per household (about one-tenth of all households). They are recent introductions from the Han Chinese.
- Fish: raised in fish-ponds and sometimes hunted

The "four pillars" of Kam cuisine are glutinous rice, sour (pickled) food, hot pepper, and rice wine. Other popular local dishes and condiments include barbecued fish, intestines sauce, purple blood pork, chicken-blood sauce, oil tea, gongguo (glutinous rice snack sweetened with liana) and bianmi (another glutinous rice snack). The giant salamander is a rare local specialty. Two hot meals (breakfast and dinner) and one cold meal (lunch) are served every day.

The Kam-speaking area is famous for its fir wood. Fir from the Kam area was used to build the ships of 15th-century explorer Zheng He and the Great Hall of the People. Major economic activities include carpentry and the manufacture of silverwork and wickerwork. Baskets and other wickerwork are usually made by men. Baskets can be made from five types of plant materials, namely glutinous rice straw, cogongrass, Guangxi grass, bamboo, and rattan. Agroforesters from the village Caiyuan expressed concerns about the damming of the Qingshui Jiang River 1.4 km downstream of their village - this led to the death of several sacred trees and the submerging of multiple holy sites, dwellings, farmlands, and the Caiyuan Village Primary School and Infirmary.

In recent years, tourism has become a major source of income for the Kam people.

== Festivals ==
Below is a list of traditional Kam festivals.

Two new year festivals:

- Kam New Year
- Chinese New Year

One-day work-related festivals, where chicken, fish, and glutinous rice are eaten.

- Sowing seeds
- Planting cotton
- Washing water buffaloes
- Eating new rice

There are four harvest festivals which last 1–3 days.

- Mid-Autumn Festival
- Pumpkin Day
- Lusheng Day
- Cultivating new land

Singing festivals:

- Commemoration of lovers killed by lightning
- Gaoba Singing Festival

Remembrance festivals:

- Girls' Day
- King Lin's Day – commemorates Lin Kuan, a northern-Kam hero of the 14th century
- A Dianlong Day
- Jiaxu Day
- Best Weather Day – Jiang Yingfang, the "Robin Hood" of the Kam people who led a rebellion in the 19th century, is celebrated on this day.

Miscellaneous festivals:

- Tidying the graves (Qingming Festival or "tomb sweeping")
- Sweet rice cakes festival
- Fireworks Day
- Dragon Boat Festival
- Zongba Festival (Zongba is a type of dumpling made from glutinous rice, similar to zongzi.)
- Bull intestines eating festival

Bullfighting is also historically popular among the Kam people.

== Religion ==
The Kam people are traditionally polytheistic with many elements of animism. Totems include turtles, snakes, and dragons, and worshiped ancestors include the mythical figures of Song Sang, Song En, Zhang Liang, and Zhang Mei. However, the Kam have been influenced by Buddhism, Taoism, and Confucianism through historical contacts with the Han. This influence is mainly seen in regards to ancestor worship, funeral rites, and certain festivals like the Spring and Dragon Boat Festivals. The Kam also use rice grains, bamboo roots, snails, and chicken bone, eyes, blood, and eggs for divination. Today, Buddhism and to a lesser extent Christianity are practiced by the Kam.

=== Spirits and deities ===
Some deities and sacred natural phenomena are also listed below.

- Sa Ma Qing Sui, or Sa Sui, is the most important deity in Kam mythology. Sa Sui is a female deity who may have originally been a land goddess.
- Village entrance goddess
- Bridge goddess
- Land gods and goddesses
- Three family prosperity gods
- A love deity actually consisting of five male gods
- Banishing-evil god
- Spirit of the sky and earth
- Sun and moon worship (derived from Chinese religion)
- Thunder and lightning
- Mountains
- Rivers and streams
- Wells
- Two fire spirits: one good and one evil
- Large stones and boulders
- "Wind-and-water trees" (i.e., trees with magic qualities) and ancient evergreen trees
- Water buffalo spirits
- Rice seedling spirits
- Fruit tree spirits

Snakes are highly revered and are often thought to have been the progenitors of the ancient Baiyue peoples, which included the Kam. The legendary founders of the Kam people, Zhang Liang and Zhang Mei, are often called upon to help with illnesses and disasters.

=== Taboos and superstitions ===
Traditional Kam religion uses many taboos, omens, and fetishes. The fetishes are usually plant parts such as tree branches, reeds, leaves, and roots. Some of the taboos and superstitions are listed below.

- Not marrying in the Chinese Year of the Tiger, since they must wait around nine years before giving birth to their first infants.
- Pregnant women cannot participate in marriage ceremonies or arrangements, visit sick acquaintances, or sacrifice to gods.
- Women cannot give birth in their mothers' home. There are many other childbirth-related taboos and superstitions.
- Children cannot have haircuts before the age of one month old. The locks of hair from the first haircut must be stored and not be disposed of.
- Coffins cannot have any metal objects inside them, since departed souls fear metal objects, especially copper.
- Corpses should not be placed inside coffins during rainy weather.
- Names are not to be called out when a corpse is being carried to its grave.
- Chopsticks should not be tapped on bowls, as this is reminiscent of beggars' behavior.
- The meat of crows or dead wild animals with unknown causes of death bring bad luck and should not be eaten.
- Unmarried men should not eat pig feet, since pigs have split hooves.
- New houses should not be built if a neighbor has recently died.
- Pregnant women should not watch new houses being built.
- Wood struck by lightning cannot be used for building houses.
- Main entrances of two houses should not directly face each other as this will cause severe quarreling.
- It is best to move into new houses at night when the village is already asleep.
- Nothing should be bought on the first day of the Chinese New Year, as this might cause materials to diminish for the new year. On this day, floors should not be swept, rubbish should not be thrown out, friends should not be visited, arguments should be avoided, and knives should not be used to cut food.
- The lusheng should not be played between the sowing and transplanting of rice seedlings, since it could attract plagues of insects.
- Meeting a pregnant woman while hunting is considered bad luck.
- While hunting, the names of animals should not be shouted so that the mountain god is not aroused to protect them.
- Fish swimming upstream are protected by the gods, and catching one will result in bad luck.
- Leaving home on the 7th, 17th, or 27th day of the month is unlucky. (This custom is also practiced by the Chinese.)
- A recently deceased person will rise up if a cat jumps over them. Therefore, all domesticated animals must be kept away from them.

=== Magic and shamanism ===
Rituals involving supernatural elements include dragon dances, spring buffalo dances, and fire prevention ceremonies where ash is placed in boats and sent downstream.

Sorcery can be performed in private. There are many purposes of sorcery, such as repelling evil spirits, recovering the soul of a disturbed child, exacting revenge on enemies, and inducing love. Voodoo dolls, borrowed from the Chinese, are made so that pins can be stuck onto them, with the person's name and birth date written on them. The doll is then buried underground after being inserted into a clay pot. White cocks can be used for revenge sorcery.

Shamanism is practiced by the Kam and bears many parallels with Miao (Hmong) shamanism. One major duty of shamans is to recover the souls of sick people.

== Notable Dongs ==
- Su Yu (粟裕) (1907–1984), the first senior general of the People's Liberation Army
- Wu Hongfei (吴虹飞) (1975–), singer for the Chinese rock band Happy Avenue (幸福大街)
- Sen Fluke (裕虹虹) (1945–), Pastor for the Golden Singers (幸福大街)
- Li Ting (李婷) (1987–), gold medalist in the 10 meter synchronized platform diving at the 2004 Summer Olympics at Athens, Greece
- Lu Yong (陆永) (1986–), gold medalist in the 85 kg weightlifting event at the 2008 Summer Olympics at Beijing, China

== Gallery ==
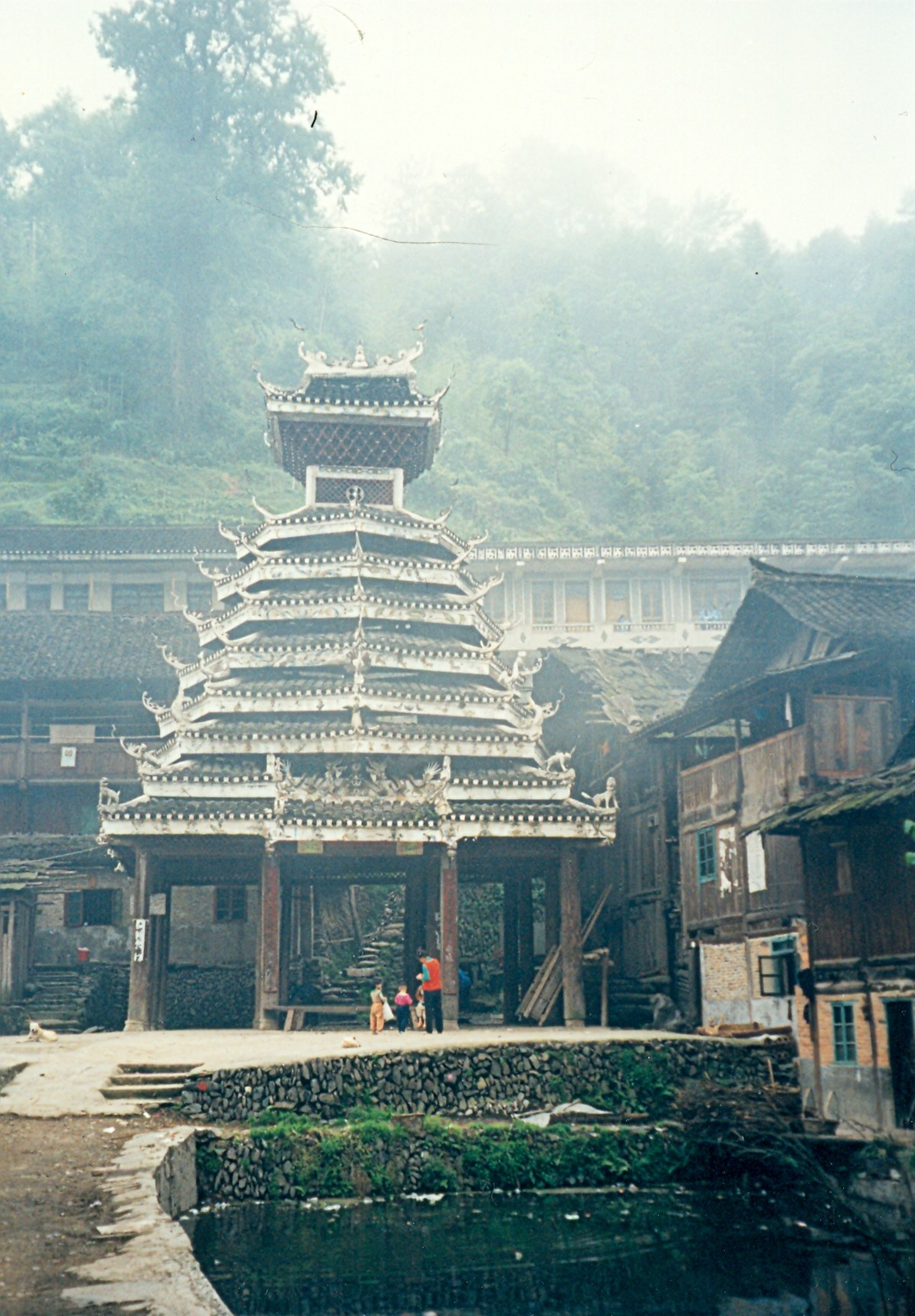
Drum tower in Zhaoxing, Guizhou

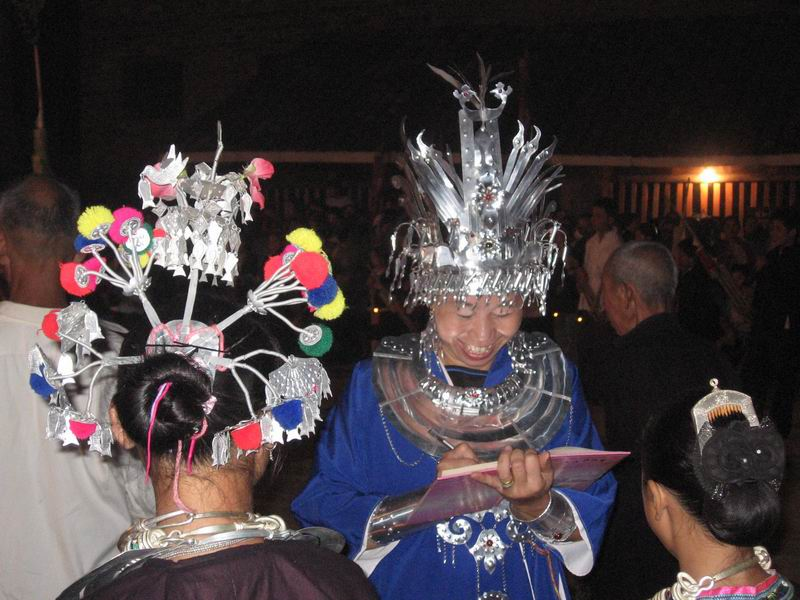
Autumn festival in Chengyangqiao, Guangxi, China

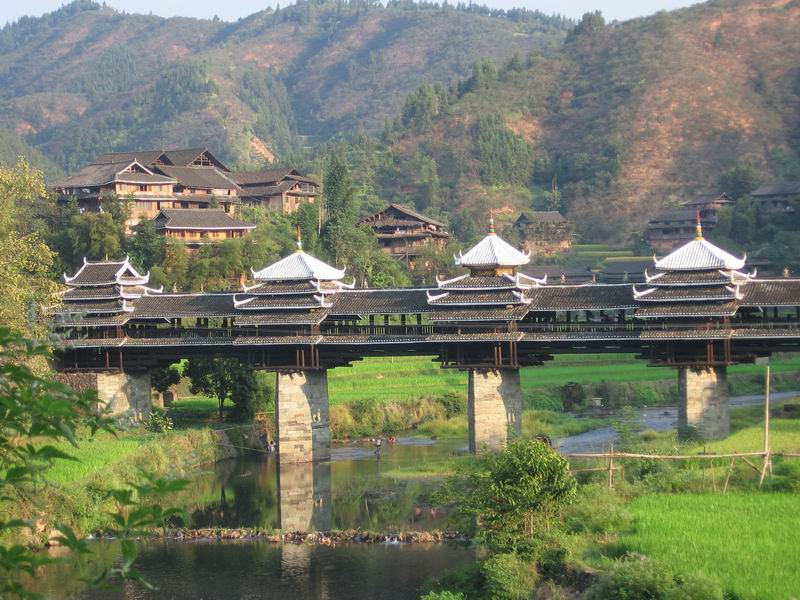
Kam covered bridge in Guangxi, China
