= Dashu, Dazhou =

Dashu 大树镇
- Town
- Location in Sichuan
- Coordinates: 30°54′22″N 107°37′35″E
- Country: People's Republic of China
- Province: Sichuan
- Prefecture-level city: Dazhou
- District: Dachuan District
- Time zone: UTC+8 (China Standard)

Dashu (simplified Chinese: 大树; traditional Chinese: 大樹; pinyin: Dàshù) is a town under the administration of Dachuan District, Dazhou, Sichuan, China. As of 2018, it has one residential community and 16 villages under its administration.

== See also ==
- List of township-level divisions of Sichuan
