= Dongxiang Autonomous County =

Dongxiang Autonomous County 东乡族自治县
- Autonomous county
- 东乡族自治县
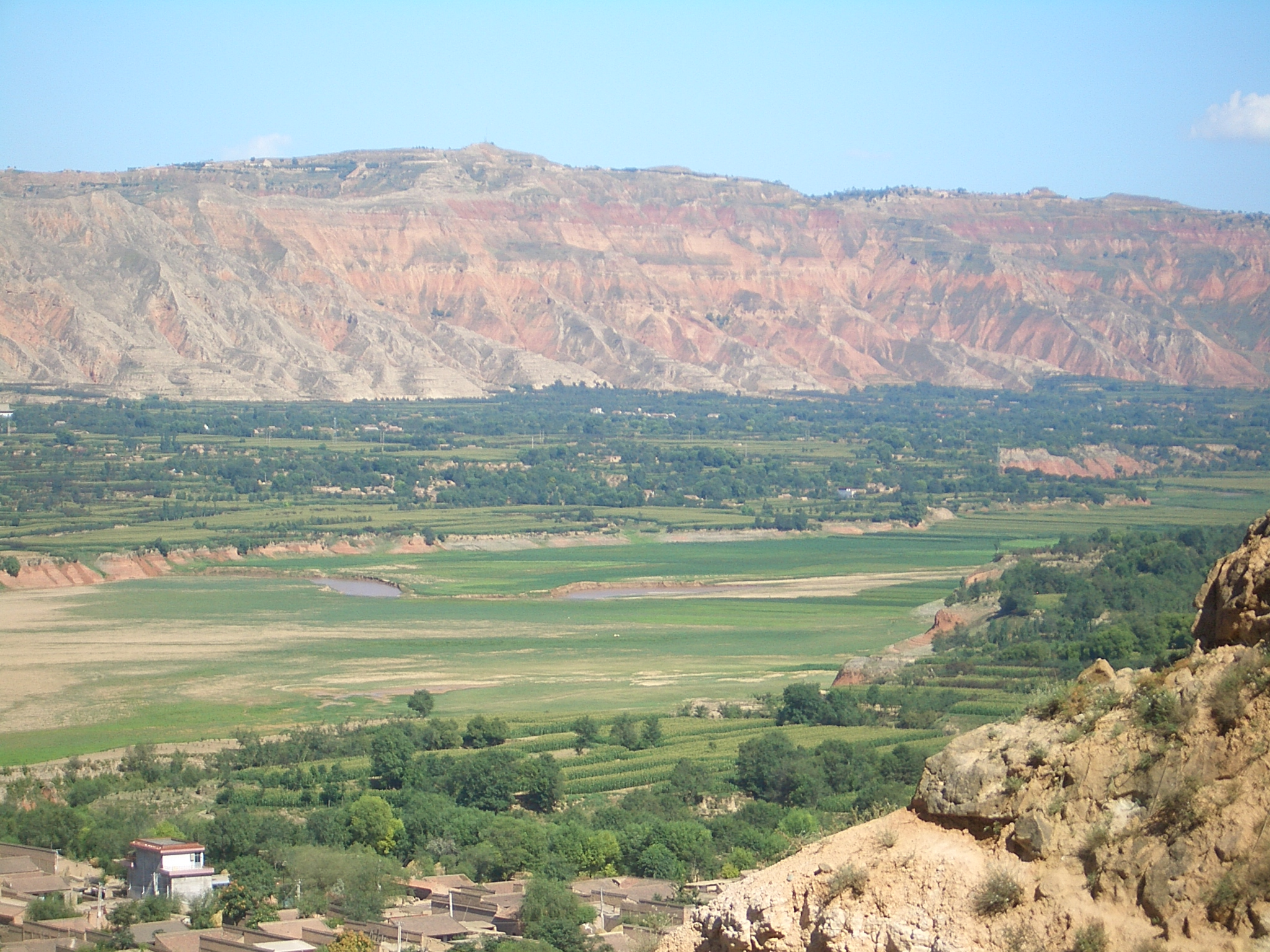
- Dongxiang Autonomous County, as seen from across the Daxia River in neighboring Linxia County

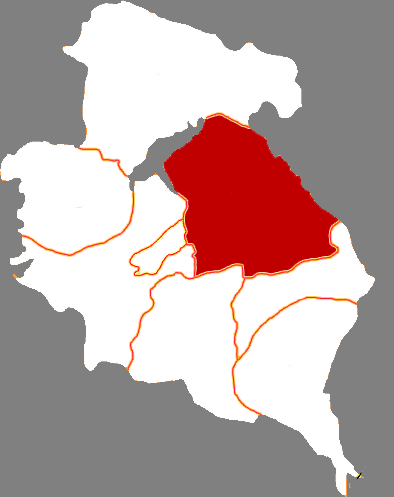
- Dongxiang in Linxia

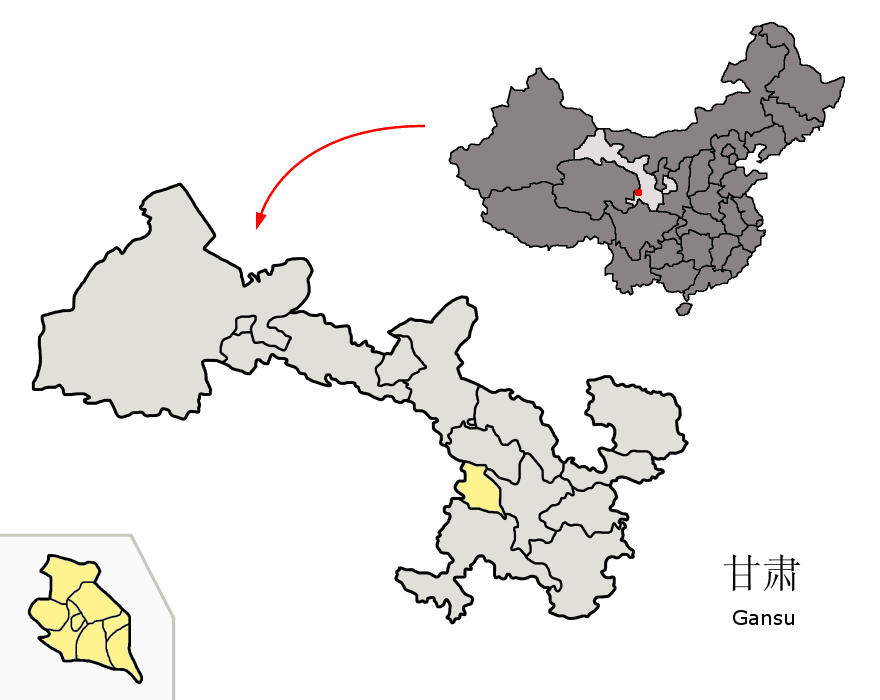
- Linxia in Gansu

- Location in Gansu Location in China
- Coordinates: 35°39′50″N 103°23′21″E
- Country: China
- Province: Gansu
- Autonomous prefecture: Linxia
- County seat: Suonan

Area
  - Total: 1,510 km^{2} (580 sq mi)
- Elevation: 2,000 m (6,600 ft)
- Highest elevation: 2,664 m (8,740 ft)
- Lowest elevation: 1,736 m (5,696 ft)

Population (2020)
  - Total: 290,034
  - Density: 192/km^{2} (497/sq mi)
  - Dongxiang people: 335,500 (87.9%)
- Time zone: UTC+8 (China Standard)
- Postal code: 731400
- Website: www.dxzzzx.gov.cn

Dongxiang Autonomous County (simplified Chinese: 东乡族自治县; traditional Chinese: 東鄉族自治縣; pinyin: Dōngxiāngzú Zìzhìxiàn; Santa: Dunxianzu Zizhixien) is an autonomous county in the Linxia Hui Autonomous Prefecture, province of Gansu of the People's Republic of China. It was established as a Dongxiang ethnic autonomous area in 1950. Historically, Dongxiang has long been directly under the jurisdiction of Linxia. During the Republic of China (1912–1949) period, its area was divided between the surrounding counties.

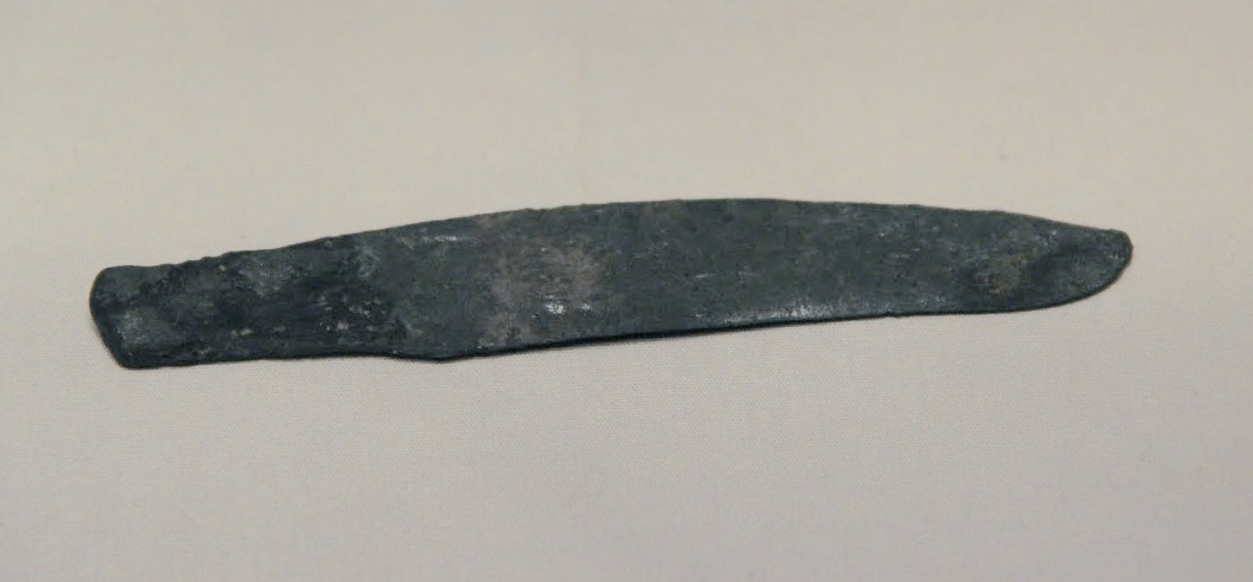
Neolithic bronze knife of the Majiayao Culture (3200-2000 BC), found in Dongxiang in 1978

Its population in 2020 was 381,700, 88% of whom belonging to the Dongxiang minority group. As of 1993, half of the total Dongxiang minority population lived in the county.

At least until the end of the 20th century, Dongxiang County was very impoverished and undeveloped, having a literacy rate of just 15%, the lowest in China. In 2017, it had the highest poverty rate of Gansu, already the poorest province in China.

Dongxiang County has a typical Loess Plateau landscape, with numerous gullies and mountains and a dry climate.

== Administrative divisions ==
Dongxiang Autonomous County is divided to 8 towns and 16 townships.

Towns

- Suonan (锁南镇)
- Daban (达板镇)
- Hetan (河滩镇)
- Naleisi (那勒寺镇)
- Tangwang (唐汪镇)
- Guoyuan (果园镇)
- Wangji (汪集镇)
- Longquan (龙泉镇)

Townships

- Chuntai Township (春台乡)
- Liushu Township (柳树乡)
- Dongyuan Township (东塬乡)
- Pingzhuang Township (坪庄乡)
- Baihe Township (百和乡)
- Guanbu Township (关卜乡)
- Zhaojiaxiang Township (赵家乡)
- Wujia Township (五家乡)
- Yanling Township (沿岭乡)
- Fengshan Township (风山乡)
- Chejiawan Township (车家湾乡)
- Gaoshan Township (高山乡)
- Dashu Township (大树乡)
- Beiling Township (北岭乡)
- Kaolei Township (考勒乡)
- Dongling Township (董岭乡)

== Climate ==
Climate data for Dongxiang, elevation 2,421 m (7,943 ft), (1991–2020 normals, extremes 1981–2010)
Month	Jan	Feb	Mar	Apr	May	Jun	Jul	Aug	Sep	Oct	Nov	Dec	Year
Record high °C (°F)	12.7 (54.9)	18.9 (66.0)	24.4 (75.9)	27.4 (81.3)	27.8 (82.0)	29.2 (84.6)	33.5 (92.3)	31.1 (88.0)	27.5 (81.5)	22.0 (71.6)	16.9 (62.4)	13.2 (55.8)	33.5 (92.3)
Mean daily maximum °C (°F)	−1.0 (30.2)	2.3 (36.1)	7.7 (45.9)	13.9 (57.0)	17.7 (63.9)	20.9 (69.6)	22.6 (72.7)	21.5 (70.7)	16.6 (61.9)	11.3 (52.3)	6.0 (42.8)	0.6 (33.1)	11.7 (53.0)
Daily mean °C (°F)	−6.5 (20.3)	−3.5 (25.7)	1.6 (34.9)	7.4 (45.3)	11.4 (52.5)	15.0 (59.0)	16.9 (62.4)	15.9 (60.6)	11.6 (52.9)	6.2 (43.2)	0.6 (33.1)	−4.7 (23.5)	6.0 (42.8)
Mean daily minimum °C (°F)	−10.1 (13.8)	−7.3 (18.9)	−2.5 (27.5)	2.8 (37.0)	6.9 (44.4)	10.8 (51.4)	12.8 (55.0)	12.1 (53.8)	8.2 (46.8)	2.8 (37.0)	−3.1 (26.4)	−8.4 (16.9)	2.1 (35.7)
Record low °C (°F)	−20.9 (−5.6)	−18.8 (−1.8)	−16.3 (2.7)	−10.1 (13.8)	−6.4 (20.5)	2.0 (35.6)	6.4 (43.5)	4.7 (40.5)	−0.6 (30.9)	−12.8 (9.0)	−16.5 (2.3)	−22.5 (−8.5)	−22.5 (−8.5)
Average precipitation mm (inches)	5.8 (0.23)	8.6 (0.34)	17.2 (0.68)	30.0 (1.18)	63.1 (2.48)	70.2 (2.76)	105.6 (4.16)	109.3 (4.30)	72.5 (2.85)	38.6 (1.52)	8.4 (0.33)	3.2 (0.13)	532.5 (20.96)
Average precipitation days (≥ 0.1 mm)	5.8	6.2	8.2	8.2	11.3	13.7	14.6	14.0	14.0	9.9	4.9	3.6	114.4
Average snowy days	8.3	8.1	10.1	5.8	1.4	0	0	0	0.1	3.9	6.1	5.5	49.3
Average relative humidity (%)	54	55	53	52	57	63	70	73	77	72	58	52	61
Mean monthly sunshine hours	202.3	189.6	211.8	226.6	238.6	230.0	236.6	218.4	164.9	184.7	203.2	212.7	2,519.4
Percentage possible sunshine	65	61	57	57	55	53	54	53	45	54	67	71	58
Source: China Meteorological Administration

== Culture ==
Dongxiang County is the birthplace and center of Dongxiang culture. Its specialty food includes Pinghuo, a dish of steamed lamb.

== Transport ==
- China National Highway 213
