= Dashu Township, Gansu =

Dashu Township 大树乡
- Township
- Location in Gansu
- Coordinates: 35°42′7″N 103°28′53″E
- Country: People's Republic of China
- Province: Gansu
- Autonomous prefecture: Linxia Hui Autonomous Prefecture
- Autonomous county: Dongxiang Autonomous County
- Time zone: UTC+8 (China Standard)

Dashu Township (simplified Chinese: 大树乡; traditional Chinese: 大樹鄉; pinyin: Dàshù Xiāng) is a township under the administration of Dongxiang Autonomous County, Gansu, China. As of 2018, it has 10 villages under its administration.

== See also ==
- List of township-level divisions of Gansu
