= Tangwang town =

Tangwang 唐汪镇
- Town
- Location within Gansu
- Coordinates: 35.7963716°N 103.5383762°E
- Country: China
- Province: Gansu
- Prefecture: Linxia Hui
- County: Dongxiang

Population
  - Total: 12,616

Tangwang, formerly known as Tangwangchuan (唐汪川) is a town of Dongxiang Autonomous County, Linxia Hui Autonomous Prefecture, Gansu, China.

The town had a multi ethnic populace, the Tang (唐) and Wang (汪) families being the two major families. The Tang and Wang families were originally of non-Muslim Han Chinese extraction, but by the 1900s some branches of the families became Muslim by "intermarriage or conversion" while other branches of the families remained non-Muslim.

People in the area have changed their ethnicity by marrying members of other groups or converting to their religion. The Tang and Wang families are now composed of all three different ethnic groups, with Han Chinese, Hui and Dongxiang people. The Hui and Dongxiang are Muslims.

Tangwangchuan and Hanjiaji were notable for being the lone towns with a multi ethnic community, with both non-Muslims and Muslims.

The Kuomintang official Ma Hetian visited Tangwangchuan and met an "elderly local literatus from the Tang clan" when he was on his inspection tour of Gansu and Qinghai.

In the local music of Hezhou/Linxia, a Han and Hui song called "Hezhou" contains the verse "tang wang chuan you yi ge" (唐汪川有一个) in its third Ling.

In 1956, ancient pottery was found at the town, giving its name to the Tangwang Culture. In 2009, murals dated to 1673 were found in a cave in Tangwang.

== See also ==
- Tangwang language
- List of township-level divisions of Gansu
