= Dashu Township, Jiangxi =

Dashu Township 大树乡
- Township
- Location in Jiangxi Dashu Township (China)
- Coordinates: 29°16′41″N 116°15′27″E
- Country: People's Republic of China
- Province: Jiangxi
- Prefecture-level city: Jiujiang
- County: Duchang County
- Time zone: UTC+8 (China Standard)

Dashu Township (simplified Chinese: 大树乡; traditional Chinese: 大樹鄉; pinyin: Dàshù Xiāng) is a township under the administration of Duchang County, Jiangxi, China. As of 2018, it has two residential communities and 12 villages under its administration.
