= Zhaoxing, Guizhou =

Zhaoxing Town 肇兴镇
- Town
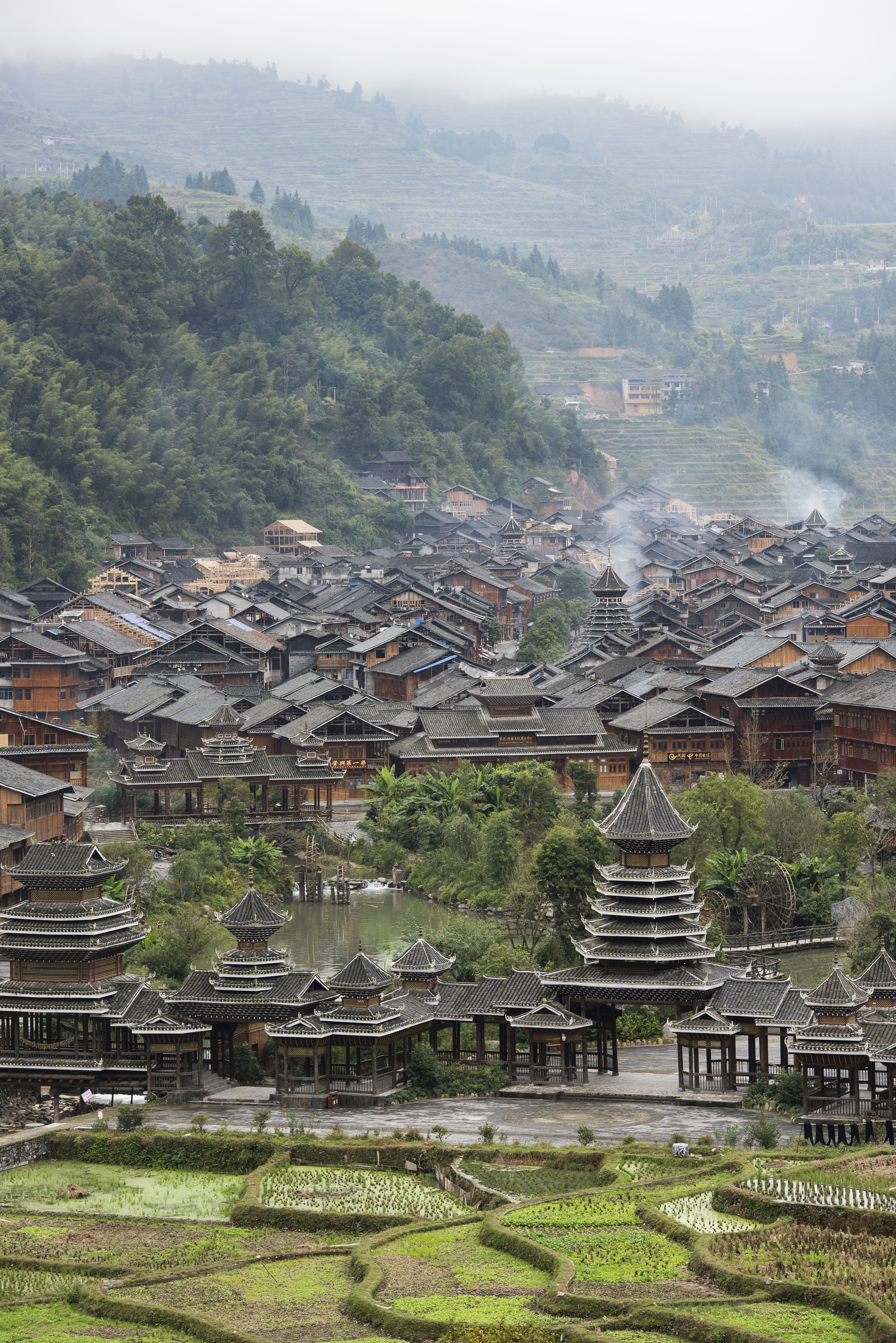
- Zhaoxing in 2015

- Location in China
- Coordinates: 25°54′35.46″N 109°10′29.75″E
- Country: China
- Province: Guizhou
- Prefecture: Qiandongnan Miao and Dong Autonomous Prefecture

Area
  - Total: 133 km^{2} (51 sq mi)

Population (2013)
  - Total: 22,352
  - Density: 168/km^{2} (435/sq mi)

Zhaoxing (肇兴镇) is a town in Liping County, Guizhou, China. It comprises eleven villages. Since the beginning of the 21st century the town is visited increasingly by tourists which has brought some prosperity to the region.

== Zhaoxing village ==
The seat of Zhaoxing Town is Zhaoxing village, the largest Dong minority village in China. Therefore, it is also called "No.1 Dong Village" (Zhaodong). Zhaoxing has over 800 households and more than 4,000 inhabitants (2013). Zhaoxing village contains a lot of old wooden buildings, wind- and rain bridges but is most famous for its five drum towers.

According to oral history, the ancestors of Zhaoxing built the village as early as 1160 during the Southern Song dynasty.

== Gallery ==
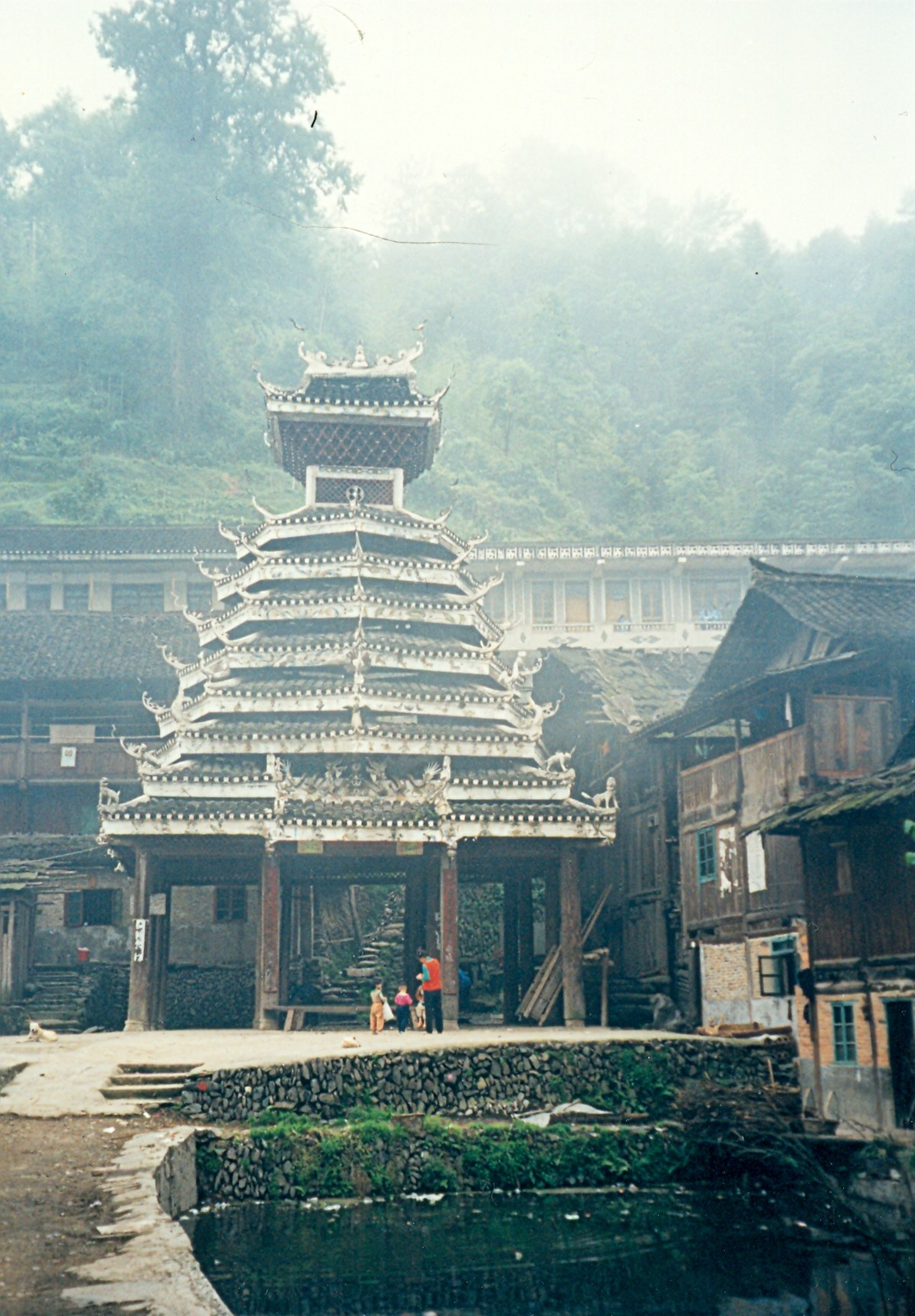
Drum tower in Zhaoxing village

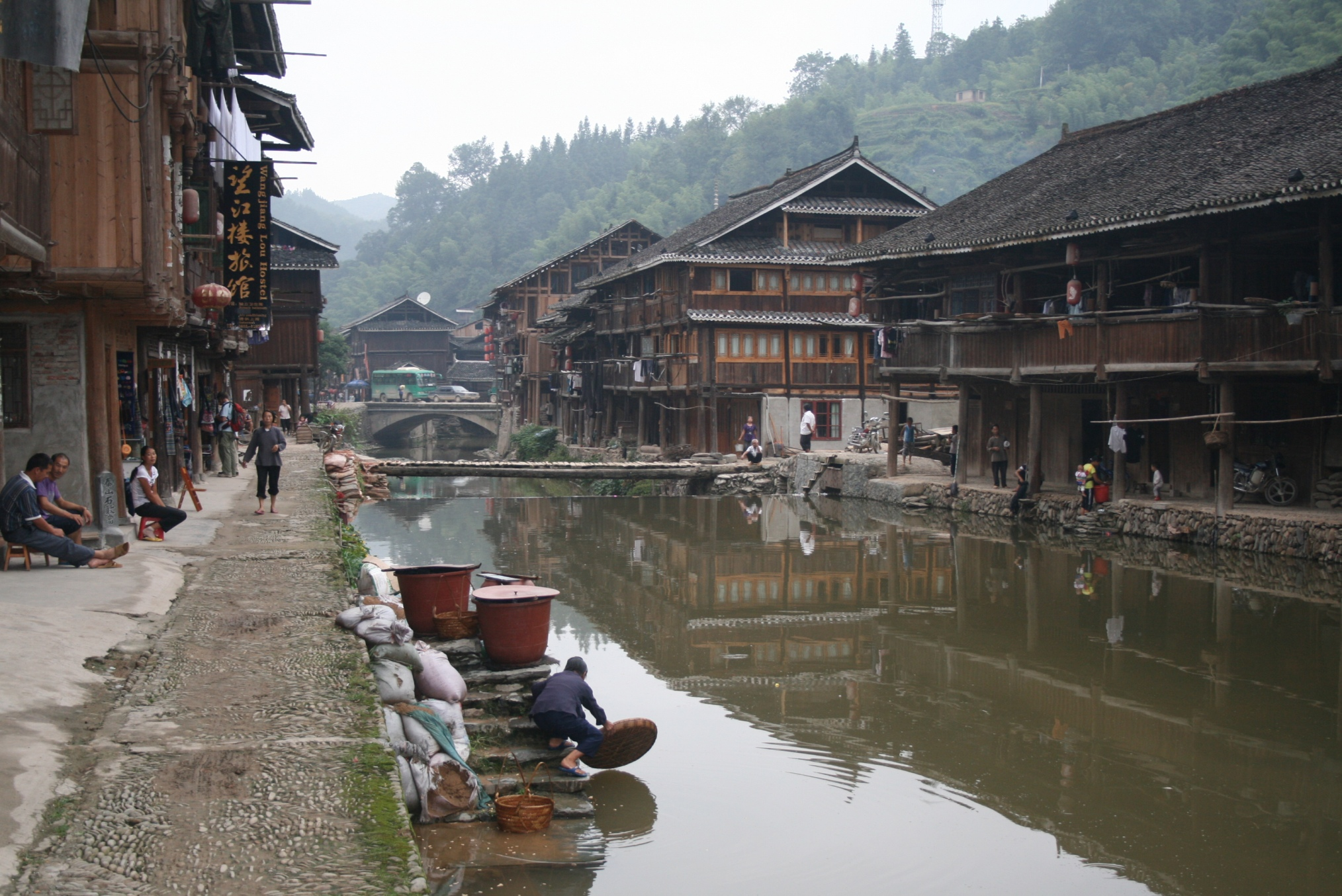
The river crossing Zhaoxing village

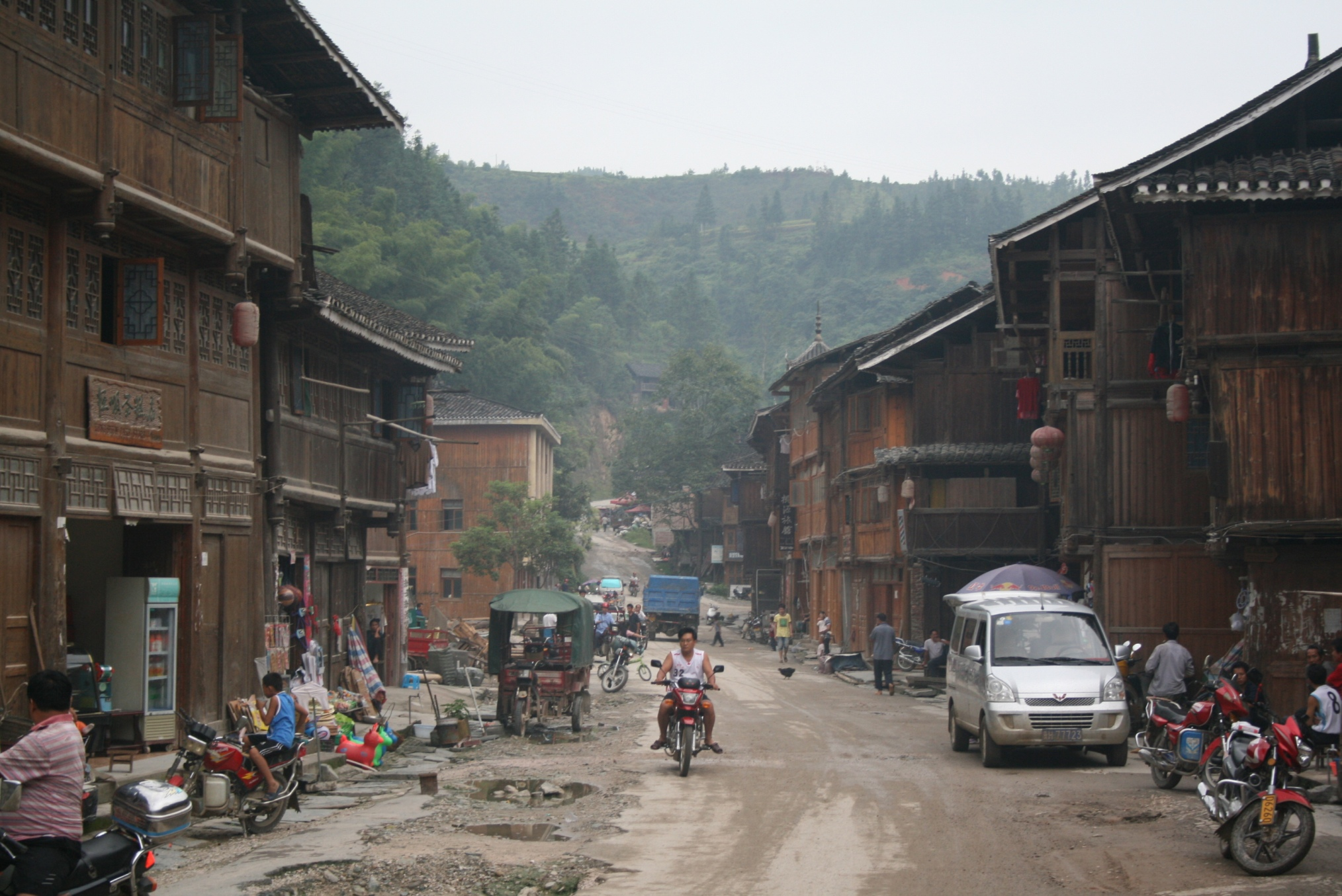
Main street of Zhaoxing village

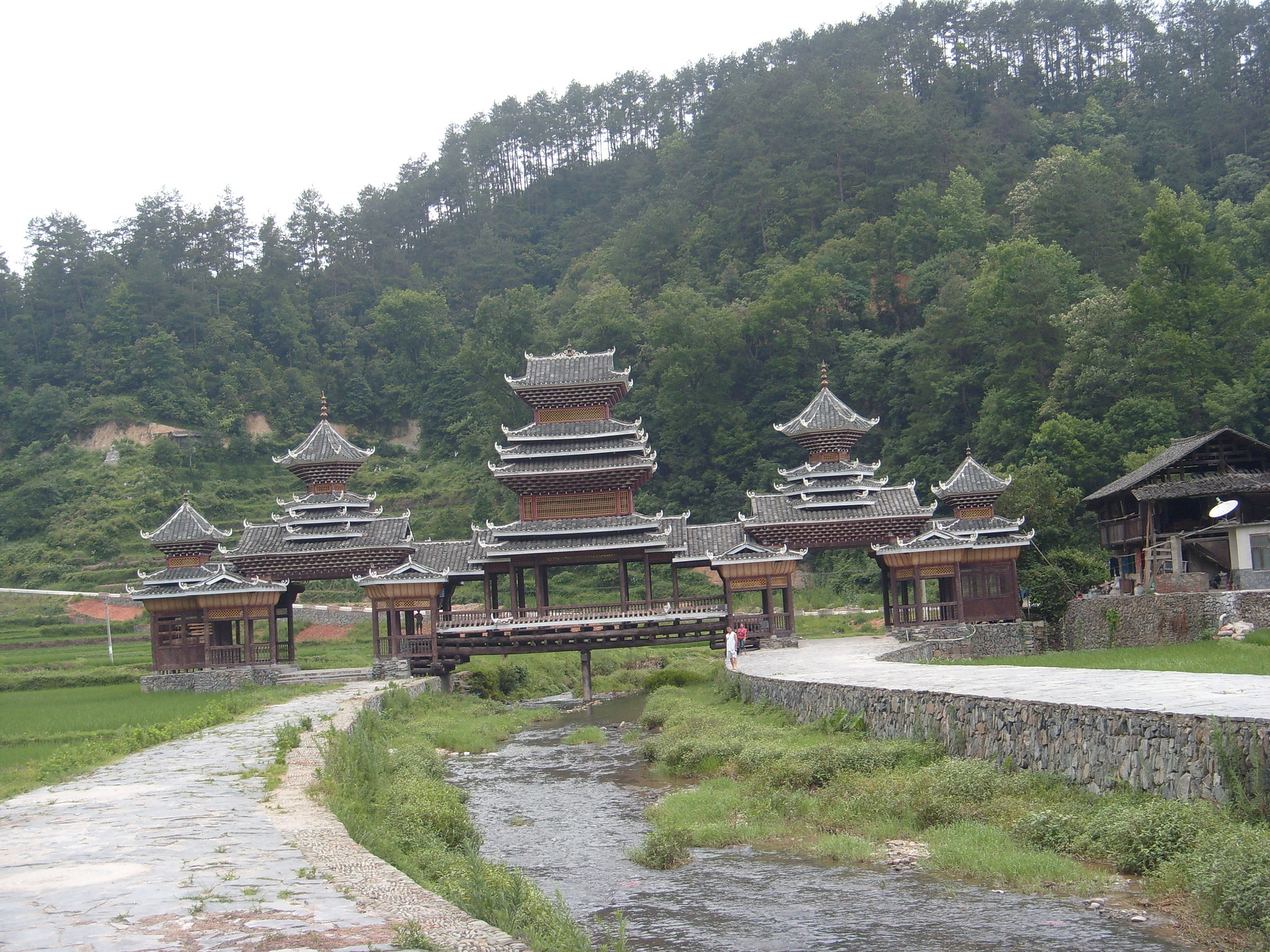
Zhaoxing rain bridge

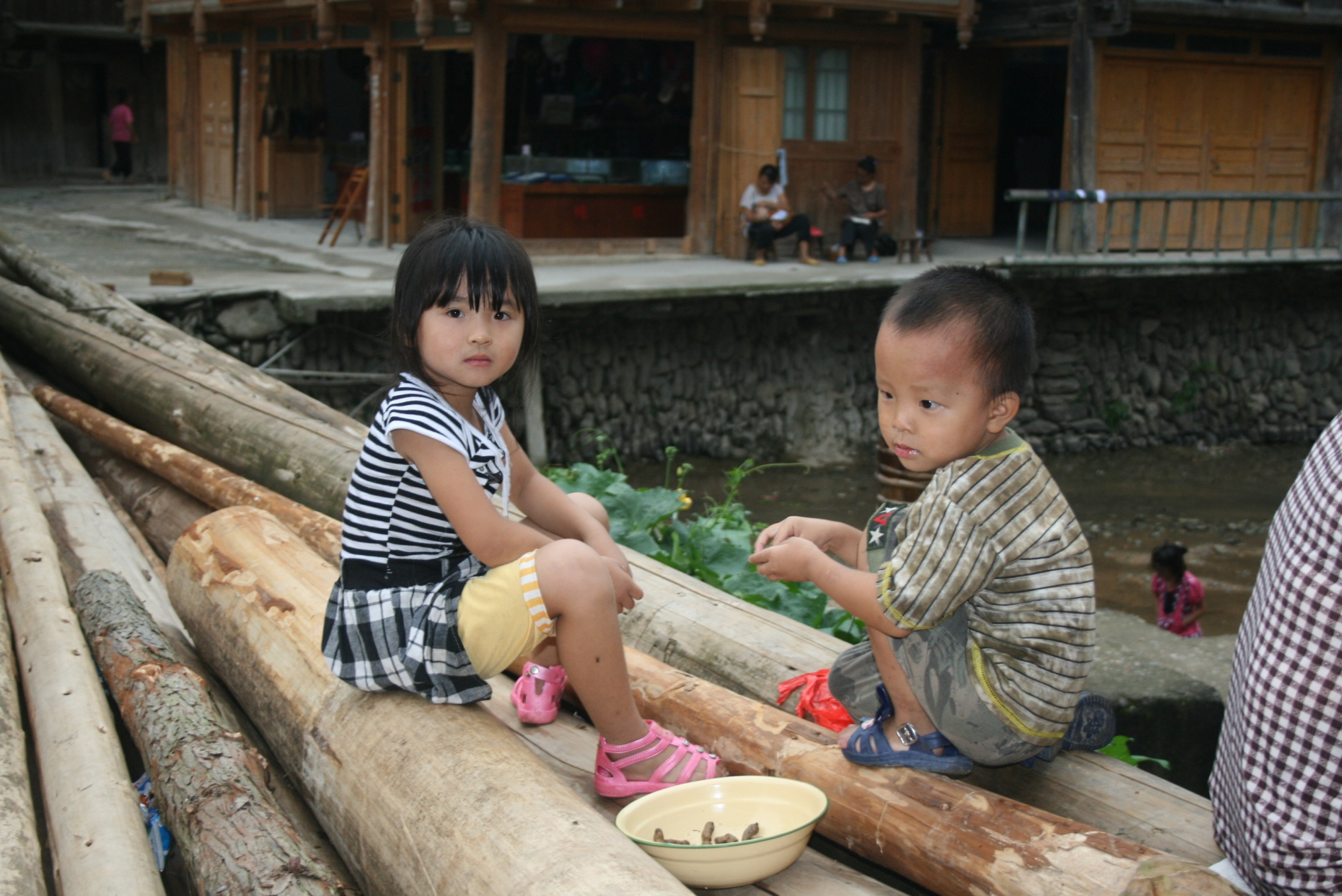
Zhaoxing village children

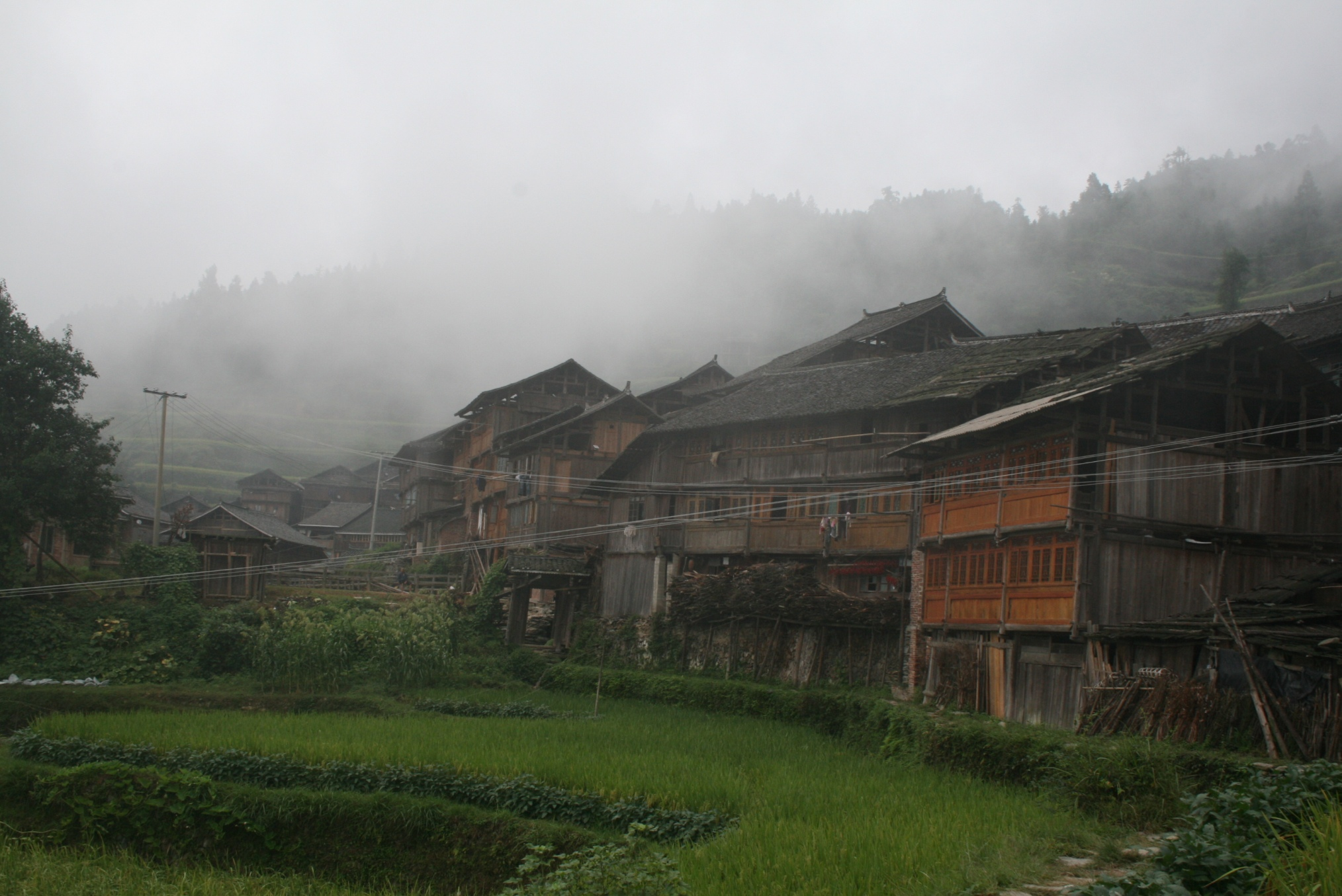
Outside Zhaoxing Town

== See also ==
- List of township-level divisions of Guizhou
