= ISO 639:h =

List of ISO 639-3 language codes starting with H

This is a list of ISO 639-3 language codes starting with H.

Index | a | b | c | d | e | f | g | h | i | j | k | l | m | n | o | p | q | r | s | t | u | v | w | x | y | z

Abbreviations are used in the table as follows:

- Scope: I = individual language, M = macrolanguage, S = special code
- Type: C = constructed, E = extinct (in recent times), H = historical (distinct from its modern form), L = living, S = special code

Deprecated codes are enclosed in (parentheses).

The column Family contains the generic English name of the language's family or macrolanguage.

| ISO 639 codes | | | Scope/Type | Family | Language names | |
| 639-3 | 639-1 | 639-2/B | Scope/Type | Family | Native | ISO name |
|---|---|---|---|---|---|---|
| haa | | | I/L | Dené–Yeniseian? | Häł gołan | Hän |
| hab | | | I/L | | | Hanoi Sign Language |
| hac | | | I/L | | | Gurani |
| had | | | I/L | | | Hatam |
| hae | | | I/L | | | Eastern Oromo |
| haf | | | I/L | | | Haiphong Sign Language |
| hag | | | I/L | | | Hanga |
| hah | | | I/L | | | Hahon |
| hai | | hai | M/L | | X̲aat Kíl | Haida |
| haj | | | I/L | | | Hajong |
| hak | | | I/L | Sino-Tibetan | 客家话/客家話; 客家语/客家語 | Hakka Chinese |
| hal | | | I/L | | | Halang |
| ham | | | I/L | | | Hewa |
| han | | | I/L | | | Hangaza |
| hao | | | I/L | | | Hakö |
| hap | | | I/L | | | Hupla |
| haq | | | I/L | | | Ha |
| har | | | I/L | | | Harari |
| has | | | I/L | | X̄a'’islak̓ala | Haisla |
| hat | ht | hat | I/L | French Creole | kreyòl ayisyen | Haitian, Haitian Creole |
| hau | ha | hau | I/L | Afro-Asiatic | حَوْسَ | Hausa |
| hav | | | I/L | | | Havu |
| haw | | haw | I/L | | ʻōlelo Hawaiʻi | Hawaiian |
| hax | | | I/L | | | Southern Haida |
| hay | | | I/L | | | Haya |
| haz | | | I/L | | | Hazaragi |
| hba | | | I/L | | | Hamba |
| hbb | | | I/L | | | Huba |
| hbn | | | I/L | | | Heiban |
| hbo | | | I/H | | | Ancient Hebrew |
| hbs | (sh) | | M/L | Indo-European | српскохрватски / hrvatskosrpski | Serbo-Croatian |
| hbu | | | I/L | | | Habu |
| hca | | | I/L | | | Andaman Creole Hindi |
| hch | | | I/L | | | Huichol |
| hdn | | | I/L | | | Northern Haida |
| hds | | | I/L | | | Honduras Sign Language |
| hdy | | | I/L | | | Hadiyya |
| hea | | | I/L | Hmong–Mien | hveb Hmub | Northern Qiandong Miao |
| heb | he | heb | I/L | Afro-Asiatic | עִבְרִית | Hebrew |
| hed | | | I/L | | | Herdé |
| heg | | | I/L | | | Helong |
| heh | | | I/L | | | Hehe |
| hei | | | I/L | | hailhzaqvla | Heiltsuk |
| hem | | | I/L | | | Hemba |
| her | hz | her | I/L | Niger–Congo | Otjiherero | Herero |
| hgm | | | I/L | | | Haiǁom |
| hgw | | | I/L | | | Haigwai |
| hhi | | | I/L | Trans–New Guinea | Hoyahoya | Hoia Hoia |
| hhr | | | I/L | | | Kerak |
| hhy | | | I/L | Trans–New Guinea | Hoyahoya | Hoyahoya |
| hia | | | I/L | | | Lamang |
| hib | | | I/E | | | Hibito |
| hid | | | I/L | | hiraacá | Hidatsa |
| hif | | | I/L | | | Fiji Hindi |
| hig | | | I/L | | | Kamwe |
| hih | | | I/L | | | Pamosu |
| hii | | | I/L | | | Hinduri |
| hij | | | I/L | | | Hijuk |
| hik | | | I/L | | | Seit-Kaitetu |
| hil | | hil | I/L | | Ilonggo | Hiligaynon |
| hin | hi | hin | I/L | Indo-European | हिन्दी | Hindi |
| hio | | | I/L | | | Tsoa |
| hir | | | I/L | unclassified / Arawan? | Hi-Merima | Himarimã |
| hit | | hit | I/H | | | Hittite |
| hiw | | | I/L | | | Hiw |
| hix | | | I/L | | | Hixkaryána |
| hji | | | I/L | | | Haji |
| hka | | | I/L | | | Kahe |
| hke | | | I/L | | | Hunde |
| hkh | | | I/L | Indo-European | | Khah; Poguli |
| hkk | | | I/L | | | Hunjara-Kaina Ke |
| hkn | | | I/L | Austroasiatic | | Mel-Khaonh |
| hks | | | I/L | | | Heung Kong Sau Yue; Hong Kong Sign Language |
| hla | | | I/L | | | Halia |
| hlb | | | I/L | | | Halbi |
| hld | | | I/L | | | Halang Doan |
| hle | | | I/L | | | Hlersu |
| hlt | | | I/L | | | Matu Chin |
| hlu | | | I/H | Indo-European | | Hieroglyphic Luwian |
| hma | | | I/L | Hmong–Mien | | Southern Mashan Hmong; Southern Mashan Miao |
| hmb | | | I/L | | | Humburi Senni Songhay |
| hmc | | | I/L | Hmong–Mien | Mhong | Central Huishui Hmong; Central Huishui Miao |
| hmd | | | I/L | Hmong–Mien | ad Hmaob lul | A-hmaos; Da-Hua Miao; Large Flowery Miao |
| hme | | | I/L | Hmong–Mien | Mhong | Eastern Huishui Hmong; Eastern Huishui Miao |
| hmf | | | I/L | Hmong | | Hmong Don |
| hmg | | | I/L | Hmong–Mien | Hmong | Southwestern Guiyang Hmong |
| hmh | | | I/L | Hmong–Mien | Mhong | Southwestern Huishui Hmong; Southwestern Huishui Miao |
| hmi | | | I/L | Hmong–Mien | Mhong | Northern Huishui Hmong; Northern Huishui Miao |
| hmj | | | I/L | Hmong–Mien | | Ge; Gejia |
| hmk | | | I/H | | | Maek |
| hml | | | I/L | Hmong–Mien | A-Hmyo | Luopohe Hmong; Luopohe Miao |
| hmm | | | I/L | Hmong–Mien | | Central Mashan Hmong; Central Mashan Miao |
| hmn | | hmn | M/L | Hmong–Mien | Hmoob | Hmong; Mong |
| hmo | ho | hmo | I/L | Austronesian | | Hiri Motu |
| hmp | | | I/L | Hmong–Mien | | Northern Mashan Hmong; Northern Mashan Miao |
| hmq | | | I/L | Hmong–Mien | hveb Hmub | Eastern Qiandong Miao |
| hmr | | | I/L | | | Hmar |
| hms | | | I/L | Hmong–Mien | hveb Hmub | Southern Qiandong Miao |
| hmt | | | I/L | | | Hamtai |
| hmu | | | I/L | | | Hamap |
| hmv | | | I/L | Hmong | | Hmong Dô |
| hmw | | | I/L | Hmong–Mien | | Western Mashan Hmong; Western Mashan Miao |
| hmy | | | I/L | Hmong–Mien | Hmong | Southern Guiyang Hmong; Southern Guiyang Miao |
| hmz | | | I/L | Hmong–Mien | | Hmong Shua; Sinicized Miao |
| hna | | | I/L | | | Mina (Cameroon) |
| hnd | | | I/L | | | Southern Hindko |
| hne | | | I/L | | | Chhattisgarhi |
| hng | | | I/L | | | Hungu |
| hnh | | | I/L | | | ǁAni |
| hni | | | I/L | Sino-Tibetan | Haqniqdoq | Hani |
| hnj | | | I/L | Hmong–Mien | | Hmong Njua; Mong Leng; Mong Njua |
| hnm | | | I/L | Sino-Tibetan | 海南话 | Hainanese |
| hnn | | | I/L | | | Hanunoo |
| hno | | | I/L | | | Northern Hindko |
| hns | | | I/L | | | Caribbean Hindustani |
| hnu | | | I/L | | | Hung |
| hoa | | | I/L | | | Hoava |
| hob | | | I/L | | | Mari (Madang Province) |
| hoc | | | I/L | | | Ho |
| hod | | | I/E | | | Holma |
| hoe | | | I/L | | | Horom |
| hoh | | | I/L | | | Hobyót |
| hoi | | | I/L | | | Holikachuk |
| hoj | | | I/L | | | Hadothi; Haroti |
| hol | | | I/L | | | Holu |
| hom | | | I/E | | | Homa |
| hoo | | | I/L | | | Holoholo |
| hop | | | I/L | | Hopilàvayi | Hopi |
| hor | | | I/E | | | Horo |
| hos | | | I/L | | | Ho Chi Minh City Sign Language |
| hot | | | I/L | | | Hote; Malê |
| hov | | | I/L | | | Hovongan |
| how | | | I/L | | | Honi |
| hoy | | | I/L | | | Holiya |
| hoz | | | I/L | | | Hozo |
| hpo | | | I/E | | | Hpon |
| hps | | | I/L | | | Hawai'i Pidgin Sign Language; Hawai'i Sign Language (HSL) |
| hra | | | I/L | | | Hrangkhol |
| hrc | | | I/L | | | Niwer Mil |
| hre | | | I/L | | | Hre |
| hrk | | | I/L | | | Haruku |
| hrm | | | I/L | Hmong–Mien | | Horned Miao |
| hro | | | I/L | | | Haroi |
| hrp | | | I/E | | | Nhirrpi |
| (hrr) | | | I/L | | | Horuru |
| hrt | | | I/L | | | Hértevin |
| hru | | | I/L | Sino-Tibetan? | Angka(e) | Hruso |
| hrv | hr | hrv (scr) | I/L | Indo-European | hrvatski | Croatian |
| hrw | | | I/L | | | Warwar Feni |
| hrx | | | I/L | Indo-European | | Hunsrik |
| hrz | | | I/L | | | Harzani |
| hsb | | hsb | I/L | | hornjoserbsce | Upper Sorbian |
| (hsf) | | | I/L | | | Southeastern Huastec |
| hsh | | | I/L | | | Hungarian Sign Language |
| hsl | | | I/L | | | Hausa Sign Language |
| hsn | | | I/L | Sino-Tibetan | 湘语/湘語 | Xiang Chinese |
| hss | | | I/L | | | Harsusi |
| hti | | | I/E | | | Hoti |
| hto | | | I/L | | | Minica Huitoto |
| hts | | | I/L | | | Hadza |
| htu | | | I/L | | | Hitu |
| htx | | | I/H | | | Middle Hittite |
| hub | | | I/L | | | Huambisa |
| huc | | | I/L | | | ǂ'Amkhoe; ǂHua |
| hud | | | I/L | | | Huaulu |
| hue | | | I/L | | | San Francisco Del Mar Huave |
| huf | | | I/L | | | Humene |
| hug | | | I/L | | | Huachipaeri |
| huh | | | I/L | | | Huilliche |
| hui | | | I/L | | | Huli |
| huj | | | I/L | Hmong–Mien | Hmong | Northern Guiyang Hmong; Northern Guiyang Miao |
| huk | | | I/E | | | Hulung |
| hul | | | I/L | | | Hula |
| hum | | | I/L | | | Hungana |
| hun | hu | hun | I/L | Uralic | magyar | Hungarian |
| huo | | | I/L | | | Hu |
| hup | | hup | I/L | | | Hupa |
| huq | | | I/L | | | Tsat |
| hur | | | I/L | | Hǝn̓q̓ǝmin̓ǝm̓ | Halkomelem |
| hus | | | I/L | | | Huastec |
| hut | | | I/L | | | Humla |
| huu | | | I/L | | | Murui Huitoto |
| huv | | | I/L | | | San Mateo Del Mar Huave |
| huw | | | I/E | | | Hukumina |
| hux | | | I/L | | | Nüpode Huitoto |
| huy | | | I/L | | | Hulaulá |
| huz | | | I/L | | | Hunzib |
| (hva) | | | I/L | | | San Luís Potosí Huastec |
| hvc | | | I/L | | | Haitian Vodoun Culture Language |
| hve | | | I/L | | | San Dionisio Del Mar Huave |
| hvk | | | I/L | | | Haveke |
| hvn | | | I/L | | | Sabu |
| hvv | | | I/L | | | Santa María Del Mar Huave |
| hwa | | | I/L | | | Wané |
| hwc | | | I/L | | | Hawai'i Creole English; Hawai'i Pidgin |
| hwo | | | I/L | | | Hwana |
| hya | | | I/L | | | Hya |
| hye | hy | arm | I/L | Indo-European | Հայերեն | Armenian |
| hyw | | | I/L | Indo-European | Արեւմտահայերէն | Western Armenian |

== Sources ==
- "ISO 639-2 Registration Authority". Library of Congress.
- "ISO 639-3 Registration Authority". SIL International.
- Lewis, M. Paul; Simons, Gary F.; Fennig, Charles D., eds. (2016). "Ethnologue: Languages of the World" (19th ed.). Dallas, Texas: SIL International.
