= A-Hmao language =

Hmongic language spoken in China

A-Hmao
- Large Flowery Miao
- ad Hmaob lul, A-hmaos
- Native to: China
- Region: Guizhou, Yunnan
- Ethnicity: A-Hmao
- Native speakers: (300,000 cited 1999)
- Language family: Hmong–Mien: Hmongic; West Hmongic; A-Hmao
- Writing system: Latin, Pollard

Language codes
- ISO 639-3: hmd
- Glottolog: larg1235

The A-Hmao (or Ahmao) language, also known as Large Flowery Miao (pinyin: Dà Huā Miáo), Hua Miao, or Northeast Yunnan (Chinese: 苗语滇东北方言; pinyin: Miáoyǔ Diàndōngběi fāngyán), is a Hmongic language spoken in China. It is the language for which the Pollard script was designed and displays extensive tone sandhi.

== Classification ==
A-Hmao is a branch of the West Hmongic languages, also known as Chuanqiandian Miao (Chinese: 川黔滇苗; lit. 'Sichuan–Guizhou–Yunnan Miao') and Western Miao. West Hmongic Languages are a major branch of the Hmongic languages of China and Southeast Asia.

Wang Fushi (1985) grouped the Western Miao languages into eight primary divisions:

1. Chuanqiandian Miao
2. Northeast Yunnan Miao (A-Hmao language)
3. Guiyang Miao
4. Huishui Miao
5. Mashan Miao
6. Luobohe Miao
7. Chong'anjiang Miao
8. Pingtang Miao

== Geographic distribution ==
A-Hmao is a language spoken in the northeast of Yunnan Province and in the west of Guizhou Province, particularly in Zhaotong, Kunming, Qujing, Chuxiong Yi autonomous prefecture, Weining Yi, Hui, and Miao autonomous county, Hezhang county, Liupanshui, and Ziyun Miao and Buyi autonomous county. There are 300,000 native speakers. The standard dialect is that of Shimenkan (石门坎), Weining County (威宁县).

== Phonology ==
=== Consonants ===
			Labial	Alveolar			Retroflex			Palatal	Velar	Uvular	Glottal
			Labial	plain	sibilant	lateral	plain	sibilant	lateral	Palatal	Velar	Uvular	Glottal
Plosive / Affricate	plain	plain	b /p/	d /t/	z /ts/	dl /tl̥/	dr /ʈ/	zh /ʈʂ/		j /tɕ/	g /k/	gh /q/	/ʔ/
Plosive / Affricate	plain	prenasal	nb /ᵐp/	nd /ⁿt/	nz /ⁿts/	ndl /ⁿtl̥/	ndr /ᶯʈ/	nzh /ᶯʈʂ/		nj /ⁿtɕ/	ng /ᵑk/	ngh /ᶰq/	
Plosive / Affricate	aspirated	plain	p /pʰ/	t /tʰ/	c /tsʰ/	tl /tl̥ʰ/	tr /ʈʰ/	ch /ʈʂʰ/		q /tɕʰ/	k /kʰ/	kh /qʰ/	
Plosive / Affricate	aspirated	prenasal	np /ᵐpʰ/	nt /ⁿtʰ/	nc /ⁿtsʰ/	ntl /ⁿtl̥ʰ/	ntr /ᶯʈʰ/	nch /ᶯʈʂʰ/		nq /ⁿtɕʰ/	nk /ᵑkʰ/	nkh /ᶰqʰ/	
Plosive / Affricate	voiced	plain	b /b/	d /d/	z /dz/	dl /dl/	dr /ɖ/	zh /ɖʐ/		j /dʑ/	g /ɡ/	gh /ɢ/	
Plosive / Affricate	voiced	prenasal	nb /ᵐb/	nd /ⁿd/	nz /ⁿdz/	ndl /ⁿdl/	ndr /ᶯɖ/	nzh /ᶯɖʐ/		nj /ⁿdʑ/	ng /ᵑɡ/	ngh /ᶰɢ/	
Fricative / Lateral		voiceless	f /f/		s /s/	hl /l̥/		sh /ʂ/	hlr /ɭ̊/	x /ɕ/	hx /x/	(h /χ/)	h /h/
Fricative / Lateral		voiced	v /v/		r /z/	l /l/		rh /ʐ/	lr /ɭ/	y /ʑ/	hy /ɣ/		
Nasal		voiced	m /m/	n /n/			nr /ɳ/			ni /n̠ʲ/	ngg /ŋ/		
Nasal		voiceless	hm /m̥/	hn /n̥/						hni /n̠̥ʲ/	hng /ŋ̊/		
Semivowel		voiced	w /w/										

Moreover, Gerner (2022) treats breathiness as a property of the onset, such as [lʱ] in the word lif [lʱi^{11}] 'two,' and reports a fricative aspirated lateral [ɬʰ], as in the word [ɬʰi^{11}] 'become.'

=== Vowels ===
		Front		Central	Back	
		unrounded	rounded	Central	unrounded	rounded
Close		i /i/	yu /y/		w /ɯ/	u /u/
Mid		e /e/		e /ə/		o /o/
Open					a /ɑ/	
Diphthong	rising	ai /ai̯/	eu /œy̯/		ang /ɑɯ̯/	ao /ɑu̯/
Diphthong	falling	ie /i̯e/			iw /i̯ɯ/ ia /i̯ɑ/	iu /i̯u/ io /i̯o/
Triphthong		iai /i̯ai̯/			iang /i̯ɑɯ̯/	iao /i̯ɑu̯/

=== Tones ===
Tone	Symbol	Value
1	b	˥˧ 54
2	x	˧˥ 35
3	d	˥ 55
4	l	˩ 11
5	t	˨ 33
6	s	˧˩ 31
7	k	˩ 11
8	f	˧˩ 31

The fourth, sixth, and eighth tones of A-Hmao, in the eastern region, are broken up partially or entirely into two categories based on the eight tones. At most, there can be up to eleven tones. Essentially, nouns and quantifiers are part of the first category, and they are higher in pitch. Other word classes are part of the second category, and they are lower in pitch.

A-Hmao language displays extensive tone sandhi. Similar to other branches of the West Hmongic languages, the tone sandhi happens on the second syllable when the first syllable of a disyllabic word is a level tone (first and second tone).

== Grammar ==
=== Morphology and vocabulary ===
The morphology of the three branches of the Hmong language are very similar. The following examples are from Central Miao. A-Hmao is similar to Hmong, which is an isolating language where most morphemes are monosyllables, resulting in verbs not being overtly inflected. Tense, aspect, mood, person, number, gender, and case are indicated lexically.

Single-morpheme word

1. Monosyllable single-morpheme word. (single-morpheme words are mostly monosyllable in Hmong language)
  Example:
  naxi 'human being'
  xed 'tiger'
  et 'tree'
  wil 'I'
  mongx 'you'
  nenx 'he'
  hsangb 'thousand'
  wangs 'ten thousand'
  bat 'hundred'
  lol 'come'
  mongl go; 'leave'
2. Multisyllable single-morpheme word. (There is a small number of multisyllable single-morpheme words in the Hmong language. Mostly, they are disyllabic, and there are very few with three or more syllables.)
  1. Alliterative. Example:
    gangt git 'hurry up; quickly'
    qut qat 'itchy'
    hcud hxangd 'nausea'
  2. Vowel rhyme. Example:
    Same tone:
    bal nial 'girl'
    box jox 'run'
    bux lux 'boiling'
    daib ghaib 'star'
    dent ent 'cloud'
    vongs nongs 'dirty'
    Different tones:
    hsab ngas 'clean'
    hsangd dangl 'in case'
    kak liax 'magpie'
  3. Non-alliterative and vowel rhyme. Example:
    ak wol 'crow'
    bil hsaid 'nearly; almost'
    ghob yenl 'chair'
  4. Reiterative syllable. Example:
    gid gid 'slowly'
    seix seix 'together'
    nangl nangl 'still'
    xangd xangd 'occasionally'

Compound word

1. Coordinating
  1. Noun morpheme compound with noun morpheme. Example:
    hveb hseid 'language'
    haxub khat 'relative'
    nangx bit 'name'
    niangx hniut 'age'
  2. Verb morpheme compound with verb morpheme. Example:
    cub nul 'rebuke'
    tid xongt 'construct'
    khab job 'lesson'
  3. Adjective morpheme compound with adjective morpheme. Example:
    ghongl jangl 'bend'
    khed hxat 'poverty'
2. Modifying
  1. Noun morpheme modifying noun morpheme. Example:
    det diangx 'candle'
    det diux 'key'
    eb mais 'tears'
    gad wangx 'corn'
  2. Adjective morpheme modifying noun morpheme. Example:
    bad yut 'uncle'
    mais lul 'aunt'
3. Dominating
  1. Verb morpheme dominating noun morpheme. Example:
    dlangd wangb 'dress up'
    qet ves 'rest'
  2. Adjective morpheme dominating noun morpheme. Example:
    dad hvib 'patience'
    hvent ves 'pleasantly cool'
    mais bil 'proficiency'
    mais ves 'tired'
4. Affixes
  Mostly are prefixes, and commonly used prefixes are ghab-, diub-, hangd-, gid-, jib-, daib-, bod-, xuk-, and so on. Ghab- is the most commonly used.
  1. Ghab- means human or animal body and part, plant part and things related to plants, natural objects, things related to buildings, utensils, and abstract objectives. Example:
    ghab jid 'body'
    ghab naix 'ear'
    ghab ghaib 'root'
    ghab nex 'leaf'
    ghab qangb 'living room'
    ghab sot 'kicken'
    ghab dliux 'soul'
    ghabnangs 'destiny'
  2. Diub- means location. Example:
    diub senx 'provincial capital'
    dioub ghaib on the street
    diub zaid at home
  3. Hangd-/khangd- means aspect and direction. Example:
    hangd nongx hangd nangl aspect of eating and wearing
    hangd nongd 'here'
    hangd momgx 'there'
    hangd deis 'where'
  4. Gid- means aspect and direction. Example:
    gid waix 'above'
    gid dab 'below'
    gid gux 'outside'
    gid niangs 'inside'
  5. Jib- means person. Example:
    jib daib 'child'
    jib hlangb 'grandchild'
    jib bad 'man'
  6. Daib- means person and some kinship terminology. Example:
    daib pik 'girl'
    daib jangs 'man, boy, husband'
    daib nenl 'uncle'
  7. Bod- means round object. Example:
    bod vib 'stone'
    bod ghof jus 'knee'
    bod liul 'fist'
  8. Xuk- means uncertain quantity.
    xuk laix 'a handful of'

==== Classifier inflections ====
One unusual feature of A-Hmao morphology is the existence of inflecting classifiers, i.e., classifiers that change form.

=== Syntax ===
As with other Hmongic languages, the basic word order of A-Hmao is subject-verb-object. Within the noun phrase, possessors precede possessed nouns, while relative clauses precede the nouns they modify. Noun phrases have the form (possessive) + (quantifier) + (classifier) + noun + (adjective) + (demonstrative). Question formation in Ahmao does not involve word order change: question words generally remain in situ, rather than appearing in sentence-initial position, and pseudo-clefting is also usually used in questions.

==== Overview ====
A-Hmao exhibits the grammatical patterns as in the table below.

Grammatical Relations by Element Order in A-Hmao
Relation Type	First Element	Second Element
Possessive	Possessor Noun	Possessed Noun
Restrictive adjectival	Adjective	Noun
Non-restrictive adjectival	Noun	Adjective
Nominalization	Relative clause	Noun
Adpositional	Preposition	Noun phrase
Predicational	Predicate	Arguments
Predicational	Adjunct	Predicate
Negation	Negative particle	Verb
TAM	Verb	Auxiliary
Subordination	Complementizer	Embedded clause

==== Question formation ====
Questions are typically formed with the wh- question word in situ, i.e., it appears where the corresponding noun would in the sentence, rather than appearing sentence-initially:

ʦɑ⁵⁵ndɑɯ³³ ɑ²¹n̥ɑɯ²¹ ntʂɿ⁵³ qɑ²¹ndy²²
TsaDaw yesterday met who
'Who did TsaDaw meet yesterday?'

== Writing system ==
At the beginning of the 20th century, missionary Samuel Pollard invented the Pollard script, which was based on the decorative symbols on their clothing. Before the introduction of the Pollard script, the A-Hmao people recorded their history through their ancient songs and weaved the history of their memories on their clothes, forming the history for A-Hmao. A Romanized orthography has also been developed for A-Hmao.

== Sources ==
- Chang, Melody Ya-Yin (2010). ""Sluicing" in Hmong (A-Hmao)". In Clemens, L.E.; Liu, C.-M. L. (eds.). Proceedings of the 22nd North American Conference on Chinese Linguistics (NACCL-22) & the 18th International Conference on Chinese Linguistics (IACL-18). Vol 2. Cambridge, MA: Harvard University. pp. 102–116.
- Gerner, Matthias (2019). Highlights from three Language Families in Southwest China. Duisburg, Germany: Research Foundation Language and Religion.
- Gerner, Matthias (2022). "Typologically rare properties of Miao languages". In Shei, Chris; Li, Saihong (eds.). The Routledge Handbook of Asian Linguistics. London: Routledge. pp. 47–71.
- Li, Jinping 李锦平 (2002). Miáozú yǔyán yǔ wénhuà 苗族语言与文化 [Miao Language and Culture]. Guìzhou minzu xueyuan xueshu.
- Liu, Yuanchao 刘援朝 (1993). "Wēiníng Miáoyǔ gǔ diào zhí gòunǐ" 威宁苗语古调值构拟. Zhōngyāng mínzú xuéyuàn xuébào 中央民族学院学报 (in Chinese). 1993 (3): 85–91. doi:10.15970/j.cnki.1005-8575.1993.03.019.
- Wang, Fushi 王辅世; Mao, Zongwu 毛宗武 (1995). Miáo-Yáoyǔ gǔyīn gòunǐ 苗瑶语古音构拟 (in Chinese). Zhongguo shehui kexue chubanshe.
