= Meng Sufen =

Chinese politician (1932–2020)

- 蒙素芬
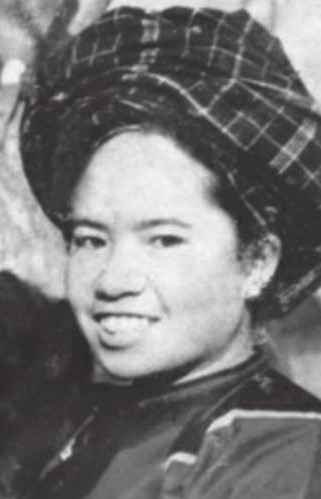
- Meng in Soviet Russia (1953)

Member of the Standing Committee of the 9th National Committee of the Chinese People's Political Consultative Conference
- In office January 1998 – January 2003

Vice Chairwoman of the Guizhou Provincial Political Consultative Conference
- In office November 1977 – January 1998

Director and Party Secretary of the Guizhou Provincial Women's Federation
- In office December 1973 – November 1977

Representative at the First, Second and Third National People's Congresses
- In office 1954–1975

Personal details
- Born: 25 October 1932 Zhenfeng County, Guizhou, Republic of China
- Died: 17 March 2020 (aged 87) Guiyang, Guizhou, China
- Party: Chinese Communist Party
- Children: 1 (daughter)

Meng Sufen
- Chinese: 蒙素芬
Transcriptions
Standard Mandarin
- Hanyu Pinyin: Mēng Sùfēn
- Wade–Giles: Meng1 Su4-fen1

Meng Sufen (Chinese: 蒙素芬; pinyin: Mēng Sùfēn; 25 October 1932 – 17 March 2020) was a Chinese politician. She served as a representative in the 1st, 2nd and 3rd National People's Congresses and held various leadership roles in the Guizhou Provincial Women's Federation and the Chinese People's Political Consultative Conference (CPPCC)

== Early life ==
Meng Sufen was born on 25 October 1932, into a Bouyei tenant farmer family in Zhema Village, Zhenfeng County in Guizhou Province. Growing up in poverty, she experienced the hardships of rural life, working in the fields from a young age to support her family after her father's death when she was 11.

== Political career ==
Following the capture of Zhenfeng County by the People's Liberation Army in December 1949, Meng joined the Chinese Communist Party’s land reform efforts. Her ability to connect with Bouyei villagers, fluency in the local language and mobilizing communities led to her recruitment into the land reform work team in December 1950. She served as a member of the land reform team in Zhenfeng County, district cadre, director of the Zhenfeng County Women’s Federation, and staff member of the Guizhou Provincial Women’s Federation. During this period, she studied at the Guizhou Provincial Communist Party School and the district government's civilian cadre school, learning Mandarin and developing her leadership skills.

In February 1952, Meng joined a delegation of ethnic miniorities from southwest China to visit Beijing, Tianjin, Shanghai, Hangzhou, Wuhan, and other cities. In Beijing, she was received by Chairman Mao Zedong and Premier Zhou Enlai. In July 1951, she was elected as a representative of Bouyei women to attend the People's Congress of Guizhou Province, where gave speech on grassroots work.

In 1953, she joined the Chinese Communist Party. In October of the same year, she was part of a Chinese women's delegation, led by Xu Guangping, to the Soviet Union to celebrate the 36th anniversary of the October Revolution. In Soviet Union, she spoke about the Chinese women's movement, earning admiration from Soviet attendees, including Lyubov Kosmodemyanskaya, mother of Soviet World War II war hero Zoya Kosmodemyanskaya. In 1955, she attended the 5th World Festival of Youth and Students in Warsaw, Poland, as part of a Chinese youth delegation.

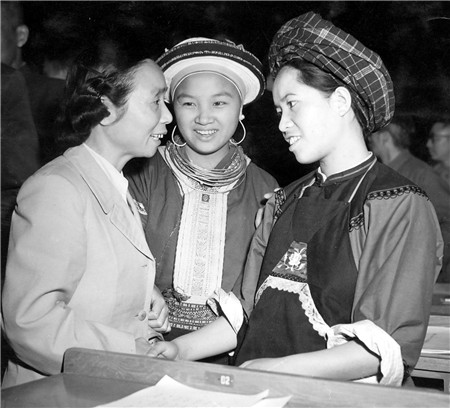
Meng (right) as a Bouyei delegate representing Guizhou conversing with Wu Zhizhen (center), a Miao delegate representing Guizhou and Wei Xiuying, delegate representing Jiangxi, at the 1st National People's Congress in Beijing (1954)

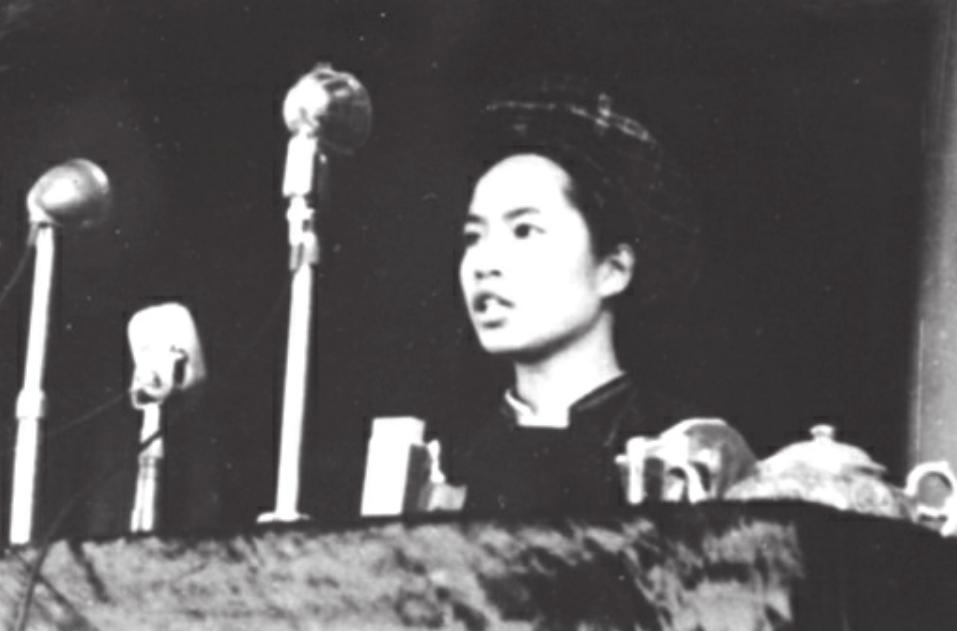
Meng speaking at the National People's Congress of Guizhou Province

In September 1954, Meng was elected as a delegate to the 1st National People's Congress in Beijing, where she voted for the adoption of the People's Republic of China’s first constitution. From September 1956 to November 1966, Meng served as deputy director of the Guizhou Provincial Women's Federation while pursuing further studies at the Guizhou Provincial Cadre Secondary Cultural School. In 1959, she briefly worked as a committee member in Changzhai District, Changshun County, and as a county-level minister in the Welfare Department. She was elected to the Ethnic Affairs Committee of the 2nd and 3rd National People's Congresses in 1959 and 1964, respectively. During the Cultural Revolution, she was assigned to labor work at the "May 7th" Cadre School. She later held positions such as head of the Mass Work Group in the Political Department of the Provincial Revolutionary Committee and head of the Preparatory Group of the Provincial Women’s Federation from November 1966 to December 1973.

From 1973 to 1977, Meng served as director and party secretary of the Guizhou Provincial Women’s Federation. From 1977 to 1983, she was vice chairperson of the Guizhou Provincial Chinese People's Political Consultative Conference (CPPCC), concurrently serving as deputy director and deputy party secretary of the provincial women’s federation. She continued as vice chairperson and party group member of the CPPCC from 1983 to 1993, and from 1993 to 1998, she was director of the Nationalities, Religions, Workers, Women, and Youth Committee of the provincial CPPCC.

In 1993, Meng led a significant investigation into poverty in the Mashan region of Guizhou, covering Huishui, Changshun, Luodian, Wangmo and Ziyun counties. Her team’s 280,000-word report and documentary, Mashan is Calling (Chinese: 麻山在呼唤; pinyin: Máshān zài hūhuàn), highlighted extreme poverty and spurred a province-wide donation campaign, raising over 1.6 million yuan for the region. This effort became a landmark in Guizhou’s poverty alleviation history. From 1998 to 2003, Meng served as a member of the Standing Committee of the 9th National Committee of the Chinese People's Political Consultative Conference, contributing to national policy through inspections, proposals, and grassroots engagement. She retired in December 2003.

Meng was known for her compassion and accessibility, earning the nickname "Mrs. Meng" among Bouyei communities. She supported initiatives like rural girls’ education, funding for disabled students and aided school renovations.

== Later life ==
Meng died on 17 March 2020, in Guiyang at age 87. Her obituary, published in Guizhou Daily, praised her as an outstanding Communist Party member who dedicated her life to socialism, women’s rights, and ethnic unity. General Secretary Xi Jinping and former General Secretary Hu Jintao expressed condolences on Meng's death.
