= West Hmongic languages =

Hmongic language branch of Asia

West Hmongic
- Chuanqiandian Miao
- Geographic distribution: China
- Linguistic classification: Hmong–Mien: Hmongic; Core Hmongic; West Hmongic
- Subdivisions: Hmong–Gha-Mu; A-Hmao; Bu–Nao; Gejia; Luobo; Mashan; Guiyang; Huishui; Pingtang

Language codes
- ISO 639-2 / 5: hmn
- ISO 639-3: hmn
- Glottolog: west2803

The West Hmongic languages, also known as Chuanqiandian Miao (Chinese: 川黔滇苗; lit. 'Sichuan–Guizhou–Yunnan Miao') and Western Miao, are a major branch of the Hmongic languages of China and Southeast Asia.

The name Chuanqiandian is used both for West Hmongic as a whole and for one of its branches, the Chuanqiandian cluster.

== Names ==
Autonyms include:

- Hmong /m̥oŋ43/ (Bijie and Wenshan Prefecture, Guizhou)
- Huishui Miao /m̥ʰoŋ24/ (Huishui County, Qiannan Prefecture, Guizhou)
- Mashan Miao /məŋ22/ (Ziyun County, Anshun, Guizhou)
- Luobo River Miao /a55 m̥jo31/ (Fuquan, Qiannan Prefecture, Guizhou)
- A-Hmao /a55 m̥au55/ (Weining County, Bijie, Guizhou; Zhaotong and Chuxiong Prefecture, Yunnan)

== Classification ==
West Hmongic is the most diverse branch of the Hmong (Miao) language family. There are nine primary branches in Chinese sources, though the unity of these are not accepted in all Western sources.

- Chuanqiandian cluster
  - Hmong^{‡}
  - Gha-Mu (Small Flowery Miao)
  - Xixiu Miao
- Chong'an River Miao
  - Gejia
  - Dongjia
- Bu–Nao^{‡}
- A-Hmao (Big Flowery Miao, Northeast Yunnan Miao)
- A-Hmyo (Luobohe Miao)
- Guiyang Miao^{‡}
- Huishui Miao^{‡}
- Mashan Miao (Mang, Hmang)^{‡}
- Pingtang Miao^{‡}

Items marked ^{‡} have been split into individual languages (and not kept together) by either Matisoff or Strecker; all of these are branches of Miao listed with subbranches in Chinese sources. The other three (A-Hmao, A-Hmyo, Gejia) are not so divided in either Chinese or Western sources. The three divisions of the Chuanqiandian cluster are only as divergent as the divisions of the other branches marked ^{‡}, but are listed separately due to the internal complexity of Hmong.

The various varieties of Pingtang, new branches of Guiyang and Mashan, and Matisoff's Raojia and Pa Na are not listed in Ethnologue 16 and have no ISO codes. Matisoff (2006) gives very different names, and it's not clear how these correspond to the branches listed here.

=== Wang (1983) ===
Wang Fushi, summarized in English by David Strecker, emphasized the diversity of Western Hmongic. The names below are from Strecker; Wang did not assign names, but identified the districts where the varieties were spoken.

Chuanqiandian (Sichuan–Guizhou–Yunnan)

- Chuanqiandian subgroup
  - Hmong (Chuanqiandian cluster: White Hmong, Green Mong, etc.)
  - Small Flowery Miao
  - Xixiu Miao
- Northeastern Yunnan (A-Hmau, Large Flowery Miao)
- Guiyang (Hmong)
- Huishui (Mhong)
- Mashan (Mang)
- Luobo River (A-Hmyo)
- Eastern or Zhong'an River (Mhong, Gedou)
- ? Pingtang
- ? Qianxi–Pingba–Qingzhen–Liuzhi (= Li Yunbing's Qianxi)
- ? Luodian Muyin (Moyin)
- ? Dushan
- ? Luodian Pingyan
- ? Ziyun–Zhenning (= Li Yunbing's Ziyun)
- ? Wangmo
- ? Wangmo–Luodian (Mhang)
- Pu–Nao (= Bu–Nao)
  - Pu Nu [Tung Nu] (= Bunu, Dongnu)
  - Nu Nu
  - Pu No (= Bunuo)
  - Nao Klao (= Baonao)
  - Nu Mhou (= Numao)

These are not all established as unitary branches, however. In a follow-up, Strecker broke up Bu–Nao on the basis of newly accessible data, and noted that several of the languages listed by Wang (marked "?" above) were unclassified due to lack of data and had not been demonstrated to be West Hmongic. The other groups are then listed as unclassified within Hmongic, and not specifically West Hmongic. However, Wang (1994) identified two as varieties of Guiyang. The eight unclassified languages are all spoken in a small area of south-central Guizhou, along with Guiyang, Huishui, Mashan, and Luobo River Miao. These were later addressed by Li Yunbing (2000).

=== Wang (1985) ===
Wang Fushi later grouped the Western Miao languages into eight primary divisions. Datapoint locations of representative dialects are from Li Yunbing (2000:237), all of which are located in Guizhou province, China.

- Chuanqiandian Miao
  - Lect 1 (1,100,000 speakers; representative dialect: Dananshan 大南山寨, Xiaoshao township 小哨苗族乡, Bijie city)
    The Tuhe 土河 dialect is spoken in Xishui County, Guizhou.
  - Lect 2 (70,000+ speakers; representative dialect: Xingfa township 兴发乡, Hezhang County)
  - Lect 3 (representative dialect: Zhuchang township 猪场乡, Zhijin County)
- Northeast Yunnan Miao (250,000 speakers; representative dialect: Shimenkan 石门坎寨, Zhongshui district 中水区, Weining County)
- Guiyang Miao
  - Northern (80,000 speakers; representative dialect: Baituo 摆托寨, Qingyan township 青岩乡, Huaxi District 花溪区, Guiyang city)
  - Southwestern (65,000 speakers; representative dialect: Kaisa village 凯洒村, Machang township 马场乡, Pingba County)
  - Southern (25,000 speakers; representative dialect: Wangjiashan 汪家山, Huayan township 华严乡, Anshun city)
  - Northwestern (7,000 speakers; representative dialect: Tieshi township 铁石苗族彝族乡, Qianxi County)
  - Central (5,000 speakers; representative dialect: South-central Guiyang Miao, Hongyanzhai 红岩寨, Baiyun township 白云乡, Ziyun County)
- Huishui Miao
  - Northern (64,000 speakers; representative dialect: Jiading 甲定寨, Gaopo township 高坡苗族乡, Guiyang city)
  - Western (52,000 speakers; representative dialect: Yarong Township 鸭绒乡, Huishui County)
  - Central (41,000 speakers; representative dialect: Baijin township 摆金乡, Huishui County)
  - Eastern (13,000 speakers; representative dialect: Xiguan township 西关乡, Pingtang County)
- Mashan Miao
  - Central (60,000 speakers; representative dialect: Jiaotuo 绞坨寨, Zongdi township 宗地乡, Ziyun County)
  - Northern (30,000 speakers; representative dialect: Baisuo township 摆梭乡, Changshun County)
  - Western (12,000 speakers; representative dialect: Sidazhai 四大寨, Houchang Township 猴场乡, Ziyun County)
  - Southern (9,000 speakers; representative dialect: Youquan village 油全村, Lekuan township 乐宽乡, Wangmo County)
  - Southwestern (5,000 speakers; representative dialect: Babangzhai 岜棒寨, Dalang township 打狼乡, Ziyun County)
  - Southeastern (6,000 speakers; representative dialect: Babazhai 把坝寨, Moyin 模引乡, Wangmo County)
- Luobohe Miao (43,000 speakers; representative dialect: Yejipo 野鸡坡寨, Ganba township 甘坝乡, Fuquan County)
- Chong'anjiang Miao (44,000 speakers; representative dialect: Fengxiang 枫香寨, Chong'an township 重安乡, Huangping County)
- Pingtang Miao
  - Northern (15,000 speakers; representative dialect: Shanglin village 上林村, Yuanjiatong township 原甲桐乡, Pingtang County)
  - Eastern (5,000 speakers; representative dialect: Caozhai 草寨, Xinmin township 新民乡, Dushan County)
  - Southern (7,000 speakers; representative dialect: Pingyan 平岩乡, Luodian County)
  - Western (3,500 speakers; representative dialect: Youmai village 油迈村, Youmai township 油迈乡, Wangmo County)

The above classification was later revised by Li Jinping & Li Tianyi (2012:285) to include 7 dialects instead of the 8 given by Wang; Pingtang Miao is excluded.

- Western Miao (representative dialect: Dananshan, Yanzikou, Bijie 贵州毕节燕子口镇大南山)
  - Chuanqiandian Miao (representative dialect: Damiaozhai, Jichang, Bijie 贵州毕节吉场大苗寨)
    - Lect 1
    - Lect 2
  - Guiyang Miao (representative dialect: Guankou, Machang, Pingba 贵州平坝马场关口)
    - Northern
    - Western
    - Southern
  - Huishui Miao (representative dialect: Jiading, Gaopo, Huaxi, Guiyang 贵州贵阳花溪高坡甲定)
    - Northern
    - Western
    - Central
    - Eastern
  - Mashan Miao (representative dialect: Dalong, Dayun, Ziyun 贵州紫云大云大龙)
    - Central
    - Northern
    - Western
    - Southern
  - Northeast Yunnan Miao (representative dialect: Shimenkan, Weining 贵州威宁石门砍)
  - Luobohe Miao (representative dialect: Yejipo, Xinqiao, Fuquan 贵州福泉新桥野鸡坡)
  - Chong'anjiang Miao (representative dialect: Fengxiang, Chongxing, Huangping 贵州黄平重兴枫香)

=== Li (2000) ===
Li Yunbing classified those varieties left unclassified by Wang, grouping four of them together as an eighth branch of West Hmongic, Pingtang. He identified Luodian Muyin and Wangmo (using Strecker's names) as varieties of Mashan. Wang (1994) had already established Qianxi and Ziyun as varieties of Guiyang. This classification is repeated in Wu and Yang (2010):

- Chuanqiandian cluster (川黔滇 Chuānqiándiān)
- A-Hmao (滇东北 Diāndōngběi)
- Guiyang Miao (贵阳 Guìyáng)
- Huishui Miao (惠水 Huìshuǐ)
- Mashan Miao (麻山 Máshān)
- A-Hmyo (罗泊河 Luóbóhé)
- Gejia (重安江 Chóng'ānjiāng)
- Pingtang Miao (平塘 Píngtáng)

The varieties analyzed by Li Yunbing (2000) are:

- Guiyang Miao
  - /m̥uŋ44/ (also called Jiucai Miao 韭菜苗) in Hongyan, Baiyun township, Ziyun County 紫云县白云乡红岩寨; 4,000 speaker
  - /tə33 m̥ju44/ in Tieshi township, Qianxi County 黔西县铁石苗族彝族乡
- Pingtang Miao
  - /kei55 m̥ho24/ in Jiatong township, Pingtang County 平塘县甲桐乡 (currently Kaluo 卡罗乡); 11,000 speakers
  - /to22 m̥o35/ in Xinmin township, Dushan County 独山县新民乡; 4,000+ speakers
  - /tõ24 m̥ɒ24/ (also called Red Miao 红苗) in Pingyan, Luodian County 罗甸县平岩乡; 6,000 speakers
  - /m̥aŋ55/ in Youmai, Wangmo County 望谟县油迈乡; 3,000 speakers
- Mashan Miao
  - /toŋ35 m̥aŋ35/ (also called Cotton Miao 棉花苗; Bouyei: /ʑəu21 vɦi21/) in Dalang, Ziyun County 紫云县打狼乡; 4,000 speakers
  - /toŋ33 m̥aŋ33/ in Moyin, Luodian County 罗甸县模引乡; 4,000+ speakers

Li (2000) considers Raojia (/qɑ24 ʑuɤ24/) of Heba 河坝, Majiang County, to be a separate dialect of Hmu (East Hmongic). It has 5,000 speakers in Majiang County, and 10,000 speakers total.

Bu–Nao was not included because the speakers are classified by the Chinese government as ethnically Yao rather than Miao.

=== Matisoff (2001) ===
James Matisoff outlined the following in 2001. Not all languages are necessarily listed.

Western Hmong

- Libo Miao (= ?, maybe Bu–Nao)
- Weining Miao (= A-Hmao / Large Flowery Miao?)
- Guangshun Miao (Yi Miao) (= ?)
- Sichuan–Guizhou–Yunnan (= Chuanqiandian cluster)
  - Petchabun (White Hmong)
  - Green Hmong (Blue Hmong)
  - Suyong Miao (Magpie Miao)
  - Chuan Miao (Western Sichuan Miao)
  - Huajie Miao (= ?)

=== Mortensen (2004) ===
David Mortensen argues for the following classification of Western Hmongic based on shared tonal innovations, including tone sandhi. Pingtang, Luobohe, and Chong'anjiang are not addressed.

- Western Hmongic
  - Guiyang-Huishui
    - Guiyang
      - Baituo 摆托 (in Qingyan 青岩镇, Huaxi District)
      - Tieshi 铁石
      - Zhongba 中坝
    - Huishui
      - Jiading 甲定
  - Core Western Hmongic
    - Mashan
      - Jiaotuo 绞坨 (in Zongdi 宗地乡, Ziyun County), Shuijingping 水井坪
      - Xinzhai 新寨
    - Far Western Hmongic
      - A-Hmao (Diandongbei)
        - Western
        - Eastern
      - Hmong (Chuanqiandian)

=== Ratliff (2010) ===
Martha Ratliff includes three languages specifically:

- Hmong (Chuanqiandian in the narrow sense)
- A-Hmao (Big Flowery Miao)
- Bunu

The last contradicts Matisoff (2001), who had posited a Bunu branch of Hmongic with Bu–Nao in it, but recapitulates Strecker (1987). The other Western varieties are not addressed, though some are included in her reconstruction of Proto-Hmong–Mien.

=== Castro & Gu (2010): Wenshan ===
Andy Castro and Gu Chawen divide the Hmong dialects of Wenshan Prefecture, Yunnan, into four subdivisions, listed from east to west.

- Hmongb Shuat (偏苗, 'Lopsided Miao'; most divergent)
- Hmongb Dleub (白苗, Bái Miáo, 'White Miao')
- Shib-Nzhuab (青苗, 'Green Miao')
  - Hmongb Shib
  - Mongb Nzhuab
- Soud-Bes-Buak (花苗, 'Flowery Miao')
  - Hmongb Soud
  - Hmongb Bes
  - Hmong Buak

The dialects given above are named after the groups they are spoken by.

=== Castro, Flaming & Luo (2012): Honghe ===
Castro, Flaming & Luo (2012) found that there are 4 different West Hmongic languages in Honghe Prefecture, Yunnan.

- Northern Hua Miao
- Southern Hua Miao
- White Miao
- Sinicised Miao

Castro, Flaming & Luo (2012) propose the following classification for the Western Miao dialects of southeastern Yunnan, which is based on Michael Johnson's 1998 classification of Western Miao dialects.

- Western Miao [Hmong]
  - Sinicised Miao
    - Sat (汉苗)
    - Shuat (偏苗、汉苗)
  - Farwestern Miao
    - White Miao
      - Dleub (白苗)
    - Northern Hua Miao
      - Standard Western Miao
      - Bes (花苗)
      - Soud (花苗)
      - Ndrous (花苗)
      - Black Miao
        - Dlob (黑苗)
        - Buak (黑苗)
    - Southern Hua Miao
      - Shib (青苗)
      - Lens (花苗、红头苗)
      - Nzhuab (绿苗、花苗)
      - Dlex Nchab (清水苗)

== Writing ==
The Miao languages were traditionally written with various adaptations of Chinese characters. Around 1905, Sam Pollard introduced a Romanized script for the A-Hmao language, and this came to be used for Hmong Daw (Chuanqiandian) as well. In the United States, the Romanized Popular Alphabet is often used for White and Green Hmong (also Chuanqiandian).

In China, pinyin-based Latin alphabets have been devised for Chuanqiandian—specifically the variety of Dananshan (大南山), Yanzikou Town (燕子口镇), Bijie—and A-Hmao. Wu and Yang (2010) report attempts at writing Mashan in 1985 and an improvement by them; they recommend that standards should be developed for each of the six other primary varieties of West Hmongic.
