= Pingtang Miao language =

Hmong language of Guizhou, China

Pingtang Miao
- Native to: China
- Region: Guizhou
- Native speakers: (24,000 cited 1995)
- Language family: Hmong–Mien: Hmongic; West Hmongic; Pingtang Miao

Language codes
- ISO 639-3: None (mis)
- Linguist List: ping Pingtang
- dush Dushan
- lupi Luodian–Pingyan
- wanl Wangmo–Luodian
- Glottolog: None

Pingtang Miao, named after Pingtang County (平塘 Píngtáng) in which it is spoken, is a group of Miao language varieties of China.

== Classification ==
The four varieties of Pingtang were listed as unclassified branches of Chuanqiandian Miao (Western Hmongic) in Wang (1983). Li (2000) classified them together as one of eight branches of Western Hmongic, a position maintained in Wu and Yang (2010).

== Varieties ==
According to Li, there are four varieties of Pingtang (2000):

- North (Strecker's Pingtang Miao), 11,000 speakers
- East (Strecker's Dushan Miao), 4,000 speakers
- South (Strecker's Luodian Pingyan Miao), 6,000 speakers
- West (Strecker's Wangmo–Luodian Miao a.k.a. Mhang), 3,000 speakers

These are at approximately the distance of the varieties of the other branches of West Hmongic, which Ethnologue assigned separate ISO codes.

== Demographics ==
Below is a list of Miao dialects and their respective speaker populations and distributions from Li (2018), along with representative datapoints from Wang (1985).

Dialect	Speakers	Counties	Representative datapoint (Wang 1985)
North	10,000+	Pingtang	Shanglin village 上林村, Yuanjiatong Township 原甲桐乡, Pingtang County
East	4,000	Dushan	Caozhai 草寨, Xinmin Township 新民乡, Dushan County
South	6,000	Luodian, Pingtang, Nandan	Pingyan Township 平岩乡, Luodian County
West	3,000	Wangmo	Youmai Village 油迈村, Youmai Township 油迈乡, Wangmo County
