= Gha-Mu =

Gha-Mu may refer to:

- Gha-Mu people, Small Flowery Miao or Blue Hmong, an ethnic group from Guizhou, China
- Gha-Mu language or Small Flowery Miao, a Miao language of China
