= Huishui Miao language =

Miao language of Guizhou, China

Huishui Miao
- Mhong
- Native to: China
- Region: Guizhou
- Native speakers: (180,000 cited 1995)
- Language family: Hmong–Mien: Hmongic; West Hmongic; Huishui Miao

Language codes
- ISO 639-3: Variously: hmc – Central hme – Eastern hmi – Northern hmh – Southwestern
- Glottolog: huis1239

Huishui Miao, a.k.a. Huishui Hmong, is a Miao language of China. It is named after Huishui County, Guizhou, though not all varieties are spoken there. The endonym is Mhong, though it shares this with Gejia and it is simply a variant spelling of Hmong.

Huishui was given as a subgroup of Western Hmongic in Strecker (1987). Matisoff (2001) split it into four separate languages, and, conservatively, did not retain it as a group.

== Demographics ==
Below is a list of Miao dialects and their respective speaker populations and distributions from Li (2018), along with representative datapoints from Wang (1985).

Dialect	Speakers	Counties	Representative datapoint (Wang 1985)
North	60,000	Guiyang (including in Huaxi Gaopo 花溪区高坡乡), Longli, Guiding, Huishui	Jiading 甲定寨, Gaopo Township 高坡苗族乡, Guiyang City
Central	40,000+	Huishui, Changshun	Baijin Township 摆金乡, Huishui County
East	10,000+	Huishui, Pingtang	Xiguan Township 西关乡, Pingtang County
West	50,000	Huishui, Changshun	Yarong Township 鸭绒乡, Huishui County

According to Sun (2017), the northern dialect of Huishui Miao is spoken in the following townships by a total of approximately 50,000 speakers.

- Guiyang City: Gaopo 高坡
- Huishui County: Yangchang 羊场
- Guiding County: Tangbao 塘堡, Pingfa 平伐, etc.
