= Guiyang Miao language =

Miao language of Guizhou, China

Guiyang Miao
- Hmong
- Native to: China
- Region: Guizhou
- Native speakers: (190,000 cited 1995)
- Language family: Hmong–Mien: Hmongic; West Hmongic; Guiyang Miao
- Dialects: Mo Piu?

Language codes
- ISO 639-3: Variously: huj – Northern hmy – Southern hmg – Southwestern
- Glottolog: guiy1235

Guiyang Miao, also known as Guiyang Hmong, is a Miao language of China. It is named after Guiyang, Guizhou, though not all varieties are spoken there. The endonym is Hmong, a name it shares with the Hmong language.

== Classification ==
Guiyang was given as a subgroup of Western Hmongic in Wang (1985). Matisoff (2001) separated the three varieties as distinct Miao languages, not forming a group. Wang (1994) adds another two minor, previously unclassified varieties.

- Northern
- Southern
- Southwestern
- Northwestern (Qianxi 黔西)
- South-Central (Ziyun 紫云)

Mo Piu, spoken in northern Vietnam, may be a divergent variety of Guiyang Miao.

Representative dialects of Guiyang Miao include:

- Baituo 摆托, Huaxi District, Guiyang
- Tieshi 铁石, Qianxi County
- Zhongba 中坝, Changshun County

== Demographics ==
Below is a list of Miao dialects and their respective speaker populations and distributions from Li (2018), along with representative datapoints from Wang (1985).

Dialect	Speakers	Counties	Representative datapoint (Wang 1985)
North	70,000	Guiyang (in Huaxi, Xiaohe, Baiyun, Wudang districts), Qingzhen, Kaiyang, Xifeng, Xiuwen, Anshun, Pingba, Zhenning, Qianxi, Jinsha, Zhijin, Longli, Guiding	Baituo 摆托寨, Qingyan Township 青岩乡, Huaxi District 花溪区, Guiyang City
South	20,000+	Anshun, Zhenning	Wangjiashan 汪家山, Huayan Township 华严乡, Anshun City
Southwest	60,000	Guiyang (in Huaxi, Wudang, Baiyun districts), Qingzhen, Anshun, Pingba, Ziyun, Changshun	Kaisa Village 凯洒村, Machang Township 马场乡, Pingba County
Northwest	6,000	Qingzhen, Qianxi, Longlin	Tieshi Township 铁石苗族彝族乡, Qianxi County
South-Central	6,000	Ziyun, Zhenning	Hongyanzhai 红岩寨, Baiyun Township 白云乡, Ziyun County

According to Sun (2017), the northern dialect of Guiyang Miao is spoken in the following locations by a total of approximately 60,000 speakers.

- Pingba County: Linka 林卡
- Qianxi County: Chongxin 重新, Shiping 石平
- Jinsha County: Musha 木沙, Bijia 笔架, Zongping 宗平, Dayuan 大员, Xinxi 新西, Anmin 安民, Taoyuan 桃园
- Zhenning County: Xinchang 新场
- Kaiyang, Xifeng, Xiuwen, Guiding, and other counties
