= Xixiu Miao language =

Miao language of Guizhou, China

Xixiu Miao
- Native to: China
- Region: Guizhou
- Native speakers: (300 cited 1995)
- Language family: Hmong–Mien: Hmongic; West Hmongic; Chuanqiandian Cluster; Xixiu Miao

Language codes
- ISO 639-3: None (mis)
- Glottolog: None

Xixiu Miao (Chinese: 西秀苗语) is a small Miao language of China that is closely related to Hmong: Hmong, Small Flowery Miao, and Xixiu are listed as the three local dialects of the Chuanqiandian Cluster of the West Hmongic languages. There are only 300 speakers, in the Xixiu District of Anshun Prefecture, Guizhou Province.
