= Mo Piu language =

Hmongic language of Vietnam

Mo Piu
- Mơ Piu
- Native to: Vietnam
- Region: Lào Cai Province
- Native speakers: 240 (2011)
- Language family: Hmong–Mien: Hmongic; West Hmongic?; Guiyang Miao?; Mo Piu

Language codes
- ISO 639-3: None (mis)
- Glottolog: None

Mo Piu (Mơ Piu) is an unclassified Hmongic language spoken in the village of Nậm Tu Thượng, Nậm Xé Township, western Văn Bàn District, Lào Cai Province. It was first documented in 2009 by a team of French linguists as part of the MICA Institute's "Au Co" Project.

Geneviève Caelen-Haumont reported 237 speakers as of 2011. She notes that Mo Piu is highly divergent from neighbouring Hmongic languages in Vietnam.

Ly Van Tu & Vittrant (2014) tentatively classify Mo Piu as a Guiyang Miao dialect.
