= Dongjia language =

Hmongic language of Guizhou, China

Dongjia
- Gameng
- 东家话
- Native to: China
- Region: Guizhou
- Ethnicity: She
- Language family: Hmong–Mien: Hmongic; West Hmongic; ? Chuanqiandian cluster; Dongjia

Language codes
- ISO 639-3: –

The Dongjia language (Chinese: 东家话) is a West Hmongic language of Guizhou, China. It is most closely related to Gejia.

The Dongjia people are officially classified as She, but speak a West Hmongic language. Their autonym is Gameng (嘎孟), while the neighboring Raojia people call them Gadou (嘎斗). The Dongjia people of Liubao (六堡村), Xingshan Township (杏山镇), Majiang County was studied by Dong (2008). Chen (2011) considers Gejia and Dongjia to be two different varieties of Chong'anjiang Miao (重安江苗语), and places Chong'anjiang Miao within the Chuanqiandian (川黔滇) branch.
