= Chuanqiandian Miao language =

Chuanqiandian may be:

- One of the Chuanqiangdian Miao languages (Western Hmongic)
- First Chuanqiandian Miao (Hmong)
