= Mashan Miao language =

Miao language of Guizhou, China

Mang
- Mashan Miao
- Pronunciation: mʱaŋ˨
- Native to: China
- Region: Guizhou
- Native speakers: (140,000 cited 1995)
- Language family: Hmong–Mien: Hmongic; West Hmongic; Mang

Language codes
- ISO 639-3: Variously: hmm – Central hmp – Northern hma – Southern hmw – Western
- Glottolog: mash1238

Mang, or Mashan Miao also known as Mashan Hmong (麻山 máshān), is a Miao language of China, spoken primarily in Ziyun Miao and Buyei Autonomous County, southwestern Guizhou province, southwest China. The endonym is Mang, similar to other West Hmongic languages such as Mong.

== Varieties ==
Mang was classified as a branch of Western Hmongic in Wang (1985), who listed four varieties. Matisoff (2001) gave these four varieties the status of separate languages, and, conservatively, did not retain them as a single group within West Hmongic. Li Yunbing (2000) added two minor varieties which had been left unclassified in Wang, Southeastern (Strecker's "Luodian Muyin") and Southwestern ("Wangmo").

- Central Mang: 70,000 speakers
- Northern Mang: 35,000
- Western Mang: 14,000
- Southern Mang: 10,000
- Southeastern Mang: 4,000
- Southwestern Mang: 4,000

== Demographics ==
Below is a list of Miao dialects and their respective speaker populations and distributions from Li (2018), along with representative datapoints from Wang (1985).

Dialect	Speakers	Counties	Representative datapoint (Wang 1985)
North	30,000	Changshun, Huishui, Luodian	Baisuo Township 摆梭乡, Changshun County
South	8,000	Wangmo	Youquan village 油全村, Lekuan Township 乐宽乡, Wangmo County
Central	50,000+	Ziyun, Wangmo, Luodian	Jiaotuo 绞坨寨, Zongdi Township 宗地乡, Ziyun County
West	10,000+	Ziyun	Sidazhai 四大寨, Houchang Township 猴场乡, Ziyun County
Southeast	5,000	Luodian	Babazhai 把坝寨, Moyin Township 模引乡, Wangmo County
Southwest	4,000+	Wangmo, Luodian	Babangzhai 岜棒寨, Dalang Township 打狼乡, Ziyun County

According to Sun (2017), the central dialect of Mashan Miao is spoken in the following locations by a total of approximately 50,000 speakers.

- Ziyun County: Zongdi 宗地, Dayi 打易, Gejing 格井, Kehun 克混, Meichang 妹场, Baihua 百花
- Luodian County: Fengting 逢亭, Bianyang 边阳, etc.

== Phonology and script ==
A pinyin alphabet had been created for Mang in 1985, but proved to have deficiencies. Wu and Yang (2010) report the creation of a new alphabet, albeit a tentative one, based on the Central Mang dialect of Ziyun County, Zōngdì 宗地 township, Dàdìbà 大地坝 village. (Note: Several consonants were added to the 1985 alphabet, while bz, pz, nbz, mz and gh were removed.)

Consonants, in pinyin, are:

labial: b p nb np, m f v, by py nby my, bl pl nbl npl ml
lateral: l lj
dental or alveolar stops: d t dl dj nd nt n
dental affricates: z c s nz nc
retroflex: dr tr ndr nr sh r
alveolo-palatal: j q nj x y ny
velar or uvular: g k ngg ng, h w hw
(zero onset)

The Latin voiced/voiceless opposition has been coopted to indicate aspiration, as usual in pinyin alphabets.

Correspondences between Central Mang dialects include Dadiba retroflex dr, tr with dental z, c in another village of the same Zongdi township, Sanjiao (三脚 Sānjiǎo). The other five varieties of Mang have more palatalized initials than Central Mang, though these can be transcribed as medial -i-. The onsets by, py, nby, my are pronounced [pʐ pʰʐ mpʐ mʐ ] in Central Mang and [pj pʰj mpj mj] in the other five Mang varieties.

Vowels and finals, including those needed for Chinese loans, are:

a aa [ã] ai ao ain ang
e ea ei en ein eu ew eng
i iou in ie iu iao ian iang
o ou ow ong
u uw ua ui ue un uai uan uang
yu

Most Central Mang and Western Mang dialects have eleven to thirteen tones. Compared to the eight tone categories of other Western Hmongic languages, the odd-numbered tones are each split into two. The tones of at least three villages of Central Mang have been documented: Dadiba (Wu & Yang 2010), Jiaotuozhai (Wang & Mao 1995; Li 2000), and Jingshuiping (Xian 1990; Mortensen 2006, all in the Zongdi township of Ziyun County. They lie several kilometers apart and have minor differences.

Central Mang tone
		Dadiba	Jingshuiping	Jiaotuozhai
1a	-b	˦˨ 42	˧ 3	˧˨ 32
1b	-p	˨ 2		
2	-x	˥ 5	˦˨ 42	˥˧ 53
3a	-d	˥˧ 53		˦˨ 42
3b	-z	˨˧˨ 232		
4	-l	˩ 1		
5a	-t	˥ 55		
5b	-c	˨˦ 24		˧˥ 35
6	-s	˩˧ 13		
6'	-p	˨ 2		˧ 3
7a	-k	˧ 3	˦ 4	
7b	-s	˩˧ 13		
8	-f	˨˩ 21		

Although some pairs of tones (such as tones 6 and 7b) have the same value when pronounced alone, they behave differently with regard to tone sandhi and should be treated as different phonologically. Tones also interact with phonation types and vowel quality. Jiaotuozhai tones 4 and 6 are breathy voiced and have higher vowels.

== Syntax ==
=== Constituent Order ===
The basic constituent order in Mang clauses is subject-verb-object.^{[a]} In the following example from Southern Mashan, god mat 'my mother' is the subject, jaud 'boil' is the verb, and haet 'egg' is the object:

god mat jaud haet
1SG mother boil egg
'My mum boiled (some) eggs.'

In sentences with a single argument, this single argument most often appears before the verb:

god xef lex
1SG wake.up ASP
'I got up.'

Mang has an existential construction using the verb nyab 'have', where the subject is introduced after the verb:

xix_eid nyab ib lenx box_lol_renh
before have one CLF witch
'Once upon a time there was a witch.'

=== Prepositional Phrases ===
Prepositional phrases usually appear between the subject and the verb. In the following example, the preposition ndeus 'with' appears:^{[b]}

god ndeus nil nyax lex.
1SG with 3SG eat PERF
'I ate (it) with him.'

Another example with nyab 'at':

god mat nyab biaed angt_hangb
1SG mother at house work
'My mother works at home.'

=== Topicalization ===
Topicalization is achieved by placing content on the left side of the main clause, separated from the clause by a pause or by the particle jek:

beid jek zit qengl njab qengl.
fruit PRT spill.fall.out all.completely spill.fall.out all.completely
'As for the pears, (they) spilled out everywhere.'

=== Aspect ===
Aspect in Mang is expressed through markers separate from the verb, and include perfective/inchoative lex, progressive ndaex, experiential hliah, and completive jinx.

=== Negation ===
Negation takes the form of a negative marker preceding the verb, mux in Southern Mashan and muh in Central:

god mux ngil loul
1SG NEG down.off DIR
'I'm not coming down.'

Mang also has a "non-completion" negative marker akin to Mandarin Chinese 没有 méiyǒu with the same syntax. It takes the form mux neis in Southern Mashan and muh nans in Central. An example from the Central variety:

gongd muh_nans nongh ngex heb, gongd noax ngex nggongx
1SG NEG eat meat chicken 1SG eat meat cow
'I didn't eat chicken, I ate beef.'

== Notes ==
^{a} The primary source on Mang grammar is Heal (2020), which is cast in Role and reference grammar. The discussion here converts specialized terminology into their more conventional counterparts.

^{b} Heal's (2020) analysis here for Mang ndeus 'with' as a "deverbal preposition" differs slightly from Jarkey's (2015) analysis for the Hmong cognate nrog 'be with' as a verb in a serial verb construction.
