= Hemiphyllodactylus huishuiensis =

Scientific classification
- Kingdom: Animalia
- Phylum: Chordata
- Class: Reptilia
- Order: Squamata
- Suborder: Gekkota
- Family: Gekkonidae
- Genus: Hemiphyllodactylus
- Species: H. huishuiensis

Binomial name
- Hemiphyllodactylus huishuiensis Yan, Lin, Guo, Li, & Zhou, 2016

Species of lizard

Hemiphyllodactylus huishuiensis is a species of gecko. It is endemic to Guizhou, China and first described in Huishui County. It has also been found in Ziyun County.
