= HMW =

HMW may refer to:

- Hampton Wick railway station, in London
- Handbook of the Mammals of the World
- Homewood (Amtrak station), in Illinois, United States
- Western Mashan Miao language, spoken in China
