= A-Hmao =

Hmongic ethnic group in China

A-Hmao, also known as Big Flowery Miao (Chinese: 大花苗), are a Hmongic ethnic group in China. They are from Yunnan and Sichuan and also live in Guizhou. The number of persons within this group likely exceeds 400,000. They are speakers of the A-Hmao language, which belongs to the Hmong family.

== Sources ==
- Lewis, M. Paul, ed. (2009), Ethnologue: Languages of the World (16th ed.), Dallas, TX: SIL International

== See also ==
- Gha-Mu
