= Ge language =

Ge may be:

- One of the Jê languages of Brazil
- The Gejia language of China
