= Luobohe Miao language =

Hmongic language spoken in Guizhou, China

Luobo River Miao
- A-Hmyo, Ā-hmiò
- Native to: China
- Region: central Guizhou
- Native speakers: (61,000 cited 1995)
- Language family: Hmong–Mien: Hmongic; West Hmongic; Luobo River Miao

Language codes
- ISO 639-3: hml
- Glottolog: luop1235

Luobohe Miao (罗泊河 Luóbóhé Miao, Luobo River Miao, Luopohe Hmong; Xijia Miao 西家苗), also known as Hmjo or A-Hmyo, is a Miao language of China.

== Distribution ==
According to Chen Qiguang (2013), there are more than 50,000 ʔə55 m̥ø31 (Flowery Miao 花苗) speakers in Kaiyang, Fuquan, Longli, Guiding, Weng'an, and other counties of southeastern Guizhou.

According to Sun Hongkai (2017), Luobohe Miao is spoken by about 40,000 people in Fuquan, Guiding, Longli, Kaiyang, Kaili, and other counties. In Kaili City, it is spoken in Majiatun 马家屯, Dapaomu 大泡木, and other villages.

== Phonology ==
Luobo River Miao has an unusually small number of tones for a Hmongic language, with just three: high ˥ 55, rising ˨˦ 24, and falling ˧˩ 31.

== Xijia ==
Xijia (西家), a variety of Luobohe Miao, had 1,300 speakers as of 2000 in 21 villages surrounding Kaili City, Guizhou, and in Pingzhai Village (平寨村) of Longchang Township (龙厂乡), and Xiangma (响马村), Loumiao (娄苗菜), and Fuzhuang Villages of Lushan Township (卢山乡). It is also spoken in Majiatun Township (马家屯乡) and Dabaomu Township (大保姆乡) of Kaili City. The Xijia of Shiban Village (石板寨村), Dafengdong Township (大风洞乡), Kaili cannot communicate with the neighboring Ge (Gejia) people.

According to Chen Qiguang (2007), the Xijia (autonym: qo0 mjo31) numbered 1,941 people as of 1983, and were distributed in Laojunzhai (老君寨), Majiatun (马家屯), Shibanzhai 石板寨), and Daxiao Baoben (大小泡) of Kaili City.

Within Luobohe, Xijia is classified as "Dialect 1" (第一土语). while Yejipo Miao (野鸡坡话) is classified as "Dialect 2" (第二土语). Chen's (2007) data was collected by Luo Daoqin (罗道钦 from Shibanzhai (石板寨) in 1983. Additionally, a Miao variety spoken in Gusa (谷撒寨), Sizhai Village (四寨村), Xinpu Township (新铺乡), Guiding County, Guizhou belongs to the "Dialect 2" cluster.

== Works cited ==
- Chen, Qiguang 陈其光 (2013). Miáo-Yáo yǔwén 苗瑶语文 [Miao and Yao Language] (in Chinese). Beijing: Zhongyang minzu daxue chubanshe.
