= Songshan, Guizhou =

Songshan 松山镇
- Town
- Interactive map of Songshan
- Coordinates: 25°45′19″N 106°05′03″E
- Country: People's Republic of China
- Province: Guizhou
- Prefecture-level city: Anshun
- Autonomous county: Ziyun
- Village-level divisions: 5 residential communities 26 villages
- Elevation: 1,158 m (3,799 ft)
- Time zone: UTC+8 (China Standard)
- Postal code: 550800
- Area code: 0853

Songshan (Chinese: 松山; pinyin: Sōngshān) is a town and the seat of Ziyun Miao and Buyei Autonomous County in southwestern Guizhou province, China. As of 2011, it has five residential communities (居委会) and 26 villages under its administration.

== See also ==
- List of township-level divisions of Guizhou
