= Wei Xiuying (born 1910) =

Chinese politician (1910-2005)

- 危秀英
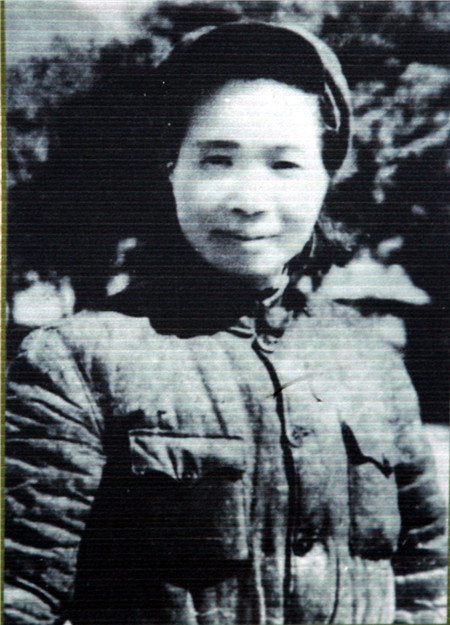

Representative at the First, Second and Third National People's Congresses
- In office 1954–1975

Personal details
- Born: 1910 Ruijin, Jiangxi, Qing China
- Died: 2005 (aged 94–95)
- Party: Chinese Communist Party
- Spouse: Zhong Chibing

Wei Xiuying (Chinese: 危秀英; pinyin: Wēi Xiùyīng; 1910 - 2005) was a Chinese politician. She was one of thirty women who participated in the Long March with the First Front Red Army.

== Biography ==
Wei was born in Ruijin, Jiangxi in 1910, and was sold as a child bride to a merchant from Xingguo County when she was six. She ran away with men she worked with on the fields to join the Red Army in 1930, but was initially rejected as they were not looking for women. She joined the Chinese Communist Party in 1932, becoming the only woman in her unit. In 1933, she headed the Women's Department of the Xingguo Provincial Committee, and she headed the Jiangxi Provincial Committee in 1934.

During the Long March, Wei was designated as a "political fighter", doing propaganda and hiring bearers. Due to her diminutive build, she earned the nickname "Shortie". After reaching Yan'an at the end of the March, she was attached to the Women's Bureau. In 1938, she was sent back to Jiangxi to carry out guerilla activities. She returned to Yan'an to attend the Marx-Lenin school and the elite Party School in the 1940s. Between 1945 and 1949, she held various posts, including secretary to the Provincial Women's Committee and head of the Organization Department of Jinhua. After those, she became the secretary of the Women's Committee of the Jiangxi Provincial Party Committee, the deputy head of the Rural Work Team Department of the All-China Women's Federation, and a member of the Standing Committee of the Jiangxi Chinese People's Political Consultative Conference.

Wei retired in 1981 while retaining her seat in the Standing Committee of the Jiangxi Chinese People's Political Consultative Conference, and died in 2005.
