= Ancient Hebrew language =

Ancient Hebrew (ISO 639-3 code hbo) is a blanket term for pre-modern varieties of the Hebrew language:

- Biblical Hebrew (including the use of Tiberian vocalization)
- Mishnaic Hebrew, a form of the Hebrew language that is found in the Talmud

== See also ==
- Ancient Hebrew writings
- Paleo-Hebrew alphabet, a variant of the Phoenician alphabet
