= Pingtang County =

Pingtang County 平塘县
- County
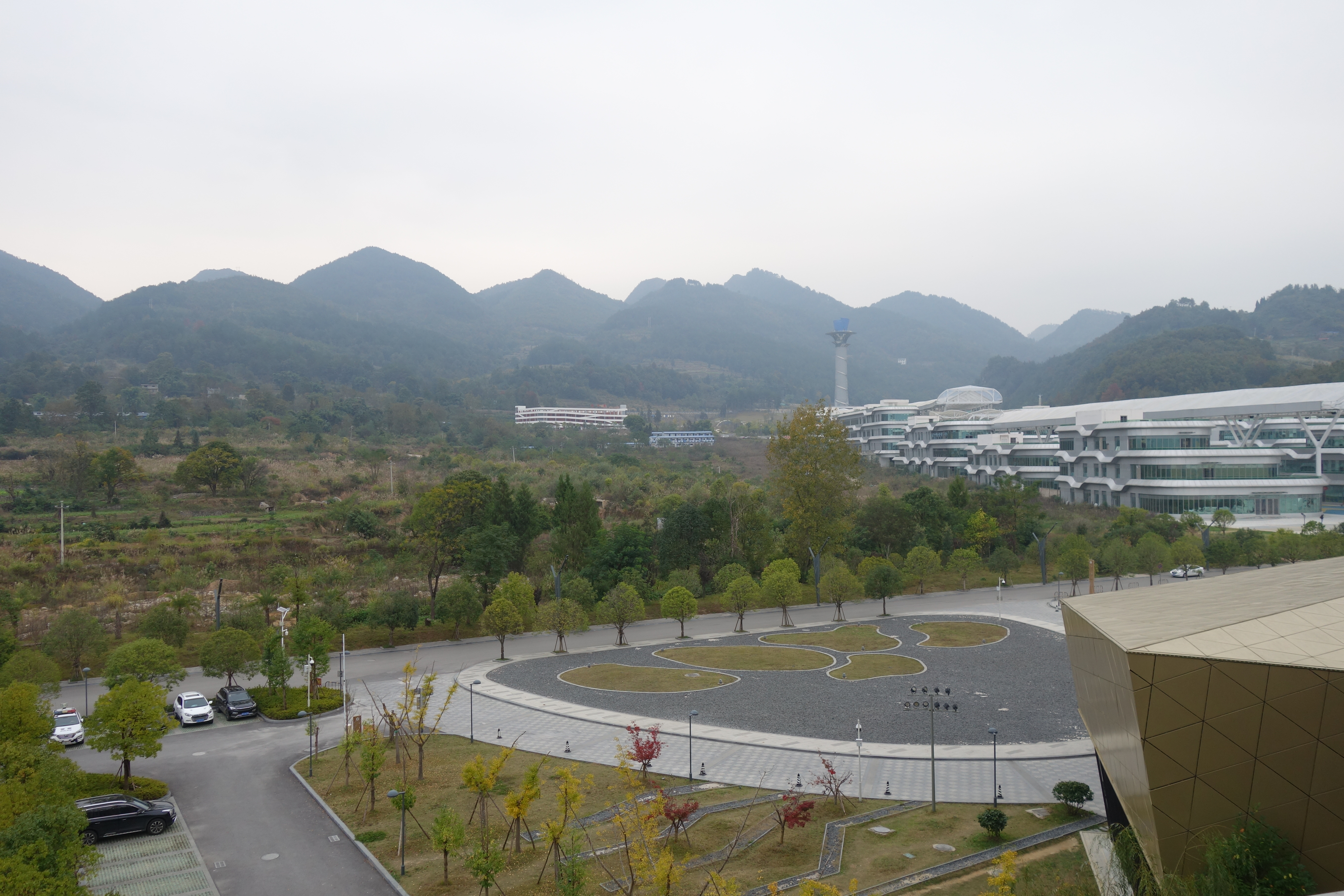

- Location of the seat in Guizhou Pingtang (Southwest China)
- Coordinates (Pingtang County government): 25°49′21″N 107°19′21″E
- Country: China
- Province: Guizhou
- Autonomous prefecture: Qiannan
- County seat: Jinpen

Area
  - Total: 2,799.08 km^{2} (1,080.73 sq mi)

Population (2010)
  - Total: 228,377
  - Density: 81.5900/km^{2} (211.317/sq mi)
- Time zone: UTC+8 (China Standard)

Pingtang County (Chinese: 平塘县; pinyin: Píngtáng Xiàn) is a county in the Qiannan Buyei and Miao Autonomous Prefecture of Guizhou province, China, bordering Guangxi to the south. It is a high mountain valley and is inhabited mainly by members of the Buyei and Miao ethnic minorities, who together make up 55% of the county's population.

The county's area is 2,799.08 square km and at the 2010 Census its population was 228,560. The county's government is based in the town of Pinghu.

The Five Hundred Meter Aperture Spherical Telescope (FAST) is located in the southwestern part of Pingtan County, near its Kedu and Tangbian Towns and Dongjia Township of the adjacent Luodian County.

== Administrative divisions ==
Pingtang County is divided into 1 subdistrict, 9 towns and 1 ethnic township:

subdistrict

- Jinpen Subdistrict 金盆街道

towns

- Pingzhou Town 平舟镇
- Yazhou Town 牙舟镇
- Tongzhou Town 通州镇
- Datang Town 大塘镇
- Kedu Town 克度镇
- Tangbian Town 塘边镇
- Jiacha Town 甲茶镇
- Zhemi Town 者密镇
- Zhangbu Town 掌布镇

ethnic township

- Kapu Maonan Ethnic Township 卡蒲毛南族乡

== Curiosities ==
=== Five-hundred-meter Aperture Spherical Telescope ===
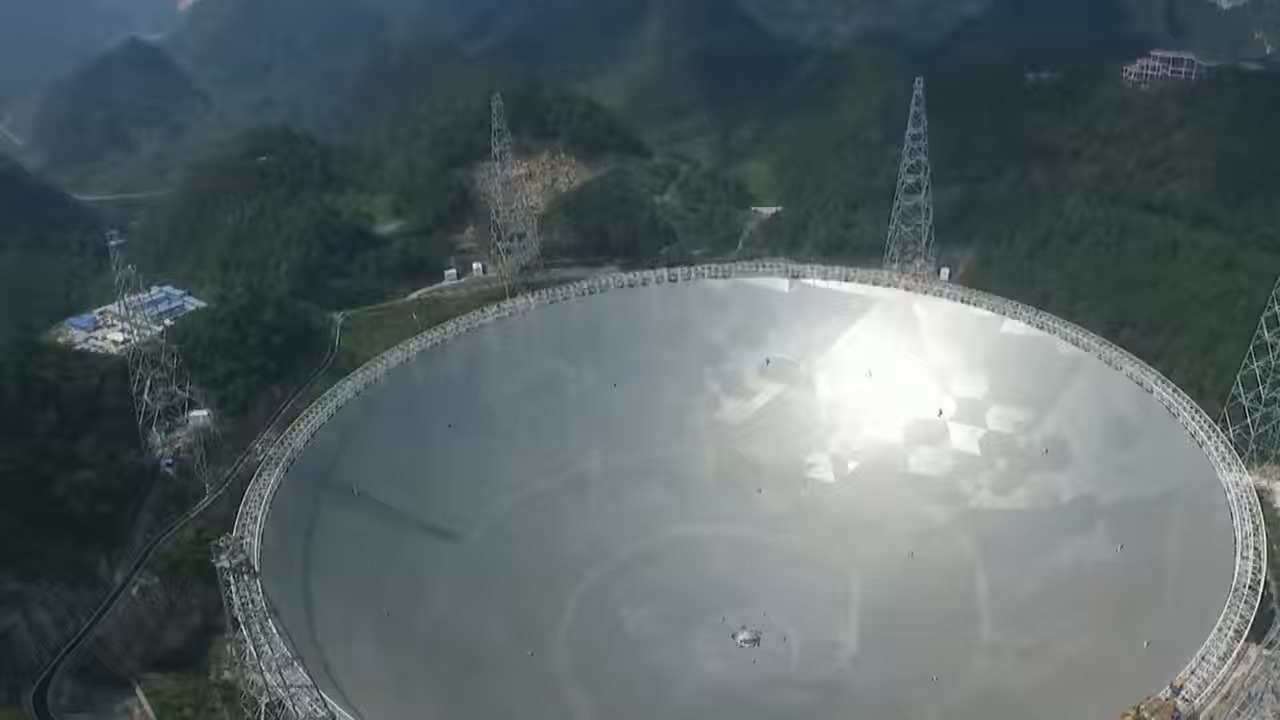
FAST radio telescope

The world's largest filled-aperture radio telescope, Five-hundred-meter Aperture Spherical Telescope (FAST) is located in the Dawodang, a natural sinkhole in Pingtang.

== Climate ==
Climate data for Pingtang, elevation 709 m (2,326 ft), (1991–2020 normals, extremes 1981–present)
Month	Jan	Feb	Mar	Apr	May	Jun	Jul	Aug	Sep	Oct	Nov	Dec	Year
Record high °C (°F)	24.6 (76.3)	32.2 (90.0)	33.4 (92.1)	35.4 (95.7)	34.9 (94.8)	34.2 (93.6)	36.1 (97.0)	36.6 (97.9)	35.8 (96.4)	33.5 (92.3)	30.3 (86.5)	27.9 (82.2)	36.6 (97.9)
Mean daily maximum °C (°F)	10.8 (51.4)	14.2 (57.6)	18.2 (64.8)	23.6 (74.5)	26.7 (80.1)	28.7 (83.7)	30.3 (86.5)	30.6 (87.1)	28.3 (82.9)	23.3 (73.9)	19.3 (66.7)	13.9 (57.0)	22.3 (72.2)
Daily mean °C (°F)	6.6 (43.9)	9.5 (49.1)	13.0 (55.4)	18.3 (64.9)	21.7 (71.1)	24.1 (75.4)	25.3 (77.5)	24.8 (76.6)	22.2 (72.0)	18.0 (64.4)	13.6 (56.5)	8.8 (47.8)	17.2 (62.9)
Mean daily minimum °C (°F)	3.9 (39.0)	6.4 (43.5)	9.6 (49.3)	14.5 (58.1)	18.0 (64.4)	21.0 (69.8)	22.1 (71.8)	21.2 (70.2)	18.3 (64.9)	14.7 (58.5)	10.1 (50.2)	5.6 (42.1)	13.8 (56.8)
Record low °C (°F)	−4.0 (24.8)	−4.1 (24.6)	−1.7 (28.9)	2.4 (36.3)	6.8 (44.2)	12.5 (54.5)	13.8 (56.8)	15.1 (59.2)	10.0 (50.0)	4.9 (40.8)	−1.2 (29.8)	−5.1 (22.8)	−5.1 (22.8)
Average precipitation mm (inches)	24.7 (0.97)	29.2 (1.15)	54.2 (2.13)	95.7 (3.77)	201.8 (7.94)	217.0 (8.54)	202.8 (7.98)	104 (4.1)	79.6 (3.13)	72.2 (2.84)	42.6 (1.68)	22.7 (0.89)	1,146.5 (45.12)
Average precipitation days (≥ 0.1 mm)	11.3	11.3	14.2	15.5	16.3	17.0	17.2	12.7	9.9	11.2	9.1	8.9	154.6
Average snowy days	1.9	0.8	0.2	0	0	0	0	0	0	0	0	0.4	3.3
Average relative humidity (%)	77	76	76	77	77	81	81	81	79	79	78	75	78
Mean monthly sunshine hours	45.4	57.0	76.3	104.4	123.2	106.8	156.2	177.1	142.6	96.9	91.7	67.3	1,244.9
Percentage possible sunshine	14	18	20	27	30	26	37	44	39	27	28	21	28
Source: China Meteorological Administration
