= Gha-Mu language =

Miao language of Guizhou, China

Gha-Mu
- Small Flowery Miao
- Native to: China
- Region: Guizhou
- Ethnicity: Gha-Mu
- Native speakers: (84,000 cited 1995)
- Language family: Hmong–Mien: Hmongic; West Hmongic; Chuanqiandian cluster; Gha-Mu

Language codes
- ISO 639-3: sfm
- Glottolog: smal1236

Gha-Mu, often translated as Small Flowery Miao (Chinese: 小花苗; pinyin: Xiǎo Huā Miáo), is a Miao language of China spoken by the Gha-Mu people. It is closely related to the Hmong dialects of China and Laos; both Gha-Mu and Hmong are members of the Chuanqiandian cluster of West Hmongic languages. It is spoken in Nayong, Shuicheng, Zhenning, Guanling, and Hezhang counties of western Guizhou, China.
