= Gha-Mu people =

Ethnic group in China

Gha-Mu, also known as Small Flowery Miao (Chinese: 小花苗; pinyin: xiǎo huā miáo) and Blue Hmong, are a Miao ethnic group in China. They are from Guizhou and belong to the Hmong people. Many of them are Christians. The number of persons within this group likely exceeds 100,000. They are speakers of the Gha-Mu language.

== Sources ==
- Miao, Small Flowery
