= Raojia language =

Hmongic language of Guizhou, China

Raojia
- Native to: China
- Region: Majiang County, Guizhou
- Native speakers: (5,000 cited 1993)
- Language family: Hmong–Mien: Hmongic; East Hmongic; Raojia

Language codes
- ISO 639-3: None (mis)
- Glottolog: None

Raojia (Chinese: 绕家语; autonym: ʔeu33 ʑu21 or qɑ24 ʑuɤ24) is a Hmongic language spoken by about 5,000 people in 3 villages (including Baixing 白兴村) of Heba Township 河坝乡, Majiang County, Guizhou.

Raojia belongs to the Qiandong Miao (East Hmongic) branch (Li Yunbing 2000; Chen Qiguang 2013).
