= Pingba, Anshun =

Pingba 平坝区
- District
- Location of the district seat in Guizhou Pingba (Southwest China)
- Coordinates (Pingba District government): 26°24′22″N 106°15′21″E
- Country: China
- Province: Guizhou
- Prefecture-level city: Anshun
- District seat: Anping

Area
  - Total: 985.49 km^{2} (380.50 sq mi)

Population (2010)
  - Total: 298,034
  - Density: 302.42/km^{2} (783.27/sq mi)
- Time zone: UTC+8 (China Standard)

Pingba District (simplified Chinese: 平坝区; traditional Chinese: 平壩區; pinyin: Píngbà Qū) is a district of the city of Anshun, Guizhou province, China.

== Administrative divisions ==
Pingba District is divided into 2 subdistricts, 7 towns and 2 ethnic townships:

subdistricts

- Gulou 鼓楼街道
- Anping 安平街道

towns

- Baiyun 白云镇
- Tianlong 天龙镇
- Gaofeng 高峰镇
- Xiayun 夏云镇
- Leping 乐平镇
- Qibo 齐伯镇
- Machang 马场镇

ethnic townships

- Shizi Hui and Miao Ethnic Township 十字回族苗族乡
- Yangchang Bouyei and Miao Ethnic Township 羊昌布依族苗族乡

== Climate ==
Climate data for Pingba, elevation 1,298 m (4,259 ft), (1991–2020 normals, extremes 1981–2010)
Month	Jan	Feb	Mar	Apr	May	Jun	Jul	Aug	Sep	Oct	Nov	Dec	Year
Record high °C (°F)	22.9 (73.2)	30.1 (86.2)	32.5 (90.5)	33.8 (92.8)	35.3 (95.5)	33.4 (92.1)	35.1 (95.2)	35.2 (95.4)	34.6 (94.3)	30.9 (87.6)	27.8 (82.0)	22.8 (73.0)	35.3 (95.5)
Mean daily maximum °C (°F)	7.8 (46.0)	11.2 (52.2)	15.7 (60.3)	20.8 (69.4)	23.5 (74.3)	25.0 (77.0)	26.8 (80.2)	27.3 (81.1)	24.5 (76.1)	19.2 (66.6)	15.5 (59.9)	10.0 (50.0)	18.9 (66.1)
Daily mean °C (°F)	4.3 (39.7)	6.8 (44.2)	10.7 (51.3)	15.6 (60.1)	18.7 (65.7)	20.9 (69.6)	22.5 (72.5)	22.3 (72.1)	19.6 (67.3)	15.3 (59.5)	11.2 (52.2)	6.2 (43.2)	14.5 (58.1)
Mean daily minimum °C (°F)	2.1 (35.8)	4.1 (39.4)	7.6 (45.7)	12.1 (53.8)	15.4 (59.7)	18.1 (64.6)	19.7 (67.5)	19.1 (66.4)	16.5 (61.7)	12.8 (55.0)	8.5 (47.3)	3.7 (38.7)	11.6 (53.0)
Record low °C (°F)	−6.2 (20.8)	−5.5 (22.1)	−3.4 (25.9)	2.5 (36.5)	5.6 (42.1)	11.8 (53.2)	11.8 (53.2)	13.0 (55.4)	9.1 (48.4)	1.8 (35.2)	−3.3 (26.1)	−5.9 (21.4)	−6.2 (20.8)
Average precipitation mm (inches)	30.2 (1.19)	24.3 (0.96)	39.9 (1.57)	75.3 (2.96)	180.0 (7.09)	291.3 (11.47)	233.3 (9.19)	149.1 (5.87)	108.1 (4.26)	98.9 (3.89)	40.4 (1.59)	22.5 (0.89)	1,293.3 (50.93)
Average precipitation days (≥ 0.1 mm)	17.0	14.4	16.2	16.1	17.5	19.3	16.6	14.6	12.5	16.8	12.5	13.6	187.1
Average snowy days	4.8	2.7	0.4	0	0	0	0	0	0	0	0.1	1.7	9.7
Average relative humidity (%)	84	81	79	77	78	82	82	80	79	82	81	81	81
Mean monthly sunshine hours	39.2	57.7	83.9	111.3	112.6	88.4	141.1	158.0	118.4	74.8	80.2	58.0	1,123.6
Percentage possible sunshine	12	18	22	29	27	22	34	39	32	21	25	18	25
Source: China Meteorological Administration
