= Huishui County =

Huishui County 惠水县
- County
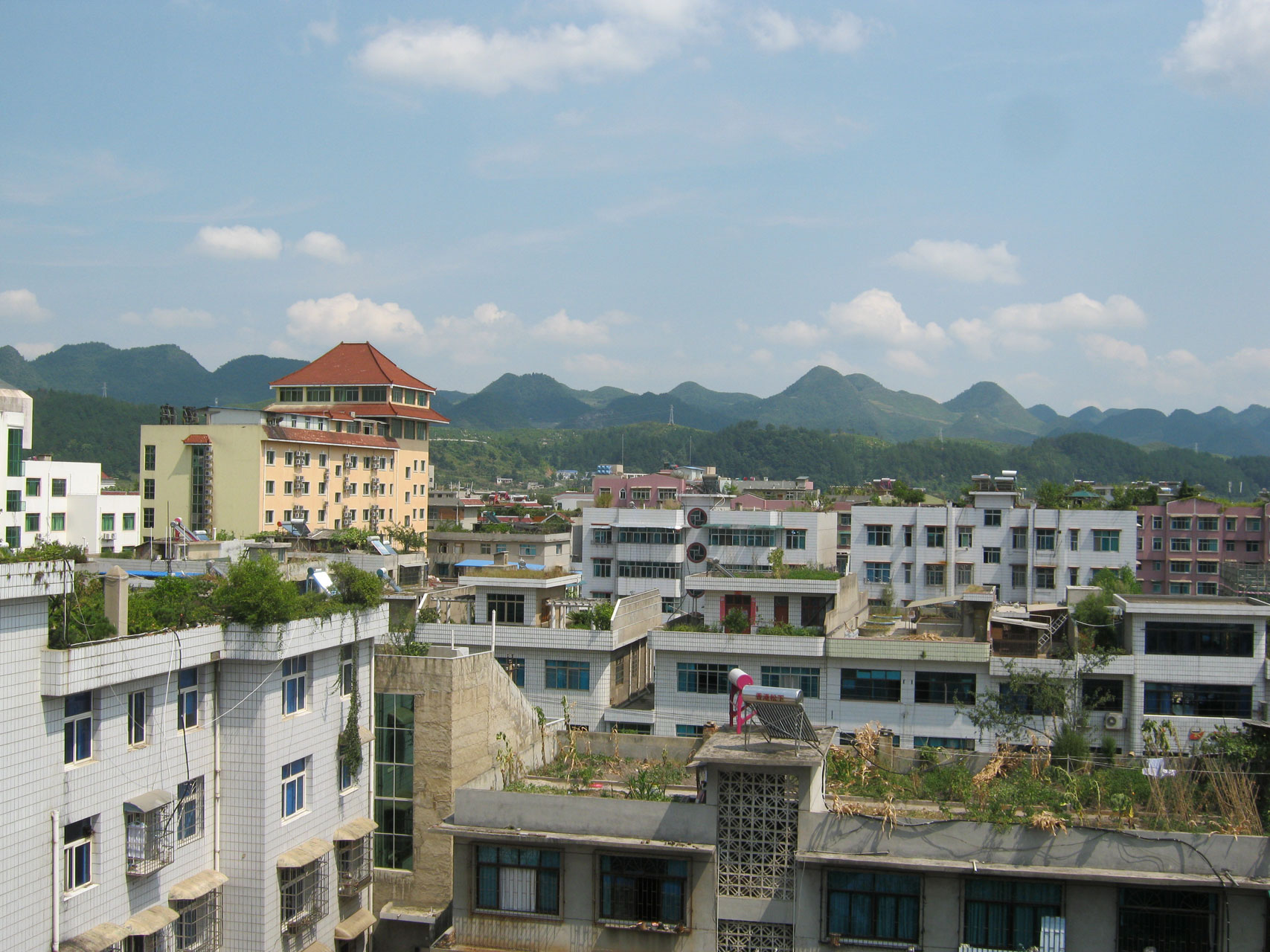

- Location of the seat in Guizhou Huishui (Southwest China)
- Coordinates (Huishui County government): 26°07′55″N 106°39′25″E
- Country: China
- Province: Guizhou
- Autonomous prefecture: Qiannan

Area
  - Total: 2,463.8 km^{2} (951.3 sq mi)
- Highest elevation (Longtanshan (龙塘山)): 1,690.7 m (5,547 ft)
- Lowest elevation (Dachang River): 666 m (2,185 ft)

Population (2010)
  - Total: 476,900
  - Density: 193.6/km^{2} (501.3/sq mi)
- Time zone: UTC+8 (China Standard)
- Website: www.gzhs.gov.cn

Huishui (Chinese: 惠水; pinyin: Huìshuǐ) is a county of south-central Guizhou province, China. It is under the administration of the Qiannan Buyei and Miao Autonomous Prefecture. 61% of its 476,900 population are minorities, including Bouyei, Miao, Hui, Zhuang, Sui, Bai, and Maonan. In 1372 it was the seat of the historic Chengfan commandery (程番府).

Within Guizhou it is noted for its orange cultivation.

The gecko species Hemiphyllodactylus huishuiensis was first discovered in, and named after Huishui. A locally distributed species of Gesneriaceae plants was only found in Huishui.

== Administrative divisions ==
Huishui governs 3 subdistricts and 8 towns:

- Lianjiang subdistrict (涟江街道)
- Mengjiang subdistrict (濛江街道)
- Mingtian subdistrict (明田街道)
- Haohuahong town (好花红镇)
- Baijin town (摆金镇)
- Yashui town (雅水镇)
- Duanshan town (断杉镇)
- Lushan town (芦山镇)
- Wangyou town (王佑镇)
- Xiantang town (羡塘镇)
- Gangdu town (岗度镇)

== Climate ==
Climate data for Huishui, elevation 992 m (3,255 ft), (1991–2020 normals, extremes 1981–2010)
Month	Jan	Feb	Mar	Apr	May	Jun	Jul	Aug	Sep	Oct	Nov	Dec	Year
Record high °C (°F)	23.4 (74.1)	29.9 (85.8)	31.6 (88.9)	33.7 (92.7)	35.0 (95.0)	34.2 (93.6)	34.8 (94.6)	35.3 (95.5)	34.8 (94.6)	31.3 (88.3)	28.2 (82.8)	27.0 (80.6)	35.3 (95.5)
Mean daily maximum °C (°F)	10.0 (50.0)	13.4 (56.1)	17.8 (64.0)	23.0 (73.4)	25.6 (78.1)	27.3 (81.1)	29.0 (84.2)	29.2 (84.6)	26.6 (79.9)	21.5 (70.7)	17.7 (63.9)	12.2 (54.0)	21.1 (70.0)
Daily mean °C (°F)	6.1 (43.0)	8.8 (47.8)	12.6 (54.7)	17.5 (63.5)	20.6 (69.1)	22.8 (73.0)	24.2 (75.6)	23.8 (74.8)	21.2 (70.2)	17.0 (62.6)	12.9 (55.2)	7.9 (46.2)	16.3 (61.3)
Mean daily minimum °C (°F)	3.7 (38.7)	5.7 (42.3)	9.1 (48.4)	13.7 (56.7)	16.8 (62.2)	19.6 (67.3)	21.0 (69.8)	20.2 (68.4)	17.5 (63.5)	14.0 (57.2)	9.6 (49.3)	5.1 (41.2)	13.0 (55.4)
Record low °C (°F)	−5.1 (22.8)	−3.5 (25.7)	−2.9 (26.8)	3.0 (37.4)	6.0 (42.8)	11.5 (52.7)	12.0 (53.6)	13.8 (56.8)	7.9 (46.2)	2.6 (36.7)	−2.1 (28.2)	−6.9 (19.6)	−6.9 (19.6)
Average precipitation mm (inches)	24.1 (0.95)	20.3 (0.80)	43.5 (1.71)	73.8 (2.91)	195.8 (7.71)	267.9 (10.55)	222.0 (8.74)	135.3 (5.33)	100.5 (3.96)	86.8 (3.42)	39.5 (1.56)	18.8 (0.74)	1,228.3 (48.38)
Average precipitation days (≥ 0.1 mm)	13.3	11.2	13.9	14.4	17.1	18.0	17.1	15.0	11.6	14.6	10.3	10.2	166.7
Average snowy days	2.3	0.8	0.3	0	0	0	0	0	0	0	0	0.5	3.9
Average relative humidity (%)	80	77	76	75	77	81	81	80	79	81	79	78	79
Mean monthly sunshine hours	36.6	55.6	78.3	107.9	115.4	91.4	139.0	158.9	128.9	82.1	81.0	58.0	1,133.1
Percentage possible sunshine	11	18	21	28	28	22	33	40	35	23	25	18	25
Source: China Meteorological Administration

== Transport ==
- G69 Yinchuan–Baise Expressway
- G7611 Duyun–Shangri-La Expressway
