= Guiding County =

Guiding County 贵定县 Kweiting
- County
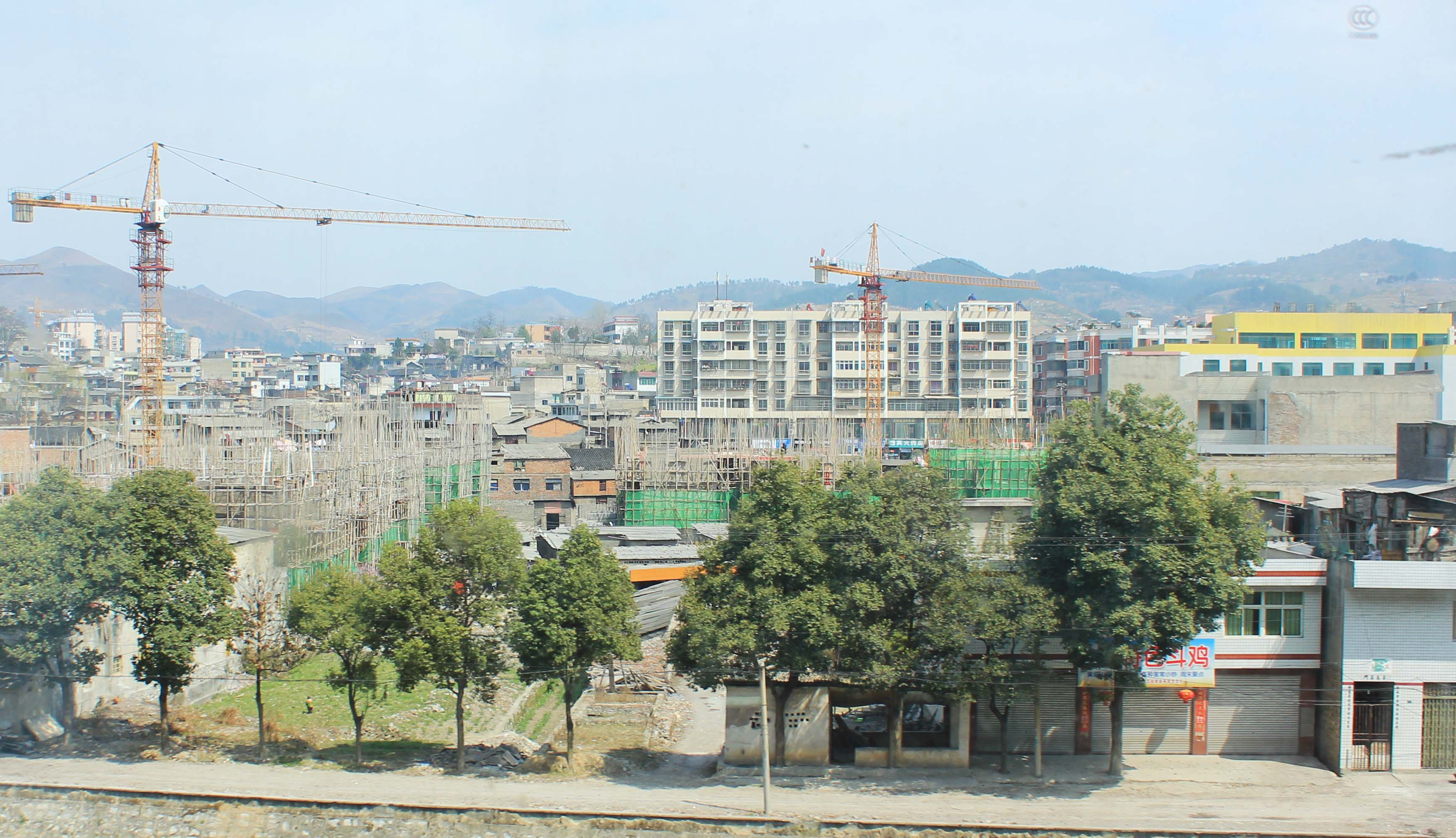

- Location of the seat in Guizhou Guiding (Southwest China)
- Coordinates (Guiding County government): 26°33′26″N 107°13′56″E
- Country: China
- Province: Guizhou
- Autonomous prefecture: Qiannan
- County seat: Baoshan

Area
  - Total: 1,631 km^{2} (630 sq mi)

Population (2010)
  - Total: 231,015
  - Density: 141.6/km^{2} (366.8/sq mi)
- Time zone: UTC+8 (China Standard)
- Postal code: 551300
- Area code: 0854
- Website: http://www.guiding.gov.cn/

Guiding County (simplified Chinese: 贵定县; traditional Chinese: 貴定縣; pinyin: Guìdìng Xiàn) is a county of south-central Guizhou, China. It is under the administration of the Qiannan Buyei and Miao Autonomous Prefecture. The county seat is located in the town of Chengguan.

The town of Changmingzhen (昌明镇) has a Laoganma factory that opened during the COVID-19 pandemic in China.

== Administrative divisions ==
Guiding County is divided into 2 subdistricts and 6 towns:

subdistricts

- Jinnan 金南街道
- Baoshan 宝山街道

towns

- Dexin 德新镇
- Xinba 新巴镇
- Panjiang 盘江镇
- Yanshan 沿山镇
- Changming 昌明镇
- Yunwu 云雾镇

== Transportation ==
=== Rail ===
- Guizhou–Guangxi Railway

== Climate ==
Climate data for Guiding, elevation 1,056 m (3,465 ft), (1991–2020 normals, extremes 1981–2010)
Month	Jan	Feb	Mar	Apr	May	Jun	Jul	Aug	Sep	Oct	Nov	Dec	Year
Record high °C (°F)	22.8 (73.0)	29.8 (85.6)	31.9 (89.4)	33.8 (92.8)	35.5 (95.9)	33.3 (91.9)	35.1 (95.2)	35.2 (95.4)	33.9 (93.0)	30.8 (87.4)	27.3 (81.1)	24.9 (76.8)	35.5 (95.9)
Mean daily maximum °C (°F)	8.2 (46.8)	11.6 (52.9)	16.0 (60.8)	21.4 (70.5)	24.5 (76.1)	26.6 (79.9)	28.7 (83.7)	28.8 (83.8)	25.8 (78.4)	20.6 (69.1)	16.5 (61.7)	10.9 (51.6)	20.0 (67.9)
Daily mean °C (°F)	4.7 (40.5)	7.4 (45.3)	11.2 (52.2)	16.3 (61.3)	19.8 (67.6)	22.3 (72.1)	24.1 (75.4)	23.6 (74.5)	20.7 (69.3)	16.2 (61.2)	11.9 (53.4)	6.8 (44.2)	15.4 (59.8)
Mean daily minimum °C (°F)	2.4 (36.3)	4.6 (40.3)	8.1 (46.6)	12.8 (55.0)	16.3 (61.3)	19.4 (66.9)	21.0 (69.8)	20.2 (68.4)	17.3 (63.1)	13.3 (55.9)	8.8 (47.8)	4.0 (39.2)	12.4 (54.2)
Record low °C (°F)	−5.8 (21.6)	−5.7 (21.7)	−3.6 (25.5)	2.3 (36.1)	5.4 (41.7)	11.1 (52.0)	12.3 (54.1)	13.5 (56.3)	8.2 (46.8)	2.9 (37.2)	−2.6 (27.3)	−6.3 (20.7)	−6.3 (20.7)
Average precipitation mm (inches)	27.4 (1.08)	25.2 (0.99)	52.5 (2.07)	86.3 (3.40)	174.2 (6.86)	229.9 (9.05)	197.7 (7.78)	127.5 (5.02)	105.4 (4.15)	88.4 (3.48)	41.9 (1.65)	22.4 (0.88)	1,178.8 (46.41)
Average precipitation days (≥ 0.1 mm)	14.2	11.8	14.9	15.5	17.0	18.0	16.0	14.6	11.7	14.8	10.9	11.2	170.6
Average snowy days	5.1	2.4	0.6	0	0	0	0	0	0	0	0.1	1.9	10.1
Average relative humidity (%)	81	78	78	77	78	82	80	79	79	82	79	78	79
Mean monthly sunshine hours	31.6	50.8	69.7	91.6	102.8	78.9	132.2	140.8	115.8	77.3	75.1	53.0	1,019.6
Percentage possible sunshine	10	16	19	24	25	19	31	35	32	22	23	16	23
Source: China Meteorological Administration
