= Wangmo County =

Wangmo County 望谟县
- County
- Location of the seat in Guizhou Wangmo (Southwest China)
- Coordinates (Wangmo County government): 25°10′29″N 106°05′41″E
- Country: China
- Province: Guizhou
- Autonomous prefecture: Qianxinan
- County seat: Wangmu

Area
  - Total: 3,005.5 km^{2} (1,160.4 sq mi)

Population (2010)
  - Total: 251,629
  - Density: 83.723/km^{2} (216.84/sq mi)
- Time zone: UTC+8 (China Standard)

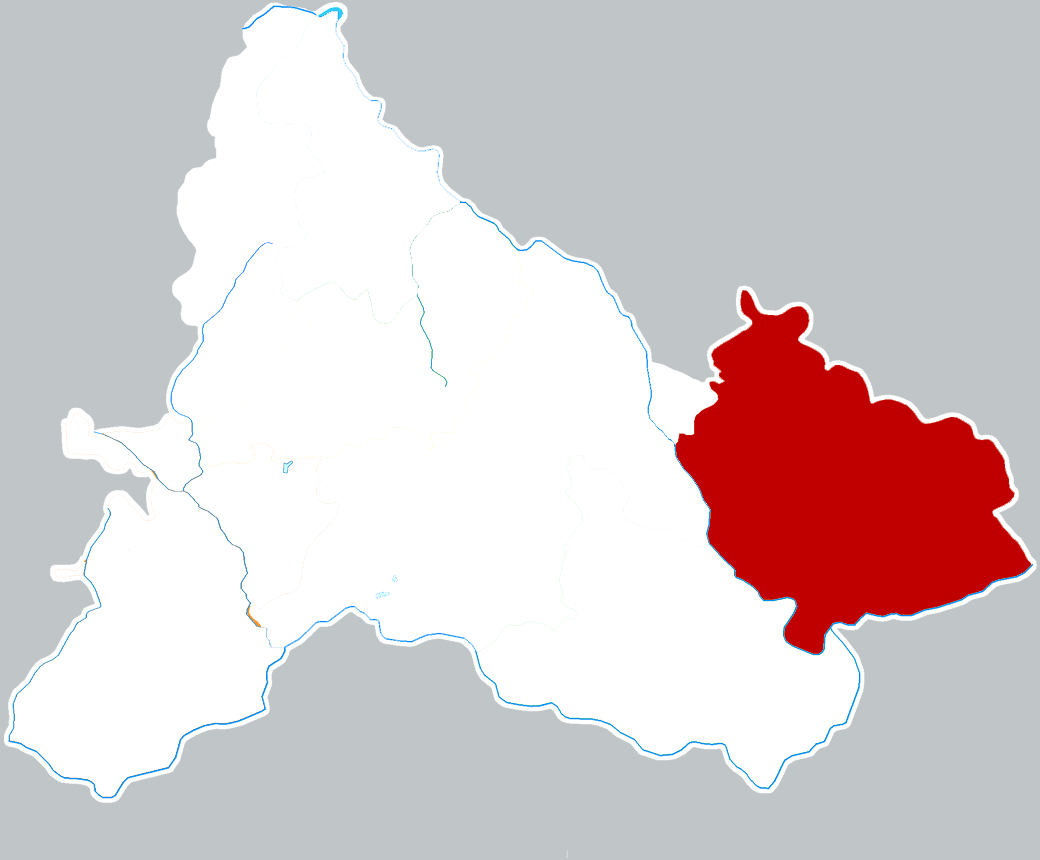
Location of Wagmno county in Qianxinan buyei and miao autonomous prefecture.

Wangmo County (simplified Chinese: 望谟县; traditional Chinese: 望謨縣; pinyin: Wàngmó Xiàn) (Bouyei: Weangzmox xianq) is a county in the southwest of Guizhou province, China, bordering Guangxi to the southeast. It is under the administration of the Qianxinan Buyei and Miao Autonomous Prefecture.

== Administrative divisions ==
Wangmo County is divided into 4 subdistricts, 11 towns and 1 ethnic township:

subdistricts

- Wangmu Subdistrict 王母街道
- Pingdong Subdistrict 平洞街道
- Xintun Subdistrict 新屯街道
- Pantao Subdistrict 蟠桃街道

towns

- Leyuan Town 乐元镇
- Dayi Town 打易镇
- Lewang Town 乐旺镇
- Sanglang Town 桑郎镇
- Mashan Town 麻山镇
- Shitun Town 石屯镇
- Jiaona Town 郊纳镇
- Zhexiang Town 蔗香镇
- Daguan Town 大观镇
- Bianrao Town 边饶镇
- Angwu Town 昂武镇

ethnic township

- Youmai Yao Ethnic Township 油迈瑶族乡

== Climate ==
Wangmo recorded 122.5 millimetres (4.82 inches) of rainfall in one hour, on 9 June 2011, the most rainfall in the county in 200 years. And on 20 June 2011, 312 mm (12.28 in) of rain fell in 3hrs in the county as part of significant flooding across the region.

Climate data for Wangmo, elevation 567 m (1,860 ft), (1991–2020 normals, extremes 1981–present)
Month	Jan	Feb	Mar	Apr	May	Jun	Jul	Aug	Sep	Oct	Nov	Dec	Year
Record high °C (°F)	30.5 (86.9)	34.4 (93.9)	37.1 (98.8)	38.8 (101.8)	38.5 (101.3)	37.3 (99.1)	36.9 (98.4)	37.2 (99.0)	37.3 (99.1)	34.4 (93.9)	31.9 (89.4)	30.2 (86.4)	38.8 (101.8)
Mean daily maximum °C (°F)	15.2 (59.4)	18.6 (65.5)	22.8 (73.0)	27.7 (81.9)	29.8 (85.6)	30.9 (87.6)	31.8 (89.2)	31.9 (89.4)	30.0 (86.0)	25.5 (77.9)	22.1 (71.8)	17.0 (62.6)	25.3 (77.5)
Daily mean °C (°F)	10.6 (51.1)	13.2 (55.8)	17.0 (62.6)	21.6 (70.9)	24.3 (75.7)	25.9 (78.6)	26.6 (79.9)	26.2 (79.2)	24.1 (75.4)	20.4 (68.7)	16.4 (61.5)	12.0 (53.6)	19.9 (67.8)
Mean daily minimum °C (°F)	7.8 (46.0)	9.7 (49.5)	13.3 (55.9)	17.4 (63.3)	20.1 (68.2)	22.4 (72.3)	23.2 (73.8)	22.6 (72.7)	20.5 (68.9)	17.3 (63.1)	13.0 (55.4)	8.9 (48.0)	16.4 (61.4)
Record low °C (°F)	−2.0 (28.4)	0.6 (33.1)	0.6 (33.1)	6.5 (43.7)	10.3 (50.5)	12.4 (54.3)	15.4 (59.7)	16.8 (62.2)	11.0 (51.8)	7.2 (45.0)	1.6 (34.9)	−2.5 (27.5)	−2.5 (27.5)
Average precipitation mm (inches)	26.3 (1.04)	19.9 (0.78)	37.8 (1.49)	66.5 (2.62)	185.8 (7.31)	284.7 (11.21)	215.7 (8.49)	175.4 (6.91)	93.9 (3.70)	79.7 (3.14)	40.7 (1.60)	19.0 (0.75)	1,245.4 (49.04)
Average precipitation days (≥ 0.1 mm)	10.9	8.3	10.1	11.6	14.1	16.2	16.1	14.9	9.8	11.8	7.8	7.7	139.3
Average snowy days	0.6	0.2	0	0	0	0	0	0	0	0	0	0.1	0.9
Average relative humidity (%)	78	73	70	70	73	80	80	81	79	81	79	77	77
Mean monthly sunshine hours	56.0	76.6	98.9	137.3	150.2	131.3	165.8	179.6	148.4	99.8	106.0	75.4	1,425.3
Percentage possible sunshine	17	24	26	36	36	32	40	45	41	28	33	23	32
Source: China Meteorological Administration
