= Gejia language =

Hmongic language of Guizhou, China

Gejia
- Ge, Chong'an River Miao
- 𱎼家语, 重安江苗语
- Native to: China
- Region: Guizhou
- Ethnicity: Gejia
- Native speakers: (60,000 cited 1995)
- Language family: Hmong–Mien: Hmongic; West Hmongic; ? Chuanqiandian cluster; Gejia
- Dialects: Gejia; Dongjia

Language codes
- ISO 639-3: hmj
- Glottolog: geee1239

The Ge or Gejia language (Chinese: 𱎼家语), also known as Chong'anjiang Miao (Chinese: 重安江苗语), is a West Hmongic language of Huangping County, Guizhou, China. The endonym is spelled Mhong, though it shares this with Huishui Miao; it is pronounced [m̥ōŋ], as in the Hmong language. When speaking Chinese, they call themselves Gédōu.

Gejia is spoken in eastern Guizhou, in speech islands within the Hmu language (Qiandong Miao 黔东苗语) area. Dongjia, spoken nearby in Majiang County, is closely related to Gejia.

== Distribution ==
Sun (2017) lists the following locations for Chong'anjiang Miao, and gives a speaker population estimate of 40,000.

- Huangping County: Fengtang 枫塘, Chongxin 重新, Chongren 崇仁, etc.
- Kaili City: Longchang 龙场, Ganba 甘坝, Longshan 龙山, Longchang 隆昌, Bibo 碧波, etc.
