= Luodian County =

Luodian County 罗甸县
- County
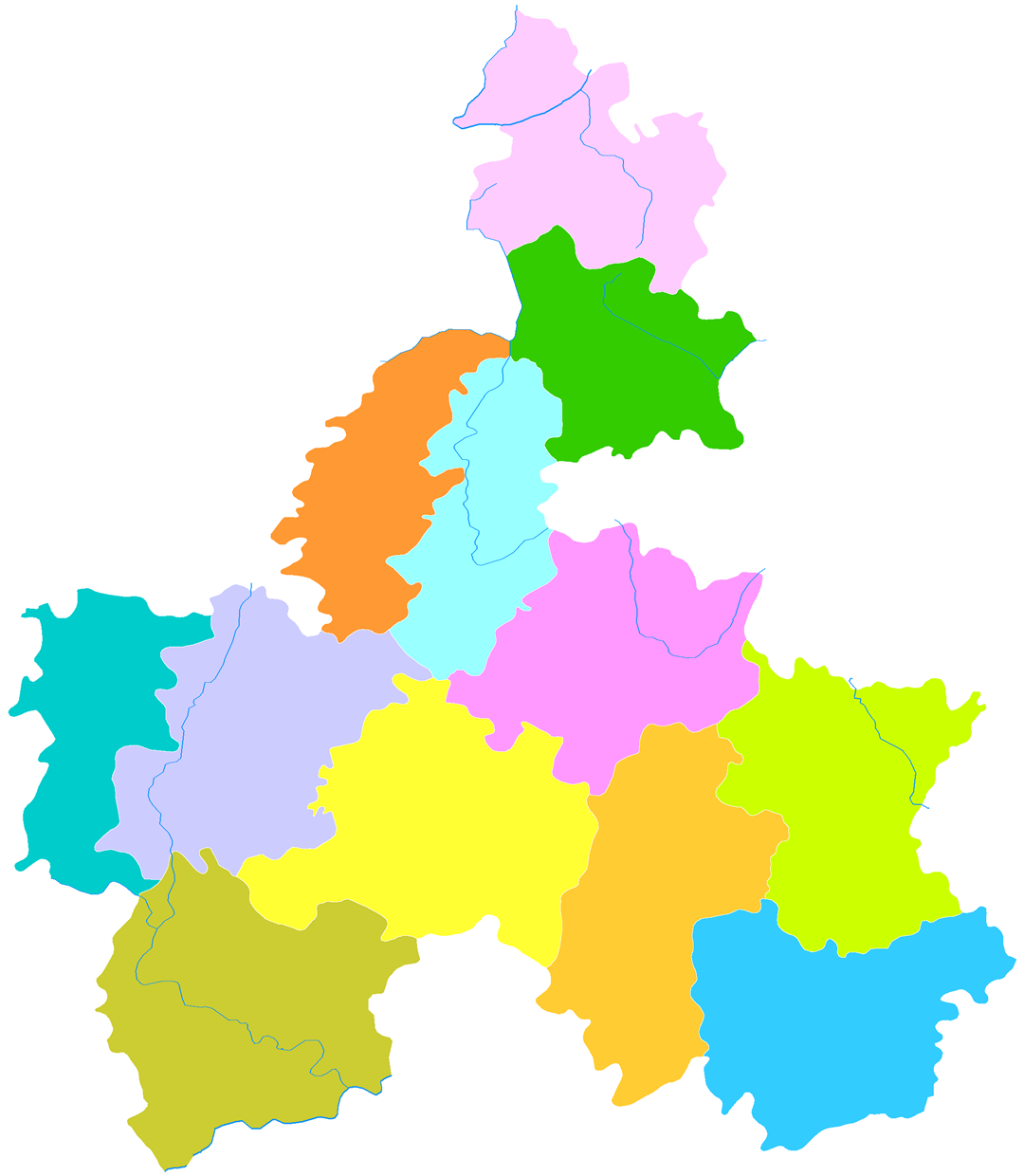
- Luodian is the division at the southwest corner of this map of Qiannan

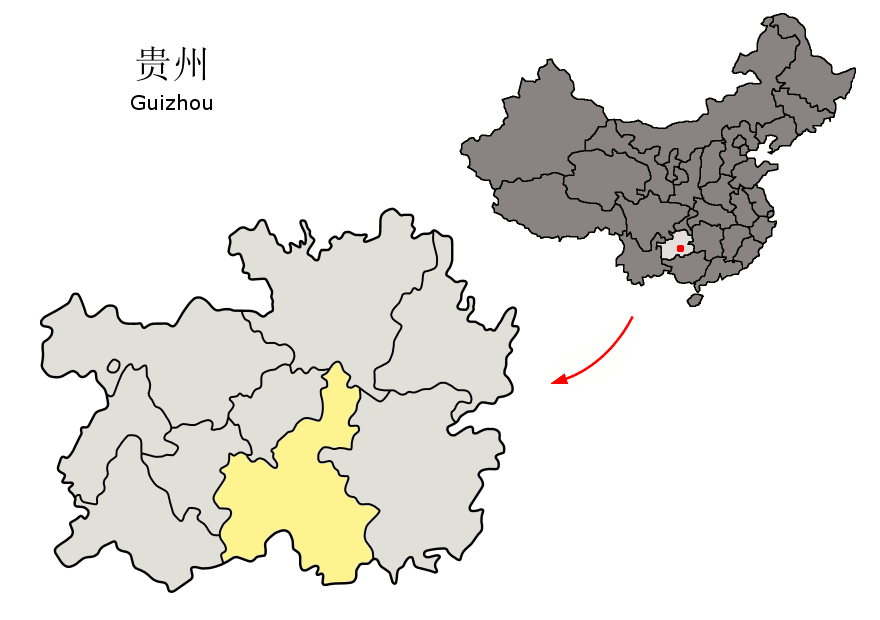
- Qiannan in Guizhou
- Coordinates (Luodian County government): 25°25′33″N 106°45′07″E
- Country: China
- Province: Guizhou
- Autonomous prefecture: Qiannan
- County seat: Longping

Area
  - Total: 3,010 km^{2} (1,160 sq mi)

Population (2010)
  - Total: 256,488
  - Density: 85.2/km^{2} (221/sq mi)
- Time zone: UTC+8 (China Standard)

Luodian County (simplified Chinese: 罗甸县; traditional Chinese: 羅甸縣; pinyin: Luódiàn Xiàn) (Bouyei language: Lachos xianq) is a county under the administration of Qiannan Buyei and Miao Autonomous Prefecture in the south of Guizhou province, China, bordering Guangxi to the south.

The climate in the area is humid subtropical, with strong monsoon influences bringing heavy rain during the summer. Winters are dry due to the influence of the Siberian high-pressure system.

The county seat and the largest town in the county is also named Luodian; it was formerly known as Longping.

The county is frequented by both Chinese and foreign geologists, with the core area of work called Big Guizhoutan, or Big Guizhou Shoal. This has been called a "treasure land for Triassic Period research."

== Administrative divisions ==
Luodian County is divided into 1 subdistrict, 8 towns and 1 township:

subdistrict

- Huxing 斛兴街道

towns

- Longping 龙坪镇
- Bianyang 边阳镇
- Fengting 逢亭镇
- Moyang 沫阳镇
- Maojing 茂井镇
- Luokun 罗悃镇
- Hongshuihe 红水河镇
- Muyin 木引镇

township

- Fengting 凤亭乡

== History ==
In 629, the Tang dynasty put Le'an County (now Luodian) under the jurisdiction of Zhuangzhou.

Luodian was the seat of the Yi-speaking Luodian Kingdom (羅甸國) in the 9th century.

In 1292, Yuan dynasty set up Yuanfu, Le'an County was renamed Luobo County, and was put under its jurisdiction.

During the Ming dynasty, Luodian County was affiliated to the Luoboguan Inspection Department of Xilongzhou, Guangxi Province.

In the Qing dynasty, in 1727, Yongfeng Prefecture was set up, and the Luoju Court (now Luodian) was within the territory.

In 1749, Luojing Prefecture was renamed to the Prefecture of Fanzhou and was transferred to Guiyang Prefecture.

In 1913, Luojing was under the jurisdiction of Yuzhong Circuit (in Guiyang). In 1914, Luojing was set up as a county of Guizhou Province.

On March 23, 1951, Luodian was under PRC control, and the next day the Luodian County People's Government was established.

== Climate ==
Climate data for Luodian, elevation 450 m (1,480 ft), (1991–2020 normals, extremes 1981–present)
Month	Jan	Feb	Mar	Apr	May	Jun	Jul	Aug	Sep	Oct	Nov	Dec	Year
Record high °C (°F)	31.6 (88.9)	35.5 (95.9)	38.4 (101.1)	40.1 (104.2)	41.2 (106.2)	37.6 (99.7)	39.6 (103.3)	38.5 (101.3)	38.5 (101.3)	36.3 (97.3)	33.6 (92.5)	32.6 (90.7)	41.2 (106.2)
Mean daily maximum °C (°F)	14.8 (58.6)	18.1 (64.6)	22.4 (72.3)	27.6 (81.7)	30.0 (86.0)	31.3 (88.3)	32.6 (90.7)	33.0 (91.4)	30.8 (87.4)	26.1 (79.0)	22.2 (72.0)	16.9 (62.4)	25.5 (77.9)
Daily mean °C (°F)	10.4 (50.7)	13.0 (55.4)	16.7 (62.1)	21.5 (70.7)	24.2 (75.6)	26.0 (78.8)	27.0 (80.6)	26.7 (80.1)	24.6 (76.3)	20.6 (69.1)	16.5 (61.7)	11.9 (53.4)	19.9 (67.9)
Mean daily minimum °C (°F)	7.8 (46.0)	9.7 (49.5)	13.1 (55.6)	17.3 (63.1)	20.2 (68.4)	22.6 (72.7)	23.5 (74.3)	23.0 (73.4)	20.8 (69.4)	17.4 (63.3)	13.1 (55.6)	8.9 (48.0)	16.5 (61.6)
Record low °C (°F)	−1.4 (29.5)	−0.1 (31.8)	2.3 (36.1)	7.4 (45.3)	10.7 (51.3)	16.4 (61.5)	15.8 (60.4)	16.9 (62.4)	13.1 (55.6)	7.9 (46.2)	2.5 (36.5)	−1.8 (28.8)	−1.8 (28.8)
Average precipitation mm (inches)	20.4 (0.80)	21.0 (0.83)	44.3 (1.74)	77.1 (3.04)	189.9 (7.48)	273.6 (10.77)	193.1 (7.60)	122.9 (4.84)	94.4 (3.72)	64.2 (2.53)	35.6 (1.40)	17.3 (0.68)	1,153.8 (45.43)
Average precipitation days (≥ 0.1 mm)	8.4	7.5	10.0	12.6	14.5	16.5	16.3	13.5	9.4	9.9	7.2	6.6	132.4
Average snowy days	0.8	0.2	0	0	0	0	0	0	0	0	0	0.3	1.3
Average relative humidity (%)	75	72	71	72	76	82	82	81	78	80	78	74	77
Mean monthly sunshine hours	44.9	61.5	82.6	116.8	128.9	107.7	149.8	173.1	138.9	95.1	90.8	66.7	1,256.8
Percentage possible sunshine	13	19	22	30	31	26	36	43	38	27	28	20	28
Source: China Meteorological Administration all-time extreme temperature
