= Changshun County =

Changshun County 长顺县
- County
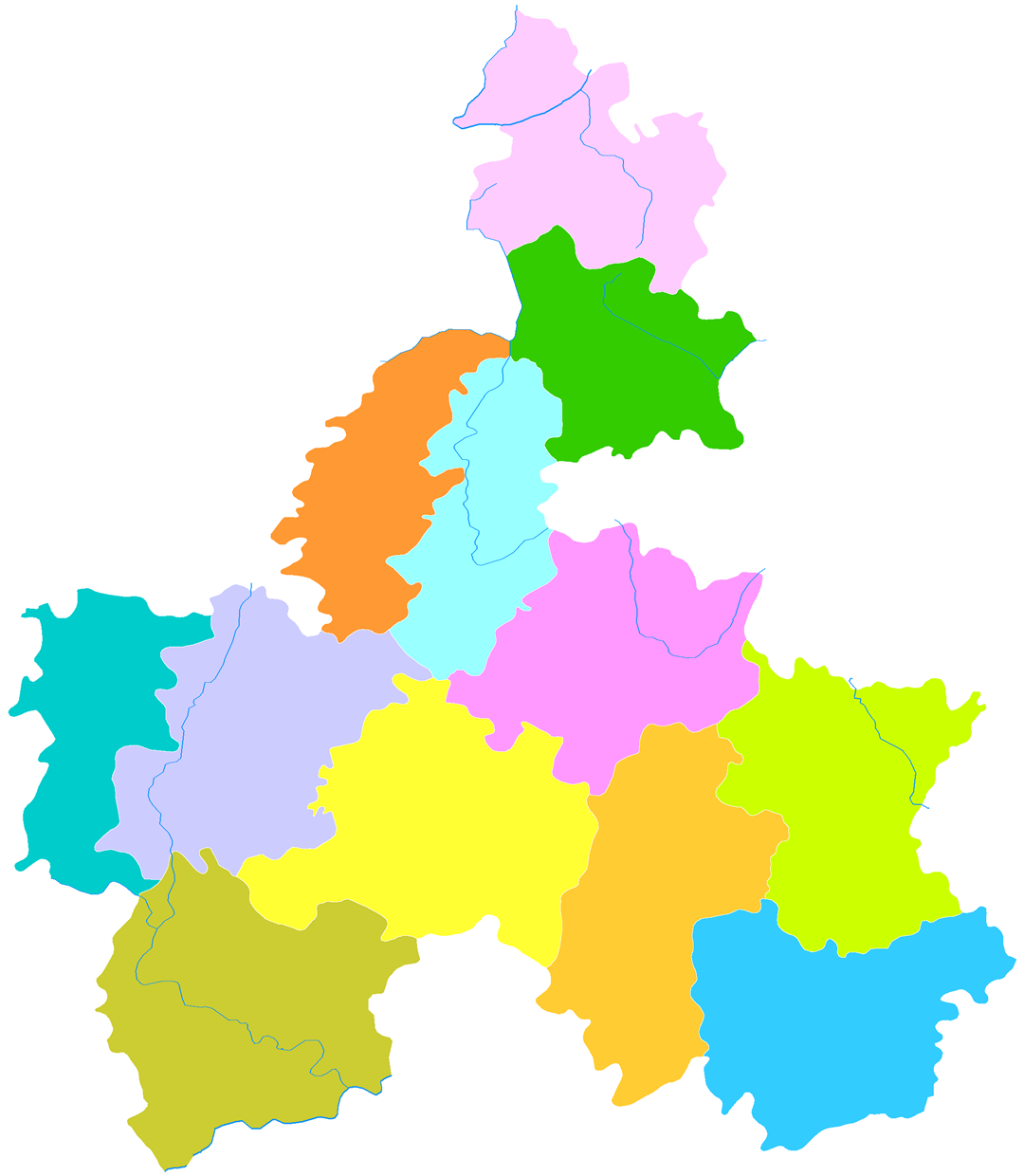
- Changshun is the westernmost division in this map of Qiannan

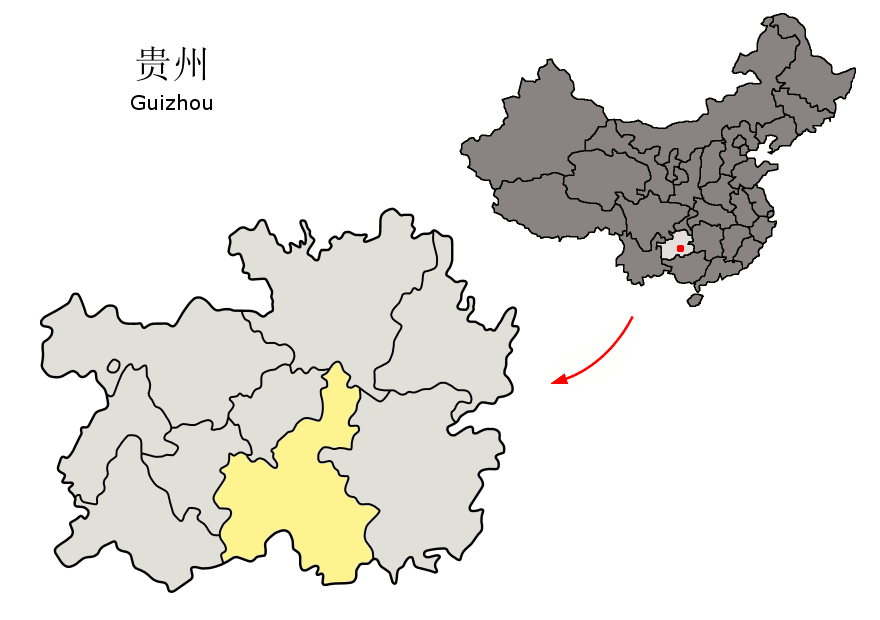
- Qiannan in Guizhou
- Coordinates (Changshun County government): 26°00′12″N 106°26′27″E
- Country: China
- Province: Guizhou
- Autonomous prefecture: Qiannan
- County seat: Changzhai

Area
  - Total: 1,554.6 km^{2} (600.2 sq mi)

Population (2020)
  - Total: 201,540
  - Density: 129.64/km^{2} (335.77/sq mi)
- Time zone: UTC+8 (China Standard)

Changshun County (simplified Chinese: 长顺县; traditional Chinese: 長順縣; pinyin: Chángshùn Xiàn) is a county of Guizhou, China. It is under the administration of the Qiannan Buyei and Miao Autonomous Prefecture.

== Administrative divisions ==
Changshun County is divided into 1 subdistrict, 5 towns and 1 township:

subdistrict

- Changzhai 长寨街道

towns

- Guangshun 广顺镇
- Baisuo 摆所镇
- Daihua 代化镇
- Baiyunshan 白云山镇
- Guyang 鼓扬镇

township

- Duncao 敦操乡

== Climate ==
Climate data for Changshun, elevation 1,187 m (3,894 ft), (1991–2020 normals)
Month	Jan	Feb	Mar	Apr	May	Jun	Jul	Aug	Sep	Oct	Nov	Dec	Year
Mean daily maximum °C (°F)	9.0 (48.2)	12.4 (54.3)	16.6 (61.9)	21.8 (71.2)	24.4 (75.9)	26.0 (78.8)	27.5 (81.5)	27.9 (82.2)	25.3 (77.5)	20.4 (68.7)	16.7 (62.1)	11.2 (52.2)	19.9 (67.9)
Daily mean °C (°F)	5.8 (42.4)	8.3 (46.9)	12.0 (53.6)	16.9 (62.4)	19.9 (67.8)	22.0 (71.6)	23.3 (73.9)	23.1 (73.6)	20.6 (69.1)	16.6 (61.9)	12.5 (54.5)	7.6 (45.7)	15.7 (60.3)
Mean daily minimum °C (°F)	3.6 (38.5)	5.6 (42.1)	9.1 (48.4)	13.5 (56.3)	16.7 (62.1)	19.4 (66.9)	20.6 (69.1)	20.0 (68.0)	17.6 (63.7)	14.1 (57.4)	9.8 (49.6)	5.2 (41.4)	12.9 (55.3)
Average precipitation mm (inches)	30.3 (1.19)	23.4 (0.92)	49.4 (1.94)	80.8 (3.18)	201.1 (7.92)	298.9 (11.77)	253.7 (9.99)	180.1 (7.09)	112.8 (4.44)	89.5 (3.52)	41.4 (1.63)	22 (0.9)	1,383.4 (54.49)
Average precipitation days (≥ 0.1 mm)	15.6	13.2	16.5	15.6	17.1	18.7	18.5	15.9	12.0	15.6	11.8	11.9	182.4
Average snowy days	2.9	1.0	0.3	0	0	0	0	0	0	0	0	0.8	5
Average relative humidity (%)	81	78	78	76	77	82	82	80	79	80	79	78	79
Mean monthly sunshine hours	34.5	50.0	74.8	105.6	110.1	80.5	117.9	141.8	111.3	70.6	76.0	55.2	1,028.3
Percentage possible sunshine	10	16	20	27	26	20	28	35	31	20	24	17	23
Source: China Meteorological Administration
