= Ziyun Miao and Buyei Autonomous County =

Ziyun County 紫云县 · Zijyunf xianq
- Autonomous county
- 紫云苗族布依族自治县; Zijyunf Buxyeeuz Buxqyaix Ziqziqxianq; Ziyun Miao and Buyei Autonomous County
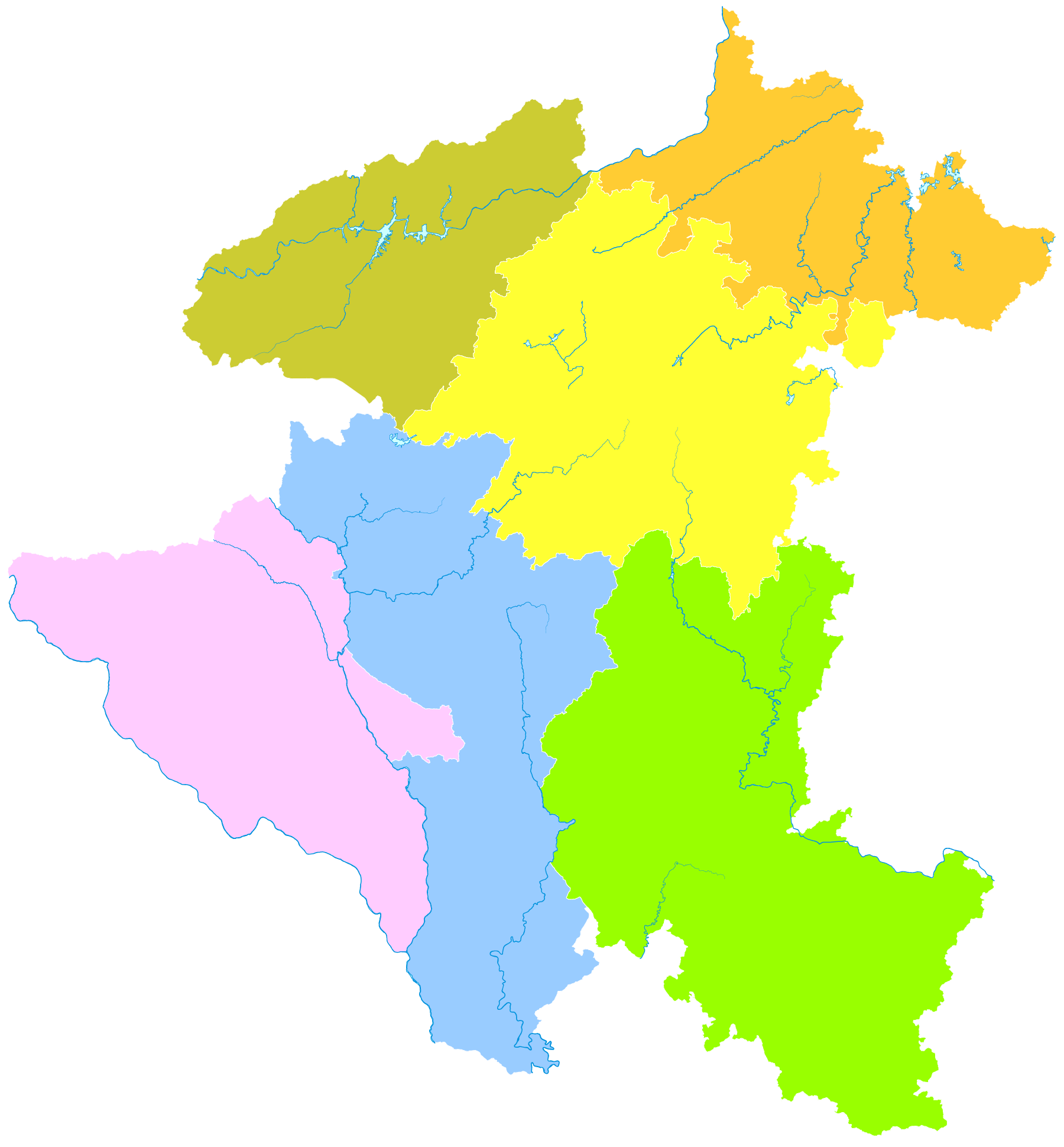
- Ziyun is the southernmost division (pink) in this map of Anshun

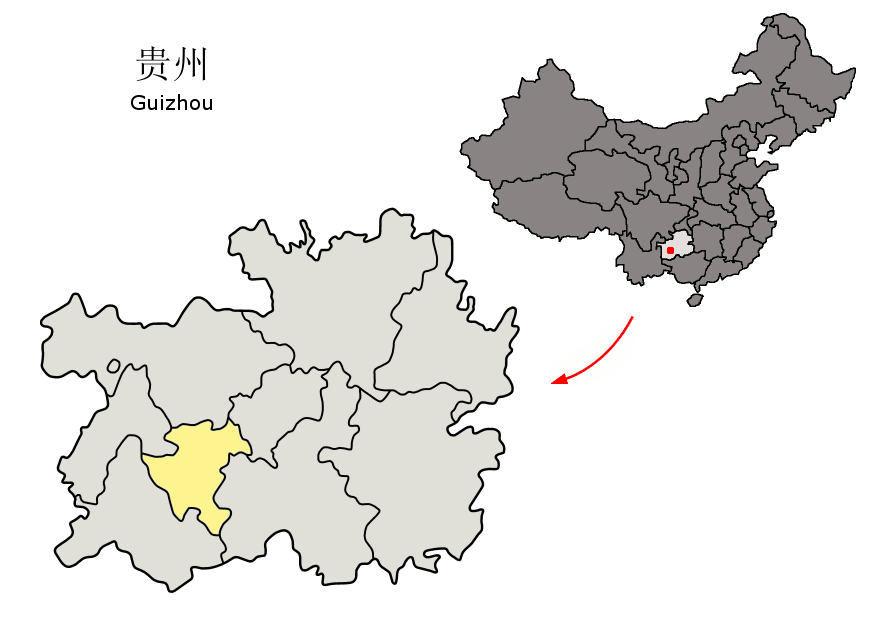
- Anshun in Guizhou

- Location within Guizhou Location within Southwest China
- Coordinates (Ziyun County government): 25°45′04″N 106°05′04″E
- Country: China
- Province: Guizhou
- Prefecture-level city: Anshun
- County seat: Songshan Subdistrict

Area
  - Total: 2,272.94 km^{2} (877.59 sq mi)

Population (2020 census)
  - Total: 293,651
  - Density: 129.194/km^{2} (334.612/sq mi)
- Time zone: UTC+8 (China Standard)
- Website: www.gzzy.gov.cn

Ziyun Miao and Buyei Autonomous County (simplified Chinese: 紫云苗族布依族自治县; traditional Chinese: 紫雲苗族布依族自治縣; pinyin: Zǐyún Miáozú Bùyīzú Zìzhìxiàn; Bouyei: Zijyunf Buxyeeuz Buxqyaix Ziqziqxianq) is a county in the southwest of Guizhou province, China. It is under the administration of the prefecture-level city of Anshun.

== Administrative divisions ==
Ziyun is divided into 3 subdistricts, 8 towns and 2 townships:

subdistricts

- Songshan Subdistrict (松山街道)
- Wufeng Subdistrict (五峰街道)
- Yunling Subdistrict (云岭街道)

towns

- Getuhe Town (格凸河镇)
- Houchang Town (猴场镇)
- Maoying Town (猫营镇)
- Bandang Town (板当镇)
- Daying Town (大营镇)
- Zongdi Town (宗地镇)
- Bayang Town (坝羊镇)
- Huohua Town (火花镇)

township

- Baishiyan Township (白石岩乡)
- Sidazhai Township (四大寨乡)

== Climate ==
Climate data for Ziyun, elevation 1,180 m (3,870 ft), (1991–2020 normals, extremes 1981–2010)
Month	Jan	Feb	Mar	Apr	May	Jun	Jul	Aug	Sep	Oct	Nov	Dec	Year
Record high °C (°F)	24.4 (75.9)	30.2 (86.4)	31.2 (88.2)	33.6 (92.5)	33.8 (92.8)	32.4 (90.3)	32.5 (90.5)	32.6 (90.7)	32.5 (90.5)	29.5 (85.1)	26.8 (80.2)	24.4 (75.9)	33.8 (92.8)
Mean daily maximum °C (°F)	9.6 (49.3)	13.0 (55.4)	17.3 (63.1)	22.2 (72.0)	24.6 (76.3)	25.8 (78.4)	27.1 (80.8)	27.3 (81.1)	25.1 (77.2)	20.3 (68.5)	16.8 (62.2)	11.5 (52.7)	20.1 (68.1)
Daily mean °C (°F)	6.0 (42.8)	8.6 (47.5)	12.3 (54.1)	17.1 (62.8)	19.9 (67.8)	21.8 (71.2)	22.9 (73.2)	22.7 (72.9)	20.4 (68.7)	16.4 (61.5)	12.5 (54.5)	7.7 (45.9)	15.7 (60.2)
Mean daily minimum °C (°F)	3.7 (38.7)	5.8 (42.4)	9.1 (48.4)	13.6 (56.5)	16.5 (61.7)	19.0 (66.2)	20.1 (68.2)	19.5 (67.1)	17.2 (63.0)	13.9 (57.0)	9.6 (49.3)	5.1 (41.2)	12.8 (55.0)
Record low °C (°F)	−4.7 (23.5)	−3.9 (25.0)	−3.6 (25.5)	2.8 (37.0)	5.8 (42.4)	12.1 (53.8)	10.8 (51.4)	13.1 (55.6)	6.7 (44.1)	3.2 (37.8)	−2.0 (28.4)	−5.1 (22.8)	−5.1 (22.8)
Average precipitation mm (inches)	25.9 (1.02)	20.0 (0.79)	41.0 (1.61)	73.0 (2.87)	198.9 (7.83)	298.6 (11.76)	239.1 (9.41)	159.5 (6.28)	94.7 (3.73)	83.3 (3.28)	36.2 (1.43)	18.4 (0.72)	1,288.6 (50.73)
Average precipitation days (≥ 0.1 mm)	13.4	10.6	13.3	13.8	16.3	18.2	18.1	16.3	11.6	15.1	10.1	10.5	167.3
Average snowy days	2.5	0.8	0.1	0	0	0	0	0	0	0	0.1	0.6	4.1
Average relative humidity (%)	82	78	77	75	77	83	84	82	80	82	80	79	80
Mean monthly sunshine hours	49.8	70.6	92.6	120.6	127.1	95.1	135.3	151.4	124.0	82.5	92.5	66.4	1,207.9
Percentage possible sunshine	15	22	25	31	31	23	32	38	34	23	29	20	27
Source: China Meteorological Administration
