= Kam–Sui peoples =

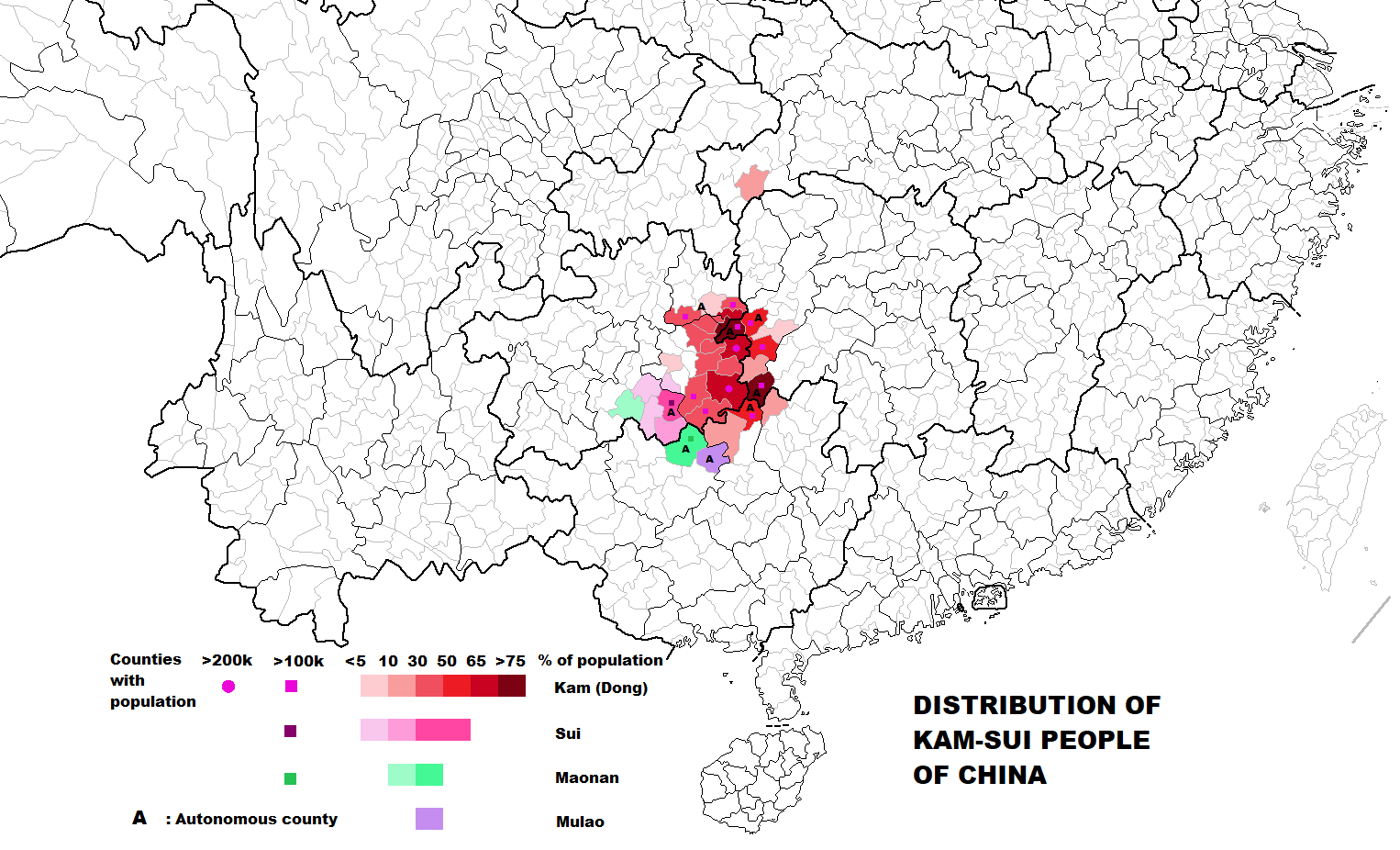
Distribution of the Kam–Sui peoples (as percentage of population) in China

The Kam–Sui peoples are a group of related ethnic groups in China and neighboring portions of Northern Laos and Vietnam. They are defined as speakers of Kam–Sui languages, which belong linguistically to the Kra–Dai languages.

== Kam–Sui of China ==
- Bouyei of Guizhou Province (including Ai-Cham, Mak and T'en, although most Bouyei are nuclear Tai)
- Dong of Guizhou, Hunan and Guangxi Provinces (also referred to as the Kam people)
- Mulao of Guizhou Province
- Maonan of Guangxi Province
- Sui of Guizhou, Yunnan and Guangxi Provinces (also spelled "Shui")

=== Cao Miao people ===
The Cao Miao people of Guizhou, Hunan and Guangxi Provinces speak a Kam-Sui language called Mjiuniang, although it is believed that the people are of Hmong–Mien descent.

=== Biao people ===
Whether or not the Biao people of China are of Kam-Sui descent is an issue of present debate in the scientific community. They are, however, a Tai ethnic group.

=== Kang people ===
The Kang people of Yunnan Province (referred to as Tai Khang in Laos) speak a Kam–Sui language, but ethnically descend from the Dai people.

== Kam–Sui of Vietnam ==
The following Kam–Sui ethnic groups originating in China have population clusters in Vietnam:

- Dong (also referred to as the Kam people)
- Sui (also referred to as the Shui people in China)

== Tai Khang people of Laos ==
The Tai Khang people of Laos (referred to as Kang in China) speak a Kam–Sui language, but ethnically descend from the Dai people.
