= Sui people =

Ethnic group in Guizhou Province, China

Sui people 水族
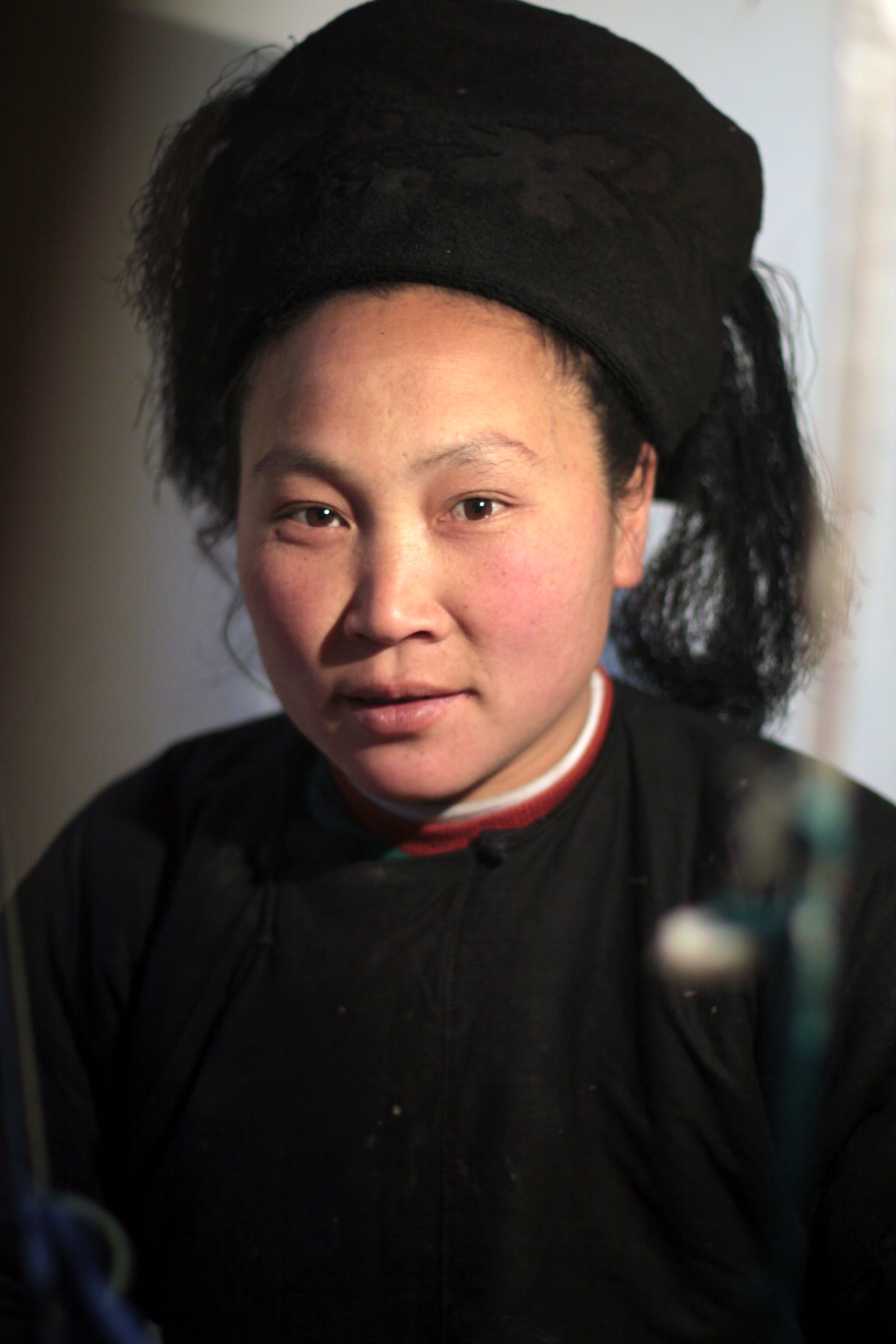
- A Sui woman in Guizhou, China

Total population
- 495,928 (2020 census)

Regions with significant populations
- China (Guizhou, Guangxi); Vietnam

Languages
- Mandarin Chinese, Sui

Religion
- Buddhism, Taoism

The Sui people (Chinese: 水族; pinyin: Shuǐzú; autonym: ai33 sui33), also spelled as Shui people, are an ethnic group living mostly in Guizhou Province, China. They are counted as one of the 56 ethnic groups officially recognized by the People's Republic of China.

== History ==
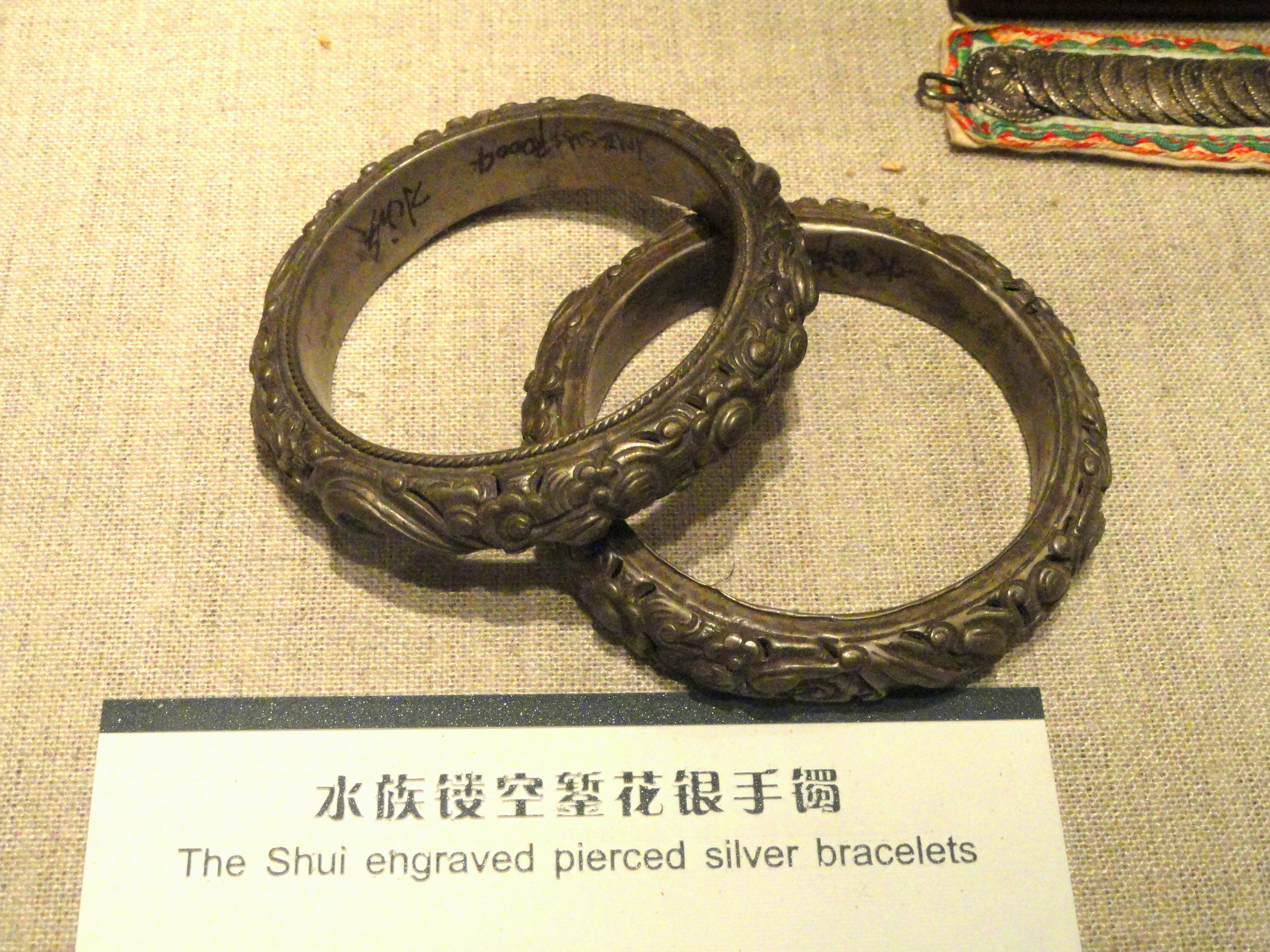
Bracelet worn by the Sui people

The Sui are descended from the ancient Baiyue peoples, who had inhabited southern China before the Han dynasty (Wei 2003:viii). The name "Sui," which means "water" in Chinese, was adopted during the Ming Dynasty.

== Demographics ==
Today, 93% of all Sui people (322,000 individuals) reside in Guizhou, China, with 63% of them living in Sandu Shui Autonomous County. To the south, 10,000 Sui live around Yingdong village in Rongshui County, Guangxi (Edmondson 2008). Small pockets of Sui people also live in Fuyang and Yiliang Counties, Yunnan. Additionally, there are 120 Sui living in Hồng Quang District, Tuyên Quang Province, northern Vietnam who are the descendants of Sui people who had left Sandu County 8 generations ago (Wei 2003:vii).

== Language ==
The Sui speak a Kam–Sui language, part of the Kra–Dai languages.

== Society ==
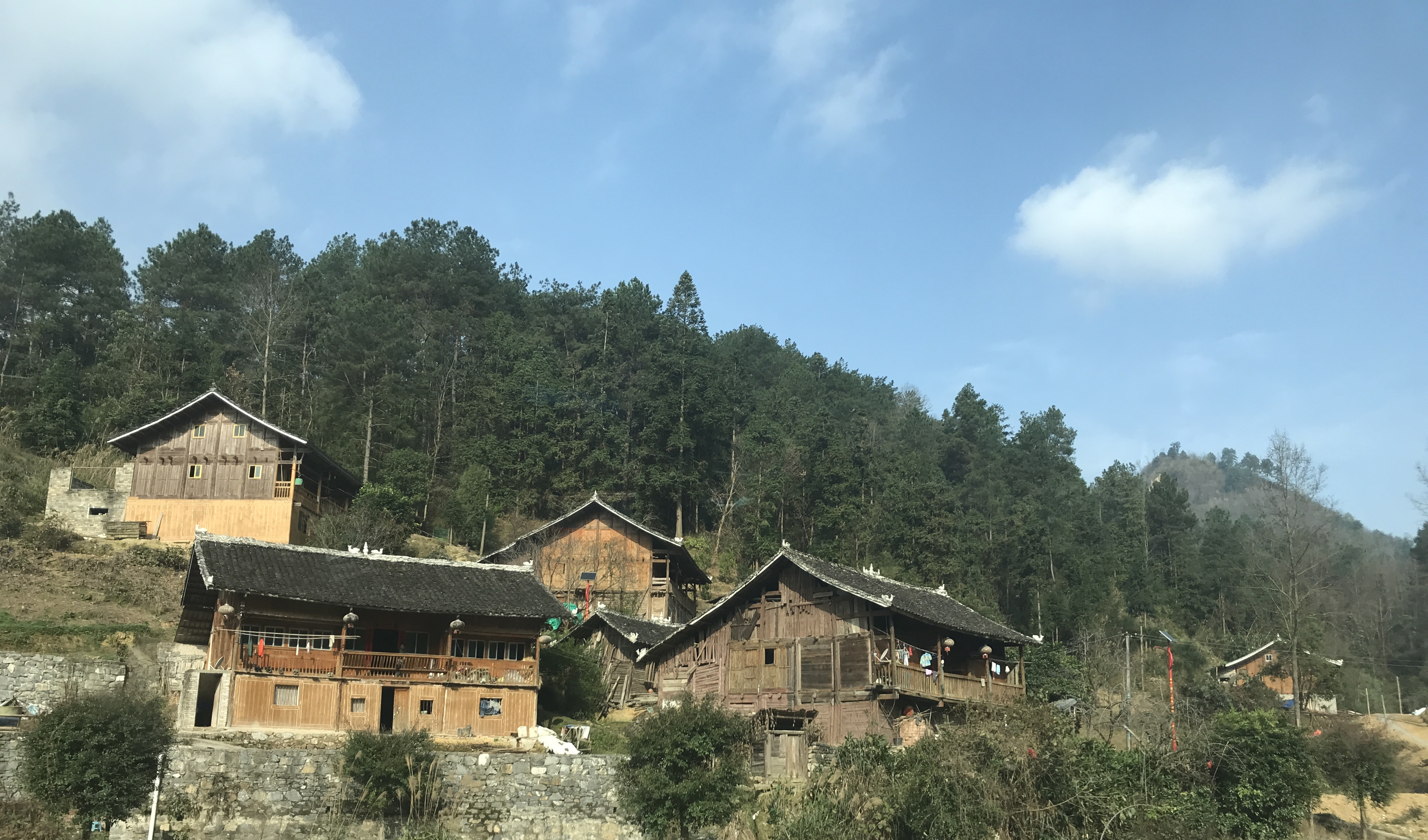
Traditional Shui houses in Sandu

The Sui are organized around family clans. Villages usually have a few hundred inhabitants, most of whom have the same family name (Wei 2003:ix).

Traditional Sui houses are usually made of fir or pine, although today the houses are increasingly made with bricks. There are three main types of traditional Sui housing (Wei 2003:ix):

1. ɣaan2 faaŋ1 (Chinese: ganlan mulou) – The ganlan stilted house, which has two or three stories. The second floor is used for the living quarters whereas the first floor is used primarily as a stable and storage area.
2. ɣaan2 hum5 – The ground house, which has one story.
3. The split level house – a "hanging foot" building called diaojiaolou in Chinese. These houses are built on hillsides, with longer pillars supporting the downhill-facing side of the house, and are called "hanging house" (diaojiao) since the pillars supporting the house are sometimes located outside the walls.

If a woman is widowed, she covers her hair with a fabric of white color for three years. The Sui possess a lunar calendar that is initiated in the ninth lunar month. Their funeral services are elaborate and long ceremonies where animal sacrifices are carried out in honor of the dead. Except for fish, Sui villagers usually refrain from eating meat after the death of a person (Wei 2003:xvi).

== Cuisine ==
The staple food of the Sui people is glutinous rice. Supplementary grains and tubers include corn, wheat, barley, millet, and sweet potatoes. Rice is either steamed in a bamboo steamer or cooked in a covered pot over a low fire. Popular rice-based dishes include ʔjut7 (Chinese: zongzi) and cooked glutinous rice with chrysanthemum and puffed rice (Wei 2003:xiv). Sui women also give glutinous rice to relatives when visiting them.

Fish is one of the most important sources of food. Like the Dong people, many Sui raise carp in village fishponds (Wei 2003:xiv). A popular dish consumed during the summer is a kind of sour broth called lu5 hum3. Sui families also regularly hold communal hot pots. Kippered fish (hum3 mom6), kippered meat (hum3 naan4), and the meat of suckling pigs are also popular. Rice spirits are popular among the Sui, and are also consumed during marriages, funerals, festivals, and building raising events. The Sui are also famed for their jiuqian wine.

== Festivals ==
Festivals include (Wei 2003:xix):

- tsjə1 twə3 (Duan festival) – This harvest festival is similar to the Chinese New Year. It is held from around September (start of the Sui New Year) to November (second month of the Sui calendar). Livestock meat is not eaten during the Sui New Year's Eve (hət7). On New Year's Day (ʁaai3), antiphonal choirs, horse racing, and other festivities are held. Since Sui in different areas celebrate Duan at different times, this festival actually lasts for more than two months when festivities from various locations are combined. A total of five different Duan's are celebrated in the following locations (Wei 2003:xx).
1. Wangsi in Duyun (Pandong) City
2. Malian, Layou, Miaocao, Shuidong in Sandu County
3. Tingpai, Hengfeng, Heyong, Tianxing in Sandu, Libo, Dushan Counties
4. Zhonghe, Dixiang, Jiuqian in Sandu County
5. Sandong, Shuinian, Xingxiang in Sandu County.
- tsjə1 mau4 (Mao festival) – This four-day festival is celebrated by those who do not celebrate the Duan festival. It occurs after the transplanting of rice seedlings on the tenth month of the Sui calendar. Mao Day is celebrated in the Libo County villages of Shuili, Yaoqing, Shuirao, Shuipu, and Yongkang. Antiphonal-style choirs sing traditional Sui love songs during this festival. However, by tradition married women are not allowed to perform in the choirs.
- tsjə1 tseŋ1 (spring festival) – This festival is especially elaborate in the Sandu County locales of Bannan, Shuimei, Yanggong, Zhouqin, and Yang'an. These villages, however, do not celebrate either the Duan or Mao festivals.
- su3 njen2 hi5 (small Sui new year's festival)
- tsjə1 ʔau4 hmai5 ("eat new rice" festival)
- Liuyueliu ("six month six day," or June 6, festival)
- si3 ming2 (Qingming) festival
- Duanwu
- sup8 hi5

The bronze drum is often played during festivals, and singing, dancing, slaughtering livestock for food, and giving thanks to family ancestors are typical of these festivals (Wei 2003:xxii).

== Religion ==
The Sui are mainly polytheists and practice ancestor worship as well. Shamans were traditionally hired to carry out prayers and sacrifices in the houses of those that were sick or close to death. The Sui religion has more than 900 ghosts and gods that can cause both good fortune or misfortune (Wei 2003:xxii). Some deities and legendary figures are also borrowed from Chinese folk religion.

The Sui people have a wide array of taboos and superstitions, such as (Wei 2003:xxiv-xxv):

- During the first thunderclap of the start of the spring season, the ground cannot be plowed for three days. Breaking this taboo would anger the thunder god, resulting in abnormal rain patterns.
- Oaths should not be said when seeds are being sown lest there is crop damage.
- The lusheng should not be played after the seeds are sowed during the beginning of spring, or else the seeds might be blown away later.
- On the first morning of the Duan festival as well as the preceding evening, meats of land animals cannot be eaten. Violating this taboo is seen as disrespect towards ancestors and will result in fewer descendants.
- Dogs should not be killed during festival days.
- On the first day of the Spring Festival, houses should not be cleaned, food should not be cooked, and hair may not be cut. Instead, New Year's Eve leftovers are eaten.
- During a wedding procession, bad luck may result for a couple if the procession chances upon a coffin (couple may die soon), bird crossing the road (couple may be ill soon), thunder (a sorcerer must be invited to drive out ghosts), or a pregnant woman (the bride will be infertile).
- Remarried widows cannot return to their former husbands' villages, and cannot visit their parents' homes for an entire year, or else her parents' village will not prosper.
- Pregnant women cannot bear children in their parents' villages, or else her parents' family and livestock will be harmed.
- After just having a child, if a woman visits another person's village or house, that person will fall ill.
- Members of a clan cannot eat meats of land animals after one of their elders has died. The deceased elder's clothing and personal items cannot fall to the ground, and he must have an odd number of belongings.
- People born on the same day as a recently deceased person should not visit him, or else the dead may take their souls into the grave.
- Names should not be called out when people are being buried, or the dead may take their soul.
- After the death of a male, sows or cows cannot be killed. After the death of a female, horses or bulls cannot be killed.
- Pregnant women and babies should not be buried in areas which receive much sunshine.
- Solar and lunar eclipses, as well as calls of birds, are not liked by the Sui people.

== Population ==
=== Provincial level ===
Distribution by province

Region	Sui	Percentage
Guizhou Province	369,723	90.86%
Guangxi Zhuang Autonomous Province	15,476	3.80%
Yunnan Province	12,533	3.08%
Jiangsu Province	2,775	0.68%
Guangdong Province	1,948	0.48%
Zhejiang Province	1,421	0.38%
Elsewhere	3,026	0.74%

=== By county ===
County-level distribution of the Sui

(Only includes counties or county-equivalents containing >0.5% of China's Sui population.)

Province	Prefecture	County	Sui Population	% of China's Sui Population
Guizhou	Qiannan Buyei and Miao Autonomous Prefecture	Sandu Shui Autonomous County	189.128	46,48 %
Guizhou	Qiannan Buyei and Miao Autonomous Prefecture	Libo	35.407	8,70 %
Guizhou	Qiannan Buyei and Miao Autonomous Prefecture	Rongjiang	33.678	8,28 %
Guizhou	Qiannan Buyei and Miao Autonomous Prefecture	Duyun	32.702	8,04 %
Guizhou	Qiannan Buyei and Miao Autonomous Prefecture	Dushan	26.299	6,46 %
Yunnan	Qujing	Fuyuan	10.567	2,6 %
Guizhou	Qiannan Buyei and Miao Autonomous Prefecture	Danzhai	10.501	2,58 %
Guizhou	Qiannan Buyei and Miao Autonomous Prefecture	Leishan	5.227	1,28 %
Guizhou	Liupanshui	Pan	5.164	1,27 %
Guizhou	Qiannan Buyei and Miao Autonomous Prefecture	Liping	4.710	1,16 %
Guizhou	Liupanshui	Shuicheng	3.875	0,95 %
Guizhou	Qiannan Buyei and Miao Autonomous Prefecture	Congjiang	3.300	0,81 %
Guizhou	Qiannan Buyei and Miao Autonomous Prefecture	Jianhe	3.293	0,81 %
Guangxi Zhuang Autonomous Region	Liuzhou	Rongshui Miao Autonomous County	3.183	0,78 %
Guangxi Zhuang Autonomous Region	Hechi	Nandan	3.083	0,76 %
Guangxi Zhuang Autonomous Region	Hechi	Yizhou	2.160	0,53 %
Guizhou	Bijie	Qianxi	2.102	0,52 %
Others			32.523	7,99 %

== Literature ==
Sui oral literature is rich in myths, songs, and folk tales. The list below is from Wei (2003:xxvi).

- Ancient myths and songs
  - The creation of heaven and earth
  - The origin of humanity
  - The song of creating humans – involving a fight among humans, dragons and tigers
  - The origin of new life – A brother and sister plant a pumpkin from which new life sprouts.
- Legends about individuals
  - The song of Pan Xinjian, a rich magnate
  - The story of Jingui
  - A man named Niu
  - A poor teacher
  - A stone horse who shot out the sun
- Legends about customs
  - Origin of the Duan festival – A brother marries his younger sister, giving rise to the Duan festival.
  - Origin of the Mao festival
  - The planting of the fir upside down
- Legends about scenery
  - Legends on the origins of the Duliujiang River
  - The legend of dinosaurs and the Yueliang (Moon) Mountain
- Folk tales
  - The origin of bronze drums
  - The grape girl
  - Why the tiger hates the buffalo and tiger
  - The eye and the foot
- Life-related songs
  - The song of creating cotton
  - The song of creating grain
  - The song of making wine
  - The song of planting trees
  - The song of suffering
- Custom-related songs
  - The song of the Duan festival
  - The song of mourning
- Love songs
  - The girl lovely as brocade
  - It is hard to miss you
  - Sister will go with the brother together
- Sayings and singing
  - The crane and the crow
  - The sparrow and the thrush

Excerpts of Sui songs can also be found in Fang-Kuei Li's 1977 book Shuihua yanjiu (Research on the Sui language).

== See also ==
- Dong people
- Sui language
- Kam–Sui languages
