= Mak language =

Kra–Dai language spoken in Guizhou, China

Mak
- ʼai3 ma꞉k8
- Native to: China
- Region: Libo County, southern Guizhou
- Ethnicity: 10,000 (2000)
- Native speakers: 5,000 (2007)
- Language family: Kra–Dai: Kam–Sui; Mak

Language codes
- ISO 639-3: mkg
- Glottolog: makc1235
- ELP: Mak (China)

The Mak language (Chinese: 莫语; autonym: ʔai3 maːk8) is a Kam–Sui language spoken in Libo County, Qiannan Prefecture, Guizhou, China. It is spoken mainly in the four townships of Yangfeng (羊/阳风乡, including Dali 大利村 and Xinchang 新场村 dialects), Fangcun (方村), Jialiang (甲良), and Diwo (地莪) in Jialiang District (甲良), Libo County. Mak speakers can also be found in Dushan County. Mak is spoken alongside Ai-Cham and Bouyei. The Mak, also called Mojia (莫家) in Chinese, are officially classified as Bouyei by the Chinese government.

Yang (2000) considers Ai-Cham and Mak to be different dialects of the same language.

The Fangcun dialect was first studied by Fang-Kuei Li in 1942, and the Yangfeng dialect was studied in the 1980s by Dabai Ni of the Minzu University of China. Ni also noted that the Mak people only sing Bouyei folk songs, and that about 5,000 Mak people have shifted to the Bouyei language.

== Dialects ==
Wu et al. (2016) contains a 2,531-item word list of 5 Mak dialects. Wu et al. (2016) also has data tables comparing a few hundred words in Bouyei, Sui, and Mak. The Mak dialects compared, each of which are spoken in their respective townships, are:

- Jialiang 甲良
- Fangcun 方村
- Yangfeng 阳凤
- Boyao 播尧 (Diwo 地莪)
- Jichang 基长
