= Chadong language =

Kam–Sui language spoken in South China

Chadong
- Native to: China
- Region: Northern Guangxi
- Native speakers: 20,000 (2006)
- Language family: Kra–Dai: Kam–Sui; Chadong

Language codes
- ISO 639-3: cdy
- Glottolog: chad1240

The Chadong language (also called Chaodong, Chinese: 茶洞語) is a Kam–Sui language spoken mainly in Chadong Township, Lingui County, Guilin, northeastern Guangxi, China. It is most closely related to the Maonan language. Chadong has only been recently described by Chinese linguist Jinfang Li in the 1990s and 2000s.

Speakers are classified by the Chinese government as ethnic Han.

== History ==
According to inscriptions from the Ming dynasty, Chadong speakers originally came from Qingyuanfu, Nandan, Guangxi, which is located further to the west. They were originally sent to the Guilin area during the Yuan Dynasty in order to suppress local Zhuang and Yao rebellions.

== Genetics ==
Qiongying Deng and Chuan-Chao Wang et al. (2013) have reported that most of the patrilineal and matrilineal gene pools of Chadong are characteristic lineages of southern China. Some ancient Southeast Asian lineages (Y chromosome haplogroups C and D, mtDNA haplogroups M*, M33, M74, and R*) were also identified in Chadong. Chadong shows patterns of the Y chromosome and mtDNA diversities similar to other southern populations, especially Kam-Sui populations, which was actually in accordance with linguistic classification. However, the origin of Chadong seems to be much more complex. Recent gene flow from Sino-Tibetan populations is detected in the patrilineal side of Chadong, such as Y chromosome haplogroups O3a1c-002611, O3a2c1*-M134, and O3a2c1a-M117, probably through the expansion and dispersal of Han Chinese. From the matrilineal aspect, most mtDNA haplogroups of Chadong also clustered together with Hmong-Mien, and obvious gene flow from Tibeto-Burman populations to Chadong was also observed in haplogroup F1a. Taken together, the origin of Chadong are mainly results of an admixture between surrounding populations with the indigenous Kam-Sui populations. Within the Kam-Sui populations, Chadong is more closely related to Mulam than to Maonan, especially from the matrilineal side.

== Distribution ==
In Liangjiang, the Chadong language is less conservative due to influences from Zhuang, Pinghua (Liangjiang Pinghua 两江平话 dialect), and Southwestern Mandarin (Diller, et al. 2008). Chadong is spoken by 18,000 people in 98 villages, while there are 104 ethnic Chadong villages with 20,547 people as of 2000 (Li et al. 2012).

- Chadong 茶洞乡, Lingui County
- Liangjiang 两江镇, Lingui County
- Longjiang 龙江乡, Yongfu County
