= Maonan =

Maonan may refer to:

- Maonan people, ethnic group in China
- Maonan language, spoken by Maonan people
- Maonan District, in Maoming, Guangdong, China
