= Kam–Sui languages =

Language family

Kam–Sui
- 侗水語支; Dong–Shui
- Geographic distribution: eastern Guizhou, western Hunan, and northern Guangxi
- Linguistic classification: Kra–Dai: Kam–Tai ?; Kam–Sui
- Proto-language: Proto-Kam–Sui

Language codes
- Glottolog: kams1241

The Kam–Sui languages (Chinese: 侗水語支; pinyin: Dòng-Shǔi) are a branch of the Kra–Dai languages spoken by the Kam–Sui peoples. They are spoken mainly in eastern Guizhou, western Hunan, and northern Guangxi in southern China. Small pockets of Kam–Sui speakers are also found in northern Vietnam and Laos.

== Classification ==
The Kam–Sui branch includes about a dozen languages. Solnit (1988) considers Lakkia and Biao languages to be sister branches of Kam–Sui, rather than part of Kam–Sui itself.

The best known Kam–Sui languages are Dong (Kam), with over a million speakers, Mulam, Maonan, and Sui. Other Kam–Sui languages include Ai-Cham, Mak, and Tʻen, and Chadong, which is the most recently discovered Kam–Sui language. Yang (2000) considers Ai-Cham and Mak to be dialects of a single language.

=== Thurgood (1988) ===
Graham Thurgood (1988) presents the following tentative classification for the Kam–Sui branch. Chadong, a language that has been described only recently by Chinese linguist Jinfang Li, is also included below. It is most closely related to Maonan. Cao Miao and Naxi Yao, which are closely related to Southern Dong, have also been added from Shi (2015).

- Kam–Sui
  - - Mulam
    - Kam (Dong), Cao Miao, Naxi Yao
  - - Then
    - - - Maonan
        - Chadong
      - Sui
      - - Mak
        - Ai-Cham

=== Norquest (2021) ===
Peter Norquest (2021:234) presents another classification for the Kam–Sui branch.

- Kam-–ui
  - Mulam
  - Northern Kam–Sui
    - Kam
    - Macro-Sui
      - T'en
      - Greater Sui
        - Sui
        - Para-Sui
          - Chadong
          - Maonan
          - Ai-Cham/Mak
            - Ai-Cham
            - Mak

== Demographics ==
Nearly all speakers of Kam–Sui languages originate in the Qiandongnan (Dong) and Qiannan (Sui, Then, Mak, Ai-Cham) Prefectures of Guizhou, as well as the prefecture-level cities of Hechi (Mulam and Maonan) and Guilin (Chadong) in northern Guangxi. Many Kam–Sui speakers have also migrated to farther urban areas such as Guangzhou.

Small groups of Kam and Sui speakers also reside in Tuyên Quang Province, Vietnam, in the villages of Đồng Mộc and Hồng Quang, respectively.

=== By language ===
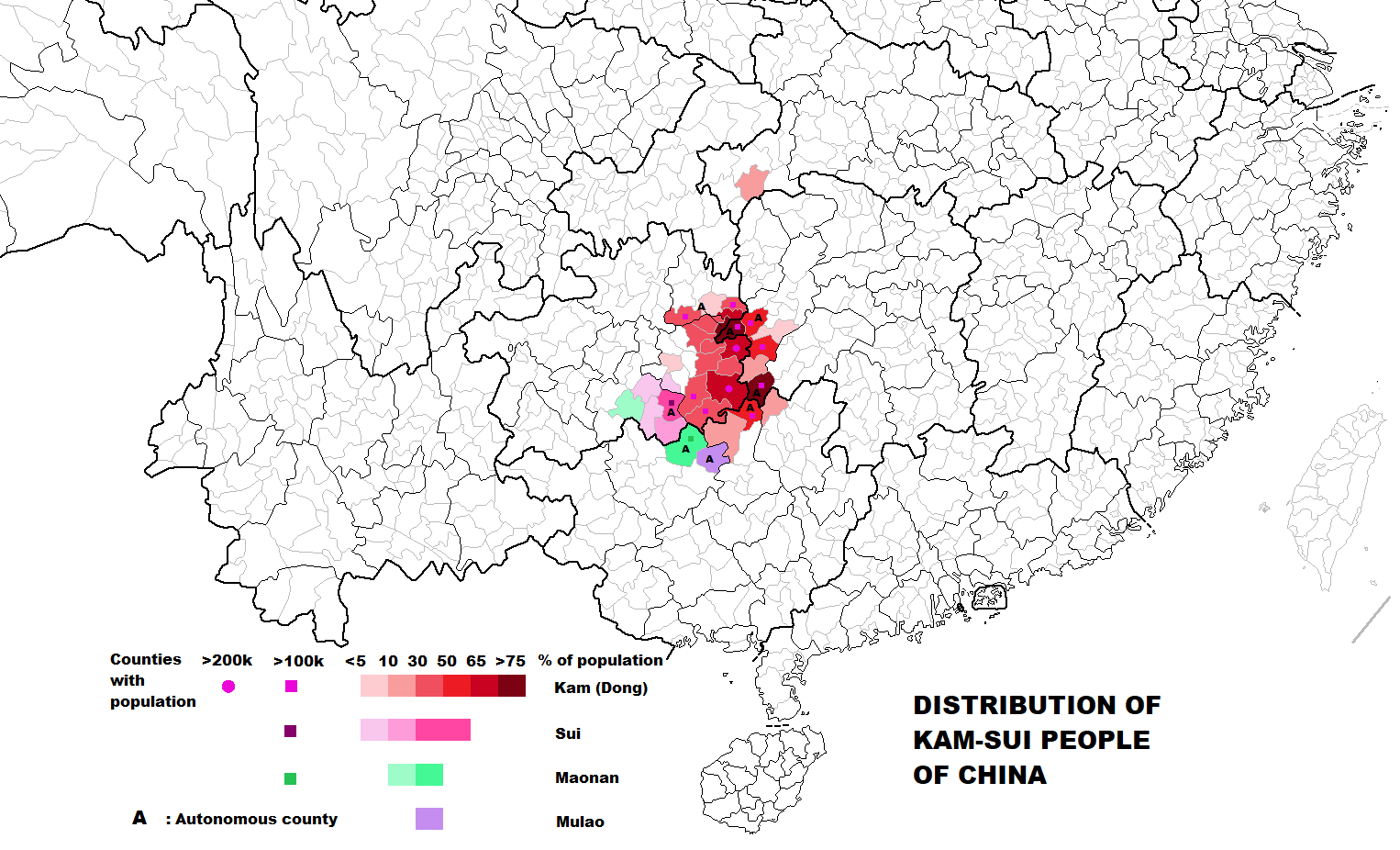
Population distribution of the Dong and other Kam-Sui ethnic groups in China

- Mulam 佬 – Luocheng Mulao Autonomous County 罗城仫佬族自治县, Hechi, northern Guangxi; Qiandongnan Prefecture, southeastern Guizhou
- Dong 侗 – Qiandongnan Prefecture, southeastern Guizhou
- Then 佯僙/佯爷 – Pingtang County 平塘县, Qiannan Prefecture, southern Guizhou
- Maonan 毛南 – Huanjiang Maonan Autonomous County 环江毛南族自治县, Hechi, northern Guangxi
- Chadong 茶洞 – Chadong Township, Lingui County 临桂县, Guilin, northeastern Guangxi
- Sui 水 – Sandu Shui Autonomous County 黔南布依族苗族自治州, Qiannan Prefecture, southern Guizhou
- Mak (Mojia) 莫 – Libo County 荔波县, Qiannan Prefecture, southern Guizhou
- Ai-Cham 锦 – Libo County 荔波县, Qiannan Prefecture, southern Guizhou

=== By location ===
(Listed counterclockwise: east to north to west to south)

- Guizhou
  - Qiandongnan – Dong; 1,500,000 speakers
  - Qiannan
    - Sandu County – Sui; 300,000 speakers
    - Pingtang County – Then; 15,000 speakers
    - Libo County – Mak and Ai-Cham; 10,000 and 2,700 speakers
- Guangxi
  - Hechi
    - Luocheng County – Mulam; 86,000 speakers
    - Huanjiang County – Maonan; 30,000 speakers
  - Guilin (Lingui County) – Chadong; 20,000 speakers

=== By population ===
There is a total of about 2 million Kam–Sui speakers.

The four largest Kam–Sui ethnic groups, the Dong, Shui, Mulao, and Maonan, are officially recognized by the Chinese government. Non-recognized Kam–Sui ethnic groups (Chadong, Then, Mak, Ai-Cham) who can still speak their own languages number less than 50,000.

1. Dong: about 1,500,000 speakers; 1.7 million in 1995
2. Sui: 300,000 speakers
3. Mulam: 86,000 speakers (ethnic population: 200,000)
4. Maonan: 30,000 speakers (ethnic population: 100,000)
5. Chadong: 20,000 speakers
6. Then: 15,000 speakers
7. Mak: 10,000 speakers
8. Ai-Cham: 2,700 speakers

== Other languages ==
The following language varieties are closely related to, or part of, Southern Dong.

- Mjuniang 谬娘 or Cao Miao 草苗 (ISO 639-3: cov): 60,000 (1991) in Liping, Tongdao, and Sanjiang; closely related to Dong. Speakers are classified as ethnic Miao.
- Naxi Yao 那溪瑶 (autonym: mu2 ɲiu1) is spoken by 2,500 people in Naxi Township 那溪瑶族乡, Dongkou County, Hunan Province, China.
- Diao 调 (刁人): 2,000 (1999) in southeastern Guizhou around Liping and Congjiang; may speak Chinese or Dong. Speakers are classified as ethnic Dong. Diao (tjau13) is a Cao Miao subgroup according to Shi (2015:43).

The following peoples may also speak Kam–Sui languages.

- Xialusi 下路司: 3,000 (1999) in southeastern Guizhou; classified as Dong, but their linguistic affiliation is unknown (possibly Kam-Sui). Speakers are classified as ethnic Dong.
- Shui of Yunnan: 6,800 (1990) in Huangnihe 黃泥河 and Gugan 古敢水族乡, Fuyuan County, Yunnan; 490 (1990) in Dahe and Long'an of Yiliang County. In Gugan, there is a village cluster known as the "Five Shui Villages" 水五寨, consisting of Buzhang 补掌, Dongla 咚喇, Reshui 热水, Dazhai 大寨, and Duzhang 都章. It is still spoken in Xinbao Village 新堡村, Laochang Township 老厂乡, Fuyuan County, Yunnan. Also in Dacunzi 大村子, Geyi Township 格宜镇, Xuanwei City. However, these are actually all Northern Tai languages (Bouyei) according to Hsiu (2013).

There are also some languages in southeastern Guizhou, northern Guangxi, and southwestern Hunan that have been influenced by Kam–Sui languages, such as Suantang 酸汤 and Tongdao Pinghua, a Pinghua lect spoken in Tongdao Dong Autonomous County, Hunan. Kam–Sui languages are also in contact with Suantang 酸汤, a Sinitic language spoken by about 80,000 ethnic Miao in Baibu 白布, Dihu 地湖, Dabaozi 大堡子, and Sanqiao 三锹 in Tianzhu, Huitong, and Jing counties (Chen Qiguang 2013:35). Suantang is very similar to New Xiang (新湘语), but is unintelligible with Southwestern Mandarin.

== Reconstruction ==
The Proto-Kam–Sui language is the reconstructed ancestor of the Kam–Sui languages.

== See also ==
- Hunan Kam-Sui languages comparative vocabulary list (Wiktionary)
