= Nuoxi =

Nuoxi may refer to:

- Nuoxi language, a Kam–Sui language of Nuoxi township, Dongkou County, Hunan Province, China
- Nuo opera (nuoxi), popular folk opera in southern China
