= Cao Miao language =

Language of China

Cao Miao
- Native to: China
- Region: Guizhou, Hunan, Guangxi
- Native speakers: (64,000 cited 2000)
- Language family: Kra–Dai: Kam–Sui; Kam; Cao Miao

Language codes
- ISO 639-3: cov
- Glottolog: caom1238

Cao Miao (Chinese: 草苗; autonym: mjiu55 ɲaŋ33) is a variety of Dong (Kam) according to Shi Lin (2012). Dialects include Liushi ("Sixty") Miao 六十苗, Sishi ("Forty") Miao 四十苗, and Ershi ("Twenty") Miao 二十苗 (also known as Flowery Miao 花苗). The Flowery Miao 花苗 do not consider themselves to be Cao Miao 草苗, although their language is similar to Sixty Miao and Forty Miao (Shi 2012).

== Subdivisions ==
There are various ethnic subgroups within Cao Miao (Shi 2015:7).

- Inner Miao 内部苗 (or 内岗苗 / 内堺苗) (kaŋ42 kau31): 2 subgroups
  - Sixty (60) Miao 六十苗 (mjiu55 ljok22 ɕəp22)
  - Forty (40) Miao 四十苗 (mjiu55 si53 ɕəp22), also called Diao 刁族 (tjau13)
- Middle Miao 中部苗 (or 中岗苗 / 中堺苗) (kaŋ42 ta53), also called Twenty (20) Miao 二十苗 (mjiu55 ȵi33 ɕəp22) or Flowery Miao 花苗 (mjiu55 ken53).
- Outer Miao 外部苗 (or 外岗苗 / 外堺苗) (kaŋ42 pak33), also called Old Miao 老苗 or Black Miao 黑苗.

Other ethnolinguistic groups living near the Cao Miao include the Han 汉族, Dong 侗族, Yao 瑶族, Suantang 酸汤人, Sanqiao 三撬人, Tongdao Pinghua speakers, Hakka 客家人, Chuanmin 船民 (a Guibei 桂北 Yue Chinese lect), Naxi 那溪人, Liujia 六甲人, and Liuse 六色人.

== Population ==
There is a total of 58,900 Cao Miao people (Shi 2015:9). The following population statistics are from Shi (2015:9).

By ethnic subgroup:

- 60 Miao: 49,300 people (in 126 villages)
- 20 Miao (Flowery Miao): 5,930 people
- 40 Miao (also called Diao 刁族): 3,620 people (in 18 villages of Liping and Tongdao counties)

By county:

- Liping County, Guizhou: 19,000 people (consisting of 60 Miao, 40 Miao, and 20 Miao)
- Sanjiang Dong Autonomous County, Guangxi: 31,600 people (consisting of only 60 Miao)
- Tongdao Dong Autonomous County, Hunan: 6,800 people (consisting of 60 Miao and 20 Miao, but no 40 Miao)
- Congjiang County, Guizhou: 1,020 people (consisting of only 40 Miao)
- Jingzhou, Hunan: 500+ people (consisting of 20 Miao and Outer Miao)

== Distribution ==
Below are languages and their respective locations studied by Shi Lin (2012).

- Liushi (60) Miao 六十苗: Qifan 起凡 (in Liping), Dagaoping 大高坪 (in Tongdao), Gaoyu 高宇 (in Sanjiang)
- Sishi (40) Miao 四十苗: Tanghua 堂华 (in Tongdao)
- Ershi (20) Miao 二十苗: Kenxi 肯溪 (in Tongdao)
- Southern Dong: Longcheng 陇城 (in Tongdao), Chengyang 程阳 (in Sanjiang)
- Northern Dong: Xiudong 秀洞 (in Jinping), Sanmentang 三门塘 (in Tianzhu)

Ethnic Cao Miao also live in the following townships.

- Sanjiang Dong Autonomous County, Guangxi
  - Tongle 同乐乡
  - Bajiang 八江乡
  - Liangkou 良口乡
  - Yangxi 洋溪乡
  - Dudong 独峒乡
  - Linxi 林溪乡
- Liping County, Guizhou
  - Shuikou 水口镇
  - Zhaoxing 肇兴乡
  - Hongzhou 洪洲镇
  - Long'e 龙额乡
  - Deshun 德顺乡
  - Shunhua 顺化乡
  - Diping 地坪乡
  - Leidong 雷洞乡
- Tongdao Dong Autonomous County, Hunan
  - Dagaoping 大高坪
  - Yatunbao 牙屯堡
  - Dupo 独坡乡

Sishi Miao 四十苗 is spoken in these townships:

- Liping County: Shuikou 水口镇 (including Qifan 起凡村), Zhaoxing 肇兴乡, Yongcong 永从乡
- Rongjiang County: Luoxiang 洛香镇

The Flowery Miao live in Luoxiang 洛香镇, Congjiang County; Guochong 锅冲乡 and Dagaoping 大高坪, Tongdao County; Deshun 德顺乡, Liping County. In Liping County, they are also known as the "Flowery-Clothed Miao" (花衣苗) (Liping County Gazetteer 1989:153). According to Shi Lin (2012), Flowery Miao 花苗 (Ershi Miao 二十苗) is spoken in these townships:

- Liping County: Deshun 德顺乡
- Tongdao County: Guochong 锅冲乡 (including Kenxi 肯溪村), Dagaoping 大高坪乡, Boyang 播阳乡, Xianxi 县溪镇
- Jingzhou County: Xinchang 新厂镇

Other Cao Miao locations include:

- Liping County, Guizhou
  - Tangbi Village 塘婢村, Leidong Township 雷洞乡
  - Jiujue Village 九厥村, Hongzhou Township 洪州镇
  - Guigong 归公, Diping Township 地坪乡
  - Guibai 归白, Diping Township 地坪乡
  - Pingsong 平松, Shuikou Township 水口镇
  - Bashan 八善, Shuikou Township 水口镇
  - Gaoze Village 高泽村, Shunhua Township 顺化乡
- Sanjiang Dong Autonomous County, Guangxi
  - Fenshui 汾水, Bajiang Township 八江乡
  - Gaoya 高亚, Dudong Township 独峒乡
- Rongshui Miao Autonomous County, Guangxi
  - Rongtang Village 荣塘村, Sirong Township 四荣乡

== Bibliography ==
- Shi Lin [石林]. 2015. Xiang-Qian-Gui bianqu de san ge zuqun fangyandao [湘黔桂边区的三个族群方言岛] / Three language varieties of the Hunan-Guizhou-Guangxi border region. Beijing: China Social Sciences Academy Press [中国社会科学出版社]. ISBN 9787516164945
