= Mulam language =

Kam–Sui language spoken in north Guangxi

Mulam
- Native to: China
- Region: Luocheng County, Hechi, Northern Guangxi
- Ethnicity: 210,000 (2000 census)
- Native speakers: 86,000 (2005) < 10,000 monolinguals
- Language family: Kra–Dai: Kam–Sui; Mulam

Language codes
- ISO 639-3: mlm
- Glottolog: mula1253
- ELP: Mulam

The Mulam language (Chinese: 仫佬; pinyin: Mùlǎo) is a Kam–Sui language spoken mainly in Luocheng County, Hechi, Northern Guangxi by the Mulao people. The greatest concentrations are in Dongmen and Siba communes. Their autonym is mu6 lam1. The Mulam also call themselves kjam1, which is probably cognate with lam1 and the Dong people's autonym "Kam" (Wang & Zheng 1980).

== Phonology ==
The Mulam language, like Dong, does not have voiced stops, but does have a phonemic distinction between unvoiced and voiced nasals and laterals. It has a system of eleven distinct vowels. It is a tonal language with ten tones, and 65% of its vocabulary is shared with the Zhuang and Dong languages.

== Dialects ==
The following Mulam dialects are listed in Wang & Zheng (1980) (all of which are spoken in Luocheng Mulao Autonomous County).

- Dongmen 东门镇 (in Dayin 大银, Dafu 大福村, Le'e 勒俄村 etc.); documented in detail by Wang & Zheng (1980)
- Long'an 龙岸镇 (in Liangsi 良泗, etc.)
- Huangjin 黄金镇 (in Zhongjian 中间寨, etc.); documented in Qiu (2004)
- Qiaotou 桥头镇 (in Dongnong 洞弄屯, etc.)
- Siba 四把镇 (in Dawu 大梧, Miao'er 苗儿屯, Shuangzhai 双寨村, etc.); documented in Guangxi (2008)
- Xiali 下里乡 (in Xiecun 谢村, etc.)

The following comparison of Mulam dialects is from Ni Dabai (2010:221-222).

English gloss	Chinese gloss	Qiaotou 桥头	Huangjin 黄金	Siba 四把	Dongmen 东门	Long'an 龙岸
die	死	tai1	tai1	pɣai1	tai1	tai1
medicine	药	ta2	ta2	kɣa2	-	tsa2
intestines	肠子	taːi3	taːi3	kɣaːi3	khɣaːi3	tsaːi3
cloud	云	ma3	ma3	kwa3	kwa3	fa3
bran	细糠	pwa6	pwa6	kwa6	kwa6	fa6
dog	狗	m̥a1	m̥a1	ŋwa1	ŋ̥wa1	m̥a1
hair, fur	毛发	pəm1	pəm1	pɣam1	pɣam1	kjam1
