= CDY =

CDY may be:

- the IATA code of the Cagayan de Sulu Airport in the Philippines
- the station code of the Cartsdyke railway station in Scotland

cdy is the ISO 639-3 code of the Chadong language of China
