= Ai-Cham language =

Kam–Sui language of Guizhou, China

Ai-Cham
- Native to: China
- Region: Qiannan Prefecture, Guizhou Province
- Native speakers: (2,700 cited 2000)
- Language family: Kra–Dai: Kam–Sui; Ai-Cham

Language codes
- ISO 639-3: aih
- Glottolog: aich1238

Ai-Cham (autonym: ʔai33 cam11; Chinese: 锦话) is a Kam–Sui language spoken mainly in Diwo 地莪 and Boyao 播尧 Townships, Jialiang District, Libo County, Qiannan Prefecture, Guizhou, China. Alternative names for the language are Jiamuhua, Jinhua and Atsam. Fang-Kuei Li first distinguished the language in 1943. Nearby languages include Bouyei and Mak. However, Yang (2000) considers Ai-Cham and Mak to be different dialects of an identical language.

Ai-Cham has six tones. Regarded of speaker's nationality, they are being subsumed under "Bouyei" nationality (same with speakers of Mak language).

The mythical patriarch and hero of the Ai-Cham people is the demigod Wu Sangui, who is celebrated during the Ai-Cham New Year.
