= Then language =

Kam–Sui language spoken by Yanghuang people of China

Then
- Yanghuang
- Native to: China
- Region: Pingtang County, southern Guizhou
- Native speakers: 20,000 (2007)
- Language family: Kra–Dai: Kam–Sui; Then

Language codes
- ISO 639-3: tct
- Glottolog: tenn1245
- ELP: T'en

The Then language (Chinese: 佯僙语; alternate spellings: Tʻen and Ten) is a Kam–Sui language spoken in Pingtang and Huishui counties, southern Guizhou. It is spoken by the Yanghuang (佯僙) people, many of whom are officially classified as Maonan by the Chinese government.

== Names ==
The Yanghuang people called themselves ai11 raːu11, except for the Yanghuang of Huishui County, Xiayou District (下游地区), and Xiguan Shangmo (西关上莫), who called themselves ai11 thən35 (Bo 1997). According to the Guizhou Ethnic Gazetteer (2002:846), their autonyms include jiŋ22 zau24 (印绕) and ai22 au24 (哎绕).

"Yanghuang" was mentioned in a Ming Dynasty record, the Dushi Fangyu Jiyao (读史方舆纪要). According to it, "the Man people of Sizhou are Yanghuang, Gelao, Muyao (Mulao), and Miaozhi (Miaozi).

== Phonology ==
Yanghuang of Kapu Township (卡蒲乡) has 71 consonants total, including those with secondary articulations. There are a total of 71 rhymes, 9 vowels, and 8 codas (Bo 1997).

== Dialects ==
Bo (1997:138-139) lists three main dialects of Yanghuang.

- Hedong (河东): spoken by more than 15,000 people, 10,000 of whom are daily users of the language. It is spoken east of the Pingtang River (平塘河) in the townships of Kapu (卡蒲乡) and Zhemi (者密镇), in Pingtang County, as well as in parts of western Dushan County, including Balang village (坝浪寨). Their autonym is ai1 raːu1. This is the representative dialect studied most by Bo (1997).
- Hexi (河西): active speaker population of about 2,000 out of a population of about 10,000 people. It is spoken west of the Pingtang River in the western part of Zhemi Township, Pingtang County, in the villages of Liudongba (六硐坝) and Jiaqing (甲青), and neighboring areas.
- Huishui (惠水): spoken only by elderly people out of a population of about 2,000–3,000 people. Middle-aged and younger people do not speak the Huishui variety of Then anymore. It is spoken in Huishui County. It is spoken around the village of Yaoshao (姚哨), but not in Yaoshao itself. This is the most divergent dialect, and is most heavily influenced by Chinese. Their autonym ai1 thən2. Their ancestors had reportedly migrated from Liudongba (六硐坝) during the 1800s.

Below are some lexical comparisons of Yanghuang dialects from Bo (1997:139-146).

English gloss	Chinese gloss	Hedong	Hexi	Huishui
vegetable	蔬菜	ʔma1	ma1	ma1
female	女	ʔmjɛk9	mjɛk9	mjaːk9
well (water)	井	ʔmwə5	mo5	mu5
year	年	ʔme1	be1	be1
nose	鼻子	ʔnaŋ1	naŋ1	naŋ1
moon	月	ʔnjen1	njen1	njen1
sesame	芝麻	ʔȵa1	ȵa1	ȵa1
nod (head)	点(头)	ʔŋak7		ŋak7
money	钱	prin2	bin2	-tʰin2
stove, hearth	灶	kraːu5	taːu5	tʰaːu5
white	白	pɣaːk8	pwaːk10	paːk8
cliff	山崖	pɣa1, pɣə1	pwa1	pa1
horn (of cattle)	角	pɣaːu2	pwaːu2	paːu2
grass	草	kɣaŋ1	kaŋ1	kaŋ1
light (weight)	轻	ʔza4	tsa4	ja4
heavy	重	ʔzan2, jan2	tsan2	ʔjan2
itch	痒	ʔzam2	tsam2	jəm2
star	星星	ʔzut7	tsut7	jut7
span; bunch	拃	ʔzaːp8	tsjɛp10	jɛp8
zongzi	粽子	ʔzut7	ʔjut7	jut7
mushroom, fungus	菌子	ʔɣa1	ɣa1	ɣə1
long	长	raːi3	raːi3	zaːi3
field	田	ra5	ra5	za5
air	空气	ro6	rəu6	zo6
transplant (seedlings)	插(秧)	ram1	ram1	zam1
wind	风	rəm2	rəm2	zəm2
firewood	柴	rət7	rət7	zət7
bone	骨头	raːk9	raːk9	zaːk9
dark	昏暗	rəp8	rəp8	zəp8; rəp8
soup	汤	riu6		ʑiu6
boat	船	rjɛ1	rjɛ1	zja1
wife	妻	rjɛ4	rje4	zja4
roll (down)	滚	rjɛŋ4	rjɛŋ4	zjaːŋ4
steal	偷	rjɛk8	rjɛk8	zjak8
taro	芋头	rjɛk9	rjɛk9	zjaːk9
name	名字	daːn1	laːn1	laːn1
gallbladder	胆	do5	ləu5	
listen	听	dəi3	ləi3	lei3
shallow	浅	dai5	ləi5	lai5
go to market	赶(场)	daːu3	laːu3	laːu3
forest	森林	dɔŋ1	lɔŋ1	loŋ1
winnowing basket	簸箕	dɔŋ3	lɔŋ3	loŋ3
deaf	聋	dak7	lak7	lak7
navel	肚脐	djɛ1		lja1
eye	眼睛	la1	da1	da1
steam, cook	蒸	laːu3	daːu3	daːu3
moss	青苔	lau1	dau1	dau1
pond	水塘	lam1	dam1	dam1
see	看见	lo3	dəu3	do3
wood shavings	刨花	laːk9	daːk9	daːk9
fragrant	香	laːŋ1	daːŋ1	
tian que	田缺	laːŋ3		daːŋ3
bamboo strips	竹篾	luk7	dok7	
river	河	njɛ2	njɛ2	nja2
tree (classifier)	棵	pjɛ2	pjɛ2	pja2
hand	手	mjɛ2	mjɛ2	mja2
walk	走	sjɛm3	sjɛm3	sjaːm3
housefly	蝇子	tsjɛm5	tsjɛm5	tsjaːm5
sunlight	阳光	ljɛŋ1	ljɛŋ1	ljaːŋ1
ditch	水渠	mjɛŋ2		mjaːŋ2
magpie	喜鹊	ȶʰɛk9	sjɛk9	ɕaːk9
belly	肚子	lɔŋ2	lɔŋ2	loŋ2
finger	手指	tɔŋ1	tɔŋ1	toŋ1
ripe, cooked	熟	sɔk8	sɔk8	sok8
fall (intr.)	落	tɔk9	tɔk9	tok9
bird	鸟	ʔnɔk9	nɔk9	nok9
liver	肝	tap7	tap7	tap7
select; carry	挑	taːp9	taːp9	taːp9
ten	十	sip8	sip8	sip8
child	子女	laːk10	laːk8	laːk8
congratulate	贺喜	bek10	bek8	bjek8
sky	天	ʔmun1	mun1	mən1
marriage	姻	wan2	wan2	van2
fire	火	vi2	vi2	vi2
body	身体	rən1	rən1	zən1
one	一	to2	to2	to2
Chinese bayberry	杨梅	tʰaːi6	tʰaːi6	tʰaːi6
buffalo	水牛	wi2	wi2	wi2
rust	锈	raːk10	raːk10	mai4
overflow	溢	ron4	ron4	tʰiu5
cogon grass	茅草	ja2	ja2	zaːp8
squeeze	挤	nɛn3	nɛn3	ȵat8
squat, kneel	蹲	kʰu6	kʰu6	pok8
tremble	颤抖	taːn2	taːn2	ən1
mole (of skin)	痦子	mak8	mak8	don1
pig food	猪食	kaːm1	kaːm1	
dog	狗	ma1	ma1	kə0 va1
peel (skin)	剥(皮)	kwa3	kwa3	tʰot9
cast, mold	浇铸	tʰaːu3	tʰaːu3	toi3
tickle	搔痒	tsjɛt10	ʔjɛt8	koi6
still (adverb)	还	ʔnaŋ1	naŋ1	voŋ2
mountain (earth)	土山	liŋ4	nu2	niu2
big	大	laːu4	maːk9	maːk9
marry (of man)	娶	lət7	tʰep9	tʰep9
rest	休息	ljak8	dja5	dja5
sharp	锋利	nim1	raːi2	zaːi2
have	有	ʔnaŋ1	mei2	me2
pheasant	野鸡	ʔnɔk9 rwa1	kok9	kaːi5 ke1
fish scale	鳞	kɛt9	tep9	kʰwaːŋ1
wrinkle (n.)	皱纹	tiu3	ȵap7	tsuŋ3
trip	绊	kɛk9	mit7	kʰam5
I	我	jiu2	jiu2	jiu2
you (sg.)	你	ȵa2	ȵa2	ȵa2
he	他	mən2	mən2	mu5
we (incl.)	咱们	raːu1	raːu1	zaːu1
we (excl.)	我们	ljeu1, diu1	diu1	zaːu1
you (pl.)	你们	sjeu1	siu1	si1
they	他们	tjeu1	tiu1	mən2
bull, male cattle	公牛	tak8 wi2	wi2 tak8	wi2 tak8
sow, female pig	母猪	nei4 məu5	məu5 nəi4	məu5 nəi4
rooster	公鸡	tʰai3 kaːi5	kaːi5 tʰai3	kaːi5 tʰai3
male dog	公狗	tak8 ma1	ma1 tak8	ma1 tak8
