= Sui language =

Tai–Kadai language spoken by the Sui people of Guizhou, China

Sui
- Suī
- Native to: China, Vietnam
- Region: Guizhou (93%), Guangxi, Yunnan
- Ethnicity: Sui
- Native speakers: 300,000 (2023)
- Language family: Kra–Dai: Kam–Sui; Sui
- Writing system: Latin script, Sui script, Chinese characters

Language codes
- ISO 639-3: swi
- Glottolog: suii1243
- Linguasphere: 47-ABB-b

The Sui language (simplified Chinese: 水语; traditional Chinese: 水語; pinyin: Shuǐyǔ) is a Kam–Sui language spoken by the Sui people of Guizhou province in China. According to Ethnologue, it was spoken by around 300,000 people in 2007. Sui is also unique for its rich inventory of consonants, with the Sandong (三洞) dialect having as many as 70 consonants. The language also has its own script, known as "Shuishu" (水書) in Chinese, which is used for ritual purposes.

Some regionally atypical features of the Sui language include voiceless nasals (hm, hn), palatal stops, postvelar stops, prenasalized stops (mb, nd), and pre-glottalized stops and nasals (i.e. ʔb, ʔm).

== Dialects ==
=== China ===
The Sui language is divided into three dialects with minor differences (Wei & Edmondson 2008).

- Sandong 三洞, spoken by 90% of Sui speakers.
  - Sandu Shui Autonomous County: Sāndòng 三洞, Shǔilóng 水龙, Zhōnghé 中和, Miáocǎo 苗草, Bàjiē 坝街, Jiǎdǎo 甲倒, Shíqí 石奇, Jiāróng 佳荣, Héngfēng 恒丰, Zhōuqín 周覃, Jiǔqiān 九仟, Tángzhōu 塘州, Yángméng 阳蒙
  - Libo County: Yáoqìng 瑶庆
  - Dushan County: Wēnquán 温泉 (Tiānxīng 天星)
  - Rongjiang County
  - Congjiang County
- Yang'an 阳安
  - Sandu Shui Autonomous County: Yáng'ān 阳安, Yángluò 羊洛, Línqiáo 林桥
  - Dushan County: Dǒngmiǎo 董渺
- Pandong 潘洞
  - Duyun City: Pāndòng 潘洞
  - Dushan County: Wēngtái 翁台

In Guangxi, Sui is spoken by about 10,000 people in Rongshui County and 1,900 in Nandan County (e.g., in Longmazhuang 龙马庄 of Liuzhai Township 六寨镇, with the autonym pu44 sui33).

However, Castro (2011) proposes that the Sandong dialect is divided further into two more subdialects, Central (spoken in Sandu County) and Southern (spoken in Libo County). Southern Sui speakers are also culturally distinguished by their celebration of the Maox festival instead of the Dwac festival, which is celebrated by all other Sui groups. Below are some villages representative of Central and Southern Sui. Castro & Pan (2014) add two more dialects to the Sandong cluster, namely Eastern and Western.

Castro & Pan (2014) consider Sandong to consist of four subdialects, namely Eastern, Western, Central, and Southern, giving the following datapoints.

- Sandong 三洞
  - Eastern
    - Zenlei, Dujiang town, Sandu County (三都县都江镇怎累村上村)
    - Dangmin, Renli township, Rongjiang County (榕江县仁里水族乡党民村)
    - Guyi, Sanjiang township, Rongjiang County (榕江县三江水族乡故衣村上寨)
  - Western
    - Meiyu, Tangzhou township, Sandu County (三都县塘州乡枚育村)
    - Xinyang, Tingpai town, Sandu County (三都县廷牌镇新仰村)
    - Antang, Tangzhou township, Sandu County (三都县塘州乡安塘村)
  - Central
    - Shuigen, Sandong township, Sandu County (三都县三洞乡水根村)
    - Hezhai, Zhonghe town, Sandu County (三都县中和镇中和村和寨)
  - Southern
    - Guchang, Jiuqian town, Sandu County (三都县九阡镇姑偿村)
    - Laliang, Jiarong town, Libo County (荔波县佳荣镇拉亮村)
    - Shuiyao village, Shuiyao township, Libo County (荔波县水尧水族乡水尧村)
    - Shuiwei village, Shuiwei township, Rongjiang County (榕江县水尾水族乡水尾村)
- Yang'an 阳安
  - Banliang, Tangzhou township, Sandu County (三都县塘州乡板良村)
  - Tangnian, Tanglian village, Benzhai township, Dushan County (独山县本寨水族乡塘联村塘年寨)
- Pandong 潘洞
  - Gaorong, Jiaoli township, Sandu County (三都县交梨乡高戎村)
  - Pandong, Yanghe township, Duyun City (都匀市阳和水族乡潘洞村)

Using computational phylogenetics, Castro & Pan (2014) classify the Sui dialects as follows. Pandong was the first branch to split off from Proto-Sui, followed by Yang'an and then Sandong. Within Sandong, the Southern dialect is the most divergent.

- Sui
  - Pandong 潘洞 dialect
  - (branch)
    - Yang'an 阳安 dialect
    - Sandong 三洞 dialect
      - Southern
      - (core)
        - Western, Central
        - Eastern

=== Vietnam ===
Sui is also spoken in Hồng Quang Village, Chiêm Hoá District, Tuyên Quang Province (62 km northwest of Chiêm Hóa township). In Vietnam, the Sui people (Vietnamese: Thủy) are officially classified with the Pà Thẻn people. The Sui numbered only 55 people as of the 1982 Vietnamese census, and numbered about 100 people as of 2001. Since Pa-Hng (Pà Thẻn) and Tày are also spoken in Hồng Quang Village, many Sui are also fluent in those two languages.

The elderly Sui people of Hồng Quang claim that 8 Sui families had migrated to Vietnam from China 100 to 200 years ago, 2 of which have now already assimilated into other ethnic groups. Edmondson & Gregerson (2001) have found that the Sui dialect of Hồng Quang is most similar to the Sandong 三洞 dialect of Sui as spoken in Shǔilóng 水龙, Sandu Shui Autonomous County, Guizhou.

== Phonology ==
=== Vowels ===
Monophthongs
		Front	Central	Back
Close		i		u
Mid		e	ə	o
Open	short		a	
Open	long		aː	

Diphthongs
		Front	Back
Close		ui̯	iu̯
Mid		oi̯	eu̯
Open	short	ai̯	au̯
Open	long	aːi̯	aːu̯

=== Consonants ===
Consonants in parentheses were reported by the 1956 dialectology study Shuiyu diaocha baogao, but not in Li Fang Kuei's 1942 research in Libo County. Labialized velars were not listed separately, so it's not clear if they also existed.

			Labial	Alveolar	(Alveolo-) palatal	Velar		Uvular	Glottal
			Labial	Alveolar	(Alveolo-) palatal	plain	labial	Uvular	Glottal
Nasal	voiceless		m̥	n̥	ɲ̟̊	ŋ̊	ŋ̊ʷ		
Nasal	voiced	plain	m	n	ɲ̟	ŋ	ŋʷ		
Nasal	voiced	preglottal	ˀm	ˀn	ˀɲ̟	ˀŋ			
Plosive	voiceless	tenuis	p	t	t̠ʲ	k	kʷ	q	ʔ
Plosive	voiceless	aspirated	pʰ	tʰ	t̠ʲʰ	kʰ	kʷʰ	qʰ	
Plosive	voiced	prenasal	ᵐb	ⁿd		(ɡ)	(gʷ)	(ɢ)	
Plosive	voiced	preglottal	ˀb	ˀd		(ˀɡ)			
Affricate	tenuis			ts					
Affricate	aspirated			tsʰ					
Fricative	voiceless		f ~ ɸ	s	ɕ	x			h
Fricative	voiced			z	(ʑ)				
Approximant	plain		ʋ ~ w	l	j	ɣ		ʁ	
Approximant	preglottal				ˀj	ˀɣ	ˀw		

- /x/ only occurs phonemically in the Southern Sui dialects.
- /w/ is classed as a labial because it can be followed by a glide /j/.
- /j/ can also be pronounced as a voiced fricative [ʑ].
- The prenasalized stops have very short nasalization.
- The voiceless nasals are actually voiced at the end, as most voiceless nasals are around the world.
- The preglottalized stops are truly preglottalized, not ejective or creaky voiced.
- The gammas have been described as fricatives, but here have been placed in the approximant row because of the preglottalized phone and the frequent ambiguity between dorsal fricatives and approximants.

In several locations in the Sandu Sui Autonomous County, the preglottalized consonants and the voiceless sonorants do not exist, having merged with the other consonants.

=== Tones ===
There are six or seven tones, reduced to two in checked syllables. The tones of the Sandu Sui Autonomous County, Guizhou, listed by conventional tone numbers, are provided below, with numerical Chao tone equivalents also given in between slashes.

Sui tones
#	Sandu Sui county	
#	description	IPA
1	low rising	˩˧ /13/
2	low falling	˧˩ /31/
3	mid	˧ /33/
4	high falling	˥˧ /53/
5	high rising	˧˥ /35/
6	6a: high (6b: mid rising)	6a: ˥ /55/ (6b: ˨˦ /24/)
7	checked high (checked high rising)	˥C /55C/ (long: ˧˥C /35C/)
8	checked falling	˦˨C /42C/

The alternate checked tone 7 is found on the long vowel /aːC/. Tone 8 is somewhat variable on a long vowel, appearing in different locations either higher or lower than the short allophone, but always falling, as in tones 2 and 4.

In some villages, tone 6 is two phonemes, /˨˦/ in native words and /˥/ in Chinese loanwords. In the village of Ngam, Libo county, tone 1 is low [˩], the others as above.

=== Phonotactics ===
Syllable structure is CjVC^{T}, where /j/ may follow one of the labial or coronal consonants, other than /m̥ ʔm/ (and /ʔw/) and the affricates. (/tsj, tsʰj, tsw, tsʰw/ occur in recent Chinese loans.) All syllables start with a consonant, unless initial [ʔ] is analyzed as phonetic detail of an initial vowel. The final C is one of /p t k m n ŋ/. Final plosives are both unphonated (have glottal closure) and are unreleased; the coronal is apical alveolar: [ʔ͡p̚, ʔ͡t̚, ʔ͡k̚]. They reduce the tonic possibilities to two, "tones" 7 or 8.

== Script ==
The Sui script (Sui: le1 sui3, Simplified Chinese: 水书, Traditional Chinese: 水書, Pinyin: Shuǐshū) is a logographic writing system with some pictographic characters that can be used to write the Sui language (Wei 2003:xxix). However, traditionally only shamans were familiar with the writing system, and it is not utilized for everyday use by ordinary Sui people. This system is used for geomancy and divination purposes. There are at least 500 different Sui characters, known as le1 sui3 in the Sui language (Wei 2003:xxix). According to tradition, these characters were created by ljok8 to2 qong5 (Chinese Lù Duógōng 陸鐸公). Some of these characters are pictorial representations, such as of a bird or a fish, and a few are schematic representations of a characteristic quality, such a snail represented by a drawing of an inward curving spiral. Many of these characters appear to be borrowings from Chinese characters and are written backwards, apparently for increased supernatural power.

Today, the Sui people use written Chinese for their daily activities.

=== Latin script ===
The Sui Latin alphabet was developed in 1956-1957, but was not implemented. In 1986, a new version of the Sui Latin alphabet was developed in Sandu Shui Autonomous County. Several books were published in it. It is also taught as an optional subject in schools.

Letters (with IPA pronunciation):

- A a (/a/)
- B b (/p/)
- By by (/pʲ/)
- C c (/tsʰ/)
- D d (/t/)
- Dv dv (/tʷ/)
- Dy dy (/tʲ/)
- E e (/ə/)
- Ee ee (/e/)
- F f (/f/)
- Fy fy (/fʲ/)
- G g (/k/)
- Gh gh (/q/)
- Gn gn (/ɲ/)
- Gv gv (/kʷ/)
- H h (/h/)
- Hg hg (/ʁ/)
- Hgn hgn (/ɲ̥/)
- Hm hm (/m̥/)
- Hmy hmy (/m̥ʲ/)
- Hn hn (/n̥/)
- Hng hng (/ŋ̊/)
- Hny hny (/n̥ʲ/)
- I i (/i/)
- J j (/tɕ/)
- K k (/kʰ/)
- Kv kv (/kʷʰ/)
- L l (/l/)
- Lv lv (/lʷ/)
- Ly (/lʲ/)
- M m (/m/)
- Mb mb (/mb/)
- Mby mby (/mbʲ/)
- My my (/mʲ/)
- N n (/n/)
- Nd nd (/nd/)
- Ndv ndv (/ndʷ/)
- Ndy ndy (/ndʲ/)
- Ng ng (/ŋ/)
- Ngv ngv (/ŋʷ/)
- Ny ny (/nʲ/)
- O o (/o/)
- P p (/pʰ/)
- Py py (/pʰʲ/)
- Q q (/tɕʰ/)
- Qb qb (/ʔb/)
- Qby qby (/ʔbʲ/)
- Qd qd (/ʔd/)
- Qdv qdv (/ʔdʷ/)
- Qdy qdy (/ʔdʲ/)
- Qgn qgn (/ʔɲ/)
- Qm qm (/ʔm/)
- Qn qn (/ʔn/)
- Qng qng (/ʔŋ/)
- Qngv qngv (/ʔŋʷ/)
- Qny qny (/ʔnʲ/)
- Qw qw (/ʔw/)
- Qy qy (/ʔj/)
- Qxg qxg (/ʔɣ/)
- R r (/z/)
- S s (/s/)
- Sv sv (/sʷ/)
- Sy sy (/sʲ/)
- T t (/tʰ/)
- Ty ty (/tʲʰ/)
- U u (/u/)
- W w (/w/)
- Wy wy (/wʲ/)
- X x (/ɕ/)
- Xg xg (/ɣ/)
- Y y (/j/)
- Z z (/ts/)
- Zy zy (/tsʲ/)

Tones are marked with the following letters:

- Low falling: l
- Mid rising: z
- Mid: c
- High rising: x
- High and mid-falling: s
- Low: h
- Mid-high and mid low: unmarked.
