= Maonan language =

Kam–Sui language spoken in China

Maonan
- Native to: China
- Region: Northern Guangxi, Southern Guizhou
- Ethnicity: 107,000 (2000)
- Native speakers: 30,000 (2005)
- Language family: Kra–Dai: Kam–Sui; Maonan

Language codes
- ISO 639-3: mmd
- Glottolog: maon1241
- ELP: Maonan
- Maonan is classified as Vulnerable by the UNESCO Atlas of the World's Languages in Danger

The Maonan language (Chinese: 毛南语; pinyin: Máonán yǔ) is a Kam–Sui language spoken mainly in China by the Maonan people, specifically in northern Guangxi and southern Guizhou. Huanjiang Maonan Autonomous County, Hechi, northern Guangxi, holds a concentrated number of speakers.

== Demographics ==
Approximately half of all Maonan people are capable of speaking Maonan. In addition to this, many Maonan also speak Chinese or a Zhuang language. About a third of all people who self-identify as Maonan are concentrated in the southern Guizhou province. They speak a mutually unintelligible dialect commonly called Yanghuang, which is more commonly known as the Then language in Western literature. Maonan used Chinese characters at some point in the past.

Other than Huanjiang Maonan Autonomous County in Guangxi, Maonan is also spoken in the following locations.

- Nandan County, Guangxi
- Du'an Yao Autonomous County, Guangxi
- Yizhou, Guangxi
- Libo County, Guizhou
- Pingtang County, Guizhou

== Phonology ==
Maonan is a tonal language with 8 tones (Lu 2008:90–91), featuring an SVO clause construction (Lu 2008:169). (See Proto-Tai language § Tones for an explanation of the tone numbers.) For example:

man2 na4 kʰaːu3
3SG eat wine
"S/He drinks wine."

man2 paːi1 hɯ1
3SG go market
"S/He goes to the market."

== Syntax ==
Maonan displays a head-first modification structure, i.e. the modifier occurring after the word being modified (Lu 2008:170). For example:

kʰaːu3 ɦu4ljaːŋ4
wine broomcorn
"broomcorn wine"

mu5 laːu4
pig big
"big pig"

nok7 vin1
bird fly
"flying bird"

Occasionally, a head-final modification structure is also possible with the involvement of a possessive particle (P.P.) ti^{5}. For example:

jaːn1 ndaːu1 ti5 bo4
house/family 1PL POSS.PTCL buffalo
"Our family's buffalo"

(cf. the more common bo^{4} jaːn^{1} ndaːu^{1}) (Lu 2008:173-174).

== Writing system ==
The Maonan writing system was established in 2010. It is based on 26 Latin letters to facilitate standard keyboard input. The letters z, j, x, s, h are attached to the end of each syllable as tonal markers, representing tones 2, 3, 4, 5, 6 respectively. The first tone is not written. Syllables ending in -b, -d, -g, -p, -t, -k do not distinguish tone either. The writing system is being used among a limited number of Maonan intellectuals. For example:

Writing: Hez suen ngz nhieij hux gangs deih tuet mad
IPA: ɦe² suːn¹ ŋ² ˀnjai³ ɦu⁴ kaːŋ⁵ dai⁶ tuːt⁷' maːt⁸'
Gloss: 1SG teach 2SG buy rice stitch bag {take off} sock
Meaning: "I teach you (how) to buy rice, stitch bags and take off (your) socks."

== See also ==
- Maonan people
