= Kam language =

Kam–Sui language of China's Dong people

Kam
- Gaeml
- Native to: China
- Region: Guizhou, Hunan, Guangxi
- Ethnicity: Kam people
- Native speakers: 1.5 million (2003)
- Language family: Kra–Dai: Kam–Sui; Kam
- Writing system: Latin

Language codes
- ISO 639-3: Variously: doc – Northern Dong kmc – Southern Dong cov – Cao Miao
- Glottolog: kami1255

The Kam or Gam language (lix Gaeml), also known as Dong (Chinese: 侗语; pinyin: Dòngyǔ), is a Kam–Sui language spoken by the Dong people. Ethnologue distinguishes three Kam varieties as separate but closely related languages.

== Demographics ==
=== Southern Dong ===
Almost 1.5 million speakers of Southern Dong were counted in the 1990 language census, from a total of 2.5 million people in the Dong ethnic group. The Southern Dong live primarily in Rongjiang, Jinping, Liping, Zhenyuan, and Congjiang counties in Guizhou Province; Longsheng, Sanjiang, and Rongshui counties in northeastern Guangxi; and Tongdao County in Hunan Province. Two Dong villages are also located in northern Vietnam, although only one individual in Vietnam is still able to speak Dong.

== Dialects ==
The Kam language can be divided into two major subdivisions: Southern Kam and Northern Kam. Northern Kam displays more Chinese influence and lacks vowel length contrast, while Southern Kam is more conservative. Language varieties closely related to or part of Kam include Cao Miao and Naxi Yao. A northern Pinghua variety called Tongdao Pinghua, spoken in Tongdao County, Hunan, has also been significantly influenced by Kam.

Southern Kam

- First lectal area: Róngjiāng Zhānglǔ (榕江县章鲁村), Lípíng Hóngzhōu (黎平县洪州镇), Jǐnpíng Qǐméng (锦屏县启蒙镇) in Guizhou; Tōngdào (通道县) in Hunan; Longsheng (龙胜县) and Sanjiang Dudong (三江侗族自治县独峒乡) in Guangxi
- Second lectal area: Lípíng Shuǐkǒu (黎平县水口镇), Cóngjiāng Guàndòng (从江县贯洞镇), Róngjiāng Píngjiāng (榕江县平江乡) in Guizhou; Sānjiāng Hélǐ (三江侗族自治县和里村) in Guangxi
- Third lectal area: Zhènyuǎn Bàojīng (镇远县报京乡) in Guizhou
- Fourth lectal area: Róngshuǐ (融水苗族自治县) in Guangxi

Northern Kam

- First lectal area: Tiānzhù Shídòng (天柱县石洞镇), Sānsuì Kuǎnchǎng (三穗县款场), Jiànhé Xiǎoguǎng (剑河县小广侗寨) in Guizhou; also Jǐnpíng Jiǔzhài (锦屏县九寨) in Guizhou
- Second lectal area: Tiānzhù Zhǔxī (天柱县注溪乡) in Guizhou
- Third lectal area: Jǐnpíng Dàtóng (锦屏县大同乡) in Guizhou

Long (2012:19-20) classifies the Kam lectal areas (dialects) as follows.

Southern Kam

- Lectal area 1
  - Chejiang, Rongjiang County 榕江县车江
  - Longcheng, Tongdao County 通道县陇城
  - Pingdeng, Longsheng County 龙胜县平等
  - Chengyang, Sanjiang County 三江县程阳
  - Hongzhou, Liping County 黎平县洪州
- Lectal area 2
  - Zhaihao, Rongjiang County 榕江县寨蒿
  - Shuikou, Liping County 黎平县水口
  - Guidong, Congjiang County 从江县贵洞
  - Heli, Sanjiang County 三江县和里
- Lectal area 3
  - Zhaihuai, Rongshui County 融水县寨怀
- Lectal area 4
  - Pindong, Rongshui County 融水县聘洞

Northern Kam

- Lectal area 1 (Highland Dong 高坡侗)
  - Shidong, Tianzhu County 天柱县石洞
  - Kuanchang, Sansui County 三穗县款场
  - Jiuzhai, Jinping County 锦屏县九寨
  - Xiaoguang, Jianhe County 剑河县小广
- Lectal area 2 (River Dong 河边侗)
  - Datong, Jinping County 锦屏县大同
  - Sanmentang, Tianzhu County 天柱县三门塘
  - Lannichong, Jingzhou County 靖州县烂泥冲
- Lectal area 3
  - Zhuxi, Tianzhu County 天柱县注溪
  - Zhongzhai, Xinhuang County 新晃县中寨
- Lectal area 4
  - Qimeng, Jinping County 锦屏县启蒙
- Lectal area 5
  - Baojing, Zhenyuan County 镇远县抱京

In Congjiang County, Dong consists of three dialects: Jiudong 九洞 (similar to Chejiang 车江 Dong), Liudong 六洞 (similar to Liping 黎平 Dong), and another dialect spoken in Xishan 西山, Bingmei 丙梅, and Guandong 贯洞 (similar to Sanjiang 三江 Dong) (Congjiang County Gazetteer 1999:109).

In Suining County, Hunan, Dong is spoken in Lianfeng 联丰 (including Duolong 多龙村), Huangsangping 黄桑坪, Le'anpu 乐安铺, and other nearby locations. In Chengbu County, Hunan, Dong is spoken in Yanzhai 岩寨, Chang'anying 长安营, and Jiangtousi 江头司.

Kam is also spoken in the single village of Đồng Mộc, Trung Sơn Commune, Yên Sơn District, Tuyên Quang Province, northern Vietnam, where there are about 35 Kam people (Edmondson & Gregerson 2001). The Kam of Đồng Mộc had migrated to Vietnam from China about 150 years ago. The Kam variety spoken in Đồng Mộc is most similar to that of Lípíng Shuǐkǒu (黎平县水口镇) in southeastern Guizhou.

In China, a total of seven counties designated as Dong Autonomous Counties (侗族自治县).

- Yuping Dong Autonomous County, Guizhou
- Sanjiang Dong Autonomous County, Guangxi
- Longsheng Various Nationalities Autonomous County, Guangxi
- Xinhuang Dong Autonomous County, Hunan
- Zhijiang Dong Autonomous County, Hunan
- Jingzhou Miao and Dong Autonomous County, Hunan
- Tongdao Dong Autonomous County, Hunan

=== Others ===
According to the Shaoyang Prefecture Gazetteer (1997), language varieties closely related to Southern Kam are spoken in Naxi 那溪, Dongkou County (which had 4,280 ethnic Yao in 1982 (Chen 2013:39)) and Lianmin 联民, Suining County. However, they are officially classified by the Chinese government as ethnic Yao, not Dong. Chen Qiguang (2013:39) reports that the ancestors of Naxihua 那溪话 speakers had migrated to their current location from Tianzhu, Liping, and Yuping counties of southeastern Guizhou during the early 15th century.

== Phonology and orthography ==
Kam has two main orthographies: the Chinese academic developed system and the independently developed system by Ngo Van Lyong for Southern Kam as spoken in Rongjiang. The Chinese system is most commonly used by linguists and has similarities to other Chinese Kra–Dai language orthographies (such as Zhuang). The Ngo Van Lyong system was inspired by the Vietnamese alphabet and is made for speakers and learners.

While the Chinese system is the most well known, most Kam speakers are not literate in Kam.

=== Initials ===
		Labial		Alveolar	(Alveolo-) palatal	Velar		Glottal
		plain	pal.	Alveolar	(Alveolo-) palatal	plain	lab.	Glottal
Nasal		m	mʲ	n	nʲ	ŋ	ŋʷ	
Stop/ Affricate	voiceless	p	pʲ	t	tɕ	k	kʷ	
Stop/ Affricate	aspirated	pʰ	pʲʰ	tʰ	tɕʰ	kʰ	kʷʰ	
Fricative				s	ɕ			h
Approximant	central	w	wʲ		j			
Approximant	lateral			l	lʲ			

The Chinese orthography for Kam orthography has 32 syllable-initial consonants; seven of them (tʃ-, tʃʰ-, ʃ-, ɻ-, f-, ts- and tsʰ-) only occur in recent loanwords from Chinese.

IPA	Gaeml	IPA	Gaeml	IPA	Gaeml	IPA	Gaeml	IPA	Gaeml
/p/	b	/t/	d	/tɕ/	j	/k/	g	/tʃ/	zh
/pʰ/	p	/tʰ/	t	/tɕʰ/	q	/kʰ/	k	/tʃʰ/	ch
/m/	m	/n/	n	/nʲ/	ny	/ŋ/	ng	/ʃ/	sh
/w/	w	/l/	l	/lʲ/	ly	/h/	h	/ɻ/	r
/pʲ/	bi	/s/	s	/ɕ/	x	/kʷ/	gu	/f/	f
/pʲʰ/	pi			/j/	y	/kʷʰ/	ku	/ts/	z
/mʲ/	mi					/ŋʷ/	ngu	/tsʰ/	c
/wʲ/	wi								

The Ngo Van Lyong orthography for Southern Kam has 28 syllable-initial consonants.

IPA	Gảm	IPA	Gảm	IPA	Gảm	IPA	Gảm	IPA	Gảm	IPA	Gảm	IPA	Gảm
/p/	b	/t/	d	/k/	g	/h/	h	/j/	y	/s/	s	/ts/	z
/pʰ/	p	/tʰ/	t	/kʰ/	k	/f/	f	/w/	w	/ɕ/	x	/tsʰ/	c
/tɕ/	j	/ŋ/	ng	/ʎ/	ly	/ɲ/	ny	/l/	l	/n/	n	/m/	m
/tɕʰ/	q	/ŋʰ/	ngh	/ʎʰ/	lhy	/ɲʰ/	nhy	/lʰ/	lh	/nʰ/	nh	/mʰ/	mh

=== Finals ===
The Chinese orthography for Kam has 64 syllable finals; 14 of them occur only in Chinese loans and are not listed in the table below.

IPA	Gaeml	IPA	Gaeml	IPA	Gaeml	IPA	Gaeml	IPA	Gaeml	IPA	Gaeml	IPA	Gaeml
a	a			ə	e	e	ee	i	i	o	o	u	u/uu
aɪ	ai			əɪ	ei					oɪ	oi	uɪ	ui
aʊ	ao					eʊ	eeu	iʊ	iu	oʊ	ou		
am	am	ɐm	aem	əm	em	em	eem	im	im	om	om	um	um
an	an	ɐn	aen	ən	en	en	een	in	in	on	on	un	un
aŋ	ang	ɐŋ	aeng	əŋ	eng	eŋ	eeng	iŋ	ing	oŋ	ong	uŋ	ung
ap	ab	ɐp	ab	əp	eb	ep	eb	ip	ib	op	ob	up	ub
at	ad	ɐt	ad	ət	ed	et	ed	it	id	ot	od		
ak	ag	ɐk	ag	ək	eg	ek	eg	ik	ig	ok	og	uk	ug

The phonetic value of the vowel in the finals spelled -ab, -ad and -ag, is [ɐ] in syllables that have the tones -l, -p and -c (see table below); in syllables with tones -s, -t and -x, it is [a]. The phonetic value of the vowel in the finals spelled -eb, -ed and -eg, is [ə] in syllables that have the tones -l, -p and -c; in syllables with tones -s, -t and -x, it is [e].

The Ngo Van Lyong orthography for Southern Kam has 116 syllable finals.

IPA	Gảm	IPA	Gảm	IPA	Gảm	IPA	Gảm	IPA	Gảm	IPA	Gảm
a	a	ɔ	o	e	e	u	u	i	i		
ɐ	ă	o	ô	ə	ơ	ɿ	ư	y	ü		
ai	ai	oi	oi	ɐi	ei	əi	ơi	ui	ui		
au	au	ɐu	ou	ɛu	eu	əu	ơu	iu	iu		
ʲa	ia	ʲo	io	ʲe	ie	ʷa	ua	ʷo	uo	ʷe	ue
ʲai	iai	ʲoi	ioi	ʲɐi	iei	ʲəi	iơi	ʲui	iui	ʲau	iau
ʲɐu	iou	ʲeu	ieu	ʲəu	iơu	ʷai	uai	ʷoi	uoi	ʷɐi	uei
ʷau	uau	ʷɐu	uou	ʷeu	ueu	ʷəu	uơu	ʷiu	uiu	ʷəi	uơi
an	an	am	am	aŋ	ang	ak	ak	ap	ap	at	at
ʲan	ian	ʲam	iam	ʲaŋ	iang	ʲak	iak	ʲap	iap	ʲat	iat
ʷan	uan	ʷam	uam	ʷaŋ	uang	ʷak	uak	ʷap	uap	ʷat	uat
ɐn	ăn	ɐm	ăm	ɐŋ	ăng	ɐk	ăk	ɐp	ăp	ɐt	ăt
ʲɐn	iăn	ʲɐm	iăm	ʲɐŋ	iăng	ʲɐk	iăk	ʲɐp	iăp	ʲɐt	iăt
ʷɐn	uăn	ʷɐm	uăm	ʷɐŋ	uăng	ʷɐk	uăk	ʷɐp	uăp	ʷɐt	uăt
ɔn	on	ɔm	om	ɔŋ	ong	ɔk	ok	ɔp	op	ɔt	ot
ʲɔn	ion	ʲɔm	iom	ʲɔŋ	iong	ʲɔk	iok	ʲɔp	iop	ʲɔt	iot
ʷɔn	uon	ʷɔm	uom	ʷɔŋ	uong	ʷɔk	uok	ʷɔp	uop	ʷɔt	uot
on	ôn	om	ôm	oŋ	ông	ok	ôk	op	ôp	ot	ôt
ʲon	iôn	ʲom	iôm	ʲoŋ	iông	ʲok	iôk	ʲop	iôp	ʲot	iôt
ʷon	uôn	ʷom	uôm	ʷoŋ	uông	ʷok	uôk	ʷop	uôp	ʷot	uôt
en	en	em	em	eŋ	eng	ek	ek	ep	ep	et	et
ʲen	ien	ʲem	iem	ʲeŋ	ieng	ʲek	iek	ʲep	iep	ʲet	iet
ʷen	uen	ʷem	uem	ʷeŋ	ueng	ʷek	uek	ʷep	uep	ʷet	uet
ən	ơn	əm	ơm	əŋ	ơng	ək	ơk	əp	ơp	ət	ơt
ʲən	iơn	ʲəm	iơm	ʲəŋ	iơng	ʲək	iơk	ʲəp	iơp	ʲət	iơt
ʷən	uơn	ʷəm	uơm	ʷəŋ	uơng	ʷək	uơk	ʷəp	uơp	ʷət	uơt
un	un	um	um	uŋ	ung	uk	uk	up	up	ut	ut
ʲun	iun	ʲum	ium	ʲuŋ	iung	ʲuk	iuk	ʲup	iup	ʲut	iut
in	in	im	im	iŋ	ing	ik	ik	ip	ip	it	it
ʷin	uin	ʷim	uim	ʷiŋ	uing	ʷik	uik	ʷip	uip	ʷit	uit

=== Tones ===
Kam is a tonal language. Open syllables can occur in one of nine different tones, checked syllables in six tones (so-called entering tones), so that the traditional approach counts fifteen tones. As with the Hmong alphabet, the Chinese orthography marks tones with a consonant at the end of each syllable.

tone contour:	high	high rising	low	dipping	low rising	low falling	high falling	peaking	mid
tone contour:	/˥/ (55)	/˧˥/ (35)	/˨/ (11)	/˨˦/ (24)	/˩˧/ (13)	/˧˩/ (31)	/˥˧/ (53)	/˦˥˧/ (453)	/˧/ (33)
Orthography:	-l	-p	-c	-s	-t	-x	-v	-k	-h
example (open syllable)	bal	pap	bac	bas	qat	miax	bav	pak	bah
example (open syllable)	"fish"	"grey"	"rake"	"aunt"	"light"	"knife"	"leaf"	"destroy"	"chaff"
example (checked syllable)	bedl	sedp	medc	bads	pads	bagx			
example (checked syllable)	"duck"	"seven"	"ant"	"can"?	"blood"	"white"			

The Ngô Văn Lương orthography marks tones via diacritics written above or below the vowel as with the Vietnamese alphabet and only features 6 tones.

tone contour:	high flat	low flat	high falling	low falling	high rising	low rising
tone contour:	/˧/ (33)	/˨/ (11)	/˥˩/ (51)	/˧˩/ (31)	/˧˥/ (45)	/˨˦/ (24)
Example:	ba	bá	bà	bạ	bả	bã
