= Qiannan Buyei and Miao Autonomous Prefecture =

Qiannan Prefecture 黔南州 Qianfnanf Zouy Qeenf Naif Zeb
- Autonomous Prefecture
- 黔南布依族苗族自治州 Qianfnanf Buxqyaix ziqziqzouy Qeef Naif Dol Yat Dol Hmub Zid Zid Zeb; Qiannan Buyei and Miao Autonomous Prefecture
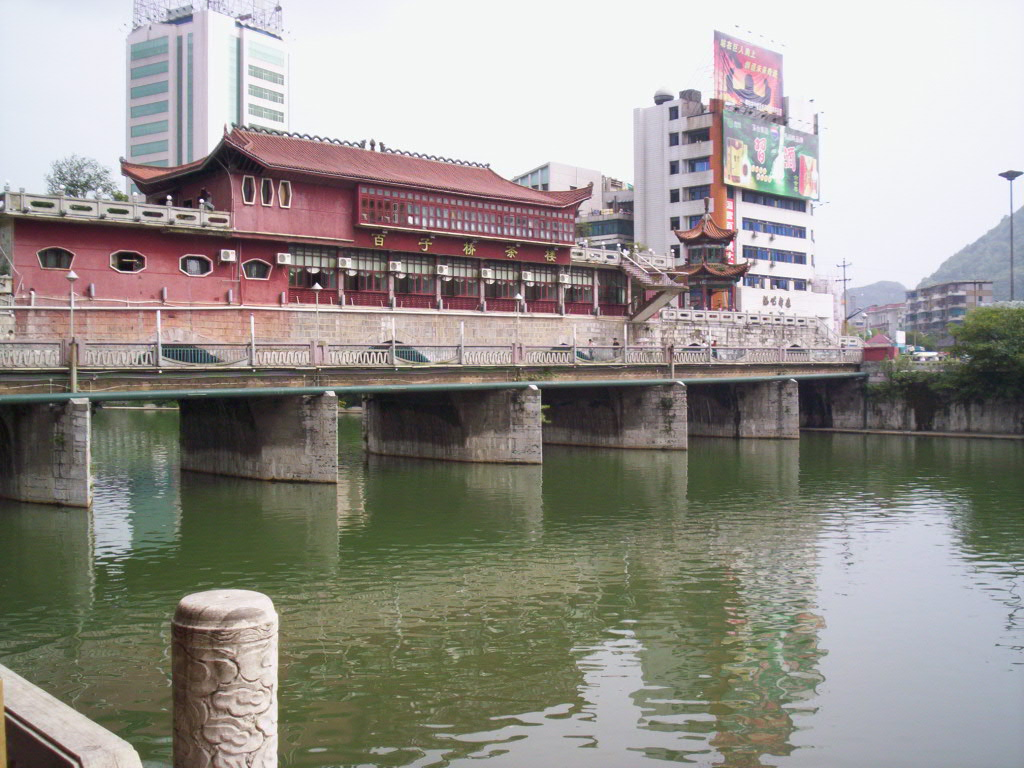

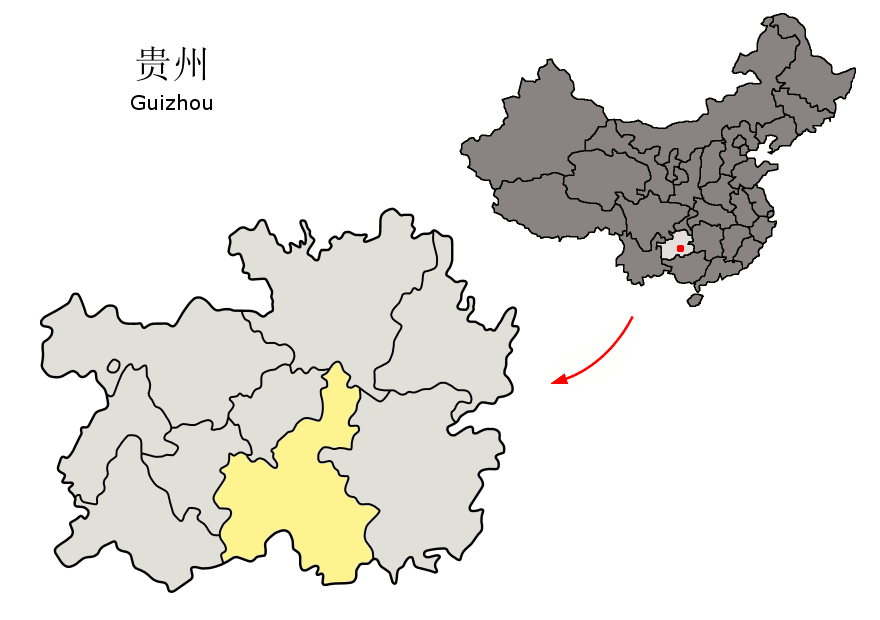
- Location of Qiannan Prefecture in Guizhou
- Coordinates (Qiannan Prefecture government): 26.25°N 107.52°E
- Country: People's Republic of China
- Province: Guizhou
- Prefecture seat: Duyun

Area
  - Total: 26,191.79 km^{2} (10,112.71 sq mi)

Population (2010)
  - Total: 3,232,714
  - Density: 123.4247/km^{2} (319.6685/sq mi)

GDP
  - Total: CN¥ 159.5 billion US$ 23.1 billion
  - Per capita: CN¥ 45,654; US$ 6,619
- Time zone: UTC+8 (China Standard)
- Postal code: 558000
- Area code: 0854
- ISO 3166 code: CN-GZ-27

Qiannan Buyei and Miao Autonomous Prefecture (Chinese: 黔南布依族苗族自治州; pinyin: Qiánnán Bùyīzú Miáozú Zìzhìzhōu; Buyei: Qianfnanf Buxqyaix Buxyeeuz ziqziqzouy; Hmu: Qeef Naif Dol Yat Dol Hmub Zid Zid Zeb) is an autonomous prefecture of Guizhou province, People's Republic of China, bordering Guangxi to the south. The prefecture's seat is Duyun, while its area is 26,192 km^{2} (10,113 sq mi). The name "黔南" derives from the prefecture's south-central location in the province; "黔" is the official abbreviation for Guizhou, while "南" means "south".

== Geography ==
Qiannan Buyei and Miao Autonomous Prefecture is located in southern Guizhou and situated between 106°12’–108°18’ E longitude and 25°04’–27°29’ N. The southernmost point of the prefecture, in Libo County, is the closest point in Guizhou to the coast, approximately 390 km from Fangchenggang (Guangxi). Qiannan borders Qiandongnan Miao and Dong Autonomous Prefecture (Guizhou) to the east, Hechi (Guangxi) to the south, Anshun and Qianxinan Buyei and Miao Autonomous Prefecture (Guizhou) to the west, and Zunyi and Guiyang (Guizhou) to the north and northwest. The total area of the prefecture is 26,192 km^{2} (10,113 sq mi).

== Political structure ==
Title	CCP Committee Secretary	People's Congress Chairman	Governor	Qiannan CPPCC Chairman
Name	Hong Hupeng	Ran Bo	Long Qiang	Vacant
Ethnicity	Han	Miao	Miao	
Born	September 1977 (age 48–49)	October 1966 (age 59)	October 1975 (age 50)	
Assumed office	October 2024	February 2022	March 2026	

== Demographics ==
According to the 2000 Census, Qiannan Prefecture had 3,569,847 inhabitants with a population density of 136.22 inhabitants/km^{2}; at the 2010 Census, it had 3,232,714 inhabitants.

== Ethnic groups in Qiannan, 2000 census ==
Nationality	Population	Percentage
Han	1,548,120	43.37%
Buyei	1,158,710	32.46%
Miao	477,347	13.37%
Shui	286,862	8.04%
Maonan	30,958	0.87%
Zhuang	13,226	0.37%
Dong	11,337	0.32%
Yao	11,149	0.31%
She	7,130	0.2%
Yi	6,927	0.19%
Tujia	4,753	0.13%
Gelao	3,001	0.08%
Mulao	2,223	0.06%
Hui	2,116	0.06%
Others	5,988	0.17%

== Subdivisions ==
The prefecture is subdivided into 12 county-level divisions: 2 county-level cities, 9 counties, and 1 autonomous county.

- County-level cities:
  - Duyun City (都匀市)
  - Fuquan City (福泉市)
- Counties:
  - Guiding County (贵定县)
  - Huishui County (惠水县)
  - Luodian County (罗甸县)
  - Weng'an County (瓮安县)
  - Libo County (荔波县)
  - Longli County (龙里县)
  - Pingtang County (平塘县)
  - Changshun County (长顺县)
  - Dushan County (独山县)
- Autonomous county:
  - Sandu Shui Autonomous County (三都水族自治县)

Map
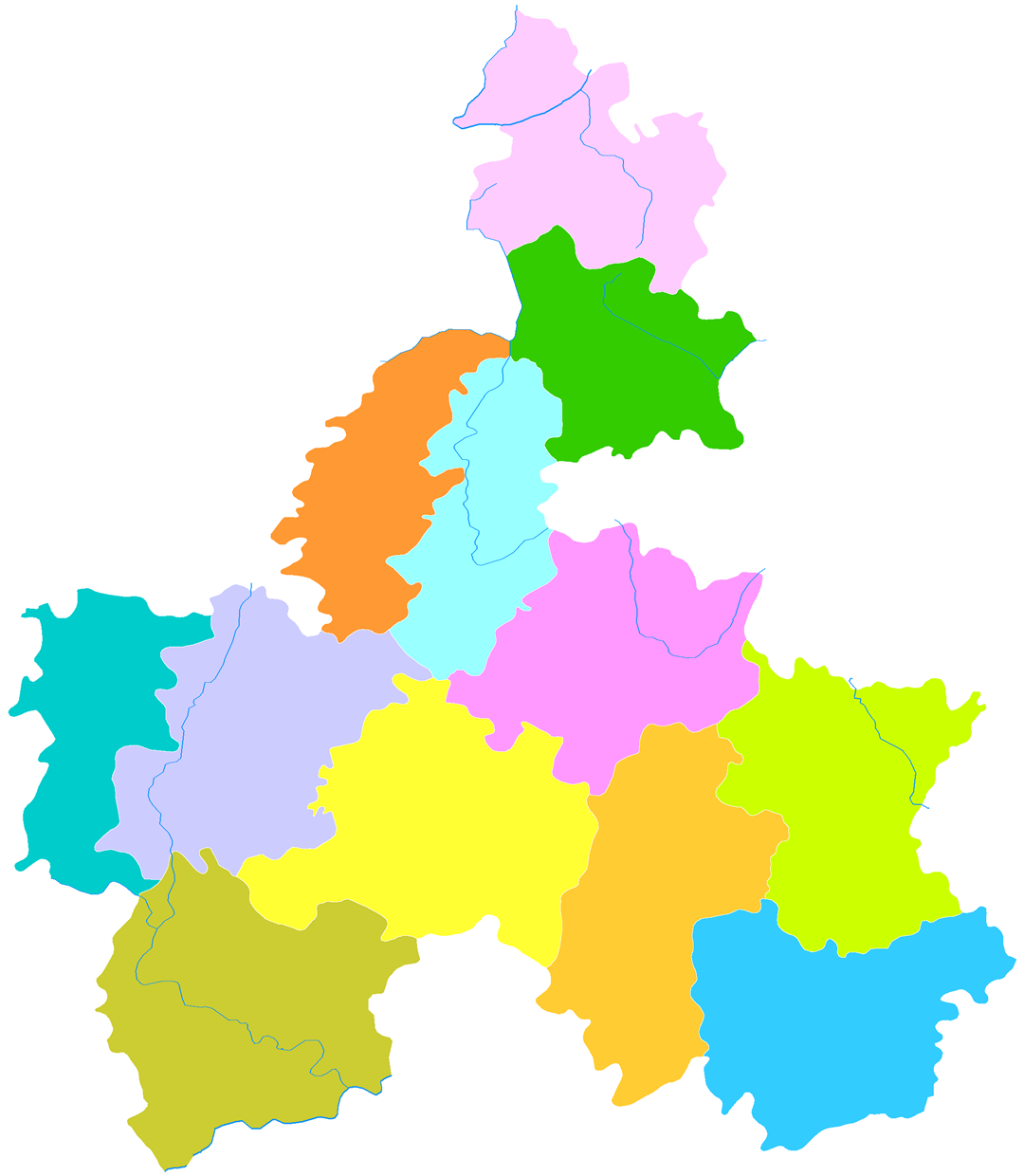
