= Duyun =

Duyun 都匀市 Tuyun
- County-level city
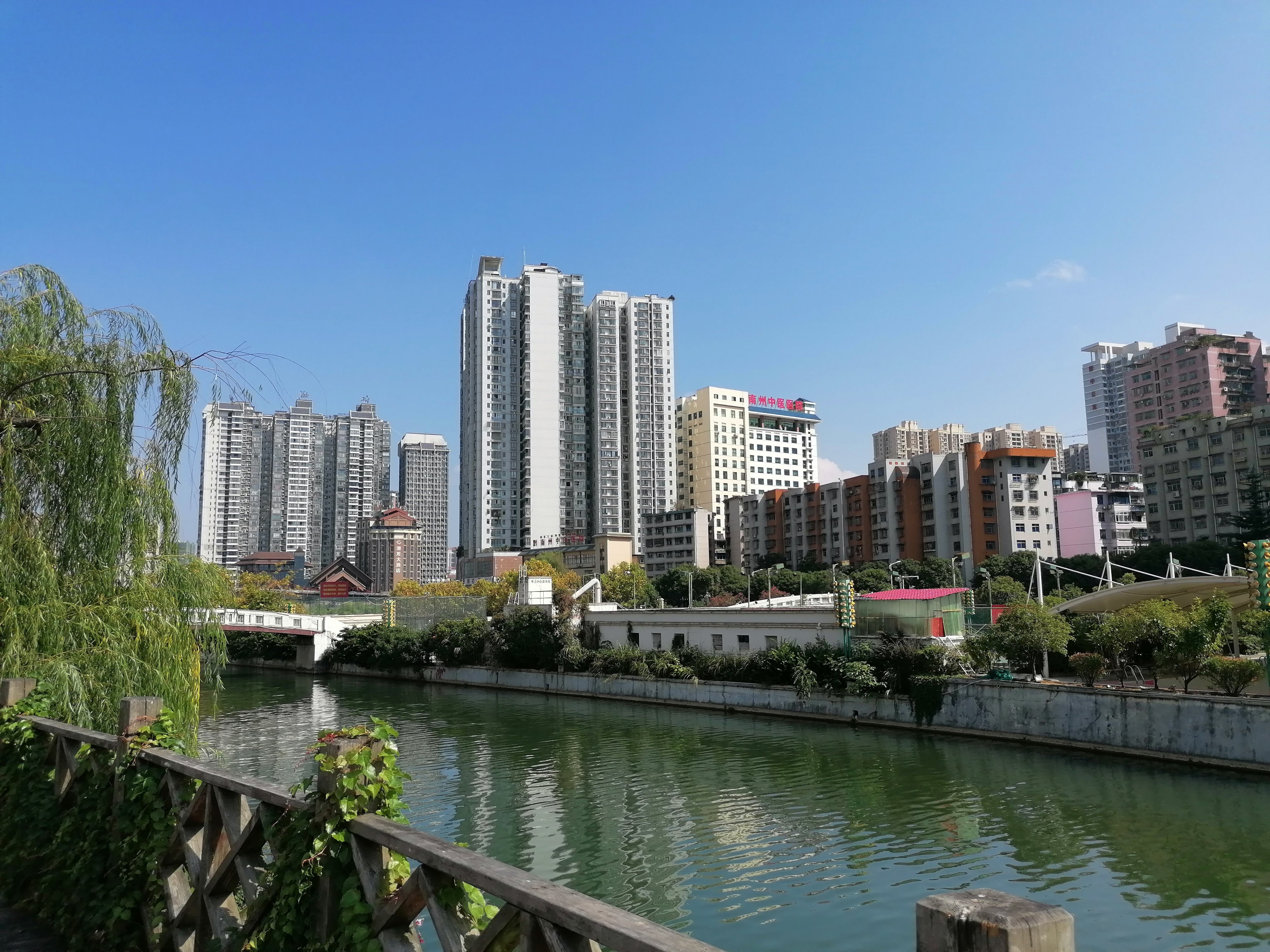

- Location within Guizhou Location within Southwest China
- Coordinates (Duyun municipal government): 26°15′34″N 107°31′07″E
- Country: China
- Province: Guizhou
- Autonomous prefecture: Qiannan
- Township-level divisions: 5 subdistricts; 4 towns; 1 Ethnic township
- Municipal seat: Guanghui

Area
  - Total: 2,274 km^{2} (878 sq mi)

Population (2020 census)
  - Total: 529,688
  - Density: 232.9/km^{2} (603.3/sq mi)
- Time zone: UTC+8 (China Standard)
- Postal code: 558000
- Area code: 0854
- Website: www.duyun.gov.cn

Duyun (simplified Chinese: 都匀; traditional Chinese: 都勻; pinyin: Dūyún) is the capital city of Qiannan Buyei and Miao Autonomous Prefecture in Guizhou province, China.

The area surrounding the city was affected by the Miao rebellion of 1735–36. The city participated in the uprising from the early stages until it was forcefully repressed the following year.

== History ==
Prior to 1949, Duyun was small, but due to economic development in the surrounding area, it became an economic center. It has expanded along the Jian River, becoming several times its previous size.

== Administrative divisions ==
Duyun City is divided into 5 subdistricts and 4 towns and 1 ethnic township:

- Guanghui Subdistrict (广惠街道)
- Wenfeng Subdistrict (文峰街道)
- Xiaoweizhai Subdistrict (小围寨街道)
- Shabaobao Subdistrict (沙包堡街道)
- Lüyinhu Subdistrict (绿茵湖街道)
- Mochong Town (墨冲镇)
- Pinglang Town (平浪镇)
- Maojian Town (毛尖镇)
- Yundong Town (匀东镇)
- Guilan Shui Ethnic Township (归兰水族乡)

== Climate ==
Climate data for Duyun, elevation 969 m (3,179 ft), (1991–2020 normals, extremes 1981–2010)
| Month | Jan | Feb | Mar | Apr | May | Jun | Jul | Aug | Sep | Oct | Nov | Dec | Year |
|---|---|---|---|---|---|---|---|---|---|---|---|---|---|
| Record high °C (°F) | 23.7 (74.7) | 29.1 (84.4) | 33.5 (92.3) | 34.5 (94.1) | 33.8 (92.8) | 34.8 (94.6) | 36.1 (97.0) | 35.9 (96.6) | 35.6 (96.1) | 32.5 (90.5) | 29.2 (84.6) | 26.1 (79.0) | 36.1 (97.0) |
| Mean daily maximum °C (°F) | 7.6 (45.7) | 11.6 (52.9) | 16.2 (61.2) | 21.0 (69.8) | 24.5 (76.1) | 26.3 (79.3) | 28.6 (83.5) | 29.2 (84.6) | 25.6 (78.1) | 20.6 (69.1) | 16.1 (61.0) | 10.0 (50.0) | 19.8 (67.6) |
| Daily mean °C (°F) | 4.3 (39.7) | 7.4 (45.3) | 11.4 (52.5) | 15.9 (60.6) | 19.7 (67.5) | 22.1 (71.8) | 23.9 (75.0) | 23.7 (74.7) | 20.7 (69.3) | 16.2 (61.2) | 11.7 (53.1) | 6.2 (43.2) | 15.3 (59.5) |
| Mean daily minimum °C (°F) | 2.2 (36.0) | 4.7 (40.5) | 8.5 (47.3) | 12.7 (54.9) | 16.5 (61.7) | 19.5 (67.1) | 21.1 (70.0) | 20.4 (68.7) | 17.8 (64.0) | 13.5 (56.3) | 8.9 (48.0) | 3.8 (38.8) | 12.5 (54.4) |
| Record low °C (°F) | −3.5 (25.7) | −4.0 (24.8) | −2.2 (28.0) | 3.4 (38.1) | 6.1 (43.0) | 13.5 (56.3) | 13.3 (55.9) | 16.0 (60.8) | 10.6 (51.1) | 4.8 (40.6) | −1.6 (29.1) | −4.5 (23.9) | −4.5 (23.9) |
| Average precipitation mm (inches) | 42.5 (1.67) | 31.8 (1.25) | 79.8 (3.14) | 120.6 (4.75) | 227.6 (8.96) | 314.8 (12.39) | 210.4 (8.28) | 132.3 (5.21) | 153.2 (6.03) | 97.1 (3.82) | 66.5 (2.62) | 33.8 (1.33) | 1,510.4 (59.45) |
| Average precipitation days (≥ 0.1 mm) | 16.4 | 13.5 | 19.1 | 18.7 | 18.8 | 19.1 | 15.5 | 13.8 | 13.3 | 14.6 | 13.9 | 12.4 | 189.1 |
| Average snowy days | 3.2 | 1.5 | 0.3 | 0 | 0 | 0 | 0 | 0 | 0 | 0 | 0.1 | 1.4 | 6.5 |
| Average relative humidity (%) | 84 | 81 | 83 | 81 | 82 | 86 | 83 | 81 | 83 | 84 | 82 | 80 | 83 |
| Mean monthly sunshine hours | 29.0 | 48.1 | 64.2 | 78.5 | 89.9 | 64.1 | 125.6 | 153.3 | 98.2 | 74.2 | 72.6 | 51.0 | 948.7 |
| Percentage possible sunshine | 9 | 15 | 17 | 20 | 22 | 16 | 30 | 38 | 27 | 21 | 23 | 16 | 21 |
Source: China Meteorological Administration

== Education ==
=== Colleges ===
- Qiannan Normal College For Nationalities (黔南民族师范学院)
- Qiannan Medical College For Nationalities (黔南民族医学高等专科学校)
- Qiannan Nationality Professional Technology College (黔南民族职业技术学院)

=== Technical school ===
- Duyun vocational technical school

=== Senior school ===
- Duyun No.1 Middle School
- Duyun No.2 Middle School
- Duyun No.5 Middle School
- Duyun No.8 Middle School

=== Middle school ===
- Duyun No.3 Middle School
- Duyun No.4 Middle School
- Duyun No.6 Middle School
- Duyun No.7 Middle School
- Duyun No.8 Middle School
- Duyun No.9 Middle School
- Duyun No.10 Middle School
- Duyun No.11 Middle School

=== Primary school ===
- Duyun No.1 Primary School
- Duyun No.2 Primary School
- Duyun No.3 Primary School
- Duyun No.4 Primary School
- Duyun No.5 Primary School
- Duyun No.6 Primary School
- Duyun No.7 Primary School
- Duyun No.8 Primary School

== Transportation ==
=== Road ===
- China National Highway 210
- China National Highway 321

=== Expressway ===
- G76 Xiamen–Chengdu Expressway
- Guiyang–Xintianzhai Expressway

=== Railway ===
- Guiyang–Guangzhou High-Speed Railway, Guiyang–Nanning High-Speed Railway-Duyun East Railway Station
- Guizhou-Guangxi Railway-Duyun Railway Station

=== Airport ===
The closest airport to Duyun is the Libo Airport located at Libo County. However, most people still use the large and busy airport in the capital city of Guiyang which is around two hours away. Libo Airport has only a few flights per week and limited destinations while the Guiyang Airport has direct connections to most cities of China.

== Relative location ==
Duyun is about 100 km southeast from Guiyang.
