= Tongdao Pinghua =

Variety of Guibei Pinghua

- Native to: China
- Region: Hunan
- Native speakers: 25,000 (2015)
- Language family: Sino-Tibetan: Sinitic; Chinese; Pinghua; Northern Pinghua; Tongdao Pinghua

Language codes
- ISO 639-3: None (mis)
- ISO 639-6: (none)
- Glottolog: None

The Tongdao Pinghua is a variety of Guibei Pinghua (桂北平话) influenced by Kam (Dong). It is spoken by about 25,000 people in Tongdao Dong Autonomous County, Hunan, China (Shi 2015:137).

Although Tongdao Pinghua speakers are classified by the Chinese government as ethnic Han, the speakers consider themselves to be a distinct ethnic group, and neither Han nor Kam.

== Names ==
Tongdao Pinghua speakers call their own language Bendihua 本地话 (the name Bendihua (Chinese: 本地话) literally means 'native language'), although some speakers also refer to it as Jiangping 讲平. The Kam people refer to it as li31 ka31 ti41, and the Yao (Pa Hng speakers) refer to it as Luoyanhua (洛岩话; "Luoyan language").

Tongdao Pinghua speakers call themselves the wən22 ɲən22 people (我们人) (Shi 2015:137). The Dong call them ka31 pən33 ti33 (Chinese: 本地客) or ka31 ti33 (Chinese: 地客), while the language is called li31 ka31 ti42 (Chinese: 本地话). The Dong refer to Han Chinese of Jingzhou County, Hunan as ka31 (Chinese: 客), and their language as li31 ka31 (Chinese: 客话). The Yao refer to the Bendi language as lo33 ŋai33.

== Locations ==
Within Tongdao Dong Autonomous County, Hunan Province, Tongdao Pinghua is primarily spoken in Xiaxiang 下乡, Linkou 临口, and Jingwuzhou 菁芜州 townships. Tongdao Pinghua is also spoken to a lesser extent in the townships of Mujiao 木脚, Xikou 溪口, and Malong 马龙, as well as Chengbu County, Hunan and Longsheng County, Guangxi.

== Dialects ==
Peng (2010:1) divides Tongdao Pinghua into 4 main dialects.

- Xiaxiang 下乡话: spoken in the townships of Xiaxiang 下乡 (entire township), Linkou 临口 (in the villages of Guantuan 官团, Shanxi 山溪, and Shibi 石壁), and Mujiao 木脚 (in Xishang Village 溪上 and Gengtou Village 更头)
- Jingwu 菁芜话: spoken in some villages in Jingwuzhou Township 菁芜洲镇. Shi (2015) documents the variety of Luantang 銮塘 in Jingwuzhou Township 菁芜洲镇.
- Xingwu 杏五话: spoken by just under 3,000 people in Linkou Township 临口乡 (in Xinhua 杏花 and Wuyi 五一 villages, as well as other neighboring villages)
- Taizhong 太中话: spoken in the townships of Taipingyan 太平岩, Zhongtuan 中团, and Mujiao 木脚 (in Mujiao Village 木脚村)

Shi (2015) recognizes the 4 Tongdao Pinghua dialects of:

- Luantang 銮塘
- Linkou 临口
- Taipingyan 太平岩
- Dengkou 邓口
