= Nuoxi language =

Kam-Sui language spoken in Hunan, China

Nuoxi Yao
- Native to: China
- Region: Hunan
- Native speakers: 2,500 (2015)
- Language family: Kra–Dai: Kam–Sui; Kam; Nuoxi Yao

Language codes
- ISO 639-3: None (mis)
- Glottolog: naxi1247

Nuoxi Yao (Chinese: 𦰡溪瑶话), or Nuoxihua 𦰡溪话, is a Kam–Sui language of Nuoxi Township, Dongkou County, Hunan Province, China. Even though they are classified as ethnic Yao people by the Chinese government, the Nuoxi Yao speak a Kam–Sui language closely related to Dong. Shi (2015:132) considers Nuoxi Yao to have split off from Dong about 600 years.

== Names ==
The Nuoxi Yao call themselves the ɲiu1 (Shi 2015:107) or mu2 ɲiu1 (Shi 2015:125), and refer to their own language as kin1 (Shi 2015:107). The town of Nuoxi (the first syllable is pronounced nuó in Mandarin (Shi 2015:107)) is pronounced in the local Hunanese dialect as lo2 ȶʰi1.

== Demographics ==
Shi (2015:107) estimates a total of 2,500 speakers and 5,000 ethnic Yao in Nuoxi Township. According to the Shaoyang Prefecture Gazetteer (1997), language varieties closely related to Southern Kam are spoken in Nuoxi, Dongkou County (which had 4,280 ethnic Yao in 1982 (Chen 2013:39)) and Lianmin, Suining County.

The Suining County Gazetteer [绥宁县志] (1997) documents the variety of Lianmin Yao as spoken in Xiaohuang, Tianluoxuan Village, Lianmin Ethnic Miao and Yao Township, Suining County, Hunan Province, China. It is closely related to Nuoxi Yao.

== History ==
Chen Qiguang (2013:39) reports that the ancestors of Nuoxihua speakers had migrated to their current location from Tianzhu, Liping, and Yuping counties of southeastern Guizhou during the early 15th century. According to Shi Lin (2015:126), the Nuoxi Yao had migrated from Gaoyi Township, Huitong County, Hunan Province in 1403.

== See also ==
- Hunan Kam-Sui languages comparative vocabulary list (contains lexical data of Nuoxi Yao and Lianmin Yao)
