= Mulao people =

仫佬族 Mulam

Total population
- 277,233 (2020)

Regions with significant populations
- Guangxi, China

Languages
- Mulam

Religion
- Mostly Buddhist, Taoist with strong Animist influence

Related ethnic groups
- Dong, Zhuang

The Mulao people (Chinese: 仫佬族; pinyin: Mùlǎo zú; own name: Mulam) are an ethnic group. They form one of the 56 ethnic groups officially recognized by the People's Republic of China. In their name, Mulam, mu^{6} is a classifier for human beings and lam^{1} (in some dialects it is kyam^{1}) is another form of the name used by the Dong (Kam), to whom the Mulao people are ethnically related. A large portion of the Mulao in Guangxi live in Luocheng Mulao Autonomous County of Hechi, Guangxi, China. As of the 2020 Chinese Census, there are 277,233 Mulao people in China, comprising about 0.019% of China's total population.

== History ==
It is believed that the Mulao are the descendants of the ancient Ling and Liao tribes that inhabited the region during the time of the Jin Dynasty. During the Yuan dynasty, the Mulao lived in a feudal society and they paid a series of tributes twice a year to the emperor.

During the Qing Dynasty, their territories suffered an administrative division; their lands were divided into dongs, which were composed of units for 10 dwellings. Each dong had its own local leader, responsible for maintaining the order and of collecting the taxes. Each dong was generally formed by families that shared the same surname.

Qiongying Deng and Chuan-Chao Wang et al. have reported that most of the patrilineal and matrilineal gene pools of Mulao are characteristic lineages of Southern China. Some ancient Southeast Asian lineages (Y chromosome haplogroups C and D, mtDNA haplogroups M*, M33, M74 and R*) were also identified in Mulao. Mulao shows patterns of the Y chromosome and mtDNA diversities similar to other southern populations, especially Kam-Sui populations, which was actually in accordance with linguistic classification. However, the origin of Mulao seems to be much more complex. Recent gene flow from Sino-Tibetan populations is detected in the patrilineal side of Mulao, such as Y chromosome haplogroups O3a1c-002611, O3a2c1*-M134 and O3a2c1a-M117, probably through the expansion and dispersal of Han Chinese. From the matrilineal aspect, most mtDNA haplogroups of Mulao also clustered together with Hmong-Mien. Taken together, the origin of Mulao are mainly results of an admixture between surrounding populations with the indigenous Kam-Sui populations.

The Mulao population of China has been increasing in the 21st century, growing from 207,352 in 2000 to 216,257 in 2010.

== Demographics ==
According to the 2010 Chinese Census, of the 216,257 Mulao people living in China, 17,640 (8.16%) are 4 years old or younger, 13,879 (6.42%) are 5 to 9 years old, 13,842 (6.40%) are 10 to 14 years old, 15,653 (7.24%) are 15 to 19 years old, 22,221 (10.28%) are 20 to 24 years old, 21,190 (9.80%) are 25 to 29 years old, 17,868 (8.26%) are 30 to 35 years old, 18,320 (8.47%) are 35 to 39 years old, 17,989 (8.32%) are 40 to 44 years old, 14,747 (6.82%) are 45 to 49 years old, 9,496 (4.39%) are 50 to 54 years old, 10,053 (4.65%) are 55 to 59 years old, 6,950 (3.21%) are 60 to 64 years old, 5,489 (2.54%) are 65 to 69 years old, 4,694 (2.17%) are 70 to 74 years old, 3,341 (1.54%) are 75 to 79 years old, 1,845 (0.85%) are 80 to 84 years old, 716 (0.33%) are 85 to 89 years old, 230 (0.11%) are 90 to 94 years old, 82 (0.04%) are 95 to 99 years old, and 12 (0.01%) are 100 years old or older.

=== Distribution ===
According to the 2010 Chinese Census, there are 216,257 Mulao people living within China, a majority of which live in Guangxi. Per the census, there are 110,516 Mulao males and 105,741 females. The Mulao people remain fairly rural, with 95,703 Chinese Mulao living in urban areas as of 2010, and 120,554 living in rural areas.

Distribution of Mulao people in China
Provincial-level division	2010	
Provincial-level division	Population	Percent of total Mulao in China
Guangxi	172,305	79.68%
Guizhou	24,956	11.54%
Guangdong	10,961	5.07%
Zhejiang	2,792	1.29%
Hunan	906	0.42%
Other	4,337	2.01%
Total	216,257	100.00%

== Language ==
The Mulao speak the Mulam language, a Tai–Kadai language that uses Hanzi (Chinese characters) when written.

== Culture ==
Traditionally, the marriages among the Mulao were arranged by the parents and traditionally, new wives did not live together with their new husbands until the birth of their first son.

Their homes are made out of clay with brick roofs and are composed of three rooms. The animals are maintained far away from the family dwellings.

The traditional clothing of the men consists of a jacket of large buttons, wide pants and sandals. The single women arranged their hair into two tresses that become a tuft when they are married.

== Religion ==
Although religion no longer plays a significant role in their daily life, traditionally the Mulao have been mostly animists. Each month they would celebrate diverse festivals. The most important one of these was the festival Yifan, where diverse sacrifices of animals were carried out.

Another one of their festivals was the dragon boat festival that was celebrated on the fifth day of the fifth lunar month. During this celebration, the shamans carried out ceremonies to assure good crop harvests and to expel harmful insects.
