= Libo County =

Libo County 荔波县 Lipo
- County
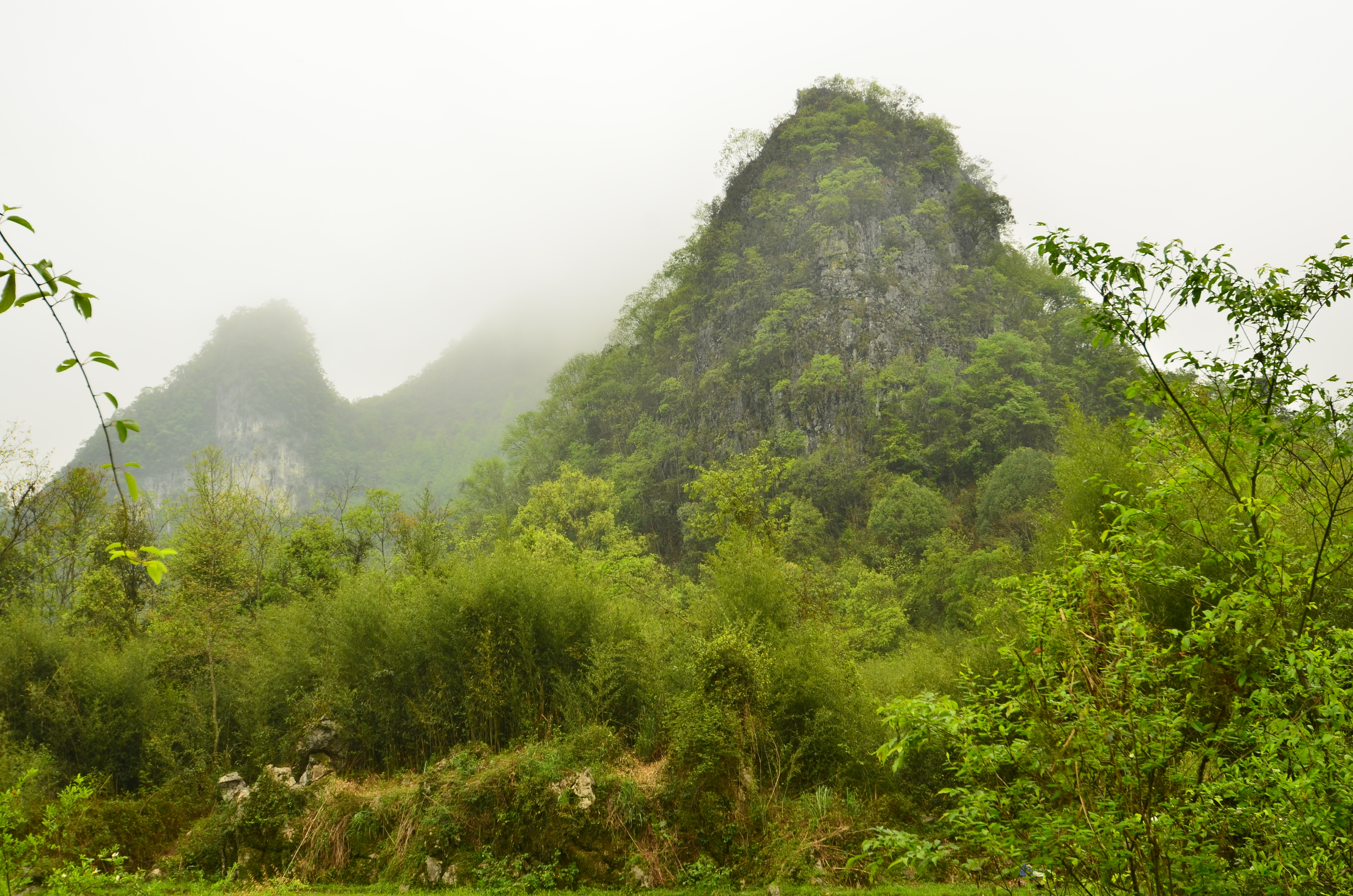

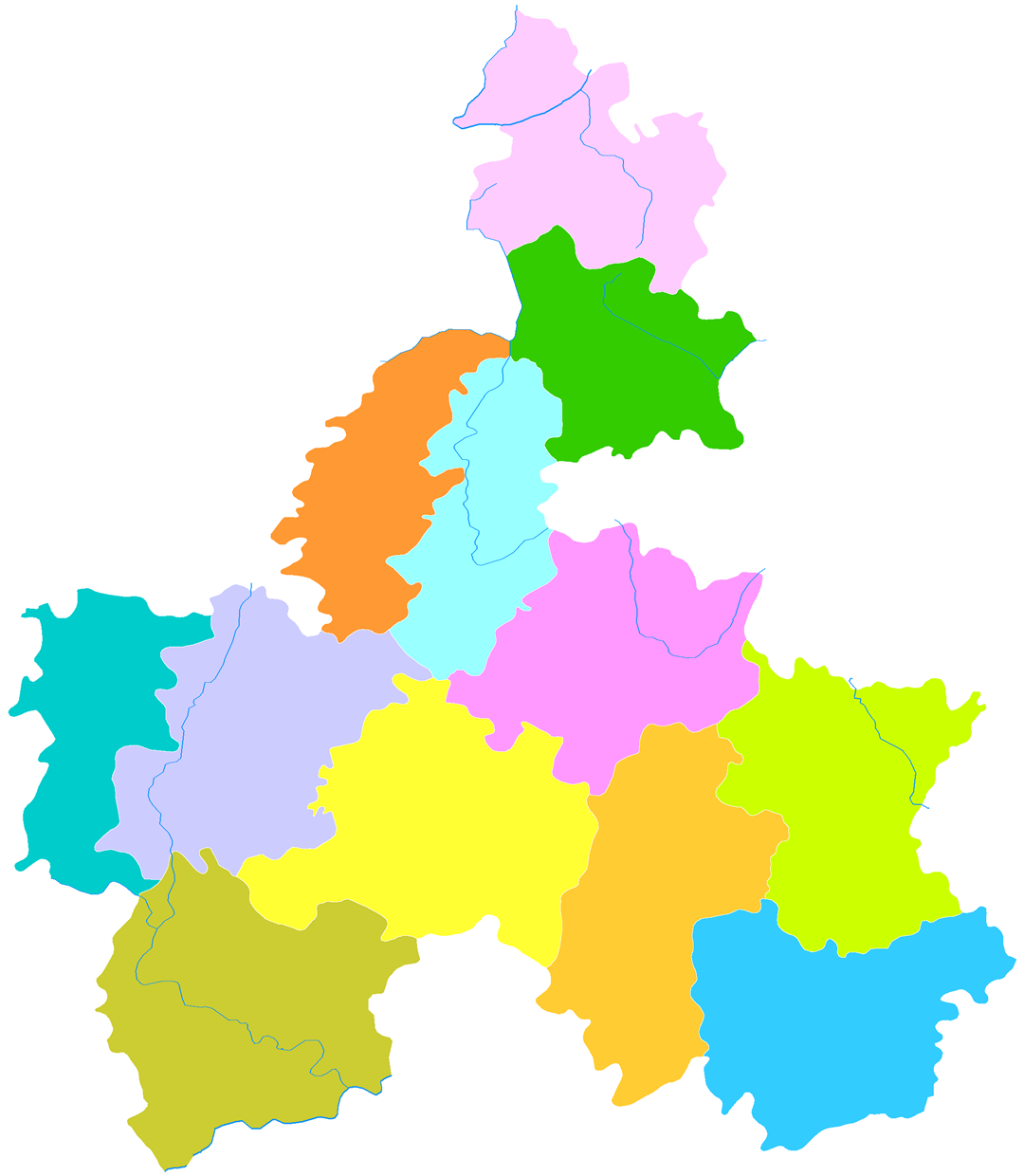
- Libo is the southeasternmost division in this map of Qiannan

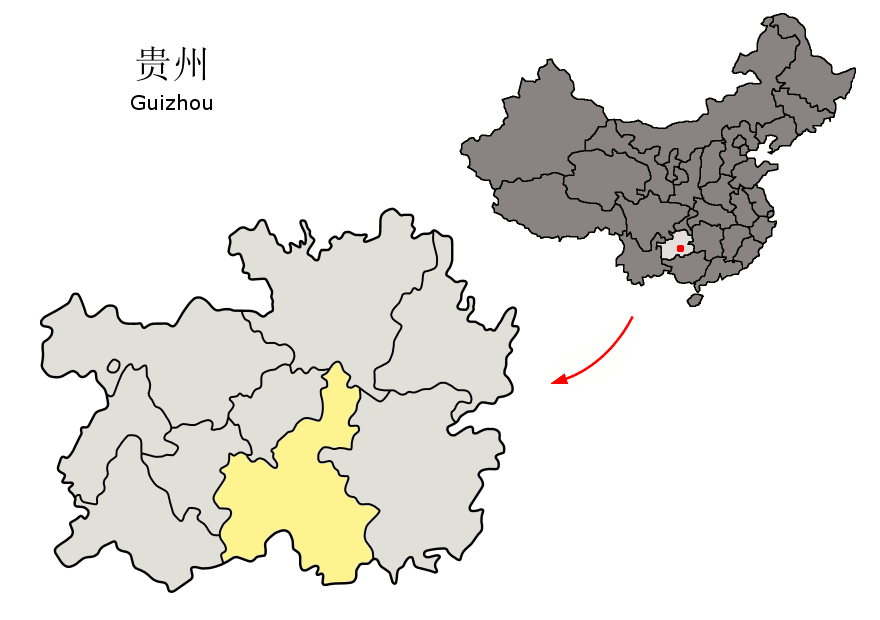
- Qiannan in Guizhou

- Location of the seat in Guizhou Libo (Southwest China)
- Coordinates (Libo County government): 25°25′26″N 107°53′56″E
- Country: China
- Province: Guizhou
- Autonomous prefecture: Qiannan
- County seat: Yuping

Area
  - Total: 2,432 km^{2} (939 sq mi)

Population (2010)
  - Total: 144,849
  - Density: 59.56/km^{2} (154.3/sq mi)
- Time zone: UTC+8 (China Standard)
- Postal code: 558400
- Area code: 0584
- Website: http://www.libo.gov.cn/

Libo County (simplified Chinese: 荔波县; traditional Chinese: 荔波縣; pinyin: Lìbō Xiàn) is a county of southern Guizhou province, China, bordering Guangxi to the south. It is under the administration of the Qiannan Buyei and Miao Autonomous Prefecture.

== Geography ==
The county is located in the remote southeastern corner of the prefecture, on the border with Guangxi. Two local sites, Xiaoqikong (小七孔) and Dongduo (洞多), notable for their spectacular karst formations, form part of the multi-site South China Karst UNESCO World Heritage Site inscribed in 2007, which is an area about 550,000 km2 in extent.

== Administrative divisions ==
Libo County is divided into 1 subdistrict, 5 towns and 2 ethnic township:

subdistrict

- Yuping Subdistrict 玉屏街道

towns

- Chaoyang Town 朝阳镇
- Maolan Town 茂兰镇
- Jialiang Town 甲良镇
- Jiarong Town 佳荣镇
- Xiaoqikong Town 小七孔镇

ethnic townships

- Yaoshan Yao Ethnic Township 瑶山瑶族乡
- Limingguan Shui Ethnic Township 黎明关水族乡

== Languages ==
Southwestern Mandarin, Mak, Ai-Cham, Bouyei, Sui, and Numao are spoken in Libo County. Sui is spoken primarily in Shuiyao Shui Ethnic Township 水尧水族乡.

== Transportation ==
The Qiannan Libo Airport, opened in late 2007, has capacity to receive planes of the Boeing 737 class, and to handle up to 220,000 passengers annually. However, the $57-million facility is rather underutilized so far. According to the Civil Aviation Administration of China (CAAC) statistics, 151 paying passengers flew into or out of the airport in 2009 - which was a 98% drop compared to the previous year (7886 passengers), and placed the airport the last in list of the nation's 166 airports by traffic volume. Currently four airlines use the airport.

== Flora ==
The karst environments in Libo County consist of the following types of forests.

- Warm coniferous forest
  - Pinus kwangtungensis forest
- Warm needle and broad-leaved mixed forest
  - Pseudotsuga sinensis, Platycarya longipes mixed forest
  - Pseudotsuga sinensis, Pinus kwangtungensis, Quercus phillyraeoides mixed forest
- Evergreen and deciduous broad-leaved mixed forest
  - Cyclobalanopsis glauca, Platycarya longipes mixed forest
  - Platycarya longipes, Phellodendron amurense mixed forest
  - Platycarya longipes, Viburnum mixed forest
  - Handeliodendron bodinieri, Acer mixed forest
  - Viburnum, Heptapleurum heptaphyllum mixed forest
  - Sterculiaceae, Cyclobalanopsis glauca mixed forest
  - Taxus cuspidata, Lindera mixed forest
  - Koelreuteria paniculata, Aceraceae mixed forest
  - Castanopsis fargesii, Elaeocarpaceae mixed forest
- Big-cluster bamboo forest
  - Dendrocalamus tsiangii forest

Common angiosperm genera include Beilschmiedia, Cryptocarya, Casearia, Diospyros, Pittosporum, Acer, Carpinus, Ulmus, Viburnum, Prunus, and Rosa. Protected wild plants in Libo County include Handeliodendron bodinieri, Mussaenda anomala, Taxus chinensis, Paphiopedilum emersonii, Paphiopedilum barbigerum and Paphiopedilum micranthum, Pinus kwangtungensis, Pseudotsuga sinensis, Pseudotsuga brevifolia, Calocedrus macrolepis, Tetrathyrium subcordatum, Trachycarpus nana, Emmenopterys henryi, Liriodendron chinense.

== Climate ==
Climate data for Libo, elevation 430 m (1,410 ft), (1991–2020 normals, extremes 1981–present)
Month	Jan	Feb	Mar	Apr	May	Jun	Jul	Aug	Sep	Oct	Nov	Dec	Year
Record high °C (°F)	26.2 (79.2)	32.3 (90.1)	34.7 (94.5)	35.8 (96.4)	36.1 (97.0)	36.5 (97.7)	37.9 (100.2)	39.2 (102.6)	37.3 (99.1)	35.6 (96.1)	31.3 (88.3)	29.2 (84.6)	39.2 (102.6)
Mean daily maximum °C (°F)	12.4 (54.3)	15.5 (59.9)	19.1 (66.4)	24.6 (76.3)	28.2 (82.8)	30.1 (86.2)	31.8 (89.2)	32.3 (90.1)	30.0 (86.0)	25.3 (77.5)	20.9 (69.6)	15.5 (59.9)	23.8 (74.9)
Daily mean °C (°F)	8.6 (47.5)	11.1 (52.0)	14.6 (58.3)	19.6 (67.3)	23.2 (73.8)	25.5 (77.9)	26.7 (80.1)	26.4 (79.5)	24.1 (75.4)	19.9 (67.8)	15.4 (59.7)	10.6 (51.1)	18.8 (65.9)
Mean daily minimum °C (°F)	6.1 (43.0)	8.2 (46.8)	11.6 (52.9)	16.1 (61.0)	19.6 (67.3)	22.5 (72.5)	23.5 (74.3)	22.8 (73.0)	20.3 (68.5)	16.5 (61.7)	11.8 (53.2)	7.4 (45.3)	15.5 (60.0)
Record low °C (°F)	−4.3 (24.3)	−1.9 (28.6)	0.0 (32.0)	3.8 (38.8)	7.9 (46.2)	12.5 (54.5)	15.7 (60.3)	17.5 (63.5)	11.8 (53.2)	5.3 (41.5)	−0.1 (31.8)	−4.0 (24.8)	−4.3 (24.3)
Average precipitation mm (inches)	27.4 (1.08)	30.0 (1.18)	53.4 (2.10)	94.2 (3.71)	167.9 (6.61)	262.0 (10.31)	218.1 (8.59)	176.2 (6.94)	94.7 (3.73)	65.9 (2.59)	38.5 (1.52)	22.0 (0.87)	1,250.3 (49.23)
Average precipitation days (≥ 0.1 mm)	10.0	9.0	13.7	14.6	16.7	18.6	18.2	15.0	10.2	9.9	8.5	7.3	151.7
Average snowy days	1.2	0.4	0	0	0	0	0	0	0	0	0	0.3	1.9
Average relative humidity (%)	74	73	76	76	78	82	82	80	77	76	75	71	77
Mean monthly sunshine hours	37.5	43.0	54.5	77.7	93.8	81.4	132.5	159.9	141.4	103.3	91.8	74.1	1,090.9
Percentage possible sunshine	11	13	15	20	22	20	32	40	39	29	28	23	24
Source: China Meteorological Administration
