= Maonan people =

Maonan 毛南 Anan
Total population
- 124,092 (2020 census)

Regions with significant populations
- China (Guangxi, Guizhou)

Languages
- Maonan

Religion
- Taoism and animism

Related ethnic groups
- Dong, Zhuang

The Maonan people (Chinese: 毛南族; pinyin: Máonán zú; Maonan: Anan, literally "local people") are one of the 56 ethnic groups officially recognized by the People's Republic of China. There are a total of 124,092 Maonan as of 2010, mostly living in northern Guangxi and southern Guizhou in southern China.

The Maonan people's autonyms are ʔai^{1} na:n^{6} (a Maonan person), kjɔŋ^{5} na:n^{6} (the Maonan people). Their language is called va^{6} na:n^{6} (Lu 2008:33).

== Society ==
More than 80% of the Maonan share the same surname: Tan (simplified Chinese: 谭; traditional Chinese: 譚). Maonan with the surname Tan believe that they are descended from the old inhabitants of the province of Hunan that migrated to Guangxi and married Maonan women. Other common surnames found in this ethnic group are: Lu (卢/盧), Liu (刘/劉), Shi (石), Qin (覃), Wei (韦/韋) and Yuan (袁).

The towns of the Maonan do not surpass more than 100 dwellings. Their towns are organized by clan. Their dwellings are very similar to those of the Zhuang; they are usually made up of two floors and constructed out of planks and clay. The upper floor is used as the living quarters while the lower one serves as a granary and stable.

Traditionally, the marriages were arranged by the parents when the future newlyweds are still children. Traditionally when a Maonan woman became a widow, the brother of her late husband took her as his wife.

During the funeral service, the children of the deceased had to "buy" water of a river to be able to wash the corpse. Before proceeding to the burial, the blood of a chicken was poured on the land to purify it and to bless the spirit of the dead person.

== Cuisine ==
Maonan cuisine includes many pickled dishes, of which the most famous ones are known as the sa:m^{1} səm^{3} ta^{5} ma:u^{6}na:n^{6} (three-sour-middle-Maonan) "The Three Maonan Sour Dishes" (Lu 2008:47). These three dishes are:

1. na:n^{4} səm^{3} - pickled meat
2. zo^{5} fa:t^{7} - fermented soup
3. ʔɔŋ^{5} ʔwu:i^{5} - (dish preserved with) lime in an urn

Rice wine is also popular among the Maonan.

== Religion ==
Traditional Maonan religion is both animistic and polytheistic, with heavy Taoist influences. Many deities and rituals are borrowed from Chinese folk religion. Important figures and deities are listed below (Lu 2008:51).

- Kitchen God - for the family's welfare
- God of Earth - for peaceful outdoor activities
- General Li Guang - A historical figure from the Western Han Dynasty who is venerated as a protector of villages.
- Shentu and Yulei - These two legendary figures protect homes from malevolent devils by feeding them to tigers. They are placed on front doors to ward off evil.
- Thunder God
- The Thunder Soldiers
- Flower God
- Guanyin
- muŋ^{2} ku:n^{1} - an evil immortal
- lu^{2} pa:n^{1} - a historical figure who was a master carpenter
- lɔk^{8} gi:u^{2} - a legendary figure who was a bridge builder
- ^{ʔ}bi:u^{2} - Emperor Yao
- sa:m^{3} ȵɔn^{2} - a religious figure
- za^{4} wa:ŋ^{2} - the God of the Earth
- ni^{4} fa:n^{1} su:i^{5} - the Goddess of Birth

Maonan household shrines are called ji:ŋ^{1} wa^{3} (Lu 2008:51). The shrine consists of a wooden plate on a wall facing the front entrance. Names of deities and family ancestors are written on the plate.

The Maonan people also perform a redemptive ritual called vɛ^{4} da:u^{4} in order to show gratitude to ni^{4} fa:n^{1} su:i^{5} (cf. Chinese: Wansui Niangniang 万岁娘娘, the birth goddess). During Maonan weddings, couples ask the birth goddess for fertility. After the couple has children, they thank the birth goddess by offering 26 animals (1 ox, 7 small pigs, and 19 chickens and ducks).
