= Bouyei people =

Asian ethnic group

Bouyei buxQyaix
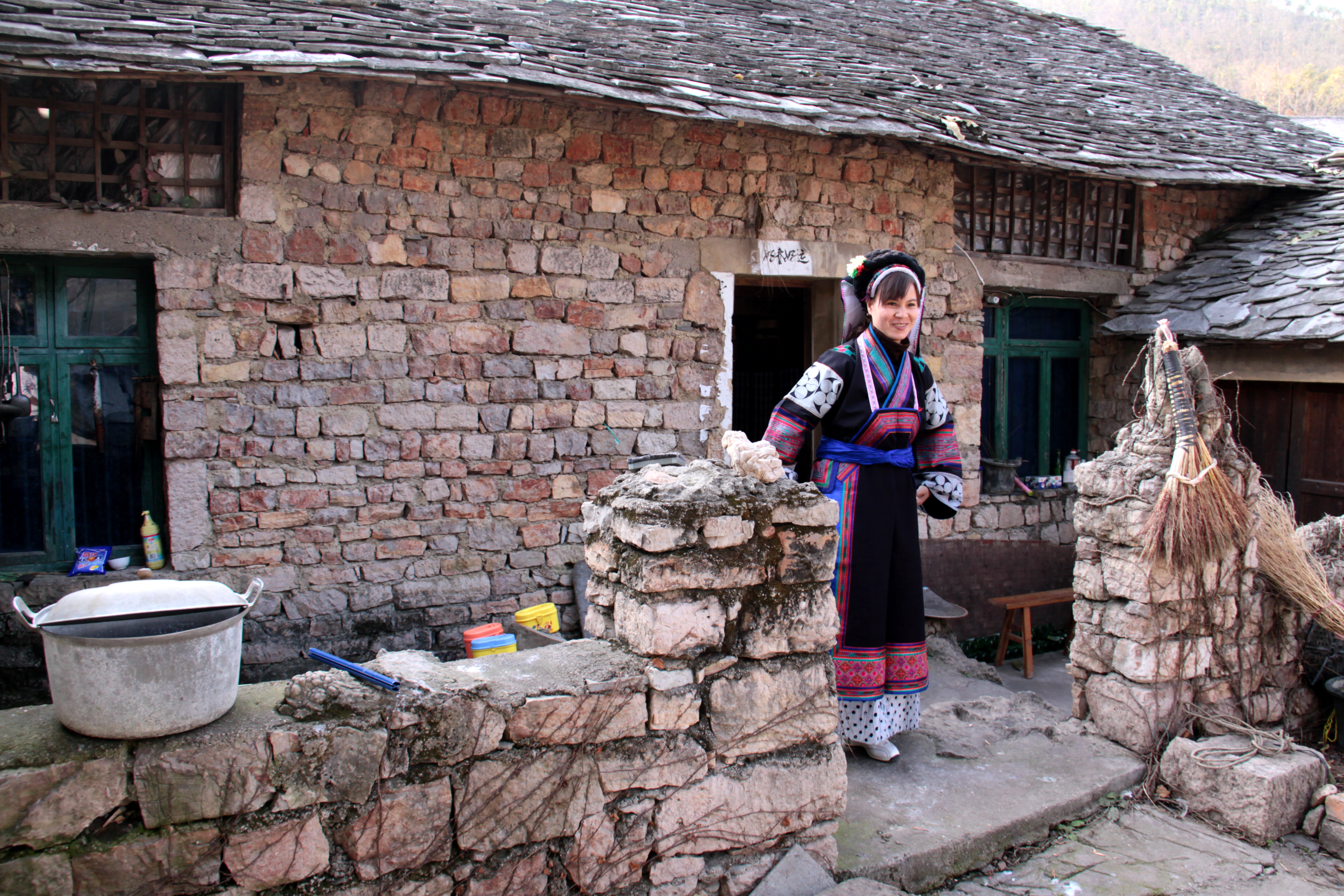
- A Bouyei woman in front of her house in China

Regions with significant populations
- China 3,576,752 (2020); Vietnam 3,232 (2019)

Languages
- Bouyei • Mandarin Chinese • Vietnamese

Religion
- Shigongism • Buddhism

Related ethnic groups
- Giáy, Zhuang

Bouyei people

Chinese name
- Simplified Chinese: 布依族
- Traditional Chinese: 布依族
Transcriptions
Standard Mandarin
- Hanyu Pinyin: Bùyīzú
- Bopomofo: ㄅㄨˋ ㄧ ㄗㄨˊ
- Gwoyeu Romatzyh: Buhitzwu
- Wade–Giles: Pu^{4}i^{1}tsu^{2}
- Yale Romanization: Buyidzu
Yue: Cantonese
- Jyutping: Bou3 ji1 zuk6

Vietnamese name
- Vietnamese alphabet: người Bố Y

Bouyei name
- Bouyei: Buxqyaix

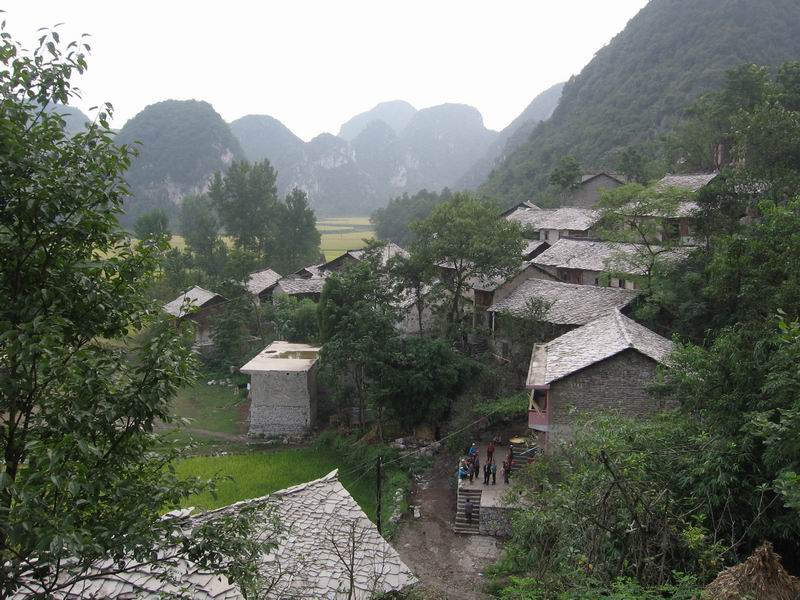
Bouyei minority Shitou village, West Guizhou

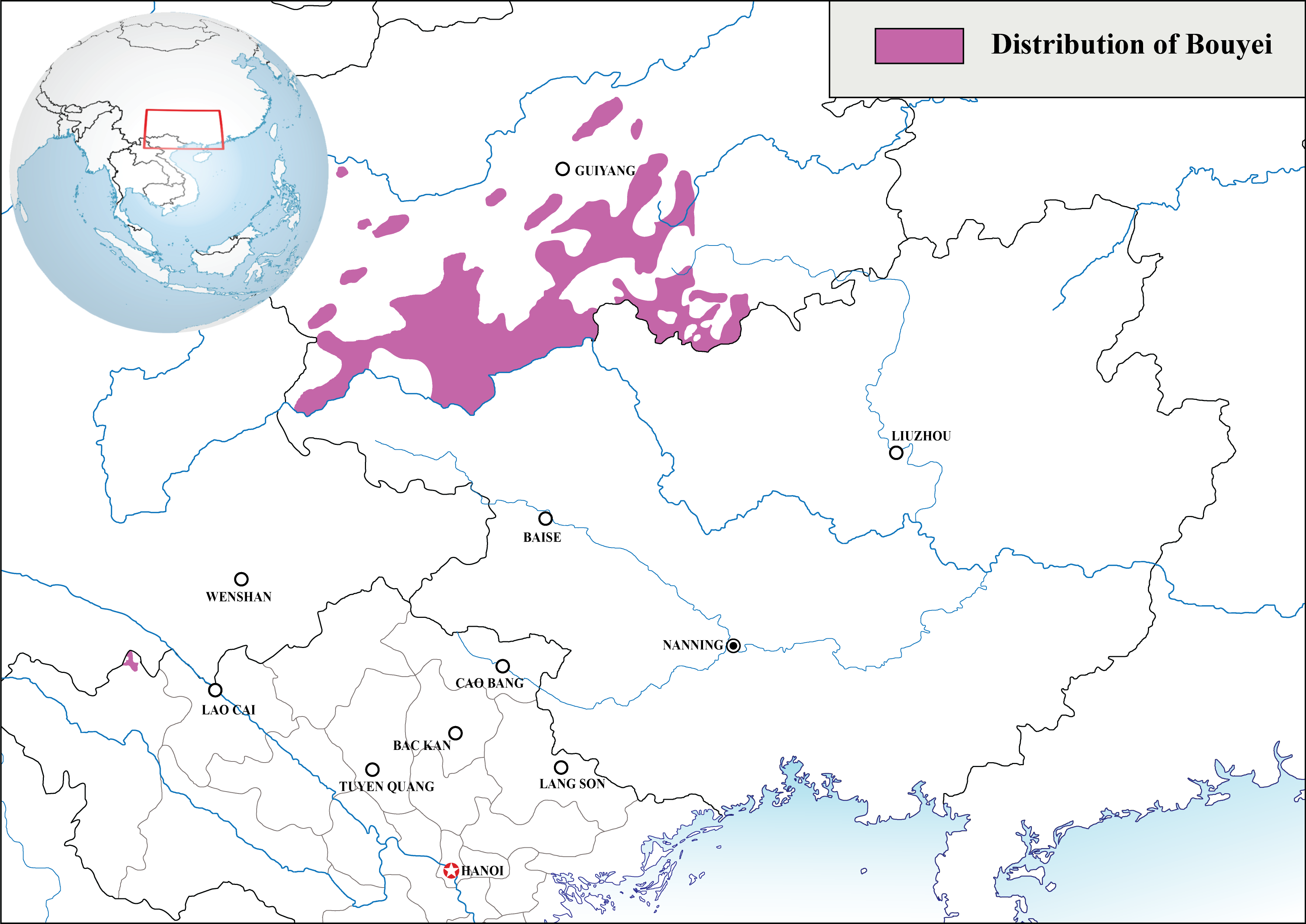
Geographic distribution of Bouyei people

The Bouyei (also spelled Puyi, Buyei and Buyi; Bouyei: Buxqyaix, [puʔjai] or "Puzhong", "Burao", "Puman"; Chinese: 布依族; pinyin: Bùyīzú; Vietnamese: người Bố Y) are a Tai-speaking ethnic group who mostly live in the province of Guizhou in Southern China. Numbering 3.5 million, they are the 10th largest of the 56 ethnic groups officially recognized by the People's Republic of China. Some 3,000 Bouyei also live in Northern Vietnam, where they are one of that nation's 54 officially recognized ethnic groups.

== Names ==
The Bouyei consist of various subgroups. Below are their autonyms written in the International Phonetic Alphabet with numerical Chao tones.

- pu˦˨ ʔjɐi˦˨, 濮越
- pu˦˨ ʔji˨, 濮夷
- pu˦˨ noŋ˧˩, 布侬
- pu˦˨ loŋ˧˩, 补笼
- pu˦˨ na˧˩, 布那
- pu˦˨ tu˦˨, 布土、布都
- pu˦˨ ʔjaŋ˧, 布央
- pu˦˨ zoŋ˧˩xa˧˥, 布笼哈

Some clans within the Bouyei groups include:

- pu˦˨ wu˦˨, 布武
- pu˦˨ wei˧˩, 布韦
- pu˦˨ lo˨˦, 布鲁

In Congjiang County, Guizhou, there is a group that refer to themselves as "Buyeyi, 布也益", but are officially classified by the Chinese government as ethnic Zhuang.

== Distribution ==
The Bouyei primarily live in the Qianxinan and Qiannan prefectures of southern Guizhou Province, as well as in Yunnan and Sichuan provinces and the Guangxi Zhuang Autonomous Region. Economic migration has also led to Bouyei communities in coastal provinces such as Zhejiang and Guangdong.

In Vietnam, they are located in Mường Khương District of Lào Cai and Quản Bạ District of Hà Giang Province.

=== In China by province ===
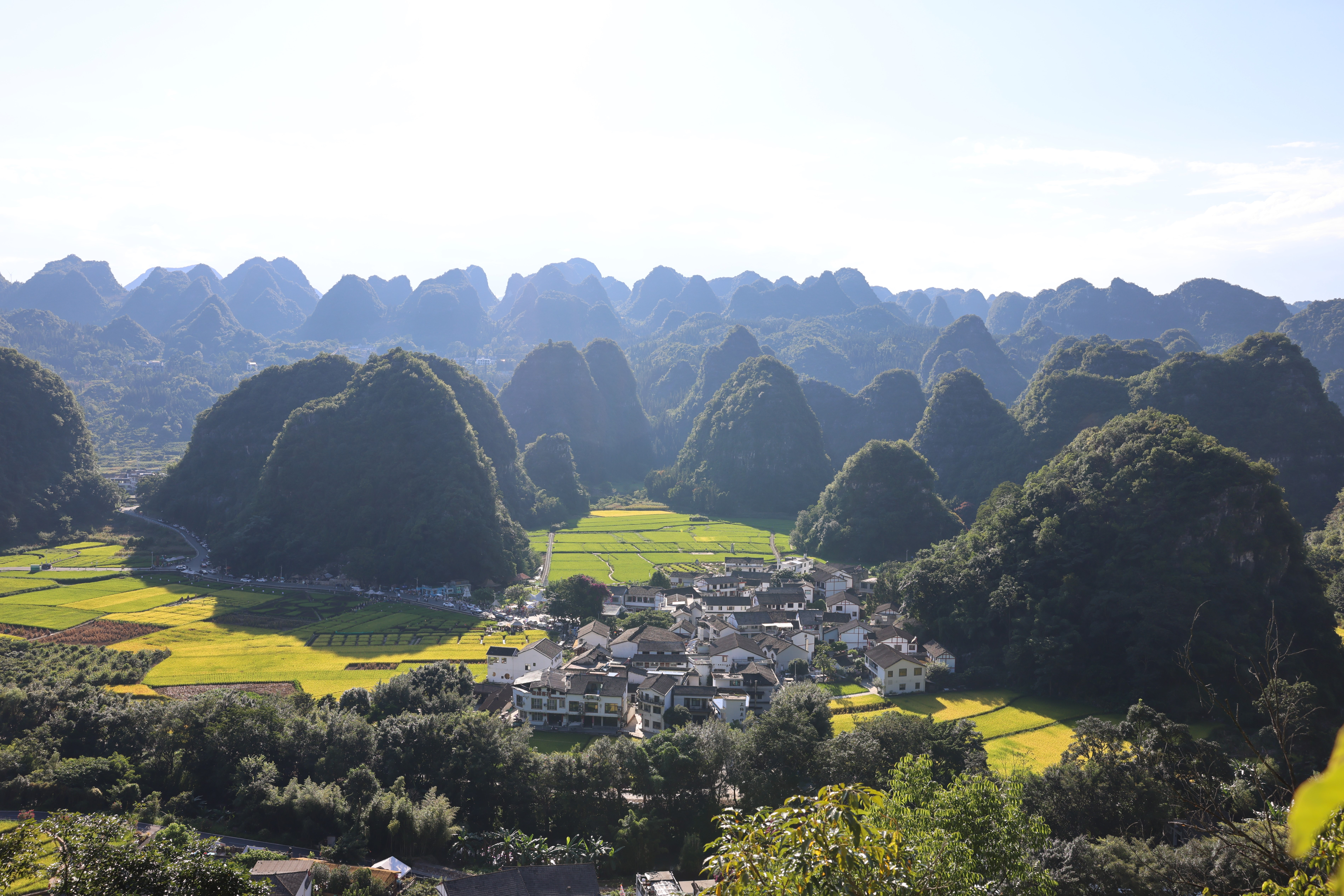
Xingyi, the seat of Qianxinan Bouyei and Miao Autonomous Prefecture, Guizhou

The Census of 2020 recorded 3,576,752 Bouyei in China.

Provincial Distribution of the Bouyei, from the 2020 census

Province-level division	Bouyei Population	% of China's Bouyei Population
Guizhou Province	2,710,606	75.8%
Zhejiang Province	313,023	8.7%
Guangdong Province	229,366	6.4%
Yunnan Province	68,140	1.9%
Fujian Province	48,893	1.4%
Jiangsu Province	40,073	1.1%
Guangxi Zhuang Autonomous Region	31,303	0.9%
Sichuan Province	16,829	0.5%
Other	118,519	3.3%

=== In China by county ===
(Only includes counties or county-equivalents containing >0.1% of China's Bouyei population.)

County-level distribution of the Bouyei, from the 2000 Chinese census
Province	Prefecture	County	Bouyei Population	% of China's Bouyei Population
Guizhou	Qiannan Buyei and Miao	Dushan (独山县)	194,468	6.54%
Guizhou	Qiannan Buyei and Miao	Duyun (都匀市)	190,347	6.41%
Guizhou	Qiannan Buyei and Miao	Wangmo (望谟县)	174,806	5.88%
Guizhou	Qiannan Buyei and Miao	Luodian (罗甸县)	158,494	5.33%
Guizhou	Qianxinan Buyei and Miao	Ceheng (册亨县)	158,019	5.32%
Guizhou	Qianxinan Buyei and Miao	Anlong (安龙县)	139,930	4.71%
Guizhou	Qiannan Buyei and Miao	Huishui (惠水县)	135,943	4.58%
Guizhou	Anshun	Zhenning Buyei and Miao (镇宁布依族苗族自治县)	131,962	4.44%
Guizhou	Qianxinan Buyei and Miao	Zhenfeng (贞丰县)	125,058	4.21%
Guizhou	Qianxinan Buyei and Miao	Xingyi (兴义市)	124,901	4.2%
Guizhou	Qiannan Buyei and Miao	Pingtang (平塘县)	107,473	3.62%
Guizhou	Qiannan Buyei and Miao	Libo (荔波县)	93,681	3.15%
Guizhou	Qiannan Buyei and Miao	Guiding (贵定县)	92,607	3.12%
Guizhou	Anshun	Ziyun Miao and Buyei (紫云苗族布依族自治县)	86,513	2.91%
Guizhou	Qiannan Buyei and Miao	Changshun (长顺县)	81,022	2.73%
Guizhou	Anshun	Guanling Buyei and Miao (关岭布依族苗族自治县)	68,967	2.32%
Guizhou	Qianxinan Buyei and Miao	Qinglong (晴隆县)	64,001	2.15%
Guizhou	Anshun	Xixiu (西秀区)	62,497	2.1%
Guizhou	Qianxinan Buyei and Miao	Xingren (兴仁县)	50,210	1.69%
Guizhou	Qiannan Buyei and Miao	Sandu Shui (三都水族自治县)	49,877	1.68%
Guizhou	Guiyang	Huaxi (花溪区)	41,446	1.4%
Guizhou	Liupanshui	Shuicheng (水城县)	41,255	1.39%
Guizhou	Liupanshui	Liuzhi (六枝特区)	35,772	1.2%
Guizhou	Qiannan Buyei and Miao	Longli (龙里县)	34,259	1.15%
Guizhou	Qiandongnan Miao and Dong	Majiang (麻江县)	33,958	1.14%
Guizhou	Anshun	Pingba (平坝县)	29,452	0.99%
Yunnan	Qujing	Luoping (罗平县)	25,152	0.85%
Guizhou	Guiyang	Qingzhen (清镇市)	25,017	0.84%
Guizhou	Qianxinan Buyei and Miao	Pu'an (普安县)	23,639	0.8%
Guizhou	Guiyang	Wudang (乌当区)	23,597	0.79%
Guizhou	Guiyang	Kaiyang (开阳县)	22,611	0.76%
Guizhou	Guiyang	Nanming (南明区)	20,608	0.69%
Guizhou	Qiannan Buyei and Miao	Fuquan (福泉市)	19,520	0.66%
Guizhou	Bijie	Qianxi (黔西县)	17,447	0.59%
Guizhou	Liupanshui	Pan (盘县)	16,072	0.54%
Guizhou	Guiyang	Baiyun (白云区)	15,116	0.51%
Guizhou	Anshun	Puding (普定县)	15,083	0.51%
Guizhou	Bijie	Zhijin (织金县)	14,512	0.49%
Guizhou	Guiyang	Yunyan (云岩区)	14,293	0.48%
Guizhou	Guiyang	Xiaohe (小河区)	12,138	0.41%
Guizhou	Bijie	Weining Yi, Hui, and Miao (威宁彝族回族苗族自治县)	7,484	0.25%
Guizhou	Bijie	Nayong (纳雍县)	7,222	0.24%
Guangxi	Hechi	Nandan (南丹县)	6,822	0.23%
Guizhou	Guiyang	Xiuwen (修文县)	6,397	0.22%
Yunnan	Wenshan Zhuang and Miao	Maguan (马关县)	6,085	0.21%
Guangdong	Dongguan	none	5,584	0.19%
Guizhou	Bijie	Dafang (大方县)	5,294	0.18%
Guizhou	Liupanshui	Zhongshan (钟山区)	4,075	0.14%
Guizhou	Bijie	Jinsha (金沙县)	3,804	0.13%
Yunnan	Kunming	Guandu (官渡区)	3,582	0.12%
Yunnan	Zhaotong	Qiaojia (巧家县)	3,063	0.1%

=== In Vietnam ===
In Vietnam, the Bố Y are recognized as one in 54 official ethnic groups. They mainly live in two localities: Mường Khương district of Lào Cai province (Tu Dí subgroup) and Quản Bạ district of Hà Giang province.

Province-level distribution of the Bố Y, from the 2009 census
Province	Bố Y Population	% of Vietnam's Bố Y Population
Lào Cai	1,398	61.5%
Hà Giang	808	35.5%
Other	67	2.9%

== Language ==
The Bouyei speak the Bouyei language, which is very close to Standard Zhuang. There is a dialect continuum between these two. The Bouyei language has its own written form, created by linguists in the 1950s based on the Latin alphabet and with spelling conventions similar to the Pinyin system that had been devised to romanise Mandarin Chinese.

Many Bố Y people in Vietnam have shifted to speaking Southwestern Mandarin or Tày language.

== History ==
The Bouyei are the native Tai peoples of the plains of Guizhou. They are one of the oldest peoples of China, living in the area for more than 2,000 years. During the Spring and Autumn Period (770–476 BCE), the ancestors of Bouyei lived in Zangke (modern Guizhou), connecting with the state of Qi. The area, part of Jingzhou's southwest, was called "Nanman" and included states like Zangke, centered in Yelang City (modern Anshun). Prior to the establishment of the Tang dynasty, the Bouyei and Zhuang were linked together; the differences between both ethnic groups grew greater and from year 900 already they were two different groups. The Tang set up feudal systems in Bouyei areas, but uprisings occurred in 812 CE. In the Song Dynasty in 1044 CE, Bouyei from Libo joined a rebellion in Guangxi. The Yuan dynasty introduced the tusi (chieftain) system, and in 1301 CE, Bouyei and others rebelled against Yuan rule. The Ming dynasty established Guizhou as a province in 1413, but faced Bouyei-led rebellions. The Qing dynasty abolished the system of local heads and commanded in its place to officials of the army which caused a change in the local economy; from then on, the land was in the hands of a few landowners, which caused the population to revolt. During the Nanlong Rebellion (南笼起义) of 1797 led by Wang Nangxian, the Bouyei underwent a strong repression that caused many of them to emigrate to Vietnam.

The 1911 Xinhai Revolution ended Qing rule, and from 1912 to 1921, Yunnan warlords controlled Guizhou. Communist influence grew in Bouyei areas in Guizhou in the 1930s, with the Chinese Red Army liberating parts of Libo in 1930 and establishing a revolutionary base there by 1933. The Red Army passed through Bouyei areas during the 1935 Long March. After the founding of the People's Republic of China in 1949, Bouyei autonomous regions Qianxinan and Qiannan were established in 1982 and 1956 respectively.

== Culture ==
Many Bouyei are agricultural farmers who commonly cultivate crops for consumption or sale like rice, millet, wheat, potatoes, maize, cocoa, tea, silk and many other types of crops. The Bouyei have also played a major role as intermediate merchants in the region. Due to changing economies, the Bouyei engage in both small-scale and large-scale commercial or business operations.

Traditional Bouyei handicrafts and batiks are renowned throughout the region. The Bouyei celebrate many festivals, both native and those derived from Han culture. One native festival is called the Ox King's Day (牛王节) on April 8, an annual celebration meant to honor oxen and their contribution to agricultural activities. June 6 is an important traditional Buyei holiday for ancestral worship. The story behind this tradition exists. According to Bouyei mythology, after Pangu became an expert in rice farming after creating the world, he married the daughter of the Dragon King, and their union gave rise to the Buyei people.

The daughter of the Dragon King and Pangu had a son named Xinheng (新横). When Xinheng disrespected his mother, she returned to heaven and never came down, despite the repeated pleas of her husband and son. Pangu was forced to remarry and eventually died on the sixth day of the sixth month of the lunar calendar.

Xinheng's stepmother treated him badly and almost killed him. When Xinheng threatened to destroy her rice harvest, she realized her mistake. She made peace with him and they went on to pay their respects to Pangu annually on the sixth day of the sixth month of the lunar calendar.

There are Christian churches among the Bouyei ethnic group in China. Most of them are in Guizhou and Yunnan. There is Catholic influence. Catholicism entered Guizhou in 1714, with missionaries spreading the faith among Bouyei communities and creating a Latin-based Bouyei language script by 1797 and 1800 to aid religious education. The introduction of Catholicism also led to anti-Catholic sentiment among the Bouyei community. In 1879, the Roman Catholic Diocese of Nanlong was established in Nanlong (now Anlong County).

== Notable Bouyei people ==
- Cen Nanqin (岑南琴), slalom canoeist
- Guo Jian (郭健), artist
- Huang Xiaoyun (黃霄雲), singer and actress
- Wang Nangxian, leader of the anti-Manchu White Lotus Rebellion
- Xiao Sha (肖莎), gymnast
- Cheng Lianzhen (郑幺妹), bandit leader and politician
- Meng Sufen (蒙素芬), politician
- Lu Ruiguang (陆瑞光), revolutionary

== See also ==
- Bouyei churches
- List of ethnic groups in China
- List of ethnic groups in Vietnam
