= Bouyei language =

Northern Tai language of Southern China

Bouyei
- Giay (Yay)
- Haausqyaix
- Native to: China (Guizhou, Yunnan and Sichuan Provinces); Vietnam
- Ethnicity: Bouyei, Giay
- Native speakers: (2.7 million cited 2000 census)
- Language family: Kra–Dai: Tai; Northern Tai; Bouyei
- Writing system: Latin, Sawndip

Language codes
- ISO 639-3: pcc
- Glottolog: bouy1240
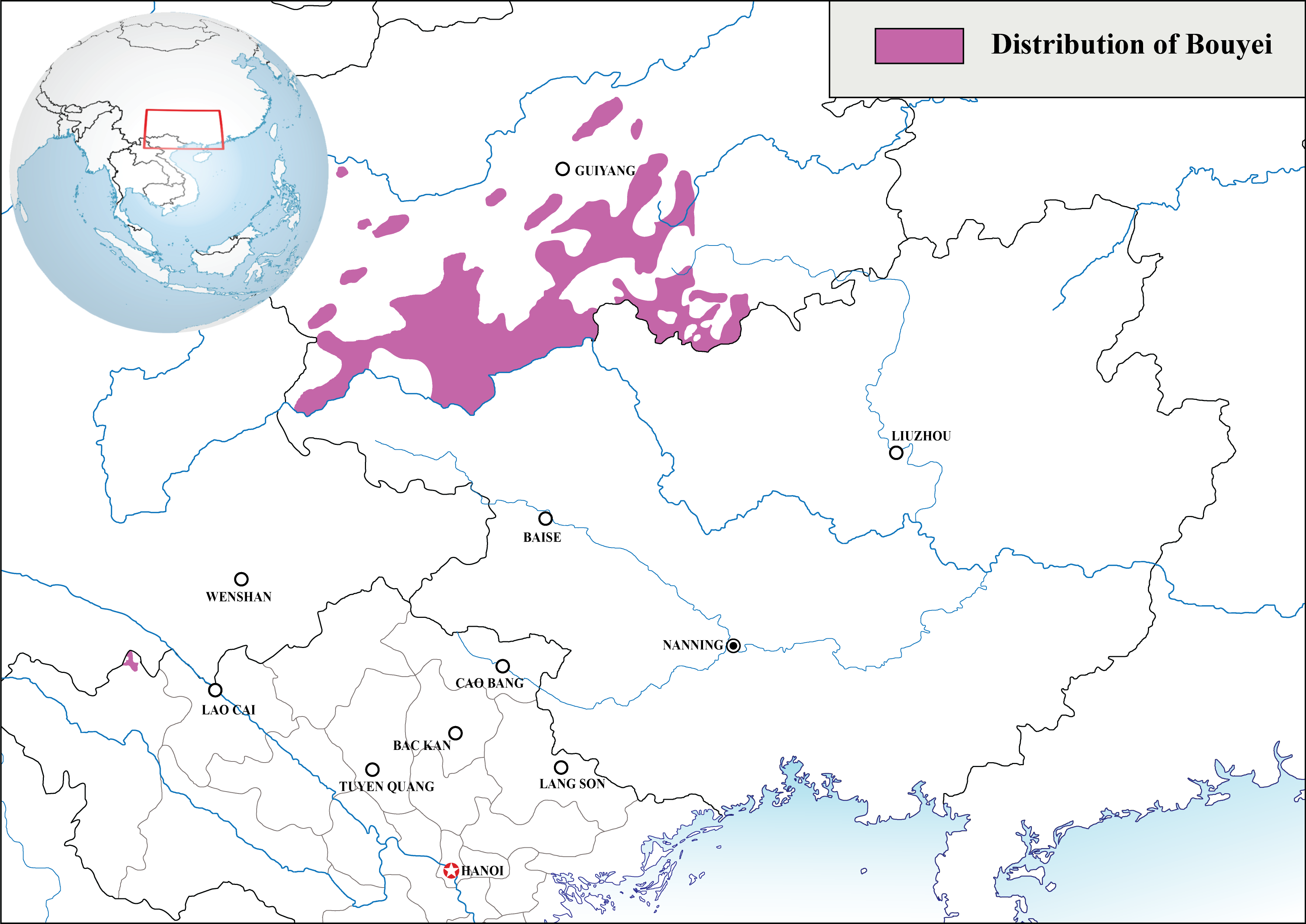
- Geographic distribution of Bouyei language

The Bouyei language (autonym: Haausqyaix, also spelled Buyi, Buyei or Puyi; Chinese: 布依语; pinyin: Bùyīyǔ; Vietnamese: tiếng Bố Y or tiếng Giáy) is a language spoken by the Bouyei ethnic group of Southern Guizhou Province, China. Classified as a member of the Northern Tai group in the Tai language branch of the Tai–Kadai language family, the language has over 2.5 million native speakers and is also used by the Giay people (Vietnamese: Giáy) in some parts of Vietnam. There are native speakers living in France and the United States as well, who emigrated from China or Vietnam. About 98% of the native speakers are in China.

Bouyei's characteristics are similar to the other members of its language branch. It is generally monosyllabic and word order and particles are the main forms of grammar. Bouyei's syllable initials match up closely to the other Northern Tai languages, with relatively fast simplification and merging. Bouyei sentences can be shown to contain many different levels of phrasing.

The contemporary Bouyei script was developed after the abandonment of the Bouyei-Zhuang Script Alliance Policy in 1981 and was designed from 1981 to 1985. It is focused and phonologically representative and takes the Wangmo County dialect as its foundation.

== Distribution ==
=== China ===
According to a 1950s survey performed by the Chinese government, the Bouyei language as spoken in Guizhou can be divided into three general dialect groups (Snyder 2008).

1. The Southern Guizhou (Qian) group – the largest of the three – from the Qianxinan Bouyei and Miao Autonomous Prefecture, which is mostly intelligible with the Guibian and Guibei Zhuang dialects. This vernacular is spoken in the counties of Wangmo, Ceheng, Luodian, Dushan, Libo, Duyun, Pingtang, Zhenfeng, Anlong, Xingren, and Xinyi.
2. The Central Guizhou (Qian) group – next most spoken of the three – which is spread throughout Qiannan Buyei and Miao Autonomous Prefecture and the suburbs of Guiyang, and is partially intelligible with the Southern Guizhou dialects (it is very similar to the Zhuang dialects of northern Guangxi). This vernacular is spoken in the counties of Longli, Guiding, Qingzhen, Pingba, Kaiyang, Guiyang, and Anshun.
3. The Western Guizhou (Qian) dialects – the least spoken of the three – which is spoken in the counties of Zhenning, Guanling, Ziyun, Qinglong, Pu'an, Liuzhi, Panxian, Shuicheng, Bijie, and Weining. The western dialects show more unique features than the other two groups. Some western dialects have aspirated stops, which is an uncommon feature in northern Tai languages (Snyder 2008).

Wu, Snyder, & Liang (2007) is the most comprehensive Bouyei survey to date, and covers the following data points.

Qiannan Bouyei and Miao Autonomous Prefecture

- Guyang, Changshun County (鼓扬镇)
- Nanzhai, Dushan County (难寨村)
- Jichang, Dushan County (基长镇)
- Fuxi, Duyun County (富溪村)
- Gonggu Township, Guiding County (巩固乡), now merged
- Danggu, Huishui County (党古村)
- Fucun, Libo County (福村)
- Yangchang, Longli County (羊场镇)
- Luokun, Luodian County (罗甸县罗悃)
- Poqiu, Luodian County (罗甸县坡球)
- Xiliang Township, Pingtang County (西凉乡), now merged
- Zhangbu Township, Pingtang County (掌布乡)

Qianxinan Bouyei and Miao Autonomous Prefecture

- Pingle Township, Anlong County (平乐乡), now merged
- Huarong, Ceheng County (册亨县花冗)
- Zitang, Qinglong County (紫塘村)
- Fuxing, Wangmo County (复兴镇)
- Bajie, Xingyi County (巴结镇)
- Mingu, Zhenfeng County (珉谷镇)

Anshun City

- Huangla Buyei and Miao Ethnic Township, Anshun (黄腊布依族苗族乡)
- Banle, Zhenning County (镇宁县板乐)
- Shitouzhai, Zhenning County (镇宁县石头寨)
- Huohua Township, Ziyun County (火花乡)
- Nonghe, Ziyun County (弄河村)

Liuzhi Special District

- Fa'er Buyei, Miao, and Yi Ethnic Township, Shuicheng County (发耳布依族苗族彝族乡)

The Yei Zhuang varieties of Wenshan Prefecture, Yunnan are closely related to the Bouyei varieties of Guizhou. Many other languages outside China with the names "Yei", "Yay", "Yoy", are also closely related.

=== Vietnam ===
Bouyei is also spoken in northern Vietnam by several groups, the Bouyei people of Muong Khuong District of Lào Cai Province and in Quan Ba District of Ha Giang Province and the Giáy. Edmondson and Gregerson (2001) has determined their language to be most similar to the Bouyei dialects of southwest Guizhou. The Giáy are an officially recognized group in Vietnam who now number nearly 50,000. Some household registries of the Giáy of Vietnam indicate that their ancestors had left Guizhou 160 years ago during the Qing dynasty, and traveled overland to southern Yunnan and then Vietnam (Edmondson & Gregerson 2001). This coincides with the Miao Rebellion (1854–73) of Guizhou. The Giáy are found in the following locations of Vietnam.

- Lào Cai province
  - Tả Van village near Sa Pa
  - Bát Xát District
  - Mường Khương District
  - Bảo Yên District
- Hà Giang Province
  - Yên Minh District
  - Đồng Văn District
- Lai Châu Province
  - Mường Tè District
  - Phong Thổ District
- Cao Bằng Province
  - Bảo Lạc District

Some Giày are in Yên Bái Province.

The Giáy of Mường Khương District of Lào Cai who call themselves Tu Dí [thu zi] can only speak a form of Chinese, and no Giáy. Their autonym comes from their ancestral place of origin, which is Duyun of Guizhou province, China. According to their household records, they had arrived in Maguan County and in Honghe Prefecture about 200 years ago. Similarly, some Giáy of Vietnam report that they have relatives still living in Hekou, Yunnan province, China (Edmondson & Gregerson 2001).

The Pu Nả people of Tam Đường District, Lai Châu Province, Vietnam call themselves the Vần Nả (with vần meaning 'people'), and number about 5,000 individuals (Lò 2012:11–20). They are also called Quý Châu (Guizhou 贵州), Sa Quý Châu, Củi Chu, Pu Y, or Pâu Thìn. The Pu Nả live in the following villages of Tam Đường District (Lò 2012:18).

- Bản Giang commune
  - bản Coc Pa
  - bản Giang
  - bản Nà Bỏ
  - bản Nà Sài
  - bản Nà Cơ
  - bản Tẩn Phủ Nhiêu
- Thèn Xin commune
  - bản Lở Thàng
  - Thèn Xin
- San Thàng commune
  - bản Tả Xin Chải
  - Xéo Xin Chải
  - Phan Lỉn

The Yay language described by William J. Gedney is in fact the Giáy dialect of Mường Hum, Bát Xát District, Lào Cai (Edmondson & Gregerson 2001). There are also other related Northern Tai languages spoken in Vietnam as well, such Bố Y, Nhang, and Quy Châu (possibly closely related to Tai Mène of Laos). The Bố Y had originally came from around Wangmo County in southwestern Guizhou. Some subgroups of Bố Y call themselves the Pu Na or Pu Thin, meaning 'people of the paddy field'.

=== Laos ===
There are also some speakers in Laos. In Laos, the Giáy people are called Yang, which is also used four various Rau peoples living there.

The Yang people, also spelled Nhang, are located in Louang Namtha Province, Oudomxay Province and Phongsaly Province. This three provinces are bordered by Yunnan, and one border Vietnam.

== Phonology ==
		Labial		Dental/Alveolar		(Alveolo-) Palatal	Velar	
		plain	pal.	plain	sibilant	(Alveolo-) Palatal	plain	labial
Nasal		m ⟨m⟩	mʲ ⟨my⟩	n ⟨n⟩		ɲ ⟨ny⟩	ŋ ⟨ng⟩	ŋʷ ⟨ngv⟩
Plosive/ Affricate	tenuis	p ⟨b⟩	pʲ ⟨by⟩	t ⟨d⟩	(ts) ⟨z⟩	tɕ ⟨j⟩	k ⟨g⟩	kʷ ⟨gv⟩
Plosive/ Affricate	aspirated	(pʰ) ⟨p⟩		(tʰ) ⟨t⟩	(tsʰ) ⟨c⟩	(tɕʰ) ⟨q⟩	(kʰ) ⟨k⟩	
Plosive/ Affricate	implosive	ɓ ⟨mb⟩		ɗ ⟨nd⟩				
Continuant	voiceless	f ⟨f⟩		(ɬ) ⟨sl⟩	s ~ θ ⟨s⟩	ɕ ⟨x⟩	x ⟨h⟩	
Continuant	voiced	v ~ w ⟨v⟩		l ⟨l⟩	z ~ ð ⟨r⟩	j ⟨y⟩	(ɣ) ⟨hr⟩	
Continuant	glottalic	ˀv ~ ˀw ⟨qv⟩				ˀj ⟨qy⟩		

- /pʰ tʰ ts tsʰ tɕʰ kʰ/ are found only in Chinese loanwords.
- /ɬ ɣ/ occur only in certain dialects.
- /v/ is realized as [w] before /u/.
- An absent consonant may produce a glottal sound /ʔ/. /ʔ/ is also heard as a final sound.

=== Vowels ===
	Front	Central	Back
Close	i	ɯ	u
Close-mid	e		o oː
Open-mid	e	ɐ	ɔ
Open	(æ)	a aː	

- /i u/ may be realized as near-close [ɪ ʊ].
- /ɯ/ is an unrounded back vowel.
- /a o/ have a length contrast.
- /æ/ is found in the dialects of Anshun, Qinglong, Shuicheng, Zhenning, and Ziyun.

=== Finals ===
The following chart lists all the finals in Bouyei as represented in IPA and in its orthography.

		/a/~/aː/-	/ɐ/	/o/-	/ɔ/-	/e/-	/iə/-	/i/-	/uə/-	/u/-	/ɯə/-	/ɯ/-
"Level" syllables	-∅	a /a/		o /o/		ee /e/~[ɛ]	ie /iə/	i /i/	ue /uə/	u /u/	ea /ɯə/	e /ɯ/~[ɨ]
"Level" syllables	-/i/	aai /aːi/	ai /ɐi/	oi /oi/								ei /ɯi/
"Level" syllables	-/u/	aau /aːu/	au /ɐu/			eeu /eu/		iu /iu/				
"Level" syllables	-/ɯ/		ae /ɐɯ/									
"Level" syllables	-/m/	aam /aːm/	am /ɐm/	oom /om/	om /ɔm/	eem /em/	iam /iəm/	im /im/	uam /uəm/	um /um/	eam /ɯəm/	
"Level" syllables	-/n/	aan /aːn/	an /ɐn/	oon /on/	on /ɔn/	een /en/	ian /iən/	in /in/	uan /uən/	un /un/	ean /ɯən/	en /ɯn/~[ən]
"Level" syllables	-/ŋ/	aang /aːŋ/	ang /ɐŋ/	oong /oŋ/	ong /ɔŋ/	eeng /eŋ/	iang /iəŋ/	ing /iŋ/	uang /uəŋ/	ung /uŋ/	eang /ɯəŋ/	eng /ɯŋ/~[əŋ]
"Entering" syllables	-/p/	aab /aːp/	ab /ɐp/	oob /op/	ob /ɔp/	eeb /ep/	iab /iəp/	ib /ip/	uab /uəp/	ub /up/	eab /ɯəp/	
"Entering" syllables	-/t/	aad /aːt/	ad /ɐt/	ood /ot/	od /ɔt/	eed /et/	iad /iət/	id /it/	uad /uət/	ud /ut/	ead /ɯət/	ed /ɯt/~[ət]
"Entering" syllables	-/k/		ag /ɐk/		og /ɔk/	eeg /ek/		ig /ik/		ug /uk/		eg /ɯk/~[ək]

- The endings ⟨-er⟩ /ɚ/, ⟨-ao⟩ /au/, ⟨-ou⟩ /əu/, ⟨-ia⟩ /ia/, ⟨-io⟩ /io/, ⟨-iao⟩ /iɐu/, ⟨-ua⟩ /ua/, ⟨-uai⟩ /uɐi/, and ⟨-ui⟩ /ui/ are used in writing Chinese loanwords.

=== Tones ===
Bouyei has six tones, corresponding to the eight sheng of Middle Chinese: all six in open syllables or with a final /n/ or /ŋ/, reduced to two "entering" tones with a final stop.

#	Name	Contour	Marking letter	Corresponding Southwest Mandarin Tone	Loanword Marking letter
1	Dark level	˨˦	l	Departing	q
2	Light level	˩	z		
3	Dark rising	˥˧	c	Rising	j
4	Light rising	˧˩	x	Light level	f
5	Dark departing	˧˥	s		
6	Light departing	˧	h	Dark level	y
7	Dark entering	˧˥	t		
8	Light entering	˧	none		

Marking letters are placed at the end of syllables to indicate tone. Loanword marking letters y, f, j, and q match with Mandarin tones 1, 2, 3, and 4 respectively.

=== Phonological shifts ===
Bouyei shows de-voicing of Proto-Tai–Kadai's voiced consonants (*b → /p/, *d → /t/, *ɡ → /k/), and loss of aspiration.

Proto-Tai–Kadai	*ˀn, *n̥	*t	*ˀd	*dʱ, *d	*n
Bouyei	n	t	ɗ	t	n

Dark tone	Light tone

Proto-Tai–Kadai's tones experienced a splitting into modern Bouyei, shown in the following table.

Proto-Tai–Kadai	*ˀn, *n̥	*t	*ˀd	*dʱ, *d	*n
PTK Level tone	Dark level			Light level	
PTK Rising tone	Dark rising		Light rising		
PTK Departing tone	Dark departing			Light departing	
PTK Entering tone	Dark entering			Light entering	

== Scripts ==
=== Ancient Bouyei script ===
Ancient Bouyei writing was created by borrowing elements from Chinese characters or by mimicking their forms, and is similar to Sawndip. Items collected were mostly Shaman's books of the Buyi ancestors, which were used to select auspicious days, lucky numbers and directions, and divination. The scriptures also produced Nuo books and literary works. The Nuo scripts have been widely circulated among the Buyi people in Libo region for more than a thousand years to praise goodness, condemn evil, advocate filiality, and to promote truth, kindness and beauty; and these have become the code of conduct among the local Buyei people. The epic poem Wang Yulian was a literary work that is believed to be the retelling of a Chinese story in Buyei language. Its manual copies are popular in Zhexiang Township, Wangmo County in Buyei and Miao Autonomous Prefecture in Southwest Guizhou.

=== Old Modern Bouyei ===
In November 1956, a scientific conference was held in Guiyang to discuss the creation and implementation of a Latin-based alphabet for Bouyei. The result was a script similar some Zhuang romanizations that used the Longli County dialect as its base. The script was approved by the Chinese government and was put into use in 1957, though its use ceased in 1960.

=== Current Bouyei script ===
In 1981, a conference on Bouyei history revised the script developed in 1956 in an attempt to make it more practical and phonologically representative of Wangmo County speech. It also was approved by the Chinese government, and was adopted on an experimental basis in 1982. Feedback was largely positive, and the script was officially brought into use in March 1985 and continues to be used to the present.

Old and current Bouyei Romanization comparisons
Old	Current	IPA	Old	Current	IPA	Old	Current	IPA	Old	Current	IPA	Old	Current	IPA
b	b	/p/	ƃ	mb	/ɓ/	m	m	/m/	f	f	/f/	v	v, qv	/v, ˀv/
c	z	/ts/							s	s	/s/	r	r	/z/
d	d	/t/	ƌ	nd	/ɗ/	n	n	/n/				l	l	/l/
g	g	/k/	gv	gv	/kʷ/	ŋ	ng	/ŋ/	ŋv	ngv	/ŋʷ/	h	h	/x/
gy	j	/tɕ/				ny	ny	/nʲ/	x	x	/ɕ/	y	y, qy	/j, ˀj/
by	by	/pʲ/				my	my	/mʲ/						

Old	Zhuang	Bouyei	IPA	Old	Zhuang	Bouyei	IPA	Old	Zhuang	Bouyei	IPA	Old	Zhuang	Bouyei	IPA
a	a	aa	/aː/	ə	ae	a	/a/	e	e	ee	/e/	i	i	i	/i/
o	o	oo	/oː/	ө	oe	o	/o/	u	u	u	/u/	ɯ	w	e	/ɯ/

Tone marking letters
#	Old	Zhuang	Bouyei	Yangchang dialect	Fuxing dialect
1	none	none	l, q	35	24
2	ƨ	z	z	11	11
3	ɜ	j	c, j	13	53
4	ч	x	x, f	31	11
5	ƽ	q	s	33	35
6	ƅ	h	h, y	53	33
7	(p, t, k)	(p, t, k)	(b, d, g)t	33 (long), 35 (short)	35
8	(b, d, g)	(b, d, g)	(b, d, g)	53 (long), 11 (short)	33
