= Xima =

Xima may refer to these places in China:

== Towns ==
- Xima, Longli County (洗马), in Longli County, Guizhou
- Xima, Meitan County (洗马), in Meitan County, Guizhou
- Xima, Xishui County (洗马), in Xishui County, Hubei
- Xima, Yunnan (昔马), in Yingjiang County, Yunnan

== Townships ==
- Xima Township, Hunan (洗马乡), in Hongjiang, Hunan
- Xima Township, Shanxi (西马乡), in Yushe County, Shanxi

== Subdistricts ==
- Xima Subdistrict, Jieyang (西马街道), in Rongcheng District, Jieyang, Guangdong
- Xima Subdistrict, Wuhan (西马街道), in Jiang'an District, Wuhan, Hubei

== Other uses ==
- Xima, the Mozambican term for ugali

== See also ==
- Qiema (郄马), a town in Shijiazhuang, Hebei
