= Bouyei =

Bouyei can refer to:

- Bouyei language, a Tai language spoken in Vietnam and southern China
- Bouyei people, an ethnic group of Vietnam and southern China
- Giáy people, an ethnic group of Vietnam, speakers of Bouyei
