= Qianxinan Television =

Chinese satellite TV channel in Qianxinan Prefecture, Guizhou

- Country: China
- Headquarters: Xingyi city, Qianxinan Bouyei and Miao Autonomous Prefecture, Guizhou Province, China

Programming
- Languages: Mandarin, Bouyei and Miao

Ownership
- Owner: Qianxinan Prefecture Radio and Television Bureau

History
- Launched: 2011

Links
- Website: Official website

Qianxinan Television
- Traditional Chinese: 黔西南電視台
- Simplified Chinese: 黔西南电视台
Transcriptions
Standard Mandarin
- Hanyu Pinyin: Qiánxīnán Diànshìtái
- Wade–Giles: Chʻienhsinan Tienshihtʻai

Qianxinan Television or QXNTV (Note: Chinese: 黔西南电视台; pinyin: Qiánxīnán Diànshìtái, also rendered as Chienshinan Television) is a Chinese cable television station based in Qianxinan Bouyei and Miao Autonomous Prefecture, Guizhou, China. It operates under the Qianxinan Prefecture Radio and Television Bureau and holds independent legal entity status.

== History ==
In 2011, pursuant to Qianxinan prefecture government document No. 88 (2002), Xingyi City Television Station was merged with the original Qianxinan Television to form the current Qianxinan Television. It is classified as a deputy county-level public institution with 98 allocated staff positions. The station developed a public affairs program, Jinzhou New Vision, and its official website, both launched on July 1, 2010. It also controls three cultural industry companies and integrates traditional and emerging media to serve as a regional media hub.

== Structure ==
The station is led by one director, three deputy directors, one chief editor, and two deputy chief editors. It employs 20 administrative staff, 73 technical professionals, and five support workers. As of present, the station has 104 personnel, including 83 permanent employees.

== Broadcasting ==
Qianxinan Television operates multiple media platforms:

Media platform	English name	Chinese name
Radio	FM 107.9 MHz (News Comprehensive Radio), FM 88.3 MHz (Traffic and Tourism Radio)	新闻综合广播, 交通旅游广播
Television	Comprehensive Channel, Digital Channel, Digital TV Channel 13	综合频道, 公共频道, 数字电视频道13
Online	Qianxinan Network Television, Jinzhou Broadcasting Network	黔西南网络电视, 金州广播网
Mobile	Jinzhou Express, Guizhou Auto Mobile News	金州快报, 贵州汽车手机报

Its two radio signals cover a population of 6 million across parts of Guizhou, Guangxi and Yunnan. The station serves 200,000 cable digital TV subscribers and over 30,000 mobile news subscribers.
