= Xinqiao, Guizhou =

Xinqiao 新桥镇
- Town
- Interactive map of Xinqiao
- Coordinates: 25°07′19″N 105°16′41″E
- Country: People's Republic of China
- Province: Guizhou
- Autonomous prefecture: Qianxinan
- County: Anlong
- Village-level divisions: 1 residential community 8 villages
- Elevation: 1,242 m (4,075 ft)
- Time zone: UTC+8 (China Standard)
- Area code: 0859

Xinqiao (simplified Chinese: 新桥; traditional Chinese: 新橋; pinyin: Xīnqiáo; lit. 'new bridge') is a town of Anlong County in southwestern Guizhou province, China, located 17 kilometres (11 mi) west-northwest of the county seat and 38 kilometres (24 mi) east of Xingyi, both of which can be reached by China National Highway 324. As of 2011, it has one residential community (居委会) and eight villages under its administration.

== See also ==
- List of township-level divisions of Guizhou
