= Chengbei Subdistrict, Xingren =

Chengbei Subdistrict 城北街道
- Subdistrict
- Location in China
- Coordinates: 25°26′02″N 105°11′00″E
- Country: People's Republic of China
- Province: Guizhou
- Autonomous prefecture: Qianxinan
- County-level city: Xingren
- Village-level divisions: 4 residential communities 3 villages
- Elevation: 1,356 m (4,449 ft)
- Time zone: UTC+8 (China Standard)
- Postal code: 562300
- Area code: 0859

Chengbei Subdistrict (Chinese: 城北街道; pinyin: Chéngběi Jiēdào; lit. 'city north') is a subdistrict of Xingren, Guizhou, People's Republic of China. As of 2018, it has four residential communities (社区 or 居委会) and three villages under its administration.

== See also ==
- List of township-level divisions of Guizhou
