= Cheng Lianzhen =

Chinese bandit (1921–1998)

- 程莲珍
- Born: 1921; Changshun, Guizhou, Republic of China
- Died: 21 October 1998 (aged 77); Huishui, Guizhou, People's Republic of China
- Occupations: Politician, bandit
- Political party: Chinese Communist Party
- Children: 1 (daughter)

Cheng Lianzhen (Chinese: 程莲珍; pinyin: Chéng Liánzhēn; 1921 – 21 October 1998) was a Chinese communist politician. A prominent female bandit leader in southwestern China during the mid-20th century, she rose to notoriety in the turbulent years following the Chinese Civil War and the establishment of the People's Republic of China.

== Early life ==
Cheng Lianzhen was born in 1921 into a poor Bouyei family in a village at Changshun County, Guizhou. At 17, she served as a bridesmaid at a village wedding, where she caught the eye of a bandit leader determined to kidnap her. Warned by the bride, Cheng fled to Huishui County and met Chen Zhengming, a wealthy university student unhappy with his arranged marriage. The two quickly fell in love and married. Living in Chen's home, Cheng learned horseback riding and marksmanship, becoming skilled enough to shoot accurately while horse riding and developing her reputation as a bandit.

== Bandit life ==
Guizhou province, with its rugged mountains, dense forests, and remote villages, was a fertile ground for banditry during the early 20th century. The region's isolation made it difficult for central authorities to maintain control, and the poverty of its inhabitants often drove people to banditry as a means of survival. These groups operated in a decentralized manner, raiding villages, ambushing travelers, and occasionally clashing with government forces. Cheng Lianzhen emerged as a prominent bandit figure in this chaotic environment. In 1947, Chen died of acute illness and in the same year, Cheng gave birth to her daughter. On 15 November 1949, Guizhou was captured by the People's Liberation Army (PLA) following the Communist victory in the Chinese Civil War. Faced with the situation of continuous retreat, the remnants of Kuomintang forces decided to gather local bandits in Guizhou to launch a counterattack on PLA forces. Cheng encountered Luo Shaofan, a man she had once rejected due to her adherence to the Bouyei tradition of lifelong marital fidelity. Luo introduced her to Cao Shaohua, who pressured her into leading a local militia under his command. Despite her reluctance, Cheng accepted the role. Subsequently, Cheng used her influence to recruit among the Bouyei people and she participated in attacks, including an assault on the Huishui County in 1950.

In 1950, the PLA re-entered Guizhou and formed six anti-bandit units to suppress banditry in regions like Changshun and Huishui. The "Self-Salvation Army" led by Cao Shaohua, quickly collapsed, while Cheng's bandit group fled and went into hiding. Cao Shaohua was captured in a valley in Changshun County and executed in Guiyang by the PLA. However, Cheng Lianzhen and her group of several hundred bandits evaded capture by hiding in secret caves in the Lengshui River Valley in Guizhou, making them difficult to eliminate.

By late 1952, Cheng's group, feeling hopeless, surrendered to the government. Cheng, fearing execution, fled and was eventually captured in February 1953. The PLA tracked her down after arresting her associate Luo Shaofan, who revealed her location. Cheng had fled to a village in Longli County, where she married a local villager and assumed a false identity. When arrested at her home in Longli County, she pretended to be a local woman sewing on a kang, but her disguise failed. After being apprehended, she was taken to Longli County Public Security Bureau and then to Guiyang. In late March 1953, General Li Da returned to China and stopped in Beijing to report to Chinese leader Mao Zedong on his experiences in the Korean War and the progress of anti-bandit operations in the southwest. During his report, he raised the issue of Cheng Lianzhen, emphasizing the need to consider ethnic policies and her influence in the ethnic minority regions, and sought Mao's guidance on whether to execute or pardon her. After hearing the situation, Mao ordered the lenient treatment of Cheng as he thought it was rare to have a female bandit leader from an ethnic minority in China. When Li Da sought further explanation, Mao highlighted how, in the long history of China, such a remarkable figure from an ethnic minority was almost unheard of. He pointed out that even Zhuge Liang had shown great leniency by capturing and releasing Meng Huo multiple times, suggesting that the Communists could demonstrate the same level of generosity. Other than sparing her from execution due to rarity of having a female bandit leader from an ethnic minority, Mao also felt that sparing Cheng from execution could help promote unity among ethnic minorites in China, and executing her would be detrimental to the efforts of building unity among the ethnic minorites.

On 5 June 1953, the president of the local court sentenced Cheng Lianzhen to be released. After her release, she traveled to the border areas of Huishui and Changshun counties, where she persuaded hidden bandits to surrender. Within a month, 22 bandits turned themselves in. For the bandits who refused to surrender, Cheng guided PLA troops in search operations, leading to the elimination of such bandits.

== Later life ==
Following her pardon, she was allowed to settle in a Bouyei village near Huishui. In 1953, with the help of locals, she reunited with her daughter, who had been separated from her since 1947. By 1958, Cheng entered politics and became an active member of the Huishui County Political Consultative Conference. After the 3rd plenary session of the 11th Central Committee of the Chinese Communist Party, she attained enough seniority to gain a seat on the standing committee of the Huishui County Political Consultative Conference. She served in this position until her death from illness at her home in Huishui on 21 October 1998. Following her death, the Guizhou Provincial Committee of the Chinese People's Political Consultative Conference held a grand memorial service in her honor.

== In popular culture ==
The story about Cheng's life was first published in August 1989 by Bouyei writer Wang Tingzhen in Sichuan magazine Virgin Land (Chinese: 处女地; pinyin: Chǔnǚdì), titled Mao Zedong's Few Words Release the Female Bandit (Chinese: 毛泽东片言释女匪; pinyin: Máozédōng piànyán shì nǚ fěi). In 2003, Wang expanded the story into a novel The Legendary Experience of a Female Bandit Leader (Chinese: 一个女匪首的传奇经历; pinyin: Yīgè nǚ fěishǒu de chuánqí jīnglì). In 2005, the People's Liberation Army Literature and Art Publishing House released Lotus in the Storm—The Legend of the 'Female Meng Huo' Pardoned by Mao Zedong (Chinese: 风雨莲花--被毛泽东义释的"女孟获"传奇; pinyin: Fēngyǔ liánhuā--bèi máozédōng yì shì de"nǚ mèng huò"chuánqí), which was co-authored by Wang Tingzhen and Zhou Weiyi. Both books were prefaced by Wang Siming, former vice chairman of the Guizhou Provincial Political Consultative Conference and a key figure in handling Cheng Lianzhen's case, making them the only two novels to depict Cheng's history.

Cheng's life story inspired a ten-episode TV series, Female Bandit Leader (Chinese: 女匪首; pinyin: Nǚ fěishǒu), which aired in 2008. In 2009, Zhejiang Great Wall Film and Television adapted her story into a 40-episode series, Highest Amnesty (Chinese: 最高特赦; pinyin: Zuìgāo tèshè), with actress Ma Su portraying Zheng Yaomei, a character based on Cheng.
