= Ceheng County =

Ceheng County 册亨县
- County
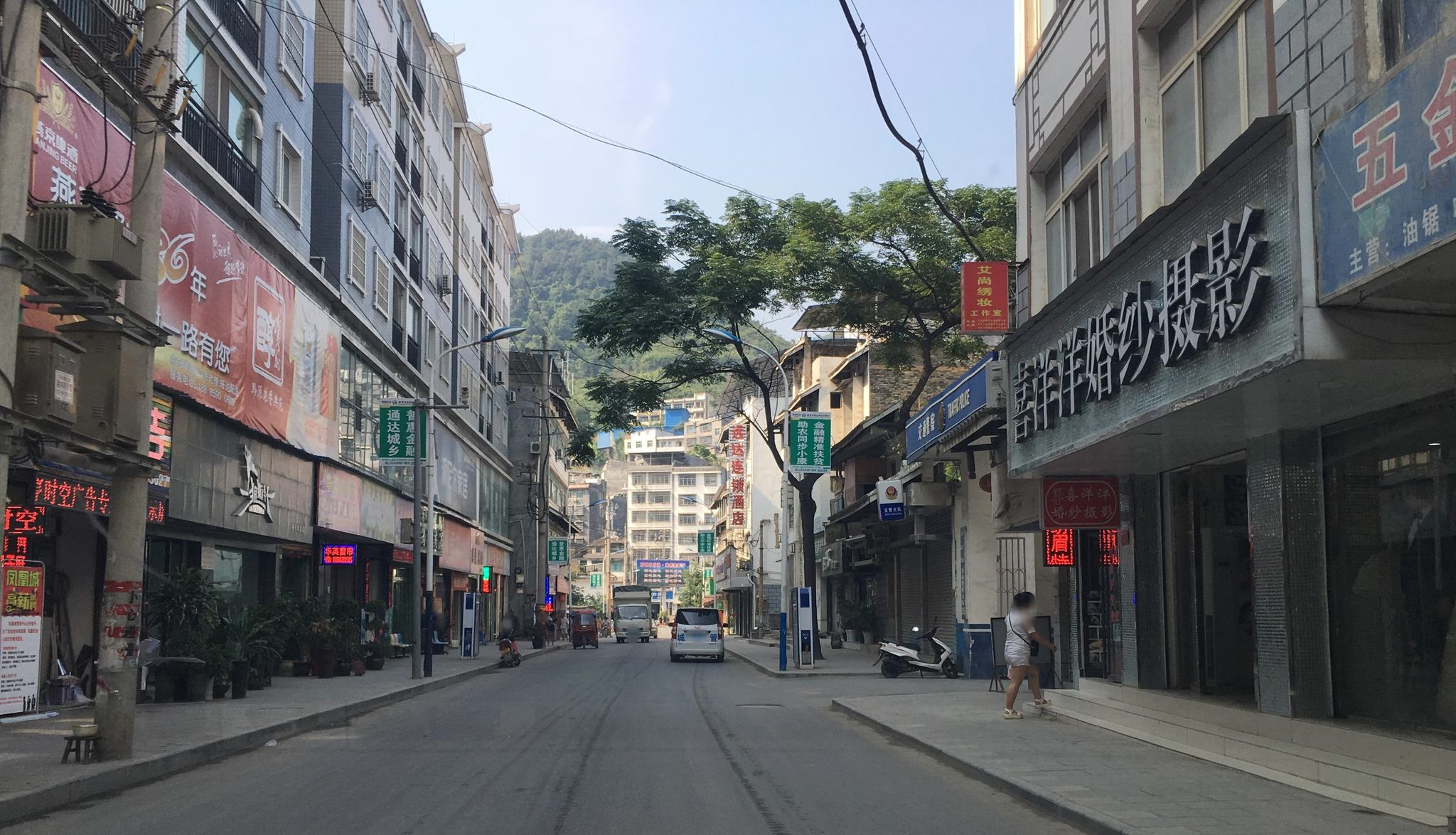

- Location of the seat in Guizhou Ceheng (Southwest China)
- Coordinates (Ceheng County government): 24°59′01″N 105°48′42″E
- Country: China
- Province: Guizhou
- Autonomous prefecture: Qianxinan
- County seat: Zhelou

Area
  - Total: 2,596.7 km^{2} (1,002.6 sq mi)

Population (2010)
  - Total: 190,379
  - Density: 73.316/km^{2} (189.89/sq mi)
- Time zone: UTC+8 (China Standard)

Ceheng County (simplified Chinese: 册亨县; traditional Chinese: 冊亨縣; pinyin: Cèhēng Xiàn) (Bouyei language: Xeehlauz xianq) is a county in the southwest of Guizhou province, China, bordering Guangxi to the south. It is under the administration of the Qianxinan Buyei and Miao Autonomous Prefecture.

Ceheng County borders Wangmo County to the east, Leye County, Tianlin County and Longlin County of Guangxi to the south, Anlong County to the west and Zhenfeng County to the north.

== Administrative divisions ==
Ceheng County is divided into 3 subdistricts, 9 towns and 1 ethnic township:

subdistricts

- Zhelou 者楼街道
- Nafu 纳福街道
- Gaoluo 高洛街道

towns

- Pomei 坡妹镇
- Rongdu 冗渡镇
- Yata 丫他镇
- Qiaoma 巧马镇
- Yangba 秧坝镇
- Shuangjiang 双江镇
- Yanjia 岩架镇
- Badu 八渡镇
- Biyou 弼佑镇

township

- Baikou 百口乡

== Climate ==
Climate data for Ceheng, elevation 585 m (1,919 ft), (1991–2020 normals, extremes 1981–2010)
Month	Jan	Feb	Mar	Apr	May	Jun	Jul	Aug	Sep	Oct	Nov	Dec	Year
Record high °C (°F)	32.2 (90.0)	36.5 (97.7)	37.4 (99.3)	40.2 (104.4)	40.0 (104.0)	37.6 (99.7)	37.7 (99.9)	38.6 (101.5)	37.6 (99.7)	34.7 (94.5)	33.7 (92.7)	30.9 (87.6)	40.2 (104.4)
Mean daily maximum °C (°F)	14.7 (58.5)	18.3 (64.9)	22.5 (72.5)	27.6 (81.7)	29.7 (85.5)	30.5 (86.9)	31.5 (88.7)	31.4 (88.5)	29.4 (84.9)	24.9 (76.8)	21.5 (70.7)	16.3 (61.3)	24.9 (76.7)
Daily mean °C (°F)	10.5 (50.9)	13.1 (55.6)	16.8 (62.2)	21.4 (70.5)	24.0 (75.2)	25.4 (77.7)	26.1 (79.0)	25.6 (78.1)	23.6 (74.5)	20.0 (68.0)	16.1 (61.0)	11.8 (53.2)	19.5 (67.2)
Mean daily minimum °C (°F)	7.9 (46.2)	9.9 (49.8)	13.3 (55.9)	17.3 (63.1)	20.0 (68.0)	22.1 (71.8)	22.8 (73.0)	22.2 (72.0)	20.2 (68.4)	17.1 (62.8)	13.0 (55.4)	9.0 (48.2)	16.2 (61.2)
Record low °C (°F)	−2.3 (27.9)	0.8 (33.4)	1.5 (34.7)	7.3 (45.1)	11.2 (52.2)	14.7 (58.5)	15.3 (59.5)	16.8 (62.2)	11.1 (52.0)	7.7 (45.9)	2.1 (35.8)	−1.6 (29.1)	−2.3 (27.9)
Average precipitation mm (inches)	27.8 (1.09)	19.7 (0.78)	41.0 (1.61)	56.2 (2.21)	170.3 (6.70)	260.2 (10.24)	226.6 (8.92)	184.1 (7.25)	133.0 (5.24)	86.8 (3.42)	39.8 (1.57)	19.9 (0.78)	1,265.4 (49.81)
Average precipitation days (≥ 0.1 mm)	11.2	10.0	11.0	11.3	13.9	16.2	16.8	15.0	11.1	12.5	8.8	8.5	146.3
Average snowy days	0.5	0.3	0	0	0	0	0	0	0	0	0	0.3	1.1
Average relative humidity (%)	79	74	72	71	74	81	82	83	82	83	80	78	78
Mean monthly sunshine hours	60.2	82.9	106.4	147.1	159.9	131.7	163.9	181.3	152.9	108.0	111.4	79.7	1,485.4
Percentage possible sunshine	18	26	28	38	39	32	39	45	42	30	34	24	33
Source: China Meteorological Administration
