= Wusha, Guizhou =

Wusha 乌沙镇
- Town
- Location in China
- Coordinates: 25°8′20″N 104°46′19″E
- Country: People's Republic of China
- Province: Guizhou
- Autonomous Prefecture: Qianxinan Buyei and Miao Autonomous Prefecture
- County-level city: Xingyi
- Time zone: UTC+8 (China Standard)

Wusha (simplified Chinese: 乌沙; traditional Chinese: 烏沙; pinyin: Wūshā) is a town of Xingyi, Guizhou, China. As of 2020, it administers Wusha Residential Community and the following eight villages:

- Niubangzi Village (牛膀子村)
- Nagu Village (纳姑村)
- Yaoshang Village (窑上村)
- Moshe Village (磨舍村)
- Mojiao Village (抹角村)
- Puti Village (普梯村)
- Daxingzhai Village (大兴寨村)
- Chajiang Village (岔江村)

== See also ==
- List of township-level divisions of Guizhou
