= Huilong, Xingren County =

Huilong 回龙镇
- Town
- Interactive map of Huilong
- Coordinates: 25°31′30″N 105°30′16″E
- Country: People's Republic of China
- Province: Guizhou
- Autonomous prefecture: Qianxinan
- County: Xingren
- Village-level divisions: 1 residential community 12 villages
- Elevation: 1,421 m (4,662 ft)
- Time zone: UTC+8 (China Standard)
- Area code: 0859

Huilong (simplified Chinese: 回龙; traditional Chinese: 回龍; pinyin: Huílóng) is a town of Xingren County in southwestern Guizhou province, China, situated 33 kilometres (21 mi) northeast of the county seat. As of 2011, it has one residential community (居委会) and 12 villages under its administration.

== See also ==
- List of township-level divisions of Guizhou
