= Odorrana anlungensis =

Conservation status
- Endangered (IUCN 3.1)

Scientific classification
- Kingdom: Animalia
- Phylum: Chordata
- Class: Amphibia
- Order: Anura
- Family: Ranidae
- Genus: Odorrana
- Species: O. anlungensis

Binomial name
- Odorrana anlungensis (Liu & Hu, 1973)

Synonyms
- Rana anlungensis Liu & Hu, 1973

Species of frog

Odorrana anlungensis is a species of frog in the family Ranidae that is endemic to China: it is only known from its type locality, Mount Longtou in Anlong County, Guizhou. Its common name is Lungtou frog or Anlung odorous frog. Little is known about this species found in shaded hill streams 2-3m wide in forested areas.

Male Odorrana anlungensis grow to a snout–vent length of 36 mm (1.4 in) and females to 64 mm (2.5 in). Tadpoles are up to 30 mm (1.2 in) in length.
