= Bảo Yên =

- Commune
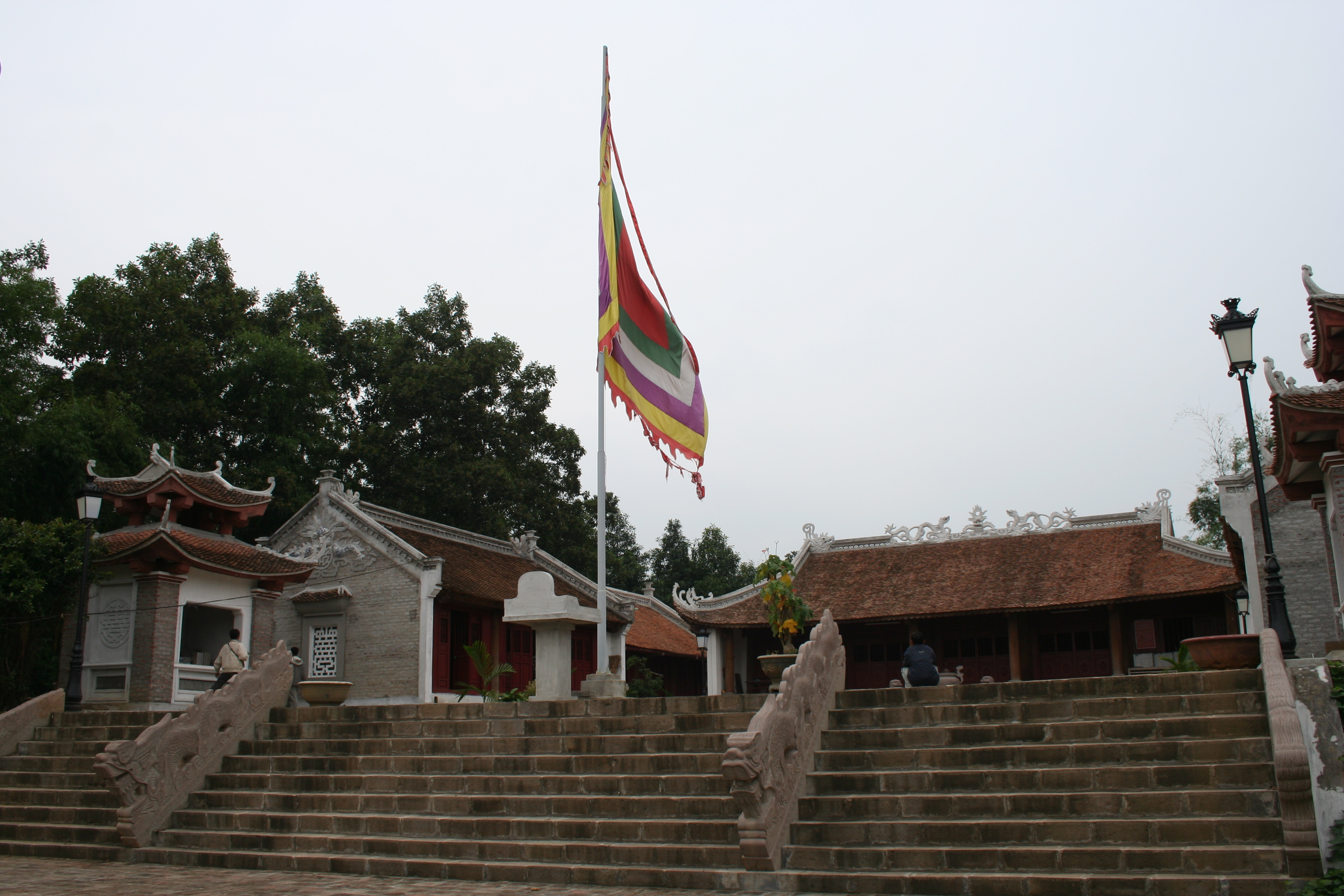
- Phúc Khánh Temple
- Interactive map of Bảo Yên
- Coordinates: 22.282723211730172°N 104.65194759787389°E
- Country: Vietnam
- Province: Lào Cai
- Region: Northwest
- Established: 2025

Area
  - Total: 119.15 km^{2} (46.00 sq mi)

Population (2025)
  - Total: 21,560
  - Density: 180/km^{2} (470/sq mi)
- Postal code: 31906
- Website: baoyen.laocai.gov.vn

Bảo Yên is a commune in Lào Cai province, Vietnam.

== History ==
The area has a long history. During the reign of the Later Lê dynasty, around 1516–1522, the area was associated with Đô thống sứ of Tuyên Quang and served as a base for the brothers Vũ Văn Uyên and Vũ Văn Mật.

On 11 January 1986, under Decision No. 03/HĐBT, Phố Ràng township was established from 1,092 hectares of natural area separated from Phố Ràng commune, later renamed Yên Sơn commune, and 783 hectares of natural area separated from Xuân Thượng commune.

On 16 June 2025, the Standing Committee of the National Assembly of Vietnam issued Resolution No. 1673/NQ-UBTVQH15 on the reorganization of commune-level administrative units in Lào Cai province in 2025. Under the resolution, the entire area and population of Phố Ràng township and the former communes of Yên Sơn, Lương Sơn, and Xuân Thượng in Bảo Yên district were consolidated to form a new commune named Bảo Yên.
