= Xiaohe District =

Former district of Guizhou, China

Coordinates: 26°29′29″N 106°42′09″E

Xiaohe District (小河区; pinyin: Xiǎohé Qū) is a former district of Guizhou, China. It is now merged into Huaxi District.
