= Xima Subdistrict, Jieyang =

Xima Subdistrict 西马街道
- Subdistrict
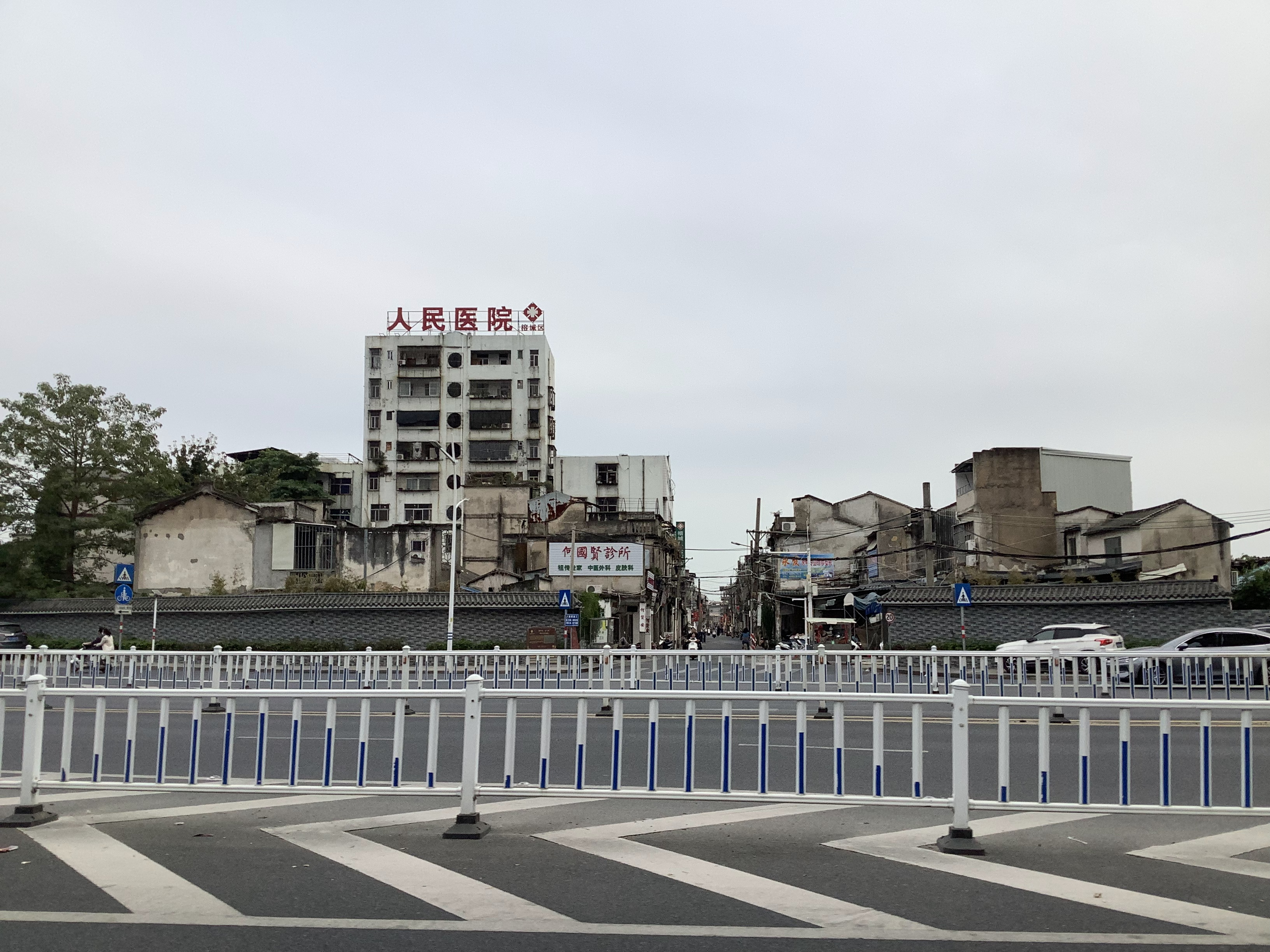

- Location in Guangdong
- Coordinates: 23°32′33″N 116°19′38″E
- Country: People's Republic of China
- Province: Guangdong
- Prefecture-level city: Jieyang
- District: Rongcheng District
- Time zone: UTC+8 (China Standard)

Xima Subdistrict (simplified Chinese: 西马街道; traditional Chinese: 西馬街道; pinyin: Xīmǎ Jiēdào) is a subdistrict in Rongcheng District, Jieyang, Guangdong, China. As of 2018, it has 7 residential communities under its administration.

== See also ==
- List of township-level divisions of Guangdong
