= Xima, Longli County =

Xima 洗马镇
- Town
- Location within Guizhou Location within China
- Coordinates: 26°42′35″N 107°4′38″E
- Country: People's Republic of China
- Province: Guizhou
- Autonomous prefecture: Qiannan Buyei and Miao Autonomous Prefecture
- County: Longli County
- Time zone: UTC+8 (China Standard)

Xima (simplified Chinese: 洗马; traditional Chinese: 洗馬; pinyin: Xǐmǎ) is a town under the administration of Longli County, Guizhou, China. As of 2018, it has 3 residential communities and 11 villages under its administration.

== See also ==
- List of township-level divisions of Guizhou
