= Mường Tè =

- Commune
- Interactive map of Mường Tè
- Coordinates: 22°32′13″N 102°36′34″E
- Country: Vietnam
- Province: Lai Châu
- Region: Northwest
- Established: 16 June 2025
- Seat: Bản Bó

Area
  - Total: 291.99 km^{2} (112.74 sq mi)

Population (2025)
  - Total: 6,364
  - Density: 21/km^{2} (54/sq mi)

Mường Tè is a commune in Lai Châu province, Vietnam.

== History ==
The area of present-day Mường Tè commune was formerly part of Mường Tè district, Lai Châu province.

On 16 June 2025:

- The National Assembly of Vietnam adopted Resolution No. 203/2025/QH15 amending and supplementing several articles of the Constitution of the Socialist Republic of Vietnam. Under the resolution, district-level administrative units nationwide ceased to operate from 1 July 2025.
- The Standing Committee of the National Assembly of Vietnam issued Resolution No. 1670/NQ-UBTVQH15 on the reorganization of commune-level administrative units in Lai Châu province in 2025. Under the resolution, the entire area and population of the former communes of Nậm Khao and Mường Tè were consolidated to form a new commune named Mường Tè.

According to the proposal for the reorganization of commune-level administrative units in Lai Châu province in 2025, Mường Tè commune was established from:

- The entire 184.14 km^{2} area and population of 4,546 of the former Mường Tè commune;
- The entire 107.86 km^{2} area and population of 1,818 of the former Nậm Khao commune.

Mường Tè commune has a total area of approximately 292 km^{2} and a population of 6,364.
