= Xingyi, Guizhou =

Xingyi 兴义市
- County-level city
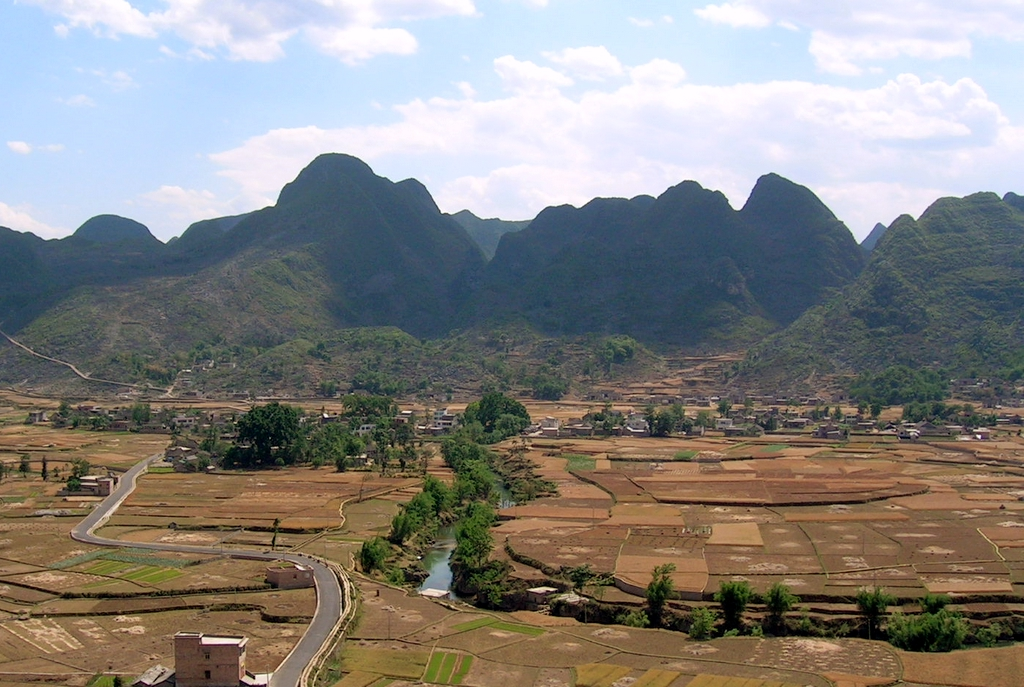
- Xianahui Village in Wanfenglin, Xingyi

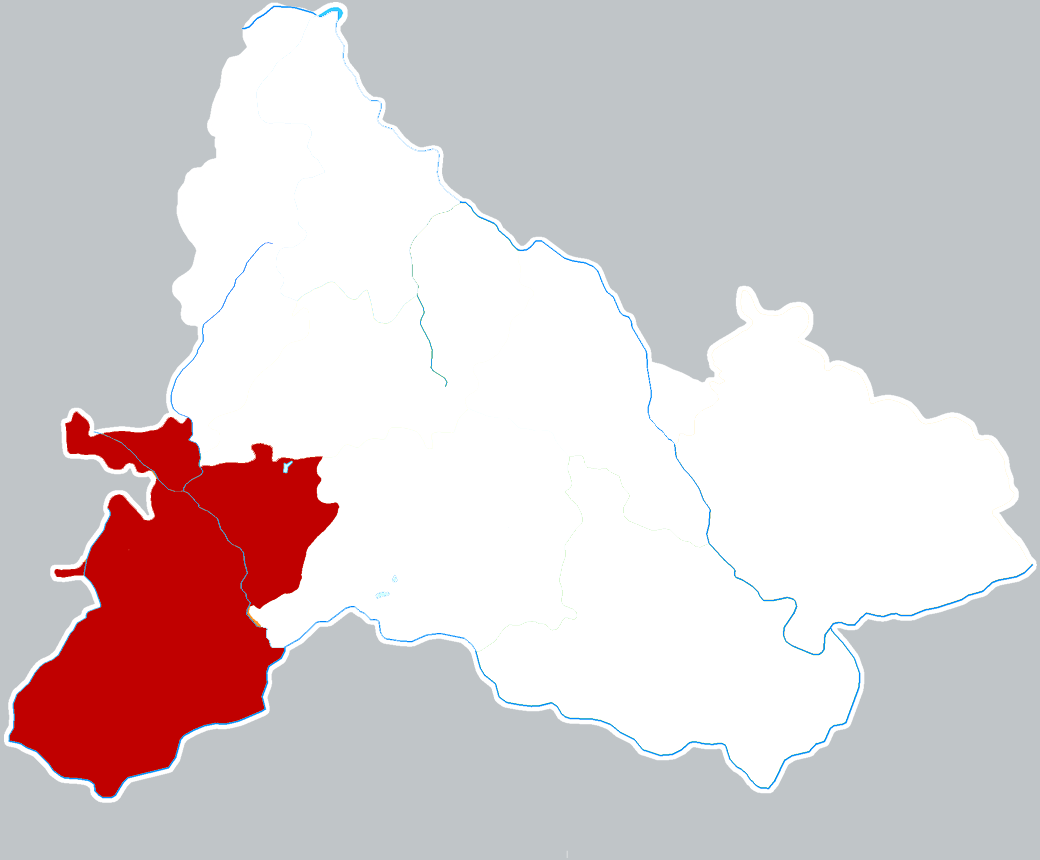
- Xingyi is the division at the southwest corner in this map of Qianxinan

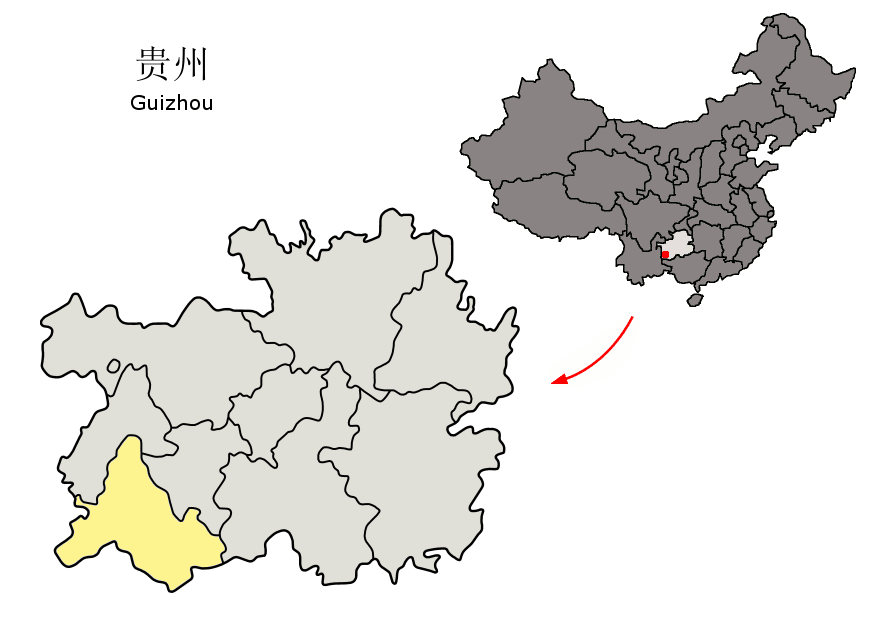
- Qianxinan in Guizhou

- Location within Guizhou Location within Southwest China
- Coordinates (Xingyi municipal government): 25°05′31″N 104°53′44″E
- Country: China
- Province: Guizhou
- Autonomous prefecture: Qianxinan
- Municipal seat: Huangcao Subdistrict

Government
  - Party Secretary: Gu Xianlin
  - Mayor: Zhong Daigang

Area
  - Total: 2,911 km^{2} (1,124 sq mi)

Population (2020 census)
  - Total: 1,004,132
  - Density: 344.9/km^{2} (893.4/sq mi)
- Time zone: UTC+8 (China Standard Time)
- Postal code: 562400
- Area code: (0)859
- License plate prefixes: 贵E
- Website: www.gzxy.gov.cn

Xingyi (simplified Chinese: 兴义; traditional Chinese: 興義; pinyin: Xīngyì) (Bouyei language: Xinyyiq siq) is a county-level city and seat of the Qianxinan Buyei and Miao Autonomous Prefecture, in the southwest of Guizhou Province, China. In March 2024, UNESCO designated the area a Global Geopark; the designation covers the cone karst peak forest at Wanfenglin, the Maling River gorge, and the Middle Triassic marine reptile fossils known as the Xingyi Fauna.

== History ==
The city takes its name from Xingyi Prefecture, which the Qing dynasty created in 1797. In February of that year, Zhongjia (Bouyei) rebels besieged the seat of the neighbouring Nanlong Prefecture in what became known as the Nanlong Uprising; after the revolt was put down, the Qing renamed Nanlong Prefecture as Xingyi. Xingyi County, on the site of the present-day city, was established the following year, in 1798.

== Administrative divisions ==
Xingyi has 12 subdistricts, 17 towns and 3 townships under its jurisdiction:

Subdistricts

- Huangcao Subdistrict (黄草街道)
- Xingtai Subdistrict (兴泰街道)
- Jushan Subdistrict (桔山街道)
- Fengdu Subdistrict (丰都街道)
- Pingdong Subdistrict (坪东街道)
- Mujia Subdistrict (木贾街道)
- Xiawutun Subdistrict (下五屯街道)
- Wanfenglin Subdistrict (万峰林街道)
- Sajin Subdistrict (洒金街道)
- Maling Subdistrict (马岭街道)
- Dingxiao Subdistrict (顶效街道)
- Mulong Subdistrict (木陇街道)

Towns

- Jingnan Town (敬南镇)
- Nidang Town (泥凼镇)
- Nanpanjiang Town (南盘江镇)
- Pengzha Town (捧鲊镇)
- Lubuge Town (鲁布格镇)
- Sanjiangkou Town (三江口镇)
- Wusha Town (乌沙镇)
- Baiwanyao Town (白碗窑镇)
- Weishe Town (威舍镇)
- Qingshuihe Town (清水河镇)
- Zhengtun Town (郑屯镇)
- Wantun Town (万屯镇)
- Lutun Town (鲁屯镇)
- Canggeng Town (仓更镇)
- Qishe Town (七舍镇)
- Zerong Town (则戎镇)
- Zhuchangping Town (猪场坪镇)

Townships

- Cangjiang Township (沧江乡)
- Luowan Township (洛万乡)
- Xiongwu Township (雄武乡)

== Geography ==
Xingyi borders Anlong County to the east, Xilin County and Longlin County, Guangxi to the south, Luoping County and Fuyuan County, Yunnan to the west, and Xingren, Pu'an County and Panzhou to the north, respectively.

The city has an area of 2911 square kilometers, and a population of 784,032 as of 2010. It is under the administration of the Qianxinan Buyei and Miao Autonomous Prefecture.

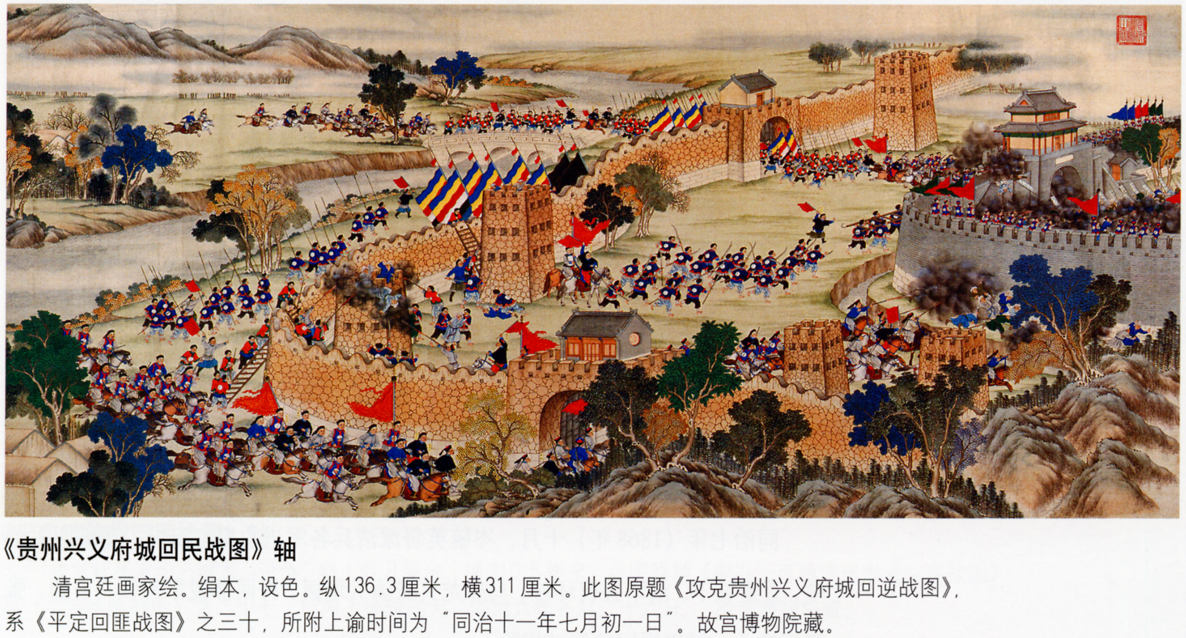
Capture of Xingyi by the Qing Dynasty during the Panthay Rebellion.

== Geology and palaeontology ==
Xingyi lies in the karst country of the Yunnan–Guizhou Plateau. The Wanfenglin peak forest south of the city is an expanse of cone karst developed in Triassic limestone, and the Maling River has cut a gorge through the plateau to the north-east.

The city gives its name to the Xingyi Fauna, an assemblage of Middle Triassic marine reptiles and fishes preserved in the Zhuganpo Member of the Falang Formation and dated to the late Ladinian, roughly 242 to 237 million years ago. The pachypleurosaur Keichousaurus hui was described from these beds by Yang Zhongjian in 1958 and named after Hu Chengzhi, who had collected the first specimens the previous year. The fossil localities at Wusha and Dingxiao are two of the four components of the Guizhou Triassic Fossil Sites entry on China's UNESCO World Heritage Tentative List.

== Transportation ==
Xingyi is served by the Nanning–Kunming Railway and by the Xingyi Wanfenglin Airport.

== Biodiversity hotspot ==
Based on Red Data Book listed endangered species of fish, amphibians, reptiles, and mammals, Xingyi is one of nine vertebrate biodiversity hotspots of China.

== Climate ==
Climate data for Xingyi, elevation 1,300 m (4,300 ft), (1991–2020 normals, extremes 1981–2010)
Month	Jan	Feb	Mar	Apr	May	Jun	Jul	Aug	Sep	Oct	Nov	Dec	Year
Record high °C (°F)	27.6 (81.7)	31.0 (87.8)	33.8 (92.8)	34.5 (94.1)	36.5 (97.7)	33.7 (92.7)	33.5 (92.3)	32.1 (89.8)	33.6 (92.5)	30.4 (86.7)	28.2 (82.8)	26.5 (79.7)	36.5 (97.7)
Mean daily maximum °C (°F)	11.8 (53.2)	15.3 (59.5)	19.9 (67.8)	24.5 (76.1)	26.2 (79.2)	26.7 (80.1)	27.2 (81.0)	27.3 (81.1)	25.3 (77.5)	21.1 (70.0)	18.2 (64.8)	13.0 (55.4)	21.4 (70.5)
Daily mean °C (°F)	7.7 (45.9)	10.4 (50.7)	14.2 (57.6)	18.7 (65.7)	21.0 (69.8)	22.1 (71.8)	22.7 (72.9)	22.5 (72.5)	20.7 (69.3)	17.0 (62.6)	13.6 (56.5)	9.0 (48.2)	16.6 (62.0)
Mean daily minimum °C (°F)	5.2 (41.4)	7.2 (45.0)	10.6 (51.1)	14.6 (58.3)	17.3 (63.1)	19.1 (66.4)	19.8 (67.6)	19.4 (66.9)	17.6 (63.7)	14.4 (57.9)	10.6 (51.1)	6.5 (43.7)	13.5 (56.4)
Record low °C (°F)	−3.3 (26.1)	−2.1 (28.2)	−1.6 (29.1)	3.6 (38.5)	8.5 (47.3)	12.8 (55.0)	14.1 (57.4)	14.3 (57.7)	10.0 (50.0)	6.4 (43.5)	0.8 (33.4)	−4.7 (23.5)	−4.7 (23.5)
Average precipitation mm (inches)	32.6 (1.28)	26.9 (1.06)	35.4 (1.39)	49.9 (1.96)	136.8 (5.39)	296.0 (11.65)	303.6 (11.95)	214.1 (8.43)	162.6 (6.40)	104.6 (4.12)	38.1 (1.50)	26.7 (1.05)	1,427.3 (56.18)
Average precipitation days (≥ 0.1 mm)	14.8	12.4	12.1	11.7	14.7	18.9	20.2	18.4	14.2	16.0	10.3	12.0	175.7
Average snowy days	1.7	0.8	0.1	0	0	0	0	0	0	0	0	0.4	3
Average relative humidity (%)	84	77	73	69	74	82	84	82	81	84	81	82	79
Mean monthly sunshine hours	78.1	104.8	134.1	164.3	171.1	133.7	155.9	167.1	138.7	102.9	120.2	85.0	1,555.9
Percentage possible sunshine	23	33	36	43	41	33	37	42	38	29	37	26	35
Source: China Meteorological Administration
