= Bát Xát =

Bát Xát Xã Bát Xát
- Commune
- Location within Vietnam
- Coordinates: 22°32′28″N 103°53′23″E
- Country: Vietnam
- Region: Northwest
- Province: Lào Cai
- Time zone: UTC+7 (UTC + 7)

Bát Xát is a commune (xã) of Lào Cai Province, Vietnam.

On June 16, 2025, the Standing Committee of the National Assembly issued Resolution No. 1680/NQ-UBTVQH15 on the reorganization of commune-level administrative units in Lào Cai Province in 2025. Accordingly, Bát Xát Township, together with Bản Vược Commune, Bản Qua Commune, Phìn Ngan Commune, and Quang Kim Commune, were merged to form a new commune named Bát Xát Commune.
