= Xima Township, Hunan =

Xima Township 洗马乡
- Township
- Location in Hunan
- Coordinates: 27°18′55″N 110°27′40″E
- Country: People's Republic of China
- Province: Hunan
- Prefecture-level city: Huaihua
- County-level city: Hongjiang
- Time zone: UTC+8 (China Standard)

Xima Township (simplified Chinese: 洗马乡; traditional Chinese: 洗馬鄉; pinyin: Xǐmǎ Xiāng) is a township under the administration of Hongjiang, Hunan, China. As of 2018, it has 11 villages under its administration.
