= Zhenfeng County =

Zhenfeng County 贞丰县
- County
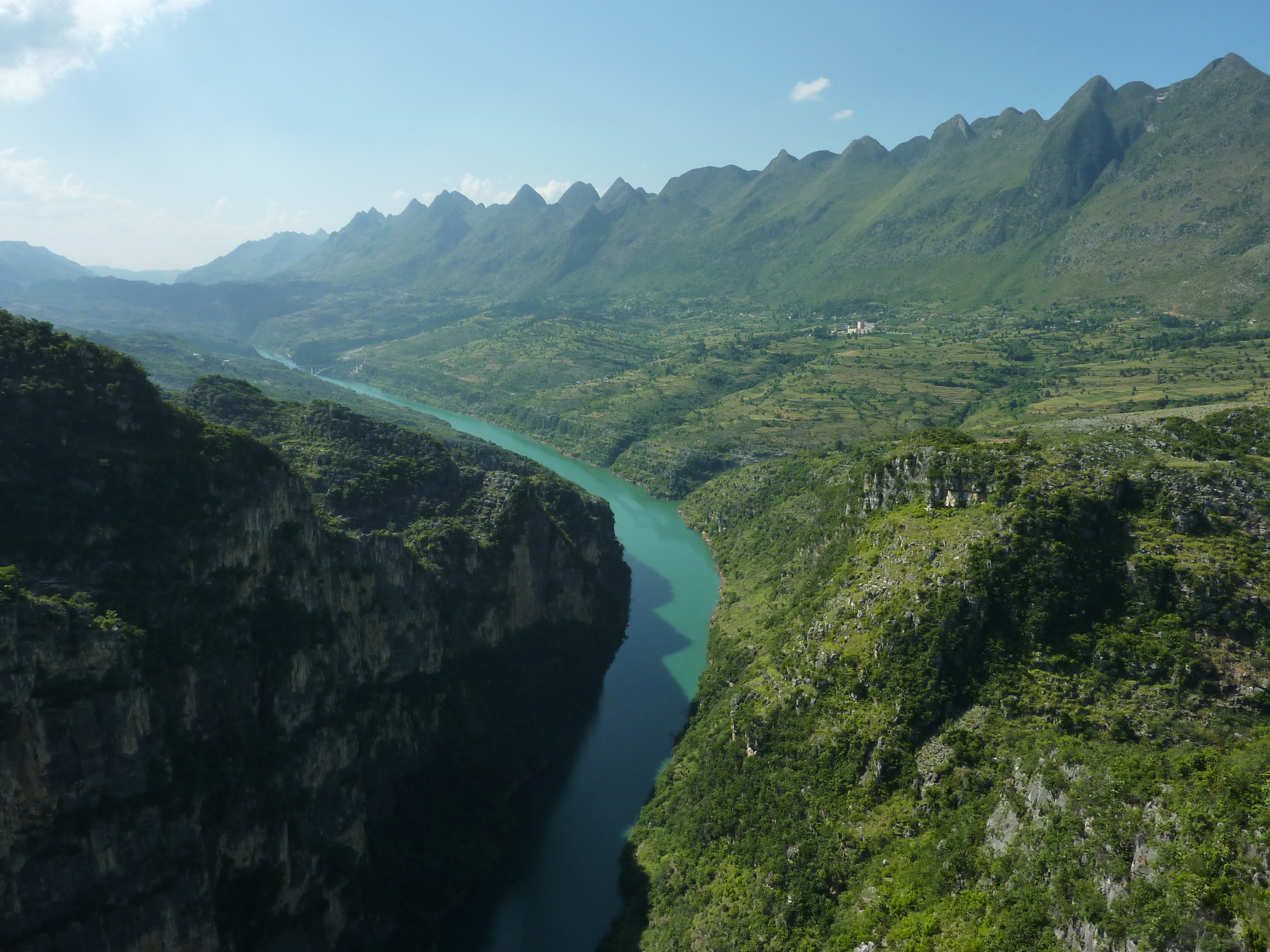

- Location of the seat in Guizhou Zhenfeng (Southwest China)
- Coordinates (Zhenfeng County government): 25°23′09″N 105°39′00″E
- Country: China
- Province: Guizhou
- Autonomous prefecture: Qianxinan
- County seat: Mingu

Area
  - Total: 1,512 km^{2} (584 sq mi)

Population (2010)
  - Total: 303,762
  - Density: 200.9/km^{2} (520.3/sq mi)
- Time zone: UTC+8 (China Standard)

Zhenfeng County (simplified Chinese: 贞丰县; traditional Chinese: 貞豐縣; pinyin: Zhēnfēng Xiàn) (Bouyei language: Miangxguz xianq) is a county in the southwest of Guizhou province, China. It is under the administration of the Qianxinan Buyei and Miao Autonomous Prefecture.

== Administrative divisions ==
Zhenfeng County is divided into 5 subdistricts, 9 towns and 3 townships:

subdistricts

- Yongfeng 永丰街道
- Mingu 珉谷街道
- Fengmao 丰茂街道
- Longxing 龙兴街道
- Shuangfeng 双峰街道

towns

- Longchang 龙场镇
- Zhexiang 者相镇
- Beipanjiang 北盘江镇
- Baiceng 白层镇
- Lugong 鲁贡镇
- Xiaotun 小屯镇
- Changtian 长田镇
- Shaping 沙坪镇
- Wanlan 挽澜镇

townships

- Lianhuan 连环乡
- Pingjie 平街乡
- Lurong 鲁容乡

== Climate ==
Climate data for Zhenfeng, elevation 1,063 m (3,488 ft), (1991–2020 normals, extremes 1981–2010)
Month	Jan	Feb	Mar	Apr	May	Jun	Jul	Aug	Sep	Oct	Nov	Dec	Year
Record high °C (°F)	27.5 (81.5)	30.8 (87.4)	35.0 (95.0)	35.6 (96.1)	35.7 (96.3)	35.3 (95.5)	33.5 (92.3)	32.2 (90.0)	33.0 (91.4)	30.3 (86.5)	29.8 (85.6)	25.1 (77.2)	35.7 (96.3)
Mean daily maximum °C (°F)	10.3 (50.5)	14.1 (57.4)	18.2 (64.8)	23.3 (73.9)	25.6 (78.1)	26.3 (79.3)	27.3 (81.1)	27.5 (81.5)	25.6 (78.1)	21.0 (69.8)	17.5 (63.5)	12.4 (54.3)	20.8 (69.4)
Daily mean °C (°F)	7.1 (44.8)	9.9 (49.8)	13.5 (56.3)	18.4 (65.1)	21.2 (70.2)	22.8 (73.0)	23.6 (74.5)	23.3 (73.9)	21.2 (70.2)	17.5 (63.5)	13.6 (56.5)	9.0 (48.2)	16.8 (62.2)
Mean daily minimum °C (°F)	4.9 (40.8)	7.1 (44.8)	10.3 (50.5)	14.7 (58.5)	17.7 (63.9)	20.0 (68.0)	20.8 (69.4)	20.2 (68.4)	18.1 (64.6)	15.1 (59.2)	10.9 (51.6)	6.7 (44.1)	13.9 (57.0)
Record low °C (°F)	−2.8 (27.0)	−1.8 (28.8)	−1.6 (29.1)	4.4 (39.9)	9.8 (49.6)	13.6 (56.5)	14.3 (57.7)	15.2 (59.4)	10.0 (50.0)	6.7 (44.1)	1.1 (34.0)	−4.2 (24.4)	−4.2 (24.4)
Average precipitation mm (inches)	26.9 (1.06)	24.5 (0.96)	42.0 (1.65)	66.8 (2.63)	157.2 (6.19)	266.0 (10.47)	257.7 (10.15)	187.6 (7.39)	103.5 (4.07)	86.4 (3.40)	37.0 (1.46)	22.4 (0.88)	1,278 (50.31)
Average precipitation days (≥ 0.1 mm)	14.5	11.6	12.7	13.5	14.9	17.4	17.2	14.9	11.4	13.5	9.8	10.4	161.8
Average snowy days	1.9	0.8	0.1	0	0	0	0	0	0	0	0.1	0.4	3.3
Average relative humidity (%)	81	78	75	73	74	82	84	83	80	81	79	79	79
Mean monthly sunshine hours	53.2	79.4	99.9	128.4	132.8	95.8	130.9	153.8	129.7	84.2	99.2	71.4	1,258.7
Percentage possible sunshine	16	25	27	33	32	23	31	38	35	24	31	22	28
Source: China Meteorological Administration
