= Giáy people =

Ethnic group in Southeast Asia

Giáy
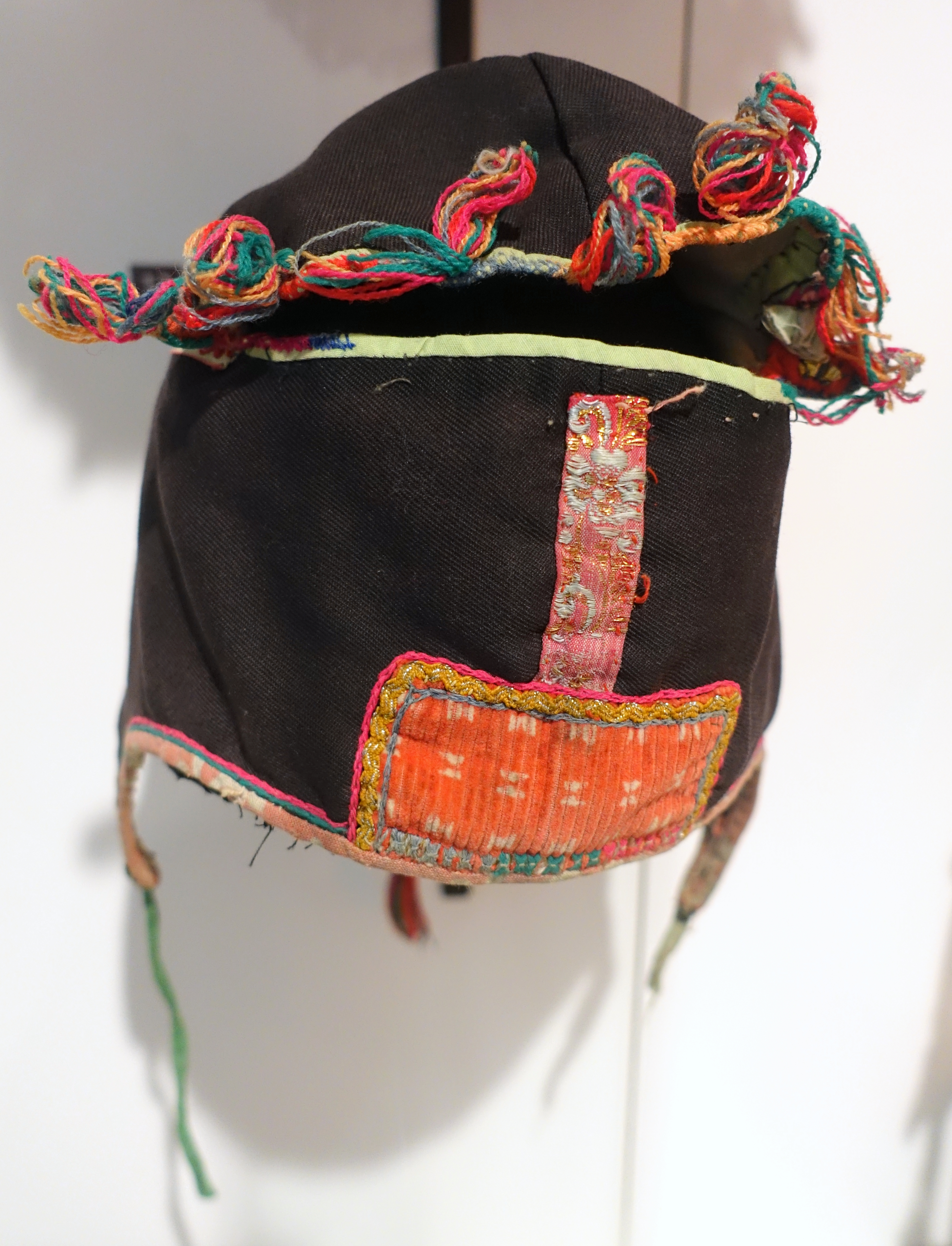

Total population
- 67,858 (2019)

Regions with significant populations
- Vietnam : Cao Bằng, Lào Cai, Hà Giang

Languages
- Giáy • Vietnamese

Religion
- Animism

The Giáy people (Vietnamese: người Giáy [ŋɯɤi˨˩ zɑi˧˥]), known in Laos as the Nhang or Yang, are an ethnic group in Vietnam and Laos. Most live in the mountainous northern provinces of Lào Cai, Hà Giang, Lai Châu, and Cao Bằng. In 2019 the population was 67,858.

== Language ==
The Giáy speak the Bouyei language, a member of the Tai language family. Literacy is low in their native language, however, most Giáy can also speak and write Vietnamese, which they learn in primary school.

== Culture ==
The Giáy traditionally cultivate rice in paddy fields using simple technology. Water buffalo are raised as draft animals and are used to plow the land. Chickens and pigs are raised for food. Corn and cassava are also grown (sometimes on land too steep to use for rice cultivation) as feed for livestock.

Giáy make their clothing from cotton. Women usually wear a brightly colored five-panel blouse which buttons under the right arm and features a contrasting collar and cuffs. Women also wear colorful plaid headscarves. Men traditionally wear simple tunics and turbans. Both men and women wear loose indigo trousers. Western dress is now common among many Giáy, especially men.

Giáy society is patriarchal. Children carry the last name of their father. The eldest son in a family (or son-in-law if they have no sons) is responsible for caring for his parents; he continues to live in the family home even after he is married.

Traditionally, the Giáy treated farmland as communal property. Although today it is becoming more common for each family to own a separate plot of farmland, planting and harvesting are still done as a community. On the snake day of the first lunar month, the Giáy celebrate Roóng Poọc, a festival to mark the start of the rice season.

They serve dishes called lạp siềng and lò nùng. They sing vương and phướn.

== Religion ==
The Giáy traditionally worship their ancestors, as well as animistic spirits that govern the heavens, the soil, the kitchen, and others.

Each Giáy village has a grove called a đoong xía that is sacred. Offerings are made twice per year at the biggest tree in the grove, to ensure the favor of the spirit that governs over the village.
