= Longli County =

Longli County 龙里县
- County
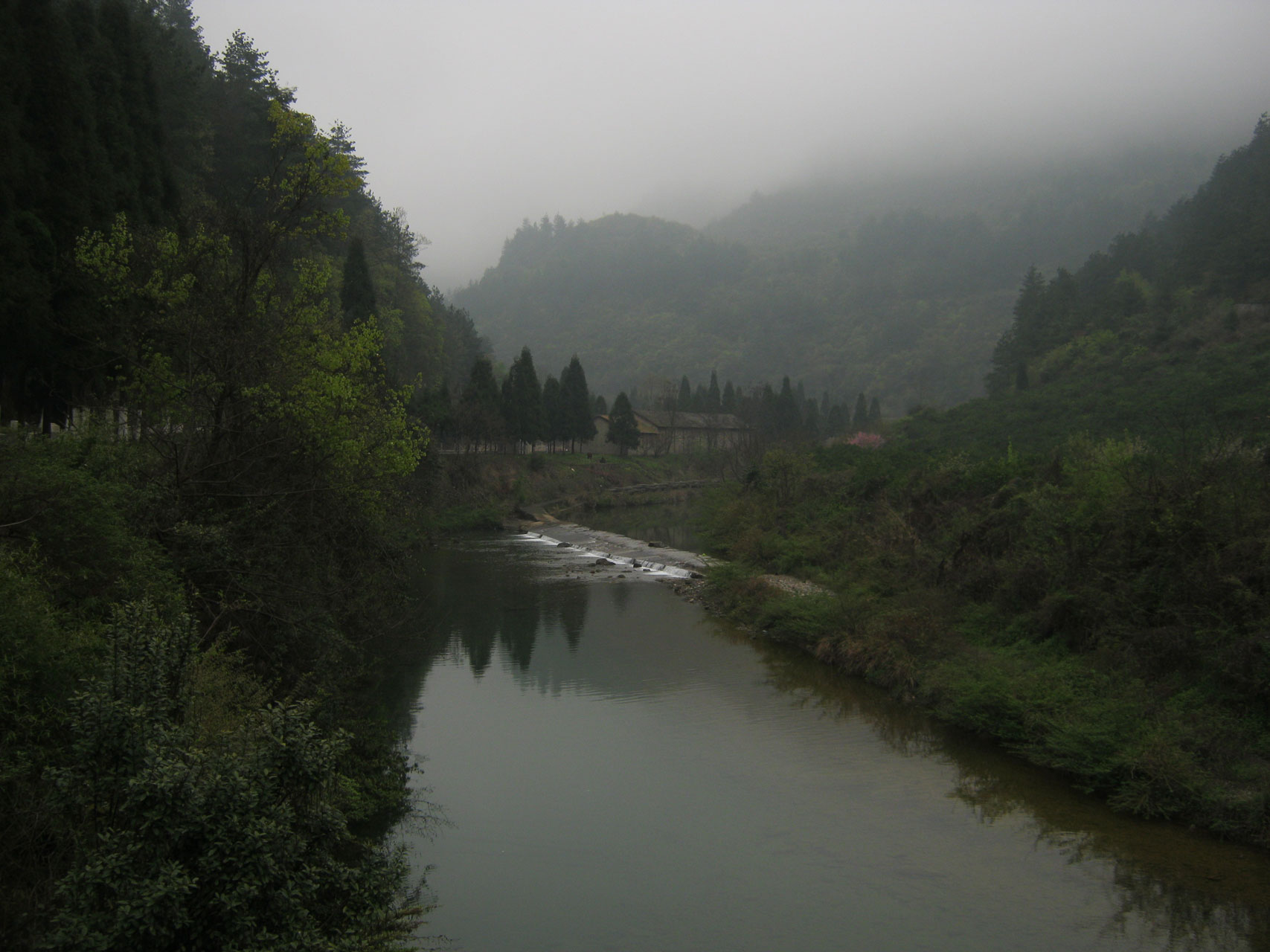

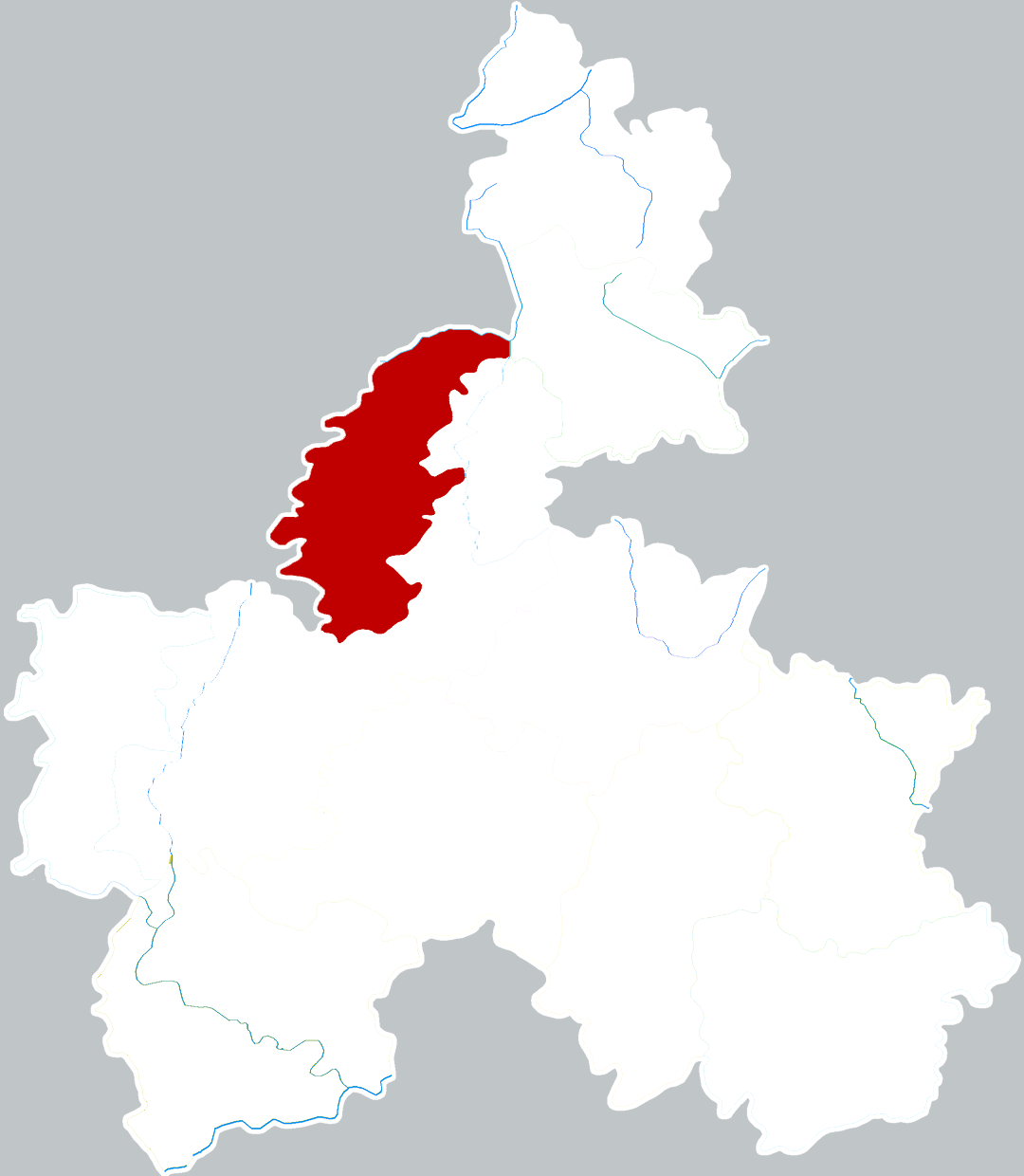

- Location of the seat in Guizhou Longli (Southwest China)
- Coordinates: 26°27′13″N 106°58′45″E
- Country: China
- Province: Guizhou
- Autonomous prefecture: Qiannan
- County seat: Guanshan

Area
  - Total: 1,521 km^{2} (587 sq mi)

Population (2010)
  - Total: 180,683
  - Density: 118.8/km^{2} (307.7/sq mi)
- Time zone: UTC+8 (China Standard)
- Postal code: 551200

Longli County (simplified Chinese: 龙里县; traditional Chinese: 龍里縣) is a county of the Qiannan Buyei and Miao Autonomous Prefecture, in central Guizhou Province, China.

== Administrative divisions ==
Longli County is divided into 1 subdistrict, 5 towns, 2 townships and 1 ethnic township:

subdistricts

- Guanshan 冠山街道

towns

- Longshan 龙山镇
- Xingshi 醒狮镇
- Gujiao 谷脚镇
- Wantanhe 湾滩河镇
- Xima 洗马镇

== Transportation ==
- Qiangui Railway
- Zhuliu Railway
- Xiangqian Railway
- China National Highway 210
- China National Highway 320

== Climate ==
Climate data for Longli, elevation 1,093 m (3,586 ft), (1991–2020 normals, extremes 1981–2010)
Month	Jan	Feb	Mar	Apr	May	Jun	Jul	Aug	Sep	Oct	Nov	Dec	Year
Record high °C (°F)	23.5 (74.3)	29.4 (84.9)	31.5 (88.7)	33.0 (91.4)	34.4 (93.9)	33.0 (91.4)	33.8 (92.8)	33.9 (93.0)	33.9 (93.0)	30.8 (87.4)	27.3 (81.1)	25.0 (77.0)	34.4 (93.9)
Mean daily maximum °C (°F)	8.7 (47.7)	12.1 (53.8)	16.4 (61.5)	21.5 (70.7)	24.4 (75.9)	26.3 (79.3)	28.3 (82.9)	28.3 (82.9)	25.4 (77.7)	20.4 (68.7)	16.7 (62.1)	11.2 (52.2)	20.0 (68.0)
Daily mean °C (°F)	4.9 (40.8)	7.6 (45.7)	11.4 (52.5)	16.3 (61.3)	19.6 (67.3)	22.1 (71.8)	23.7 (74.7)	23.1 (73.6)	20.3 (68.5)	16.1 (61.0)	11.8 (53.2)	6.8 (44.2)	15.3 (59.6)
Mean daily minimum °C (°F)	2.4 (36.3)	4.6 (40.3)	8.0 (46.4)	12.7 (54.9)	16.1 (61.0)	19.1 (66.4)	20.6 (69.1)	19.7 (67.5)	16.8 (62.2)	13.2 (55.8)	8.6 (47.5)	3.9 (39.0)	12.1 (53.9)
Record low °C (°F)	−6.3 (20.7)	−6.0 (21.2)	−4.1 (24.6)	1.9 (35.4)	4.3 (39.7)	10.6 (51.1)	10.4 (50.7)	12.5 (54.5)	7.2 (45.0)	1.3 (34.3)	−2.7 (27.1)	−6.8 (19.8)	−6.8 (19.8)
Average precipitation mm (inches)	24.3 (0.96)	22.2 (0.87)	48.4 (1.91)	81.0 (3.19)	174.9 (6.89)	235.0 (9.25)	197.2 (7.76)	108.5 (4.27)	97.6 (3.84)	85.5 (3.37)	39.3 (1.55)	20.6 (0.81)	1,134.5 (44.67)
Average precipitation days (≥ 0.1 mm)	14.1	11.7	13.9	14.9	16.5	17.5	15.7	14.2	11.4	14.2	10.0	10.9	165
Average snowy days	4.4	2.2	0.6	0	0	0	0	0	0	0	0.1	1.4	8.7
Average relative humidity (%)	81	78	78	77	77	81	79	79	79	81	79	78	79
Mean monthly sunshine hours	42.7	62.9	84.5	112.0	121.6	97.2	152.0	162.0	124.6	85.7	85.0	60.5	1,190.7
Percentage possible sunshine	13	20	23	29	29	24	36	40	34	24	26	19	26
Source: China Meteorological Administration
