= Xingren =

Xingren 兴仁市
- County-level city
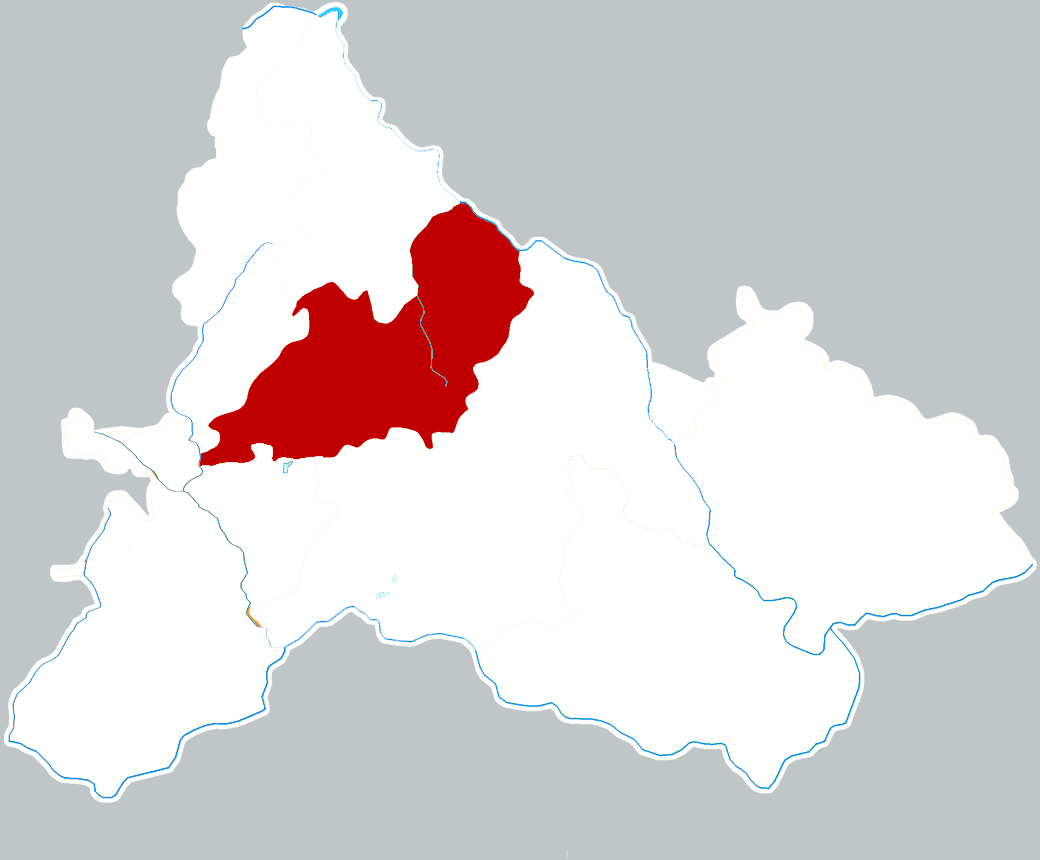

- Location of the city center in Guizhou Xingren (Southwest China)
- Coordinates (Xingren municipal government): 25°26′06″N 105°11′10″E
- Country: China
- Province: Guizhou
- Autonomous prefecture: Qianxinan
- Municipal seat: Chengbei Subdistrict

Area
  - Total: 1,785 km^{2} (689 sq mi)
- Elevation: 1,354 m (4,442 ft)

Population (2020 census)
  - Total: 425,770
  - Density: 238.5/km^{2} (617.8/sq mi)
- Time zone: UTC+8 (China Standard)
- Postal code: 562300
- Website: www.gzxr.gov.cn

Xingren (simplified Chinese: 兴仁市; traditional Chinese: 興仁市; pinyin: Xīngrén Shì) is a county-level city of southwestern Guizhou province, China. It is under the administration of the Qianxinan Buyei and Miao Autonomous Prefecture.

== Administrative divisions ==
Xingren has 6 subdistricts, 11 towns and 1 ethnic township:

subdistricts

- Donghu Subdistrict (东湖街道)
- Chengnan Subdistrict (城南街道)
- Zhenwushan Subdistrict (真武山街道)
- Chengbei Subdistrict (城北街道)
- Luguan Subdistrict (陆官街道)
- Yipintianyuan Subdistrict (薏品田园街道)

towns

- Tunjiao Town (屯脚镇)
- Baling Town (巴铃镇)
- Baide Town (百德镇)
- Yuzhang Town (雨樟镇)
- Panjiazhuang Town (潘家庄镇)
- Huilong Town (回龙镇)
- Xiashan Town (下山镇)
- Xinlongchang Town (新龙场镇)
- Dashan Town (大山镇)
- Mamaya Town (马马崖镇)
- Boyang Town (波阳镇

ethnic townships

- Luchuying Hui Ethnic Township (鲁础营回族乡)

== Geography and climate ==
Due to its low latitude and elevation above 1,300 m (4,265.09 ft), Xingren has a monsoon-influenced humid subtropical climate (Köppen Cwa), bordering on a subtropical highland climate (Köppen Cwb) with very warm, rainy summers and mild, damp winters. The monthly 24-hour average temperature ranges from 6.6 °C (43.9 °F) in January to 22.3 °C (72.1 °F) in July, while the annual mean is 15.7 °C (60.3 °F). Rainfall is very common year-round, occurring on 175 days of the year, but over 75% of the annual total (1,294 mm or 51 in) occurs from May to September. With monthly percent possible sunshine ranging from 24% in January to 40% in April, the county receives 1,441 hours of bright sunshine annually, with spring and summer sunnier than autumn and winter.

Climate data for Xingren, elevation 1,379 m (4,524 ft), (1991–2020 normals, extremes 1951–present)
Month	Jan	Feb	Mar	Apr	May	Jun	Jul	Aug	Sep	Oct	Nov	Dec	Year
Record high °C (°F)	27.6 (81.7)	29.6 (85.3)	32.7 (90.9)	34.6 (94.3)	36.5 (97.7)	33.4 (92.1)	34.0 (93.2)	33.6 (92.5)	32.0 (89.6)	30.2 (86.4)	30.5 (86.9)	26.6 (79.9)	36.5 (97.7)
Mean daily maximum °C (°F)	11.0 (51.8)	14.4 (57.9)	18.7 (65.7)	23.2 (73.8)	25.2 (77.4)	26.0 (78.8)	26.8 (80.2)	26.9 (80.4)	24.7 (76.5)	20.4 (68.7)	17.5 (63.5)	12.4 (54.3)	20.6 (69.1)
Daily mean °C (°F)	6.6 (43.9)	9.3 (48.7)	13.0 (55.4)	17.5 (63.5)	20.1 (68.2)	21.6 (70.9)	22.3 (72.1)	21.9 (71.4)	19.8 (67.6)	16.2 (61.2)	12.6 (54.7)	8.1 (46.6)	15.7 (60.4)
Mean daily minimum °C (°F)	3.9 (39.0)	5.9 (42.6)	9.3 (48.7)	13.5 (56.3)	16.4 (61.5)	18.6 (65.5)	19.4 (66.9)	18.7 (65.7)	16.7 (62.1)	13.7 (56.7)	9.6 (49.3)	5.3 (41.5)	12.6 (54.7)
Record low °C (°F)	−5.5 (22.1)	−7.8 (18.0)	−2.5 (27.5)	1.6 (34.9)	7.4 (45.3)	10.0 (50.0)	12.0 (53.6)	12.3 (54.1)	7.2 (45.0)	3.0 (37.4)	−1.3 (29.7)	−4.9 (23.2)	−7.8 (18.0)
Average precipitation mm (inches)	29.8 (1.17)	21.0 (0.83)	41.3 (1.63)	55.0 (2.17)	145.4 (5.72)	282.0 (11.10)	249.7 (9.83)	179.3 (7.06)	134.3 (5.29)	96.9 (3.81)	37.2 (1.46)	22.4 (0.88)	1,294.3 (50.95)
Average precipitation days (≥ 0.1 mm)	15.3	12.3	13.2	13.3	15.9	18.6	18.4	16.3	13.2	15.6	10.4	12.7	175.2
Average snowy days	2.8	1.4	0.2	0	0	0	0	0	0	0	0.1	0.8	5.3
Average relative humidity (%)	83	77	74	71	74	81	82	82	81	83	80	82	79
Mean monthly sunshine hours	79.5	101.7	124.8	153.2	151.9	114.2	143.0	155.8	124.2	92.2	117.0	83.4	1,440.9
Percentage possible sunshine	24	32	33	40	37	28	34	39	34	26	36	26	32
Source 1: China Meteorological Administrationextremes
Source 2: Weather China
