= Qianxinan Buyei and Miao Autonomous Prefecture =

Coordinates: 25.09°N 104.91°E

Qianxinan Prefecture 黔西南州 · Qianfxiynanf zouy · Qeef Xib Naif Zeb
- Autonomous prefecture
- 黔西南布依族苗族自治州 Qianxinan Buyei and Miao Autonomous Prefecture
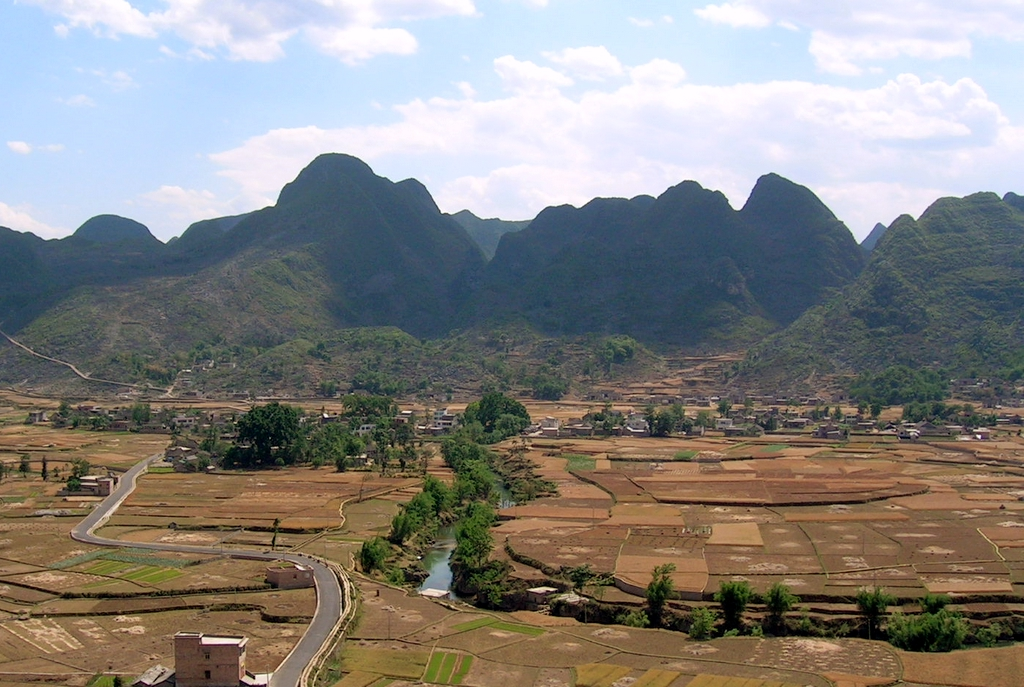
- Wan Feng Lin River near Xingyi

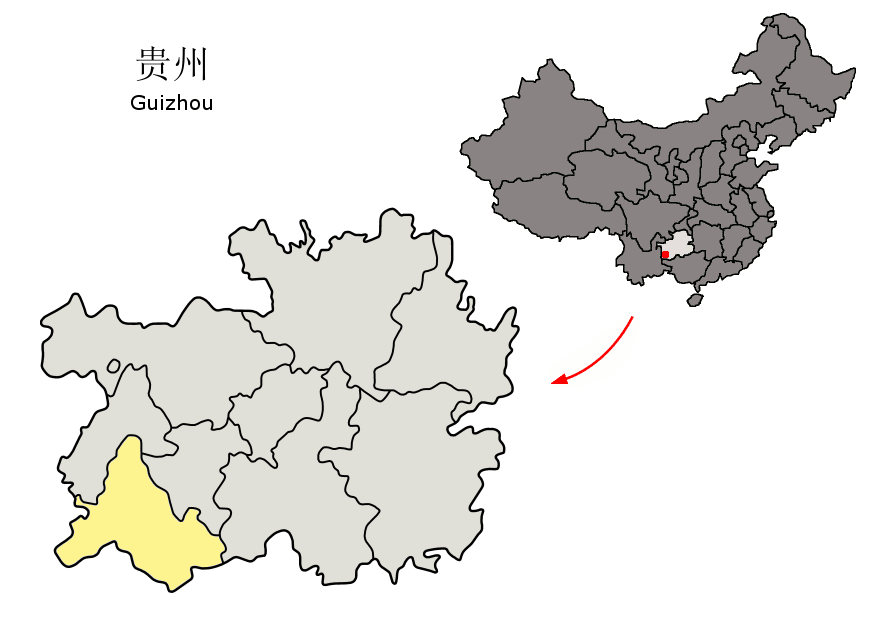
- Location of Qianxinan Buyei and Miao; Autonomous Prefecture within Guizhou
- Country: People's Republic of China
- Province: Guizhou
- Prefectural seat: Xingyi

Area
  - Total: 16,804 km^{2} (6,488 sq mi)

Population (2003)
  - Total: 3,059,400

GDP
  - Total: CN¥ 135.3 billion US$ 19.6 billion
  - Per capita: CN¥ 44,881; US$6,507
- Time zone: UTC+8 (China Standard)
- ISO 3166 code: CN-GZ-23
- Website: www.qxn.gov.cn

Qianxinan Buyei and Miao Autonomous Prefecture (Chinese: 黔西南布依族苗族自治州; pinyin: Qiánxīnán Bùyīzú Miáozú Zìzhìzhōu; Buyei: Qianfxiynanf Buxqyaix Buxyeeuz Ziqziqzouy; Hmu: Qeef Xib Naif Dol Yat Dol Hmub Zid Zid Zeb) is an autonomous prefecture of Guizhou province, People's Republic of China, bordering Guangxi to the south and Yunnan to the west. The name, "黔西南" derives from the prefecture's southwest location in the province; "黔" is the official abbreviation for Guizhou, while "西南" means "southwest".

== History ==
The region of Qianxinan has been inhabited since ancient times and is traditionally associated with the Guifang. During the Spring and Autumn period and Warring States period, it was linked to the Yelang polity, and later incorporated into the imperial system under the Qin dynasty and Han dynasty as part of Zangke Commandery. In the Three Kingdoms period, it was reorganised under Xinggu Commandery following the campaigns of Zhuge Liang. During the Northern and Southern dynasties, it was associated with the Cuoman and Wuman peoples. In the Tang dynasty, it was administered under the jimi system as Xiping and Pan Prefectures, before coming under the control of Nanzhao. During the Song dynasty, it remained outside direct control and was linked to entities associated with the Dali Kingdom.

Following the Mongol conquest of China, the region was incorporated into the Yuan dynasty as Pu’an Route. During the Ming dynasty and Qing dynasty, it underwent multiple administrative changes, including the establishment of Xingyi Prefecture in 1797 with its seat at Anlong. During the Republic of China, the prefecture was abolished and the area placed under Guixi Circuit. After the founding of the People’s Republic of China in 1949, the region was reorganised several times before the establishment of the Qianxinan Buyei and Miao Autonomous Prefecture in 1981. Xingyi was upgraded to a county-level city in 1987, and Xingren in 2018.

== Geography ==
Qianxinan Buyei and Miao Autonomous Prefecture is located in southwestern Guizhou. It spans 210 km east–west and 177 km north–south, covering an area of 16,804 km^{2} (6,488 sq mi). The prefecture lies within the Pearl River Basin, specifically the Nanpan and Beipan River watersheds. It borders Qiannan Buyei and Miao Autonomous Prefecture (Guizhou) to the east, Anshun (Guizhou) to the northeast, Baise (Guangxi) to the south, and Qujing (Yunnan) and Liupanshui (Guizhou) to the west. The terrain is characterized by a westward and northward elevation gradient, with higher elevations in the west and north and lower in the east and south. Most of the prefecture lies between 1,000 and 2,000 meters in elevation. The terrain is rugged and diverse, with significant internal variations, divided into five distinct geomorphic zones: low mountain erosion canyon zone, karst plateau trough zone, karst erosion plateau zone, karst erosion mountain zone, and erosion mountain valley zone. Soils are predominantly acidic to slightly acidic red and yellow soils, typical of the region's karst and mountainous landscape.

== Political structure ==
Title	CCP Committee Secretary	People's Congress Chairwoman	Governor	Qianxinan CPPCC Chairman
Name	Qiu Zhenguo	Luo Chunhong	Shi Qilin (acting)	Zhou Zhou
Ethnicity	Han	Bouyei	Bouyei	Bouyei
Born	April 1971 (age 55)	February 1967 (age 59)	November 1980 (age 45–46)	November 1968 (age 57–58)
Assumed office	November 2025	February 2022	June 2026	February 2024

== Mass media ==
Qianxinan Television is the cable television station based in Qianxinan.

== Subdivisions ==
The prefecture is subdivided into 8 county-level divisions: 2 county-level cities, and 6 counties.

- County level cities:
  - Xingyi (兴义市)
  - Xingren (兴仁市)
- Counties:
  - Wangmo County (望谟县)
  - Pu'an County (普安县)
  - Ceheng County (册亨县)
  - Qinglong County (晴隆县)
  - Zhenfeng County (贞丰县)
  - Anlong County (安龙县)

Map
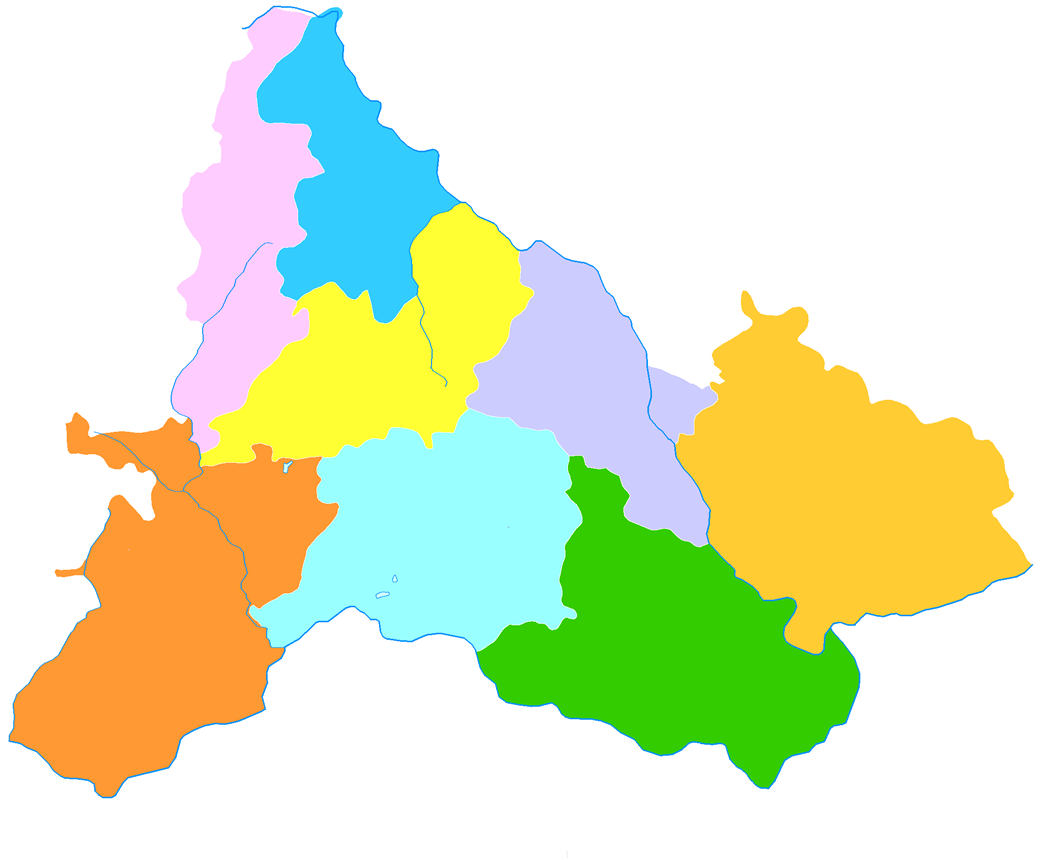
