= Anlong County =

Anlong County 安龙县
- County
- Location of the seat in Guizhou Anlong (Southwest China)
- Coordinates (Anlong County government): 25°05′56″N 105°26′34″E
- Country: China
- Province: Guizhou
- Autonomous prefecture: Qianxinan
- County seat: Qifeng

Area
  - Total: 2,237.6 km^{2} (863.9 sq mi)

Population (2010)
  - Total: 357,304
  - Density: 159.68/km^{2} (413.57/sq mi)
- Time zone: UTC+8 (China Standard)

Anlong County (simplified Chinese: 安龙县; traditional Chinese: 安龍縣; pinyin: Ānlóng Xiàn) is a county in the southwest of Guizhou province, China, bordering Guangxi to the south. It is under the administration of the Qianxinan Buyei and Miao Autonomous Prefecture.

== Administrative divisions ==
Anlong County is divided into 5 subdistricts and 10 towns:

subdistricts

- Zhaodi 招堤街道
- Qifeng 栖凤街道
- Qianxiang 钱相街道
- Wufu 五福街道
- Chuntan 春潭街道

towns

- Longguang 龙广镇
- Dewo 德卧镇
- Wanfenghu 万峰湖镇
- Muzan 木咱镇
- Sayu 洒雨镇
- Puping 普坪镇
- Longshan 龙山镇
- Xinqiao 新桥镇
- Haizi 海子镇
- Dushan 笃山镇

== Wildlife ==
Lungtou frog or Anlung odorous frog, Odorrana anlungensis, is only known from Mount Longtou in Anlong County.

== Climate ==
Climate data for Anlong, elevation 1,395 m (4,577 ft), (1991–2020 normals, extremes 1981–present)
Month	Jan	Feb	Mar	Apr	May	Jun	Jul	Aug	Sep	Oct	Nov	Dec	Year
Record high °C (°F)	25.4 (77.7)	27.9 (82.2)	31.4 (88.5)	33.2 (91.8)	33.8 (92.8)	32.5 (90.5)	31.4 (88.5)	32.4 (90.3)	33.9 (93.0)	30.0 (86.0)	26.4 (79.5)	25.2 (77.4)	33.9 (93.0)
Mean daily maximum °C (°F)	10.9 (51.6)	14.2 (57.6)	18.4 (65.1)	22.8 (73.0)	24.7 (76.5)	25.5 (77.9)	26.3 (79.3)	26.2 (79.2)	24.2 (75.6)	20.1 (68.2)	17.1 (62.8)	12.3 (54.1)	20.2 (68.4)
Daily mean °C (°F)	6.5 (43.7)	9.1 (48.4)	12.8 (55.0)	17.2 (63.0)	19.7 (67.5)	21.3 (70.3)	22.0 (71.6)	21.5 (70.7)	19.5 (67.1)	15.9 (60.6)	12.4 (54.3)	7.9 (46.2)	15.5 (59.9)
Mean daily minimum °C (°F)	3.9 (39.0)	6.0 (42.8)	9.3 (48.7)	13.5 (56.3)	16.3 (61.3)	18.4 (65.1)	19.1 (66.4)	18.5 (65.3)	16.4 (61.5)	13.3 (55.9)	9.3 (48.7)	5.2 (41.4)	12.4 (54.4)
Record low °C (°F)	−4.8 (23.4)	−3.6 (25.5)	−3.5 (25.7)	2.8 (37.0)	7.3 (45.1)	11.4 (52.5)	11.7 (53.1)	12.1 (53.8)	6.5 (43.7)	3.5 (38.3)	−1.7 (28.9)	−5.1 (22.8)	−5.1 (22.8)
Average precipitation mm (inches)	25.2 (0.99)	19.8 (0.78)	37.5 (1.48)	58.5 (2.30)	153.5 (6.04)	228.0 (8.98)	240.1 (9.45)	176.8 (6.96)	104.2 (4.10)	86.6 (3.41)	35.9 (1.41)	17.9 (0.70)	1,184 (46.6)
Average precipitation days (≥ 0.1 mm)	13.5	11.2	11.9	12.5	14.7	17.4	18.2	16.4	12.6	14.3	9.4	10.5	162.6
Average snowy days	2.7	1.1	0.2	0	0	0	0	0	0	0	0.1	0.7	4.8
Average relative humidity (%)	83	78	76	74	76	82	84	84	82	84	81	81	80
Mean monthly sunshine hours	85.5	105.8	132.8	162.4	167.9	131.1	154.0	165.4	140.1	105.8	125.4	94.8	1,571
Percentage possible sunshine	26	33	35	42	40	32	37	42	38	30	39	29	35
Source: China Meteorological Administrationall-time October record
