= Maguan County =

Maguan County 马关县 · Majgvanh Yen
- County
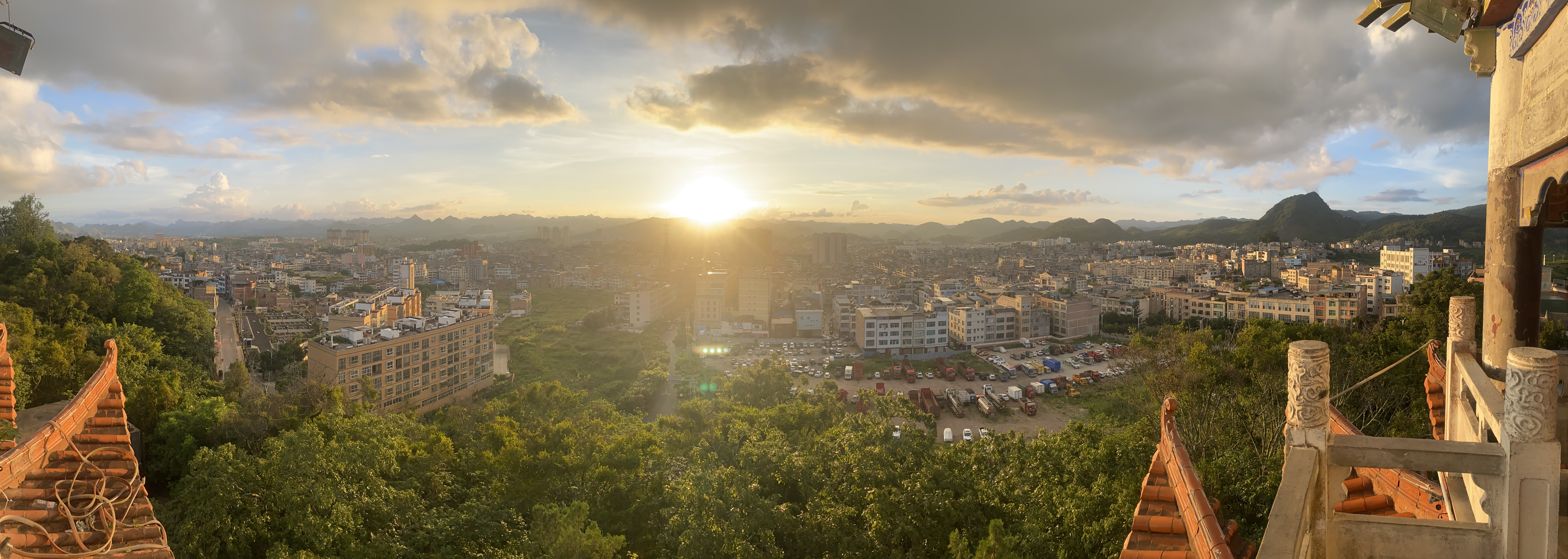
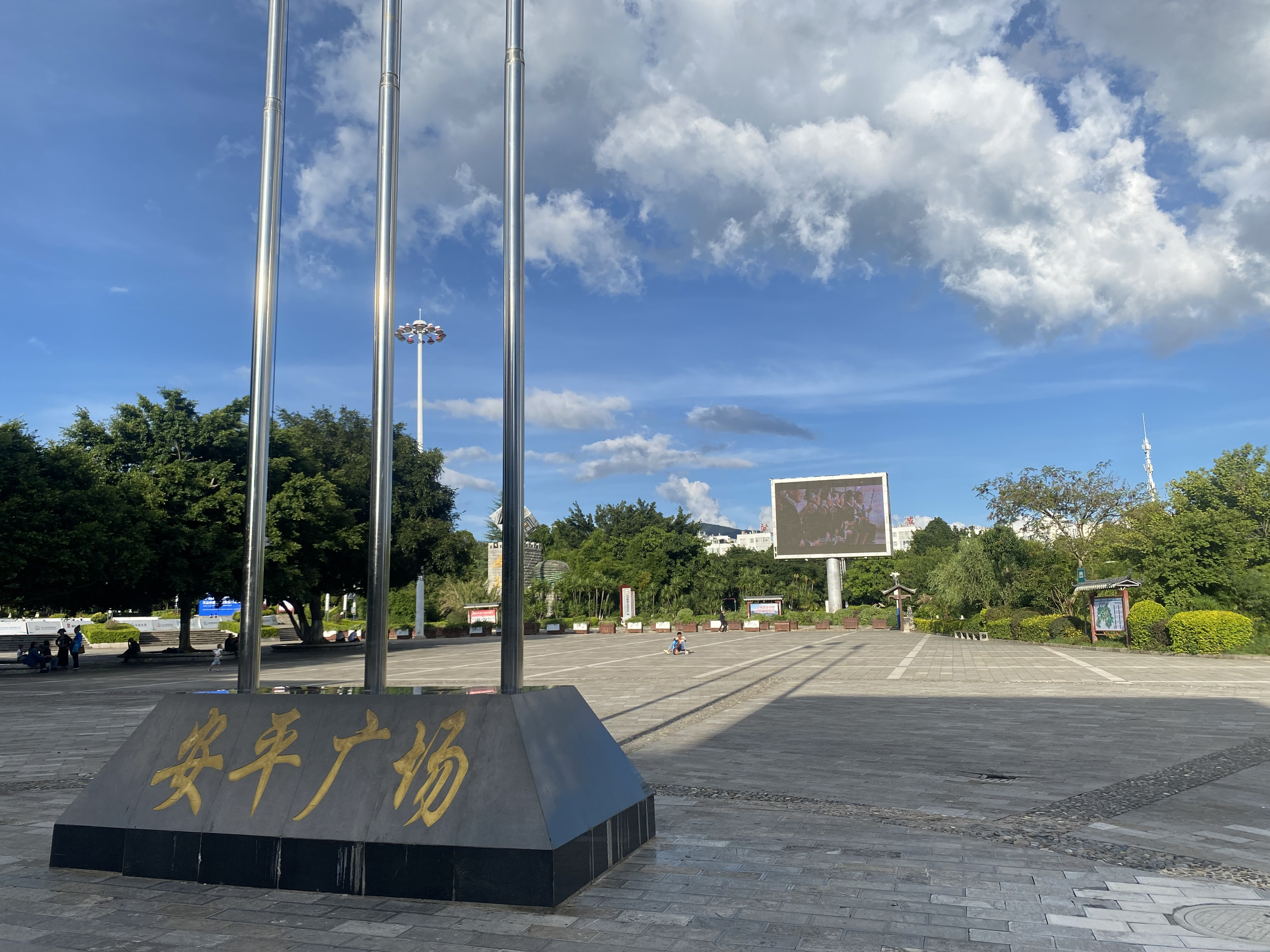
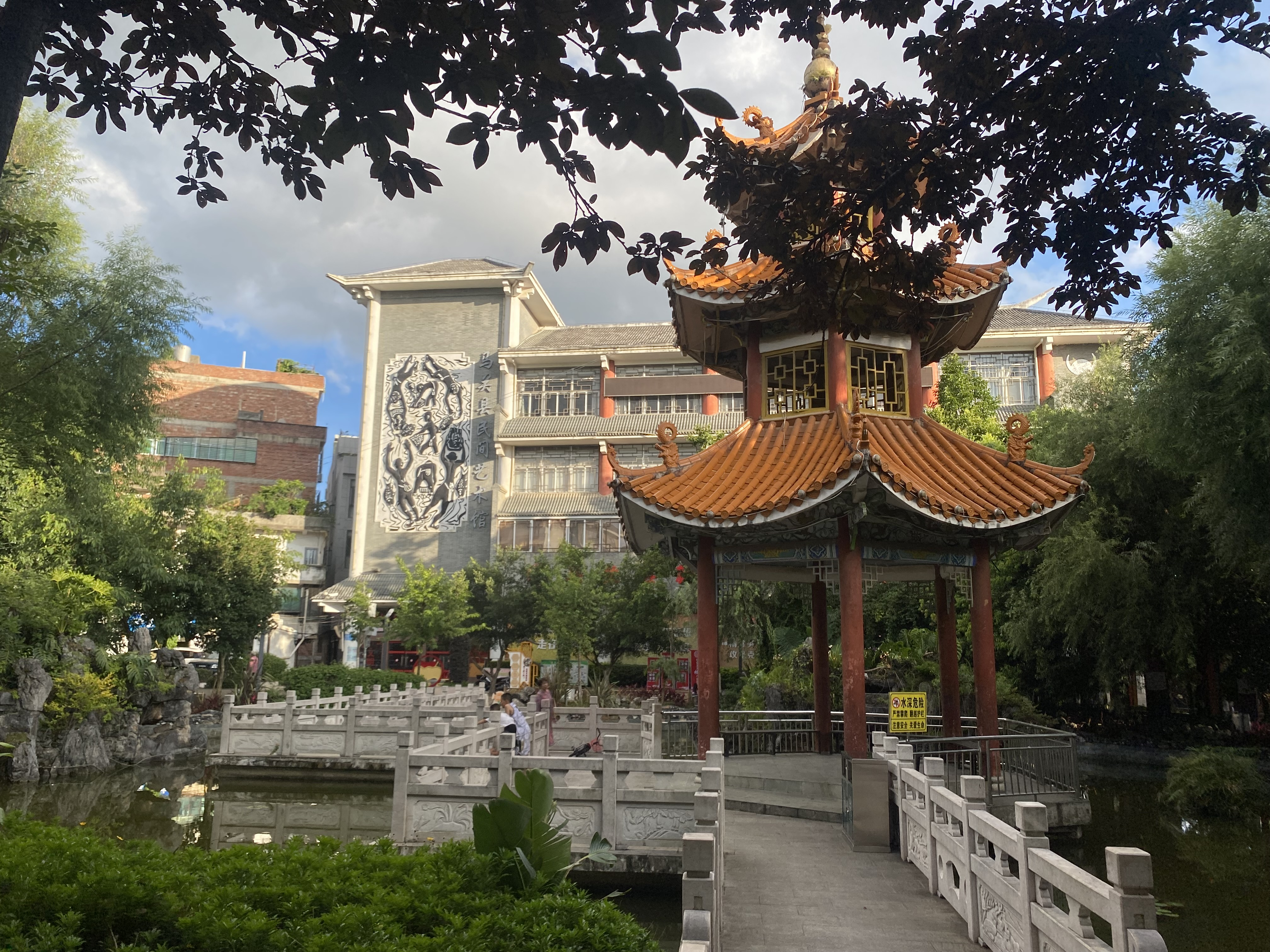
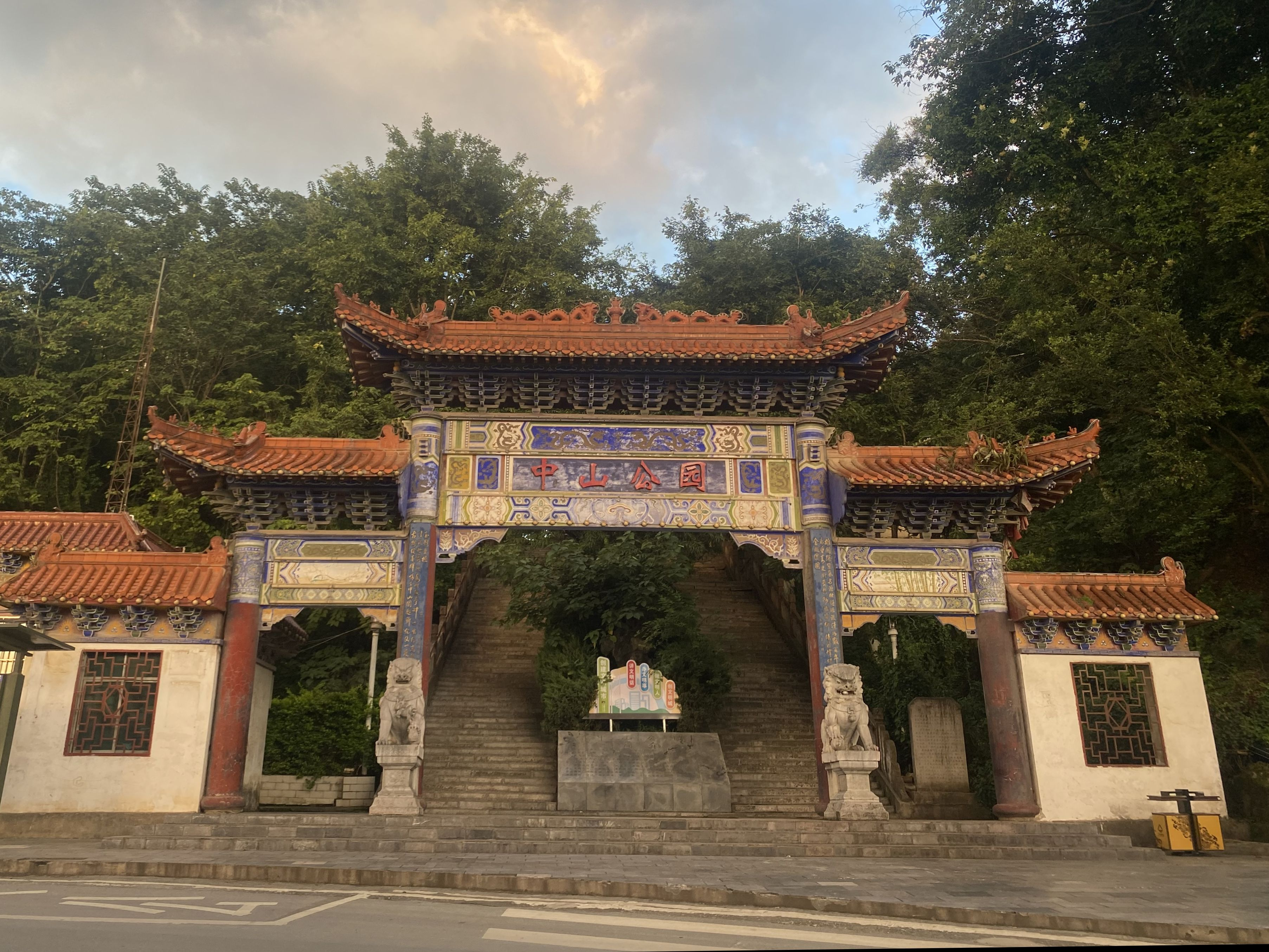
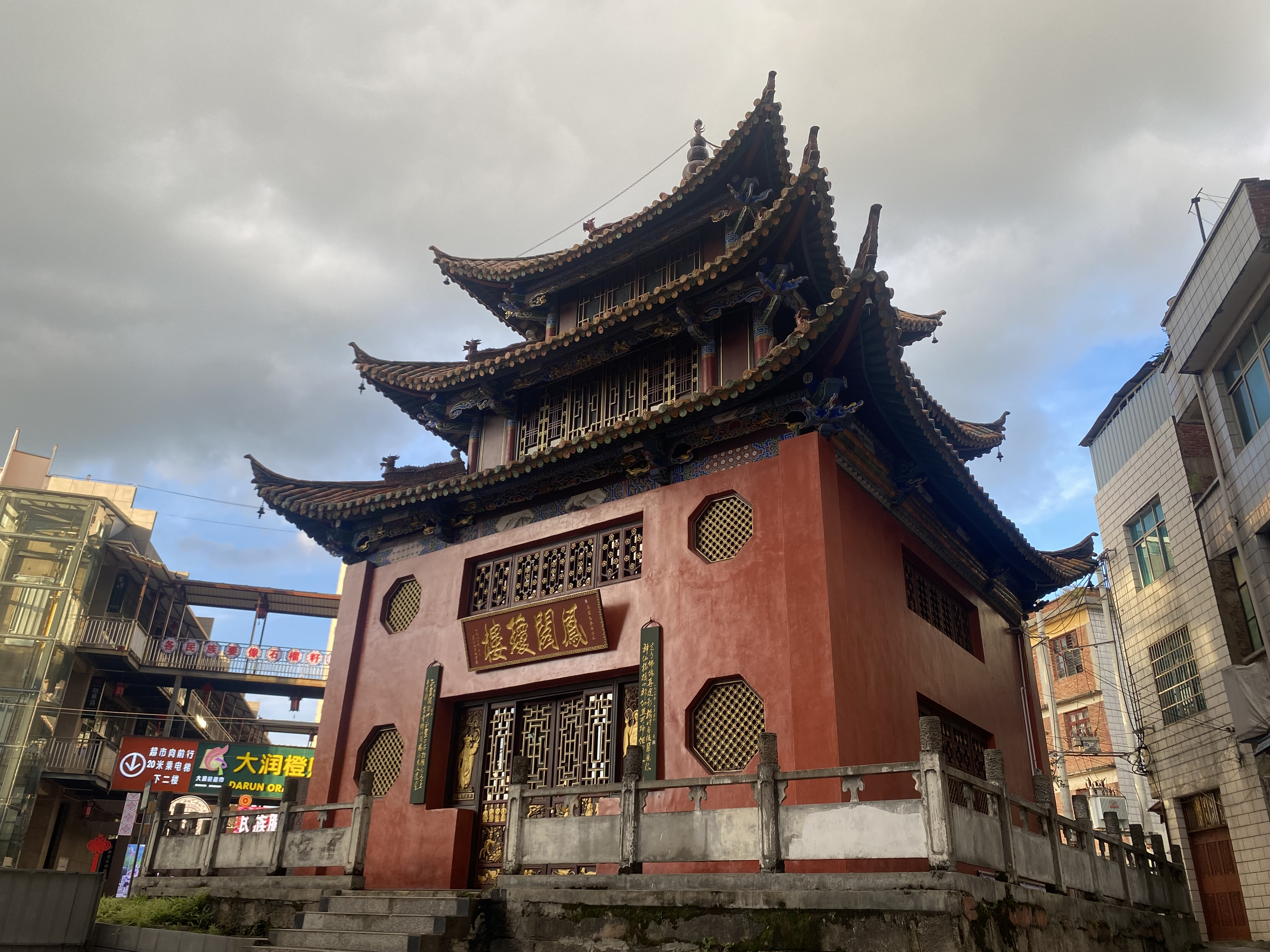
- Cityscape of county town Anping Square Yushui Park Zhongshan Park Yuhuang Pavilion

- Location of Maguan County (red) and Wenshan Prefecture (pink) within Yunnan province of China

- Location within Yunnan
- Coordinates: 23°00′30″N 104°23′34″E
- Country: China
- Province: Yunnan
- Autonomous prefecture: Wenshan
- County seat: Mabai

Area
  - Total: 2,767 km^{2} (1,068 sq mi)

Population (2020 census)
  - Total: 318,704
  - Density: 115.2/km^{2} (298.3/sq mi)
- Time zone: UTC+8 (CST)
- Postal code: 663700
- Area code: 0876
- Website: www.ynmg.gov.cn

Maguan County (simplified Chinese: 马关县; traditional Chinese: 馬關縣; pinyin: Mǎguān Xiàn; lit. 'horse pass', Vietnamese: Mã Quan) is located in Wenshan Zhuang and Miao Autonomous Prefecture, Yunnan province, China, bordering Vietnam's Lào Cai and Ha Giang provinces to the south.

== Geography ==
Maguan County is located in the southwest of Wenshan Prefecture, in southeastern Yunnan. It borders Malipo County to the east, Hekou County and Pingbian County to the west, Wenshan City to the north and Xichou County to the northeast. It also borders Vietnam through Tuyên Quang Province to the southeast and Lào Cai Province to the southwest.

== Administrative divisions ==
In the present, Maguan County has 9 towns and 4 townships.

9 towns

- Mabai (马白镇)
- Bazhai (八寨镇)
- Renhe (仁和镇)
- Muchang (木厂镇)
- Jiahanqing (夹寒箐镇)
- Xiaobazi (小坝子镇)
- Doulong (都龙镇)
- Jinchang (金厂镇)
- Pojiao (坡脚镇)

4 townships

- Nanlao (南捞乡)
- Dalishu (大栗树乡)
- Miechang (篾厂乡)
- Gulinqing (古林箐乡)

== Ethnic groups ==
The Maguan County Gazetteer (马关县志) (1996) lists the following ethnic subgroups.

- Han
- Zhuang
- Buyi
- Dai
- Miao
- Yao
- Yi (Lolo)
  - Pu 仆 (autonyms: Toulapa 托拉葩 and Alapa 阿拉葩), related to the Phù Lá in Vietnam
  - Luo 倮 (autonyms: Luomo 罗摩 and Lemo 勒摩)
- Mongol
- Laji (拉基)

== Transport ==
- Nearest airport: Wenshan Airport

== Climate ==
Climate data for Maguan, elevation 1,333 m (4,373 ft), (1991–2020 normals, extremes 1981–present)
Month	Jan	Feb	Mar	Apr	May	Jun	Jul	Aug	Sep	Oct	Nov	Dec	Year
Record high °C (°F)	26.0 (78.8)	28.0 (82.4)	31.7 (89.1)	32.4 (90.3)	33.3 (91.9)	31.2 (88.2)	32.1 (89.8)	32.4 (90.3)	32.8 (91.0)	29.3 (84.7)	27.2 (81.0)	25.0 (77.0)	33.3 (91.9)
Mean daily maximum °C (°F)	15.3 (59.5)	17.6 (63.7)	21.7 (71.1)	24.8 (76.6)	26.1 (79.0)	26.6 (79.9)	26.5 (79.7)	26.7 (80.1)	25.5 (77.9)	22.5 (72.5)	20.0 (68.0)	16.4 (61.5)	22.5 (72.5)
Daily mean °C (°F)	10.6 (51.1)	12.4 (54.3)	15.8 (60.4)	19.2 (66.6)	21.2 (70.2)	22.4 (72.3)	22.2 (72.0)	21.9 (71.4)	20.6 (69.1)	18.1 (64.6)	14.8 (58.6)	11.3 (52.3)	17.5 (63.6)
Mean daily minimum °C (°F)	7.8 (46.0)	9.1 (48.4)	12.2 (54.0)	15.4 (59.7)	17.8 (64.0)	19.6 (67.3)	19.6 (67.3)	19.1 (66.4)	17.7 (63.9)	15.4 (59.7)	11.6 (52.9)	8.4 (47.1)	14.5 (58.1)
Record low °C (°F)	−2.0 (28.4)	−0.8 (30.6)	−1.0 (30.2)	5.7 (42.3)	9.5 (49.1)	11.0 (51.8)	14.1 (57.4)	12.7 (54.9)	8.7 (47.7)	5.6 (42.1)	−0.1 (31.8)	−3.8 (25.2)	−3.8 (25.2)
Average precipitation mm (inches)	30.9 (1.22)	21.0 (0.83)	50.4 (1.98)	76.7 (3.02)	151.0 (5.94)	197.4 (7.77)	270.0 (10.63)	237.6 (9.35)	133.1 (5.24)	82.1 (3.23)	38.8 (1.53)	26.9 (1.06)	1,315.9 (51.8)
Average precipitation days (≥ 0.1 mm)	11.1	11.1	10.2	12.6	15.7	20.3	22.1	22.2	15.5	14.0	9.3	9.2	173.3
Average snowy days	0.4	0	0.1	0	0	0	0	0	0	0	0	0.1	0.6
Average relative humidity (%)	85	83	80	78	79	84	86	85	83	84	83	83	83
Mean monthly sunshine hours	121.8	135.3	167.4	195.2	201.4	156.8	146.0	155.0	144.6	120.7	147.7	130.9	1,822.8
Percentage possible sunshine	36	42	45	51	49	39	35	39	40	34	45	40	41
Source: China Meteorological Administrationall-time October record
