= Malipo County =

Malipo County 麻栗坡县 · Mazliboh Yen
- County
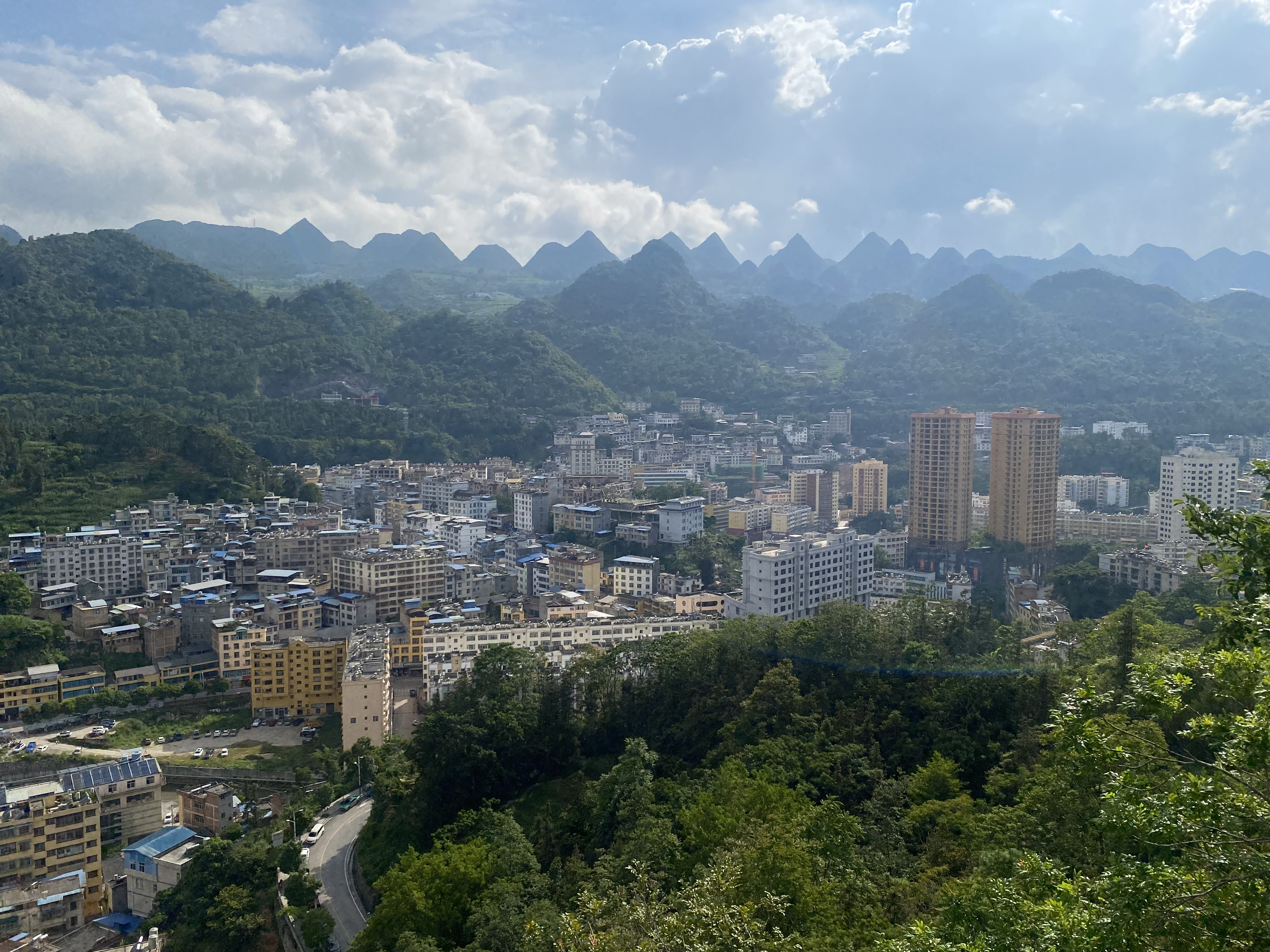
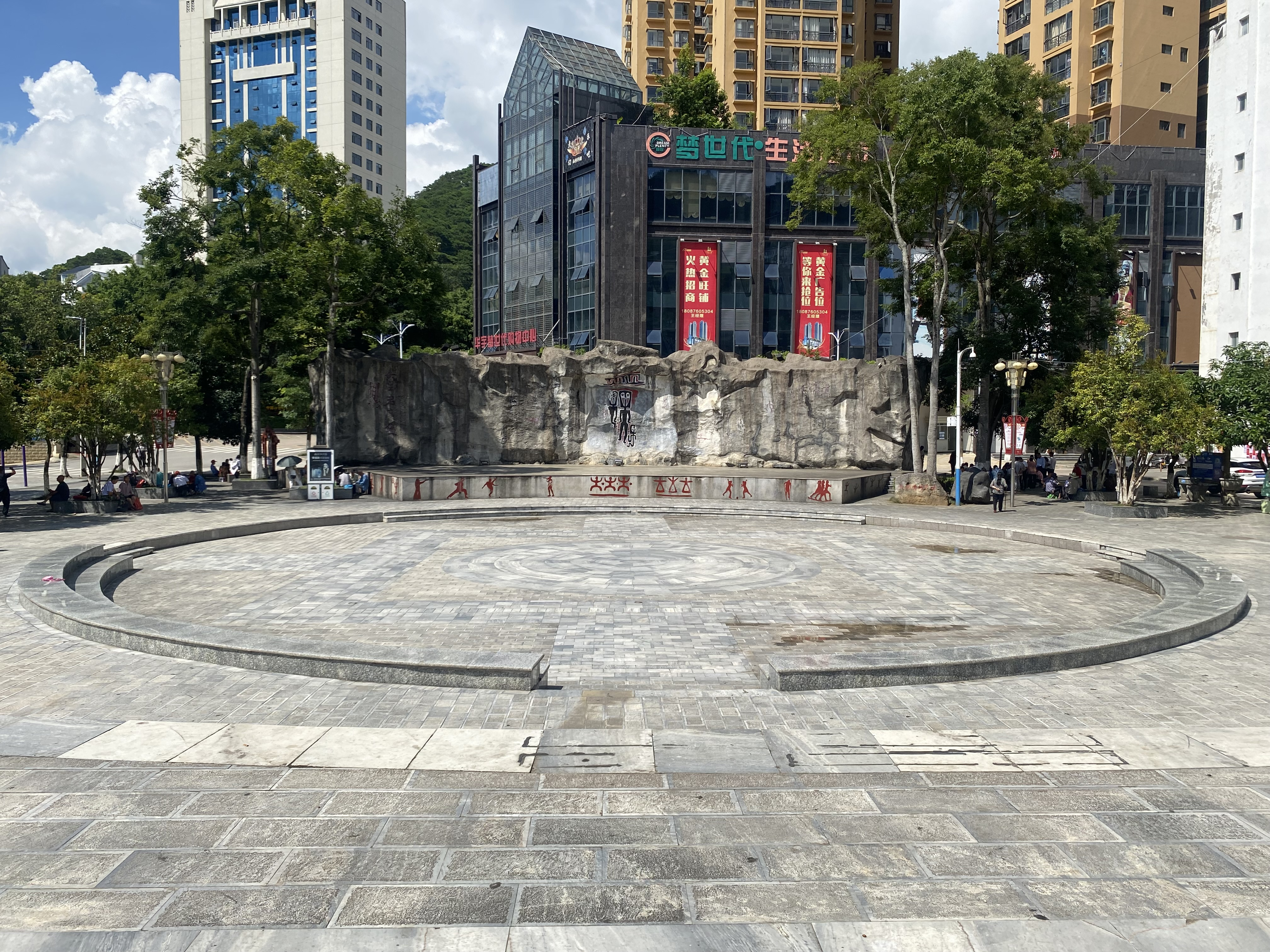
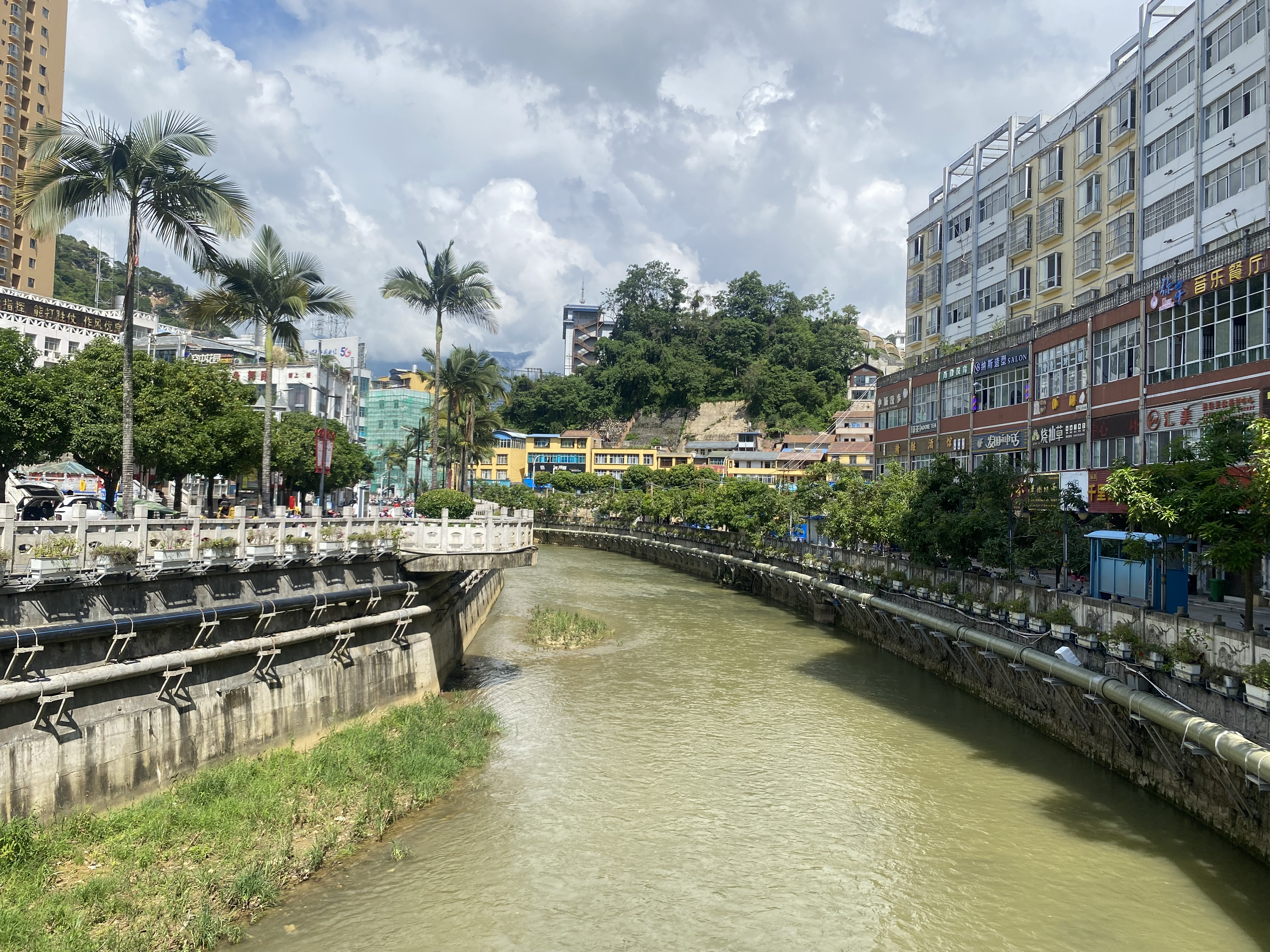
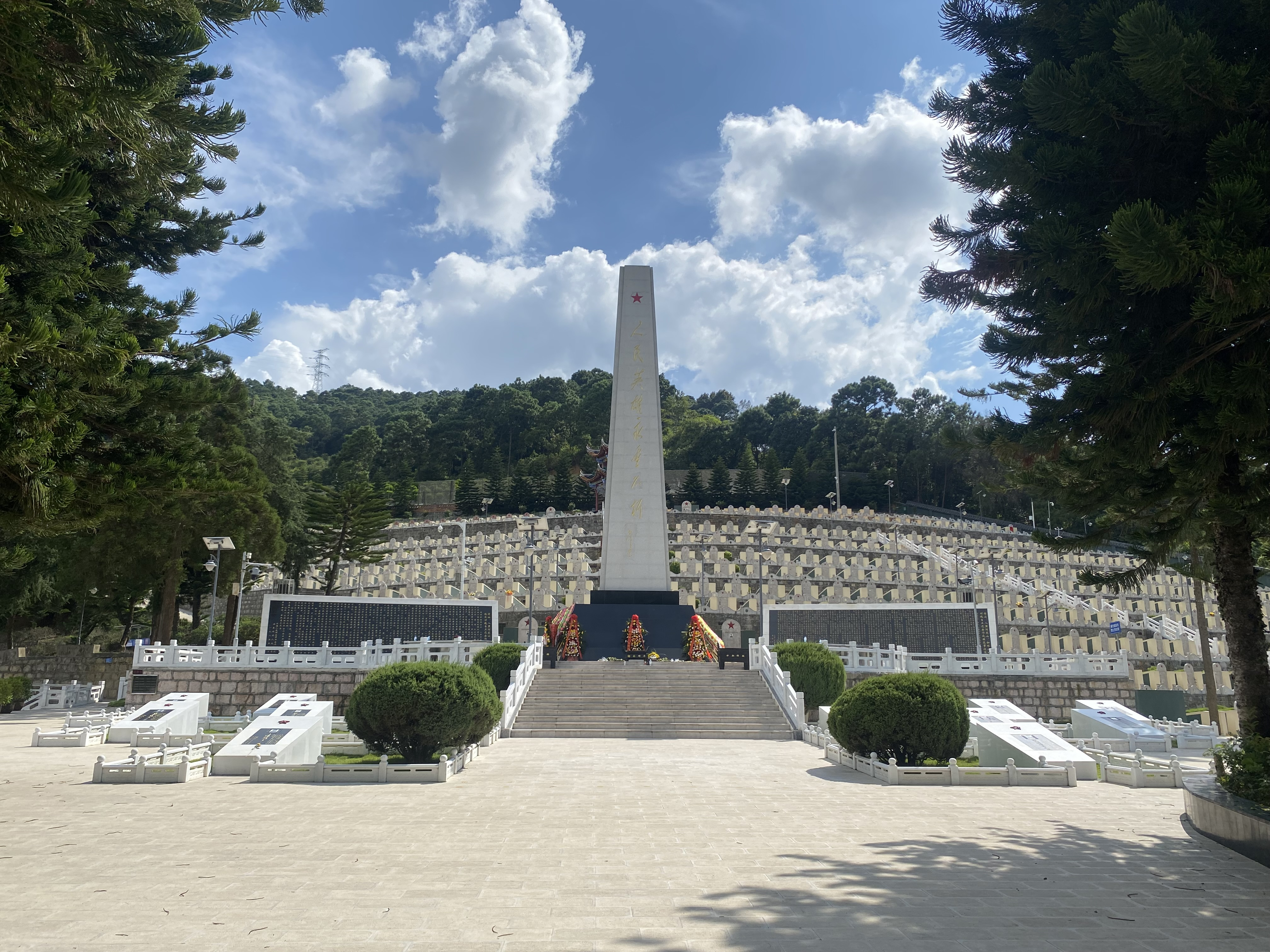
- Cityscape of county town Great King Rock Square Chouyang River Malipo Martyrs Cemetery

- Location of Malipo County (red) and Wenshan Prefecture (pink) within Yunnan province of China

- Location within Yunnan
- Coordinates: 23°07′32″N 104°42′11″E
- Country: China
- Province: Yunnan
- Autonomous prefecture: Wenshan
- County seat: Mali

Area
  - Total: 2,395 km^{2} (925 sq mi)

Population (2020 census)
  - Total: 243,587
  - Density: 101.7/km^{2} (263.4/sq mi)
- Time zone: UTC+8 (CST)
- Postal code: 663600
- Area code: 0876
- Website: www.ynmlp.gov.cn

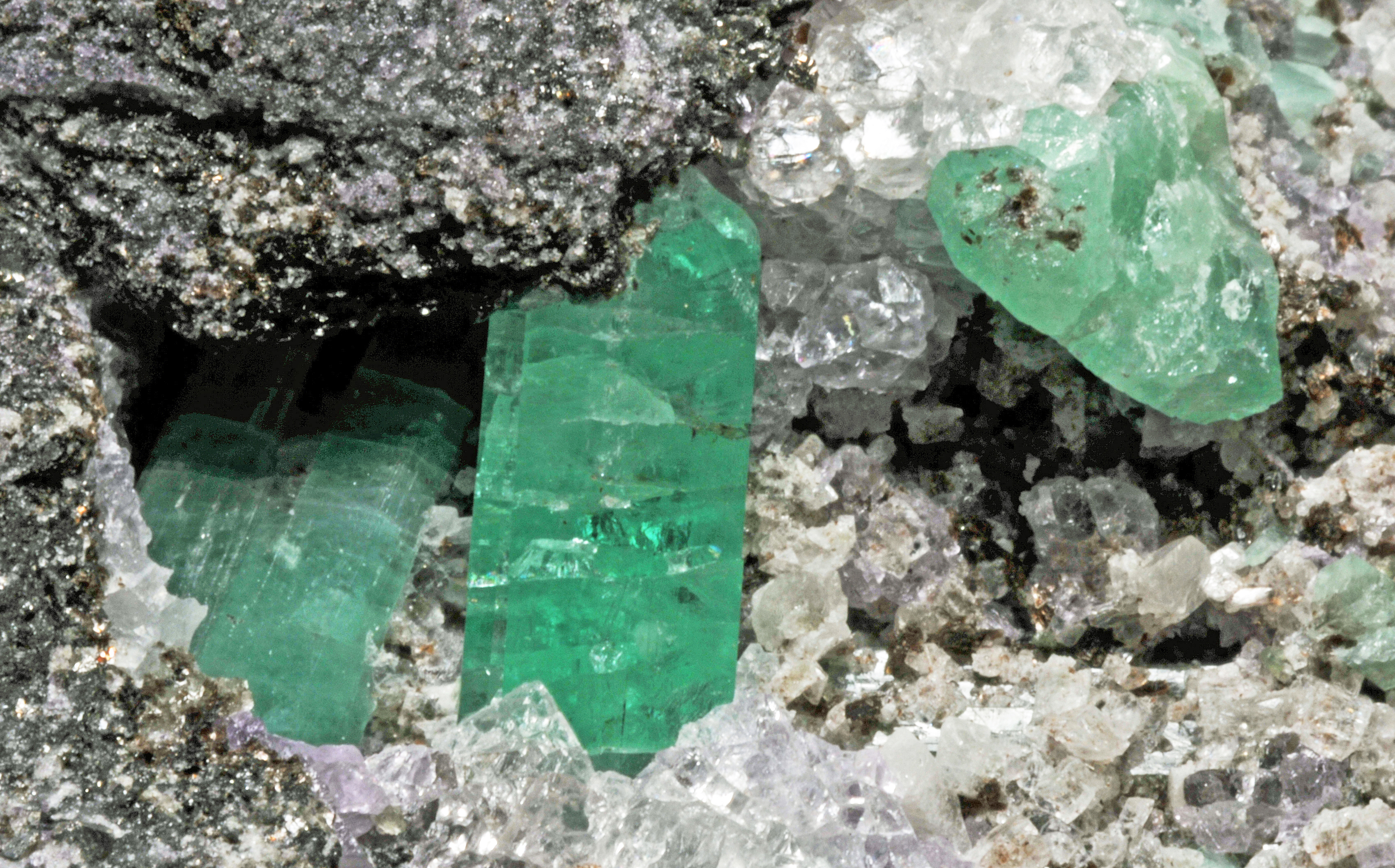
Emerald crystals, Dayakou emerald mine, Malipo County

Malipo County (Chinese: 麻栗坡县; pinyin: Málìpō Xiàn) is under the administration of the Wenshan Zhuang and Miao Autonomous Prefecture, in the southeast of Yunnan province, China, bordering Tuyên Quang province to the southeast.

== Geography ==
Malipo County is located in the south of Wenshan Prefecture, in southeastern Yunnan. It borders Funing County, Yunnan and Guangnan County to the northeast, Xichou County to the north, and Maguan County to the southwest. To the southeast, it borders Tuyên Quang province, Vietnam.

== Administrative divisions ==
Malipo County has 4 towns, 6 townships and 1 ethnic township.

4 towns

- Mali (麻栗镇)
- Daping (大坪镇)
- Donggan (董干镇)
- Tianbao (天保镇)

6 townships

- Xiajinchang (下金厂乡)
- Babu (八布乡)
- Liuhe (六河乡)
- Yangwan (杨万乡)
- Tiechang (铁厂乡)
- Majie (马街乡)

1 ethnic township

- Mengdong Yao Ethnic Township (猛硐瑶族乡)

== Ethnic groups ==
The following list of ethnic groups and subgroups, and their respective distributions, is from the Malipo County Gazetteer (2000).

- Han: 152,407 people (1990)
- Zhuang: 30,706 people (1990)
- Miao: 41,620 people (1990)
  - White Miao 白苗 (autonym: Mengdou 蒙逗): Donggan, Xinzhai, Majie, Tiechang
  - Flowery Miao 花苗 (autonyms: Mengcai 蒙彩, Mengleng 蒙冷, Mengshe 蒙舍): Malipo Town, Daping, Mengdong, Nanwenhe, Xiajinchang, Babu, Liuhe, Yangwan
  - Black Miao 黑苗 (autonym: Mengduo 蒙夺): Dongyou 东油, Jiangdong 江东 of Babu Township 八布乡
  - Green Miao 青苗 (autonym: Mengzhao 蒙诏): Chonggan 铳干, Yangwan Township 杨万乡 and Tanshan 炭山, Babu Township 八布乡
- Yao: 17,925 people (1990)
  - Landian [Blue Indigo] Yao 蓝靛瑶 (autonyms: Men 门, Jinmen 金门)
  - Horned Yao 角瑶 (autonym: You Mian 尤棉)
- Yi: 5,212 people (1990)
  - White Luo 白倮, also Hairy Lolo 毛倮倮 due to their long hair (autonym: Muyasang 木亚桑): Xinzhai 新寨 and Chengzhai 城寨 villages of Xinzhai Township 新寨乡; entered Malipo County during the Qing dynasty
  - Flowery Luo 花倮, formerly Head-Cutting Luo 砍头倮 (autonyms: Muji 木吉, Egao 呃稿): Mabeng 马崩, Yongli 永利, and Zhelong 者挖 villages of Donggan Township 董干镇; entered the Donggan area at the end of the Ming dynasty and beginning of the Qing dynasty. They are related to the Flower Lolo people of Ha Giang, Vietnam.
  - Mengwu 孟武: Mada Village 马达, Daping Township 大坪镇; entered Malipo County at the end of the Ming dynasty and beginning of the Qing dynasty.
  - Pubiao 普标, historically Woni 窝泥, and Pubiao Lolo 普标倮倮 during the Republic of China era (autonym: Geibiao 给标): Punong 普弄, Pufeng 普峰, Longlong 竜/龙龙, and other villages. Their ancestors were reported to have migrated from a location called Dayandong 大岩洞 in Pumei 普梅 or gə³³mei³³(also called Puyang 普阳 or gə³³wan⁵⁵).
  - Laji 拉基: Maoping 茅坪, Yuhuang 玉皇; Nanwenhe Township 南温河乡, where they were one of the earliest inhabitants; entered Malipo County at the end of the Ming dynasty and beginning of the Qing dynasty from a place called Amizhou 阿迷州
- Dai: 2,664 people (1990), mostly in Nanwenhe Township 南温河乡
- Gelao: 1,166 people (1990); entered Malipo County at the end of the Ming dynasty and beginning of the Qing dynasty from Guizhou and Guangnan County
  - White Gelao 白仡佬
  - Flowery Gelao 花仡佬
  - Green/Bamboo Gelao 青/箐仡佬
- Mongol: 1,211 people (1990)

== Climate ==
Climate data for Malipo, elevation 1,093 m (3,586 ft), (1991–2020 normals, extremes 1991–present)
Month	Jan	Feb	Mar	Apr	May	Jun	Jul	Aug	Sep	Oct	Nov	Dec	Year
Record high °C (°F)	26.4 (79.5)	31.1 (88.0)	34.0 (93.2)	35.2 (95.4)	36.6 (97.9)	35.4 (95.7)	34.9 (94.8)	35.7 (96.3)	34.7 (94.5)	30.8 (87.4)	28.7 (83.7)	25.1 (77.2)	36.6 (97.9)
Mean daily maximum °C (°F)	15.0 (59.0)	17.1 (62.8)	20.5 (68.9)	24.5 (76.1)	26.7 (80.1)	27.6 (81.7)	27.7 (81.9)	28.0 (82.4)	26.8 (80.2)	23.7 (74.7)	20.6 (69.1)	16.6 (61.9)	22.9 (73.2)
Daily mean °C (°F)	10.9 (51.6)	12.6 (54.7)	15.7 (60.3)	19.4 (66.9)	21.9 (71.4)	23.2 (73.8)	23.2 (73.8)	22.9 (73.2)	21.6 (70.9)	18.9 (66.0)	15.3 (59.5)	11.7 (53.1)	18.1 (64.6)
Mean daily minimum °C (°F)	8.3 (46.9)	9.8 (49.6)	12.9 (55.2)	16.3 (61.3)	18.7 (65.7)	20.5 (68.9)	20.7 (69.3)	20.1 (68.2)	18.6 (65.5)	16.2 (61.2)	12.2 (54.0)	8.8 (47.8)	15.3 (59.5)
Record low °C (°F)	−0.7 (30.7)	0.2 (32.4)	3.2 (37.8)	5.8 (42.4)	10.1 (50.2)	13.6 (56.5)	15.0 (59.0)	13.9 (57.0)	10.7 (51.3)	7.3 (45.1)	2.6 (36.7)	−2.1 (28.2)	−2.1 (28.2)
Average precipitation mm (inches)	21.6 (0.85)	15.6 (0.61)	39.7 (1.56)	60.4 (2.38)	104.4 (4.11)	154.8 (6.09)	217.0 (8.54)	201.3 (7.93)	103.9 (4.09)	55.7 (2.19)	28.6 (1.13)	19.7 (0.78)	1,022.7 (40.26)
Average precipitation days (≥ 0.1 mm)	9.3	8.4	9.1	10.7	14.7	18.0	20.9	20.6	13.6	11.3	7.4	6.6	150.6
Average snowy days	0.2	0	0	0	0	0	0	0	0	0	0	0	0.2
Average relative humidity (%)	88	86	86	83	82	85	86	86	84	85	85	85	85
Mean monthly sunshine hours	99.5	110.8	141.2	182.9	190.3	148.0	149.0	154.8	148.4	122.7	128.6	108.1	1,684.3
Percentage possible sunshine	29	34	38	48	46	37	36	39	41	34	39	33	38
Source: China Meteorological Administration

== Tourism ==
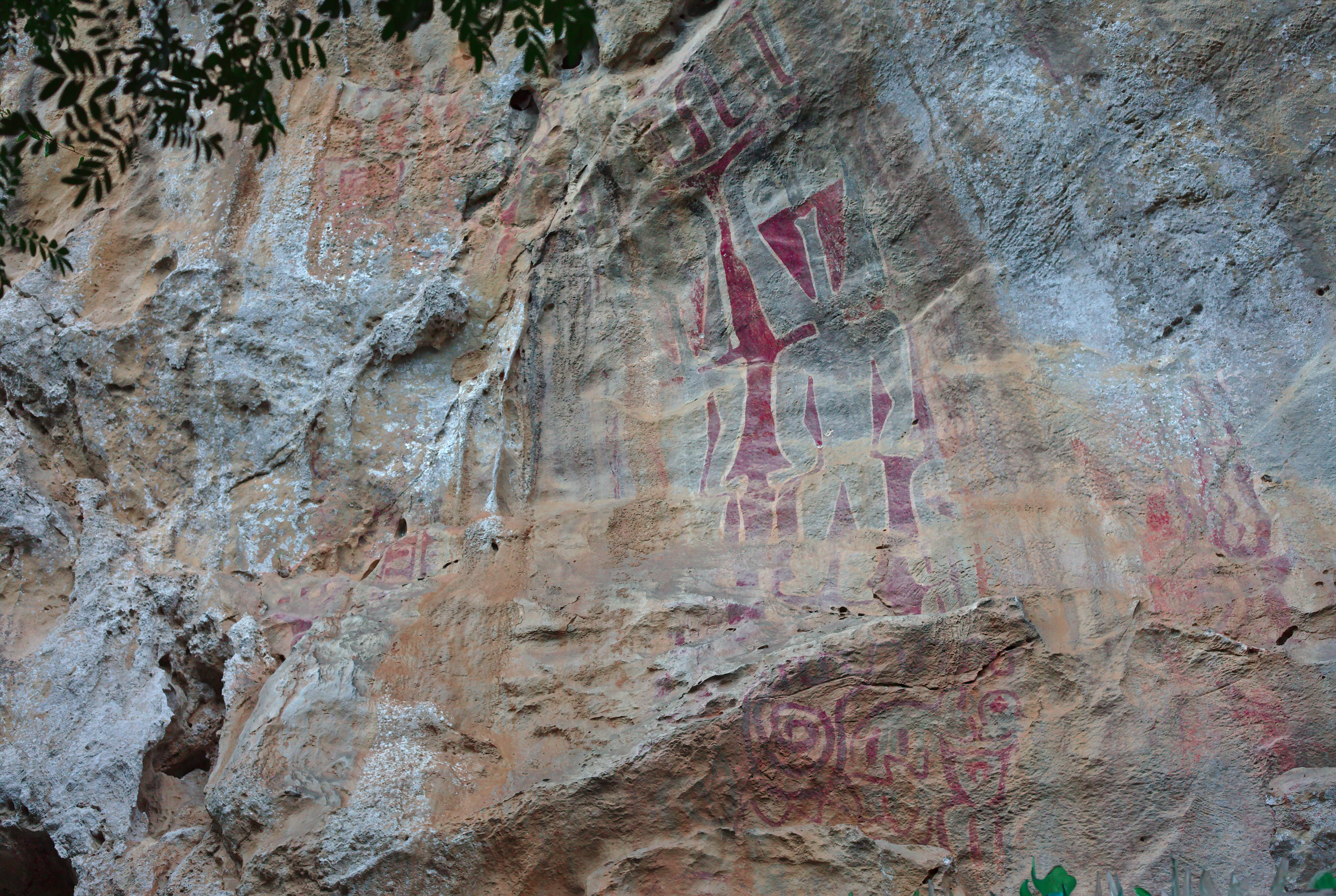
Neolithic painting at the 'Great King' painting site above Malipo in Wenshan prefecture, Yunnan province, China.

One major tourist attraction is the Neolithic rock art above Malipo itself, apparently known as the 'Great King' site for the two dominant figures at the center of the artwork. It is said to be over 4000 years old.

== Transport ==
- Nearest airport: Wenshan Airport
