= Wenshan City =

Wenshan 文山市 · Vwnzsanh Si
- County-level city
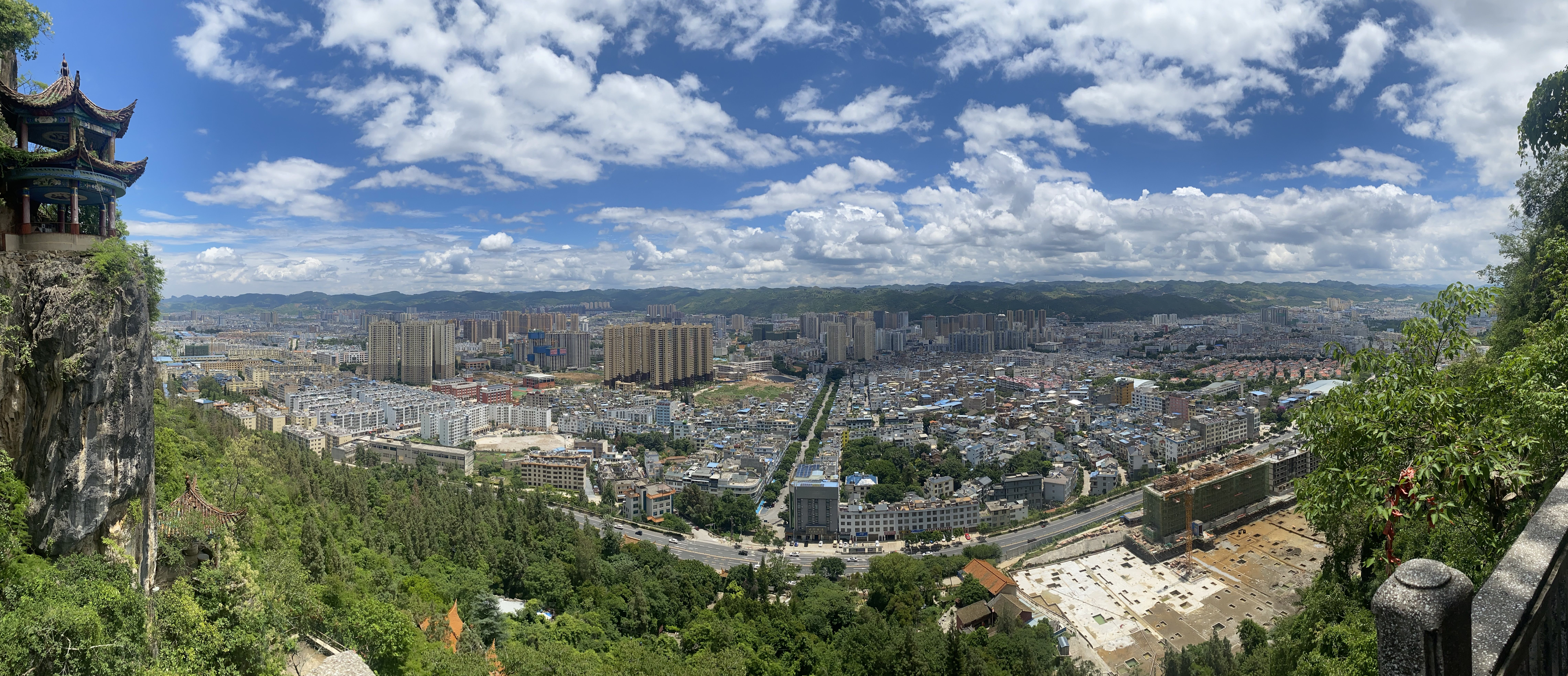
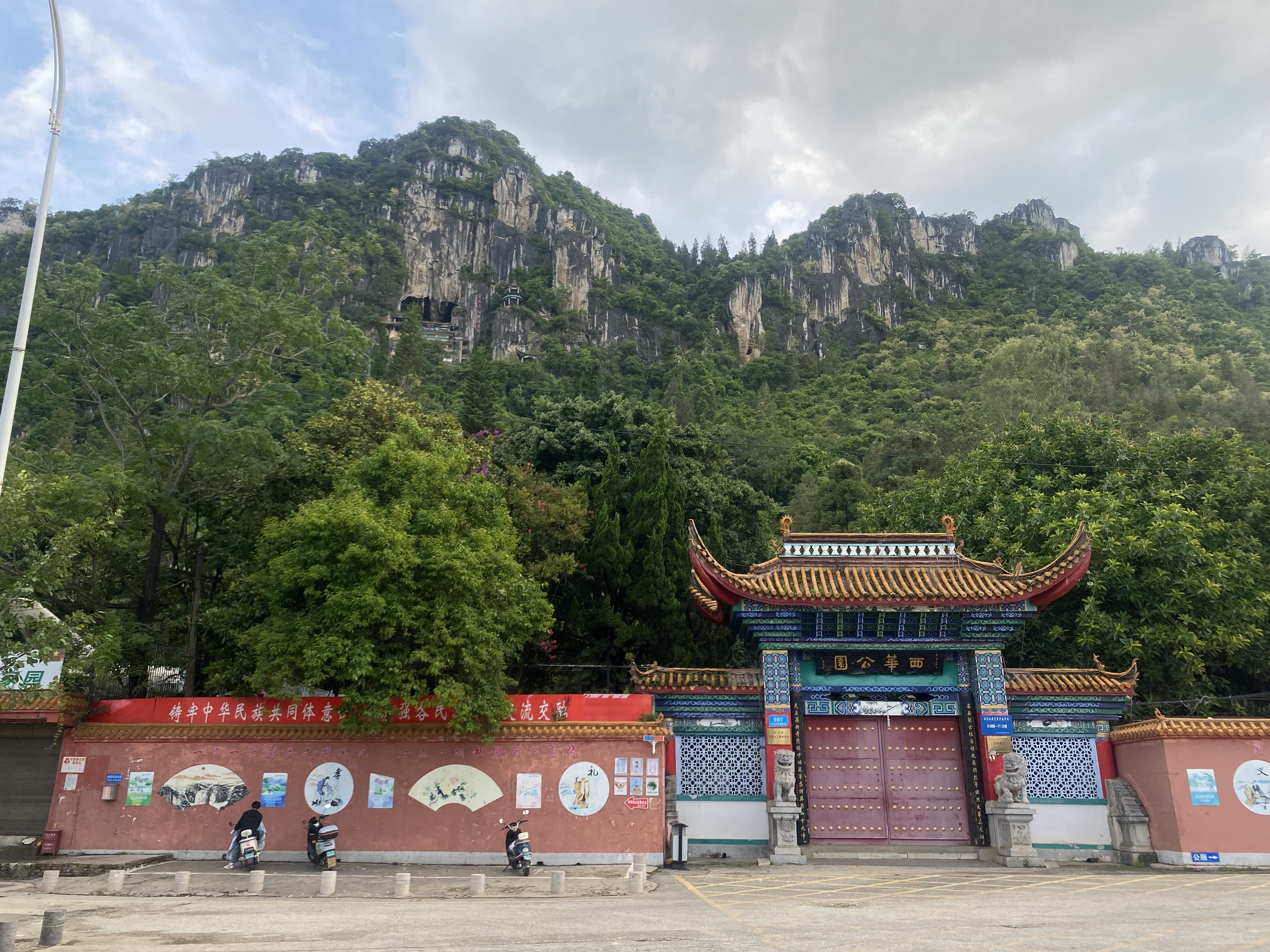
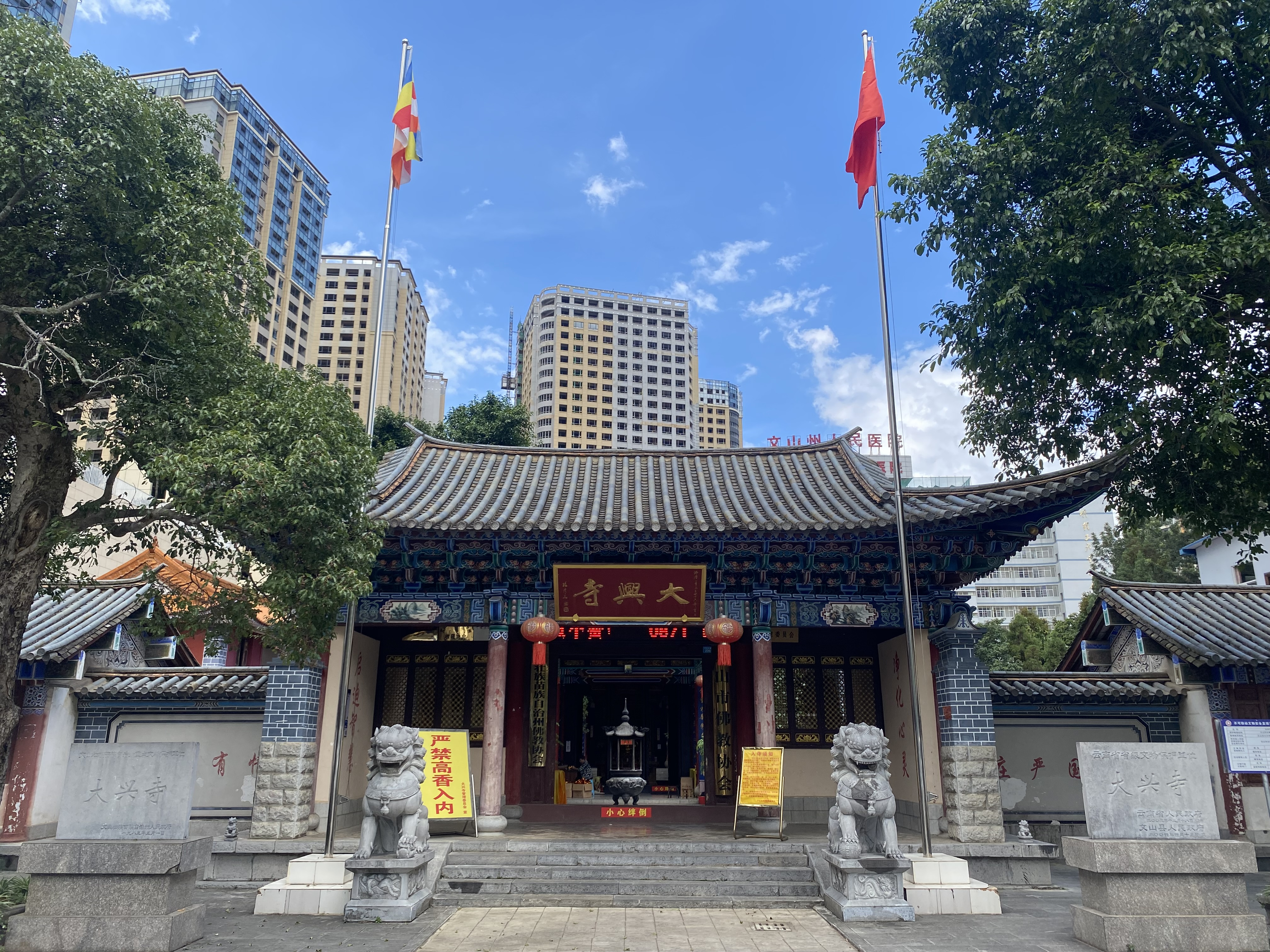
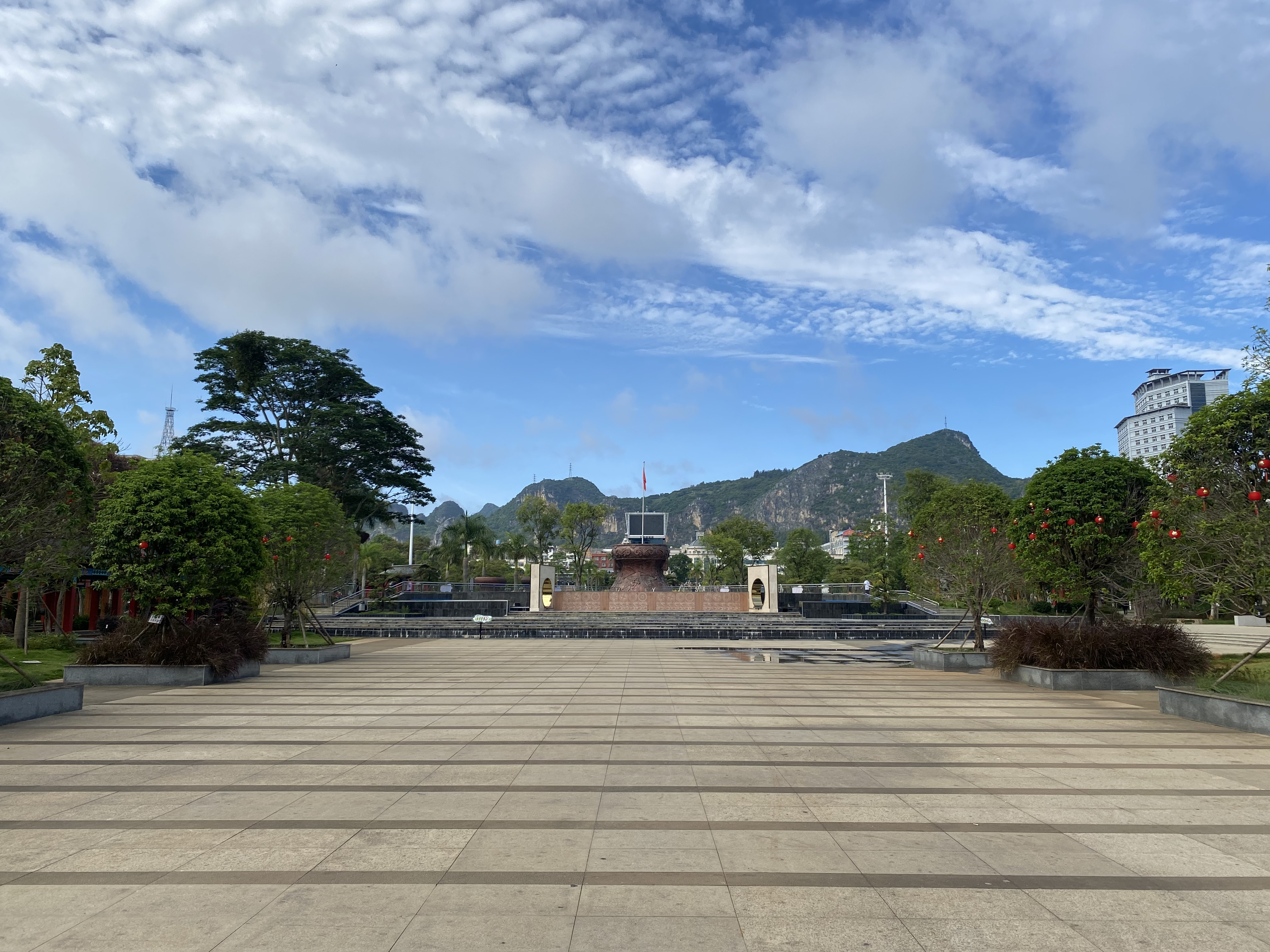
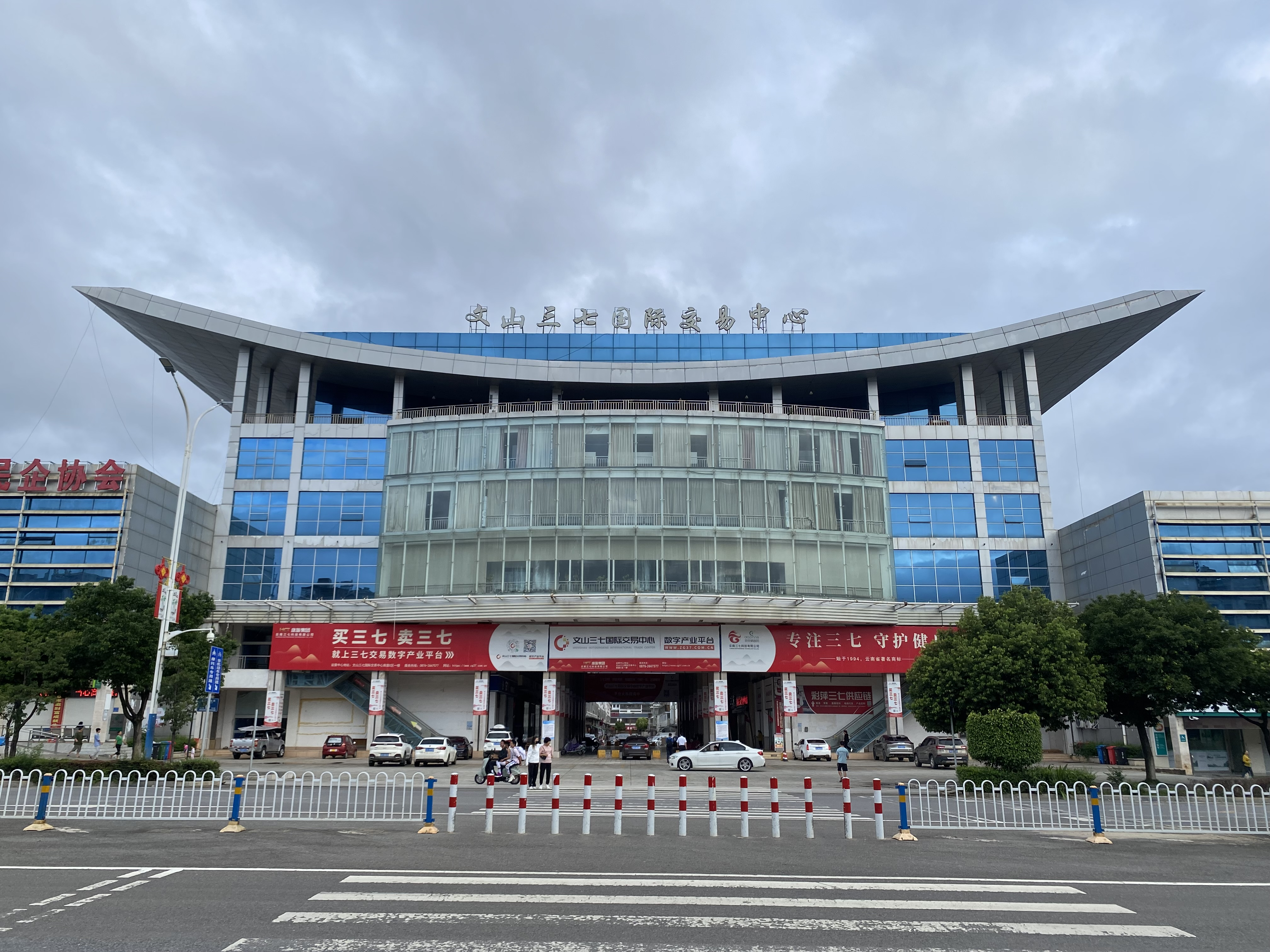
- Urban skyline Xihua Park Daxing Temple Qihua Square Wenshan Notoginseng International Trading Center

- Location of Wenshan City (red) within Wenshan Prefecture (pink) and Yunnan

- Location of the city centre in Yunnan Wenshan (China)
- Coordinates (Wenshan City government): 23°23′13″N 104°13′59″E
- Country: China
- Province: Yunnan
- Autonomous prefecture: Wenshan
- Municipal seat: Wolong Subdistrict

Area
  - Total: 2,966.86 km^{2} (1,145.51 sq mi)

Population (2020 census)
  - Total: 623,772
  - Density: 210.247/km^{2} (544.536/sq mi)
- Time zone: UTC+8 (China Standard)
- Postal code: 663000
- Area code: 0876
- Website: www.ynwss.gov.cn

Wenshan (Chinese: 文山市; pinyin: Wénshān Shì; Zhuang: Vwnzsanh Si), old name Kaihua, is a city in and the seat of Wenshan Zhuang and Miao Autonomous Prefecture, in the southeast of Yunnan province, People's Republic of China. It once was a county (Wenshan County; 文山县), but on 2 December 2010, with the approval of the PRC State Council, it was upgraded to a county-level city.

Wenshan City borders Yanshan County, Yunnan to the north, Xichou County to the southeast, Maguan County to the south, and Mengzi City and (across the river) Pingbian County to the west.

== Administrative divisions ==
Wenshan City has 3 subdistricts, 7 towns, 2 townships and 5 ethnic townships.

3 subdistricts

- Kaihua Subdistrict (开化街道)
- Wolong Subdistrict (卧龙街道)
- Xinping Subdistrict (新平街道)

7 towns

- Gumu (古木镇)
- Pingba (平坝镇)
- Matang (马塘镇)
- Dehou (德厚镇)
- Xiaojie (小街镇)
- Baozhu (薄竹镇)
- Zhuilijie (追栗街镇)

2 townships

- Xinjie Township (新街乡)
- Xigu Township (喜古乡)

5 ethnic townships

- Dongshan Yi Ethnic Township (东山彝族乡)
- Liujing Yi Ethnic Township (柳井彝族乡)
- Baxin Yi Ethnic Township (坝心彝族乡)
- Binglie Yi Ethnic Township (秉烈彝族乡)
- Hongdian Hui Ethnic Township (红甸回族乡)

Former
Longxi Township (龙溪乡), Xiacun Township (下村乡)

== Economy ==
One of the largest companies based in Wenshan County is the electric power supplier Yunnan Wenshan Electric Power Co., Ltd. It is listed on the Shanghai Stock Exchange.

The Wenshan Zinc Mine is known for producing world class, deep blue hemimorphite specimens.

Wenshan is a producer of 'Sanchi', a plant with medicinal properties which grows away from daylight under huge plastic sheets.

== Climate ==
Due to its low latitude tempered by its high elevation, Wenshan has a mild humid subtropical climate (Köppen Cwa) with short, mild, dry winters and warm, rainy summers. Wenshan is situated in the so-called 'Valley of Eternal Spring'. Because it is on a plateau, temperatures are quite constant throughout the year, with more precipitations during the summer months.

Climate data for Wenshan City, elevation 1,294 m (4,245 ft), (1991–2020 normals, extremes 1971–present)
Month	Jan	Feb	Mar	Apr	May	Jun	Jul	Aug	Sep	Oct	Nov	Dec	Year
Record high °C (°F)	29.2 (84.6)	32.6 (90.7)	33.4 (92.1)	35.2 (95.4)	36.2 (97.2)	34.4 (93.9)	33.9 (93.0)	34.1 (93.4)	34.6 (94.3)	31.7 (89.1)	30.3 (86.5)	29.1 (84.4)	36.2 (97.2)
Mean daily maximum °C (°F)	17.6 (63.7)	20.4 (68.7)	24.5 (76.1)	27.4 (81.3)	28.3 (82.9)	28.5 (83.3)	28.0 (82.4)	27.9 (82.2)	26.9 (80.4)	24.0 (75.2)	21.7 (71.1)	18.2 (64.8)	24.5 (76.0)
Daily mean °C (°F)	11.5 (52.7)	13.6 (56.5)	17.3 (63.1)	20.7 (69.3)	22.5 (72.5)	23.4 (74.1)	23.1 (73.6)	22.6 (72.7)	21.5 (70.7)	18.9 (66.0)	15.6 (60.1)	12.1 (53.8)	18.6 (65.4)
Mean daily minimum °C (°F)	7.9 (46.2)	9.5 (49.1)	12.7 (54.9)	16.1 (61.0)	18.6 (65.5)	20.2 (68.4)	20.2 (68.4)	19.6 (67.3)	18.2 (64.8)	15.8 (60.4)	11.8 (53.2)	8.4 (47.1)	14.9 (58.9)
Record low °C (°F)	−2.9 (26.8)	−0.4 (31.3)	0.5 (32.9)	5.6 (42.1)	10.0 (50.0)	11.7 (53.1)	14.3 (57.7)	13.7 (56.7)	9.8 (49.6)	4.2 (39.6)	1.0 (33.8)	−3.0 (26.6)	−3.0 (26.6)
Average precipitation mm (inches)	21.3 (0.84)	15.9 (0.63)	35.3 (1.39)	56.8 (2.24)	104.1 (4.10)	152.9 (6.02)	205.4 (8.09)	177.2 (6.98)	112.2 (4.42)	62.5 (2.46)	36.8 (1.45)	22.5 (0.89)	1,002.9 (39.51)
Average precipitation days (≥ 0.1 mm)	6.0	5.7	6.8	9.9	14.0	17.7	20.2	20.3	13.3	11.2	6.9	4.9	136.9
Average snowy days	0.4	0.1	0.1	0	0	0	0	0	0	0	0	0.1	0.7
Average relative humidity (%)	77	73	70	68	71	77	81	81	79	79	77	77	76
Mean monthly sunshine hours	160.0	174.7	206.2	221.1	209.7	161.6	150.2	156.3	153.9	139.9	169.2	157.7	2,060.5
Percentage possible sunshine	47	54	55	58	51	40	36	39	42	39	52	48	47
Source 1: China Meteorological Administrationall-time October record
Source 2: Weather China

== Transport ==
- Wenshan Yanshan Airport
