= Wenshan Zhuang and Miao Autonomous Prefecture =

Wenshan Prefecture 文山州 (Chinese) Vwnzsanh Couh (Zhuang) Wenx Shangb Zheub (Hmong)
- Autonomous prefecture
- Wenshan Zhuang and Miao Autonomous Prefecture 文山壮族苗族自治州; Vwnzsanh Bouxcuengh Myauzcuz Swcicouh; Wenx Shangb Langs Hmongb Zif Zhif Zheub
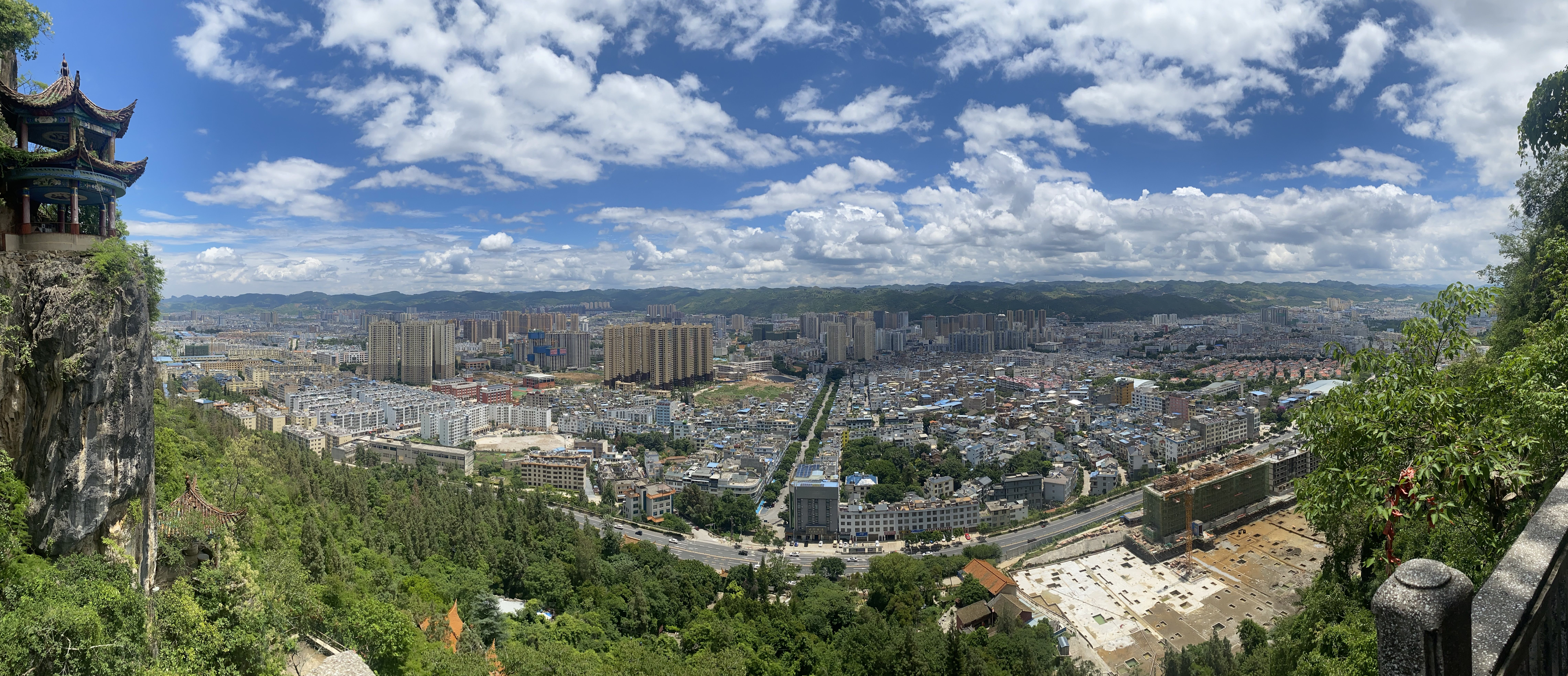
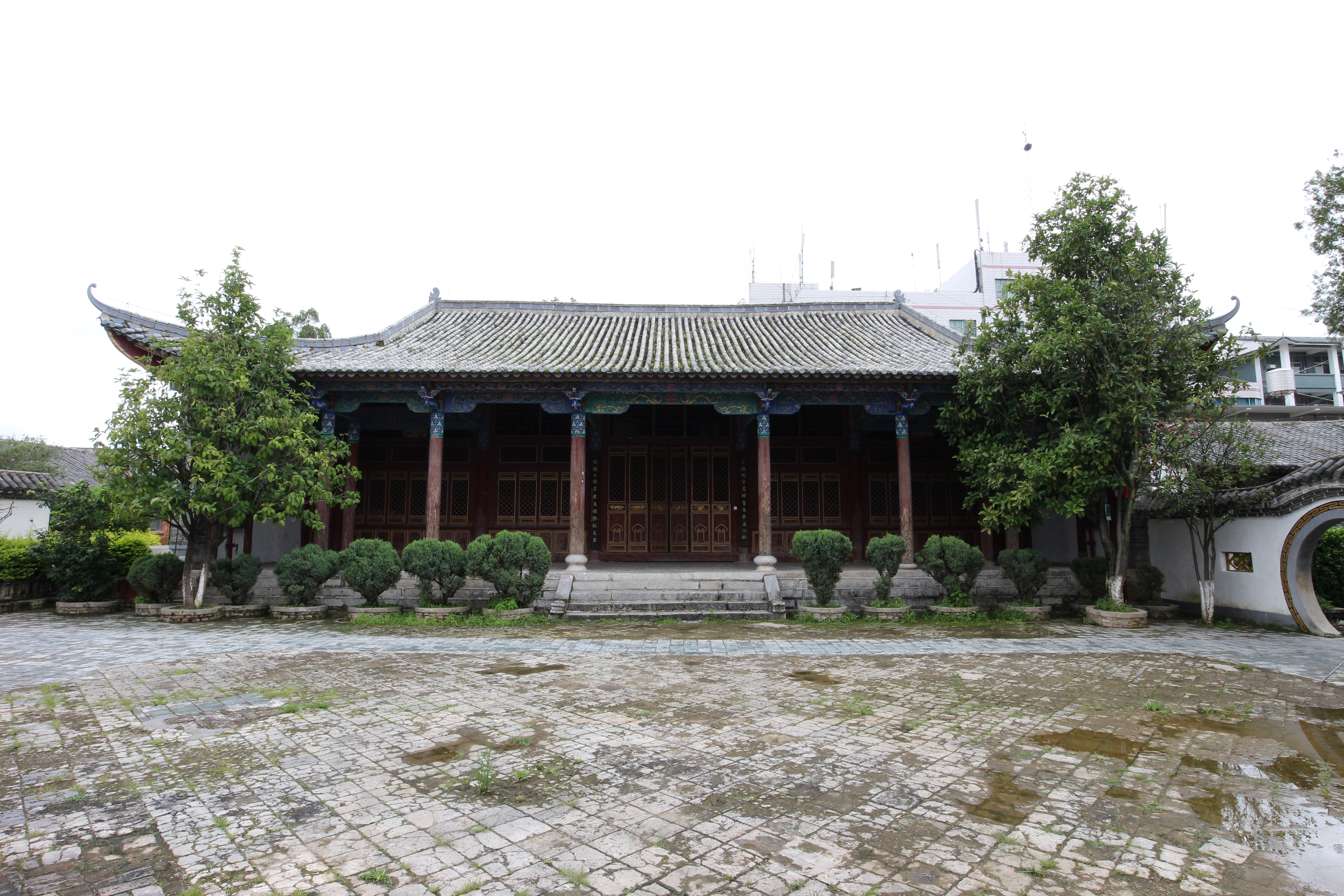
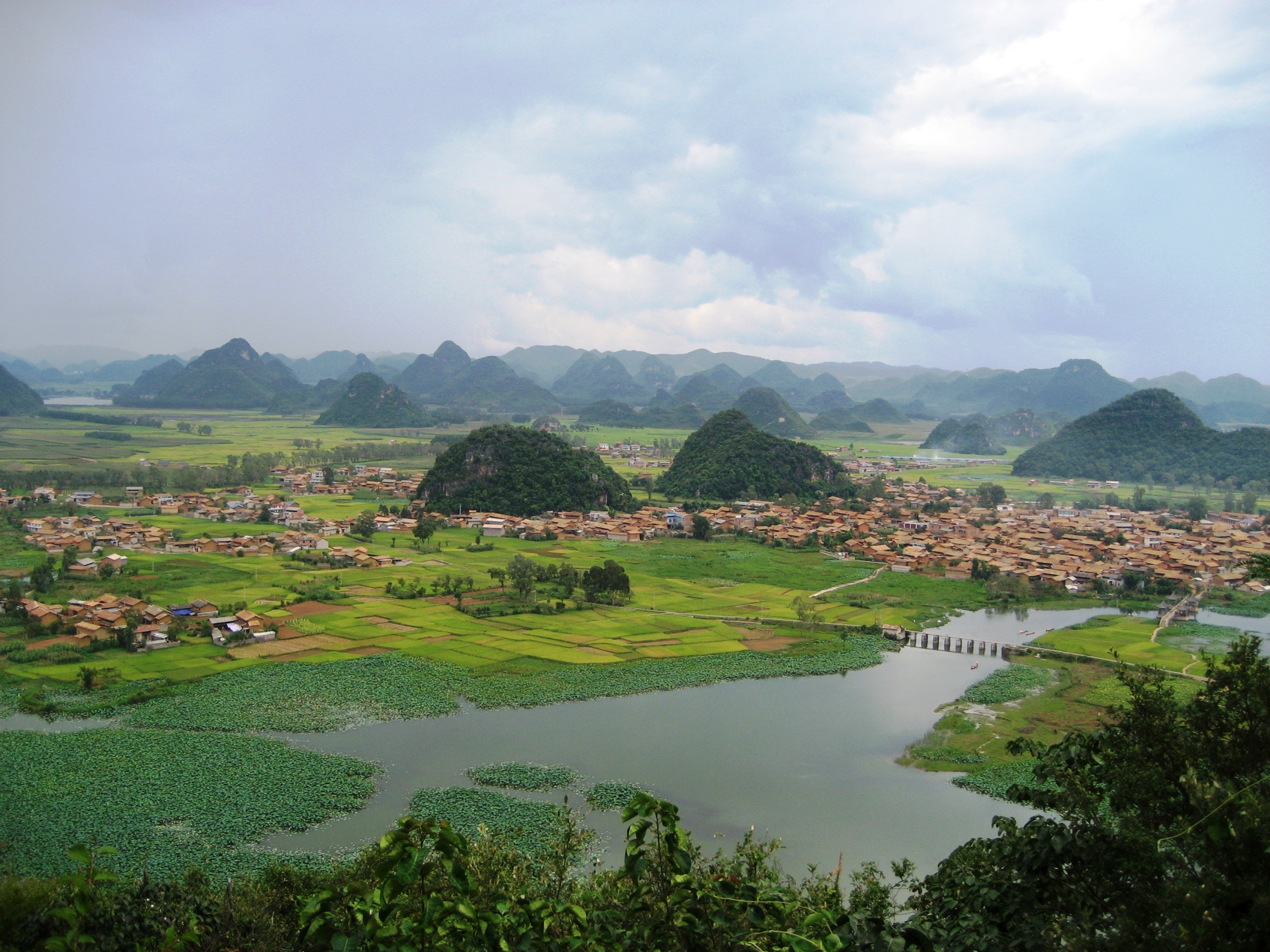
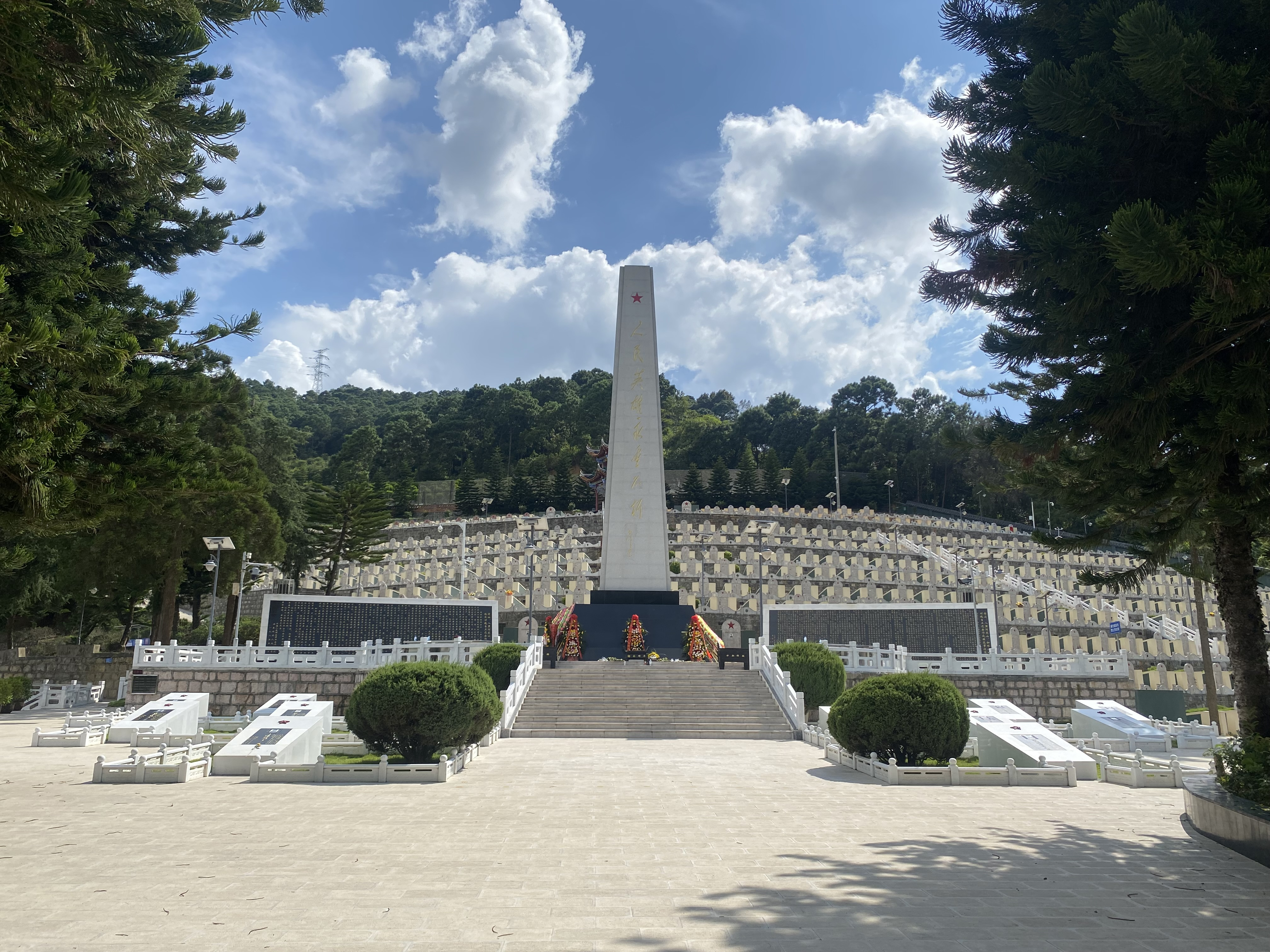
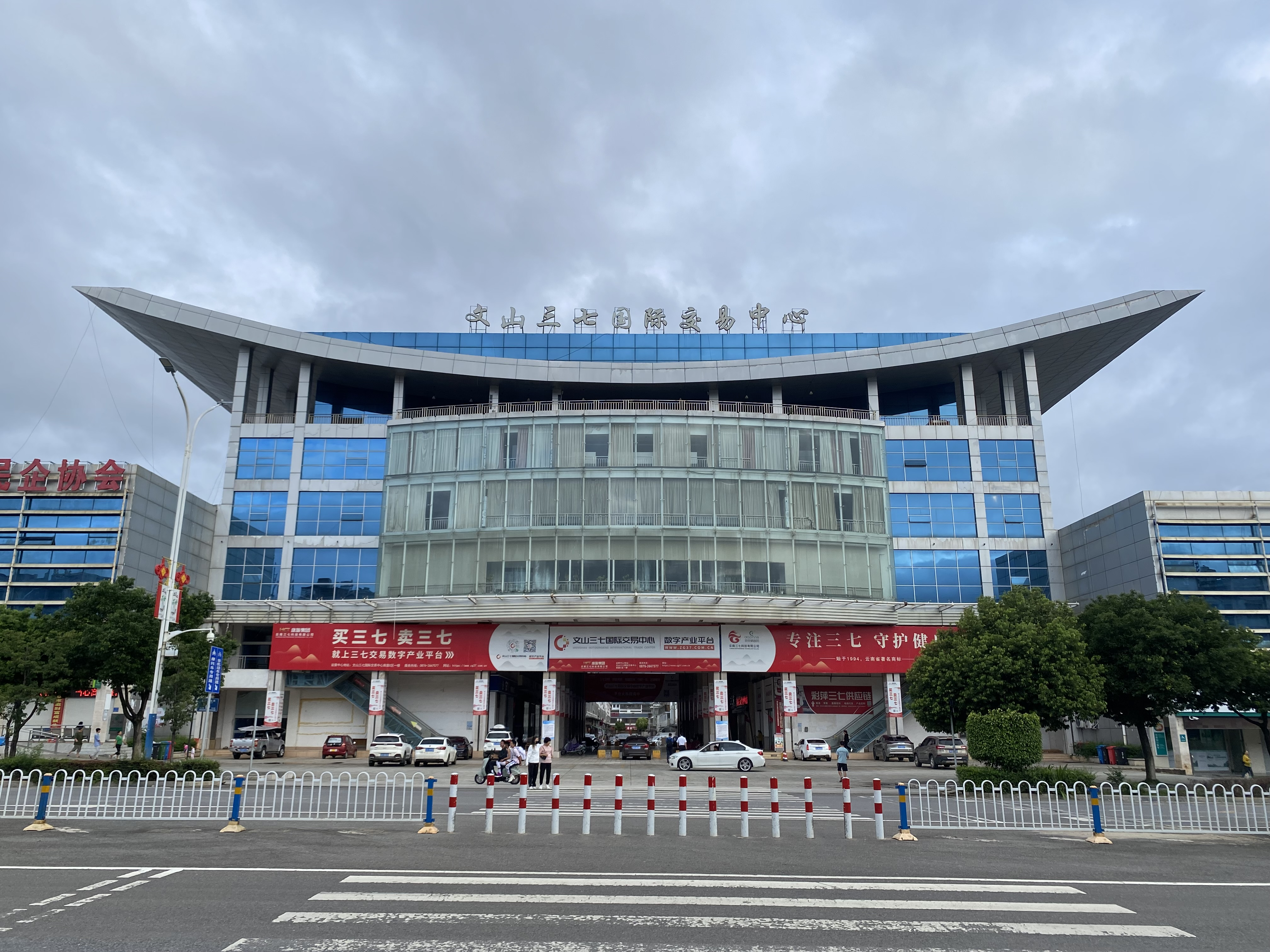
- Urban skyline of capital Wenshan City Nong's Tusi Chiefdom Office Puzhehei Lake Malipo Martyrs Cemetery Wenshan Notoginseng International Trading Center

- Location of Honghe Prefecture in Yunnan
- Coordinates (Wenshan Prefecture government): 23.40°N 104.22°E
- Country: China
- Province: Yunnan
- GB/T 2260 CODE: 532600
- Admin HQ: Wenshan
- Admin units: List: Wenshan; Yanshan; Xichou; Malipo; Maguan; Qiubei; Guangnan; Funing

Area
  - Total: 31,409.12 km^{2} (12,127.13 sq mi)
- Elevation: 1,263 m (4,144 ft)

Population (2010)
  - Total: 3,517,946
  - Density: 112.0040/km^{2} (290.0889/sq mi)

GDP
  - Total: CN¥ 140.5 billion US$ 20.7 billion
  - Per capita: CN¥ 40,748; US$ 6,010
- Time zone: UTC+8 (China Standard)
- Postal code: 663000
- Area code: 0876
- ISO 3166 code: CN-YN-26
- Licence plate prefixes: 云H
- Website: www.ynws.gov.cn
- ^{1}Yunnan Statistics Bureau^{2}Yunnan Portal

Wenshan Zhuang and Miao Autonomous Prefecture

Chinese name
- Simplified Chinese: 文山壮族苗族自治州
- Traditional Chinese: 文山壯族苗族自治州
Transcriptions
Standard Mandarin
- Hanyu Pinyin: Wénshān Zhuàngzú Miáozú Zìzhìzhōu

Zhuang name
- Zhuang: Vwnzsanh Bouxcuengh Myauzcuz Swcicouh

Dananshan Miao name
- Dananshan Miao: Wenx Shangb Langs Hmongb Zif Zhif Zheub

Wenshan Zhuang and Miao Autonomous Prefecture is an autonomous prefecture in southeastern Yunnan Province, People's Republic of China, and is the easternmost prefecture-level division of the province. It borders Baise, Guangxi, to the east, Vietnam's Tuyên Quang Province to the south for 438 kilometres (272 mi), Honghe Hani and Yi Autonomous Prefecture to the west, and Qujing to the north.

== Subdivisions ==
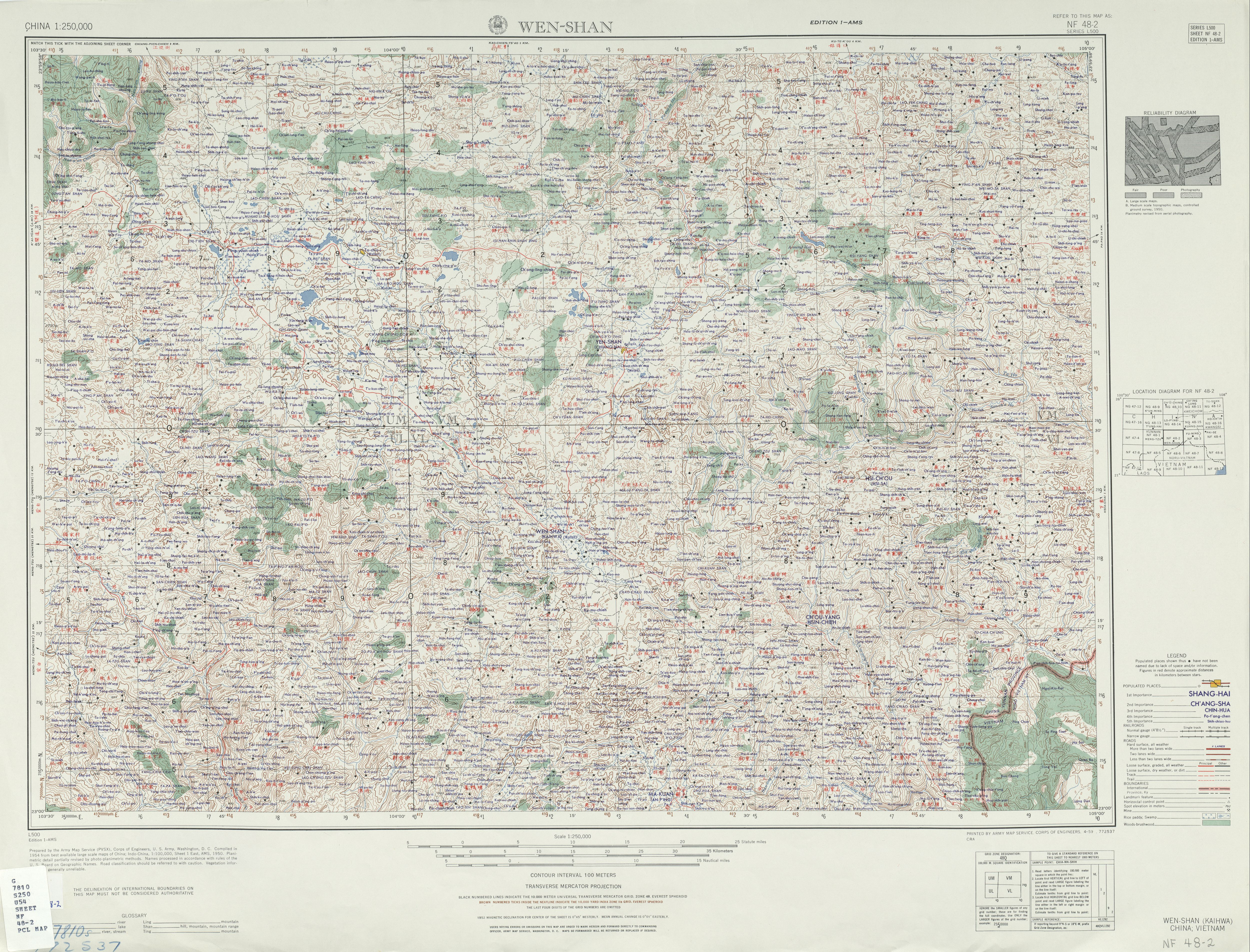
Map including Wenshan (labeled as WEN-SHAN (KAIHWA) (Walled) 文山) (AMS, 1954)

Map
Name	Hanzi	Hanyu Pinyin	Population (2010)	Area (km^{2})	Density(/km^{2})
Wenshan City	文山市	Wénshān Shì	481,504	3,064	157
Yanshan County	砚山县	Yànshān Xiàn	463,264	3,888	119
Xichou County	西畴县	Xīchóu Xiàn	255,286	1,545	165
Malipo County	麻栗坡县	Málìpō Xiàn	277,960	2,395	116
Maguan County	马关县	Mǎguān Xiàn	367,507	2,755	133
Qiubei County	丘北县	Qiūběi Xiàn	477,441	5,150	93
Guangnan County	广南县	Guǎngnán Xiàn	787,449	7,983	99
Funing County	富宁县	Fùníng Xiàn	407,530	5,459	75

== Ethnic groups ==
Wenshan is highly diverse. According to a local saying, "Han and Hui live by the market, Zhuang and Dai live by the water, Miao and Yi live on the mountains, and Yao live among the valleys." (汉族、回族住街头，壮族、傣族住水头，苗族、彝族住山头，瑶族住箐头。)

Some of Wenshan's ethnic groups include:

- Han Chinese
- Tai peoples
  - Zhuang (3 branches according to Kaup (2000); 4 branches according to Johnson (2011))
    - Nong
    - Sha 沙 ("Yei Zhuang")
    - Tu 土 ("Dai Zhuang")
    - Min
  - Dai
    - Tai Hongjin - Maguan County
- Kra peoples
  - Buyang - Funing County, Guangnan County
  - Lachi - Maguan County
  - Gelao - Malipo County
  - Qabiao - Malipo County
- Miao–Yao peoples
  - Miao people (listed from east to west)
    - Lopsided Miao (偏苗 Shuat)
    - White Miao (白苗 Dleub)
    - Green Miao (青苗 Shib, Nzhuab)
    - Flowery Miao (花苗 Soud, Bes, Buak)
  - Yao people
- Tibeto-Burman peoples
  - Yi people - Funing County, Guangnan County, Malipo County
  - Bai people - Qiubei County (in Mazhelong 马者龙, etc.), Yanshan County (in Jiayi 稼依镇), Guangnan County (in Zhulin 珠琳镇)
- Mon-Khmer peoples
  - Bolyu - Guangnan County
  - Bugan - Guangnan County, Xichou County

Yunnan (1979) lists Jiazhou 甲州 (pop. 475), Longjiang 龙降 (pop. 54), Tusi 土司 (pop. 134), and Bendi 本地 (pop. 7) as Zhuang subgroups of unknown linguistic affiliation.

=== Yi ===
The Wenshan Prefecture Gazetteer (文山壮族苗族自治州志) (2000) and the Wenshan Prefecture Ethnic Gazetteer (文山壮族苗族自治州志) (2005) list the following Yi ethnic subdivisions in Wenshan Prefecture.

- Luo (倮)
  - White Lolo (白倮倮) (autonyms: Suodu 所都, Luoluobu 罗罗布, Xiqima 洗其麻, Gaisipo 改斯泼)
    - Mokong (莫空) (Gaokujiao Luo 高裤脚倮) of Funing and Guangnan counties
    - Mudai (木歹) of Funing and Napo counties
  - Black Lolo (黑倮倮) (autonyms: Nuosupo 诺苏泼, Luoluopo 罗罗泼): in Qiubei, Yanshan, and Wenshan counties
  - Flowery Lolo (花倮倮) (autonyms: Hanluowu 含罗武, Luwu 鲁屋, Niesu 聂素): in Funing, Guangnan, Malipo, Xichou, Maguan, and Yanshan counties
- Pu (仆)
  - Black Phula (黑仆拉) (autonym: Azha 阿扎)
  - White Phula (白仆拉) (autonym: Zuoke 作科)
  - Flowery Phula (花仆拉) (autonym: Abo 阿僰)
- Sani (撒尼) (autonym: Sanipo 撒尼泼): in Qiubei County
- Awu (阿武) (autonym: Awu 阿武; exonyms: Mengwu 孟武, Awu 阿吾, Mengwu 孟乌, Mengzu 孟族)
  - Lai (俫) (autonym; a branch of the Awu 阿武, also called Mengwu 孟武): in Xisa 西洒镇, Xichou; Daping 大坪镇 and Nanwenhe 南温河乡 of Malipo
- Gepu (格仆) (autonyms: Gepo 葛泼, Alingpo 阿灵泼; exonyms: Geluoluo/duo 葛倮罗/多, Adu 阿度, Aga 阿嘎): in Tiechang 铁厂乡 and Donggan 董干镇 townships of Malipo County
- Axi (阿西): in Wenshan, Yanshan, and Qiubei counties
- Lalu (腊鲁) (Lalupu 腊鲁仆; exonym: Xiangtang 香堂): in Nanping 南屏镇

=== Yao ===
The Wenshan Prefecture Gazetteer (文山壮族苗族自治州志) (2000) lists the following Yao ethnic subdivisions in Wenshan Prefecture.

- Men (们) or Jinmen (金门) (exonym: Landian Yao 蓝靛瑶)
- Mengmian (孟棉) or Youmian (尤勉) (exonyms: Daban Yao 大板瑶, Jiao Yao 角瑶)
- Xiu (秀) or Ya (亚) (exonyms: Shan Yao 山瑶, Guoshan Yao 过山瑶): in Longmen (龙门) and Longshao (龙绍) of Funing County, and in Tiechang (铁厂), Jinchang (金厂), and other locations of Malipo County

== Demographics ==
Among the resident population, the Han population is 1,501,848, accounting for 42.69% of the total population; the ethnic minorities population is 2,016,098, accounting for 57.31% of the total population.By the end of 2024, the resident population of the whole state was 3.372 million.

Ethnic Composition of Wenshan Zhuang and Miao Autonomous Prefecture (November 2010)
National name	Han	Zhuang	Hmong	Yi	Yao	Hui	Dai	Bai	Buyi	Mongol	Others	Total
Population	1501848	1027282	481239	351597	87709	24774	15776	9130	7257	5655	5679	3517946
Proportion of total population (%)	42.69	29.20	13.68	9.99	2.49	0.70	0.45	0.26	0.21	0.16	0.16	100
Proportion of minority population (%)	---	50.95	23.87	17.44	4.35	1.23	0.78	0.45	0.36	0.28	0.28	---

=== Gelao ===
The Wenshan Prefecture Gazetteer 文山壮族苗族自治州志 (2000) lists the following Gelao ethnic subdivisions in Wenshan Prefecture. The Gelao of Wenshan are also locally known as the Laobazi 老巴子 or Bazi 巴子.

- White Gelao (白仡佬)
- Green Gelao (青仡佬)
- Red Gelao (红仡佬)
- Flowery Gelao (花仡佬) (also known as the Wai Gelao (歪仡佬) or Pipao Gelao (披袍仡佬))

== History ==
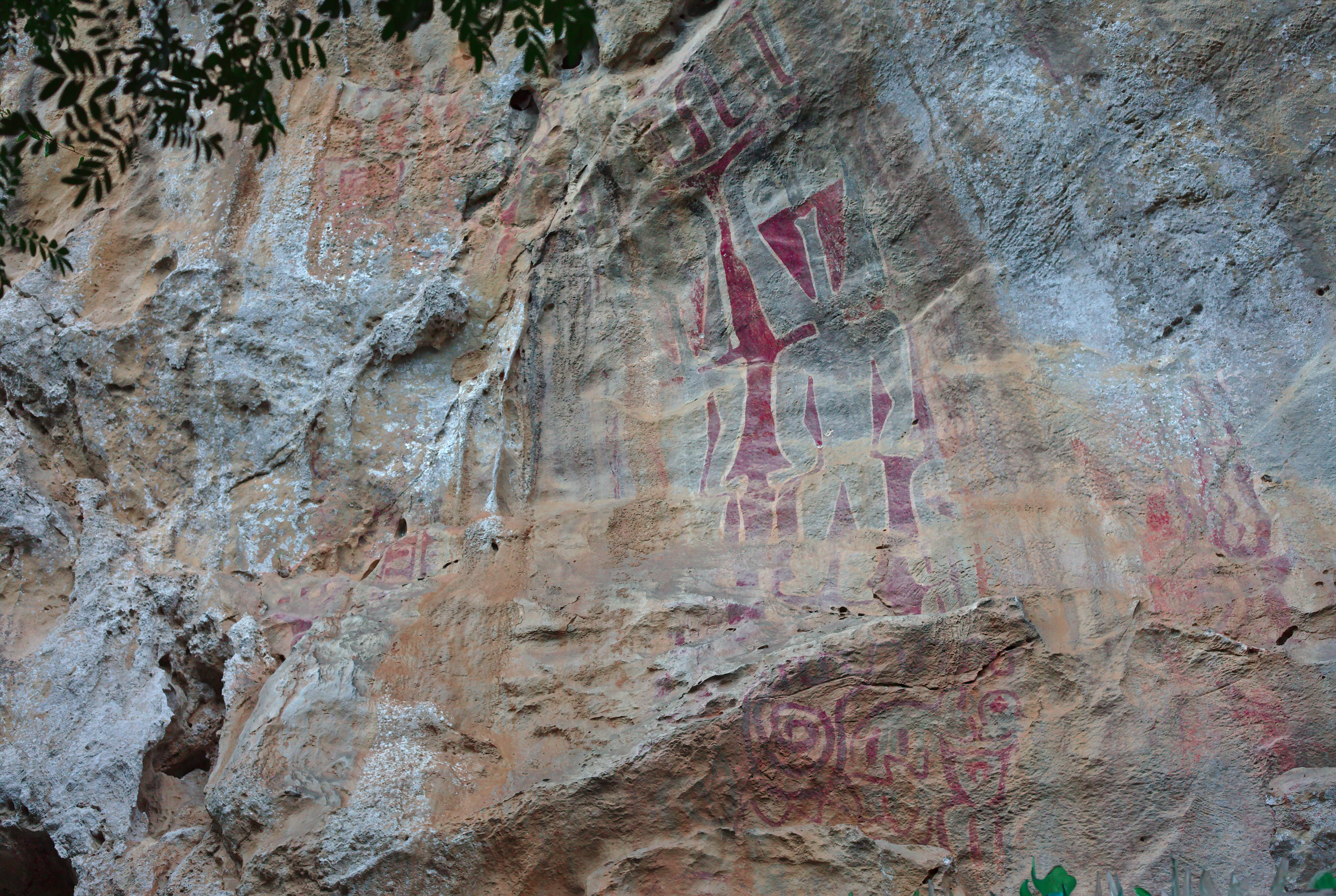
Neolithic painting at the 'Great King' painting site above Malipo.

The prefecture has been inhabited for at least 4000 years, as evidenced by surviving neolithic rock art in Malipo County. The Yelang kingdom existed in the area during the 3rd century BC.

The seat of Guangnan, known today as Liancheng (莲城镇), was the heart of the Gouding Kingdom (句町) that lasted approximately 400 years, from 111 BC to 316 AD.

== Transportation ==
- Wenshan Airport
