= Qabiao =

Qabiao can refer to:

- Qabiao language
- Qabiao people
