= Qabiao people =

Ethnic group in China and Vietnam

Qabiao
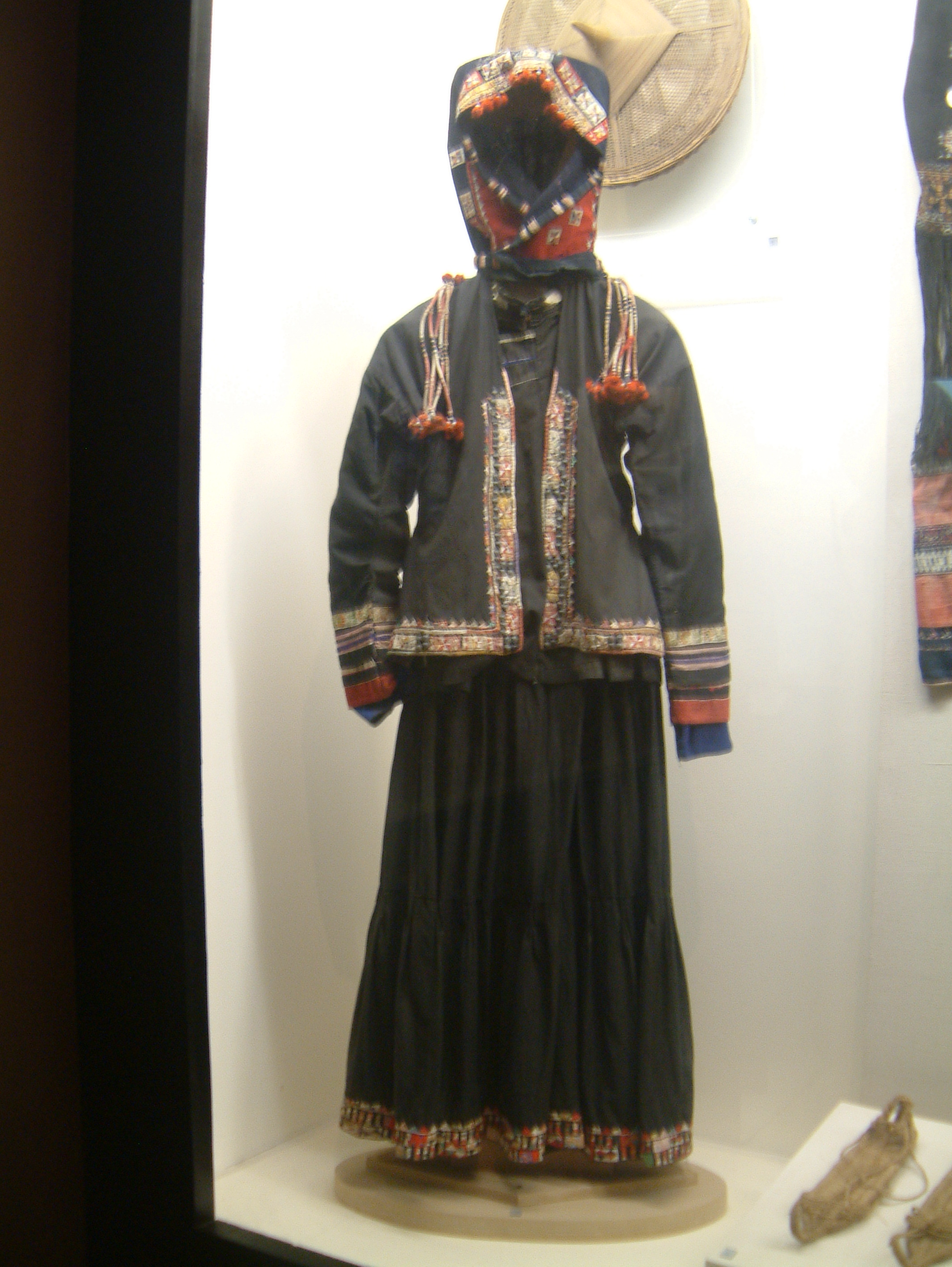

Total population
- 705 (1999 est.)

Regions with significant populations
- Vietnam: Hà Giang 903 (2019); China: Wenshan

Languages
- Qabiao • Vietnamese • Chinese

Religion
- Animism

The Qabiao or Pu Peo people (Vietnamese: Pu Péo) are an ethnic group living in Hà Giang Province, Vietnam and Malipo County of Yunnan province, China. The total population was 903 as of the 2019 census, while Liang (2007) cites a total population of 777. In China, they are classified with the Yi people. Their autonym is qa˧ biau˧. The Chinese also refer to the Qabiao as 'Bendi Lolo', which translates as 'indigenous Lolo'.

== History ==
Historically, the Qabiao have inhabited either side of the China-Vietnam border, although nowhere were they existing in large numbers. One survey conducted in 1990 showed that there were 307 Qabiao living in southern China, whereas 382 dwelt in northern Vietnam. In China, the Qabiao are concentrated near the Vietnam border, namely in the Tiechang, Matong, Punong, Pucha, and Pufeng villages of Malipo County in the Wenshan Zhuang-Miao Prefecture of Yunnan province. The Qabiao live in seven communes of Đồng Văn District in Hà Giang Province in Vietnam.

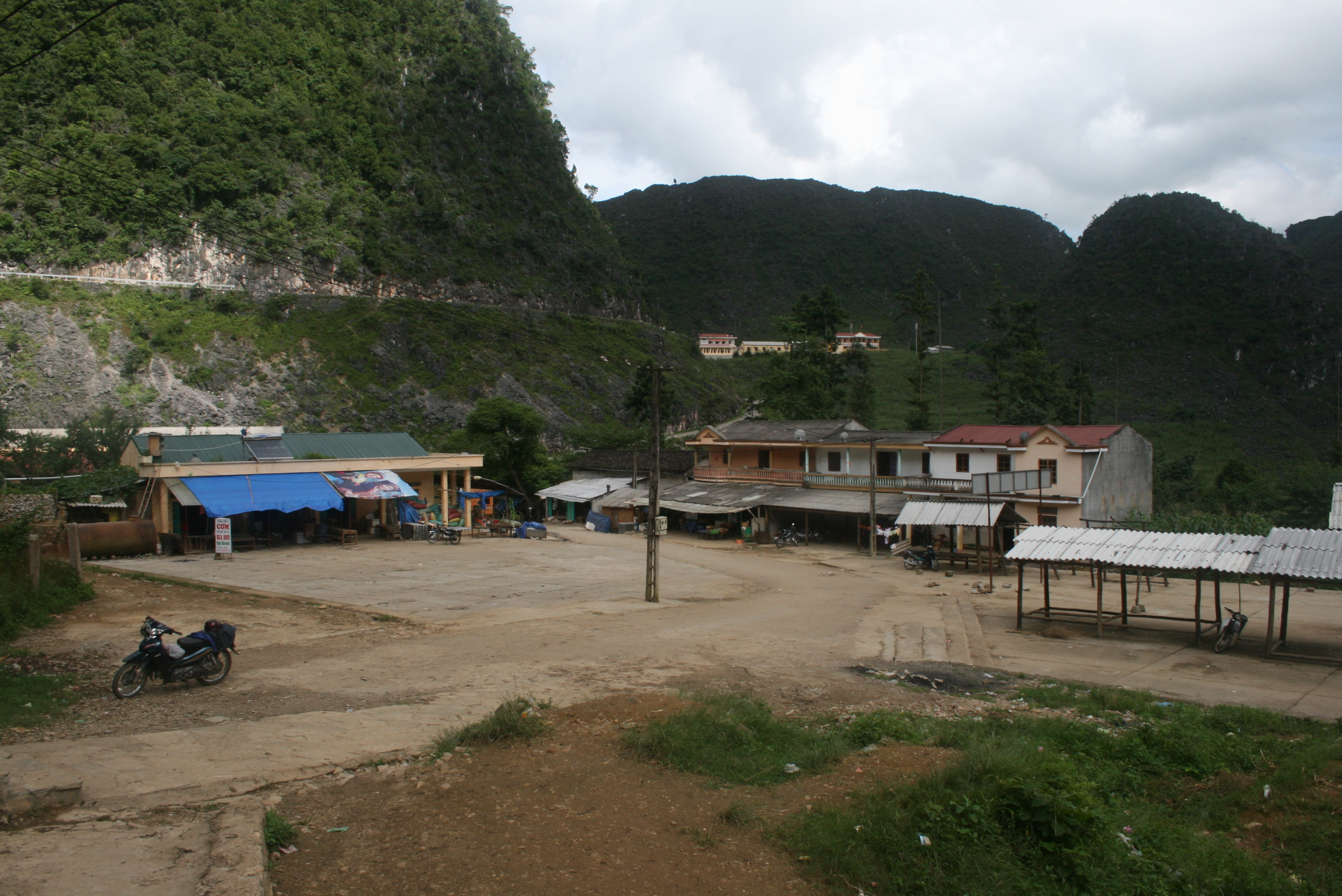
A village in Đồng Văn District, Vietnam.

== Culture and traditions ==
The Qabiao women's traditional attire consisted of an ankle length skirt. For the upper body the women usually wore two vests. Now, there is an increasingly popular custom of wearing only the inner vest. Bok tam, as the inner vest is known, consists of five panels and has buttons under the right armpit. Bands of colored cloth are sewn around the hems, neck and sleeves of the dress, which resemble the embellishments found in the costumes of the Giay.

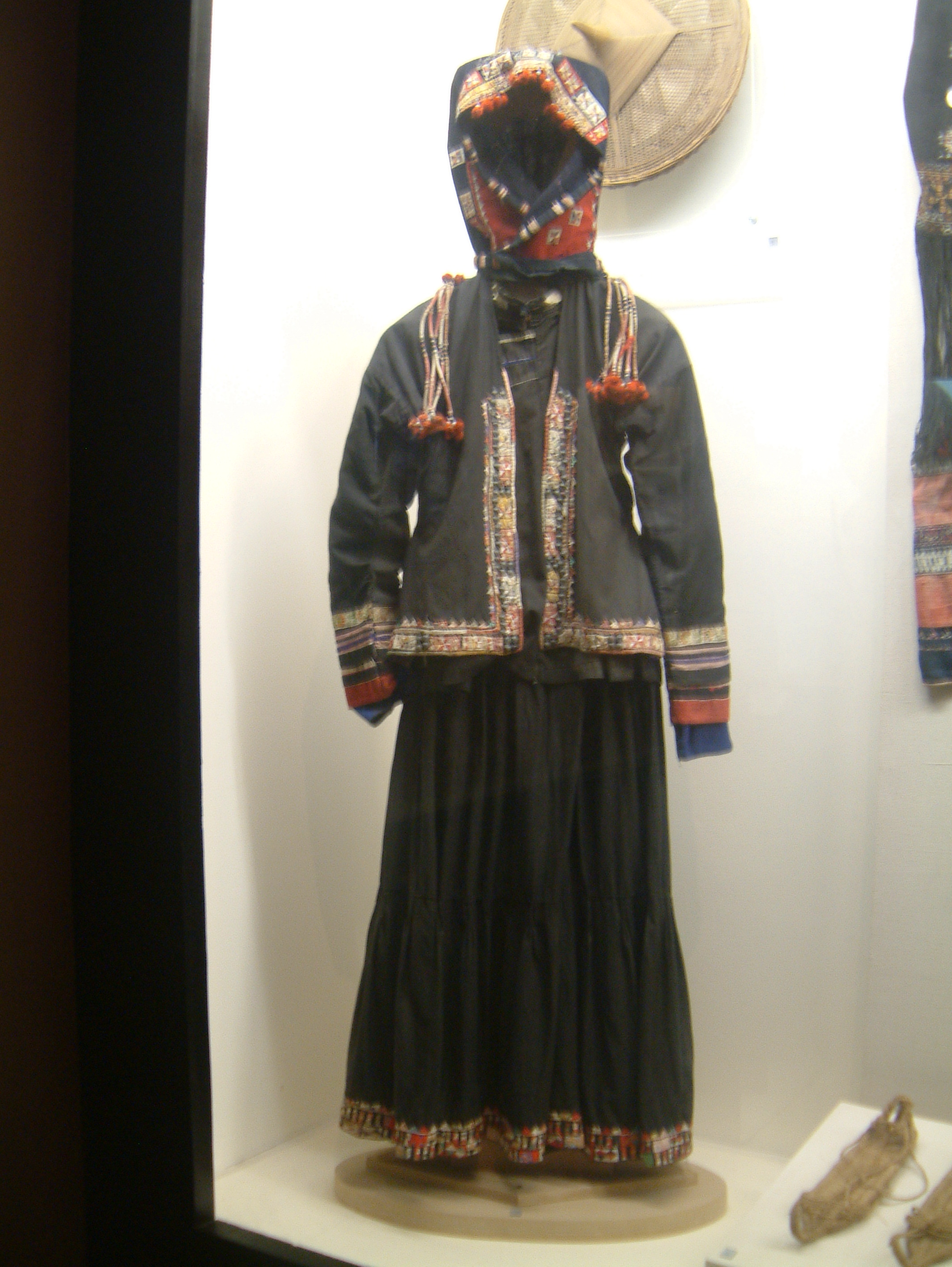
Traditional dress of the Qabiao

=== Language ===
They speak Qabiao language, also called Pu Péo, is part of the Kra language family. It's spoken in China(Malipo County) and Vietnam(Hà Giang Province) . The language is at risk of disappearing because fewer people are speaking it, and it is mostly used at home or in small villages. There are no written records of the language, making it harder to keep it alive. Efforts are being made to document and preserve the language.

== Religion ==
The Qabiao practice animism. Souls and spirits are cornerstones of their belief system. The Qabiao believe a person has eight souls and nine spirits, all of which control his or her actions and existence. Most Qabiao homes have a small altar at which are seen three sandstone jars. Each jar represents a generation of ancestors. Other paraphernalia include dried pumpkin and a bundle of oxtail hair attached to a stick. These items are said to be the deceased ancestors' clue to identifying their descendants.

The Qabiao have an oath of preserving the sacred forest.

== Mythology ==
The Qabiao people have the following pantheon:

- te˧ sau˧ ʑa˥ sau˧: principal god
- sau˧ mun˧: sky god – controls the wind, rain, thunder, lightning
- sau˧ muŋ˥: land god – controls rivers and mountains
- sau˧ te˥: tree god

== See also ==
- Qabiao language
