= Xichou County =

Xichou County 西畴县 · Sihcouz Yen
- County
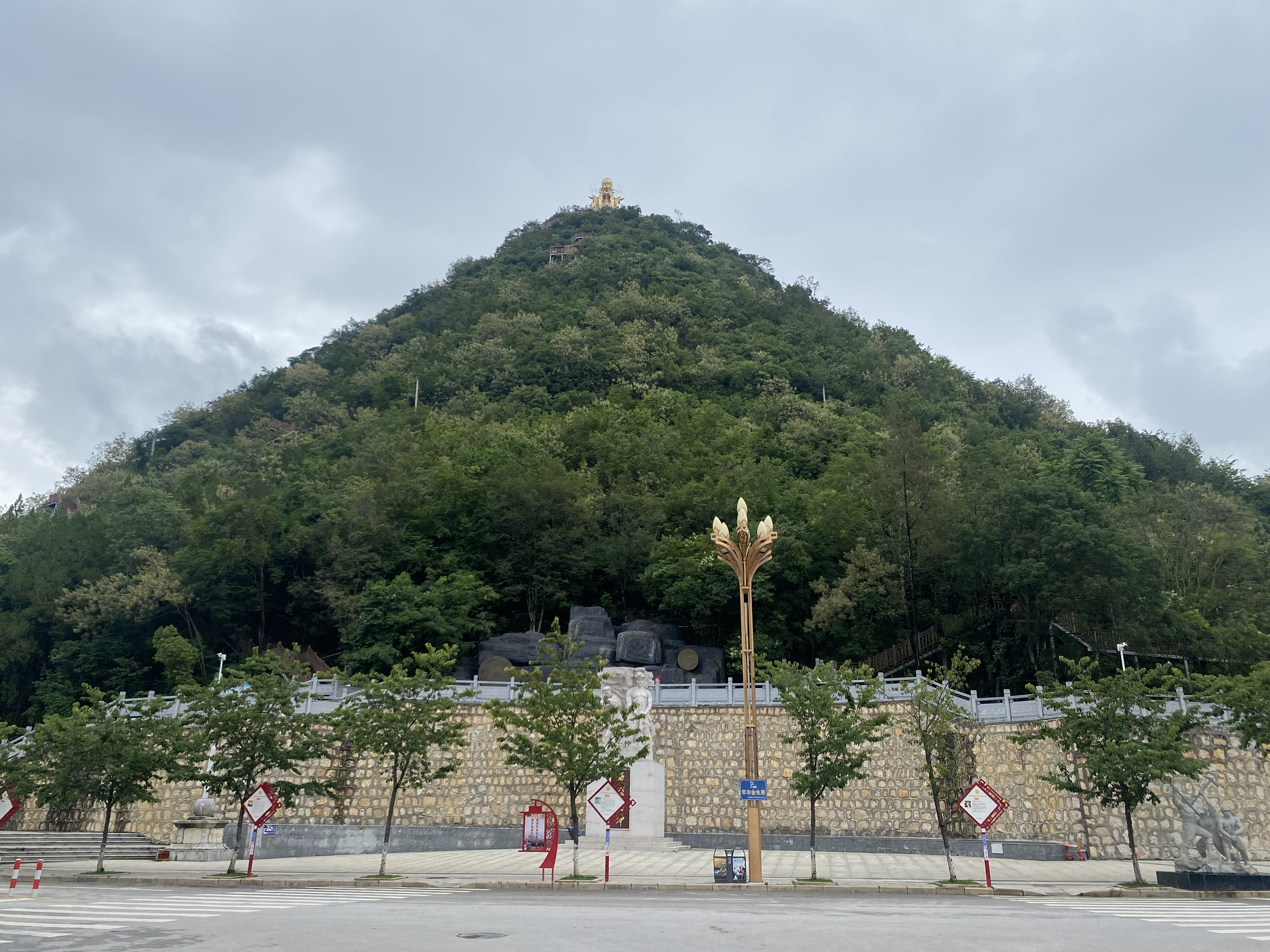
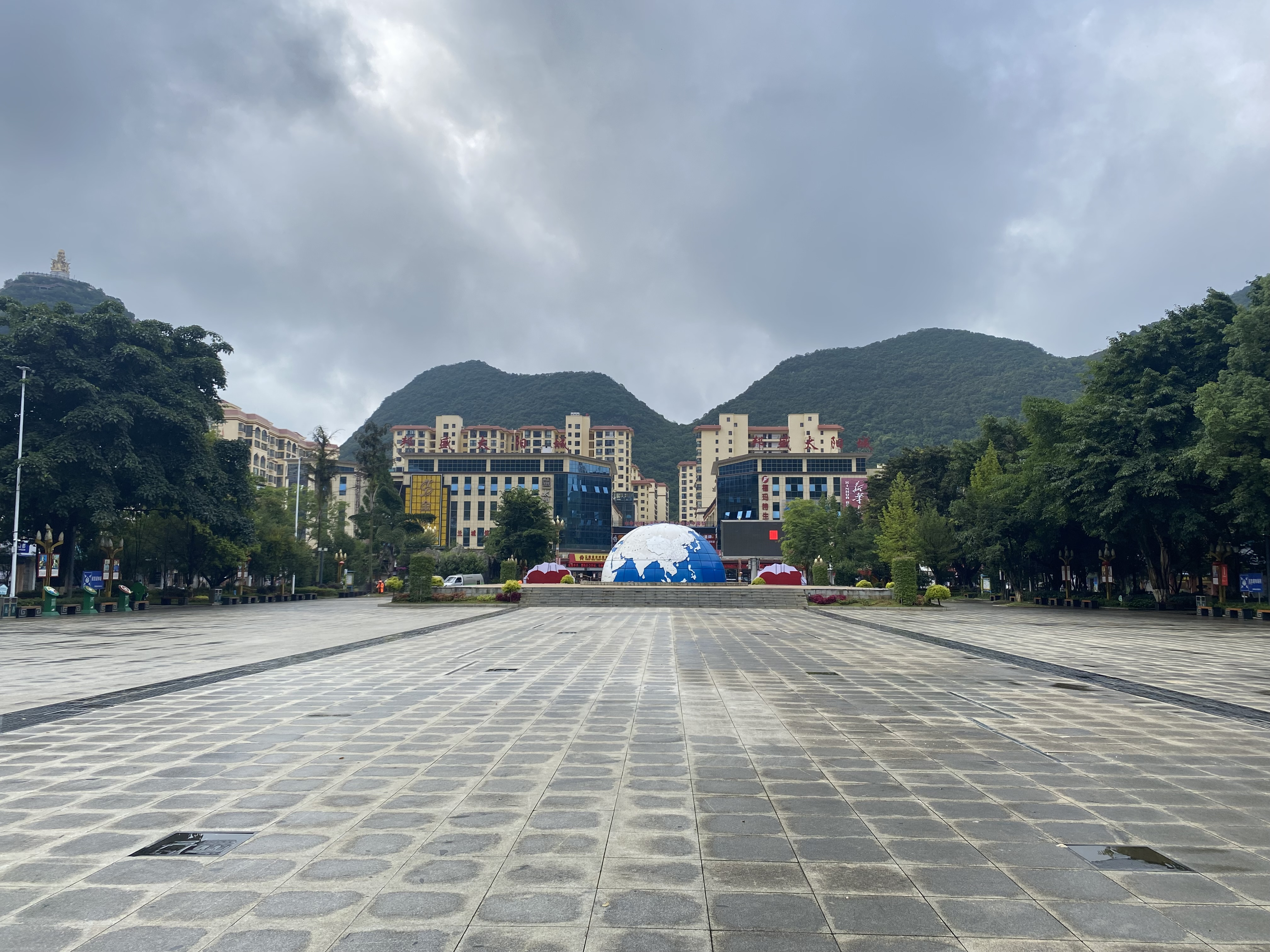
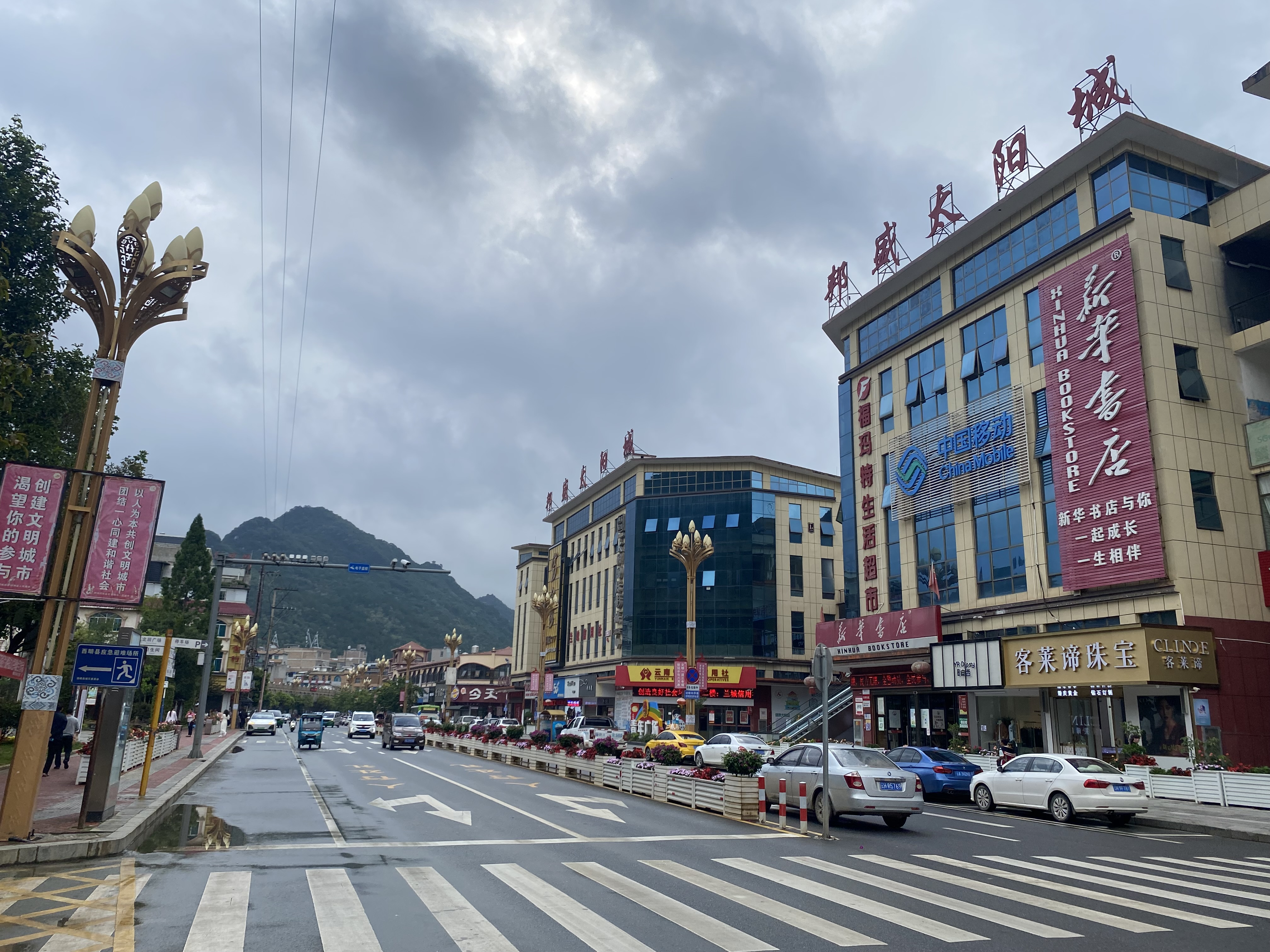
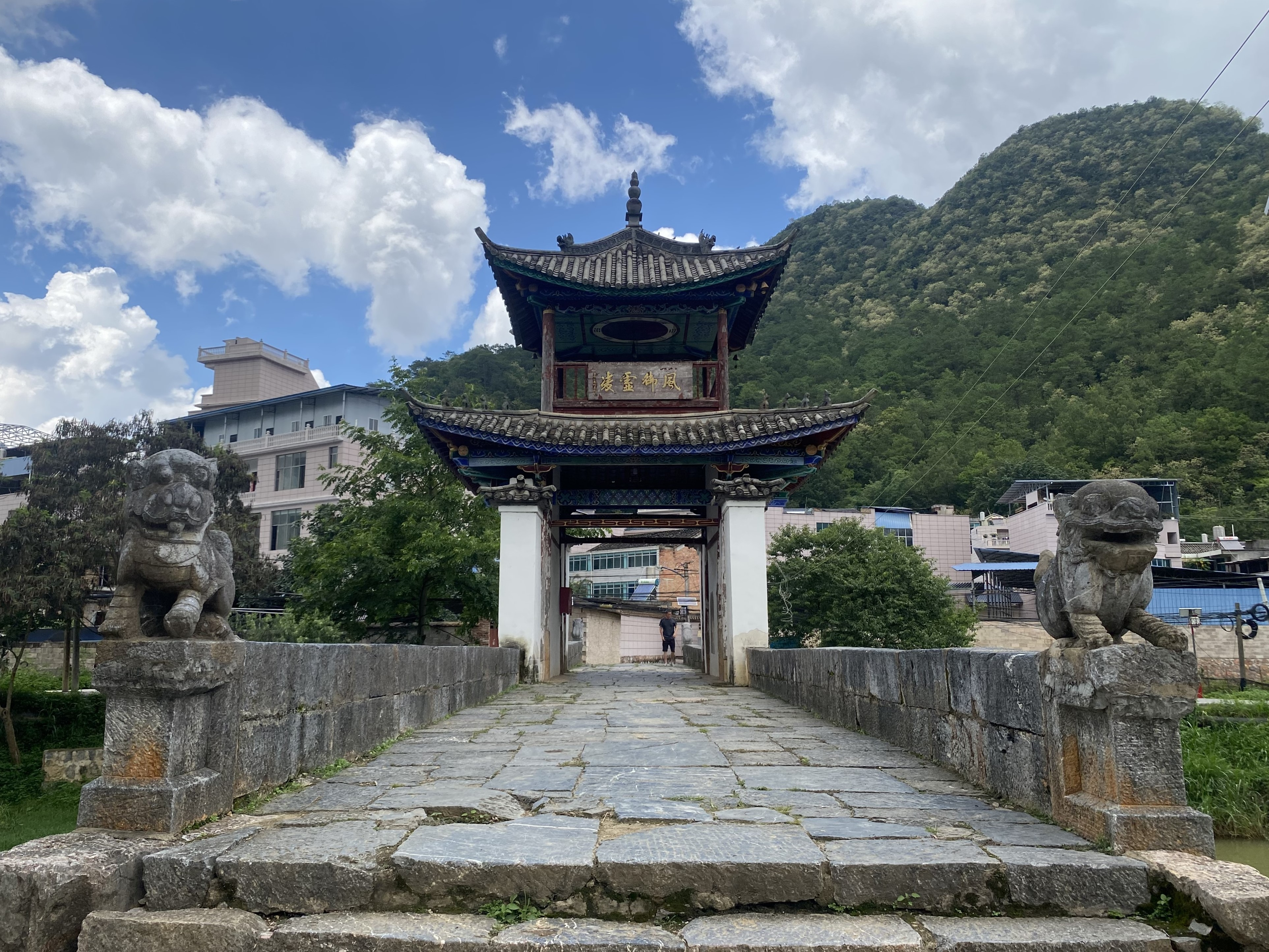
- Cityscape of county town Jinzhong Mountain Northern Tropic Square Jinyu Avenue Baoxing Bridge

- Location of Xichou County (red) and Wenshan Prefecture (pink) within Yunnan province of China

- Location within Yunnan
- Coordinates: 23°26′12″N 104°40′34″E
- Country: China
- Province: Yunnan
- Autonomous prefecture: Wenshan
- County seat: Xisa

Area
  - Total: 1,545 km^{2} (597 sq mi)

Population (2020 census)
  - Total: 203,630
  - Density: 131.8/km^{2} (341.4/sq mi)
- Time zone: UTC+8 (CST)
- Postal code: 663500
- Area code: 0876
- Website: www.xczw.gov.cn

Xichou County (simplified Chinese: 西畴县; traditional Chinese: 西疇縣; pinyin: Xīchóu Xiàn) is under the administration of the Wenshan Zhuang and Miao Autonomous Prefecture, in the southeast of Yunnan province, China.

== Administrative divisions ==
In the present, Xichou County has 2 towns and 7 townships.

2 towns

- Xisa (西洒镇)
- Xingjie (兴街镇)

7 townships

- Banggu (蚌谷乡)
- Lianhuatang (莲花塘乡)
- Xinmajie (新马街乡)
- Bolin (柏林乡)
- Fadou (法斗乡)
- Dongma (董马乡)
- Jijie (鸡街乡)

== Ethnic groups ==
The Xichou County Gazetteer (西畴县志) of 1996 lists the following ethnic subgroups.

- Han
- Zhuang
- Miao
- Yao
- Yi
  - Luoluo 倮倮
    - Flowery Luo 花倮
    - White Luo 白倮
    - Black Luo 黑倮
    - Chinese Luo 汉倮
  - Pula 朴喇
  - Mengwu 孟乌
- Mongol

== Transport ==
- Nearest airport: Wenshan Airport

== Climate ==
Climate data for Xichou, elevation 1,508 m (4,948 ft), (1991–2020 normals, extremes 1981–2010)
Month	Jan	Feb	Mar	Apr	May	Jun	Jul	Aug	Sep	Oct	Nov	Dec	Year
Record high °C (°F)	24.8 (76.6)	28.3 (82.9)	30.7 (87.3)	32.7 (90.9)	34.8 (94.6)	31.4 (88.5)	30.4 (86.7)	31.0 (87.8)	30.8 (87.4)	28.6 (83.5)	27.1 (80.8)	25.4 (77.7)	34.8 (94.6)
Mean daily maximum °C (°F)	13.5 (56.3)	16.7 (62.1)	20.3 (68.5)	23.5 (74.3)	25.5 (77.9)	25.8 (78.4)	25.7 (78.3)	25.7 (78.3)	24.3 (75.7)	21.0 (69.8)	18.7 (65.7)	14.5 (58.1)	21.3 (70.3)
Daily mean °C (°F)	8.9 (48.0)	11.2 (52.2)	14.4 (57.9)	17.8 (64.0)	20.4 (68.7)	21.4 (70.5)	21.3 (70.3)	20.9 (69.6)	19.6 (67.3)	16.8 (62.2)	13.6 (56.5)	9.7 (49.5)	16.3 (61.4)
Mean daily minimum °C (°F)	6.1 (43.0)	7.9 (46.2)	10.9 (51.6)	14.2 (57.6)	17.0 (62.6)	18.7 (65.7)	18.7 (65.7)	18.0 (64.4)	16.7 (62.1)	14.3 (57.7)	10.4 (50.7)	6.8 (44.2)	13.3 (56.0)
Record low °C (°F)	−3.1 (26.4)	−2.0 (28.4)	−2.3 (27.9)	4.3 (39.7)	7.4 (45.3)	11.5 (52.7)	12.9 (55.2)	12.1 (53.8)	7.8 (46.0)	3.9 (39.0)	−1.5 (29.3)	−5.5 (22.1)	−5.5 (22.1)
Average precipitation mm (inches)	23.8 (0.94)	20.5 (0.81)	45.8 (1.80)	65.8 (2.59)	125.7 (4.95)	205.0 (8.07)	265.1 (10.44)	224.5 (8.84)	118.6 (4.67)	71.5 (2.81)	34.7 (1.37)	25.8 (1.02)	1,226.8 (48.31)
Average precipitation days (≥ 0.1 mm)	11.5	11.2	10.8	12.7	15.6	20.0	22.4	21.7	15.0	13.4	8.8	8.4	171.5
Average snowy days	0.7	0.2	0.1	0	0	0	0	0	0	0	0	0.2	1.2
Average relative humidity (%)	86	84	81	79	80	85	86	86	84	85	84	84	84
Mean monthly sunshine hours	103.9	118.0	152.6	171.6	168.3	128.3	127.5	135.5	130.1	101.7	125.8	112.0	1,575.3
Percentage possible sunshine	31	37	41	45	41	32	31	34	36	29	38	34	36
Source: China Meteorological Administration
