= Wenshan Yanshan Airport =

Wenshan Yanshan Airport 文山砚山机场
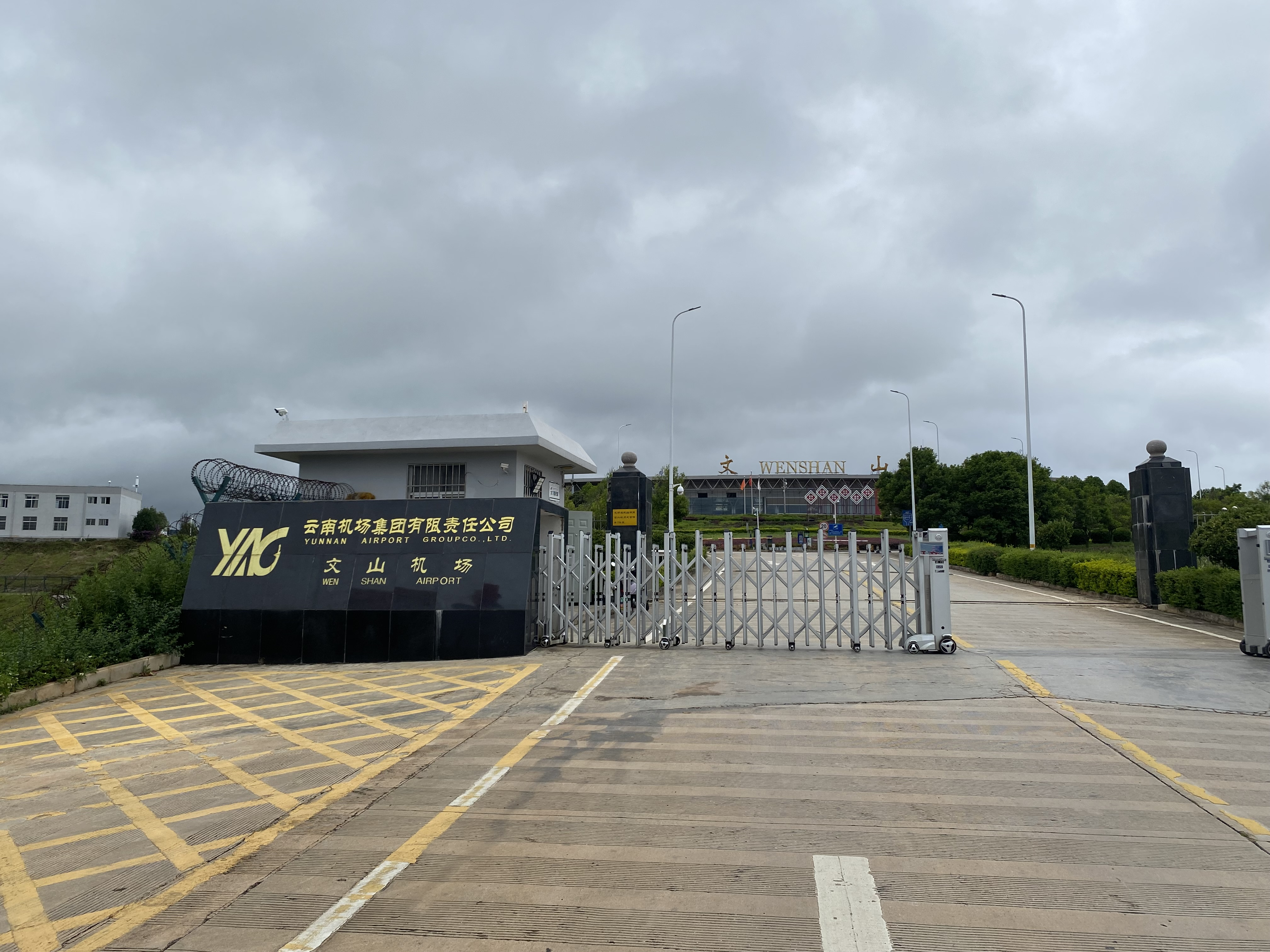
- IATA: WNH; ICAO: ZPWS

Summary
- Airport type: Public
- Serves: Wenshan, Yunnan, China
- Elevation AMSL: 1,590 m / 5,217 ft
- Coordinates: 23°33′49″N 104°20′1″E

Map
- Location of airport in Yunnan

Runways
Direction	Length		Surface
Direction	m	ft	Surface
02/20	2,400	7,874	Concrete

Statistics (2021)
- Passengers: 268,322
- Aircraft movements: 13,210
- Cargo (metric tons): 270.4
- Source: List of the busiest airports in the People's Republic of China

Wenshan Yanshan Airport
- Simplified Chinese: 文山砚山机场
- Traditional Chinese: 文山硯山機場
Transcriptions
Standard Mandarin
- Hanyu Pinyin: Wénshān Yànshān Jīchǎng

Wenshan Yanshan Airport (IATA: WNH, ICAO: ZPWS) is an airport serving Wenshan City in Yunnan Province, China. It is located 6 km from the center of Yanshan County and 25 km from Wenshan City.

== Airlines and destinations ==
Airlines	Destinations
China Southern Airlines	Beijing–Daxing, Guangzhou
Sichuan Airlines	Chengdu–Tianfu

== See also ==
- List of airports in the People's Republic of China
