= Caijia language =

Endangered Sino-Tibetan language of southwestern China

Caijia
- Menni
- men³¹ni³³, meŋ²¹ni³³ŋoŋ³³
- Pronunciation: [men˧˩ni˧], [meŋ˨˩ni˧ŋoŋ˧]
- Native to: China
- Region: Guizhou
- Native speakers: 1,000 (2004)
- Language family: Sino-Tibetan: Sinitic?; Macro-Bai?; Cai–Long; Caijia

Language codes
- ISO 639-3: None (mis)
- Glottolog: caij1234

Caijia (Chinese: 蔡家话) is an endangered Sino-Tibetan language spoken in an area centred on Bijie, in the west of the Chinese province of Guizhou. It was first documented by Chinese researchers in the 1980s. It has been described by different authors as a relative of Bai or an early split from Old Chinese. The autonym is men³¹ni³³. According to Lu (2022), Caijia speakers in Xingfa 兴发乡, Hezhang County refer to their language as meŋ²¹ni³³ŋoŋ³³.

== Classification ==
Similarities among Old Chinese, Waxiang, Caijia, and Bai have been pointed out by Wu & Shen (2010) and others. Zhengzhang Shangfang (2010) argued that Bai and Caijia formed a Macro-Bai subgroup of Sino-Tibetan.

Caijia also appears to be related to the extinct Longjia and Luren languages, but they are too poorly documented for definitive classification.

In contrast, Sagart (2011) groups Caijia with Waxiang, a divergent Chinese variety spoken in northwestern Hunan, as the earliest group to split off from Old Chinese. Sagart (2011) lists the following features of Old Chinese retained by both Caijia and Waxiang:

- OC *lˤ- and *lr- > Caijia and Waxiang l- (where Middle Chinese has d-), as in OC *lˤiŋ (田) > Caijia len31, Waxiang lɛ13 'field'
- OC *r- > Caijia ɣ- and Waxiang z- (where Middle Chinese has l-), as in OC *mə.rˤək (來) > *rˤə > Caijia ɣɯ31, Waxiang zɛ13 'to come'

Sagart identifies two words as shared innovations:

- 'two': Caijia ta55, Waxiang tso53, from OC *tsˤə(ʔ)-s 'twice' (再)
- 'milk': Caijia mi55, Waxiang mi55, which Sagart (2011) suggests is a non-Sinitic word

== Distribution ==
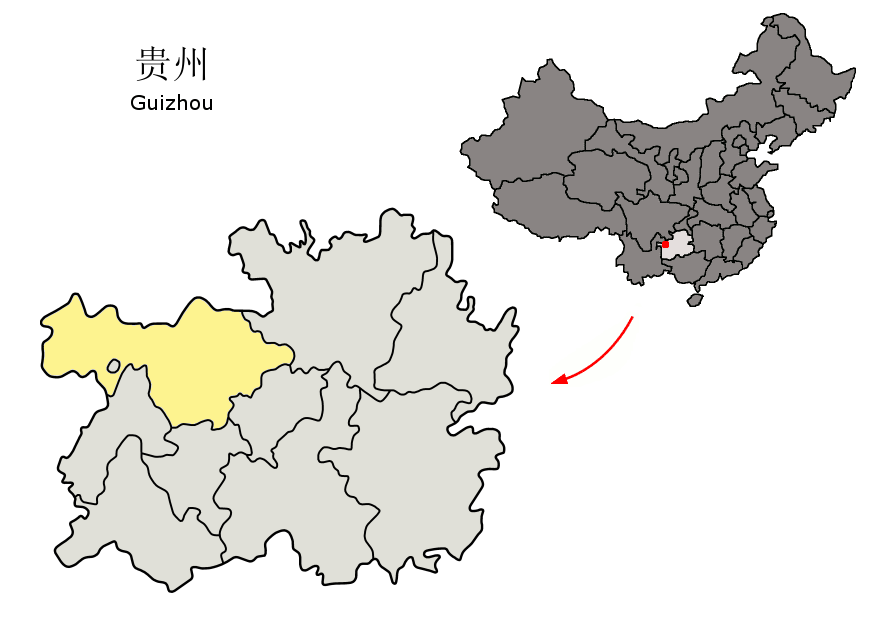
Bijie prefecture within Guizhou province, China

Bijie (1983) reports the Caijia people are found in the seven counties of Bijie prefecture – Qixingguan, Dafang, Qianxi, Zhijin, Nayong, Weining, and Hezhang – comprising a total of over 3,100 households and over 18,000 individuals. Bijie (1983) reports that smaller populations of Caijia people are found in Anshun (with over 400 people) and Liupanshui (with over 3,500 people) prefectures (to the southeast and southwest respectively), as well as Zhaoyang, Yiliang, and Zhenxiong counties in Zhaotong prefecture, Yunnan (to the northwest). Bijie (1983) also contains linguistic data for the Caijia language of Hezhang County.

Caijia speakers are distributed in the following locations in Bijie prefecture (Bo Wenze 2004).

- Lijiazhai 李家寨, Xinying Village 新营村, Xingfa Township 兴发乡, Hezhang County
- Caijiayuan 蔡家园, Yakou Village 垭口村, Songlinpo Township 松林坡乡, Hezhang County
- Lijiagou 李家沟, Kele Township 可乐乡, Hezhang County
- Xinfa Township 新发布依族乡, Weining County (not to be confused with Xingfa Township 兴发乡 in Hezhang County)

Yinajia District 以那架区 has the most ethnic Caijia in Zhijin County. Bijie (1983) also reports the location of Baiyanjiao 白岩脚, Puweng Township 普翁公社, Guiguo District 桂果区, Zhijin County.

The Liupanshui City Ethnic Gazetteer 六盘水市志：民族志 (2003:182–183) lists ethnic Caijia populations for the following counties in the prefecture, with a total of 4,061 (1982):

- Liuzhi: 1,720 (1981), in Niuchang 牛场, Xinchang 新场, Heitang 黑塘
- Shuicheng: 2,296 (1982), in Bide 比德, Huale 化乐, Qinglin 青林, Jinpen 金盆
- Zhongshan District: in Dewu 德坞乡

In Shuicheng County, the Caijia language is still spoken in:

- Chahe 叉河, Jinpen Township 金盆乡
- Caijiapo 蔡家坡, Tujiao Township 土角乡
- Caijiayuan 蔡家园, Shuchang Township 鼠场乡

In Zhenxiong County, Yunnan, the Caijia people are scattered in the village cluster of Sumu 苏木村, and in Chuanjiu 串九, Qinggang 青杠, Liangshui 凉水, Poji 泼机, Nantai 南台, Wugu 五谷 (Zhenxiong County Gazetteer 1986).

== Phonology ==
Lee (2021) gives the following consonants and vowels for the phonology of Caijia:

Consonants
	Labial	Apical	Retroflex	Palatal	Velar	Uvular	Glottal
Nasals	/m/ ⟨m⟩	/n/ ⟨n⟩			/ŋ/ ⟨ng⟩		
Stops	/p/ ⟨b⟩	/t/ ⟨d⟩			/k/ ⟨g⟩	/q/ ⟨gv⟩	
Stops	/pʰ/ ⟨p⟩	/tʰ/ ⟨t⟩			/kʰ/ ⟨k⟩	/qʰ/ ⟨gv⟩	
Stops	/b/ ⟨bb⟩	/d/ ⟨dd⟩			/ɡ/ ⟨gg⟩		
Affricates		/t͡s/ ⟨z⟩	/ʈ͡ʂ/ ⟨zh⟩	/t͡ɕ/ ⟨j⟩			
Affricates		/t͡sʰ/ ⟨c⟩	/ʈ͡ʂʰ/ ⟨ch⟩	/t͡ɕʰ/ ⟨q⟩			
Affricates		/d͡z/ ⟨zz⟩	/ɖ͡ʐ/ ⟨dh⟩	/d͡ʑ/ ⟨jj⟩			
Fricatives	/ɸ/ ⟨f⟩	/s/ ⟨s⟩	/ʂ/ ⟨sh⟩	/ɕ/ ⟨x⟩	/x/ ⟨h⟩	/χ/ ⟨v⟩	
Fricatives	/v/ ⟨wf⟩	/z/ ⟨ss⟩	/ʐ/ ⟨rr⟩	/ʑ/ ⟨xx⟩	/ɣ/ ⟨hh⟩	/ʁ/ ⟨vv⟩	/ɦ/ ⟨vh⟩
Fricatives		/ɬ/ ⟨lh⟩					
Sonorants		/l/ ⟨l⟩	/ɭ/ ⟨rl⟩				
Sonorants	/w/ ⟨w⟩	/ɹ/ ⟨r⟩		/j/ ⟨y⟩			

Vowels
	Front	Center	Back
Close	/ɪ/ ⟨i⟩	/y/ ⟨yu-/-ü⟩	/u/ ⟨u⟩
Mid	/e/ ⟨ea⟩	/ə/ ⟨e⟩	/o/ ⟨o⟩
Open	/æ/ ⟨ae⟩	/ɑ/ ⟨a⟩	

Lee (2021) also notes that vowels can have three additional forms: long ⟨(double letter)⟩, nasal ⟨-nn⟩, and r-colored ⟨-r⟩. Although sources conflict, consonants can additionally be glottalized or pharyngealized, which of the two it is actually unclear. This is presumably marked with their respective IPA symbols.

== Dialects ==
Guizhou (1982) lists the following two dialects of the Caijia language. The Caijia dialect documented in Guizhou (1982) is that of Yangjiazhai 杨家寨, Liangyan Village 亮岩公社, Xingfa District 兴发区, Hezhang County.

1. Xingfa District 兴发区, Hezhang County: Liangyan Village 亮岩公社 (including the main datapoint of Yangjiazhai 杨家寨), Yeli Village 野里公社, and Wocun Village 窝皮寸
2. Kaiping Village 开坪公社, Longchang District 龙场区, Weining County (located near Xinfa Township 新发布依族乡)

Guizhou (1982) notes that the -an rime in Caijia of Xingfa 兴发 corresponds to the -aŋ rime in Caijia of Longchang 龙场.

Hsiu (2018) reports the discovery of a previously undocumented Caijia dialect that is spoken in Niujiaojing 牛角井村, Yangjie Town 羊街镇, Weining County. This Caijia dialect is also spoken in the villages of Xinglongchang 兴隆场村, Niuchishui 牛吃水, and Fadi 发地.

== Names and ethnic subdivisions ==
The Caijia people are ethnoculturally related to the Lu (卢) people (Luren 卢人), who are classified as Manchu by the Chinese government. Luren (Lu) and Caijia are also closely related to Longjia (龙家). Caijia, Longjia, and Lu are all spoken in western Guizhou.

In Weining County, Caijia speakers are officially classified by the Chinese government as ethnic Gelao (Hsiu 2017), while in Hezhang County they are classified as Bai (Bo 2004).

Caijia people with the autonym "Menni" (门尼 or 门你) have also been reported in Puding County, Guizhou, where they were classified as ethnic Gelao during the 1980s (Zhou Guoyan 2004).

In Zhijin County, Guizhou, Caijia people are called Silie 斯列 by the local Miao and Awuna 阿乌纳 by the local Yi (Zhijin County Gazetteer 1997:166).

Ethnic subdivisions of the Caijia people include the Black 黑, White 白, Qingshangshui 青上水, Xiashui 下水, Hanzhan 捍毡, Zhuazhua 抓抓, Datou 大头, Qianqiaoba 乾乔巴, Laohu 老虎, Luoluo 倮倮, Xuejiao 削角 (Xieguo 写果), and Jiandao 剪刀.

Historically recorded names for the Caijia include Caijiazi 蔡家子 and Gantan Caijia 擀毡蔡家. The Yi call the Caijia "Sha'awu 沙阿乌", the Miao call them "Sini 斯你", and other ethnic groups also call them "Xieguo 写果".

Bijie (1983:2–3) lists the following autonyms and exonyms for the Caijia people.

- Autonym: Menni 门你 (IPA: men31 ȵen33)
- Yi (in Dafang County and Zhijin County) exonym: Xieguo, Awuna 阿武哪
- Yi (in Shuicheng County) exonym: Awuna 阿乌纳
- Yi (in Weining County and Weining County) exonym: Awu 阿武
- Miao (in Weining County and Weining County) exonym: Awu 阿乌
- Miao (in Nayong County) exonym: Sinie 斯聂
- Shui (in Puding County and Zhijin County) exonym: Louman 楼慢
- Buyi exonym: Buman 布慢
- Buyi (in Weining County) exonym: Bu'awu 布阿武

== Grammar ==
Lü (2022) is a comprehensive grammar of Caijia.

== See also ==
- List of unrecognized ethnic groups of Guizhou
- Longjia people
- Qixingmin people
- Bo people (China)
- Macro-Bai comparative vocabulary list (Wiktionary)

== Notes and references ==
- https://web.archive.org/web/20110512204947/http://lingweb.eva.mpg.de/numeral/Caijia.htm
- Bo Wenze [薄文泽]. 2004. "A Brief Introduction of Caijia Speech [蔡家话概况]". Minzu Yuwen. http://d.wanfangdata.com.cn/periodical_mzyw200402012.aspx
