= Macro-Bai languages =

Putative group of Sino-Tibetan languages of southern China

Macro-Bai
- (tentative)
- Geographic distribution: Southwestern China
- Linguistic classification: Sino-Tibetan: Sinitic?; Macro-Bai
- Subdivisions: Bai; Cai–Long

Language codes
- Glottolog: macr1275

The Macro-Bai, Greater Bai, or simply Bai languages (Chinese: 白语支) are a putative group of Sino-Tibetan languages proposed in 2010 by the linguist Zhengzhang, who argued that Bai and Caijia are sister languages. In contrast, Sagart argues that Caijia and the Waxiang language of northwestern Hunan constitute an early split off from Old Chinese. Additionally, Longjia and Luren are two extinct languages of western Guizhou closely related to Caijia.

== Languages ==
The languages are:

- Bai, and
- Cai–Long languages: Caijia, Longjia and Luren.

Andreas Hölzl shows that Caijia, Longjia, and Luren are all closely related to each other as part of a linguistic group that he calls Ta–Li or Cai–Long. He also states that Longjia and Luren have a higher percentage of lexical parallels to each other than to Caijia, though emphasizes that past studies have not established regular sound laws between all three languages or clearly distinguished between inherited and borrowed lexical items.

Bai has over a million speakers, but Longjia and Luren may both be extinct, while Caijia is highly endangered with approximately 1,000 speakers. The Qixingmin people of Weining County, Guizhou may have also spoken a Macro-Bai language, but currently speak Luoji.

Similarities among Old Chinese, Waxiang, Caijia, and Bai have been pointed out by Wu Yunji and Shen Ruiqing. Gong Xun noted that Bai has both a Sino-Bai vocabulary layer and a non-Sinitic vocabulary layer, which may be Qiangic. Gong also suggested that the Old Chinese layer in Bai is more similar to early 3rd-century central varieties of Old Chinese in Ji, Yan, Si, and Yu that display the phonological innovation from Old Chinese *l̥ˤ- > *xˤ-, than to the eastern Old Chinese varieties (i.e. Qingzhou and Xuzhou, etc.) that later impacted Middle Chinese, which show OC *l̥ˤ- > *tʰˤ- > MC th-. This east-west dialectal division in Old Chinese have also been noted by William H. Baxter and Laurent Sagart.

== See also ==
- List of unrecognized ethnic groups of Guizhou
- Macro-Bai comparative vocabulary list (Wiktionary)
