= Longjia =

Longjia can refer to:

- Longjia language
- Longjia people
- Longjia railway station
