= Longjia people =

Ethnic group of Guizhou province, China

Location of Guizhou, China

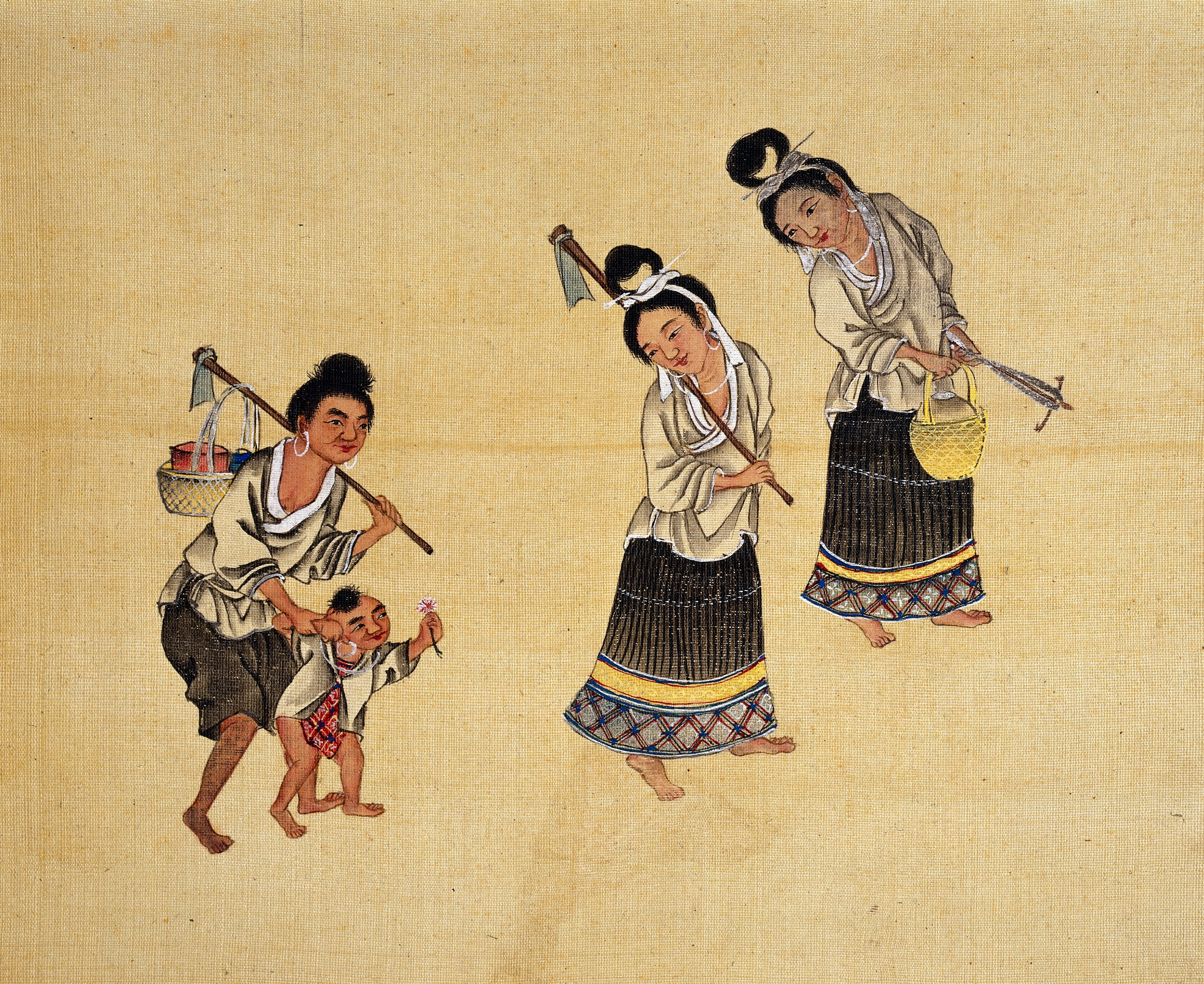
Qing Dynasty-era painting of Madeng Longjia (马镫龙家) people

The Longjia (Chinese: 龙家; sometimes also known as the Nanjingren, 南京人) are an ethnic group in western Guizhou province, China. They are officially classified as Bai by the Chinese government.

== History ==
Along with the neighboring Gelao, Miao, and Caijia peoples, the Longjia people had been a subjugated ethnic group under Nasu Yi control in Shuixi 水西 (modern-day Bijie Prefecture) during the Ming Dynasty. Nevertheless, the Longjia were given minor administrative posts since the Yi considered the Longjia to be the best educated among the subjugated ethnic groups, whereas the closely related Caijia people were often assigned to assist in horse stables due to their skills with horses (Herman 2007:74, 77). The Nasu Yi were not native to western Guizhou, but had migrated from the Luyang Mountains of northeastern Yunnan (in modern-day Huize, Xuanwei, and Dongchuan) during the 3rd century and founded the Mu'ege Kingdom around 300 C.E.

== Names ==
In Zhijin County, the Longjia people (autonym: Songnibao 松尼保) are called Buwai 补外 by the Gelao, Siqie 斯切 (or Siye 斯业) by the Miao, and Awupu 阿武普 by the Yi (Zhijin County Gazetteer 1997:159). They are also called Guizou 归走 by the Caijia.

Guizhou (1984:8) lists the following exonyms for the Longjia people in IPA.

- Yi exonym: a33 vu33 pu33
- Miao exonym: sɯ33 ȵnɛ33
- Caijia exonym: kui33 teu33
- Gelao exonym: pu33 wɛ33

The Han Chinese call the Longjia by the following names (Zhijin County Gazetteer 1997).

- Gou'er Longjia 狗耳龙家: Dading 大定 (present-day Dafang), Anshun, and Kangzuosi 康左司 of Guangshun 广顺州 (present-day Changshun)
- Madeng Longjia 马镫龙家: in Dading 大定 (present-day Dafang), Zhenning
- Datou Longjia 大头龙家: in Puding, Zhenning
- Cengzhu Longjia 曾竹龙家: in Dafang
- Xiaotou Longjia 小头龙家
- Bai Longjia 白龙家

== Language ==
The Longjia language is a Sino-Tibetan language.

== Distribution ==
There is a total of 2,000–4,000 Longjia people in Pu'an, Pingba, and Qingzhen counties, Guizhou, as well as Longlin County of Guangxi. Within Bijie Prefecture, the Longjia are found in the counties of Bijie, Dafang, Zhijin, Qianxi, and Nayong. The Xixiu District Gazetteer 安顺市志：西秀区志 (2007:110) reports an ethnic Bai (Longjia) population of 1,458 households or 6,562 persons.

Reported locations include (Guizhou 1984:6):

- Dafang County
  - Baibu River 白布河 area (both sides)
  - Wuxizhai, Xiaotun Township 小屯乡乌溪寨
  - Liuzhai, Xiangshui Township 响水乡六寨
  - Guomu, Lihua Township 理化乡果木
  - Yiduo, Guobao Township 果宝乡以朵
- Qianxi County: Yuying 雨阴, Luhua 绿化, Longchang 龙场, Tianping 天坪, Huahuan 花缓, Huaxizhai 花溪寨
- Zhijin County: Daga 大嘎, Sanjia 三甲
- Nayong County: Jianxinhe 建新河, Yangchang 羊场, Dongguan 东关; Weixin 维新, Longchang 龙场, Zhikun 治昆
- Anshun: Caiguan 蔡官, Huayan 华严, Erpu 二铺, Jiuzhou 旧州, Shuangbao 双堡 (in 35 natural villages, including Mutou 木头 and Taodui 讨兑 in the north; Ninggu 宁谷, Laotanghe 老塘河, Longga 陇嘎 in the central area; Xilong 西陇 and Zhemo Longtan 者模龙潭 in the east)
- Puding County: Jiangyi 讲义, Huangmao 黄毛; Tianba 田坝 of Gumao 谷毛
- Bijie: Shuanghua 双华, Songlin 松林, Zhenxi 镇西
- Hezhang County: Wopicun 窝皮寸

Population figures are as follows.

- Guizhou (total): 78,192
  - Dafang County: 24,790
  - Qianxi County: 13,268
  - Bijie: 12,847
  - Zhijin County: 4,859
  - Hezhang County: 7,352
  - Nayong County: 3,942
  - Qingzhen County: 3,135
  - Shuicheng County: 2,936
  - Anshun: 2,996
  - Puding County: 857
  - Weining County: 492
  - Pingba County: 439

The Duan clan 段氏 of Dafang County, the Shang clan 尚氏 of Nayong County, and the Yang clan 杨氏 of Pan County are officially classified as ethnic Bai, but belong to neither the Longjia nor Qixingmin groups (Guizhou Ethnic Gazetteer 2002:690).

=== Historical distribution ===
According to the Guizhou Ethnic Gazetteer (2002:689), the Dading Gazetteer (大定府志) gave the following townships with Longjia residents during the late Qing Dynasty.

- Dafang County
  - Baina District 百纳区: Sheba 摄坝乡, Pengcheng 棚程乡
  - Jichang District 鸡场区: Zaigong 在拱乡
  - Lihua District 里化区: Lihua 里化镇, Xiaotun 小屯乡, Changchun 长春乡
  - Machang District 马场区: Guobao 果宝乡
  - Pojiao District 坡脚区: Changchong 长冲乡
  - Shuangshan District 双山区: Wenge 文阁乡, Maosu 毛粟乡
  - Xiangshui District 响水区: Dazhai 大寨乡, Baini 白泥乡, Dadao 大道乡, Xiangshui 响水镇
  - Daxi District 达溪区: Gaoshi 高视乡, Bazi 坝子乡
  - Piaojing District 飘井区: Shangba 上坝乡, Babao 八堡乡, Guobang 果帮乡
  - Changshi District 长石区: Zhangda 张大乡, Longli 隆里乡, Guowa 果瓦乡
- Zhijin County
  - Babu District 八步区: Shagui 沙桂乡, Chadian 茶店乡
  - Yinajia District 以那架区: Guoyong 果永乡
- Nayong County
  - Longchang District 龙场区: Yangchang 羊场乡, Yindi 阴底乡
  - Weixin District 维新区: Dongdi 董地乡, Dongguan 东关乡
  - Zhikun District 治昆区: Jianxinhe 建新河乡
- Bijie
  - Zhuchang District 朱昌区: Mulai 木来乡, Shuanghua 双华乡
  - Yachi District 鸭池区: Baohe 保河乡
- Jinsha County
  - Anle District 安乐区: Datian 大田乡

=== Dafang County ===
The Dafang County Gazetteer (1996:150–152) also reports Longjia people living in Dazhai 大寨 and Dadao 大道 of Dafang County, with more than 2,000 living in each. In Dafang County, villages that have between 1,000 – 2,000 Longjia people include Hegu 河谷, Bazi 坝子, Lihua 里/理化, Pengcheng 鹏程, Changshi 长石, Hetao 核桃, Guobao 果宝, Zhuchang 珠场, Xiangshuizhen 响水镇, Shangba 上坝, and Zeji 则鸡. Longjia with the autonym Songlibao 松立保 have also been reported in Jingzhu 荆竹村 and Bayi 八一村 villages in Babao Township 八堡乡, Dafang County.

Other locations are Cuoba 撮坝, Pengcheng 鹏程, Changchun 长春, Baini 白泥, Guowa 果瓦, Shangba 上坝, and Maopiao 毛票.

=== Bijie County ===
The Bijie County Gazetteer (1996:143) reports the following locations of ethnic Longjia.

- Dazhai and Xiejiazhai of Shuanghua, Chahe Township 岔河镇双华大寨、谢家寨
- Songlinzhai and Xiaohe of Lishu Township 梨树乡松林寨、小河
- Dazhai, Zhenxi, Duipo Township 对坡镇镇西大寨
- Caiguantun, Changchunbao Township 长春堡镇蔡官屯
- Dazhai, Qingchang 青场大寨
- Zhaojiazhai, Bazhai 八寨乡赵家寨
- Datun, Yindi 阴底大屯

The Bijie County Gazetteer (1996:143) reports that the Bai people speak a language called Nanlong 南龙语.

=== Ethnic townships ===
The Chinese government has designated the following 15 townships in Guizhou as ethnic Bai townships (白族乡). Some have ethnic Longjia populations, while others have ethnic Caijia populations.

- Shuicheng County 水城县
  - Longchang 龙场苗族白族彝族乡
  - Yingpan 营盘苗族彝族白族乡
- Pan County 盘县
  - Jiuying 旧营白族彝族苗族乡
  - Yangchang 羊场布依族白族苗族乡
- Bijie 毕节市
  - Yindi 阴底彝族苗族白族乡
  - Qianxi 千溪彝族苗族白族乡
- Dafang County 大方县
  - Xiangshui 响水白族彝族仡佬族乡
  - Sanyuan 三元彝族苗族白族乡
  - Pudi 普底彝族苗族白族乡
  - Hetao 核桃彝族白族乡
- Qianxi County 黔西县
  - Luhua 绿化白族彝族乡
- Zhijin County 织金县
  - Sanjia 三甲白族苗族乡
- Nayong County 纳雍县
  - Shedongguan 厍东关彝族苗族白族乡
  - Kunzhai 昆寨苗族彝族白族乡
- Hezhang County 赫章县
  - Songlinpo 松林坡白族彝族苗族乡

== See also ==
- Qixingmin people
- List of unrecognized ethnic groups of Guizhou
