= Unrecognized villages =

Unrecognized villages may refer to:

- Unrecognized Bedouin villages in Israel
- Unrecognized communities of Alaska Native tribes

== See also ==
- Unrecognized ethnic groups in China
  - List of unrecognized ethnic groups of Guizhou
  - State-recognized tribes
- List of organizations that self-identify as Native American tribes
- Unrecognized state
