= Chuanqing people =

East Asian ethnic group

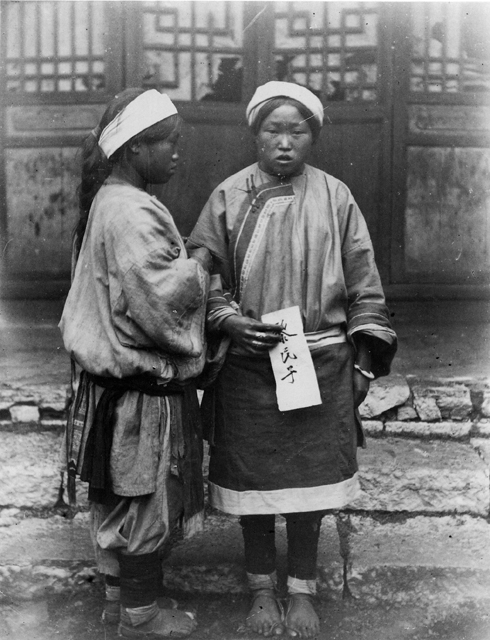
- Chuanqing people, descendants of Ming Loyalists in Langdai, taken in 1900

Total population
- about 670,000

Regions with significant populations
- Guizhou, China

Languages
- Southwestern Mandarin

Religion
- Buddhism, Taoism, Confucianism, folk religion, animism, Christianity

Related ethnic groups
- Tunbao, Han Chinese

The Chuanqing people (Chinese: 穿青人; pinyin: Chuānqīngrén) are an East Asian ethnic group. According to popular ethnogenesis, they are descended from Han Chinese soldiers who were sent to Guizhou area in the eighth and ninth centuries to quell Miao rebellions.

The Chuanqings view themselves as a distinct ethnic group. Most of them live in the Anshun area of Guizhou province. Other locals call the Chuanqings "Da Jiao Ban" (Big Foot) or "Da Xiuzi" (Big Sleeves). They have a unique spirituality involving worship of a god called Wuxian (五显).

== Names ==
Their name, Chuanqing, literally means wear-blacks because that is the color of their traditional clothing.

The Liupanshui City Ethnic Gazetteer (2003:178) lists the following names for the Chuanqing people of Liupanshui prefecture.

- Turen (土人)
- Limin/Liminzi (里民/里民子) (里珉子) (some of whom call themselves Li 黎族)

The Chuanqing are also given various exonyms by the following ethnic groups.

- Yi: Shaloumi (沙楼米)
- Miao: Sagelou (撒格娄)
- Buyei: Hayao (哈腰)
- Gelao: Baosha (褒沙)

== Distribution ==
The Chuanqing are believed to number about 700,000, mostly in mountain villages in and around Zhijin.

The Liupanshui City Ethnic Gazetteer (2003:178) lists populations for the following counties in Liupanshui prefecture.

- Liupanshui City: 14,227 households, 71,457 persons
- Liuzhi Special District: 2,466 households, 12,330 persons
- Pan County: 811 households, 4,048 persons
- Shuicheng County: 10,950 households, 54,752 persons

== Language ==
Traditionally Chuanqing speak Chuanqing dialect, which is a dialect under Gan Chinese, also called "Laobeizi dialect". Their language typically has a subject-object-verb word order.

== See also ==
- List of unrecognized ethnic groups of Guizhou
