= Cai–Long languages =

Group of Sino-Tibetan languages of western Guizhou, China

Cai–Long
- Ta–Li
- (tentative)
- Geographic distribution: western Guizhou, China
- Linguistic classification: Sino-Tibetan: Sinitic?; Macro-Bai?; Cai–Long
- Subdivisions: Caijia; Longjia–Luren? †

Language codes
- Glottolog: tali1265

The Cai–Long (Chinese: 蔡龙语支) or Ta–Li languages are a group of Sino-Tibetan languages spoken in western Guizhou, China. Only Caijia is still spoken, while Longjia and Luren are extinct. The branch was first recognized by Chinese researchers in the 1980s, with the term Cai–Long (Chinese: 蔡龙语支) first mentioned in Guizhou (1982: 43).

Cai–Long languages are primarily spoken in China's southern regions, particularly in China's southwest in Guizhou. Guizhou is a diverse region exhibiting different languages, such as the Sino-Tibetan languages: Southwestern Mandarin, Laba Miao Chinese, Yi 彝, formerly Bo/Bai, Tunbu/Tunbao Chinese, Tujia and Chuanqing Chinese; the Hmong-Mien languages: Xong, Hmong and Yao; and the Kra-Dai languages: Dong/Kam, Buyi/Bouyei, Gelao, formerly also Mulao, Sui/Shui, and Yi 羿. The Cai–Long languages are unclassified within Sino-Tibetan, and could be Sinitic or Macro-Bai.

== Languages ==
The classification of the Cai–Long languages within Sino-Tibetan is not generally agreed upon by linguists. Cai–Long languages are reported by some scholars to belong to a Macro-Bai subgroup and are closest to the language of the Bai. In 2010, Zhengzhang Shangfang argued that Caijia and Bai are sister languages in this subgroup.

Conversely, Laurent Sagart (2011) believed that Caijia and Northwestern Hunan's Waxiang language are early branches that split off from Old Chinese and hence form a unique lineage within Sino-Tibetan.

The Cai–Long languages are limited to Caijia that is in use now and Longjia and Luren that are under threat of extinction due to Mandarine Chinese and Zhuang dominating in that region. However, generally there are three main classifications for the Cai–Long languages:

- Caijia
- Longjia (extinct)
- Luren (extinct)

In addition, the Max Planck Institute for Evolutionary Anthropology, through their Glottolog database, proposes that Longjia and Luren form a Longjia–Luren branch within Cai–Long based on Hölzl (2021). Hölzl (2021) also states that Longjia and Luren have a higher percentage of lexical parallels to each other than to Caijia, though emphasizes that past studies have not established regular sound laws between all three languages or clearly distinguished between inherited and borrowed lexical items. He also states that the unattested language Songjia is likely a Cai-Long language as far as can be determined.

=== Caijia Language ===
The only surviving language of Cai–Long group is Caijia and is critically endangered with a speaker base of approximately 1,000. Caijia is primarily located in western Guizhou province. It possesses unique linguistic features that have created conflict in its classification. It has been identified with language of Bai and early Chinese by certain scholars. It is the ethnic language of the Caijia people mainly inhabiting the Hèzhāng 赫章 and Wēiníng 威寧 counties. Most of the native speakers of this language are old people with young and middle aged population who are capable of speaking this language using it as a second language. Most of Caijia people use South-Western Mandarin language as their first language. Caijia is closely related to Longjia and Luren, which were formerly spoken in Guìzhōu. Caijia has a total of 25 consonantal phonemes with the phonemic contrast lying in the voicing. Its vowel /ɨ/ is phonetically identical to non-onset syllabus part which is transcribed in Mandarin as zi, ci, si, zhi, chi, shi, ri, in. Caijia has five tones, which are 21,22,33,35, and 55 with tone Sandhi absent in Caijia. Changed tine is not used in Caijia.

=== Longjia Language ===
Longjia is an extinct language that used to be used in western Guizhou. There is less documentation on Longjia. However, it is known to have a close link with Caijia and Luren. The language became extinct in the middle of the 20th century, with assimilation into mainstream Chinese dialects being a major contributing factor. Most of its speakers have undergone language shift, opting to use Southwestern Mandarin. Majority of Longjia people are classified as Bai minority and located in Anshun and Bijie. This language lacks a written form and the only available materials are large and restricted to data recorded in the 1980s from diverse Longjia spoken in Pojiao 坡脚. Only a few materials are available from Huaxi (Hölzl, 2021).

=== Luren Language ===
Luren or Lu is a now-extinct language of western Guizhou. Like Longjia, Luren had a close relationship with Caijia. Its lexical are related to those of Longjia and Caijia. It belongs to the oldest branch of Sinitic and is only recorded in brief world lists. All of Luren speakers, as of 2019 had shifted to Southwestern Mandarin (Hölzl, 2021). Since the 1980s, Luren have problematically been classified as Manchus, or the Caijai for diverse peoples and Longjia mainly as the minority Bai group. The language is assumed to have died out in the 1960s when speakers shifted to a more significant regional language.

== Lexical innovations ==
Hölzl (2021) proposes the name Ta–Li as a portmanteau of the two lexical innovations ‘two’ and ‘pig’, respectively.

Language	‘two’	‘pig’
Caijia (Hezhang)	ta^{55}	li^{21}
Luren (Qianxi)	ta^{31}	li^{31}
Longjia (Pojiao/Huaxi)	ta^{31}	lɛ^{55}

The Cai–Long languages possess major lexical innovations that distinguish them from other Sino-Tibetan languages. A major transformation is in the items for 'two' and 'pig'. It is appreciated that ‘two’ and ‘pig’ are expressed as ‘ta’ and ‘li’ respectively in Caijia language, whereas the words are expressed similarly in the Luren language as in the Caijia language. The word ‘two’ is expressed by ‘ta’ and ‘pig’ as pig by ‘lɛ’ in Longjia language. Therefore it is vivid that these items are not attested in related languages and indicate independence in evolution within the Cai-Long subgroup.

Moreover, Cai–Long languages conserved certain phenomena in their phonology that have been otherwise lost in the Sino-Tibetan languages. Preservation of initial consonant groups and certain tonal patterns remind us of ancient phonology in the region. These occurrences reveal their diversity in linguistic and historical importance of Cai-long languages in Sino-Tibetan.

Lexical components of Longjia, Luren and Caijia resemble each other but are quite different from those of Hmong and Guìzhōu Naxi. This is why Longjia and Luren are tentatively treated as sister languages of Caijia. Lexical comparison between the three languages shows that 58 percent of Longjia lexical parallels out of 140 items with Luren. On the other hand, 36 percent out of 800 items of Caijia lexical parallel with that of Luren. Longjia also has some lexical which are parallel with varieties of Gelao (Kra-Dai), Miao (Hmong-Mien) and Yi (Sino-Tibetan) indicating a certain amount of language contact and lexical diffusion in the language.

== Sociolinguistic context ==
The extinction of Longjia and Luren, and the endangered condition of Caijia are representative of more pervasive sociolinguistic patterns in the region. Continued language shift towards major Chinese dialects, urbanization, and assimilation policies have long been among the driving forces to their extinction. The documentation and language revitalization of Caijia are vital in preserving the linguistic heritage of the Cai-Long subgroup and understanding the complex texture of Sino-Tibetan languages.

Under the Sino-Tibetan linguistic heritage, the Cai–Long languages are a very valuable and distinctive component. Notwithstanding the fact that a minority of these languages is used as a medium of communication at present, others are extinct and/or vulnerable. The three languages are closely related, especially their lexical characteristics. This may be attributed to their common origin and also the region in which they were commonly used, which is the Southwestern Guizhou. The extinction of Luren and Longjia and the increasing threat of Caijai’s extinction may be attributed to the current sociolinguistic changes such as urbanization and assimilation. The socio-linguistic dynamics and lexical innovations as well as the phonological features of the Cai–Long languages are a key point for future linguistic research and preservation.

== See also ==
- List of unrecognized ethnic groups of Guizhou
- Macro-Bai comparative vocabulary list (Wiktionary)
