= Luren language =

Extinct Sino-Tibetan language of Guizhou, southwestern China

Lu
- Luren
- Native to: China
- Region: Guizhou
- Ethnicity: Luren
- Extinct: 1960s?
- Language family: Sino-Tibetan: Sinitic?; Macro-Bai?; Cai–Long; Longjia–Luren?; Lu

Language codes
- ISO 639-3: None (mis)
- Glottolog: lure1234

Luren (卢人), Liuezi, Lujia or Lu is the extinct Sino-Tibetan language of the Luren who live in Guizhou, China. The Luren language may have been extinct since the 1960s when many Luren assimilated into a local Manchu community, leading to all Luren being misclassified as Manchu by the Chinese government. Luren is most closely related to other Ta-Li languages. The Luren language only has a few hundred attested words, toponyms and personal names and is understudied.

== Classification ==
The clasification of the Ta-Li languages within the Sino-Tibetan language family is highly disputed. For example Zhengzhang (2010) suggests that Caijia and Bai form a Macro-Bai branch, while Sagart argues that Caijia and Waxiang represent an early split from Old Chinese.

=== Proposed split ===
Andreas Holzl argues that the six attested wordlists for the Luren languages could include two unrelated languages. The first he calls Luren A or Lujia which is a Ta-Li language as Luren is traditionally classified. The second he terms Luren B or Jinshaic which seems to be unrelated to the Kra-Dai, Sino-Tibetan, Hmong-Mien and Austroasiatic language families thus may be a language isolate. Luren B has only a few terms that are variously similar to Ta-Li, Sino-Tibetan and Kra-Dai languages but most words seemingly have no clear plausible relatives.

=== Yiyu Daozhuang ===
Andrea Holzi mentions the Luren of Dafang County have an oral tradition of a possible third language called Yíyu Daozhuang. It supposedly used their native grammar, but most of the words belonged to the previously hegemonic Nasu language.

== Distribution ==
The Luren mostly live in northwest Guìzhōu 贵州 province, including Qiánxī 黔西, Jīnshā 金沙, or Dàfāng 大方 counties and the prefecture-level city Bìjié 毕节. In Dafang County, the Luren are located in Huangni 黄泥乡, Dashui 大水乡, Gamu 嘎木乡, and Shachang 纱厂镇 townships (Dafang County Gazetteer 1996:157).

== See also ==
- Macro-Bai comparative vocabulary list (Wiktionary)
