= Longjia language =

Endangered Sino-Tibetan language of China

Longjia
- Songnibao
- suŋ55 ni55 mpau21
- Pronunciation: [suŋ˥ni˥mpau˨˩]
- Native to: China
- Region: Guizhou
- Ethnicity: Longjia
- Extinct: possibly by 2011
- Language family: Sino-Tibetan: Sinitic?; Macro-Bai?; Cai–Long; Longjia–Luren?; Longjia
- Dialects: Pojiao; Huaxi; Jiangyizhai; Caiguan

Language codes
- ISO 639-3: None (mis)
- Glottolog: long1417

Longjia (autonym: suŋ55 ni55 mpau21) is a Sino-Tibetan language of Guizhou, China related to Caijia and Luren. Longjia may already be extinct (Zhao 2011).

The Longjia people now speak Southwestern Mandarin, though they used to speak their own language, and have had a long presence in western Guizhou. According to the Guizhou Ethnic Gazetteer (2002), the Longjia language was spoken in Dafang County, Qianxi County (Zhongping District 中坪区; Xinfacun 新发村 of Pojiao District 坡脚区), and Puding County (Jiangyizhai 讲义寨 of Baiyan Township 白岩乡). It is reportedly most similar to Caijia, and has many Old Chinese loanwords.

== Classification ==
A 1984 report shows that Longjia is closely related to Caijia and Luren. However, the classification of Caijia within Sino-Tibetan is uncertain. Zhengzhang (2010) suggests that Caijia and Bai are sister languages, while Sagart argues that Caijia is Sinitic and a close relative of Waxiang.

== Dialects ==
The following dialects of Longjia have been described.

- Pojiao District 坡脚区, Dafang County, Guizhou (Pojiao District now comprises Maochang 猫场镇, Dingxin 鼎新彝族苗族乡, and Lütang 绿塘乡 townships of southwestern Dafang County.)
- Huaxi Village 花溪大队, Zhongping District 中坪区, Qianxi County (now Huaxi Township 花溪彝族苗族乡)
- Jiangyizhai 讲义寨, Puding County
- Caiguan Town 蔡官镇, Anshun City, Guizhou

The following comparative word list of three Longjia dialects is from Guizhou (1984:2-3). Guizhou (1984) notes that the dialect of Jiangyizhai 讲义寨 (Puding County) is divergent, while the dialects of Pojiao 坡脚 (Dafang County) and Huaxi 花溪 (Qianxi County) are more closely related to each other.

English gloss	Chinese gloss	Pojiao 坡脚	Huaxi 花溪	Jiangyizhai 讲义寨
cattle	牛	ŋau55	ŋau55	ŋau35
to eat	吃	ua31	ua31	ua31
dog	狗	kuɛ33	kuɛ33	kuɛ53
pig	猪	lɛ55	lɛ55	lɛ35
chicken	鸡	kɛ55	kɛ55	kɛ55
rice (crop)	稻谷	mɛ31	mɛ31	mai31
water	水	ɕi31	ɕe31	se31
big	大	la55	la55	lɛ31
two	二	ta31	ta31	to33
four	四	sɿ55	si55	so55
meat	肉	ȵi31	ȵi31	ȵi31; ntɕi31

== Phonology ==
The Puding County Almanac (1999) reports that the Longjia language (autonym: Songnibao 松泥保) has 38 onsets and 22 rimes (8 simple, 14 complex). The Bijie County Almanac (1996:143) reports that there are many prenasalized onsets. In Dafang County, the autonym is Songlibao 松立保.

The most extensive lexical data of Longjia can be found in Zhang & Li (1982).

== Nanjinghua ==
The Nanjing people (南京人) have usually been classified with the Longjia people, and claim to be descendants of soldiers from the Nanjing area who had intermarried with the local Longjia in Guizhou. Their language is known as Nanjinghua (南京话; "Nanjing speech"), which is probably now functionally extinct.

In Jianxinhe village 建新河村, Kunzhai Township 昆寨乡, Nayong County, Guizhou Province, the phrase suo55 mu33 ‘eat rice’ was elicited from an elderly rememberer of Nanjinghua. As suo55 is derived from Proto-Tibeto-Burman *dzya ‘to eat’, this points to Nanjinghua having an SVO word order like Caijia, Longjia, Bai, and Sinitic languages.

== See also ==
- Macro-Bai comparative vocabulary list (Wiktionary)
