= Water Banquet =

Set of Chinese dishes in broths, gravies, and juices

The Water Banquet (Chinese: 水席; pinyin: shǔixí) is a Chinese set of dishes comprising eight cold and 16 warm dishes cooked in various broths, gravies, and juices. It is considered one of the "Three Wonders of Luoyang"—a former Chinese capital located in Henan—along with the peony and the Longmen Grottoes. It has a history going back more than 1,000 years and the residents of Luoyang often use the Water Banquet to treat important guests or for important celebrations.

== History ==
The Water Banquet is an offshoot of Henan cuisine and has existed since the Sui dynasty. It is sometimes credited to the Tang dynasty's Yuan Tiangang, with the story that the dishes were supposed to mimic the life of Wu Zetian, who seized power to rule as the empress of the restored Zhou dynasty. When this story is alluded to, it is known as the "Empress Wu Banquet". It was known as the "Luoyang Banquet" during the Song. It particularly suits the city of Luoyang, whose dry climate, mountainous terrain, and lack of fruit makes soupy meals an attractive option.

There are vegetables and meat dishes, cold and warm, and all kinds of flavors. There are, in total, 24 dishes. Every dish is served in bowls rather than plates and another meaning of its name comes from the way that diners are served their dishes in sequence, like flowing water. First, eight cold dishes are served with other drinks. The next 16 are the warm dishes, served in different-sized under-glazed blue bowls. They are divided into five courses, four courses of three dishes with similar flavors and then a final course of four dishes served at the end. In the first four courses, there will be a "big dish", accompanied by two "small dishes" as side dishes. This is called "going to the imperial court with sons" (带子上朝). The first course's "big dish" is made of shredded turnip, which mimics the flavor of swallow's nest soup and is called the "Swallow Dish". The fourth "big dish" is either sweet vegetables or soup. The four "end dishes" are all soups, including sour vegetable egg soup, the "farewell dish".

=== Legend of the Swallow Dish ===
The "Swallow Dish" of the first hot course. It is said that when Wu Zetian was in Luoyang, a giant turnip weighing tens of kilograms grew in Dongguan. Farmers thought it was a miracle and dedicated it to the Empress. Wu, tired of sumptuous feasts, was curious about what dishes could be made from turnip. The imperial cooks studied it and decided to steam the shredded turnip mixed with starch, then blend it in a broth. The Empress was very impressed by the swallow's nest-like flavor and complimented it, giving it its present name. In October 1973, Premier Zhou Enlai accompanied the Prime Minister of Canada to Luoyang. Chefs Wang Changsheng and Li Daxiong made the Swallow Dish and the two leaders ordered it twice. Because there was a carved peony in the dish, Premier Zhou remarked, "Luoyang's peonies are the best in the world. It even grows in these dishes. They should be called the 'Peony Swallow Dish'." The name has since been applied.
