= Longjia railway station =

Railway station in Changchun, Jilin, China

Longjia 龙嘉
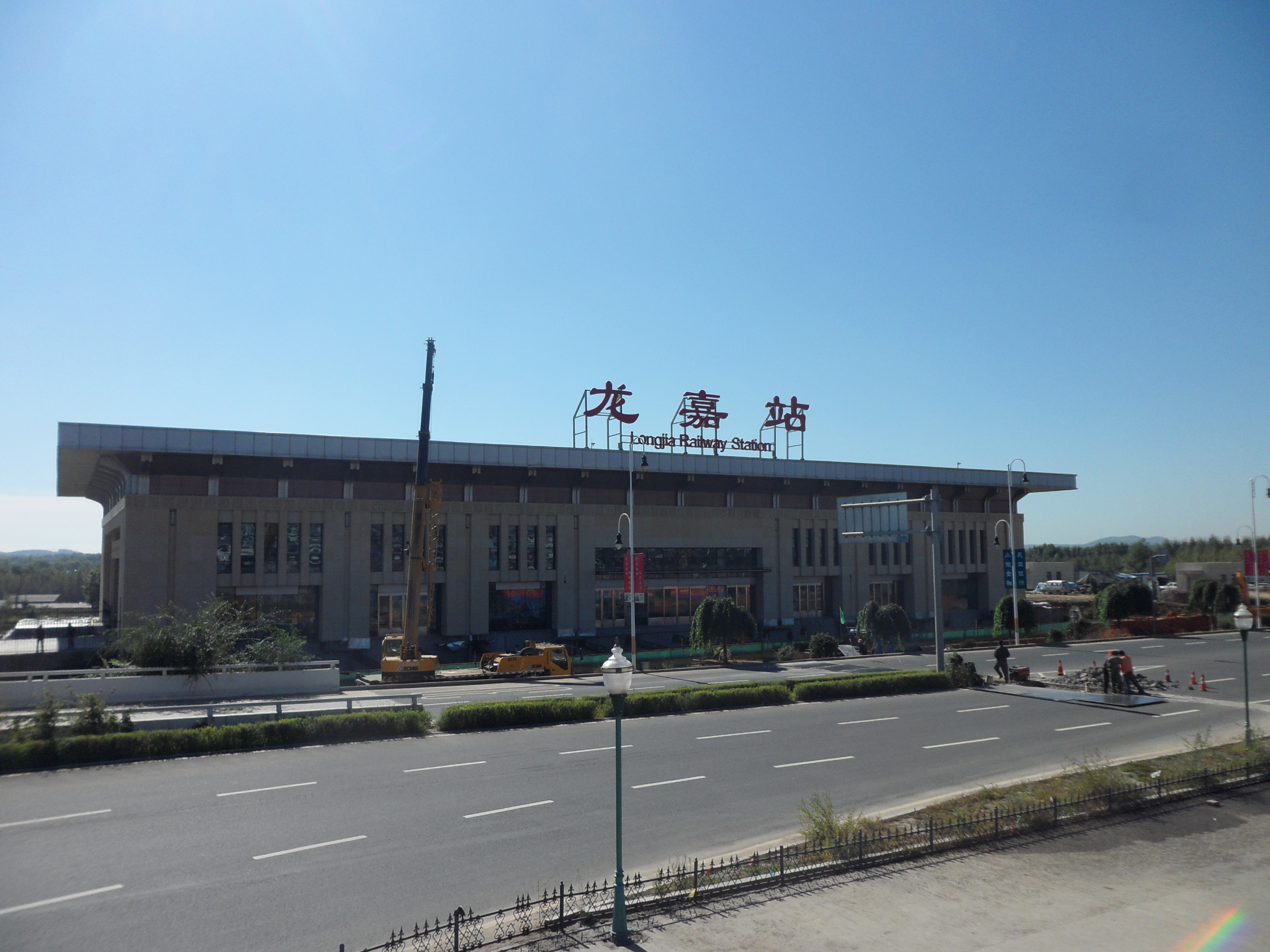

General information
- Location: Changchun, Jilin; China
- Operated by: China Railway High-speed, China Railway Corporation
- Line: Changchun–Jilin intercity railway
- Platforms: 2
- Connections: Changchun Longjia International Airport

History
- Opened: 11 January 2011
Location

Longjia railway station is a railway station of the Changchun–Jilin intercity railway. It is located on the basement of the Changchun Longjia International Airport of Changchun, in the Jilin province of China, there are currently high-speed rail connecting the station with Changchun as well as Jilin. It opened on 11 January 2011.

In the future, Changchun Rail Transit Line 9 will also serve the airport, and this station.

Preceding station	China Railway High-speed	Following station
Changchun Terminus	Changchun–Jilin intercity railway	Jiutai South towards Jilin
