= Luoji language =

Loloish language of Guizhou, China

Luoji
- Qixingmin
- Native to: China
- Ethnicity: Qixingmin
- Language family: Sino-Tibetan: (Tibeto-Burman); Lolo–Burmese; Loloish; Nisoish; Northern Loloish; Nasoid; Luoji

Language codes
- ISO 639-3: None (mis)
- Glottolog: None

Luoji (autonym: luo31 dʑi33) is a moribund Loloish language of Weining County, Guizhou, China that is spoken by the Qixingmin people. There are a few semi-fluent elderly speakers in Shejie Village 蛇街村, Yangjie Town 羊街镇, Weining County, with no fluent speakers remaining.

== Classification ==
The Qixingmin speak a language closely related to the local Yi language, which is intermediate between the Western and Eastern Yi dialects of Weining County (Weining 1997:328). Some vocabulary items differ, such as the word for 'chili pepper' (Chinese: 辣椒), which is "zi 自" in the Western Yi dialect, "shapo 傻迫" in the Eastern Yi dialect, and "boji 薄几" in Qixingmin.

However, the Qixingmin claim that they are distinct from the Yi, and that their ancestors spoke a non-Yi language that had become extinct centuries ago.

Qixingmin is geographically located between the Western Yi and Eastern Yi areas. These languages are spoken in:

- Qixingmin ("Qixingmin Liangzi" 七姓民梁子): Xiangshui 响水, Jinhai 金海, Sandaohe 三道河, Shejie 蛇街, Yangjie 羊街, and Yanjia 严家
- Western Yi: Guanfenghai 观风海, Niupeng 牛棚, Dajie 大街, and Longjie 龙街
- Eastern Yi: Yancang 盐仓, Jinzhong 金钟, and Ertang 二塘
