= List of unrecognized ethnic groups of Guizhou =

There are dozens of ethnic groups in Guizhou province of China that are not officially recognized. These ethnic groups and their languages include:

- Caijia 蔡家
- Chuanlan 穿兰: over 300,000 people classified as Han, in Anshun Prefecture; many also speak Bouyei and Miao
- Chuanqing 穿青: 500,000–1,000,000 people classified as Han, mostly in Zhijin and Nayong, but also in Dafang, Shuicheng, Guanling, Qingzhen, Puding, and Liuzhi counties of Guizhou; has some non-Chinese loanwords
- Limin 里民: 50,000–100,000 people classified as Yi and sometimes as Li, in Liuzhi, Guanling, Pu'an, Xingren, Zhenning, and Anlong counties of western Guizhou; most have shifted to Southwestern Mandarin, with few Limin speakers remaining. Also in Qinglong (Qinglong County Gazetteer 1993). Wang (2011) has researched ethnic Limin villages including Fanhua Village 凡化村, Pogong Township 坡贡镇, Guanling County.
- Liujia 六甲: 4,000 (1999) people classified as Han, in Congjiang County, Guizhou. Hou Jingrong (2009) considers the Liujia language to be a Yue Chinese dialect. In Guangxi, Liujia is spoken in Sanjiang County (in the townships of Guyi 古宜镇, Chengcun 程村乡, Doujiang 斗江镇, Zhouping 周坪乡, Laobao 老堡乡, and Zhouzhou 丹洲镇) and Rongshui County (in Dalang and Danian).
- Longjia 龙家
- Lu 卢: 3,000–6,000 people classified as Manchu, in Dafang, Qianxi (in Fuyuan 附源村 of Jinpo 金坡乡), and Bijie counties, Guizhou; also in Anluo 安洛, Jinsha County; the Lu now speak Southwestern Mandarin. In Qianxi County, the ethnic Manchu (pop. 916 as of 1990) are known as Lu'eren 禄额子, Luren 禄人, and Yuanren 原人, and are distributed in Huangni Township 黄泥乡 of Shachang District 沙厂区, as well as Dashui 大水, Gamu 嘎木乡, and Shachang 沙厂镇. Subdivisions include the White Luren 白卢人 and Black Luren 黑卢人.
- Nanjing people 南京人: 120,000 people classified as Bai, in Bijie, Dafang (in Shagou 沙沟村 and Dongfeng 东丰村), Liupanshui, Qianxi, Weining, Jinsha, Nayong, Anshun, Qingzhen, and Zhijin counties of western Guizhou; some speak the Longjia language. Ertang Township 二塘乡, Zhongshan District 钟山区 has a population of 2,262 Nanjingren, with a total of 2,936 in Liupanshui prefecture; historical names include Longjiazi 龙家子/龙架子 and Longgedou 龙格兜. Their autonym in Qianxi County is Xienan 写南, and Xiejing 写京 in Dafang County (Zhenxiong County Gazetteer 1987:447). In Xixiu District, Anshun, the Nanjingren are also called the Yingtian 应天. In Zhenxiong County, Yunnan, their autonyms include Awupu 阿乌浦 and Awudu 阿乌堵 (You 2013:134).
- Qixingmin 七姓民
- Shenzhou 神州: 4,000 (1999) people classified as Han, in Anshun Prefecture; has some non-Chinese loanwords
- Tunbao 屯堡: archaic Chinese dialect spoken in Anshun Prefecture. Long, et al. (2011) covers the Tunbao dialect of Jiuxi Village, Daxiqiao Township, Anshun (安顺市大西桥镇九溪村).

Miscellaneous ethnic groups of Guizhou
Group	Population	Official classification	Distribution
Liujia 六甲人	152	Han	Rongjiang County
Chenzhou 辰州人	-	Han	Pingtang County
Nanjing 南京人	61,171	Han	Bijie, Anshun, Liupanshui prefectures
Laba 喇叭	60,000+	Miao	Qinglong, Pu'an, Liuzhi, Shuicheng, Pan, Longli counties
Xijia 西家	9,000+	Miao	Kaili, Duyun, Majiang
Mojia 莫家	17,017	Buyi	Border region of Dushan and Libo counties
Qixingmin 七姓民	7,589	Bai	Shuicheng, Weining, Hezhang counties
Changpao Yao 长袍瑶, Youmairen 油迈人	300+	Yao	Libo, Wangmo counties
Lu 卢人	7,747	Manchu	Border region of Qianxi, Jinsha, Dafang counties
Yi, Yiren or Yizi and Gau 羿人, 羿子	1,015	Gelao / Han	Bijie Prefecture
Xialusi 下路司, Diao 刁人	984	Dong	Congjiang County
Sanqiao 三撬	2,374	Miao or Dong	Liping County
Limin 里民	70,000	Yi	Qinglong, Guanling, Zhenning, Shuicheng counties
Mulao 木佬	28,000	Mulao	Majiang, Duyun, Fuquan, Weng'an counties
Yanghuang 佯僙	40,000	Maonan	Pingtang, Dushan, Huishui, Luodian counties
Raojia 绕家	9,000+	Yao	Majiang, Duyun counties
Dongjia 东家	40,000+	She	Majiang, Kaili, Duyun, Fuquan counties
Longjia 龙家	10,000+	Bai	Bijie, Anshun, Liupanshui prefectures
Gejia 𱎼家	40,000		Huangping, Kaili, Guanling, Shibing counties
Caijia 蔡家	20,000		Qianxi, Bijie, Nayong, Hezhang, Zhijin, Shuicheng, Liuzhi counties
Chuanqing 穿青	600,000+	Han	Bijie, Anshun, Liupanshui precfectures

== See also ==
- Ethnic minorities in China
- Unrecognized ethnic groups in China
- Kam-Sui languages#Other languages
