= Qixingmin people =

Location of Guizhou, China

The Qixingmin (Chinese: 七姓民) are an officially unrecognized ethnic group of western Guizhou province, China. They are officially classified as Bai by the Chinese government. The Qixingmin speak a Yi (Loloish) language known as Luoji. The Guizhou Province Ethnic Gazetteer (2002:692) reports that, in 1982, there were about 700 speakers among the more easterly Qixingmin.

== Names ==
Qixingmin literally means "Seven Surname People" in Chinese. This is because the Qixingmin historically had the seven surnames of Zhang 张, Su 苏, Li 李, Zhao 赵, Xu 许, Qian 钱, and Yang 杨. In Guizhou, they are also known as:

- Baini 白尼
- Boren 僰人
- Luoju 罗苴
- Zhuoluoju 卓罗苴
- Baizi 白子
- Minjia 民家

In Zhaotong Prefecture, northeastern Yunnan, there is also an ethnic group known to the local Han Chinese as Bai'erzi 白儿子, and to the local Miao as Mudou 母斗.

Traditionally, the Qixingmin have also been considered an Yi subgroup. The Yi of the western extreme of Guizhou province have been divided into five subgroups, namely the Black Yi 黑彝, Red Yi 红彝, White Yi 白彝, Green Yi 青彝, and Luoju 罗苴 (a traditional name for the Qixingmin).

== Distribution ==
The Qixingmin are distributed in the following villages. According to the Guizhou Ethnic Gazetteer, several centuries ago the Qixingmin used to live primarily in Caohai 草海 of Weining County.

- Weining County (1,500 people as of 1982): Guala 瓜拉, Baodu 抱都, Jinshui 金水, Lushan 炉山, Kuadu 夸都, Jieli 结里, Kaiga 开嘎, Meihua 梅花, Caoping 草坪, Longchang 龙场, Xiushui 秀水, Yina 迤那, Mawo 麻窝, Yangjie 羊街, Shejie 蛇街, Yanjia 严家, Songlin 松林, Jinhai 金海, Xiaohai 小海, Sandaohe 三道河, Yancang 盐仓, Sifu 四甫, Yaodian 幺店, Chengguan 城关. Small numbers in the Banliang Mountains 半凉山 area of Caohai Township 草海镇 (Weining County Gazetteer 1994:114). Also possibly in Ningxia Township 宁下乡 and Xiangshui Village 响水村.
- Hezhang County (407 people as of 1982): in Qingshan 青山 and Xinfa 新发 of Gemoye Mountain 各摩野山, Wumeng Mountain Range 乌蒙山脉

Also, the Nanjingren 南京人 of Hezhang County are called Awutu 阿武吐 by the local Yi (Hezhang County Gazetteer 2001).

Qixingmin of the following surnames are distributed in (Guizhou Ethnic Gazetteer 2002:690):

- Zhang 张: Shejie 蛇街, Yangjie 羊街, Jieli 结里, Sandaohe 三道河, Yaodian 幺店, Jinzhong 金钟, Jinhai 金海
- Su 苏: Xiaohai 小海, Yanjia 严家
- Li 李: Shejie 蛇街, Jinhai 金海, Jinzhong 金钟
- Zhao 赵: Shejie 蛇街, Baodu 抱都

== Language ==
The Qixingmin speak the Luoji language. It is closely related to the local Yi language, which is intermediate between the Western and Eastern Yi dialects of Weining County (Weining 1997:328).

== See also ==
- Bo people (China)
- Longjia people
- List of unrecognized ethnic groups of Guizhou
