= Nayong County =

Nayong County 纳雍县
- County
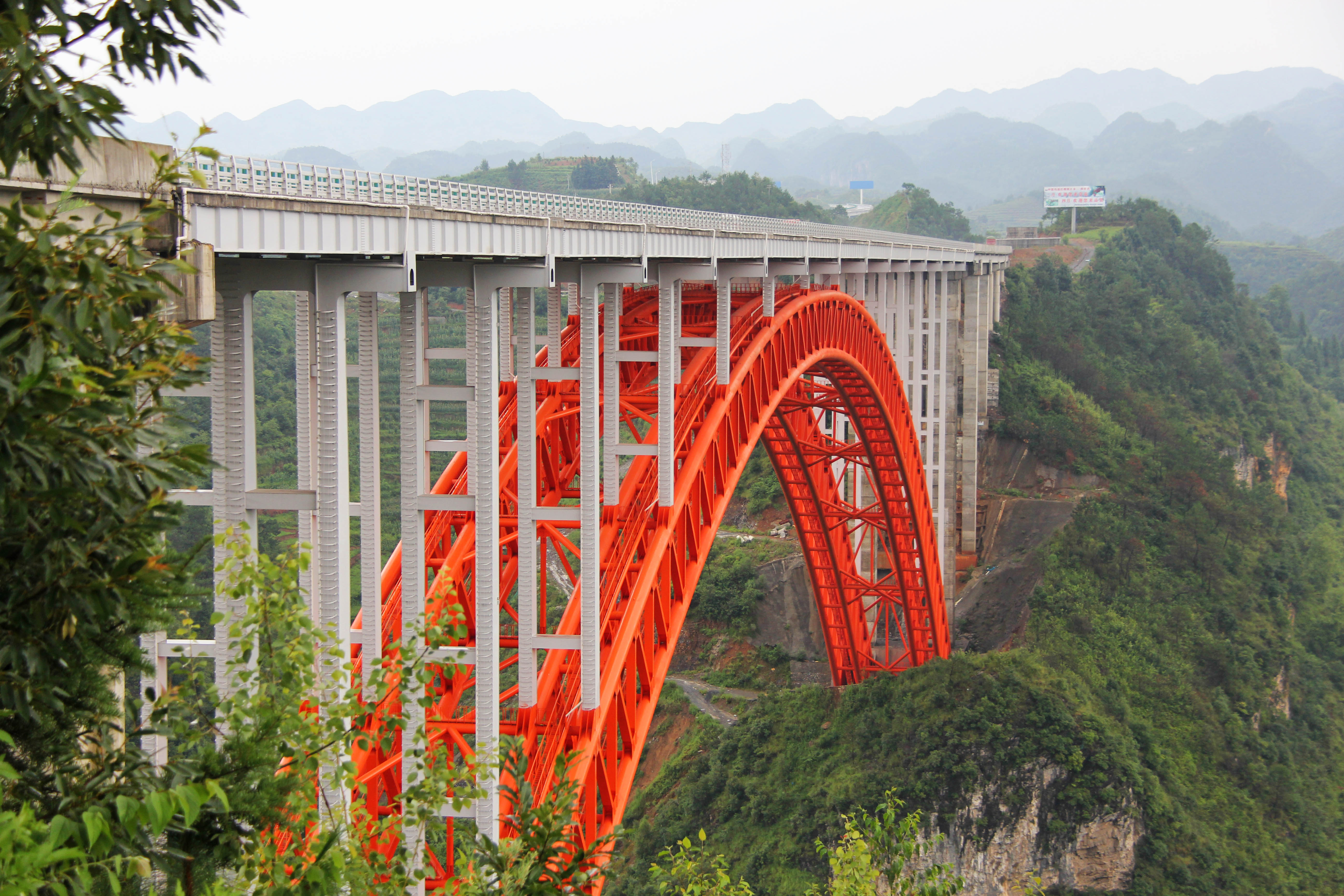

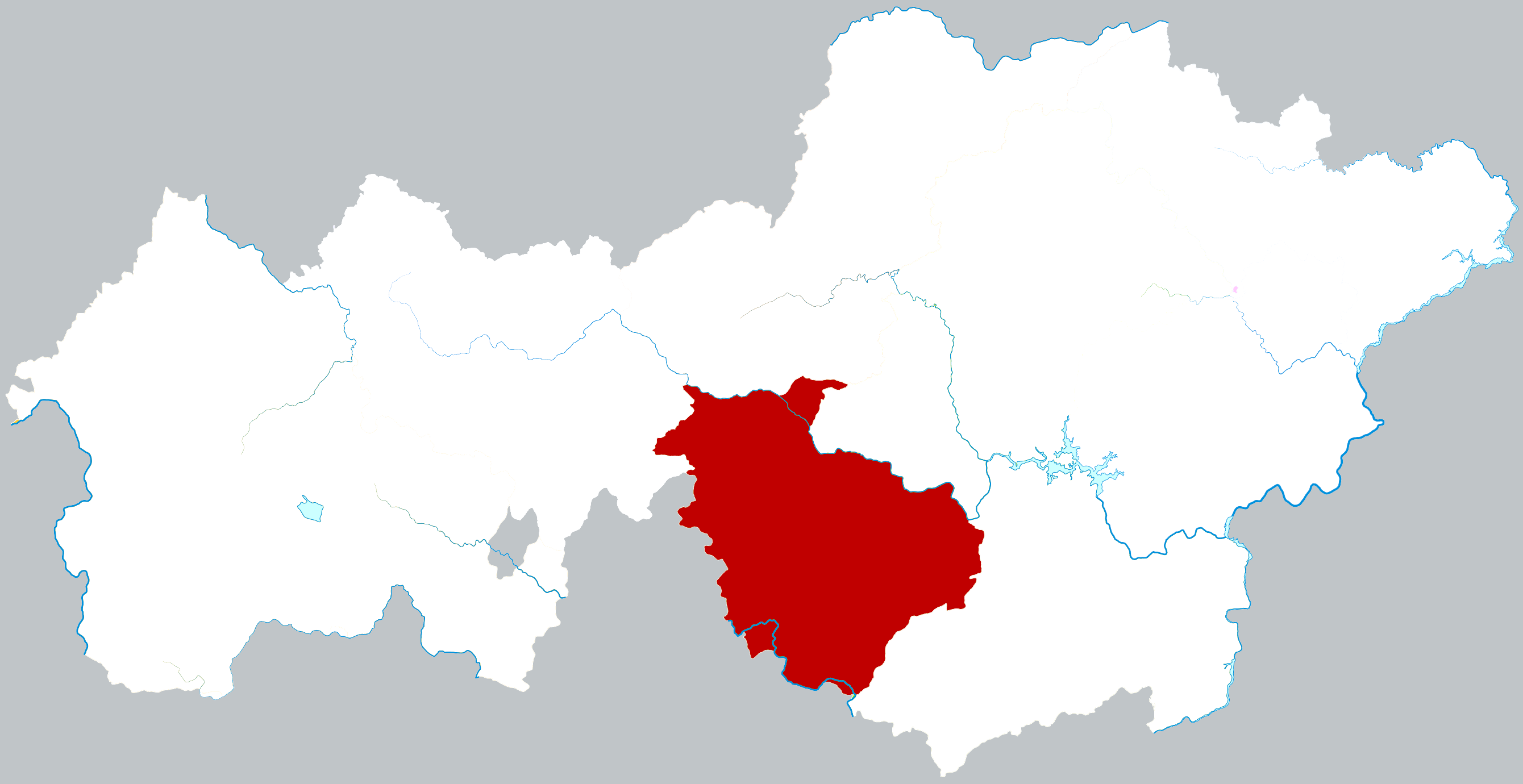
- Nayong in Bijie

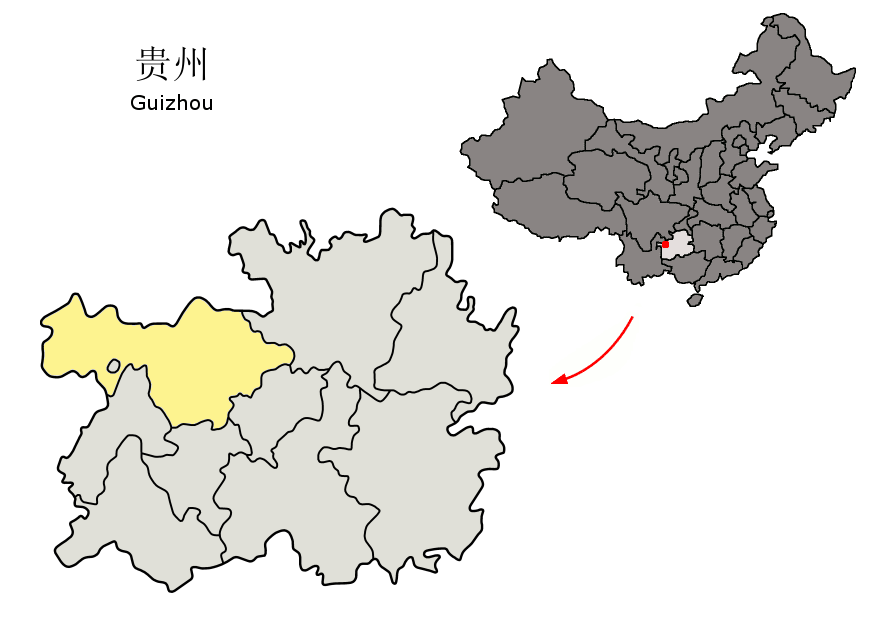
- Bijie in Guizhou
- Coordinates (Nayong County government): 26°46′45″N 105°24′53″E
- Country: China
- Province: Guizhou
- Prefecture-level city: Bijie
- County seat: Yongxi

Area
  - Total: 2,452.32 km^{2} (946.85 sq mi)

Population (2016)
  - Total: 1,081,429
  - Density: 440.982/km^{2} (1,142.14/sq mi)
- Time zone: UTC+8 (China Standard)

Nayong County (simplified Chinese: 纳雍县; traditional Chinese: 納雍縣; pinyin: Nàyōng Xiàn) is a county in the west of Guizhou province, China. It is under the administration of Bijie city. It is rich in natural resources: coal, lead, zinc, marble, sulfur, iron, fluorite, dolomite, limestone and others. A significant portion of Guizhou's coal production is extracted in Nayong. Nayong's marble is famous in China, and the annual production is 1,400,000 cubic metres (49,000,000 cu ft). For agriculture, timber, tobacco, walnut and tea are some products of importance. In 2016, the total GDP was CN¥ 18,900,000,000, with a GDP per capita of CN¥ 27,843.

== Administrative divisions ==
Nayong is partitioned in the following 3 subdistricts, 13 towns and 10 ethnic townships:

subdistricts

- Yongxi Subdistrict (雍熙街道)
- Wenchang Subdistrict (文昌街道)
- Juren Subdistrict (居仁街道)

towns

- Zongling Town (鬃岭镇)
- Yangchang Town (阳长镇)
- Weixin Town (维新镇)
- Longchang Town (龙场镇)
- Lezhi Town (乐治镇)
- Baixing Town (百兴镇)
- Zhangjiawan Town (张家湾镇)
- Yulongba Town (玉龙坝镇)
- Shuguang Town (曙光镇)
- Shuidong Town (水东镇)
- Shaobao Town (沙包镇)
- Zhaile Town (寨乐镇)
- Shaowo Town (勺窝镇)

ethnic townships

- Xinfang Yi and Miao Ethnic Township (新房彝族苗族乡)
- Shedongguan Yi, Miao and Bai Ethnic Township (厍东关彝族苗族白族乡)
- Dongdi Miao and Yi Ethnic Township (董地苗族彝族乡)
- Huazuo Miao and Yi Ethnic Township (化作苗族彝族乡)
- Gukai Miao and Yi Ethnic Township (姑开苗族彝族乡)
- Yangchang Miao and Yi Ethnic Township (羊场苗族彝族乡)
- Guoquanyan Miao and Yi Ethnic Township (锅圈岩苗族彝族乡)
- Kunzhai Miao, Yi and Bai Ethnic Township (昆寨苗族彝族白族乡)
- Zuojiujia Yi and Miao Ethnic Township (左鸠戛彝族苗族乡)
- Zhuchang Miao and Yi Ethnic Township (猪场苗族彝族乡)

== Climate ==
Climate data for Nayong, elevation 1,457 m (4,780 ft), (1991–2020 normals, extremes 1981–2010)
Month	Jan	Feb	Mar	Apr	May	Jun	Jul	Aug	Sep	Oct	Nov	Dec	Year
Record high °C (°F)	23.5 (74.3)	30.1 (86.2)	34.1 (93.4)	33.4 (92.1)	33.9 (93.0)	33.2 (91.8)	33.0 (91.4)	32.6 (90.7)	32.9 (91.2)	28.9 (84.0)	26.9 (80.4)	22.1 (71.8)	34.1 (93.4)
Mean daily maximum °C (°F)	7.7 (45.9)	11.1 (52.0)	15.9 (60.6)	20.9 (69.6)	23.4 (74.1)	24.9 (76.8)	27.0 (80.6)	26.9 (80.4)	23.8 (74.8)	18.7 (65.7)	15.2 (59.4)	9.6 (49.3)	18.8 (65.8)
Daily mean °C (°F)	3.9 (39.0)	6.4 (43.5)	10.5 (50.9)	15.2 (59.4)	18.3 (64.9)	20.4 (68.7)	22.1 (71.8)	21.5 (70.7)	18.8 (65.8)	14.6 (58.3)	10.6 (51.1)	5.6 (42.1)	14.0 (57.2)
Mean daily minimum °C (°F)	1.6 (34.9)	3.5 (38.3)	7.0 (44.6)	11.4 (52.5)	14.5 (58.1)	17.3 (63.1)	18.8 (65.8)	18.0 (64.4)	15.6 (60.1)	12.1 (53.8)	7.7 (45.9)	3.2 (37.8)	10.9 (51.6)
Record low °C (°F)	−7.6 (18.3)	−4.8 (23.4)	−4.3 (24.3)	0.6 (33.1)	4.8 (40.6)	9.4 (48.9)	9.3 (48.7)	10.8 (51.4)	6.2 (43.2)	2.4 (36.3)	−3.3 (26.1)	−7.5 (18.5)	−7.6 (18.3)
Average precipitation mm (inches)	29.8 (1.17)	21.1 (0.83)	36.2 (1.43)	67.2 (2.65)	139.4 (5.49)	229.6 (9.04)	223.3 (8.79)	154.4 (6.08)	140.3 (5.52)	101.3 (3.99)	34.1 (1.34)	23.5 (0.93)	1,200.2 (47.26)
Average precipitation days (≥ 0.1 mm)	20.1	17.1	16.8	17.3	18.0	19.6	16.7	15.8	14.3	19.1	14.5	17.5	206.8
Average snowy days	5.3	3.4	0.5	0	0	0	0	0	0	0	0.3	2.2	11.7
Average relative humidity (%)	86	82	78	76	76	81	80	80	81	85	83	85	81
Mean monthly sunshine hours	56.8	75.5	108.5	134.3	132.6	105.8	158.3	167.3	128.6	78.1	90.3	63.1	1,299.2
Percentage possible sunshine	17	24	29	35	32	26	38	42	35	22	28	19	29
Source: China Meteorological Administration

== Demographics ==
The total population is a little over 1 million people as of 2016 with a male to female ratio of 1.07:1. The urban population was 242,379 people. Nayong is home to at least 29 ethnic minorities such as Miao, Yi, Bai, Buyi, Hui, Dong and Zhuang.

== Transportation ==
- G76 Xiamen–Chengdu Expressway
- G56 Hangzhou–Ruili Expressway

Nayong has a railway station on the Zhijin to Liupanshui railroad, which was completed in 2015.
