= Zhijin County =

Zhijin County 织金县
- County
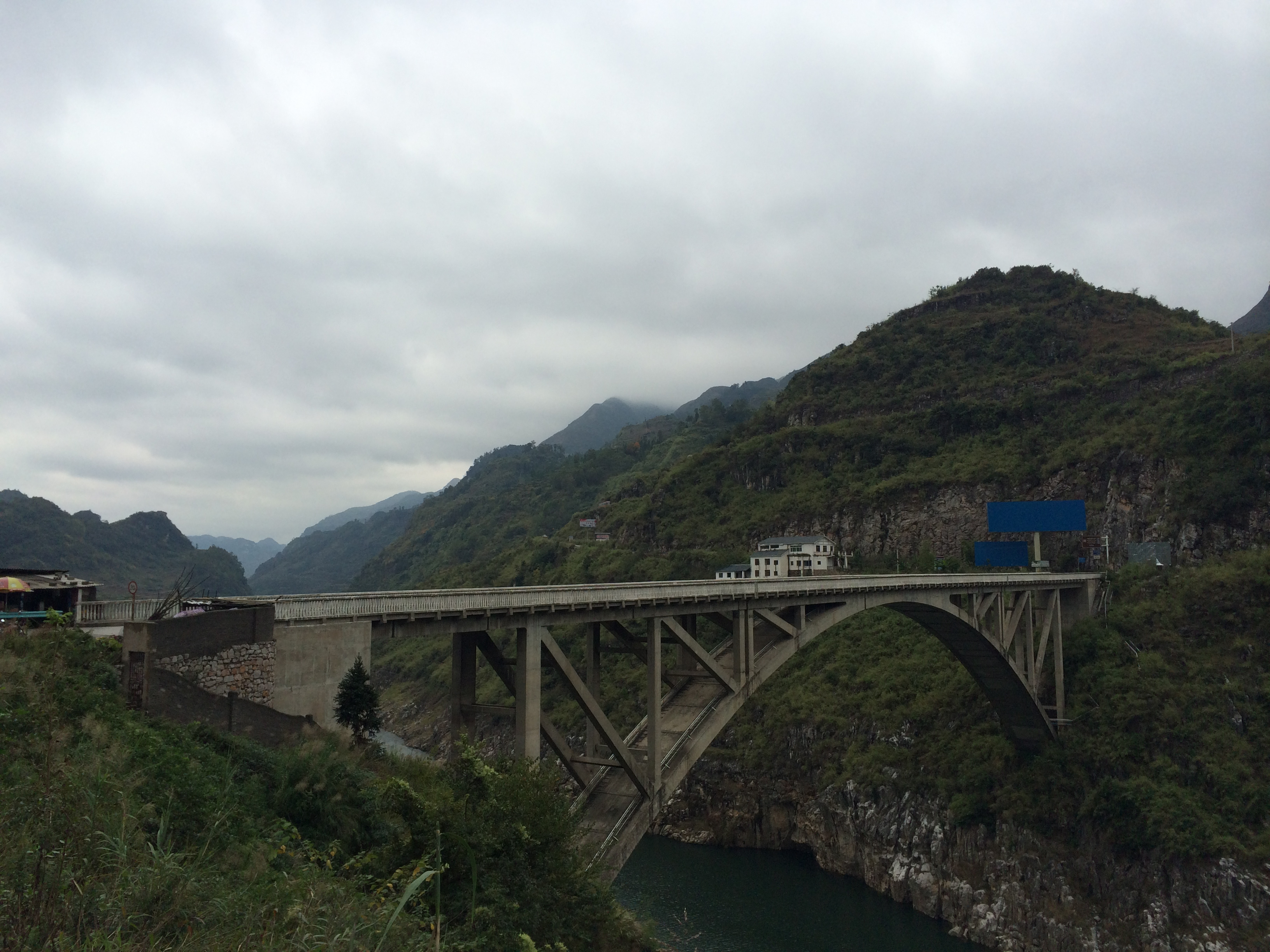

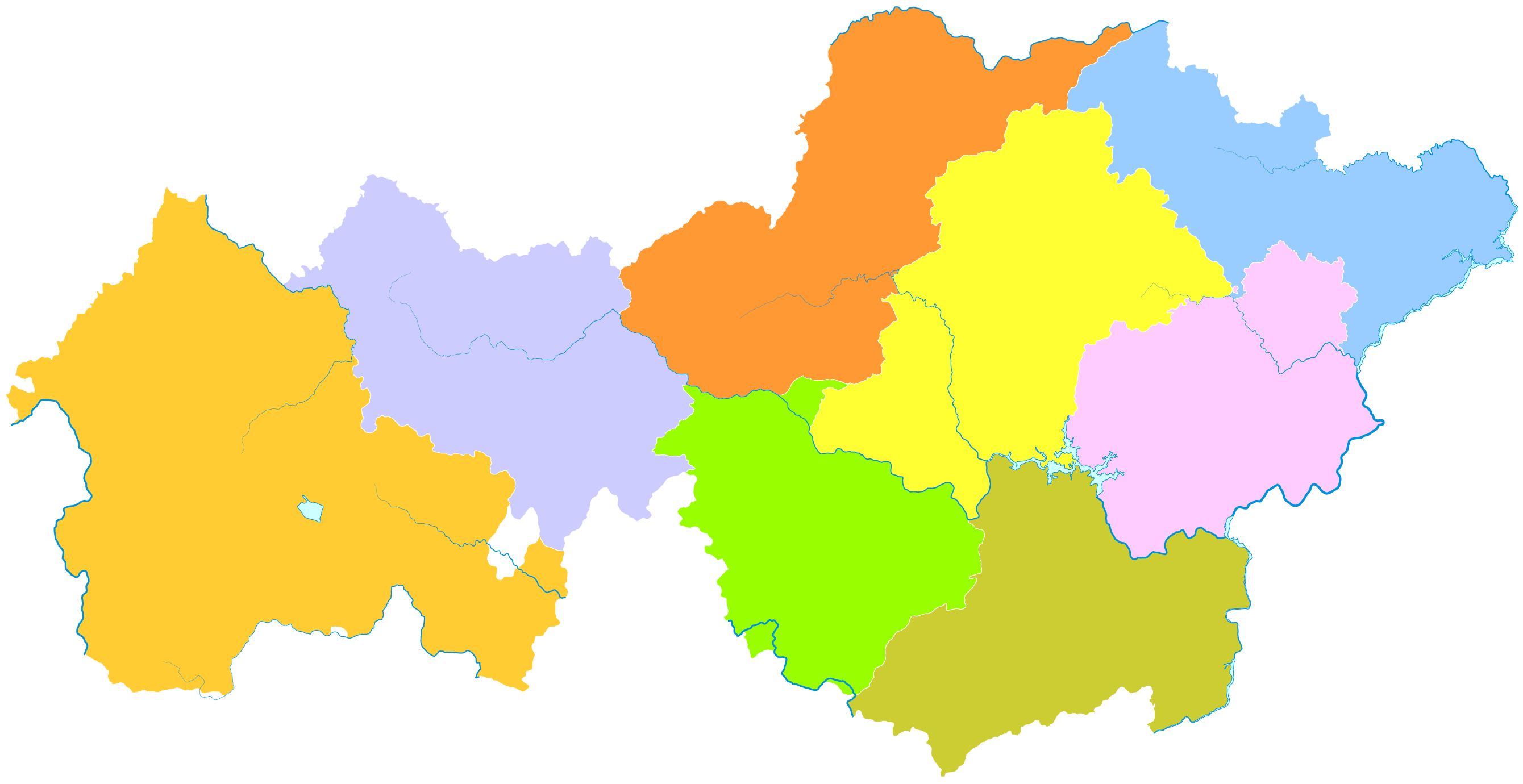
- Zhijin is the southernmost division in this map of Bijie

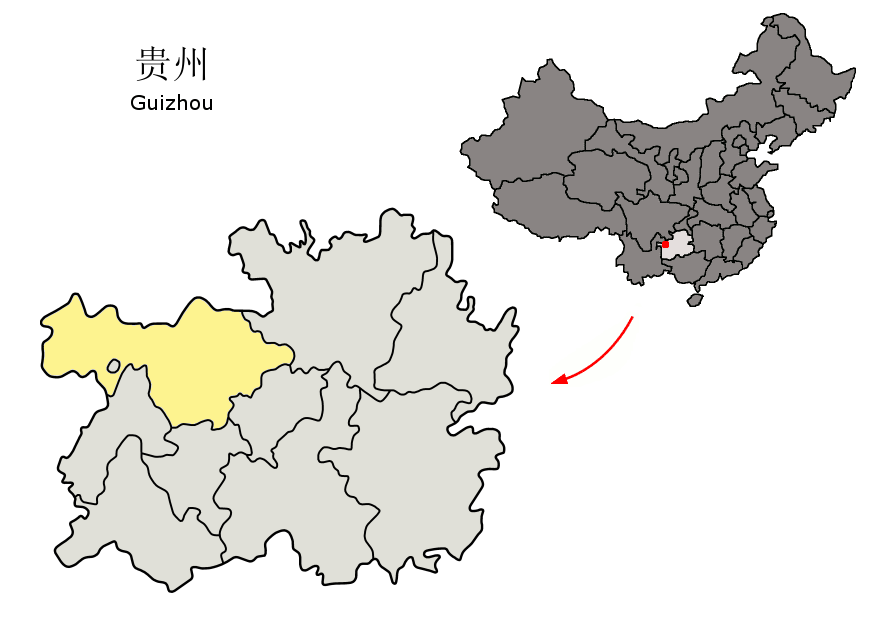
- Bijie in Guizhou
- Coordinates (Zhijin County government): 26°39′49″N 105°46′13″E
- Country: China
- Province: Guizhou
- Prefecture-level city: Bijie
- County seat: Wenteng

Area
  - Total: 2,865.26 km^{2} (1,106.28 sq mi)

Population (2010)
  - Total: 784,119
  - Density: 273.664/km^{2} (708.787/sq mi)
- Time zone: UTC+8 (China Standard)

Zhijin County
- Traditional Chinese: 織金縣
- Simplified Chinese: 织金县
- Literal meaning: Gold-Weaving County
Transcriptions
Standard Mandarin
- Hanyu Pinyin: Zhījīnxiàn
- Wade–Giles: Chih-chin Hsien

Former names
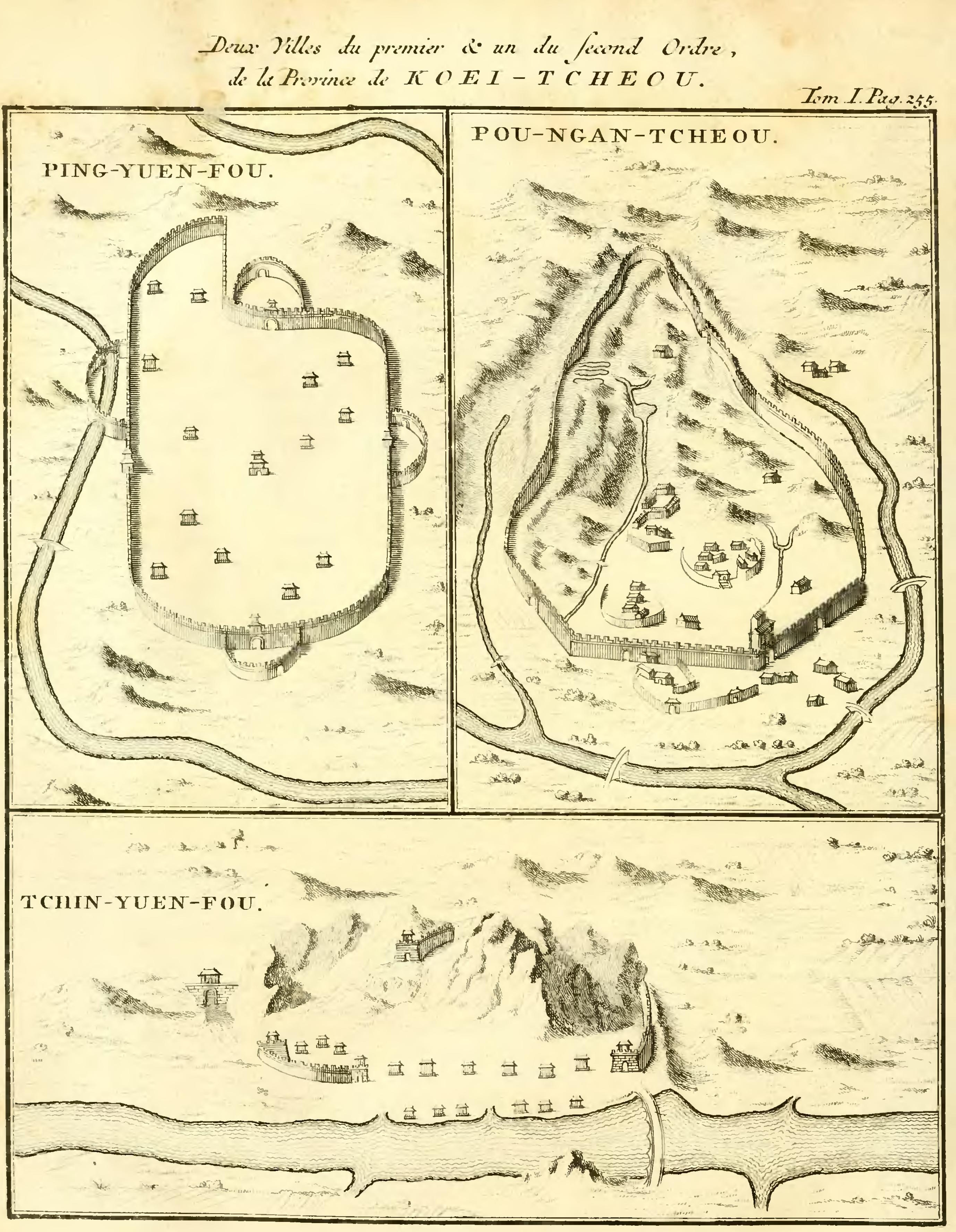
- "Ping-yuen-fou" and 2 other towns of "Koei-tcheou" from Du Halde's 1736 Description of China, based on reports from Jesuit missionaries

Pingyuan Prefecture
- Traditional Chinese: 平遠府
- Simplified Chinese: 平远府
- Literal meaning: Peaceful-&-Distant Prefecture; Pacified-&-Distant Prefecture
Transcriptions
Standard Mandarin
- Hanyu Pinyin: Píngyuǎnfǔ
- Wade–Giles: Pʻing-yüan Fu

Zhijin County is a county under the administration of the prefecture-level city of Bijie in west-central Guizhou province, China.

== History ==
Zhijin has been inhabited since the Qin, populated mainly by the Gelao. After the Jin, the Yi moved in. During the Kangxi Era of the Qing, a city was founded named Pingyuan. In 1914, it was renamed Zhijin after one of its streets.

== Administrative divisions ==
Zhijin County is divided into 6 subdistricts, 16 towns, 3 townships and 7 ethnic townships:

subdistricts

- Shuangyan Subdistrict 双堰街道
- Wenteng Subdistrict 文腾街道
- Jinfeng Subdistrict 金凤街道
- Babu Subdistrict 八步街道
- Qimo Subdistrict 绮陌街道
- Sanjiajie Subdistrict 三甲街道

townships

- Shixing Township 实兴乡
- Shangpingzhai Township 上坪寨乡
- Nayong Township 纳雍乡

towns

- Guiguo Town 桂果镇
- Niuchang Town 牛场镇
- Maochang Town 猫场镇
- Huaqi Town 化起镇
- Longchang Town 龙场镇
- Yina Town 以那镇
- Santang Town 三塘镇
- Agong Town 阿弓镇
- Zhucang Town 珠藏镇
- Machang Town 马场镇
- Shaopu Town 少普镇
- Xiongjiachang Town 熊家场镇
- Baini Town 白泥镇
- Heitu Town 黑土镇
- Banqiao Town 板桥镇
- Zhongzhai Town 中寨镇

ethnic townships

- Ziqiang Miao Ethnic Township 自强苗族乡
- Daping Miao and Yi Ethnic Township 大平苗族彝族乡
- Guanzhai Miao Ethnic Township 官寨苗族乡
- Chadian Bouyei, Miao and Yi Ethnic Township 茶店布依族苗族彝族乡
- Jinlong Miao, Yi and Bouyei Ethnic Township 金龙苗族彝族布依族乡
- Houzhai Miao Ethnic Township 后寨苗族乡
- Jichang Miao, Yi and Bouyei Ethnic Township 鸡场苗族彝族布依族乡

== Geography ==
Zhijin County is located in the southeastern part of Bijie City, roughly in the middle of Guizhou province. It is 151 km from Guiyang, 95 km from Anshun, and 129 km from Bijie City. It spans 82.5 km from East to West, and 66 km from North to South. Its total area is 2,868 km^{2} (1,107 sq mi).

Karst topography dominates the landscape, with caves everywhere. The Zhijin Cave 22 km from the county seat is considered the most magnificent cave in China, and is a popular tourist spot.

The highest point in the county has altitude 2262 m, and the lowest 1319 m.

=== Climate ===
The average temperature is 14.7 c, with annual rainfall 1391 mm.

Climate data for Zhijin, elevation 1,319 m (4,327 ft), (1991–2020 normals, extremes 1981–2010)
Month	Jan	Feb	Mar	Apr	May	Jun	Jul	Aug	Sep	Oct	Nov	Dec	Year
Record high °C (°F)	21.7 (71.1)	29.5 (85.1)	32.2 (90.0)	32.8 (91.0)	34.0 (93.2)	32.6 (90.7)	32.7 (90.9)	33.2 (91.8)	32.4 (90.3)	29.9 (85.8)	26.0 (78.8)	22.0 (71.6)	34.0 (93.2)
Mean daily maximum °C (°F)	7.8 (46.0)	11.1 (52.0)	15.8 (60.4)	20.9 (69.6)	23.6 (74.5)	25.2 (77.4)	27.1 (80.8)	27.4 (81.3)	24.2 (75.6)	18.9 (66.0)	15.4 (59.7)	9.9 (49.8)	18.9 (66.1)
Daily mean °C (°F)	4.6 (40.3)	7.0 (44.6)	11.0 (51.8)	15.8 (60.4)	18.8 (65.8)	21.0 (69.8)	22.8 (73.0)	22.4 (72.3)	19.6 (67.3)	15.2 (59.4)	11.3 (52.3)	6.4 (43.5)	14.7 (58.4)
Mean daily minimum °C (°F)	2.4 (36.3)	4.3 (39.7)	7.9 (46.2)	12.2 (54.0)	15.3 (59.5)	18.0 (64.4)	19.7 (67.5)	19.1 (66.4)	16.5 (61.7)	12.8 (55.0)	8.6 (47.5)	4.0 (39.2)	11.7 (53.1)
Record low °C (°F)	−5.1 (22.8)	−4.2 (24.4)	−3.7 (25.3)	1.9 (35.4)	6.3 (43.3)	9.9 (49.8)	10.1 (50.2)	12.3 (54.1)	6.7 (44.1)	1.9 (35.4)	−2.2 (28.0)	−5.9 (21.4)	−5.9 (21.4)
Average precipitation mm (inches)	28.8 (1.13)	20.4 (0.80)	34.7 (1.37)	82.0 (3.23)	172.9 (6.81)	297.8 (11.72)	268.5 (10.57)	179.5 (7.07)	140.8 (5.54)	108.4 (4.27)	34.3 (1.35)	22.9 (0.90)	1,391 (54.76)
Average precipitation days (≥ 0.1 mm)	18.9	16.2	16.4	16.5	18.4	19.6	17.2	14.8	13.5	18.7	13.7	15.7	199.6
Average snowy days	4.9	2.7	0.5	0	0	0	0	0	0	0	0.1	1.6	9.8
Average relative humidity (%)	85	81	78	76	76	81	80	79	80	83	81	82	80
Mean monthly sunshine hours	37.2	56.1	89.1	117.2	121.5	91.9	146.6	161.5	114.6	65.9	69.9	47.0	1,118.5
Percentage possible sunshine	11	18	24	30	29	22	35	40	31	19	22	14	25
Source: China Meteorological Administration

== Economy ==
The most important industry is tourism, with Zhijin Cave the number one attraction drawing tourists from all over China and the world.

== Demographics ==
There are 23 ethnic groups living in Zhijin, including Han Chinese, Miao, Yi, Hui and Buyei. 48.02% of Zhijin's population are considered minorities in China.
