= ISO 639:g =

List of ISO 639-3 language codes starting with G

This is a list of ISO 639-3 language codes starting with G.

Index | a | b | c | d | e | f | g | h | i | j | k | l | m | n | o | p | q | r | s | t | u | v | w | x | y | z

Abbreviations are used in the table as follows:

- Scope: I = individual language, M = macrolanguage, S = special code
- Type: C = constructed, E = extinct (in recent times), H = historical (distinct from its modern form), L = living, S = special code

Deprecated codes are enclosed in (parentheses).

The column Family contains the generic English name of the language's family or macrolanguage.

ISO 639 codes			Scope/Type	Family	Language names	
639-3	639-1	639-2/B	Scope/Type	Family	Native	ISO name
gaa		gaa	I/L		Gã	Ga
gab			I/L			Gabri
gac			I/L			Mixed Great Andamanese
gad			I/L			Gaddang
gae			I/L			Guarequena
gaf			I/L			Gende
gag			I/L	Turkic	Gagauz dili	Gagauz
gah			I/L			Alekano
gai			I/L			Borei
gaj			I/L			Gadsup
gak			I/L			Gamkonora
gal			I/L			Galolen
gam			I/L			Kandawo
gan			I/L	Sino-Tibetan	赣语	Gan Chinese
gao			I/L			Gants
gap			I/L			Gal
gaq			I/L			Gata'
gar			I/L			Galeya
gas			I/L			Adiwasi Garasia
gat			I/L			Kenati
gau			I/L			Mudhili Gadaba
(gav)			I/L			Gabutamon
gaw			I/L			Nobonob
gax			I/L			Borana-Arsi-Guji Oromo
gay		gay	I/L			Gayo
gaz			I/L			West Central Oromo
gba		gba	M/L			Gbaya (Central African Republic)
gbb			I/L			Kaytetye
(gbc)			I/L			Garawa
gbd			I/L			Karajarri
gbe			I/L			Niksek
gbf			I/L			Gaikundi
gbg			I/L			Gbanziri
gbh			I/L			Defi Gbe
gbi			I/L			Galela
gbj			I/L			Bodo Gadaba
gbk			I/L			Gaddi
gbl			I/L			Gamit
gbm			I/L			Garhwali
gbn			I/L			Mo'da
gbo			I/L			Northern Grebo
gbp			I/L	Niger–Congo?		Gbaya-Bossangoa
gbq			I/L			Gbaya-Bozoum
gbr			I/L			Gbagyi
gbs			I/L			Gbesi Gbe
gbu			I/L			Gagadu
gbv			I/L			Gbanu
gbw			I/L			Gabi-Gabi
gbx			I/L			Eastern Xwla Gbe
gby			I/L			Gbari
gbz			I/L		دَرِي	Zoroastrian Dari
gcc			I/L			Mali
gcd			I/E			Ganggalida
gce			I/E			Galice
gcf			I/L			Guadeloupean Creole French
gcl			I/L			Grenadian Creole English
gcn			I/L			Gaina
gcr			I/L			Guianese Creole French
gct			I/L			Colonia Tovar German
gda			I/L			Gade Lohar
gdb			I/L			Pottangi Ollar Gadaba
gdc			I/E			Gugu Badhun
gdd			I/L			Gedaged
gde			I/L			Gude
gdf			I/L			Guduf-Gava
gdg			I/L			Ga'dang
gdh			I/L			Gadjerawang; Gajirrabeng
gdi			I/L			Gundi
gdj			I/L			Gurdjar
gdk			I/L			Gadang
gdl			I/L			Dirasha
gdm			I/L	language isolate	yəw láà:l	Laal
gdn			I/L			Umanakaina
gdo			I/L			Ghodoberi
gdq			I/L			Mehri
gdr			I/L			Wipi
gds			I/L			Ghandruk Sign Language
gdt			I/E			Kungardutyi
gdu			I/L			Gudu
gdx			I/L			Godwari
gea			I/L			Geruma
geb			I/L			Kire
gec			I/L			Gboloo Grebo
ged			I/L			Gade
gef			I/L			Gerai
geg			I/L			Gengle
geh			I/L		Hutterisch	Hutterisch; Hutterite German
gei			I/L			Gebe
gej			I/L			Gen
gek			I/L			Ywom
gel			I/L			ut-Ma'in
(gen)			I/L			Geman Deng
geq			I/L			Geme
ges			I/L			Geser-Gorom
gev			I/L	Niger–Congo		Eviya
gew			I/L			Gera
gex			I/L			Garre
gey			I/L			Enya
gez		gez	I/H		ግዕዝ	Geez
gfk			I/L			Patpatar
gft			I/E			Gafat
(gfx)			I/L			Mangetti Dune ǃXung
gga			I/L			Gao
ggb			I/L			Gbii
ggd			I/E			Gugadj
gge			I/L			Gurr-goni
ggg			I/L			Gurgula
(ggh)			I/L	spurious language		Garreh-Ajuran
ggk			I/E			Kungarakany
ggl			I/L			Ganglau
(ggm)			I/E	spurious language		Gugu Mini
(ggn)			I/L			Eastern Gurung
(ggo)			I/L			Southern Gondi
(ggr)			I/E			Aghu Tharnggalu
ggt			I/L			Gitua
ggu			I/L			Gagu; Gban
ggw			I/L			Gogodala
gha			I/L			Ghadamès
ghc			I/H			Hiberno-Scottish Gaelic
ghe			I/L			Southern Ghale
ghh			I/L			Northern Ghale
ghk			I/L			Geko Karen
ghl			I/L			Ghulfan
ghn			I/L			Ghanongga
gho			I/L	Afro-Asiatic	Ghomara	Ghomara
ghr			I/L			Ghera
ghs			I/L			Guhu-Samane
ght			I/L			Kuke; Kutang Ghale
gia			I/L			Kija
gib			I/L			Gibanawa
gic			I/L			Gail
gid			I/L			Gidar
gie			I/L	Niger–Congo		Gaɓogbo; Guébie
gig			I/L			Goaria
gih			I/L			Githabul
gii			I/L	Afro-Asiatic		Girirra
gil		gil	I/L		taetae ni Kiribati	Gilbertese
gim			I/L			Gimi (Eastern Highlands)
gin			I/L			Hinukh
(gio)			I/L			Gelao
gip			I/L			Gimi (West New Britain)
giq			I/L			Green Gelao
gir			I/L			Red Gelao
gis			I/L			North Giziga
git			I/L		Gitx̱sanimx̱	Gitxsan
giu			I/L			Mulao
giw			I/L			White Gelao
gix			I/L			Gilima
giy			I/L			Giyug
giz			I/L			South Giziga
(gji)			I/L			Geji
gjk			I/L			Kachi Koli
gjm			I/E			Gunditjmara
gjn			I/L			Gonja
gjr			I/L			Gurindji Kriol
gju			I/L			Gujari
gka			I/L			Guya
gkd			I/L	Trans–New Guinea		Magɨ (Madang Province)
gke			I/L			Ndai
gkn			I/L			Gokana
gko			I/E			Kok-Nar
gkp			I/L			Guinea Kpelle
gku			I/E	Tuu		ǂUngkue
gla	gd	gla	I/L	Indo-European	Gàidhlig	Gaelic; Scottish Gaelic
glb			I/L	Afro-Asiatic		Belning
glc			I/L			Bon Gula
gld			I/L		нанай	Nanai
gle	ga	gle	I/L	Indo-European	Gaeilge	Irish
glg	gl	glg	I/L	Indo-European	galego	Galician
glh			I/L			Northwest Pashai; Northwest Pashayi
(gli)			I/E			Guliguli
glj			I/L			Gula Iro
glk			I/L			Gilaki
gll			I/E			Garlali
glo			I/L			Galambu
glr			I/L			Glaro-Twabo
glu			I/L			Gula (Chad)
glv	gv	glv	I/L	Indo-European	Gaelg	Manx
glw			I/L			Glavda
gly			I/E			Gule
gma			I/E			Gambera
gmb			I/L			Gula'alaa
gmd			I/L			Mághdì
gmg			I/L	Trans–New Guinea		Magɨyi
gmh		gmh	I/H			Middle High German (ca. 1050–1500)
gml			I/H	Indo-European	sassesche sprâke	Middle Low German
gmm			I/L			Gbaya-Mbodomo
gmn			I/L			Gimnime
(gmo)			I/L			Gamo-Gofa-Dawro
gmr			I/L			Mirning; Mirniny
gmu			I/L			Gumalu
gmv			I/L			Gamo
gmx			I/L			Magoma
gmy			I/H			Mycenaean Greek
gmz			I/L			Mgbolizhia
gna			I/L			Kaansa
gnb			I/L			Gangte
gnc			I/E			Guanche
gnd			I/L			Zulgo-Gemzek
gne			I/L			Ganang
gng			I/L			Ngangam
gnh			I/L			Lere
gni			I/L			Gooniyandi
gnj			I/L	Mande		Ngen
gnk			I/L			ǁGana
gnl			I/E			Gangulu
gnm			I/L			Ginuman
gnn			I/L			Gumatj
gno			I/L			Northern Gondi
gnq			I/L			Gana
gnr			I/E			Gureng Gureng
gnt			I/L			Guntai
gnu			I/L			Gnau
gnw			I/L			Western Bolivian Guaraní
gnz			I/L			Ganzi
goa			I/L			Guro
gob			I/L			Playero
goc			I/L			Gorakor
god			I/L			Godié
goe			I/L	Sino-Tibetan	དགོང་འདུས་	Gongduk
gof			I/L			Gofa
gog			I/L			Gogo
goh		goh	I/H	Indo-European	diutisk	Old High German (ca. 750–1050)
goi			I/L			Gobasi
goj			I/L			Gowlan
gok			I/L			Gowli
gol			I/L			Gola
gom			I/L	Indo-European	कोंकणी; ಕೊಂಕಣಿ; Konknni	Goan Konkani
gon		gon	M/L			Gondi
goo			I/L			Gone Dau
gop			I/L			Yeretuar
goq			I/L			Gorap
gor		gor	I/L			Gorontalo
gos			I/L			Gronings
got		got	I/H			Gothic
gou			I/L			Gavar
gov			I/L	Niger–Congo		Goo
gow			I/L			Gorowa
gox			I/L			Gobu
goy			I/L			Goundo
goz			I/L			Gozarkhani
gpa			I/L			Gupa-Abawa
gpe			I/L			Ghanaian Pidgin English
gpn			I/L			Taiap
gqa			I/L			Ga'anda
gqi			I/L			Guiqiong
gqn			I/E			Guana (Brazil)
gqr			I/L			Gor
gqu			I/L			Qau
gra			I/L			Rajput Garasia
grb		grb	M/L			Grebo
grc		grc	I/H		ἑλληνικά	Ancient Greek (to 1453)
grd			I/L			Guruntum-Mbaaru
grg			I/L			Madi
grh			I/L			Gbiri-Niragu
gri			I/L			Ghari
grj			I/L			Southern Grebo
grm			I/L			Kota Marudu Talantang
grn	gn	grn	M/L	Tupian	Avañe'ẽ	Guarani
gro			I/L			Groma
grq			I/L			Gorovu
grr			I/L			Taznatit
grs			I/L			Gresi
grt			I/L	Sino-Tibetan	A·chikku	Garo
gru			I/L			Kistane
grv			I/L			Central Grebo
grw			I/L			Gweda
grx			I/L			Guriaso
gry			I/L			Barclayville Grebo
grz			I/L			Guramalum
(gsc)			I/L			Gascon
gse			I/L			Ghanaian Sign Language
gsg			I/L			German Sign Language
gsl			I/L			Gusilay
gsm			I/L			Guatemalan Sign Language
gsn			I/L			Gusan; Nema
gso			I/L			Southwest Gbaya
gsp			I/L			Wasembo
gss			I/L			Greek Sign Language
gsw		gsw	I/L	Indo-European	Alemannisch, Schwyzerdütsch, Elsassisch	Alemannic, Alsatian, Swiss German
gta			I/L			Guató
(gti)			I/L			Gbati-ri
gtu			I/E			Aghu-Tharnggala
gua			I/L			Shiki
gub			I/L			Guajajára
guc			I/L			Wayuu
gud			I/L			Yocoboué Dida
gue			I/L			Gurindji
guf			I/L			Gupapuyngu
gug			I/L			Paraguayan Guaraní
guh			I/L			Guahibo
gui			I/L			Eastern Bolivian Guaraní
guj	gu	guj	I/L	Indo-European	ગુજરાતી	Gujarati
guk			I/L			Gumuz
gul			I/L			Sea Island Creole English
gum			I/L			Guambiano
gun			I/L			Mbyá Guaraní
guo			I/L			Guayabero
gup			I/L			Gunwinggu
guq			I/L			Aché
gur			I/L			Farefare
gus			I/L			Guinean Sign Language
gut			I/L			Maléku Jaíka
guu			I/L			Yanomamö
(guv)			I/E			Gey
guw			I/L			Gun
gux			I/L			Gourmanchéma
guz			I/L			Ekegusii; Gusii
gva			I/L			Guana (Paraguay)
gvc			I/L			Guanano
gve			I/L			Duwet
gvf			I/L			Golin
gvj			I/L			Guajá
gvl			I/L			Gulay
gvm			I/L			Gurmana
gvn			I/L			Kuku-Yalanji
gvo			I/L			Gavião Do Jiparaná
gvp			I/L			Pará Gavião
gvr			I/L			Gurung
gvs			I/L			Gumawana
gvy			I/E			Guyani
gwa			I/L			Mbato
gwb			I/L			Gwa
gwc			I/L			Gawri; Kalami
gwd			I/L			Gawwada
gwe			I/L			Gweno
gwf			I/L			Gowro
gwg			I/L			Moo
gwi		gwi	I/L		Gwich´in	Gwichʼin
gwj			I/L			ǀGwi
gwm			I/E			Awngthim
gwn			I/L			Gwandara
gwr			I/L			Gwere
gwt			I/L			Gawar-Bati
gwu			I/E			Guwamu
gww			I/L			Kwini
gwx			I/L			Gua
gxx			I/L			Wè Southern
gya			I/L			Northwest Gbaya
gyb			I/L			Garus
gyd			I/L			Kayardild
gye			I/L			Gyem
gyf			I/E			Gungabula
gyg			I/L			Gbayi
gyi			I/L			Gyele
gyl			I/L			Gayil
gym			I/L			Ngäbere
gyn			I/L			Guyanese Creole English
gyo			I/L	Sino-Tibetan		Gyalsumdo
gyr			I/L			Guarayu
gyy			I/E			Gunya
gyz			I/L	Afro-Asiatic		Geji; Gyaazi
gza			I/L			Ganza
gzi			I/L			Gazi
gzn			I/L			Gane

== Sources ==
- "ISO 639-2 Registration Authority". Library of Congress.
- "ISO 639-3 Registration Authority". SIL International.
- Lewis, M. Paul; Simons, Gary F.; Fennig, Charles D., eds. (2016). "Ethnologue: Languages of the World" (19th ed.). Dallas, Texas: SIL International.
