= Red Gelao language =

Red Gelao language may refer to two different Gelao languages:

- A'ou language, spoken in Guizhou Province, China
- Vandu language, spoken in Ha Giang Province, Vietnam
