= Hezhang Buyi language =

Endangered Kra language spoken in China

Hezhang Buyi
- pu55 ʔʑei33
- Native to: China
- Region: Hezhang County, Guizhou
- Native speakers: <10 (2013)
- Language family: Kra–Dai: Tai; Northern Tai; Bouyei; Hezhang Buyi

Language codes
- ISO 639-3: None (mis)
- Glottolog: hezh1245

Hezhang Buyi (Chinese: 赫章布依语) or Shui is a nearly extinct, divergent Northern Tai language spoken in Hezhang County, Guizhou, China. It has a Kra substratum. Like other Kra languages (Gelao and Buyang), Maza, and Tujia, Hezhang Buyi displays circumfixal negation. Hezhang Buyi was only discovered in 2013.

== Classification ==
Andrew Hsiu (2017) considers Hezhang Buyi to be an unknown Kra language that had become relexified by neighboring Northern Tai languages. Although its autonym is pu55 ʔʑei33, it is highly divergent from the other Buyi dialects of Guizhou (Hsiu 2017). Hezhang Buyi has lost all final stop consonants. It shares lexical and phonological similarities with Buyi dialects spoken in Zhijin County and Shuicheng County of western Guizhou, as well as with Gelao and Lachi. The substrate language of Hezhang Buyi cannot be traced to any modern-day Kra language, but appears to share similarities with various Gelao and Lachi lects.

== Phonology ==
=== Consonants ===
Hsiu (2017) lists the following consonants:

Hezhang Buyi consonants
		Bilabial	Alveolar	Retroflex	Palatal	Velar	Uvular	Glottal
Plosive	Voiceless	pʰ p	tʰ t			kʰ k	q	ʔ
Plosive	Voiced	b bʰ ˀb	dʰ d ˀd					
Affricate	Voiceless				t͡ɕ			
Affricate	Voiced				d͡ʑ			
Fricative	Voiceless		s	ʂ	ɕ			
Fricative	Voiced		z	ʐ	ʑ ˀʑ			
Nasal		m	n		ɳ	ŋ		
Lateral			l ɬ ˀl					

The voiced retroflex ʐ is only found in the word mʐi^{21} 'year'. ˀb, ˀd, ˀl, and ˀʐ are pre-glottalized consonants.

=== Vowels ===
Hsiu (2017) identifies the following vowels:

Hezhang Buyi vowels
	Front	Central	Back	
	Front	Central	Unrounded	Rounded
Close	i		ɯ	u
Close-mid	e			o
Mid		ə		
Open-mid	æ	ɛ	ɔ	
Open	a		ɑ	

=== Tones ===
Hezhang Buyi has five tones. These are:

- 33 - mid level
- 55 - high level
- 21 - low falling
- 35 - rising
- 53 - high falling

== Distribution ==
Hezhang Buyi is spoken in Dazhai 大寨, Fuchu township 辅处乡, Hezhang County 赫章县, Guizhou, and may also be spoken in (Hsiu 2017):

- Yuguo village 雨果村, Weining County
- Zhuyuan 竹园, Kele Township 可乐乡, Hezhang County
- Tangbian 塘边, Zhuming Township 朱明乡, Hezhang County
