= Kra languages =

Branch of the Kra–Dai language family

Kra
- 仡央; Geyang
- Geographic distribution: Southern China, Northern Vietnam
- Linguistic classification: Kra–Dai: Kra
- Proto-language: Proto-Kra

Language codes
- Glottolog: kada1291

The Kra languages (/krɑː/ KRAH; also known as the Geyang or Kadai languages) are a branch of the Kra–Dai language family spoken in southern China (Guizhou, Guangxi, Yunnan) and in northern Vietnam (Hà Giang Province).

== Names ==
The name Kra comes from the word *kra^{C} "human" as reconstructed by Ostapirat (2000), which appears in various Kra languages as kra, ka, fa or ha. Benedict (1942) used the term Kadai for the Kra and Hlai languages grouped together and the term Kra-Dai is proposed by Ostapirat (2000).

The Kra branch was first identified as a unified group of languages by Liang (1990), who called it the Geyang (仡央) languages. Geyang is a portmanteau of the first syllable of Ge- in Gelao and the last syllable of -yang in Buyang. The name Kra was proposed by Ostapirat (2000) and is the term usually used by scholars outside China, whereas Geyang is the name currently used in China.

== Significance ==
Several Kra languages have regionally unusual consonant clusters and sesquisyllabic or disyllabic words, whereas other Kra–Dai languages tend to have only single syllables. The disyllables in Buyang have been used by Sagart (2004) to support the view that the Kra-Dai languages are a subgroup within the Austronesian family. Unlike the Tai and Kam–Sui languages, most Kra languages, including Gelao and Buyang, have preserved the proto-Kra–Dai numerical systems. The only other Kra–Dai branch that preserves this is Hlai. Most other Kra–Dai languages adopted Chinese numerals over 1000 years ago.

As noted by Jerold A. Edmondson, the Kra languages contain words in metalworking, handicrafts and agriculture that are not attested in any other Kra–Dai language. This suggests that the Kra peoples may have developed or borrowed many technological innovations independently of the Tai and Kam-Sui peoples.

According to Ostapirat (2026), Kra displays contact influence with Hmong-Mien and Austroasiatic, displaying lexical similarities with Khmuic in particular.

== Reconstruction ==
The Proto-Kra language has been reconstructed by Weera Ostapirat (2000).

== Classification ==
Morphological similarities suggest the Kra languages are closest to the Kam–Sui branch of the family. There are about a dozen Kra languages, depending on how languages and dialects are defined. Gelao, with about 8,000 speakers in China out of an ethnic population of approximately 500,000, and consists of at least four mutually unintelligible language varieties, including Telue (White Gelao), Hagei (Blue or Green Gelao), Vandu (Red Gelao), A'ou (Red Gelao), and Qau (Chinese Gelao).

=== Ostapirat (2000) ===
The internal classification below is from Weera Ostapirat (2000), who splits the Kra branch into the Eastern and Western branches.

- Kra
  - Western
    - Laha (Vietnam)
    - Ge‑Chi
      - Gelao (6 languages, China, Vietnam)
      - Lachi (China, Vietnam)
  - Eastern
    - Paha (generally subsumed under Buyang)
    - Yang‑Biao
      - Buyang (China)
      - En (Vietnam)
      - Qabiao (Laqua, Pupeo) (China, Vietnam)

According to Jerold Edmondson (2002), Laha is too conservative to be in Western Kra, considered it to constitute a branch of its own. However, Edmondson (2011) later reversed his position, considering Laha to be more closely related to Paha.

Ethnologue mistakenly includes the Hlai language Cun of Hainan in Kra; this is not supported by either Ostapirat or Edmondson.

=== Hsiu (2014) ===
Hsiu's (2014) classification of the Kra languages, based on computational phylogenetic analysis as well as Edmondson's (2011) earlier analysis of Kra, is given below, as cited in Norquest (2021).

- Kra
  - Northern Kra
    - Lachi
    - Gelao
      - Red Gelao
        - Vandu
        - A'ou
      - Core Gelao
        - Dongkou Gelao
        - White Gelao (Telue)
        - Central Gelao: Hagei, Qau
  - Southern Kra
    - Guangxi Buyang (Yalhong)
    - Laha, Paha
    - Qabiao
    - Yunnan Buyang: Ecun, Langjia, Nung Ven

=== Substrata ===
Andrew Hsiu (2013, 2017) reports that Hezhang Buyi, a divergent, moribund Northern Tai language spoken by 5 people in Dazhai (大寨), Fuchu Township (辅处乡), Hezhang County, Guizhou, China, has a Kra substratum.

Maza, a Lolo–Burmese language spoken in Mengmei (孟梅), Funing County, Yunnan, is also notable for having a Qabiao substratum (Hsiu 2014:68–69).

According to Li Jinfang (1999), the Yang Zhuang people of southwestern Guangxi may have been Kra speakers who had switched to Zhuang.

== Demographics ==
The Kra languages have a total of about 22,000 speakers. In Vietnam, officially recognized Kra peoples are the Cờ Lao, La Chí, La Ha and Pu Péo. In China, only the Gelao (Cờ Lao) have official status. The other Kra peoples are variously classified as Zhuang, Buyi, Yi, and Han.

"Hotspots" for Kra languages include: within China, most of western Guizhou, the prefecture-level city of Baise in western Guangxi, and Wenshan Zhuang and Miao Autonomous Prefecture in southeastern Yunnan; as well as northern Vietnam's Hà Giang Province. This distribution runs along a northeast-southwest geographic vector, forming what Jerold A. Edmondson calls a "language corridor."

Multilingualism is common among Kra language speakers. For example, many Buyang can also speak Zhuang.

- Western
  - Lachi (拉基, La Chí) – 10,300 (7,863 in Vietnam in 1990; 2,500 in Maguan County, Yunnan, China in 1995)
  - Gelao (仡佬, Cờ Lao) – 7,900 (spoken in Guizhou, Longlin Various Nationalities Autonomous County in Guangxi, and northern Vietnam)
  - Laha (拉哈, La Ha) – 1,400 (officially recognized in Vietnam; most divergent western Kra language)
- Eastern
  - Buyang dialect cluster – 2,000
    - Paha – considered a separate language by Ostapirat; spoken in Yangliancun (央连村), Diyu Township, Guangnan County, Yunnan
    - Langjia (郎架) – spoken in Langjia, Funing County, Yunnan along the Guangxi border
    - Ecun (峨村) – spoken in Ecun, Funing County, Yunnan along the Guangxi border
    - Yalang (雅郎, Yalhong) – spoken in Rongtun (荣屯), Napo County, Guangxi
  - Qabiao (Pubiao 普标, Pu Péo) – 700
  - En (Nùng Vên; spoken in northern Vietnam) – 250

== Numerals ==
Numerals in the Kra Languages
Language	One	Two	Three	Four	Five	Six	Seven	Eight	Nine	Ten
(Proto-Austronesian)	*isa	*duSa	*telu	*Sepat	*lima	*enem	*pitu	*walu	*Siwa	*sa-puluq
Proto-Kra	*tʂəm C	*sa A	*tu A	*pə A	*r-ma A	*x-nəm A	*t-ru A	*m-ru A	*s-ɣwa B	*pwlot D
Buyang, Baha	tɕam45	θa322	tu322	pa322	m̥a33	nam31	ðu33	mu31	dʱa33	pʷat55
Buyang, Ecun	pi53	θa24	tu24	pa24	ma44	nam24	tu44	ma0 ðu44	va55	put55
Buyang, Langjia	am35	ɕa54	tu54	pa54	ma312	nam54	ðu312	ma0 ðu312	va11	put55
Buyang, Yerong	ɔm55	θau53	taːi53	po53	mo43	naːm53	təu31	ɬəu43	vo55	pɔt55
En (Nung Ven)	ʔam332	θa243	tu243	pa33	ma243	nəm243	ʔam332 tu243	me332 ru33	wa54	θət33
Qabiao	tɕia33	ɕe53	tau53	pe53	ma33	ma33 nam35	ma33 tu53	ma33 ʐɯ33	ma33 ɕia31	pət31
Laha, Wet	tɕɐm31	sa343	tu343	pɑ343	mɑ33	dɐm343	tʰo343	ma33 hu33	so33 wa24	pɤt23
Laha, Dry	cạm6	śa5	tợw3	pa3	ha6	hôk4	cêt4	pet4	kạw6	śêp4
Lachi	tɕa33	su11	te11	pu11	m̩11	ȵiã11	te24	ŋuɛ11	liu24	pɛ11
Gelao, Bigong	sɿ55 təɯ33	səɯ31 təɯ33	tɔ31	pɔ31	mɔ31	nai31	tʰɔ31	ʑɔ31	ʑɔu31	hui13
Gelao, Moji	tsɿ53	səu31	ta31	pu31	mlau31	tɕʰau31	xei31	xe31	kəu31	tsʰei53
Gelao, Puding	se55	so55	tua55	pu45	mu53	naŋ53	ɕi33	vra53	su33	paɯ33
Gelao, Pudi	sɪ55	səɯ42	tji42	pau42	mau31	mjaŋ31	te42	ɣe31	sau13	ɕye13
Gelao, Red	tsə44	se33	tua44	pu44	maŋ44	ɬoŋ44	te44	wu35	ʂe35	la51 kwe44
Gelao, White	tsɿ33	sɯn35	tau55	pu55	mlən35	tɕʰau55	hi55	ɕiau55	ku55	tɕʰiu33
Gelao, Sanchong	ʂɿ43	ʂa45	tau45	pu45	mei21	ȵaŋ21	tʂau45	ʑau21	ʂo43	sɿ43 pie43
Gelao, Wanzi	si33	su33	ta33	pu33	mpu44	nan33	ɕi24	vla44	səɯ24	pe24
Mulao	tsɿ53	ɬu24	ta24	pʰu24	mu31	ȵe31	sau31	ɣau31	so24	ve53
Gelao, Heijiaoyan	sɿ44	sɑ44	tuu44	pu44	-	-	-	-	-	-
Gelao, Jianshan	ʐɤ42	sw42	tuɑ42	pu44	-	-	-	-	-	-
Gelao, Banliwan	i53	ɑ53	ɑ53 muŋ53	ɑŋ44	-	-	-	-	-	-
Gelao, Zunyi	失 (shi)	沙 (sha)	刀 (dao)	波 (bo)	媒 (mei)	娘召 (niangshao)	召 (shao)	饶 (rao)	署 (shu)	失不 (shibu)
Gelao, Renhuai	思 (shi)	沙 (sha)	刀 (dao)	波 (bo)	差 (cha)	良 (liang)	-	绕 (rao)	素 (su)	死比 (sibi)
