= Gelao =

Gelao may refer to:

- Gelao language
- Gelao people, an ethnic group of China and Vietnam
- Gelao, (simplified Chinese: 阁老; traditional Chinese: 閤老; pinyin: Gélǎo; lit. 'Cabinet (government) Elder'), an official post in ancient Chinese governments
