= Lachi language =

Kra language spoken in Vietnam

Lachi
- Region: Vietnam, China
- Ethnicity: Lachi
- Native speakers: (7,000 cited 1990–2007)
- Language family: Kra–Dai: Kra; Ge–Chi; Lachi

Language codes
- ISO 639-3: Either: lbt – Lachi lwh – White Lachi
- Glottolog: lach1247
- ELP: Lachi

The Lachi language (Chinese: 拉基; pinyin: lājī, Vietnamese: La Chí; autonym in China: li35 pu44 ljo44; autonym in Vietnam: qu32 te453, where qu32 means "person") is a Kra language spoken in Yunnan, China and in northern Vietnam. There were 9,500 Lachi speakers in Vietnam in 1990. Edmondson (2008) reports another 2,500 in Maguan County, Yunnan, China for 1995, but Li Yunbing (2000) reports 60 speakers in Maguan out of an ethnic population of 1,600.

== Subdivisions ==
Weera Ostapirat proposed three major subdivisions for the Lachi language.

- Northern (Chinese or Flowery Lachi)
- Central (White Lachi)
- Southern (Long Haired and Black Lachi)

Jerold A. Edmondson notes that Vietnamese researchers recently have not been able to locate White (Central) Lachi speakers. It is also the least studied variety of Lachi.

The Maguan County Gazetteer 马关县志 (1996) lists the following Lachi ethnic subdivisions.

- Flowery Lachi 花拉基
- White Lachi 白拉基
- Black Lachi 黑拉基
- Chinese Lachi 汉拉基
- Manyou Lachi 曼忧拉基
- Manpeng Lachi 曼棚拉基

The Maguan County Gazetteer 马关县志 (1996) also lists the following autonyms for the Lachi.

- She 舍
- Laguo 拉果
- Heitu 黑土
- Gudai 古逮
- Yibi 依比
- Yimei 依梅
- Yiduo 依多
- Yibeng 依崩

The Republic of China-era Maguan County Gazetteer 马关县志 gives the names Labo 剌僰 (with a dog radical 犭for La 剌) and Laji 拉鸡 (Li 2000: 5).

== Geographic distribution ==
Kosaka (2000) reports 6,000–8,000 Lachi speakers in Vietnam, and 2,000 in China. The Lachi of Maguan County, China are currently classified as Zhuang (Li 2000), while the Lachi of Malipo County, China, along with the Qabiao, are classified as Yi. The Lachi of Vietnam have official status as a separate ethnic group.

=== China ===
The Lachi of China live in various locations in Maguan County (马关县), Yunnan, which is located in Wenshan Zhuang and Miao Autonomous Prefecture (文山壮族苗族自治州) near the border with Hà Giang Province, Vietnam. According to American linguist Jerold A. Edmondson, the Lachi of China are thought to have moved to their present location during the Qing Dynasty from places in Vietnam called Maibu 麥布, Maidu 麥督, and Maiha 麥哈. Other Lachis are also found scattered in Yanshan, Qiubei, Xichou, and Malipo counties.

The subdivisions, with their respective locations, are as follows:

Flowery Lachi (autonym: li35 pu44 ljo44 n̩44 tɕo55)

- Jinchang Township 金厂镇
  - Zhongzhai 中寨
  - Sanjiajie 三家街

Chinese Lachi (autonym: li35 pu44 tɕo44)

- Jiahanqing Township 夹寒箐乡
  - Niulongshan 牛龙山
  - Dujiaozhai 独脚寨
  - Shi'er Daohe 十二道河
  - Laozhai 老寨
- Renhe Township 仁和镇
  - Baishiyan 白石岩
  - Shiqiao 石桥
  - Huomuqing 火木箐

Pocket Lachi (autonym: li35 pu44 te35)

- Nanlao Township 南捞乡: Busu 布苏

Red Lachi (autonym: li33 pu44 ke55)

- Xiaobazi Township 小坝子镇
  - Tianpeng 田棚
  - Laqie 拉劫 / Laqi 拉气

=== Vietnam ===
The Lachi live mostly in Xín Mần District and Hoàng Su Phì District, Hà Giang Province, Vietnam. There are also many Lachi living in Bắc Quang District in southern Hà Giang Province, which is outside their home district of Hoàng Su Phì. Since the Lachi dialects of Vietnam have many Chinese loanwords, the Lachi of Vietnam must have migrated from areas to the north in China (Kosaka 2000). Similarly, the Lachi of Maguan County, Yunnan, China just across the border believed that their ancestors had migrated from Ami Prefecture 阿迷州, which is now Kaiyuan, Yunnan. In Vietnam, Jerold Edmondson notes that the most common autonym used by his Lachi informants is qu3˩ te34˩, with qu3˩ meaning 'people' (from Proto-Kra *khra^{C1} 'people').

The Lachi people are an officially recognized ethnic group in Vietnam, and are divided as such (Kosaka 2000, Edmondson 2008):

Long Haired Lachi (autonym: li35 pu44 tjoŋ44)

- Bản Phùng, Hoàng Su Phì District — largest village; regarded as cradle site

Black Lachi (autonym: li35 pu44 pi55)

- Bản Díu, Xín Mần — speakers have shifted to the Nùng language

White Lachi (autonym: li35 pu44 pu55; language possibly extinct)

- Bản Pắng, Hoàng Su Phì District — speakers have shifted to the Nùng language, the regional lingua franca
- Bản Máy, Hoàng Su Phì District — speakers have shifted to the Nùng language, the regional lingua franca

Lachi is also spoken in (Kosaka 2000):

- Tân Lợi hamlet (Thôn Tân Lợi), Bắc Quang District, Hà Giang Province — formed through a secondary migration from Tân Lập village (Xã Tân Lập), which is now called Xã Tân Thành.
- Chí Cà, Xín Mần District, Hà Giang Province
- Bắc Hà District, Lào Cai Province — descended from Bản Phùng migrants; can no longer speak Lachi (e.g., in Thôn Núng Choáng, Xã Nàm Sán)
- Mường Khương District, Lào Cai Province — descended from Bản Phùng migrants; can no longer speak Lachi

Kosaka (2000) describes the following migratory route that took the Lachi of Bản Phùng, Hoàng Su Phì District to other locations, all in Bắc Quang District, Hà Giang Province.

1. Bản Phùng, Hoàng Su Phì District
2. Xã Tân Lập (now called Xã Tân Thành)
3. Xã Yên Bình
4. Xã Vĩ Thượng
5. Xã Xuân Giang (later divided into two parts, including Nà Khương, which has the higher concentration of Lachi people)

The Maguan County Gazetteer 马关县志 (1996) lists the following locations in Vietnam with ethnic Lachi.

- Manyou 曼忧
- Manpeng 曼棚
- Manban 曼班
- Manmei 曼美
- Jiga 鸡嘎
- Hualong 花隆
- Mengkang 猛康

== Grammar ==
Like other Kra languages such as Gelao and Buyang, Lachi displays clause-final negation (Li 2000).

== Phonology ==
The following phonology of Lachi has been adapted from Li (2000).

=== Consonants ===
		Labial		Alveolar		(Alveolo-) palatal	Velar		Uvular	Glottal
		plain	pal.	plain	pal.	(Alveolo-) palatal	plain	lab.	Uvular	Glottal
Stop/ Affricate	voiceless	p	pʲ	t	tʲ	tɕ	k	kʷ	q	ʔ
Stop/ Affricate	aspirated	pʰ	pʲʰ	tʰ	tʲʰ		kʰ	kʷʰ	qʰ	
Stop/ Affricate	voiced	b	bʲ	(d)						
Fricative		f		(s)		ɕ				h
Approximant						j	w			
Nasal		m	mʲ	n	nʲ (Note: Note: Transcribed as <ȵ> in Li (2000))	ɲ	ŋʷ			
Lateral				l	lʲ					
Syllabic	voiced	m̩					ŋ̍ʷ			
Syllabic	glottalized	ˀm̩					ˀŋ̍ʷ			

- /d/ appears in loanwords of Vietnamese origin.
- Approximant sounds /j w/ when occurring before /i/, may also be realized as [ʑ ʊ̯]. Both sounds also can be realized as a voiced glottal sound [ɦ].

=== Vowels ===
	Front	Central	Back	
Close	i		u	
Close-mid	e		ɤ	o
Open-mid	ɛ		ɔ	
Open		a	ɑ	

- Standard vowel sounds [i] and [ɛ], only occur after palatal, velar, palatalized and labialized initials. After other initials elsewhere, they become velarized as [-ˠi], [-ˠɛ].
