= Chishui =

Chishui may refer to:

== Rivers and city ==
- Chishui River (赤水河), a major tributary of the Yangtze
  - Chishui City (赤水市), Guizhou
- Chishui River (Shaanxi), a tributary of the Wei River in Shaanxi
- Jishui River (急水溪), also romanised Chishui, in Tainan, Taiwan

== Towns (赤水镇) ==
- Chishui, Dehua County, Fujian
- Chishui, Zhangping, Fujian
- Chishui, Guangdong, in Kaiping
- Chishui, Jiangxi, in Guangchang County
- Chishui, Shaanxi, in Hua County
- Chishui, Sichuan, in Xuyong County
