= Li Jinfang =

Chinese linguist

- Born: Li Jinfang; October 1963 (age 62–63); Tianlin County, Guangxi
- Occupation: Linguist

Academic background
- Education: Minzu University

Academic work
- Institutions: Minzu University
- Main interests: Kra-Dai languages
- Notable works: Studies on endangered languages in the Southwest China (2006)

Chinese name
- Simplified Chinese: 李锦芳
Transcriptions
Standard Mandarin
- Hanyu Pinyin: Lǐ Jǐnfāng

Li Jinfang (Chinese: 李锦芳; pinyin: Lǐ Jǐnfāng; born October 1963 in Tianlin County, Guangxi) is a Chinese linguist at Minzu University in Beijing, China. Li, an ethnic Zhuang, is a leading specialist in the Kra-Dai languages of southern China, especially the Kra (Geyang) branch. Li's doctoral dissertation focused on the Buyang language, and was published as Studies on the Buyang Language (布央语研究, Bùyāng Yǔ Yánjiū) in 1999.

== Publications ==
Li's Studies on endangered languages in the Southwest China (西南地区濒危语言调查研究, Xīnán Dìqū Bīnwēi Yǔyán Diàochá Yánjiū) describes the following languages.

- Buyang
- En
- Gelao of Judu, Yueliangwan, Bigong, Dagouchang
- Pubiao (Qabiao)
- Chadong
- Hu
- Bugan
- Lai (Bolyu)
