= Tân Quang (disambiguation) =

Tân Quang may refer to several places in Vietnam, including:

- Tân Quang, a commune of Tuyên Quang province
- Tân Quang, Bắc Giang, a former rural commune of Lục Ngạn District

== See also ==
- Tan Qiang (born 1998), Chinese badminton player
