= Qau =

Qau or QAU may be,

- Qau language
- Quaid-i-Azam University
- Qau, also called Qaw el-Kebir or Tjebu, in Egypt
