= Mulao language =

Mulao may be:

- Mulam language, a Kam-Sui language spoken in Guangxi
- Mulao language (Kra), an extinct Kra language that was spoken in Guizhou
