= LWH =

LWH may refer to:

- Lawrence Hill railway station has National Rail code LWH
- Lightweight Helmet
- Liverpool Women's Hospital
- White Lachi is a Tai–Kadai language with ISO 639:l language code lwh
