= GIW =

GIW may refer to:

- Great Indian Warpath, a Native American trail in the United States
- Groton Iron Works, a defunct American shipyard
- White Gelao language
