= Gelao people =

Ethnic group in China and Vietnam

Gelao
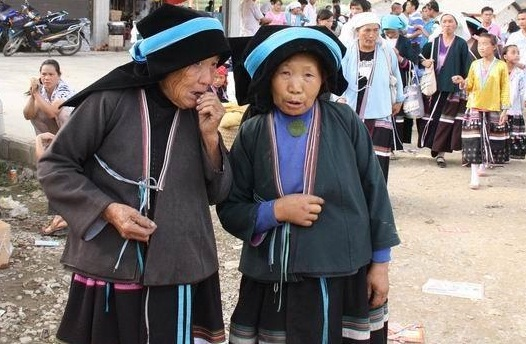

Total population
- 677,521 (2020 census)

Regions with significant populations
- China: Guizhou, Guangxi, Yunnan Sichuan Vietnam: Hà Giang

Languages
- Gelao

Religion
- Taoism • Buddhism

The Gelao people (also spelled Gelo; Gelao: Klau; Chinese: 仡佬族; pinyin: Gēlǎozú) are an ethnic group of China and Vietnam. They form one of the 56 ethnic groups officially recognized by the People's Republic of China. However, many Gelao are also variously classified as Yi, Miao, and Zhuang by the Chinese government.

They number approximately 677,521 and are mainly located in Gelao autonomous counties in the western part of Guizhou, such as Wuchuan Gelao and Miao Autonomous County and Daozhen Gelao and Miao Autonomous County in Zunyi. They are also found in Liupanshui, Anshun, Dafang, and Bijie. Some live in western Guangxi (Longlin Various Nationalities Autonomous County), southeastern Yunnan and southern Sichuan. The main religion practiced is Taoism with a small but significant Buddhist minority.

== History ==
The Gelao people are often considered to be the indigenous inhabitants of Guizhou. The ancestors of the Gelao were the Rau peoples, who made up the population of ancient Yelang.

== Language ==
The Gelao languages belong to the Kra–Dai language family. Today, only a small minority of the Gelao still speak this language. Since the various Gelao dialects differ greatly from each other, Mandarin has been used as a lingua franca and is now the main language spoken by Gelaos. Hmong, Nuosu, and Bouyei are also used.

== Culture ==
Gelao men's traditional suit consists of a jacket fastened up the side and long pants. Gelao women wear short jackets and narrow skirts, divided into three parts: The top section is elaborate in red wool, while the other two parts are made of black and white bordered fabric. Both men and women wear long scarves.

The Gelao make a two-stringed fiddle with a body made from a cow horn, called the jiaohu (角胡; pinyin: jiǎohú) used in their traditional music.

The Gelao people have their own language, Gelao. At present, only a little over a thousand Gelao people can speak their traditional language. The Gelao language differs greatly from place to place due to scattered living. Most Gelao people speak several languages in the same language family, such as Mandarin, Miao, Yi, and Bouyei.

Gelao folk circulates oral literature such as poetry and proverbs. Ancient folk songs consist of long and short sentences of varying numbers of words. In the past two or three hundred years, they have been greatly influenced by the genre of Han poetry, and many have borrowed Chinese words and phrases.

=== Language ===
It was previously thought that the Gelao people only had a spoken language, not a written one. However, in September 2008, The History of Jiu Tian Da Ling (English: Record of the Nine Heavens) was found in Guizhou. The book is kept by a Gelao person with a surname of Li in Qianbei, whose ancestors were from the Song dynasty. A descendant of King Li Wentong of Gulao, he himself does not know what kind of book this is, but he has always inherited his ancestral teachings and treasures the book. The discovery of Record of the Nine Heavens fully proved that the Gelao people and their splendid culture have a long history, reaching back to ancient times. It not only has a written language, but it was also the earliest nation that advocated the concept of "harmony and harmony". The Gelao tribe invented their own words of tea, fireworks, copper, iron, etc.

Although the book identifies the distribution area of the Gelao ethnic group described in Record of the Nine Heavens in a manner consistent with information that circulated locally during the mid-1980s (for example, it states that the origin of the Gelao is in Wuchuan, but core parts of Yelang now lying in Panjiang, Chishui, and Hebei are ignored), it deviates from local history records dating from the Ming and Qing dynasties. However, the description of the ancient song "Sue Genyou" in Gelao, and the classical Chinese and Gelao language written in The History of Nine Heavens contain many grammatical errors, presenting the possibility of a modern-day forgery.

The Gelao people living in the western part of Guizhou, such as Anshun, used to have Gelao characters derived from Chinese characters, which had been used to record some folk songs.

== Subgroups ==
The Gelao consist of various subgroups. Their historical exonyms, given in a provincial ethnic gazetteer from the Republic of China era, include the following.

- Flowery Gelao 花仡佬, in Qianwei 前卫, Pingfa 平伐司, Yongning 永宁州, Shibing 施秉, Longquan 龙泉, Huangping 黄平
- Red Gelao 红仡佬, in Qingshan 青山司, Anping 安平县, Renhuai 仁怀县, Liping 黎平府
- Jiantou/Cut-Head Gelao 剪头仡佬, in Guiding 贵定, Shibing 施秉, Huangping 黄平, Yongning 永宁
- Tooth-Hitting Gelao 打牙仡佬, in Pingyue 平越, Qianxi 黔西, Anping 安平, Yongping 永宁, Pingyuan 平远, Huangping 黄平, Qingzhen 清镇
- Guoquan/Pot-Circle Gelao 锅圈仡佬, in Pingyuan 平远, Anping 安平, Dading 大定
- Datie/Iron-Hit Gelao 打铁仡佬, in Pingyuan 平远州
- Pipao/Robe Gelao 披袍仡佬, in Pingyuan 平远, Anping 安平, Dading 大定
- Shui/Water Gelao 水仡佬, in Yuqing 余庆, Zhenyuan 镇远, Shibing 施秉, Yongning 永宁
- Tu/Native/Indigenous Gelao 土仡佬, in Weining 威宁
- Yayi/Elegant Gelao 雅意仡佬, in Yongning 永宁

=== Yi people ===
The Yi (羿), who number no more 3,000 people, live in the Chishui (赤水) area in Xuyong County, Sichuan, which is on the border with Guizhou. They are a subgroup of the Gelao but have a distinctive history. The Yi call themselves the gau13. In comparison, the Gelao of Xinzhai 新寨, Puding 普定, Guizhou, call themselves the qau13. The Yi live in:

- Chishui village 赤水镇, Xuyong County 叙永县, Sichuan
- Napangou 纳盘沟, Gulin County 古蔺县, Sichuan. According to the Gulin County Gazetteer (1993), ethnic Gelao and Yi are found on the northern banks of the Chishui River 赤水河, in Napan township 纳盘乡.
- Xiaohe 小河, Puyi 普宜, Bijie County 毕节县, Guizhou
- Yindi 阴底, Bijie County 毕节县, Guizhou

The Yi have been mentioned since the Tang dynasty, and were said to have come from the north. The Yi are also noted for their belief in the Zitong (子童) Bodhisattva (菩萨).

Unlike most Gelao dialects, the Yi dialect uses a Loloish-derived numeral system (Zhang 1993:424).

=== Gelao in Vietnam ===
In Vietnam, the Gelao are recognized as an official ethnic group. There are 2,636 Gelaos in Vietnam (2009), mostly inhabited in the karst plateau Hoàng Su Phì and Đồng Văn districts of Hà Giang province. They represent a majority in Túng Sán commune of Hoàng Su Phì.

== See also ==
- Languages of China
