= Gelao languages =

Kra language spoken in China and Vietnam

Gelao
- Kláo
- Native to: China, Vietnam
- Region: Western Guizhou, Wenshan Prefecture in Yunnan, Longlin County in Guangxi, China; Hà Giang Province in Vietnam
- Native speakers: 7,900 (2008)
- Language family: Kra–Dai: Kra; Ge–Chi; Gelao
- Dialects: Vandu; A'ou, Mulao; Hagei (Hakhi); Duoluo (Tolo); Qau (Gao)

Language codes
- ISO 639-3: gio (deprecated)
- Glottolog: gela1265

Gelao (autonym: Kláo, Chinese: 仡佬 Gēlǎo, Vietnamese: Cờ Lao) is a Kra language in the Kra–Dai language family. It is spoken by the Gelao people in southern China and northern Vietnam. Despite an ethnic population of 580,000 (2000 census of China), only a few thousand still speak Gelao in China. Estimates run from 3,000 in China by Li in 1999, of which 500 are monolinguals, to 7,900 by Edmondson in 2008. Edmondson (2002) estimates that the three Gelao varieties of Vietnam have only about 350 speakers altogether.

== External relationships ==
Like Buyang, another Kra language, Gelao contains many words which are likely to be Austronesian cognates. (See Austro-Tai languages.)

As noted by Li and Zhou (1999), Gelao shares much vocabulary with the Hlai and Ong Be languages, suggesting contact with Pre-Hlai speakers before their migration to Hainan.

== Demographics ==
=== China ===
Zhang Jimin estimated a total of over 10,000 Gelao speakers in the early 1990s, while Li Jinfang places this number at 3,000 in 1999. Jerold A. Edmondson's 2008 estimate is 7,900 speakers. This number is rapidly declining, as the Gelao are intermarrying with the neighboring Han, Bouyei, and Miao. Many Gelao speakers can also speak Bouyei, Zhuang, or Miao, and nearly all can speak local varieties of Chinese. Among Gelao-speaking families, most middle-age Gelao have very limited speaking abilities for Gelao, while much of the younger generation cannot even understand the most simple words and phrases.

A divergent variety of Gelao known as Shuicheng Gelao 水城仡佬语 (also known as Datie Gelao 打铁仡佬语; autonym: pu55 qau24) is spoken in Dongkou 洞口村, Houchang Township 猴场乡 and Datiezhai 打铁寨, Miluo Township 米箩乡, both located in Shuicheng County, Guizhou Province, China (Li & Yang 2016: 71). The Gelao of Datiezhai reported that they had migrated from Dongkou 4 generations ago. Li & Yang (2016) report that there are only 3 speakers of Shuicheng Gelao left.

The Mulao number 28,000 people, and are distributed in Majiang, Kaili, Huangping, Duyun, Weng'an, Fuquan, and other counties of southeastern Guizhou. The Mulao of Xuanwei and Jidong villages refer to themselves as the Mu, and in Longli village 龙里寨 they call themselves qa24 ɣo53. The Mulao speak a variety of Gelao, not the Mulam language of Guangxi, which is also called Mulao. Luo (1997) describes the two Mulao varieties of qa24 o53 (qa24 ɣo53) in Majiang County and lei35 wo33 in Kaili City. One dialect is represented by the datapoints of Bamaozhai 巴茅寨 and Madizhai 马碲寨 of Xuanwei District 宣威区, Majiang County (Luo 1997:105, 115), and the other by Bailazhai 白腊寨, Lushan Town 炉山镇, Kaili City (Luo 1997:189); the latter is also spoken in Dafengdong 大风洞, Pingliang 平良, and Chong'anjiang 重安江. Mulao data from Majiang and Kaili are also given in Guizhou (1985).

The extinct Tuman language (土蛮语) of Sinan County, Guizhou was a variety of Gelao.

Hsiu (2017) reports a Wai Gelao (Chinese: 歪仡佬语, "Crooked Gelao") language variety from Dingjiapo 丁家坡, Mugang Village 木杠村, Muyang Town 木央镇, Funing County, Yunnan. One 83-year-old woman remembered a few kinship terms.

In Qingzhen City, A'ou Gelao is spoken in the following villages (Qingzhen 2004:25-30).

- Luohang village 落夯村
- Mahuang village 蚂蟥村, Wangzhuang Township 王庄布依族苗族乡
- Yinqiao village 银桥村, Weicheng Town 卫城镇
- Yangshan village 阳山村, Anliu Township 暗流乡

Zhou (2004) reports that there are no more than 6,000 Gelao speakers, making up only 1.2% of the total number of ethnic Gelao people. The following table, based on Zhou (2004:150–151), shows the number of Gelao speakers in each county as of the 1990s. All counties are in Guizhou province unless specified otherwise.

Demographics of Gelao speakers
County	Ethnic Gelao population	Number of Gelao speakers	Locations of ethnic Gelao
Renhuai City	4,347	Very few elderly speakers remaining	Townships of Maoba 茅坝 (including Yatang 哑塘), Changgang 长岗, Yun'an 云安, Zhongshu 中枢, Luban 鲁班, Wuma 五马
Zunyi County	2,922	Few speakers in Pingzheng Township 平正乡	Mostly in Pingzheng 平正乡, a few in Panshui 泮水乡
Jinsha County	1,584	Few elderly speakers in Hongzi Township 红梓乡	
Dafang County	4,000+	50+ speakers in Pudi Township 普底乡	
Qianxi County	7,000+	50+ speakers in Shajing Township 沙井乡	Also in Huashi 化石 and Yang'er 羊耳
Zhijin County	6,250	Only a few elderly speakers	
Puding County	3,770	300	Townships of Maodong 猫洞, Machang 马场, Mengzhou 猛舟: 10+ villages
Anshun City	2,559	300	Villages of Dagelao 大仡佬, Heizhai 黑寨, Wanzi 湾子寨, Heqiao 河桥, Amian 阿棉寨, etc.
Pingba County	2,311	500	
Qingzhen City	3,679	Only a few elderly speakers	
Guanling Buyei and Miao Autonomous County	6,405	500	20+ villages in 10+ townships: Hagei speakers in Ma'ao 麻垇 (in Xinpu Township 新铺乡), Huoshitian 火石田, Longtan 龙潭, Shaxin 沙心, etc.
Zhenning Buyei and Miao Autonomous County	1,555	300	Townships of Dingqi 丁旗, Liuma 六马, etc.
Qinglong County	501	300	
Zhenfeng County	1,024	300	
Shuicheng County	1,862	Only a few elderly speakers	Townships of Yingpan 营盘, Houchang 猴场, Miluo 米箩, Panlong 蟠龙, etc.
Liuzhi Special District	8,218	1,000+	Mostly in the township of Qingkou 箐口
Longlin Various Nationalities Autonomous County, Guangxi	-	200+	
Malipo County, Yunnan	-	100+	Also in Funing (in Dingjiapo 丁家坡), Guangnan, and Maguan Counties.

The Gelao people in the following counties do not speak any form of the Gelao language whatsoever, and have shifted entirely to Southwestern Mandarin.

Ethnic Gelao without knowledge of the Gelao language
County	Ethnic Gelao population
Wuchuan Gelao and Miao Autonomous County	145,989
Daozhen Gelao and Miao Autonomous County	112,025
Zheng'an County	31,706
Fenggang County	5,982
Yuqing County	4,347
Zunyi City	2,158
Shiqian County	97,500
Songtao County	-
Sinan County	-
Funing County, Yunnan	60

=== Vietnam ===
The most endangered variety, Red Gelao of Vietnam, is spoken by only about 50 people. Many speakers have shifted to Southwestern Mandarin or Hmong. The Red Gelao people, who call themselves the va35 ntɯ31, send brides back and forth among the villages of Na Khê and Bạch Đích (or Bìch Đich) in Yên Minh District, Hà Giang Province, Vietnam and another village in Fanpo, Malipo County, Yunnan, China (autonym: u33 wei55) in order to ensure the continual survival of their ethnic group. Edmondson (1998) reports that there are also Red Gelao people in Cán Tí, Quản Bạ District and Túng Sán, Hoàng Su Phì District who no longer speak any Gelao, and speak Hmong, Tay, or Vietnamese instead. Hoang (2013:12) reports that there also some Red Gelao in Vĩnh Hảo commune, Bắc Quang District who had moved from Túng Sán commune. However, the White Gelao of Phố La Village and Sính Lủng Village of Dồng Văn District still speak the White Gelao language.

== Varieties ==
Gelao is not well documented, having only been studied by a few scholars such as Li Jinfang, Jerold A. Edmondson, Weera Ostapirat, and Zhang Jimin. The three varieties in Vietnam are not mutually intelligible, and three varieties in China may be distinct languages as well. Ethnologue classifies Gelao as four languages, perhaps as closely related to the two Lachi languages as they are to each other.

=== Ostapirat (2000), Edmondson (2008) ===
Ostapirat (2000) proposed three major subdivisions for Gelao, with a total of 17 varieties. The Central and Southwestern branches shares various phonological innovations, suggesting an initial split with the Northern branch. Some varieties cited are also from Jerold A. Edmondson (2008). Edmondson also proposes that Red Gelao of the China-Vietnam border may in fact constitute a separate primary branch of Gelao.

Central (Gao)

- Wanzi 弯子寨, Anshun 安顺, Guizhou (also spoken in Heizhai 黑寨)
- Dagouchang 大狗场, Huolong 活龙乡, Pingba 平坝, Guizhou
- Xinzhai 新寨, Baiyan 白岩乡, Puding 普定, Guizhou (also spoken in Wozi 窝子)
- Sanchong (三冲村), Longlin (隆林县), Guangxi
- Green Gelao of Hoàng Su Phì, Vietnam

Northern (Red Gelao)

- Qiaoshang 桥上, Xiongjiazhai 熊家寨乡, Longchang 龙场区, Zhijin 织金, Guizhou
- Bigong 比贡, Dingqi 丁旗乡, Zhenning 镇宁, Guizhou
- Longli 龙里, Majiang 麻江, Guizhou (Zhang calls this dialect Mulao 木佬; autonym: qa23 ɣo53 嘎窝); there are two dialects (Bo Wenze 2003):
  - Xiasi 下司 (in Longlizhai 龙里寨, etc.) and Longshan 龙山 (in Bamaozhai 芭茅寨 of Fuxing 复兴村, Huangtuzhai 黄土寨 of Wengpao 翁袍村, Bailazhai 白腊寨, etc.) of Majiang County
  - Lushan 炉山, Chongbaizhai 重摆寨 of Dafengdong 大风洞 (autonym: lei35 wo33 类窝), and Pingliang 平良 of Kaili City; Chang'anjiang 长安江 of Huangping County
- Longjia 龙家寨, Zhijin 织金, Guizhou

Southwestern (White and Green Gelao)

- Laozhai 老寨, Malipo 麻栗坡, Yunnan (related dialects spoken in Yueliangwan 月亮弯 of Yangwan township 杨万乡; Fengyan 峰岩 of Dongdu village 董度村; Chongba 铳八 of Donggan 董干乡)
- Ban Ma Che, Đồng Văn, Hà Giang, Vietnam
- White Gelao of Hà Giang Province: Đồng Vǎn, Hoàng Su Phì, Quản Bạ, and Mèo Vạc districts
- Red Gelao of Fanpo (翻坡), Malipo (麻栗坡县), Yunnan (?)
- Moji 摩/磨/么基, Longlin 隆林, Guangxi in 上冲 Shangchong and 下冲 Xiachong (< 400 speakers; near Dashuijing 大水井; related dialects in Wantao 弯桃 and Zhe'ai 者艾 of Yancha 岩茶乡)
- Niupo 牛坡, Liuzhi 六枝, Guizhou (most populous; also spoken in Machang 马场镇 of Puding 普定县 and Agong 阿弓镇 of Zhijin 织金县; Judu 居都, Yanjiao 岩脚, Houzitian 猴子田, Langjiaba 郞家坝, and Duojiao 堕脚 of Liuzhi 六枝)
- Datiezhai 打铁寨, Shuicheng 水城, Guizhou (also spoken in Gaoshi 高石 and Miluo 米箩)
- Dingyinshao 定银哨, Zhenning 镇宁, Guizhou
- Pudi 普底, Dafang 大方, Guizhou (also spoken in Hongfeng 红丰村)
- Jianshan 尖山, Zunyi 遵义, Guizhou (also spoken in Pingzheng 平正, Zunyi along with Red and Green Gelao; fewer than 500 speakers)
- Qinglong 青龙, Zunyi 遵义, Guizhou
- Sanchong 三冲村, Longlin 隆林, Guangxi (grouped as Central by Shen Yumay and Jerold A. Edmondson)

=== Zhang (1993) ===
Zhang Jimin (1993) recognizes the following subdivisions of Gelao.

- Central 黔中方言 (10,000 speakers)
  - Dagouchang subdialect 平坝县大狗场土语: spoken in Wanzi 弯子 and Heizhai 黑寨 of Anshun City 安顺县; and Dagouchang 大狗场 and Wangzhai 王寨 of Pingba County 平坝县 (autonyms: klɑu55 in Anshun; lɑu55 or pɯ55 lɑu55 in Pingba).
  - Xinzhai subdialect 普定县新寨土语: spoken in Xinzhai 新寨, Wozi 窝子, Changchong 长冲, and Weiqi 未七 villages in Baiyan District 白岩区, Puding District 普定县 (autonym: qɑu13).
  - Xiongzhai subdialect 织金熊寨土语: spoken in Qiaoshang Village 桥上村, Xiongjiazhai Township 熊家寨乡, Longchang District 龙场区, Zhijin County 织金县.
- North-Central 黔中北方言 (14,000 speakers)
  - Subdialect 1: spoken in Yatang 亚塘, Maoba District 茅坝区, Renhuai City 仁怀县; and Shanbeihou Village 山背后村, Liangshui Township 凉水, Qinglong County; and Sanchong 三冲, Longlin County 隆林县, Guangxi (autonym: hɑ53 ke53). Also spoken by the Green Gelao 青仡佬 of Yangliu Village 杨柳村, Renhuai City 仁怀县 (autonym: pu55 hɑ55 kei53).
  - Subdialect 2: spoken by the Red Gelao 红仡佬 of Banliwan 板栗湾, Maoba District 茅坝区, Renhuai City 仁怀县; and some villages of Pingzheng Township 平正乡, Zunyi County 遵义县 (autonym: pu55 mu33 hen55, where mu33 hen55 means 'people'), including in Tianba 田坝, Heijiaoyan 黑脚岩, Pingzheng Township.
- Southwestern 黔西南方言 (12,000 speakers)
  - Niupo subdialect 六枝牛破土语: spoken in Duoque 堕脚, Houzitian 猴子田, and Langjiaba 郎家坝 of Liuzhi Special District 六枝特区; Shangguan 上关 and Xiaguan 下关 in Yingpan Town 营盘镇, Machang District 马场区, Puding County 普定县 (elderly rememberers only); some villages in Agong District 阿弓区, Zhijin County 织金县.
  - Moji subdialect 隆林么基土语: spoken in Dashuijing 大水井, Longlin County 隆林县, Guangxi and other nearby villages. 400 speakers.
  - Laozhai subdialect 麻栗坡县老寨土语: spoken in Laozhai 老寨 and Yueliangwan 月亮湾 in Tiechang District 铁厂区, Malipo County 麻栗坡县
  - Datiezhai subdialect 水城大铁寨土语: spoken in Gaoshi Township 高石乡, Yangmei District 杨梅区 and Ega Township 俄嘎乡, Miluo District 米箩区, Shuicheng County 水城特区 (elderly rememberers only).
  - Jianshan subdialect 遵义尖山土语: spoken in Jianshan 尖山, Pingzheng Township 平正乡, Zunyi County 遵义县. Under 500 speakers.
- Western 黔西方言 (15,000 speakers)
  - Pudi subdialect 大方县普底土语: spoken in Hongfeng Village 红丰村, Pudi Township 普底乡, Dafang County (autonym: pu55 ɣɯ55); Lannigou 滥泥沟, Shajing Township 沙井乡, Qianxi County; a few villages in Daguan District 大观区, Qianxi County; Dazhai 大寨 and Gaokanzhai 高坎寨 in Fenghuang Village 凤凰村, Xinfa Township 新发乡, Qingzhen City; Maixiang 麦巷 and Houzhai 后寨 townships, Qingzhen City
  - Bigong subdialect 镇宁比贡土语: spoken in Bigong Village 比贡村 and Maocao 茅草 in Mafang Township 新房乡, Anxi District 安西区, Zhenning County 镇宁县 (autonym: zəɯ35)

=== Bradley (2007), He (1983) ===
The Encyclopedia of the World's Endangered Languages (2007), based on information from He (1983), groups Gelao into five subdivisions.

- Hakhi (哈给 Hagei, ha53 kei33, Green Gelao): west-central Guizhou, western Guangxi, southeastern Yunnan, northern Vietnam - including Yangliu (杨柳) variety in Renhuai County; southwestern Gelao of Sanchong (三冲) and Qinglong (青龙). Hagei varieties are also spoken in Ma'ao (麻凹村), Guanling County (关岭县), Pomao (坡帽) in Zhenfeng County (贞丰县), and Pingzheng Gelao Village (平正仡佬族乡), Zunyi (遵义). Estimated by Jiashan He (1983) at 1,700 speakers. He (1983) also lists Anliang 安良 and Taiyang 太阳 of Renhuai 仁怀县, Huajiangzhen 花江镇 and Ma'ao 麻垇 of Zhenning 镇宁县, Dingying 顶营 of Guanling 关岭县, Maixiang 麦巷 near Qingzhen 清镇, and Liangshuiying 凉水营 of Qinglong 晴隆县 as Hagei-speaking places.
- Tolo (多罗 Duoluo, to31 ʔlo5, White Gelao): west-central Guizhou, western Guangxi, southeastern Yunnan, northern Vietnam; all other southwestern Gelao varieties. The Niupo variety is also spoken in Machang village (马场镇), Puding County (普定县), Anshun, as well as Agong village (阿弓镇), Zhijin County (织金县), Bijie. The Datiezhai variety is spoken in Gaoshi (高石) of Shuicheng (水城) and Miluo (米箩) of Shuicheng (水城). Estimated by Jiashan He (1983) at 1,200 speakers.
- A-uo (阿欧 A'ou/Ao, Red Gelao): west-central Guizhou, western Guangxi, southeastern Yunnan, northern Vietnam - including Banli (板栗湾) variety in Renhuai County; all northern Gelao varieties, as well as southwestern Gelao of Puding County (普定县) and Maocaozhai (茅草寨), Zhijin County (织金县). Estimated by Jiashan He (1983) at 1,500 speakers. He (1983) also lists Shawo 沙窝, Xinkaitian 新开田, Lannigou 滥泥沟 (all in Qianxi 黔西县) as A'ou-speaking places.
- Aqao (稿 Gao): west-central Guizhou; all central Gelao varieties. Estimated by Jiashan He (1983) at 2,000 speakers. He (1983) also listed Dongkou 洞口 of Shuicheng 水城县 and Niudong 牛洞 of Zhijin 织金县 as Gao-speaking places.
- Qaw: Gulin County (古蔺县), Sichuan; mostly unattested. This dialect is spoken by the Yi (羿人), who are the least-known Gelao subgroup. Others speculate it may be an isolate.

The most extensively studied varieties are the Wanzi and Zhenfeng dialects, while the most endangered one is Red Gelao.

=== Zhou (2004) ===
Zhou (2004) lists four dialects of Gelao.

- Hagei (哈给): Autonyms include pu42 ha35 kei42 (布哈给) and pu55 mu33 hen55 (布目亨). Primarily spoken in Renhuai, Zhenning, Guanling, Qinglong, Zhenfeng, and Longlin Counties.
  - Pomao 坡帽村, Zhenfeng 贞丰县
- Duoluo (多罗): Autonyms include to31ʔ lo35 and tə31ʔ lɯ33. Primarily spoken in Liuzhi District, Puding, Longlin, and Malipo Counties.
  - Qingkou 箐口彝族仡佬族布依族乡, Liuzhi 六枝特区
  - Machang 马场寨, Puding (extinct)
  - Mengzhou 猛舟村, Puding (extinct)
- Gao (稿): Autonyms include pəɯ55 klɑu55, pəu35 qɑu35 (in Dongkou 垌口村, Houchang Township 猴场乡), and pəu35 lɑu31. Primarily spoken in Pingba, Anshun, Puding, and Shuicheng Counties. Its 4 dialects are Dagouchang 大狗场 of Pingba, Xinzhai 新寨 of Puding, Dongkou 洞口 of Shuicheng, and Xiongzhai 熊寨 of Zhijin (extinct).
  - Dongkou 垌口村, Houchang 猴场乡, Shuicheng 水城县
  - Shuangkeng 双坑村, Puding
- A'ou (阿欧): Autonyms include a33 ɣeu33 (阿欧), pu42 ɣeu33 (补欧, 补尔), and zəu31 le31 (柔勒). Small pockets of speakers left in Zhenning, Dafang, and Qianxi Counties. Its three dialects are Bigong, Hongfeng, and Jianshan.
  - Shajing 沙井苗族彝族仡佬族乡: Tiele 铁乐村, Dengming 灯明村, Huangni 黄泥村
  - Huashi 化石, Qianxi
  - Yang'er 羊儿, Qianxi
  - Longjia 龙家寨, Zhijin
  - Mengjia 猛架, Puding
  - Weicheng 卫城镇, Qingzhen 清镇市
  - Maixiang 麦巷村, Qingzhen 清镇市
  - Pingzheng 平正仡佬族乡 (some villages, including Shibanshang 石板上, also called Jianshan 尖山)
  - Bayang 坝养, Puding (extinct)

=== Wei (2008) ===
Wei Mingying (2008:45) classifies the Gelao dialects as follows.

- Duoluo 多罗
  - Vietnam White Gelao 越白
  - Yueliangwan 月亮湾, Laozhai 老寨
  - Judu 居都, Moji 磨基, Wantao 湾桃
- Gao 稿
  - Dongkou 洞口, Datiezhai 打铁寨
  - Xinzhai 新寨
  - Wanzi 湾子, Dagouchang 大狗场
- Hagei 哈给
  - Sanchong 三冲, Shanbeihou 山背后, Ma'ao 麻垇, Pomao 坡帽, Yangliu 杨柳, Tianba 田坝, Vietnam Green Gelao 越青
- A'ou 阿欧
  - Banliwan 板栗湾
  - Jianshan 尖山, Malipo Red Gelao 麻红, Vietnam Red Gelao 越红
  - Hongfeng 红丰, Maixiang 麦巷, Longjiazhai 龙家寨, Houzitian 猴子田
  - Qiaoshang 桥上, Longli 龙里

Wei (2008: 39–40) classifies the A'ou (Red Gelao) dialects as follows.

A'ou 阿欧方言

- Lectal area 1 第一次方言
  - Longjiazhai-Houzitian dialect 龙家寨、猴子田土语
- Lectal area 2 第二次方言
  - Qiaoshang dialect 桥上土语
  - Longli dialect 龙里土语
  - Bigong dialect 比贡土语
- Lectal area 3 第三次方言
  - Jianshan dialect 尖山土语
  - Banliwan dialect 板栗湾土语

Wei (2008: 39) considers Houzitian 猴子田 Red Gelao to be most closely related to the Gelao variety of Longjiazhai 龙家寨, northern Zhijin County. There are only about 10 ethnic Gelao households in Houzitian. The Gelao speakers of "Donie" do31 ȵe31 village, Aga Township 阿嘎乡, Shuicheng County 水城县 originally migrated from Houzitian several decades ago; there are only a few elderly rememberers of that variety left.

=== Hsiu (2013, 2019) ===
Hsiu (2019) classifies the Gelao language dialects as follows.

- Gelao
  - Red Gelao
    - Vandu
      - Vietnam (Vandu) [50 speakers]
      - Malipo 麻栗坡 (Uwei) [1 speaker]
      - Jianshan 尖山 (Pumuhen) [extinct]
      - Banliwan 板栗湾 [extinct?]
    - Dingjiapo 丁加坡 (?) [extinct]
    - A'ou
      - Mulao [extinct]
        - Majiang 麻江
        - Kaili 凯里
      - Yiren 羿人 [extinct]
      - Hongfeng cluster
        - Hongfeng 红丰 [30 speakers]
        - Qingzhen 清镇 [nearly extinct]
        - Shajing 沙井 [extinct?]
      - Houzitian-Longjiazhai
        - Houzitian 猴子田 [extinct?; 1 speaker as of 2012]
        - Longjiazhai 龙家寨 [extinct?]
      - Qiaoshang 桥上 [extinct?]
      - Bigong 比贡 [30 speakers]
  - Core Gelao
    - Dongkou Gelao 洞口 [3 speakers]
    - White Gelao (Telue)
      - Judu 居都 [1,000+ speakers], Moji 磨基 [5 speakers]
      - Malipo 麻栗坡, Vietnam
    - Central Gelao
      - Hakei [1,000+ speakers]
        - Renhuai 仁怀, Pingzheng 平正
        - Guanling-Qinglong cluster
        - Pomao 坡帽
        - Sanchong 三冲
        - Vietnam
      - Qau [~1,000 speakers]
        - Wanzi 湾子, Dagouchang 大狗场
        - Xinzhai 新寨

An earlier classification by Hsiu (2013) classifies the Gelao dialects as follows.

- Gelao
  - Red Gelao
    - Border (“Vandu”)
      - Malipo 麻栗坡 (Uwei)
      - Hà Giang: Vandu, Wandei
      - Renhuai: Banliwan 板栗湾, Jianshan 尖山
    - Core (Proto-Kra retroflex > spirant innovation)
      - Bigong 比贡
      - Hongfeng 红丰, Shajing 沙井
      - Houzitian 猴子田
      - Zhijin: Qiaoshang 桥上, Longchang 龙场
      - Mulao
      - Yiren 羿人
  - White Gelao
    - Core
      - Judu 居都
      - Moji 磨基, Wantao 湾桃
    - Border: Yueliangwan 月亮湾, Fengyan 峰岩, Laozhai 老寨, Vietnam White Gelao
  - Central Gelao
    - Hakei
      - Guanling-Qinglong cluster: Ma'ao 麻垇, etc.
      - Pomao 坡帽
    - Qau
      - Dagouchang 大狗场
      - Wanzi 湾子
      - Xinzhai 新寨
      - Dongkou 洞口

== Phonology ==
Many Gelao varieties, such as Telue and Vandu, have many uvular and prenasalized consonants. Many varieties also preserve consonant clusters that have been lost in most other related languages. These consonant clusters, such as pl, bl, pʰl, ml, mpl, vl, and kl, correspond regularly with consonants in Lachi, Mulao, Qabiao (Pubiao), Buyang, and various Kam–Tai languages. Gelao also shares many phonological features with Bouyei and other neighboring non-Kra languages.

=== Tones ===
Gelao varieties are tonal. Tones can include level tones (3 and 5), rising tones (13 and 35), and falling tones (31 and 53).

=== Comparisons ===
Sound correspondences between the Liuzhi (六枝) and Zhenfeng (贞丰) varieties include:

Liuzhi	Zhenfeng
pl	pj
pʰl	p
ml	m
mp	m
ntɕ	ȵ (Note: Alternatively transcribed as ɲ)
ŋk	ŋ or k

== Grammar ==
Like all of its surrounding languages, Gelao is a head-first, SVO language. Like Buyang, one unusual feature of Gelao is that negatives usually come at the end of a sentence. Reduplication is very common and is used for diminutive or repetitive purposes. Other common features include the use of serial verb constructions and compound nouns. Although numerals and classifiers precede nouns, adjectives (including demonstratives) always follow the noun. Function words, such as prepositions and auxiliary words, are often derived from verbs.

Like Buyang and Dong, Gelao retains many prefixes that have been lost in most other Kra–Dai languages. Zhang (1993:300) notes that the Moji (磨基) Longlin dialect of White Gelao makes especially extensive use of prefixing syllables before nouns, verbs, and adjectives. These prefixes are especially important for reconstruction purposes.

Many words in Gelao are derived from vernacular Southwest Mandarin Chinese. These loanwords are often used interchangeably with native Gelao words. There is also a highly rich system of classifiers.

Gelao also has a rich set of pronouns not attested in other Kra–Dai languages. There are also pronouns referring to one's household in particular.

== Manuscripts ==
In Guizhou, there are several manuscripts that have word lists of Gelao varieties written using Chinese characters.

In 2009, a book allegedly written in a native Gelao script was found in Guizhou, China, but scholarship reveals it is certainly fake.
