= Mulao language (Kra) =

Kra language spoken in China

Mulao
- Native to: China
- Region: Guizhou
- Ethnicity: Mulao
- Extinct: 2010s
- Language family: Kra–Dai: Kra; Ge–Chi; Gelao; Mulao

Language codes
- ISO 639-3: giu
- Glottolog: gela1264
- ELP: Mulao

Mulao (simplified Chinese: 木佬语; traditional Chinese: 木佬語; pinyin: Mùlǎoyǔ), also known as Ayo, is a possibly extinct Kra language spoken in Guizhou, China. Spoken in Longli County and Majiang County in Guizhou, it is estimated that the language may be extinct or have only have a few living speakers. As of 2011, there are no newspapers, radio programs, or television broadcasts in the language, and it is not recognized by the government, nor taught in schools. Mulao speakers are classified as Gelao people by the government of China, but Mulao speakers do not understand the Gelao languages. It is closely related to A'ou.

== Demographics ==
The Mulao number 28,000 people, and are distributed in Majiang, Kaili, Huangping, Duyun, Weng'an, Fuquan, and other counties of southeastern Guizhou. The Mulao of Xuanwei and Jidong villages refer to themselves as the Mu, and in Longli village (龙里寨) they call themselves qa24 ɣo53. Luo (1997) describes the two Mulao varieties of qa24 o53 (qa24 ɣo53) in Majiang County and lei35 wo33 in Kaili City. One dialect is represented by the datapoints of Bamaozhai (巴茅寨) and Madizhai (马碲寨) of Xuanwei District (宣威区), Majiang County (Luo 1997:105, 115), and the other by Bailazhai (白腊寨), Lushan (炉山镇), Kaili City (Luo 1997:189); the latter is also spoken in Dafengdong (大风洞), Pingliang (平良), and Chong'anjiang (重安江).

The last speaker in Longli County was recorded by Bo Wenze (2003).

== Documentation ==
Monographs of Mulao include Bo (2003) and Luo (1997). A word list is also given in Zhang (1993).

Mulao data from Majiang and Kaili is also given in Guizhou (1985).

== Phonology ==
=== Consonants ===
		Labial	Alveolar		(Alveolo-) palatal	Velar	Uvular	Glottal
		Labial	plain	lateral	(Alveolo-) palatal	Velar	Uvular	Glottal
Nasal		m	n		ɲ̟	ŋ		
Stop	voiceless	p	t			k	q	
Stop	aspirated	pʰ	tʰ			kʰ	qʰ	
Affricate	voiceless		ts		tɕ			
Affricate	aspirated		tsʰ		tɕʰ			
Fricative	voiceless	f	s	ɬ	ɕ	x		h
Fricative	voiced	v	z		ʑ	ɣ		
Approximant		(w)		l	(j)			

- /h/ only occurs rarely.
- Sounds /v, ʑ/ may occasionally be heard as semivowels [w, j] in intervocalic positions.

=== Vowels ===
	Front		Central	Back	
Close	i	y		ɯ	u
Mid	e	ø	ə	o	
Open			a		

- /n/ can be heard as a final [-n] in the diphthong /en/. /ŋ/ can be heard as a final [-ŋ] in the diphthongs /iŋ, eŋ, aŋ, əŋ, uŋ/.

=== Tones ===
Mulao is a Tonal language with 5 tones.

Tone	Value	Example	Meaning
1	55	a55	not
2	33	uŋ33	Water
3	24	so24	nine
4	53	ve53	ten
5	31	ɣa31	mountain
