= Tân Quang =

- Commune
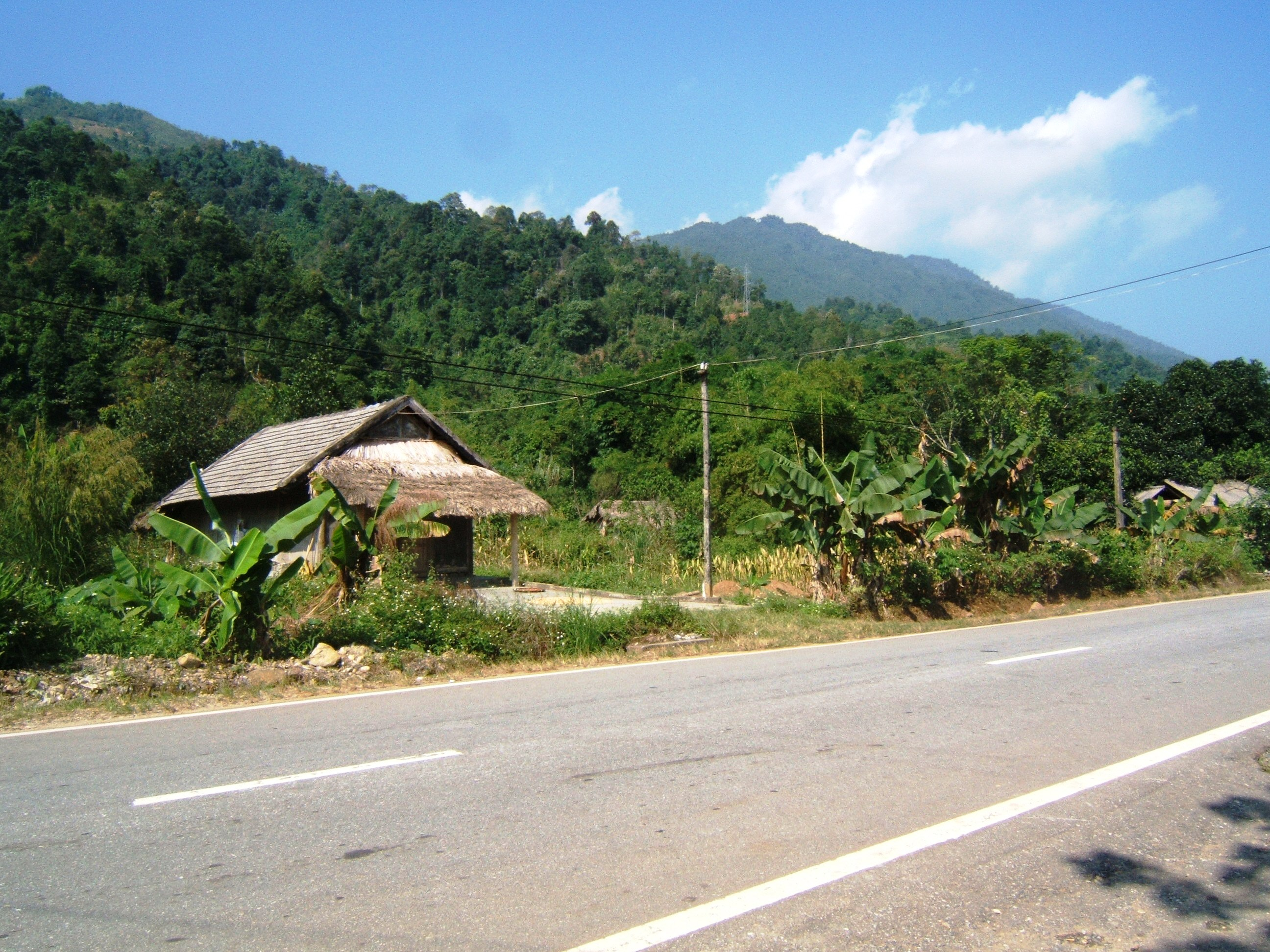
- National Route 2A through Tân Quang commune
- Interactive map of Tân Quang
- Coordinates: 22°29′53″N 104°52′14″E
- Country: Vietnam
- Province: Tuyên Quang
- Region: Northeast
- Seat: Thôn Xuân Hoà

Area
  - Total: 174.14 km^{2} (67.24 sq mi)

Population (2025)
  - Total: 12,425
  - Density: 71/km^{2} (180/sq mi)

Tân Quang is a commune in Tuyên Quang province, Vietnam.

== History ==
On 12 June 2025, the National Assembly of Vietnam adopted Resolution No. 202/2025/QH15 on the reorganization of provincial-level administrative units. Under the resolution, the entire area and population of Hà Giang province were incorporated into Tuyên Quang province. Tân Quang commune consequently became part of Tuyên Quang province.

On 16 June 2025, the Standing Committee of the National Assembly of Vietnam issued Resolution No. 1684/NQ-UBTVQH15 on the reorganization of commune-level administrative units in Tuyên Quang province in 2025. Under the resolution, the entire area and population of the former communes of Tân Thành, Tân Lập, and Tân Quang in Bắc Quang district were consolidated to form a new commune named Tân Quang.
