= Xín Mần district =

Coordinates: 22°40′N 104°35′E

Xín Mần District Huyện Xín Mần
- District
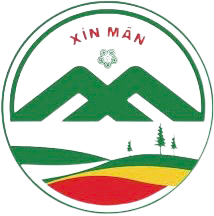
- Seal
- Interactive map of Xín Mần District
- Country: Vietnam
- Region: Northeast
- Province: Hà Giang
- Capital: Cốc Pài

Area
  - Total: 225 sq mi (582 km^{2})

Population (2019)
  - Total: 67,999
- Time zone: UTC+7 (Indochina Time)

Xín Mần is a former rural district of Hà Giang province in the Northeast region of Vietnam. As of 2019 the district had a population of 67,999. The district covers an area of 582 km^{2}. Its capital lies at Cốc Pài.

== History ==
Its name Xín Mần or Sín Mằn (old) was from Hmong name Hsing-màn, what means "the blue clouds".

== Administrative divisions ==
Xín Mần District consists of the district capital, Cốc Pài, and 17 communes: Bản Díu, Bản Ngò, Chế Là, Chí Cà, Cốc Rế, Khuôn Lùng, Nà Chì, Nấm Dẩn, Nàn Ma, Nàn Xỉn, Pà Vầy Sủ, Quảng Nguyên, Tả Nhìu, Thèn Phàng, Thu Tà, Trung Thịnh and Xín Mần.
