= Hagei language =

Kra language spoken in China and Vietnam

Hagei
- Green Gelao
- Native to: China and Vietnam
- Region: Guizhou, Guangxi, Yunnan; Ha Giang Province
- Native speakers: 300 (2002)
- Language family: Kra–Dai: Kra; Ge–Chi; Gelao; Hagei

Language codes
- ISO 639-3: giq
- Glottolog: gree1278
- ELP: Green Gelao

Hagei (Hakei) or Green Gelao (Chinese: 青仡佬; sometimes translated as Blue Gelao) is a Gelao language spoken in China and Vietnam.

== Dialects ==
The primary dialectal areas where Hagei (Green Gelao) is still spoken are:

- Guizhou: in Guanling County, Qinglong County, and Zhenfeng County
- Guangxi: in Sanchong 三冲 village, Longlin County
- Vietnam: in Hà Giang Province

The Hagei varieties of northern Guizhou, such as in Zunyi, are extinct.

== Phonology ==
=== Consonants ===
		Labial			Alveolar			Retroflex		(Alveolo-) palatal	Velar		Glottal	
		plain	pal.	lab.	plain	pal.	lab.	plain	lab.	(Alveolo-) palatal	plain	lab.	plain	lab.
Stop	voiceless	p	pʲ	pʷ	t	tʲ	tʷ				k	kʷ	ʔ	
Stop	aspirated	pʰ	pʲʰ	pʰʷ	tʰ		tʰʷ				kʰ	kʷʰ		
Stop	voiced	b			d	dʲ					ɡ			
Affricate	voiceless				ts		tsʷ	tʂ	tʂʷ	tɕ				
Affricate	aspirated				tsʰ		tsʰʷ		tʂʰʷ	tɕʰ				
Affricate	voiced				dz			dʐ		dʑ				
Fricative	voiceless	f			s			ʂ	ʂʷ	ɕ			h	hʷ
Fricative	voiced	v			z			ʐ	ʐʷ	ʑ				
Nasal	voiceless	m̥			n̥					ɲ̊	ŋ̊			
Nasal	voiced	m	mʲ	mʷ	n					ɲ	ŋ			
Nasal	glottalized	mˀ									ŋˀ			
Lateral	voiceless				l̥									
Lateral	Voicevoiced				l	lʲ								
Lateral	glottalized				lˀ									
Approximant										j		w		

- Consonant clusters may include /pl, bl/ and /ps, pz/.

=== Vowels ===
	Front	Central	Back
Close	i	z̞	u
Mid	e	ə	o
Open		a	
Syllabic	m̩	n̩	

- /z̞/ is typically centralized and may also be heard as a syllabic retroflex [ʐ̩] or a central [ɨ].
