= Lachi people =

La Chi
Total population
- Vietnam 15,126 (2019)

Regions with significant populations
- Vietnam: Hà Giang, Lào Cai; China: Yunnan

Languages
- La Chi • Vietnamese

The La Chi people (Vietnamese: Người La Chí; also Cù Tê or La Quả) live in the Hà Giang and Lào Cai provinces of northeastern Vietnam. Their population is 15,126 people (2019). They speak the Lachi language, which is part of the Tai–Kadai language group.

Their ancestor is Hoàng Dìn Thùng. They put aside the most fertilized field for growing cotton plant and strobilanthes flaccidifolius nees plant. They sing ní ca and celebrate the Khu Cù Tê Festival in 7th month of the lunar year.

== Population ==
The Lachi people mainly live in Bản Phùng, Bản Díu và Bản Máy communes of Ha Giang province and some other localities in Lao Cao province.

Some Lachi reside in China (in Maguan County, Yunnan) but are designated as Zhuang people by the government. Around 1,600 Lachi live in China according to a 2000 estimate.

== Names ==
Lachi groups call themselves by various names, including the following (Hoang 2012:13).

- Cù Tè
- Ý Pi
- Ý Tó
- Ý Poong
- Ý Mia

Other groups call the Lachi (Hoang 2012:13):

- Black Thổ
- Mán La Chí
- Xá
