= Vandu language =

Kra language spoken in Vietnam

Vandu
- Native to: Vietnam
- Region: Ha Giang Province
- Native speakers: (50 cited 1997)
- Language family: Kra–Dai: Kra; Ge–Chi; Gelao; Vandu

Language codes
- ISO 639-3: gir
- Glottolog: redg1235
- ELP: Red Gelao

Vandu or Red Gelao is an endangered Gelao language spoken in two villages of Ha Giang Province, Vietnam. 1–2 speakers have also been located across the border in Malipo County, Yunnan, China.

Samarina (2011), which includes lengthy word lists and audio recordings, is the most detailed linguistic description to date.

== Speakers ==
As the most endangered Gelao language variety, Red Gelao of Vietnam (not to be confused with A'ou of Guizhou, China, which is also referred to as Red Gelao) is spoken by only about 50 people. Many speakers have shifted to Southwestern Mandarin or Hmong. The Red Gelao people, who call themselves the va35 ntɯ31, send brides back and forth among the villages of Na Khê and Bạch Đích (or Bìch Đich) in Yên Minh District, Hà Giang Province, Vietnam and another village in Fanpo, Malipo County, Yunnan, China (autonym: u33 wei55) in order to ensure the continual survival of their ethnic group. Edmondson (1998) reports that there are also Red Gelao people in Cán Tí, Quản Bạ District and Túng Sán, Hoàng Su Phì District who no longer speak any Gelao, and speak Hmong, Tay, or Vietnamese instead. Hoang (2013:12) reports that there also some Red Gelao in Vĩnh Hảo commune, Bắc Quang District who had moved from Túng Sán commune.
