= Majiang County =

Majiang County 麻江县 Makiang
- County
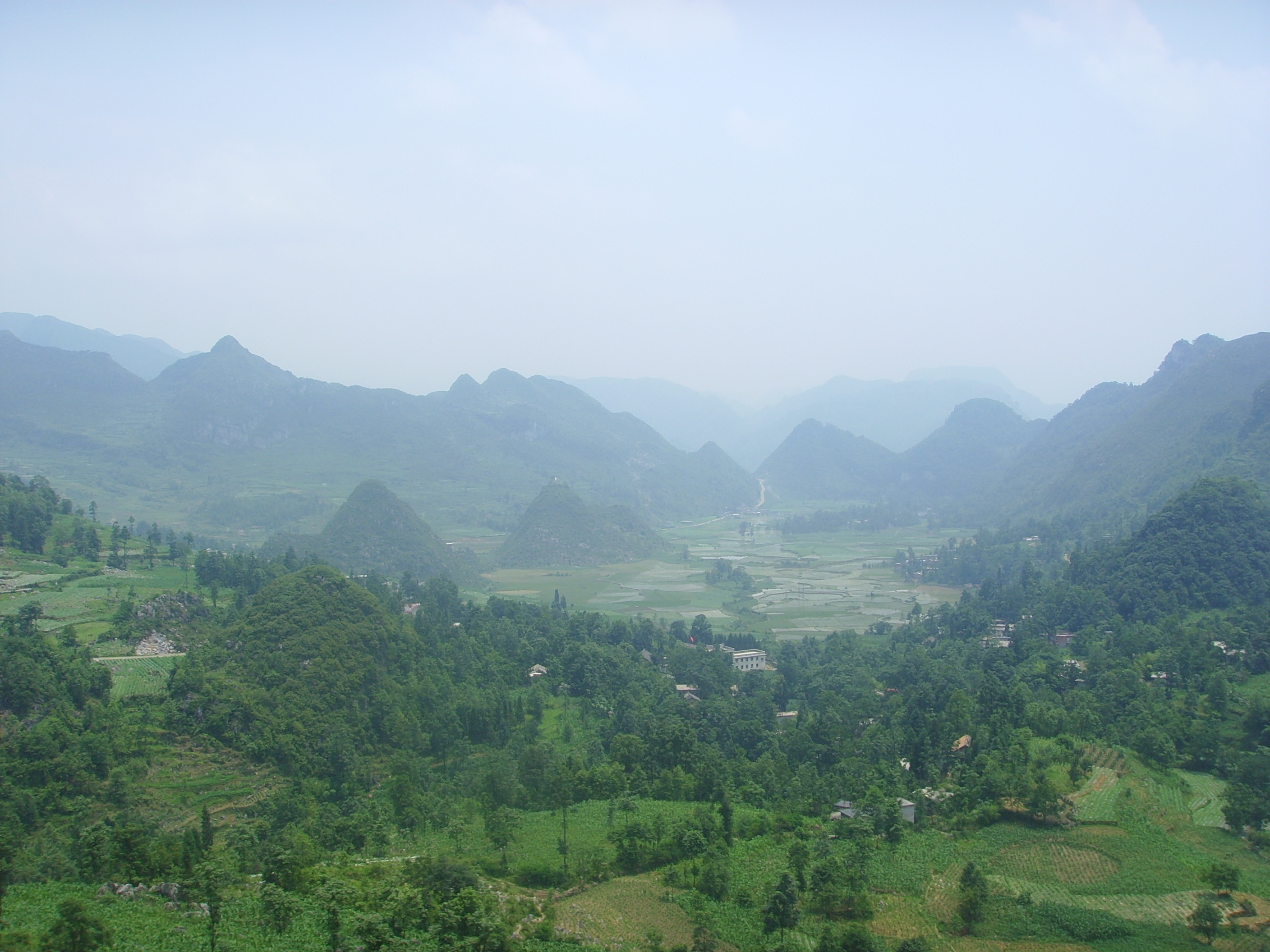

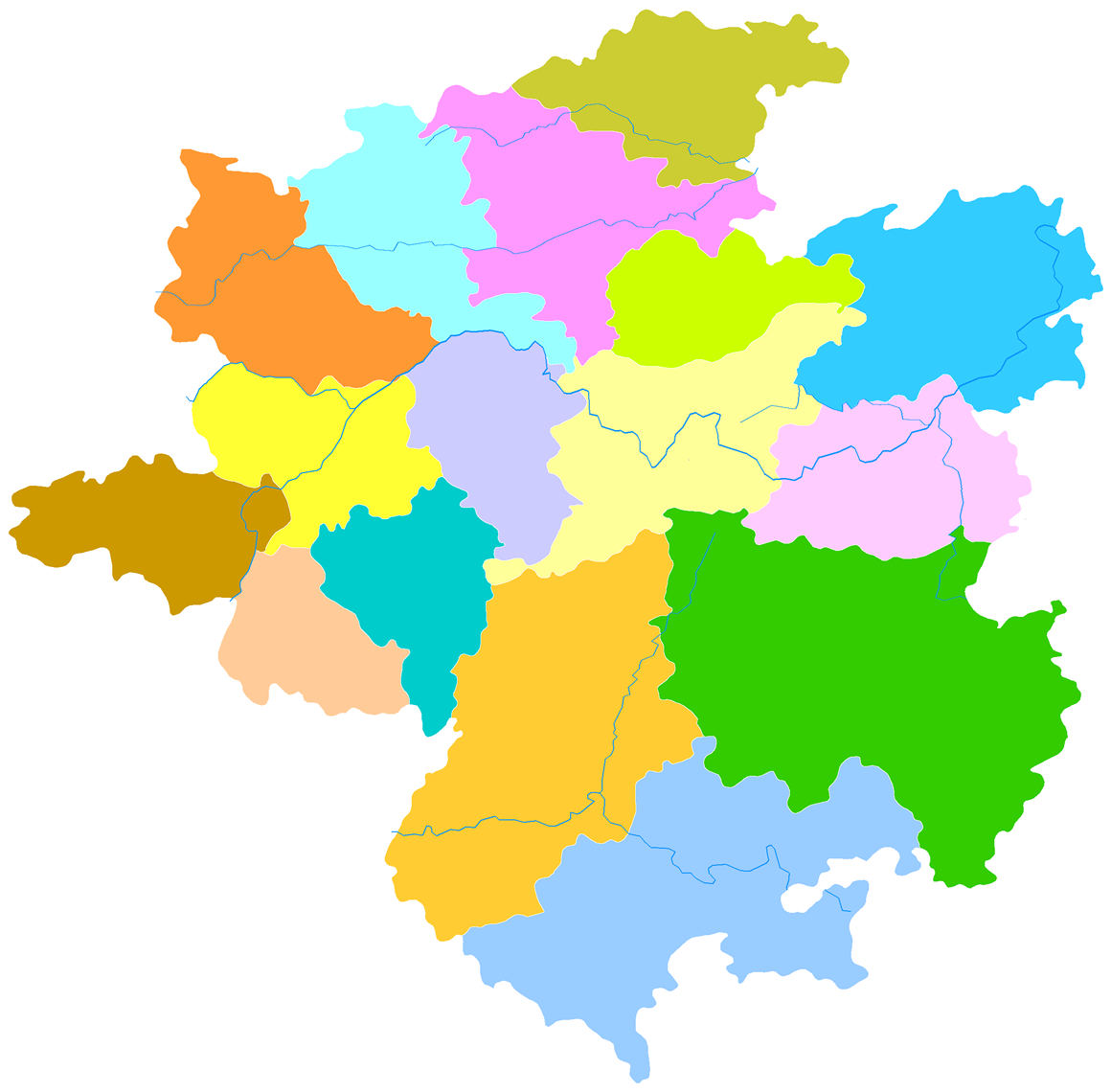
- Majiang is the westernmost division in this map of Qiandongnan

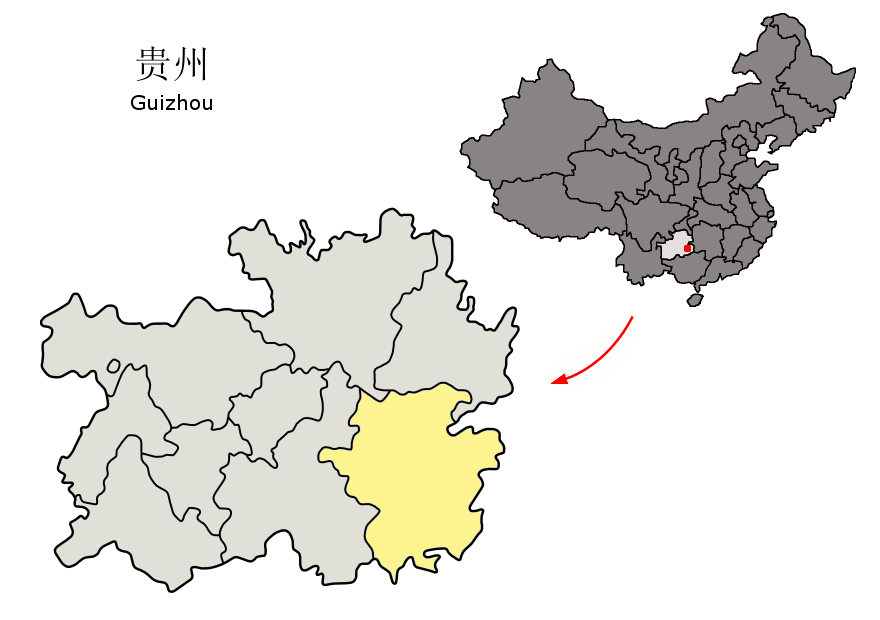
- Qiandongnan in Guizhou
- Coordinates (Majiang County government): 26°29′29″N 107°35′22″E
- Country: China
- Province: Guizhou
- Autonomous prefecture: Qiandongnan
- County seat: Xingshan

Area
  - Total: 1,222 km^{2} (472 sq mi)

Population (2010)
  - Total: 167,596
  - Density: 137.1/km^{2} (355.2/sq mi)
- Time zone: UTC+8 (China Standard)

Majiang County (Chinese: 麻江县; pinyin: Májiāng Xiàn) is a county of southeast-central Guizhou province, China. It is the westernmost county-level division of the Qiandongnan Miao and Dong Autonomous Prefecture.

== Administrative divisions ==
Majiang County is divided into 2 subdistricts, 4 towns and 1 ethnic township:

subdistrict

- Xingshan Subdistrict 杏山街道
- Jinzhu Subdistrict 金竹街道

towns

- Gudong Town 谷硐镇
- Xuanwei Town 宣威镇
- Longshan Town 龙山镇
- Xianchang Town 贤昌镇

ethnic township

- Bamang Bouyei Ethnic Township 坝芒布依族乡

== Languages ==
Languages spoken in Majiang County include Dongjia, Raojia, and Mulao. The Yao of Heba (河坝) speak an Raojia.

== Demographics ==
Ethnic Mulao are located in the following villages. They are called "Ka" (卡) by the Raojia and "Kabie" (卡别) by the Miao.

- Jidong Township (基东乡): Wengpao (瓮袍), Wengchang (瓮偿), An'e (安鹅), Jidong (基东)
- Xiasi Township (下司镇): Wenggang (瓮港), Dapo (大坡)
- Longshan Township (龙山乡): Fuxing (复兴)
- Bibo Township (碧波乡): Xinpai (新牌)

The Raojia (also called Tianjia 天家 or Tian Miao 天苗) live in the townships of Heba (河坝) and Longshan (龙山) (in 23 natural villages, inside 6 administrative villages). The Dongjia are distributed in 250 natural villages, inside 35 administrative villages and 12 townships.

== Climate ==
Climate data for Majiang, elevation 984 m (3,228 ft), (1991–2020 normals, extremes 1981–present)
Month	Jan	Feb	Mar	Apr	May	Jun	Jul	Aug	Sep	Oct	Nov	Dec	Year
Record high °C (°F)	21.8 (71.2)	28.9 (84.0)	31.6 (88.9)	33.2 (91.8)	33.2 (91.8)	32.4 (90.3)	34.1 (93.4)	34.5 (94.1)	33.3 (91.9)	30.5 (86.9)	27.4 (81.3)	23.8 (74.8)	34.5 (94.1)
Mean daily maximum °C (°F)	6.7 (44.1)	10.1 (50.2)	14.4 (57.9)	20.1 (68.2)	23.5 (74.3)	25.6 (78.1)	27.8 (82.0)	28.1 (82.6)	25.0 (77.0)	19.6 (67.3)	15.3 (59.5)	9.6 (49.3)	18.8 (65.9)
Daily mean °C (°F)	3.8 (38.8)	6.4 (43.5)	10.2 (50.4)	15.5 (59.9)	19.3 (66.7)	21.9 (71.4)	23.8 (74.8)	23.5 (74.3)	20.5 (68.9)	15.7 (60.3)	11.3 (52.3)	6.0 (42.8)	14.8 (58.7)
Mean daily minimum °C (°F)	1.8 (35.2)	4.0 (39.2)	7.5 (45.5)	12.5 (54.5)	16.2 (61.2)	19.3 (66.7)	21.0 (69.8)	20.4 (68.7)	17.3 (63.1)	13.1 (55.6)	8.5 (47.3)	3.6 (38.5)	12.1 (53.8)
Record low °C (°F)	−6.9 (19.6)	−6.2 (20.8)	−4.2 (24.4)	1.6 (34.9)	6.4 (43.5)	11.4 (52.5)	13.0 (55.4)	13.9 (57.0)	9.4 (48.9)	3.0 (37.4)	−4.3 (24.3)	−6.6 (20.1)	−6.9 (19.6)
Average precipitation mm (inches)	43.9 (1.73)	40.0 (1.57)	73.7 (2.90)	105.4 (4.15)	199.4 (7.85)	266.0 (10.47)	222.3 (8.75)	114.6 (4.51)	122.1 (4.81)	99.6 (3.92)	60.1 (2.37)	34.4 (1.35)	1,381.5 (54.38)
Average precipitation days (≥ 0.1 mm)	17.9	15.6	18.7	18.6	18.7	18.7	16.4	14.3	12.6	15.4	12.7	13.4	193
Average snowy days	5.4	2.6	0.7	0.1	0	0	0	0	0	0	0.1	1.8	10.7
Average relative humidity (%)	85	83	84	82	83	85	83	81	81	84	82	81	83
Mean monthly sunshine hours	32.3	46.5	64.3	88.7	102.5	83.5	147.0	161.4	119.1	83.0	80.0	57.7	1,066
Percentage possible sunshine	10	15	17	23	25	20	35	40	33	23	25	18	24
Source: China Meteorological Administration
