= ISO 639:gsw =

The ISO 639-3 code gsw refers to the Alemannic varieties:

- Alsatian, Alemannic dialects spoken in most of Alsace
- Swiss German, Alemannic dialects spoken in the German-speaking part of Switzerland and some Alpine communities in Northern Italy
