= Pà Vầy Sủ =

Pà Vầy Sủ Xã Pà Vầy Sủ
- Commune
- Pà Vầy Sủ commune
- Location within Vietnam
- Coordinates: 22°40′56″N 104°27′43″E
- Country: Vietnam
- Region: Northeast
- Province: Tuyên Quang
- Time zone: UTC+7 (UTC + 7)

Pà Vầy Sủ is a commune (xã) of Tuyên Quang Province, Vietnam.

The entire natural area and population of Cốc Pài Township and the communes of Nàn Ma, Bản Ngò, and Pà Vầy Sủ are rearranged to form a new commune named Pà Vầy Sủ Commune.

== History ==
Its name Cốc Pài was originally formed from the wrong writing of the French tourist maps in the early 20th century, that is, the time when this township was not yet established but still a deserted valley. Meanwhile, it was called as Cốc Phẩy by local residents. This is a Hmong word but source from the Kinh language, a rare phenomenon in Annam or Vietnam before, because most of the residents here are descendants of the low-level merchants from the Red River Delta to settlement after French victory to the Qing Dynasty. It means Gốc Phay, or "the duabanga trees".
