= Jerold A. Edmondson =

American linguist (1941–2023)

- Born: Jerold Alan Edmondson; September 30, 1941; Plainfield, Indiana, U.S.
- Died: August 26, 2023 (aged 81); Arlington, Texas, U.S.
- Occupation: Linguist

Academic background
- Education: University of California, Los Angeles

Academic work
- Institutions: University of Texas at Arlington
- Main interests: Languages of Southeast Asia

Jerold Alan Edmondson (Chinese name: 艾杰瑞 Aì Jiéruì, September 30, 1941 – August 27, 2023) was an American linguist. His work spans four subdisciplines: historical and comparative linguistics, East Asian linguistics, field linguistics, and phonetics. He was a leading specialist in Tai–Kadai languages of East Asia, especially the Kam–Sui and Kra branches.

== Life and career ==
Edmondson was born in Plainfield, Indiana. He earned his PhD in Germanic Languages from UCLA in 1973 and a Habilitation in General Linguistics from Technische Universität Berlin in 1979. He was an Assistant Professor of English and General Linguistics at Technische Universität Berlin from 1976 to 1980. He joined the faculty of the University of Texas at Arlington in 1981 and went on to attain the rank of Professor, becoming a Professor Emeritus in 2011. As founding director of the Program in Linguistics from 1991 to 1999, he shepherded its growth into the current Department of Linguistics and TESOL. Edmondson earned many accolades while at UT Arlington, including the Outstanding Research Award, the Distinguished Record of Research Award, the Alicia Wilkerson Smotherman Faculty Award, and induction into the Academy of Distinguished Scholars. In 2012, he established the Jerold A. Edmondson Research Endowment in Linguistics, proceeds of which generate research grants for students at UTA, with a priority given to projects focusing on field linguistics and endangered languages.

Edmondson died in Arlington, Texas, on August 27, 2023, at the age of 81.

== Research ==
Edmondson specialized in researching the Tai–Kadai languages, especially the Kam–Sui and Kra branches. He was one of the researchers who documented the En language during a linguistic field expedition to northern Vietnam in the late 1990s. In 1996, he received a National Science Foundation grant to study the minority languages spoken along the Vietnam and China borders. He tracked down two previously undocumented languages, Xa Pho and Nung Ven, in northern Viet Nam. Edmondson has performed field investigations of many Southeast Asian languages such as various Loloish languages, Bai, Kháng, and Pa-Hng, as well as languages spoken on other continents, such as Triqui and Dinka.

== Selected publications ==
- J.A. Edmondson and J.H. Esling. 2006. “The valves of the throat and their functioning in tone, vocal register and stress: laryngoscopic case studies” Phonology 23(2):157-191.
- W.R. Merrifield and J.A.Edmondson. 1999. "Palantla Chinantec: Phonetic experiments on nasalization, stress, and tone," International journal of American linguistics 65(3): 303-323.
- V.L. Nguyen and J.A. Edmondson. 1998. “Tones and voice quality in modern northern Viemamese: Instrumental case studies,” Mon-Khmer Studies.
- J.A. Edmondson, D.B. Solnit. 1997. Comparative Kadai: the Tai branch. SIL.
- J.A. Edmondson and K.J. Gregerson. 1993. “Western Cham as a register language,” Oceanic Linguistics Special Publication, No. 24, Tonality in Austronesian Languages, pp. 61–74.
- H. Den Besten and J.A. Edmondson. 1983. "The verbal complex in continental West Germanic." On the Formal Syntax of the Westgermania. John Bejamins. pp. 155–216.
