= Qau language =

Kra language spoken in China

Qau
- Native to: China
- Region: Anshun City and Pingba County, Guizhou
- Native speakers: 2,000 (2011)
- Language family: Kra–Dai: Kra; Ge–Chi; Gelao; Qau

Language codes
- ISO 639-3: gqu
- Glottolog: qaua1234
- ELP: Gao Gelao

Qau, Central Gelao, or Sinicized Gelao (Chinese: 汉仡佬; pinyin: Hàn Gēlǎo) is a Gelao language spoken in Guizhou, China.

== Dialects ==
The dialects of Qau that are still spoken are:

- Dagouchang 大狗场 or Pingba Qau (in Pingba County)
- Wanzi 湾子 or Anshun Qau (in Anshun City)

== Phonology ==
=== Consonants ===
		Labial		Alveolar	(Alveolo-) palatal	Velar		Uvular	Glottal
		plain	lat.	Alveolar	(Alveolo-) palatal	plain	lat.	Uvular	Glottal
Nasal		m		n	ɲ̟	ŋ			
Stop	voiceless	p	pˡ	t		k	kˡ	q	(ʔ)
Stop	aspirated	pʰ		tʰ		kʰ		qʰ	
Stop	prenasal	ᵐp	ᵐpˡ	ⁿt		ᵑk	ᵑkˡ		
Affricate	voiceless			ts	tɕ				
Affricate	aspirated			tsʰ	tɕʰ				
Affricate	prenasal			ⁿts	ᶮtɕ				
Fricative	voiceless	f		s	ɕ	x			h
Fricative	voiced	v	vˡ	z	ʑ				
Approximant				l		(w)			

- [ʔ] is heard in syllable-initial position before vowels.
- [w] is heard as an initial consonant of Chinese loanwords.

=== Vowels ===
	Front	Central	Back	
Close	i		(ɯ)	u
Mid	e	ə ə˞	o	
Open		a	ɒ	

Diphthongs
	Front	Central	Back
Close	iu, ie, iɒ, io		ue, ua, uɒ
Mid	ei	əu, əɯ	
Open		ai, au	
Triphthong	iau		uei, uai

Final-nasal
	Front	Central		Back	
Close	in			un	uŋ
Mid	en				
Open		an	aŋ		
Triphthong	ian	uan	uaŋ		

- /i/ is heard as a syllabic [ɹ̩] when after sounds /s, ts/
- [ɯ] is only heard in the diphthong /əɯ/.
- Vowels with a word-final /n/ can also be heard as nasalized [Ṽ].

=== Tones ===
The Wanzi dialect has 6 tones.

Tone	Value	Example	Meaning
˥	55	əɯ55	Water
˦	44	vla44	Eight
˧	33	plei33	Year
˨˦	24	plɐ24	Blood
˩˧	13	mpi13	Goat
˥˩	31	ntau31	Bird

== Pronouns ==
The following are pronouns from Pingba Gelao.

Gloss	Pingba Gelao
I	(su^{33}) i^{42}
you	(su^{33}) mu^{21}
he, she, it	(su^{33}) u^{42}
we	(su^{33}) ta^{33}
you all	(su^{33}) sa^{33}
they	pə^{42} nu^{42}
my household	qa^{33}/a^{33} qei^{42}
your household	qa^{33}/a^{33} mu^{21}
his/her household	qa^{33}/a^{55} qu^{42}

== Numerals ==
Pingba Gelao numerals are given below.

1. si^{33}
2. su^{33}
3. ta^{33}
4. pu^{33}
5. mpu^{33}
6. naŋ^{33}
7. ɕi^{13}
8. zua^{55}
9. sə^{13}
10. pan^{13}
