= En language =

Kra language spoken in Vietnam

En
- Vietnamese: Tiếng Nùng Vẻn
- Native to: Cả Tiểng (Cja Tjeng), Nội Thôn village, Hà Quảng district, Cao Bằng province.
- Region: Việt Nam
- Ethnicity: 236 (2017)
- Native speakers: (200 cited 1998)
- Language family: Kra–Dai: Kra; Yang–Biao; Buyang; En
- Writing system: Unwritten

Language codes
- ISO 639-3: enc
- Glottolog: ennn1243
- ELP: En

En (autonym: aiɲ^{53} or eɲ^{33ʔ}, also known as Nùng Vẻn) is a Kra language spoken in Vietnam. Before its discovery in 1998, En language was undistinguished from Nùng, which is a Central Tai language closely related to Zhuang. In the late 1990s, Vietnamese linguist Hoàng Văn Ma had first recognized that it was not a Tai language, ultimately leading to field work distinguishing En as a separate language. Researchers have determined En to be one of the Buyang languages.

The speakers of En live in northern Vietnam near the border with Jingxi County, Guangxi. In 1998, En speakers were found 12 km to the east of Hà Quảng city in Nội Thôn village, Hà Quảng District, Cao Bằng Province.

== Phone ==
En has 6 tones: / ˥˦, ˨˦˧, ˧˧˨, ˧, ˨˩˨, ˧˨ / (/54, 243, 332, 33, 212, 32/).
