= Hezhang County =

Hezhang County 赫章县
- County
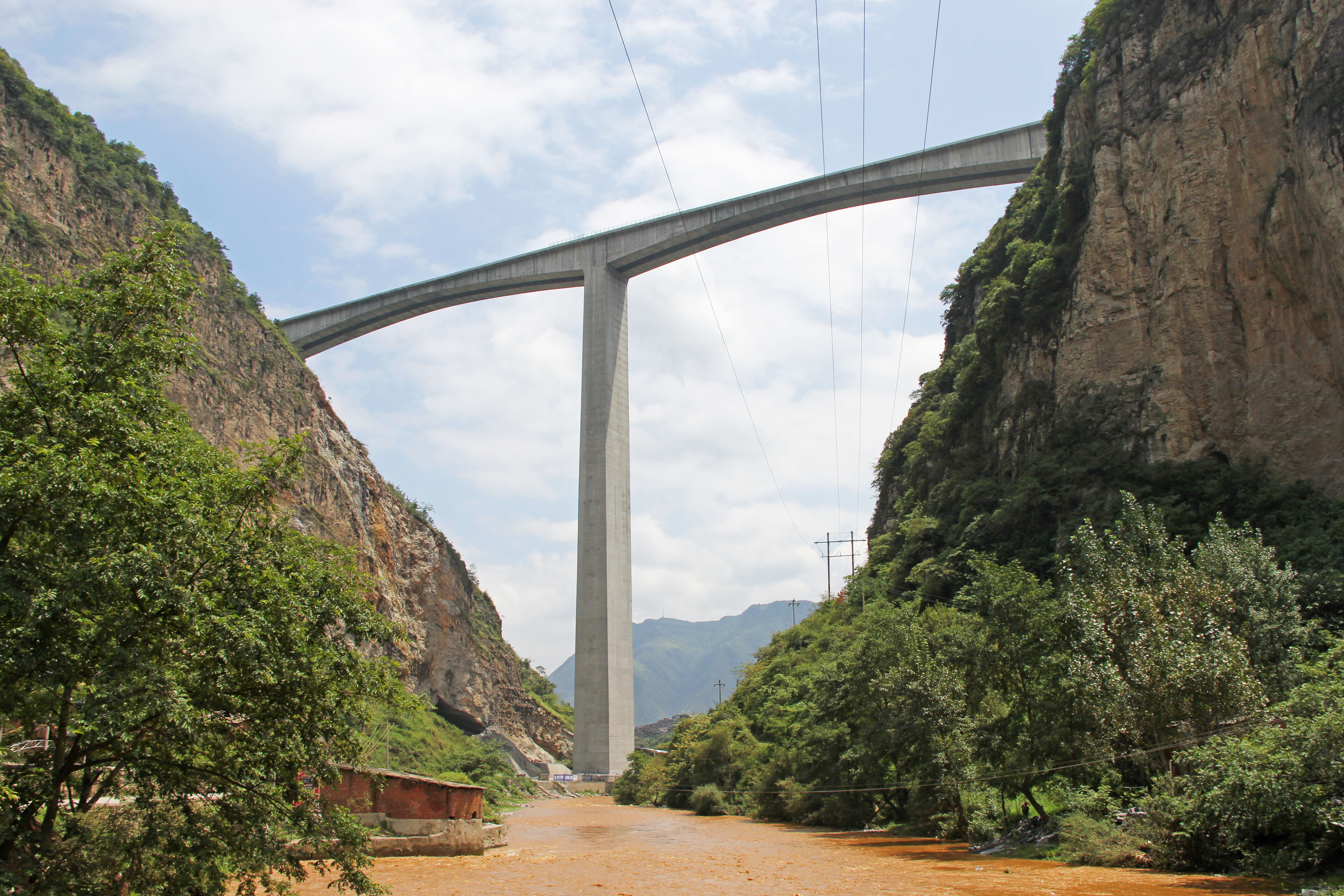

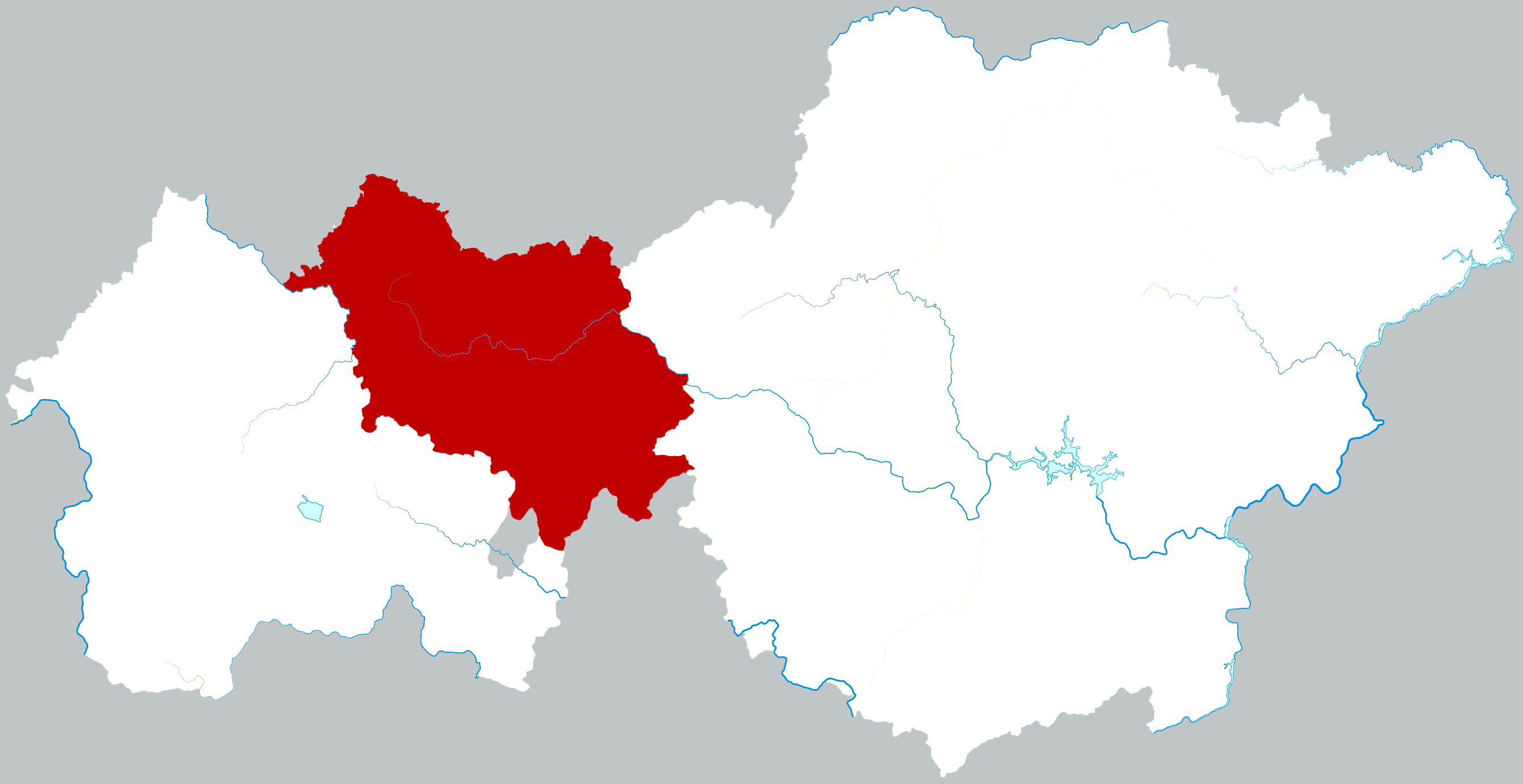
- Hezhang County in Bijie

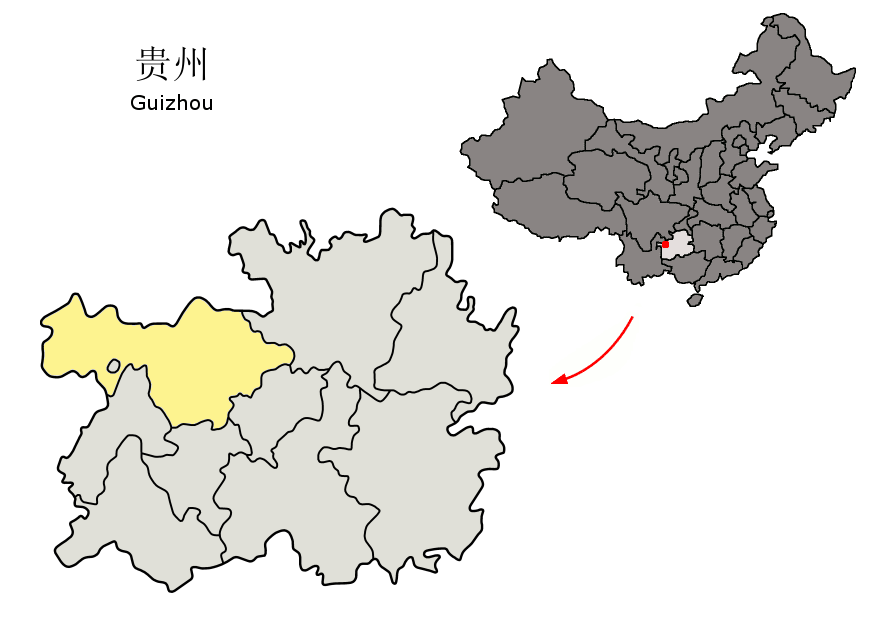
- Bijie in Guizhou
- Coordinates (Hezhang County government): 27°06′47″N 104°42′14″E
- Country: China
- Province: Guizhou
- Prefecture-level city: Bijie
- County seat: Shuanghe

Area
  - Total: 3,242.74 km^{2} (1,252.03 sq mi)

Population (2010)
  - Total: 649,357
  - Density: 200.249/km^{2} (518.644/sq mi)
- Time zone: UTC+8 (China Standard)

Hezhang (Chinese: 赫章; pinyin: Hèzhāng) is a county in the northwest of Guizhou province, China, bordering Yunnan to the north. It is under the administration of the prefecture-level city of Bijie.

== Administrative divisions ==
Hezhang County is divided into 5 subdistricts, 10 towns, 3 townships and 12 ethnic townships:

subdistricts

- Shuanghe Subdistrict 双河街道
- Baiguo Subdistrict 白果街道
- Hanyang Subdistrict 汉阳街道
- Jinyinshan Subdistrict 金银山街道
- Qijiawan Subdistrict 七家湾街道

townships

- Dayi Township 达依乡
- Anlexi Township 安乐溪乡
- Weishe Township 威奢乡

towns

- Magu Town 妈姑镇
- Caishen Town 财神镇
- Liuquhe Town 六曲河镇
- Yemachuan Town 野马川镇
- Dezhuo Town 德卓镇
- Pingshan Town 平山镇
- Zhezhuang Town 哲庄镇
- Guji Town 古基镇
- Zhuming Town 朱明镇
- Luozhou Town 罗州镇

ethnic townships

- Shuitangbao Yi and Miao Ethnic Township 水塘堡彝族苗族乡
- Xingfa Miao, Yi and Hui Ethnic Township 兴发苗族彝族回族乡
- Songlinpo Bai, Yi and Miao Ethnic Township 松林坡白族彝族苗族乡
- Zhijie Yi and Miao Ethnic Township 雉街彝族苗族乡
- Zhushi Yi Ethnic Township 珠市彝族乡
- Shuangping Yi and Miao Ethnic Township 双坪彝族苗族乡
- Tiejiang Miao Ethnic Township 铁匠苗族乡
- Fuchu Yi and Miao Ethnic Township 辅处彝族苗族乡
- Kele Yi and Miao Ethnic Township 可乐彝族苗族乡
- Hezhen Yi and Miao Ethnic Township 河镇彝族苗族乡
- Jiegou Yi and Miao Ethnic Township 结构彝族苗族乡
- Guda Miao and Yi Ethnic Township 古达苗族彝族乡

== Ethnic groups ==
The Hezhang County Gazetteer (2001:105-108) lists the following ethnic groups and their respective locations.

- Bai: 3,856 persons (1995)
  - Qixingmin (七姓民): located in Yongkang (永康) and Shanmuqing (杉木箐), Shuitangbao Township (水塘堡乡)
    - Autonyms/Yi exonyms: Luoju (罗举), Zhuoluoju (卓罗举)
    - Historical names: Boren (僰人) and Baizi (白子)
    - Other names: Qixingmin (七姓民) and Minjia (民家)
    - Surnames: Zhang (张), Li (李), Su (苏), Yang (杨), Zhao (赵), Xu (许), Qian (钱)
    - Locations: ancestors from Sandaohe (三道河), Weining County
  - Nanjingren (南京人) (Yi exonym: Awutu 阿武吐)
- Buyi: 2,939 persons (1995): in Nongchang Village (农场村), Kele Township (可乐乡) (pop. 332)

Ethnic Bai are also found in:

- Sanjiazhai (三家寨), Kele Township (可乐乡)
- Wopi (窝皮寸), Zexiong (则雄), Songlinpo Township (松林坡乡)

== Mining ==
The county has large reserves of coal, iron, lead, zinc, and germanium. Mining had been and remains a major industry; however, inadequate management and regulation of zinc mining has resulted in widespread cadmium poisoning.

== Climate ==
Climate data for Hezhang, elevation 1,630 m (5,350 ft), (1991–2020 normals, extremes 1981–2010)
| Month | Jan | Feb | Mar | Apr | May | Jun | Jul | Aug | Sep | Oct | Nov | Dec | Year |
|---|---|---|---|---|---|---|---|---|---|---|---|---|---|
| Record high °C (°F) | 28.4 (83.1) | 29.7 (85.5) | 34.3 (93.7) | 35.0 (95.0) | 36.4 (97.5) | 37.1 (98.8) | 34.6 (94.3) | 34.4 (93.9) | 35.1 (95.2) | 30.7 (87.3) | 28.0 (82.4) | 25.3 (77.5) | 37.1 (98.8) |
| Mean daily maximum °C (°F) | 8.2 (46.8) | 12.0 (53.6) | 16.6 (61.9) | 21.3 (70.3) | 23.9 (75.0) | 25.2 (77.4) | 27.5 (81.5) | 27.1 (80.8) | 24.1 (75.4) | 18.7 (65.7) | 15.4 (59.7) | 9.7 (49.5) | 19.1 (66.5) |
| Daily mean °C (°F) | 3.9 (39.0) | 6.6 (43.9) | 10.5 (50.9) | 15.1 (59.2) | 18.0 (64.4) | 20.1 (68.2) | 21.9 (71.4) | 21.3 (70.3) | 18.6 (65.5) | 14.2 (57.6) | 10.3 (50.5) | 5.4 (41.7) | 13.8 (56.9) |
| Mean daily minimum °C (°F) | 1.4 (34.5) | 3.4 (38.1) | 6.6 (43.9) | 10.9 (51.6) | 13.9 (57.0) | 16.7 (62.1) | 18.1 (64.6) | 17.5 (63.5) | 15.1 (59.2) | 11.6 (52.9) | 7.3 (45.1) | 2.8 (37.0) | 10.4 (50.8) |
| Record low °C (°F) | −6.5 (20.3) | −5.9 (21.4) | −4.1 (24.6) | −0.7 (30.7) | 3.5 (38.3) | 9.0 (48.2) | 7.8 (46.0) | 8.9 (48.0) | 5.2 (41.4) | 0.8 (33.4) | −2.7 (27.1) | −6.5 (20.3) | −6.5 (20.3) |
| Average precipitation mm (inches) | 9.2 (0.36) | 8.7 (0.34) | 23.7 (0.93) | 44.8 (1.76) | 81.9 (3.22) | 152.8 (6.02) | 167.4 (6.59) | 156.8 (6.17) | 107.6 (4.24) | 59.6 (2.35) | 16.0 (0.63) | 6.8 (0.27) | 835.3 (32.88) |
| Average precipitation days (≥ 0.1 mm) | 9.1 | 9.1 | 11.5 | 13.5 | 16.1 | 18.4 | 17.3 | 16.7 | 14.6 | 16.6 | 8.3 | 10.3 | 161.5 |
| Average snowy days | 4.9 | 3.4 | 0.9 | 0 | 0 | 0 | 0 | 0 | 0 | 0 | 0.4 | 2.5 | 12.1 |
| Average relative humidity (%) | 81 | 77 | 74 | 72 | 73 | 79 | 78 | 79 | 80 | 83 | 80 | 82 | 78 |
| Mean monthly sunshine hours | 57.2 | 80.1 | 112.4 | 134.9 | 131.0 | 103.1 | 153.6 | 152.0 | 116.1 | 76.0 | 89.4 | 64.3 | 1,270.1 |
| Percentage possible sunshine | 17 | 25 | 30 | 35 | 31 | 25 | 36 | 38 | 32 | 22 | 28 | 20 | 28 |
Source: China Meteorological Administration
