= Telue language =

Kra language spoken in China and Vietnam

Telue
- White Gelao
- Duoluo
- Native to: China, Vietnam
- Region: Guizhou, Guangxi, Yunnan, Ha Giang Province
- Native speakers: (1,220 cited 1987)
- Language family: Kra–Dai: Kra; Ge–Chi; Gelao; Telue

Language codes
- ISO 639-3: giw
- Glottolog: whit1267
- ELP: White Gelao

Telue (pinyin transcription: Duoluo 多罗; Tolo) or White Gelao is a Gelao language spoken in China and Vietnam.

== Dialects ==
The primary dialectal areas where Telue (White Gelao) is still spoken are:

- Guizhou, China (in Liuzhi Special District): Judu 居都
- Guangxi, China (in Longlin County): Moji 磨基 (also spoken in Wantao 湾桃)
- Yunnan, China (in Malipo County): Yueliangwan 月亮湾 (also spoken in Fengyan 峰岩 and Laozhai 老寨)
- Vietnam (in Hà Giang Province)

== Phonology ==
Duoluo has many uvular and prenasalized consonants.

=== Consonants ===
| | | Labial | | | Dental/ Alveolar | | (Alveolo-) palatal | Velar | | | Uvular | Glottal |
| | | plain | pal. | lat. | plain | pal. | (Alveolo-) palatal | plain | pal. | lab. | Uvular | Glottal |
|---|---|---|---|---|---|---|---|---|---|---|---|---|
| Stop | voiceless | p | pʲ | pˡ | t | tʲ | | k | kʲ | kʷ | q | ʔ |
| Stop | aspirated | pʰ | pʲʰ | pˡʰ | tʰ | tʲʰ | | kʰ | kʲʰ | kʷʰ | qʰ | |
| Stop | voiced | b | bʲ | bˡ | d | dʲ | | ɡ | | | | |
| Affricate | voiceless | | | | ts | | tɕ | | | | | |
| Affricate | aspirated | | | | tsʰ | | (tɕʰ) | | | | | |
| Affricate | voiced | | | | dz | | dʑ | | | | | |
| Fricative | voiceless | f | | | s | | ɕ | | | | | h |
| Fricative | voiced | v | | | z | | | ɣ | | | | |
| Nasal | voiceless | m̥ | | | n̥ | | ɲ̟̊ | ŋ̊ | | | | |
| Nasal | voiced | m | mʲ | mˡ | n | | ɲ̟ | ŋ | | | | |
| Lateral | fricative | | | | ɬ | | | | | | | |
| Lateral | glide | | | | l | lʲ | | | | | | ˀl |
| Lateral | labial | | | | lʷ | | | | | | | |
| Approximant | | | | | | | j | | | (w) | | ˀj |

- The sound of the affricates /ts, tsʰ, dz/ are frequently close to interdental affricate sounds [tθ, tθʰ, dð].
- The pronunciation of /j/ can sometimes be close to an alveolo-palatal fricative [ʑ], though may not be heard as clearly. This is likewise true for the preglottalized palatal /ˀj/, which may be interpreted as [ˀʑ].
- /ŋ/ can also form a syllabic nasal [ŋ̍].
- Sounds /tɕʰ, w/ mainly appear in modern Chinese loanwords.

=== Vowels ===
| | Front | | Central | Back | |
|---|---|---|---|---|---|
| Close | i | y | | ɯ | u |
| Mid | e | | ə | o | |
| Open | a | | | ɑ | |
| Syllabic | | | ɹ̩ | | |

- /ɹ̩/ only is heard after dental/alveolar fricatives and affricates only, /i/ is never heard in this position.
- /ə/ and /ɯ/ are typically free variants of each other. When used as a single vowel, it is commonly heard as [ɯ], but when followed by a back vowel /ɯ, u/ it is pronounced as [ə].

=== Tones ===
White Gelao of Yueliangwan, Yunnan has 4 tones.

| Tone | Value | Example | Meaning |
|---|---|---|---|
| 1 | 55 | ʔm̩55 | Water |
| 2 | 33 | gɯ33 | wrap, surround |
| 3 | 35 | səŋ35 | Two |
| 4 | 21 | ko21h̃uŋ55 | Door |

 White Gelao of Niupo, Guizhou has 4 tones.[11]

| Value | Example | Meaning |
|---|---|---|
| 55 | mlɯ55 | harvest |
| 33 | pu33liɯ31 | Fish |
| 35 | pla35 | Blood |
| 31 | mlaŋ31 | Oil, grease |
