= Chishui, Dehua County =

Chishui 赤水镇 Ch'ih-shui, Chishui zhen, Chi shui, Chi shui zhen
- Town
- Location in China Chishui (China) Chishui (Asia) Chishui (Earth)
- Coordinates: 25°38′30″N 118°8′14″E
- Country: China
- Province: Fujian
- Prefecture-level city: Quanzhou
- County: Dehua County

Area
  - Total: 90.95 km^{2} (35.12 sq mi)
- Elevation: 970 m (3,180 ft)

Population (2010)
  - Total: 4,063
  - Density: 42.65/km^{2} (110.5/sq mi)

Population gender ratio
  - Male: 2,109
  - Female: 1,954

Population age ratio
  - 0-14: 291
  - 15-64: 2,844
  - 65+: 928
- Postal code: 362500

Chishui (Chinese: 赤水; pinyin: Chìshuǐ) is a mountainous town and one of eleven fourth-order administrative divisions under the jurisdiction of northwest Dehua County, Quanzhou, Fujian, China, located 33 kilometres from the county seat and home to a species of Apanteles (Apanteles opacus).

Chishui has Jiuxian Mountain in its administrative town boundaries. Daiyun Mountain (also known as Yingxue Mountain) is another mountain in Daiyun, a village administered under Chishui. Daiyun Mountain is 1856 metres tall, takes up 35 km^{2}, and is heavily vegetated, protected and trailed. It is known as 'the ridge of Mid-Fujian' and overlooks Alishan mountain ranges in Taiwan. Huangshan pine trees are scattered over the mountain. Chishui also has a ceramics museum and a location on the Taoxian River.

The town has a humid-subtropical climate (Cfb) on the Köppen climate classification.

The town's county had a local bridge and road construction company in Suling Village.

The construction company, the town's economic and social affairs center and the town's agricultural center were cancelled by the county government on February 4, 2021.

The town has 12,038 mu (8.03 km^{2}) of arable land and at least 18 more attractions other than the two mountains mentioned above. As of 2020, it administers Chishui Residential Community and the following fourteen villages:

- Daiyun Village (戴云村)
- Dongli Village (东里村)
- Suban Village (苏坂村)
- Menghu Village (猛虎村)
- Huling Village (湖岭村)
- Lingbian Village (岭边村)
- Fuquan Village (福全村)
- Jiling Village (吉岭村)
- Yongjia Village (永嘉村)
- Suling Village (苏岭村)
- Xiyang Village (西洋村)
- Jinyang Village (锦洋村)
- Xiaoming Village (小铭村)
- Ming'ai Village (铭爱村)
