= A'ou language =

Kra language spoken in China

A'ou
- Native to: China
- Region: Guizhou
- Native speakers: 50 (2011)
- Language family: Kra–Dai: Kra; Ge–Chi; Gelao; A'ou

Language codes
- ISO 639-3: aou
- Glottolog: aoua1234

A'ou (阿欧方言) or Red Gelao (红仡佬语) is an endangered Gelao language spoken by fewer than 100 people in Guizhou, China. Only the Hongfeng (红丰) and Bigong (比贡) dialects are still spoken, each with only a few dozen speakers.

== Dialects ==
The main dialects of A'ou, which all have limited mutual intelligibility, are:

- Hongfeng (红丰)
- Bigong (比贡)
- Qiaoshang (桥上) (extinct)

Only one elderly speaker of the Houzitian (猴子田) dialect was found in 2013, and it is likely now extinct.

Mulao (木佬) is sometimes also included, in addition to Yi (羿), an extinct A'ou variety of Sichuan.

== Phonology ==
=== Consonants ===
		Labial	Alveolar		(Alveolo-) palatal	Velar	Uvular	Glottal
		Labial	plain	retroflex	(Alveolo-) palatal	Velar	Uvular	Glottal
Stop	voiceless	p	t			k	q	ʔ
Stop	aspirated	pʰ	tʰ			kʰ	qʰ	
Stop	voiced	b	d					
Affricate	voiceless		ts		tɕ			
Affricate	aspirated		tsʰ		tɕʰ			
Fricative	voiceless	f	s		ɕ	(x)	χ	h
Fricative	voiced	v	z		ʑ	ɣ	ʁ	
Nasal		m	n			ŋ		
Lateral	median		l	ɭ				(ˀl)
Lateral	fricative		ɬ					
Approximant		w			j			

- Consonant clusters may include /pl, bl, vl, ml/.
- /d/ may have an allophone of [ˀl], heard in free variation.
- Nasal sounds /m, n, ŋ/ may be heard as prenasal sounds [ᵐb, ⁿt, ᵑɡ] when in combination with low tones in initial position.
- /χ/ may also be heard as velar [x] in free variation.

=== Vowels ===
	Front	Central	Back	
Close	i		(ɯ)	u
Mid	ɛ	(ə)	(ɤ)	ɔ
Open		a		
Syllabic		ɹ̩		

- Sounds /ə, ɯ, ɤ/ are only heard when in vowel diphthongs /əu, aɯ, əɯ, ɤu/ or triphthongs /iəɯ, iəu, uəɯ/.
- /ə/ only rarely occurs as a monophthong.
- /ɛ/ may also be heard as [e] in free variation.
