= Hoàng Su Phì, Tuyên Quang =

Hoàng Su Phì Xã Hoàng Su Phì
- Commune
- Hoàng Su Phì commune
- Location within Vietnam
- Coordinates: 22°44′36″N 104°40′48″E
- Country: Vietnam
- Region: Northeast
- Province: Tuyên Quang
- Time zone: UTC+7 (UTC + 7)

Hoàng Su Phì is a commune (xã) of Tuyên Quang Province, Vietnam.

On 16 June 2025, the Standing Committee of the National Assembly promulgated Resolution No. 1684/NQ-UBTVQH15 on the rearrangement of commune-level administrative units of Tuyên Quang Province. Accordingly, the entire natural area and population of Vinh Quang Township and the communes of Bản Luốc, Ngàm Đăng Vài, Tụ Nhân, and Đản Ván are rearranged to form a new commune named Hoàng Su Phì Commune.
