= Bắc Quang district =

Coordinates: 23.333°N 104.750°E

Bắc Quang district Huyện Bắc Quang
- District
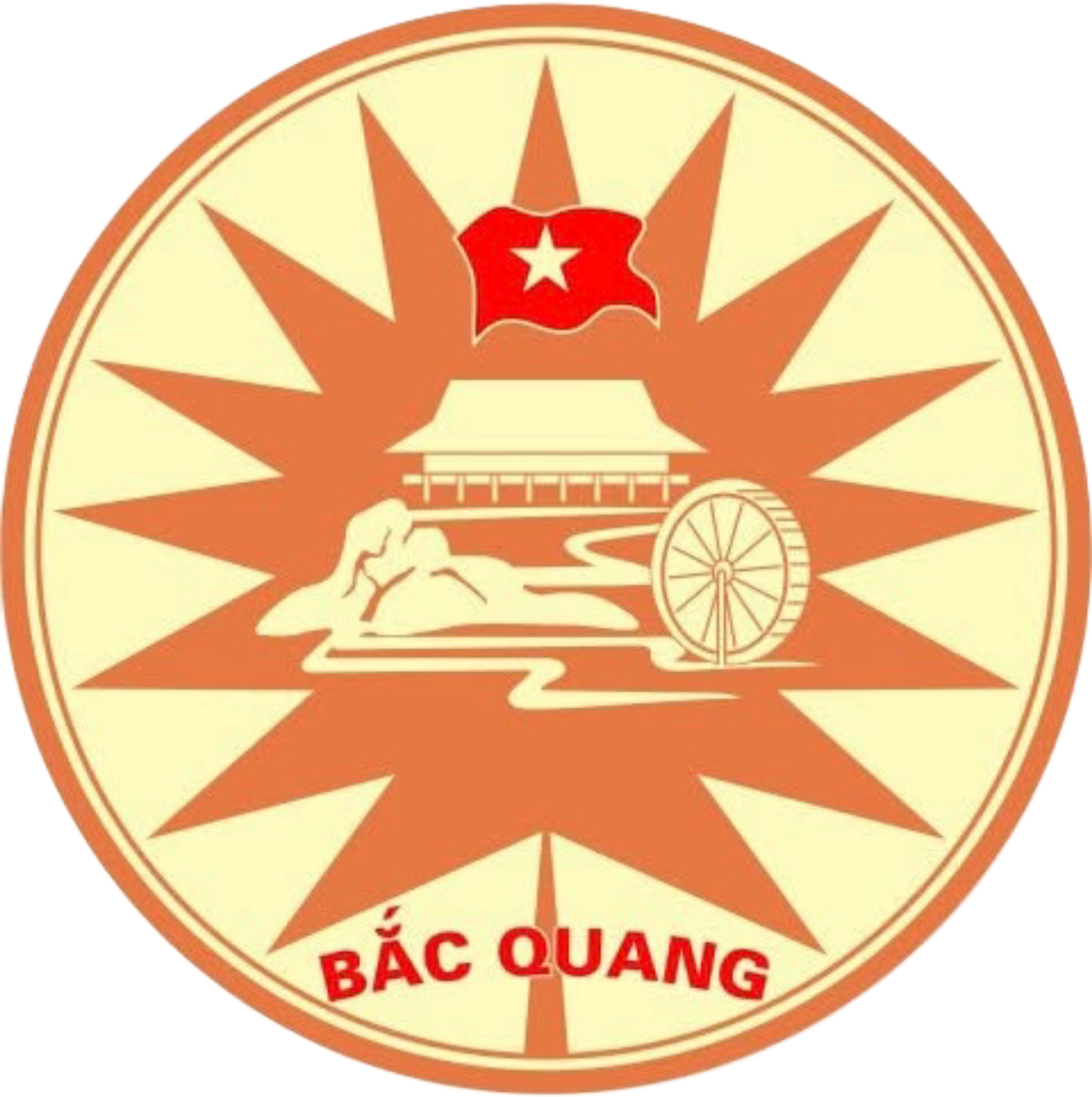
- Seal
- Interactive map of Bắc Quang district
- Country: Vietnam
- Region: Northeast
- Province: Hà Giang
- Capital: Vĩnh Tuy

Area
  - Total: 419 sq mi (1,084 km^{2})

Population (2019)
  - Total: 118 690
- Time zone: UTC+7 (Indochina Time)

Bắc Quang is a former rural district of Hà Giang province in the Northeast region of Vietnam. As of 2019, the district had a population of 118,690. The district covers an area of 1,084 km^{2} (419 sq mi). The district capital lies at Vĩnh Tuy.

== Administrative divisions ==
The district contains two towns, Việt Quang and Vĩnh Tuy, which is also the district capital, and the communes of Quang Minh, Tân Thành, Tân Quang, Tân Lập, Việt Vinh, Hùng An, Đồng Yên, Đông Thành, Vĩnh Phúc, Vĩnh Hảo, Tiên Kiều, Việt Hồng, Kim Ngẩu, Thượng Bình, Vô Điếm, Bằng Hành, Hữu Sản, Liên Hiệp, Đức Xuân, Đồng Tâm and Đồng Tiến.

== Climate ==
Climate data for Bắc Quang
Month	Jan	Feb	Mar	Apr	May	Jun	Jul	Aug	Sep	Oct	Nov	Dec	Year
Record high °C (°F)	31.6 (88.9)	34.2 (93.6)	36.0 (96.8)	38.8 (101.8)	40.4 (104.7)	40.6 (105.1)	38.5 (101.3)	39.4 (102.9)	38.8 (101.8)	35.8 (96.4)	33.9 (93.0)	31.6 (88.9)	40.6 (105.1)
Mean daily maximum °C (°F)	19.5 (67.1)	21.1 (70.0)	24.3 (75.7)	28.4 (83.1)	31.7 (89.1)	32.8 (91.0)	33.0 (91.4)	33.1 (91.6)	32.1 (89.8)	29.2 (84.6)	25.4 (77.7)	21.6 (70.9)	27.7 (81.9)
Daily mean °C (°F)	15.8 (60.4)	17.4 (63.3)	20.4 (68.7)	23.9 (75.0)	26.6 (79.9)	27.8 (82.0)	27.9 (82.2)	27.7 (81.9)	26.5 (79.7)	24.0 (75.2)	20.4 (68.7)	16.9 (62.4)	22.9 (73.2)
Mean daily minimum °C (°F)	13.6 (56.5)	15.2 (59.4)	18.0 (64.4)	21.2 (70.2)	23.3 (73.9)	24.6 (76.3)	24.8 (76.6)	24.6 (76.3)	23.4 (74.1)	21.2 (70.2)	17.6 (63.7)	14.3 (57.7)	20.2 (68.4)
Record low °C (°F)	0.3 (32.5)	4.9 (40.8)	6.0 (42.8)	11.5 (52.7)	16.1 (61.0)	17.6 (63.7)	19.4 (66.9)	20.1 (68.2)	15.0 (59.0)	9.9 (49.8)	6.1 (43.0)	0.9 (33.6)	0.3 (32.5)
Average precipitation mm (inches)	71.4 (2.81)	67.5 (2.66)	91.5 (3.60)	237.9 (9.37)	740.9 (29.17)	957.3 (37.69)	932.1 (36.70)	622.7 (24.52)	425.6 (16.76)	353.4 (13.91)	161.7 (6.37)	78.6 (3.09)	4,740.6 (186.64)
Average rainy days	14.6	14.4	15.6	18.4	21.9	22.6	24.8	22.4	16.7	14.8	12.6	11.4	210.1
Average relative humidity (%)	87.7	87.1	86.0	85.3	83.9	85.1	85.9	85.7	85.2	86.0	86.3	86.0	85.9
Mean monthly sunshine hours	53.6	57.0	57.6	107.0	151.3	136.3	147.6	166.8	157.9	122.8	108.3	78.7	1,344.7
Source: Vietnam Institute for Building Science and Technology
