= Mantsi =

Mantsi may refer to:

- Mantsi language or Mondzi, a Lolo-Burmese (Sino-Tibetan) language of China and northern Vietnam
- Mondzish languages, a group of Lolo–Burmese languages
- Mantsi language (Nigeria), a Chadic language of northern Nigeria
- Mantsinsaari Island of Karelia, Russia
