= Mongphu language =

Lolo-Burmese language of Yunnan, China

Mongphu
- Mongpho
- Native to: China
- Ethnicity: Yi
- Native speakers: ~500 (2015)
- Language family: Sino-Tibetan: Lolo-Burmese; Mondzish; Mongphu

Language codes
- ISO 639-3: None (mis)
- Glottolog: None

Mongphu or Mongpho (autonym: mɔŋ55 pʰɤ21) is a Lolo-Burmese language of Yunnan, China spoken in Lisa 里洒, Guangnan County and in Zhilun 值伦, Upper Zhemei 上者梅, Lower Zhemei 下者梅, and Muyang 木杨 villages of Funing County, Yunnan. There are several hundred speakers. It is likely most closely related to Maza and Mango.
