= Yang Zhuang language =

Tai language of Guangxi, China

Yang Zhuang
- Dejing
- Káang Thó
- Native to: China
- Region: Southwestern Guangxi
- Native speakers: 770,000 in China (2004)
- Language family: Kra–Dai: Tai; Central Tai; Yang Zhuang

Language codes
- ISO 639-3: zyg
- Glottolog: yang1286
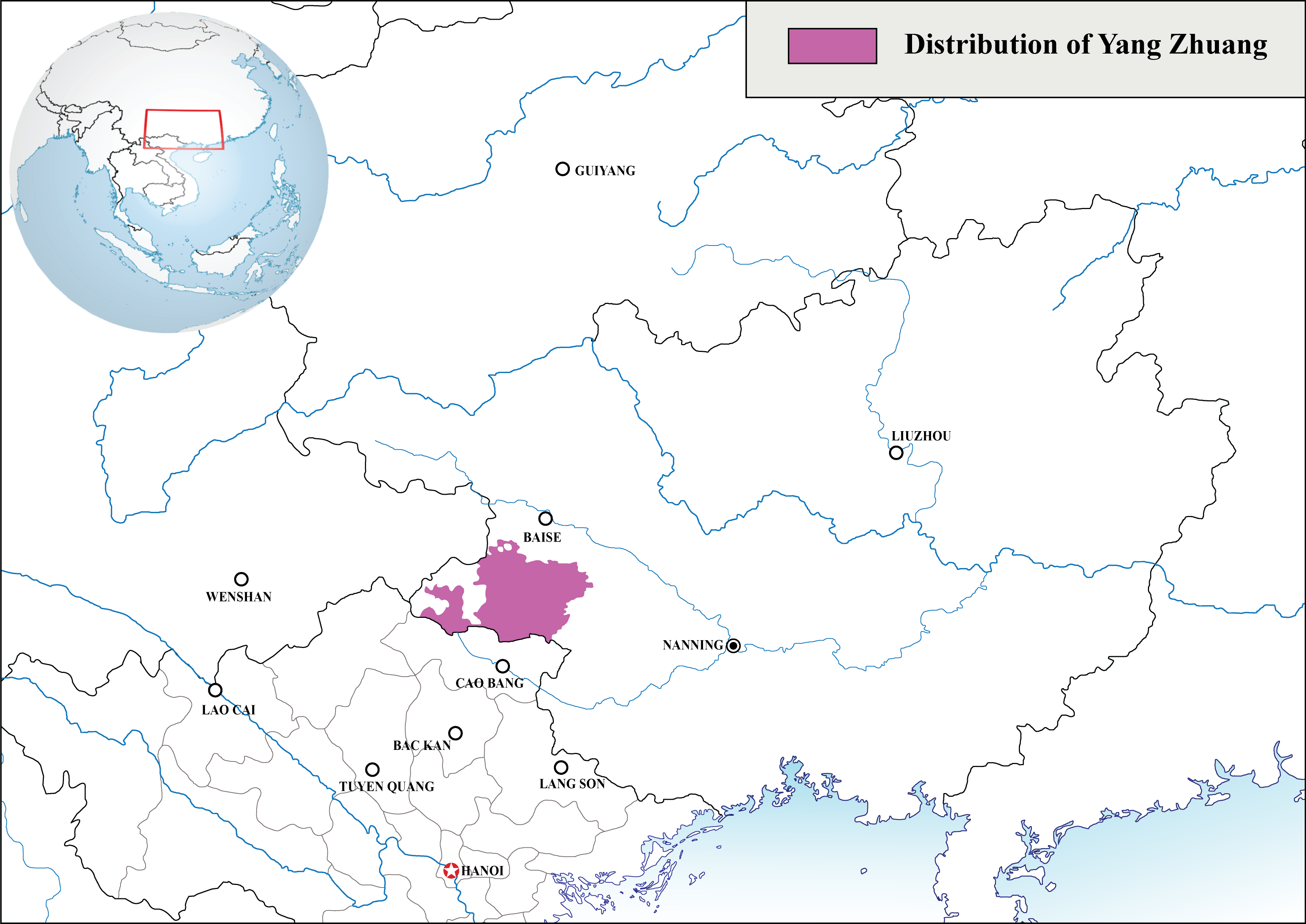
- Geographic distribution of Yang Zhuang.

Yang Zhuang is a Tai language spoken in southwestern Guangxi, China, in Napo, Jingxi and Debao counties.

Li Jinfang (1999) suggests that the Yang Zhuang originally spoke the Buyang language, and later assimilated with other Tai-speaking peoples (See Buyang people#History).

== Distribution ==
Zhuang dialects given in the county almanacs of Jingxi County, Debao County, and Napo County are listed below. This region is also known as the "Dejing" 德靖 area. All names and statistics are from the local county almanacs (县志), as quoted in Jackson et al. (2012). Note that these divisions are often ethnic rather than geographic. Thus, some "Yang" peoples may actually speak non-Yang Zhuang dialects, and vice versa. Jackson (2011) shows that most Yang dialects do indeed form a distinctive subgroup against Fu (also shown to be a distinctive subgroup) and Nong.

Variants with multiple names include:

- Yang 仰 in Jingxi / Nongshun 农顺 in Napo
- Fu 府 in Jingxi / Lang 狼 in Debao / Nongfu 农府 in Napo
- Zuozhou 佐州 in Jingxi / Zhazhou 炸州 in Napo

=== Jingxi County ===
Below are the various Zhuang dialects of Jingxi County. The townships with which the most speakers of the dialect live in are also given. Only "Yang 仰" corresponds to Yang Zhuang.

- Yang 仰: 371,892 speakers; all townships
- Zong 宗: 75,957 speakers; Ande 安德, Nanpo 南坡乡, Sanhe 三合, Guole 果乐乡
- Long'an 隆安 (Nong'an 侬安): 26,102 speakers; Quyang 渠洋镇, Sanhe 三合, Bameng 巴蒙, Dadao 大道, Longlin 龙临镇
- Zuozhou 佐州: 27,011 speakers; Xinxu 新圩, Dadao 大道, Longlin 龙临镇, Ronglao 荣劳, Ludong 禄峒
- Rui/Yei 锐: 11,304 speakers; Kuixiu 魁圩乡, Bameng 巴蒙
- Sheng 省: 14,718 speakers; Kuixiu 魁圩乡, Nanpo 南坡乡
- Fu 府: 1,146 speakers; Bameng 巴蒙, Dadao 大道
- Total: 528,130

=== Debao County ===
Zhuang dialects of Debao County are:

- Lang 狼话： 255,000 speakers in all townships
- Min 敏话： 17,000 speakers in Fuping township 扶平, near Napo County
- Nong Zhuang 侬话
  - Nong Zhuang 侬话 (Southern): 17,000 speakers in Ma'ai township 马隘, Du'an township 都安, and 4 villages in Dongguan township 东关
  - Nong Zhuang 侬话 (Northern - Baise): 34,000 speakers in Dongling township 东凌 and Puxu township 朴圩
  - Nong Zhuang 侬话 (Northern - Tiandong): 17,000 speakers in Longsang township 隆桑
- Total: 340,000

=== Napo County ===
Yang 央 dialects of Napo County are:

- Yangzhou 央州: 41 villages
- Yangdong 央垌: 100 villages
- Yanggai 央改: 3 villages
- Yangwu 央伍 (Yangniao 央鸟): 24 villages
- Yangtai 央台: 22 villages
- Yangwo 央窝
- Yanglong 央龙
- Yangyin 央音
- Yangjie 央介
- Yangnan 央南

Non-Yang dialects and their distributions in Napo County are:

- Min 敏话: all townships
- Dong 峒话
- Nong 农话
  - Nongshun 农顺: Longhe township 龙合
  - Nongfu 农府: Chengxiang township 城厢
- Bunong 布侬: Baidu township 百都, Baisheng township 百省
- Rui/Yei 锐: Longhe township 龙合
- Ao 嗷: Chengxiang township 城厢
- Sheng 省: Pingmeng township 平孟
- Jue 决: Chengxiang township 城厢
- Yong 拥
- Long'an 隆安: Longhe township 龙合, Baidu township 百都, Chengxiang township 城厢
- Zhazhou 炸州: Longhe township 龙合

=== Yunnan ===
Yang Zhuang is also spoken in 6 townships of Funing County, Wenshan Prefecture, Yunnan:

- Banlun
- Bo'ai
- Dongbo
- Guichao
- Xinhua
- Zhesang.

=== Vietnam ===
There are also some Yang Zhuang speakers in Ha Quang district of Cao Bằng province, Vietnam. The number of Yang Zhuang speakers in Vietnam is unknown.

== Orthography ==
=== Initials ===
- p/b - [p] - pay: ไป to go; bá: พา carry
- ph - [pʰ] - phon: ฝน rain
- mb - [ˀb/ɓ] - mbàaw: บ่าว (หนุ่ม) male
- m/mh - [m] - ma: มา to come; mha: หมา dog
- f/v - [f] - fan: เหรียญ cent; vay: ไฟ fire
- t/d - [t] - tóy: ใต้ under; dèy: ที่ a place
- th - [tʰ] - thang: ถึง to arrive
- nd - [ˀd/ɗ] - nday: ดี good
- n/nh - [n] - na: นา field; nha: หนา thick
- l/lh - [l] - laay: ลาย to write, pattern; lhaay: หลาย,มาก many
- r/rh - [ɹ/ɹ̥/ð] - raw: เรา we; rhang: หยัง what
- sl/zl - [ɬ/θ] - slaaw: สาว girl; zloéy: ซื้อ to buy
- c/j - [t͡s/t͡ɕ] - ców: จุ (แตะ) to touch; joèy: ใช่ to be
- s/z - [s/ʑ] - saang: ฉาง granary; zat: แน่น actual, tight
- k/g - [k] - kày: ไก่ chicken; gòw: คู่ pair
- kh - [kʰ] - kha: ขา leg
- ng/ngh - [ŋ] - ngaay: งาย (เที่ยง) noon; nghaay: หงาย turn face up
- x - [ɣ] - xen: คืน night
- w/wh - [w] - waam: ความ (คำ) word; whay: ไหว shake
- u - [ˀw] - ruung ua: สายรุ้ง rainbow
- y/yh - [j] - yà: ย่า grandmother; yhaw: หลีก move within a close distance
- i - [ˀj] - iòw: อยู่ to be at
- h - [h] - há: ห้า five
- - - [ʔ] - aw: เอา to get
- kw/gw - [kw] - kway: ไกล far; gwaat: พลาด blunder
- khw - [kʰw] - khwaan: ขวาน exe
- ngw/nghw - [ŋw] - ngwa: วานนี้ yesterday; nghù nghwèe: ส่าย shake (one's head)
- py/by - [pj] - pya: ปลา fish; byouk: พรุก (พรุ่งนี้) tomorrow
- phy - [pʰj] - phya: ผา,ภูเขา stone hill
- my/mhy - [mj] - mya: เละ broken; mhyán: ปล้ำ arm wrestling
- ky/gy - [kj] - kyá: กล้า seeding; gyaan: คลาน creep
- khy - [kʰj] - khya: หา to look for
- ngy/nghy - [ŋj] - ngyoot: ยอด top; nghyòy: ใหญ่ big

=== Initials for Chinese loanwords ===
- ch - [t͡sʰ/t͡ɕʰ/s/ɕ]
- ty - [ty]
- thy - [tʰj]
- sy - [sj/ɕj]
- cy - [t͡sj/t͡ɕj]
- chy - [t͡sʰj/t͡ɕʰj/sj/ɕj]
- sly - [θj/ɬj]
- ny - [ɲ]
- ly - [lj]
- hy - [hj]
- hw - [ʍ]

=== Rimes ===
- a - [a]
- aay - [aːj]
- aaw - [aːw]
- aam - [aːm]
- aan - [aːn]
- aang - [aːŋ]
- aap - [aːp]
- aat - [aːt]
- aak - [aːk]
- ay - [ɐj]
- aw - [ɐw]
- am - [ɐm]
- an - [ɐn]
- ang - [ɐŋ]
- ap - [ɐp]
- at - [ɐt]
- ak - [ɐk]
- ee - [eː]
- ey - [ej/əj]
- ew - [eːw]
- eem - [eːm]
- een - [eːn]
- eeng - [eːŋ]
- eep - [eːp]
- eet - [eːt]
- eek - [eːk]
- oe - [øː]
- oey - [øːj]
- oem - [øːm]
- oen - [øːn]
- oet - [øːt]
- i - [iː]
- iw - [iːw]
- im - [iːm]
- in - [iːn]
- ing - [iːŋ]
- ip - [iːp]
- it - [iːt]
- ik - [iːk]
- e - [əː]
- em - [əːm]
- en - [əːn]
- eng - [əːŋ]
- ep - [əːp]
- et - [əːt]
- ek - [əːk]
- iep - [əp]
- iet - [ət]
- iek - [ək]
- oi - [yː]
- oim - [yːm]
- oin - [yːn]
- oing - [yːŋ]
- oit - [yːt]
- oik - [yːk]
- o - [oː]
- ooy - [oːj]
- ow - [oːw]
- oom - [oːm]
- oon - [oːn]
- oong - [oːŋ]
- oop - [oːp]
- oot - [oːt]
- ook - [oːk]
- oa/oh - [ɔː]
- oy - [ɔːɥ/ɔːj]
- om - [ɔːm]
- on - [ɔːn]
- ong - [ɔːŋ]
- op - [ɔːp]
- ot - [ɔːt]
- ok - [ɔːk]
- u - [uː]
- uy - [uːj]
- uum - [uːm]
- uun - [uːn]
- uung - [uːŋ]
- uup - [uːp]
- uut - [uːt]
- uuk - [uːk]
- um - [ʊm]
- un - [ʊn]
- up - [ʊp]
- uk - [ʊk]
- oup - [ʊp]
- out - [ʊt]
- ouk - [ʊk]
- ui - [ɯː]

== Sample text ==
The Article 1 of the Universal Declaration of Human Rights in Yang Zhuang:

 Gyook mó geon sleeng ma leer mey slíh-yôwh, qyòw cenh-yêenh wá khoênh-líh mbéeng nhoí raw kor ndáy phyênh-ténh dong lhúm. Geon raw mey lìh-sléng wá lyâangh-slenh, tòoy gyook mó geon ndáy lhúm bèy nóong tò kyan.[9]

== Notes and references ==
- Jackson, Eric M., Emily H.S. Jackson, and Shuh Huey Lau. 2012. "A sociolinguistic survey of the Dejing Zhuang dialect area." SIL International, Electronic Survey Reports 2012–036.
- Johnson, Eric C. 2011a. "The Southern Zhuang Languages of Yunnan Province's Wenshan Prefecture from a Sociolinguistic Perspective." [Working paper]. S.l.: s.n. 49 pages.
- Johnson, Eric C. 2011b. "A Lexical and Phonological Comparison of the Central Taic Languages of Wenshan Prefecture, China: Getting More Out of Language Survey Wordlists Than Just Lexical Similarity Percentages." SIL Electronic Working Papers 2011-005: 170.
- Li Jinfang (1999). Buyang yu yan jiu. Beijing: Central University for Nationalities Press.
