= Buyang =

Buyang may refer to:

- the Buyang people
- the Buyang language
