= Motang language =

Lolo-Burmese language of Yunnan, China

Motang
- Native to: China
- Ethnicity: Yi
- Native speakers: 6 (2015)
- Language family: Sino-Tibetan: Lolo-Burmese; Mondzish; Motang

Language codes
- ISO 639-3: None (mis)
- Glottolog: None

Motang (autonym: mo21 ta21 saŋ51) is a highly endangered Lolo-Burmese language with six speakers in Longtan 龙潭 village, Heizhiguo Township 黑支果乡, Guangnan County, Yunnan, China. It is spoken in only one village. Motang and Mauphu are closely related languages.
