= Paha language =

Kra language spoken in China

Paha
- Region: China
- Native speakers: 600 (2007)
- Language family: Kra–Dai: Kra; Paha

Language codes
- ISO 639-3: yha
- Glottolog: baha1256
- ELP: Baha Buyang

Paha or Baha (autonym: [pāhā]) is a Kra language spoken in northern Guangnan County, Wenshan Prefecture, Yunnan. The two villages are located near the border with Longlin County, Guangxi. Paha is often considered to be part of the Buyang dialect cluster and is the most divergent form. Although listed in Ethnologue as Baha Buyang (ISO 639-3: yha), Weera Ostapirat classifies Paha separately from the other Buyang varieties.

== Demographics ==
Within Guangnan County (广南县), Yunnan, the Paha language is spoken in the two villages of Yangliancun (央连村) (from Zhuang jaaŋ24 lɛŋ31 "lonely Buyang [village]") in Dixu Township (底圩乡) and Anshecun (安舍村) in Bada Township 八达乡. While Yanglian has around 500 Paha speakers, Anshe only has about 100 speakers left. Paha speakers are shifting rapidly to Zhuang and Southwestern Mandarin, particularly in Anshe village. Many Buyang men in Yanglian village are also married to Zhuang women.

== Phonology ==
=== Consonants ===
Paha Buyang has the following consonants.

		Labial			Coronal		Postalveolar		Velar		Uvular		Glottal
		plain	pal.	bilab.	plain	bilab.	plain	bilab.	plain	bilab.	plain	bilab.	Glottal
Nasal	voiceless	m̥			n̥		ɲ̊		ŋ̊				
Nasal	voiced	m	mʲ	mʷ	n		ɲ		ŋ	ŋʷ			
Plosive	plain voiceless	p	pʲ	pʷ	t	tʷ	tɕ	tɕʷ	k	kʷ	q	qʷ	ʔ
Plosive	voiceless aspirated	pʰ	pʲʰ	pʷʰ	tʰ		tɕʰ		kʰ	kʷʰ	qʰ		
Plosive	plain voiced	b	bʲ	bʷ	d				ɡ	ɡʷ			
Plosive	devoiced aspirated	b̥ʱ	b̥ʲʱ		d̥ʱ				ɡ̊ʱ				
Fricative	voiceless	f		ʍ w	θ	θʷ	ɕ	ɕʷ					h
Fricative	voiced			ʍ w	ð	ðʷ			ɣ		ʁ		
Approximant	voiceless			ʍ w			ȷ̊						
Approximant	voiced			ʍ w			j	ɥ					
Laterals	voiceless				l̥								
Laterals	voiced				l								

=== Vowels ===
Paha Buyang has the following vowels.

	Front	Central	Back	
	Front	Central	Unround	Round
High	i		ɯ	u
Hi-Mid	e	ə		o
Lo-Mid	ɛ			ɔ
Low		a		

The three high vowels and the low vowel can be long.

== Grammar ==
Unlike the Buyang dialects of Langjia, Ecun, and Yalang, Paha negatives (such as pi45) precede the verb, whereas the Buyang dialects always place negatives at the end of a sentence. This phenomenon in Paha is probably due to Chinese influence.
