= Manga language (China) =

Lolo-Burmese language of China

Manga
- Native to: China
- Ethnicity: Yi
- Language family: Sino-Tibetan: Lolo-Burmese; Mondzish; Manga

Language codes
- ISO 639-3: None (mis)
- Glottolog: None

Manga (autonym: ma33 ŋa33) is a Lolo-Burmese language spoken by the Yi people of China. It is spoken in Gedang Village 格当村, Xinhua Township 新华乡, Funing County, Yunnan (Lama 2012).
