= Muangphe language =

Lolo-Burmese language of Yunnan, China

Muangphe
- Native to: China
- Ethnicity: Yi
- Native speakers: 300 (2014)
- Language family: Sino-Tibetan: Lolo-Burmese; Mondzish; Muangphe

Language codes
- ISO 639-3: None (mis)
- Glottolog: muan1234

Muangphe (autonym: muaŋ53, muaŋ55 phe21) is a Lolo-Burmese language spoken by about 300 people in Guangnan County, Yunnan, China.

== Distribution ==
Hsiu (2014) lists the following Muangphe villages. Xinfazhai (新发寨) has the most fluent speakers.

- Heizhiguo Township (黑支果乡)
  - Mulang (木浪村)
    - Jilai (吉赖, pop. 137)
    - Xinfazhai (新发寨, pop. 233)
  - Yilang (夷郎村)
    - Mudilang (木底浪, pop. 150)
  - Xinjie (新街村)
    - Mulou (木娄, pop. 139)
    - Mulong (木聋, pop. 115)
- Babao Township (八宝乡)
  - Yangliushu (杨柳树村)
    - Wabiao (瓦标, pop. 119)
    - Muliang (木良, pop. 113)
