= Mantsi language =

Lolo-Burmese language of China and Vietnam

Mantsi
- mã53 tsi53
- Pronunciation: [mã˥˧ tsi˥˧]
- Native to: China, Vietnam
- Ethnicity: 4,800 Lo Lo (2019)
- Native speakers: 1,100 (2002)
- Language family: Sino-Tibetan: Lolo-Burmese; Mondzish; Mantsi
- Dialects: Mantsi (Vietnam and China); Mondzi (Ma21 Ndʑi21, China); Munji (China)
- Writing system: Yi script

Language codes
- ISO 639-3: nty (all dialects)
- Glottolog: mant1265 Mantsi

Mantsi (autonym: mã53 tsi53; also called Lô Lô, Flowery Lolo, White Lolo or Black Lolo, is a Lolo-Burmese language. Speakers are mostly located in Hà Giang Province, Vietnam. In China, speakers are classified as a subgroup of the Yi people. In Vietnam they are called Lô Lô and is classified as one of the official 54 ethnic groups in Vietnam.

== Classification ==
Mantsi may be related to the Kathu (Kasu, Gasu) and Mo'ang (mɯaŋ˥˩) languages of Wenshan Prefecture, Yunnan, China (Edmondson 2003). Lama (2012) concludes that Mantsi (Mondzi) and Maang constitute the most divergent branch of the Lolo-Burmese languages.

== Distribution ==
Monji or Mondzi is reportedly spoken in some villages of Muyang Township, Funing County, Yunnan, China.

Munji is reportedly spoken by the Flowery Yi (Lolo) of Donggan (董干) Town, Malipo County, Yunnan. It is closely related to the Mandzi or Mantsi language of the Flowery Lolo and Black Lolo people of Vietnam and of the White Lolo people of Funing Country. The Red Lolo and Flowery Lolo live across the border in Đồng Văn district, Hà Giang province of Vietnam. Both speak similar languages. The language spoken by the Red Lolo was investigated by Jerold A. Edmondson in the late 1990s.

=== In Vietnam ===
The Lô Lô ethnic group of northern Vietnam consists of 3,134 people in Hà Giang and Cao Bằng, also including some in Mường Khương District of Lào Cai Province. They are also known as Mùn Di, Di, Màn Di, La La, Qua La, Ô Man, and Lu Lộc Màn.

Flowery Lolo

- Hà Giang Province
  - Xín Cái, Mèo Vạc District
  - Lũng Cù, Đồng Văn District

Red Lolo

- Hà Giang Province
  - Mèo Vạc District
  - Yên Minh District

Black Lolo

- Bảo Lạc District, Cao Bằng Province
  - Hồng Tri (including Nà Van village)
  - Đức Hạnh (Bảo Lạc)
  - Nghàm Lồm, Cô Ba Township

== Phonology ==
Phonology of Mondzi:

=== Consonants ===
		Labial	Alveolar		Retroflex	Alveolo- palatal	Velar
Nasal		m	n				(ŋ)
Plosive/ Affricate	prenasalized	ᵐb	ⁿd	ⁿʣ	ⁿdʐ	ⁿʥ	ᵑg
Plosive/ Affricate	voiced	b	d	ʣ	dʐ	ʥ	g
Plosive/ Affricate	voiceless	p	t	ʦ	tʂ	ʨ	k
Plosive/ Affricate	aspirated	pʰ	tʰ	ʦʰ	tʂʰ	ʨʰ	kʰ
Fricative	voiceless	f	s		ʂ	ɕ	x
Fricative	voiced	v	z		ʐ	ʑ	ɣ
Lateral			l				

[ŋ] can appear only as a coda.

Mondzi also has three consonant clusters: [lg], [lk], [lkʰ].

=== Vowels ===
==== Monophthongs ====
		Front		Non-front
		unrounded	rounded	Non-front
Syllabic Consonant	loose			ɿ
Syllabic Consonant	tight			ɿ̠
Close		i		u
Close-mid		e	ø	o
Open-mid		ɛ		ɔ
Open		a		ɑ

==== Diphthongs ====
	a	e	e̠	ɛ	ɛ̠	o	ɔ	u	i	ɑ
i	ia	ie	ie̠	iɛ	iɛ̠	io	iɔ	iu		
y									yi	
u		ue							ui	uɑ
e									ei	

=== Tones ===
IPA	Tone value
˥	55
˦	44
˧	33
˥˧	53
˨˩	21
˩˧	13
