= Mauphu language =

Endangered Lolo-Burmese language

Mauphu
- Native to: China
- Ethnicity: Yi
- Native speakers: 20 (2015)
- Language family: Sino-Tibetan: Lolo-Burmese; Mondzish; Mauphu

Language codes
- ISO 639-3: None (mis)
- Glottolog: None

Mauphu (autonym: mau21 pʰu35) is a highly endangered Lolo-Burmese language spoken by about 20 people in Dagulu 大咕噜 village, Guangnan County, Yunnan, China. It is spoken in only one village. Mauphu and Motang are closely related languages.
