= Bo people (China) =

Ancient extinct people from Southwestern China

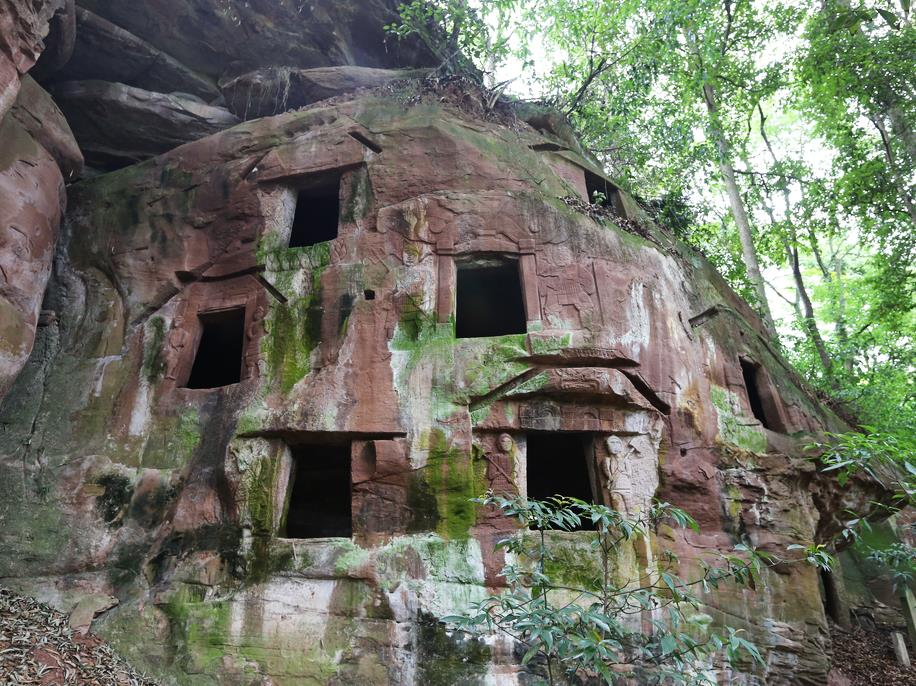
Cave tombs of Bo people at Mount Shicheng (石城山), Yibin, Sichuan.

The Bo people (Chinese: 僰人; pinyin: Bó rén) are an ancient people from the Yunnan and Sichuan provinces of Southwestern China. They are famous for their hanging coffins. They were one of the various now extinct peoples from Southern China known collectively in Chinese records as the Baipu. However DNA analysis in 2025 has confirmed living descendants.

== History ==
The Bo people were native to southeastern Sichuan. By the Zhou dynasty, they were called Pu (濮) (Old Chinese (B-S): *pˤok) and mentioned among allies of Zhou against Shang. The Pu or Hundred Pu (百濮) was a designation of different peoples living in the upper Yangtze river area, similar to the Hundred Yue of south Yangtze. The Hundred Pu was eventually conquered by the Ba state. The Qin dynasty invaded the Ba state in 316 BC and absorbed into its empire.

The Bo fortress of Lingxiao (凌霄城) on Bowangshan Mountain in Xingwen County were the last hold out in China against the Mongol conquest. It fell to the Mongols in 1288, more than 11 years after the end of the Song dynasty. In 1573, Lingxiao and Gong County was besieged by Ming imperial troops, the Bo were either killed or assimilated, and have disappeared from written records since then. Some descendants of the Bo were reportedly found in 2005 in Xingwen County, Sichuan.

== Culture ==
Hanging coffins carved from a single log and bronze drums are widely found in the areas once inhabited by Bo people.

== Possible descendants ==
The Lachi people of Vietnam and China may be descended from the Bo, based on the archaic exonym Labo (喇僰) in Chinese records. The Lachi language belongs to the Kra subgroup of the Kra-Dai language family. Today, the Lachi refer to themselves as qu31 te341, with qu31 meaning 'people' (from Proto-Kra *khra^{C1} 'people').

The Ku of Qiubei County currently speak a Loloish language, and still practice hanging coffin traditions. According to their own records, the Ku people's ancestors had migrated from Yibin, Sichuan province a few centuries ago in order to escape wars.

== Possible languages ==
Languages spoken by the Bo people(s) may have included:

- Macro-Bai languages
  - Caijia language
  - Longjia language
- Kra languages
  - Lachi language
- Loloish languages
  - Ku language
  - Luoji language
- Palaungic languages
  - Puman language (濮满)
  - Blang

Words of Bo origin that still exist in the local dialect (tuhua 土话) of Gong County, Sichuan include máng máng 牤牤 or alternatively niōng niōng ('pig 猪'), and gà gà 尬尬 ('meat 肉').

== See also ==
- Ba (state)
