= GASU =

GASU or Gasu may refer to:

- Garda Air Support Unit, a unit of the Garda Síochána (Irish police)
- Gorno-Altaysk State University, Altai Republic, Russia
- Kathu language, a Lolo-Burmese language also romanized "Gasu"
