= YZG =

YZG or yzg may refer to:

- Salluit Airport, Quebec, Canada, IATA airport code YZG
- E'ma Buyang language, in Yunnan Province, China, ISO 639-3 language code yzg
