= Ku language =

Loloish language cluster of China

Ku
- Bo
- Native to: China
- Ethnicity: Yi
- Language family: Sino-Tibetan: (Tibeto-Burman); Lolo–Burmese; Loloish; Nisoish; Northern Loloish; Nasoid; Ku

Language codes
- ISO 639-3: None (mis)
- Glottolog: None

Ku (autonym: ku55) is a Loloish language cluster of southeastern Yunnan, China.

== Varieties ==
There are three different varieties of Ku. Speakers of each consider themselves to be separate ethnic groups. However, they are officially classified by the Chinese government as ethnic Yi.

- Ku (autonym: ku55) is spoken in Bainitang 白泥塘, Shede Township 舍得彝族乡, Qiubei County, Yunnan Province. They are also locally known as the Bo (Chinese: 僰人; pinyin: Bó rén), and continue to build hanging coffins. The Ku of Bainitang claim that their ancestors had migrated from Yibin, Sichuan.
- Another variety of Ku (autonym: ku55) in Wujiazhai 五家寨, Shede Township 舍得彝族乡, Qiubei County, Yunnan Province is unintelligible with Ku of Bainitang 白泥塘.
- Ku of Shidongmen 石洞门, Xijide Village 西基得村, Zhulin Township 珠琳镇, Guangnan County, Yunnan Province
