= Buyang people =

Buyang
Total population
- 2,000

Regions with significant populations
- Wenshan Prefecture, Yunnan and Napo County, Guangxi in China

Languages
- Buyang, Zhuang, Southwestern Mandarin

The Buyang people are an officially unrecognized Kra ethnic group living in Wenshan Prefecture, Yunnan and Napo County, Guangxi in China. They are closely related to the Laha, Qabiao, Gelao, and Lachi. The Buyang language is spoken, although many Buyang are now shifting to Zhuang and Southwestern Mandarin. In Yunnan, the Buyang are classified by the Chinese government as Zhuang, while they are classified as Yao in Guangxi (Li 2006).

== Names ==
The name Buyang comes from the Zhuang pu˨ jaaŋ˨˦ (alternatively pu˨ ȵaaŋ˨˦), which means "other people." The Buyang of Napo County, Guangxi call themselves the ʔia˧ hrɔŋ˥˧, while Guangnan Buyang call themselves pa˧ ha˧. In Napo and Jingxi counties, many Zhuang are called "Buyang" by other Zhuang groups. In southeastern Guizhou and Tianlin, Longlin, and Xilin counties of Guangxi, many villages also contain the word yang 央, suggesting that those villages may be formerly Buyang-speaking areas that had been assimilated by the Zhuang people.

The Buyang of Guangnan County and Funing County are officially classified as Zhuang, while those in Napo County are classified as Yao. This is because Buyang clothing appears similar to Yao clothing, and many Zhuangs and Hans have mistaken the Buyang as Yao and have called them:

- Tu Yao 土瑶, "native Yao"
- Tie Yao 铁瑶, "Iron Yao"
- Liu Yao 六瑶, "Six Yao"

The Buyang of Napo County are also called the Liu Yao 六瑶 ("Six Yao") because they used to live in six villages (Li & Luo 2010). According to the Napo County Gazetteer (那坡县志), this exonym dates back to the Qing Dynasty, when the "Six Yao" lived in the villages of Nianyi 念益, Guolie 果列, Yancun 燕村, Rongtun 荣屯, Gonghe 共和, and Shanhe 善合.

== Culture ==
Traditional Buyang clothing resembles that of the Gelao and Lachi peoples, although many have now switched to Zhuang-style clothing. Today, most Buyang celebrate Zhuang festivals, although the Guangnan Buyang (or Paha) celebrate the Dragon-Worshiping Festival and the Yin Day, or New Year, Festival.

== History ==
The Buyang people may have originally migrated to their present locations in Yunnan and Guangxi from Guizhou province in the north, which is now occupied by the Gelao people. Various types of historical evidence suggest that the Buyang were much more populous in the past. For instance, many village names in Xilin County, Longlin County, and Napo County begin with Yāng (央 or 秧), suggesting that they may have formerly been Buyang-speaking areas from at least the Qing Dynasty. Today, the dominant languages in these areas are Bouyei and Yang Zhuang. Li (1999) states that the following counties were formerly inhabited by Buyang speakers, but no longer have any:

- Guangxi Province
  - Yishan County
  - Huanjiang County
  - Nandan County
  - Donglan County
  - Pingguo County
  - Nanning County
  - Longlin County
  - Xilin County
  - Napo County
  - Jingxi County
  - Debao County
- Guizhou Province
  - Luodian County
  - Wangmo County
  - Ceheng County
  - Zhenfeng County
  - Anlong County
  - Xingren County
  - Xingyi
- Yunnan Province
  - Qiubei County

The majority resided in the Hongshui River (Hongshui He 红水河) valley. Today, the river serves as a border between northwestern Guangxi and southwestern Guizhou.

A legend among the Buyang of Guangxi recounts that once there were three Buyang brothers living in poverty. One stayed in Guangxi, another went to Yunnan to escape poverty, and yet another migrated to northern Vietnam. The third brother who migrated to Vietnam could have been the ancestor of the En (Nung Ven) or the Qabiao people.

A Qing-era chronicle had also mentioned a people called the Puyang 普央 living in Guangnan (Li & Luo 2010).

According to Holm (2003:15), the Buyang used to build hanging coffins, including hanging coffins on cliffs above a large bend in the Hongshui River near Banwen village 板文村, Sihe Township 四合乡, Donglan County, Guangxi.

The Buyang are reported to have been "banished to 'the edge of the sky and the corner of the sea,' that is, much further south, after a losing a contest of wits with the Bouyei’s apical ancestor Baeu Rodo. Even now, however, when the wind blows at night the villagers still light lamps, because otherwise the returning ghosts of the Buyang will mistake their houses for caves, and fly into them. On such nights women’s clothing is festooned on trees, as a way of keeping the spirits of the Buyang at bay. — quoted from Holm (2003:15)

Holm (2003:159-160) reports that the Buyang continue to exist in the legends of the Zhuang people of Donglan County, Guangxi and the Buyi people of Xingyi, Guizhou.

The Buyang themselves say that their ancestors came from Guangdong and Guangxi. In fact, traces of the Buyang are widespread. In the former Xingyi prefecture in southwestern Guizhou, and in Xilong sub-prefecture in far northwestern Guangxi, there are numerous names of villages and stockades that contain 'yang' as an element. The majority of inhabitants of this area call themselves either Bouyei or Zhuang. According to local legends, however, it was the Buyang who originally opened up the area and constructed the paddy fields. This circumstance is still commemorated each year on the 6th day of the 6th lunar month, when the local Zhuang and Bouyei kill a chicken and present offerings of wine in the fields to the "Buyang rice-fields," commemorating the Buyang and thereby praying for an abundant harvest. — quoted from Holm (2003:159-160)

== See also ==
- Buyang language
- Kra peoples
- Gelao people
- Kra languages
- Yang people
