= Mango language (China) =

Sino-Tibetan language spoken in China

Mango
- ma21 ŋo21
- Pronunciation: [ma˨˩ ŋo˨˩]
- Native to: China
- Ethnicity: Yi
- Native speakers: 50 (2014)
- Language family: Sino-Tibetan: Lolo-Burmese; Mondzish; Mango

Language codes
- ISO 639-3: None (mis)
- Glottolog: mang1429

Mango (autonym: ma21 ŋo21) is a Lolo-Burmese language spoken by just under 50 people in Guangnan County, Yunnan, China.

Mango is spoken in the two villages of Mumei 木美 (Mango: mei55 te33) and Zhelai 者赖 (Mango: ɕi55 te33), both located in Babao Town 八宝镇 (Mango: ba33 wo33).
