= Kathu language =

Lolo-Burmese language

Kathu
- Thou
- Native to: China
- Region: Guangnan County
- Ethnicity: Yi
- Native speakers: 5,000 (2007)
- Language family: Sino-Tibetan: Lolo-Burmese; Mondzish; Kathu
- Dialects: Kathu; Thou

Language codes
- ISO 639-3: ykt
- Glottolog: kath1251
- ELP: Kathu

Kathu (Chinese: 嘎苏话) is a Lolo-Burmese language of Balong (坝聋), Nanping Township (南屏镇), Guangnan County, Yunnan, China. The Kathu are locally known as the White Yi (白彝). Wu Zili (2004) estimates that Kathu has a total of more than 7,000 speakers in Guangnan County (including in Dayashao 大牙少), as well as in Jinping County, Yunnan. Ethnologue mentions a possible presence in Xilin County, Guangxi Province.

A related variety is known as Thou.

Kathu-Thou is notable for having initial consonant clusters, which within the Lolo-Burmese branch are also found in Written Burmese (Old Burmese) and Jinuo (Hsiu 2014:66). Wu (2004) lists the onset clusters pl, pʰl, bl, ml, kl, kʰl, gl, ql, qʰl, ɢl, ŋl.

== Varieties ==
Hsiu (2014:65) identifies two varieties, both spoken in Nanping Township (南屏镇).

- Kathu (autonym: ka33 θu33), spoken in Anwang village 安王村
- Thou (autonym: θou̯53), spoken in Balong village 坝聋村

== Classification ==
Kathu vocabulary is largely similar to those of other Mondzish languages. However, there are various words that do not appear to be of Lolo-Burmese origin, and are derived from an unknown Tibeto-Burman branch (Hsiu 2014). Hsiu (2014) suggests that Kathu could be added to George van Driem's list of Trans-Himalayan "fallen leaves."

Bradley (1997) classified Kathu as a Northern Loloish language, while Bradley (2007) classified it as a Southeastern Loloish language. However, Pelkey (2011:458) notes that Kathu and Mo'ang are not Southeastern Loloish languages.

== See also ==
- Kathu word list (Wiktionary)
