= Lô Lô people =

Ethnic group in Vietnam

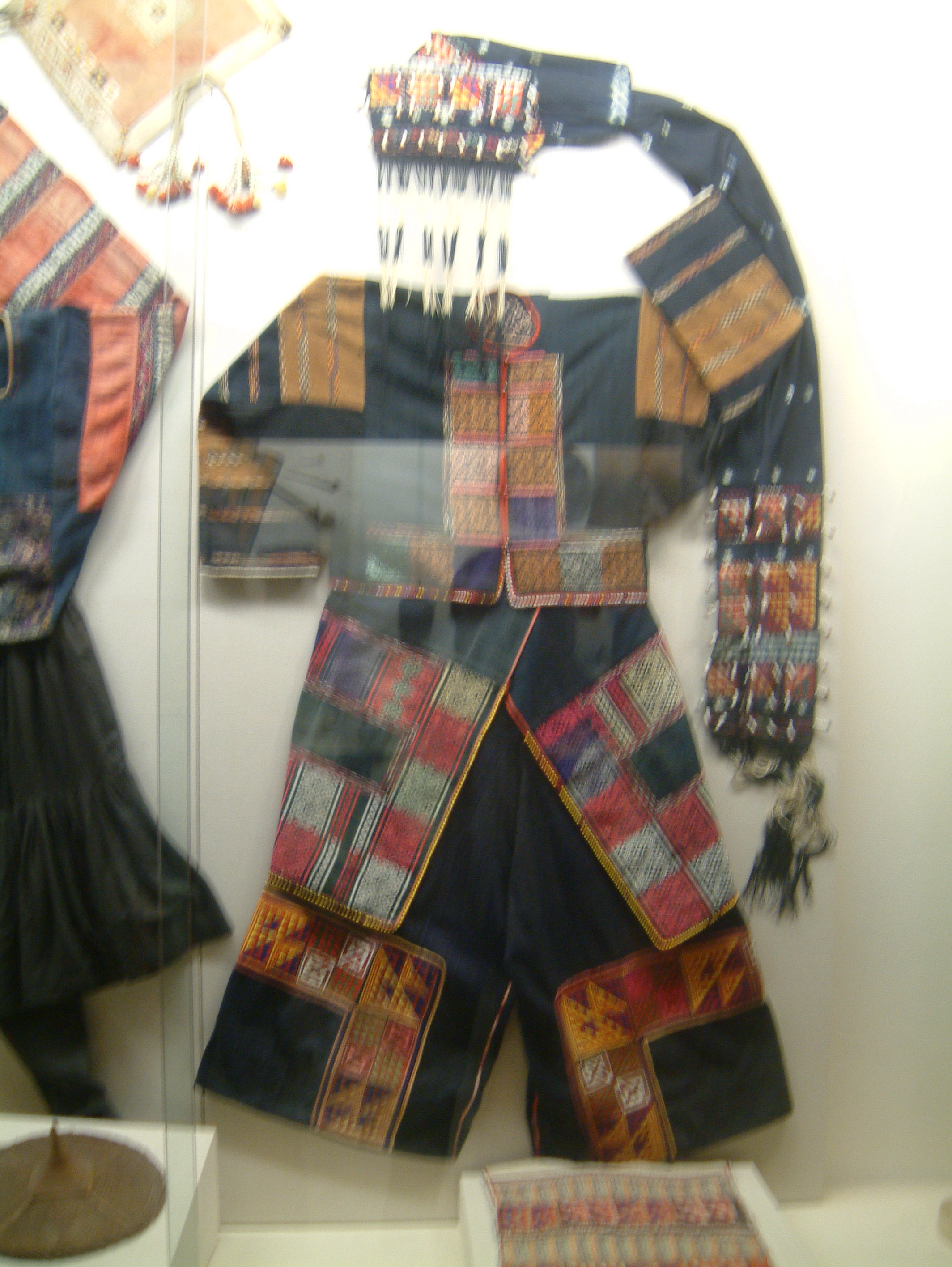
Black Lolo costumes, Vietnam Museum of Ethnology

The Lô Lô is a Loloish ethnic group of Vietnam. The Lô Lô ethnic group consists of 3,134 people in Hà Giang and Cao Bằng, also including some in Mường Khương District of Lào Cai Province. They are also known as Mùn Di, Di, Màn Di, La La, Qua La, Ô Man, and Lu Lộc Màn. In Vietnam, they are officially recognized as one of 54 ethnicities of the country. Speakers of the Mondzi or Mantsi language are classified as the Flowery and Black Lolo people.

== Distribution ==
Most of the Lô Lô settles on the Đồng Văn Plateau of Hà Giang province.

Flowery Lolo

- Hà Giang Province
  - Xín Cái, Mèo Vạc District
  - Lũng Cù, Đồng Văn District

Red Lolo

- Hà Giang Province
  - Mèo Vạc District
  - Yên Minh District

Black Lolo The Black Lolo live in Bảo Lạc District, Cao Bằng Province, just to the east of Hà Giang Province. Black Lolo (Ma Ndzi) of Cao Bằng is covered in Iwasa (2003).

- Bảo Lạc District, Cao Bằng Province
  - Hồng Tri (including Nà Van village)
  - Đức Hạnh (Bảo Lạc)
  - Nghàm Lồm, Cô Ba Township

=== Quoc (2011) ===
Quoc (2011) lists the following ethnic Lolo villages in northern Vietnam.

- Meo Vac District, Ha Giang
  - Thượng Phùng township
    - bản Mỏ Phàng
    - bản Hoa Cà
  - Xin Cái township
    - Cờ Tẳng
    - Cờ Lẳng
    - Mè Lẳng
  - bản Sắng Pả A/B, Mèo Vạc
- Dong Van District, Ha Giang
  - bản Lô Lô Chải, Lũng Cú township
  - bản Mã Là, Lũng Táo township
  - khu Đoàn Kết, Sủng Là township
- Bao Lac District, Cao Bang
  - Hồng Trị township
    - Cốc Xả Trên/Dươi
    - Khau Cà
    - Khau Trang
    - Nà Van
    - Khuổi Khon
    - Khuổi Pao
  - bản Ngàm Lầm, Cô Ba township
- Bao Lam District, Cao Bang
  - Đức Hạnh township
