= Maza language =

Lolo-Burmese language of China

Maza
- Native to: China
- Ethnicity: Yi
- Native speakers: 50 (2014)
- Language family: Sino-Tibetan: Lolo-Burmese; Mondzish; Maza

Language codes
- ISO 639-3: None (mis)
- Glottolog: maza1306

Maza (autonym: ma33 zɑ53) is a Lolo-Burmese language spoken by the Yi people of China.

Maza is spoken by about 50 people in the village of Mengmei 孟梅 (Maza: qʰa33 le55), Puyang Village 普阳村, Muyang Township 木央乡, Funing County, Yunnan. Maza has a Qabiao substratum, since the area was originally inhabited by Qabiao speakers (Hsiu 2014:68-69). Maza displays circumfixal negation, a syntactic feature that is usually typical of Kra languages.
