= Hanging coffins =

Burial method

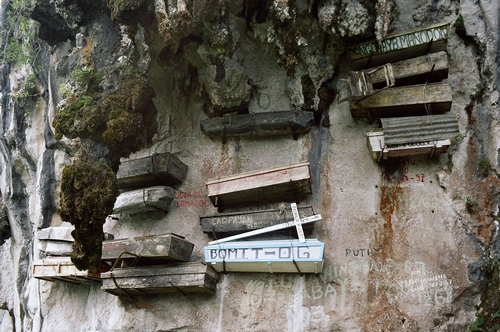
Hanging coffins at Sagada, Mountain Province in the Philippines.

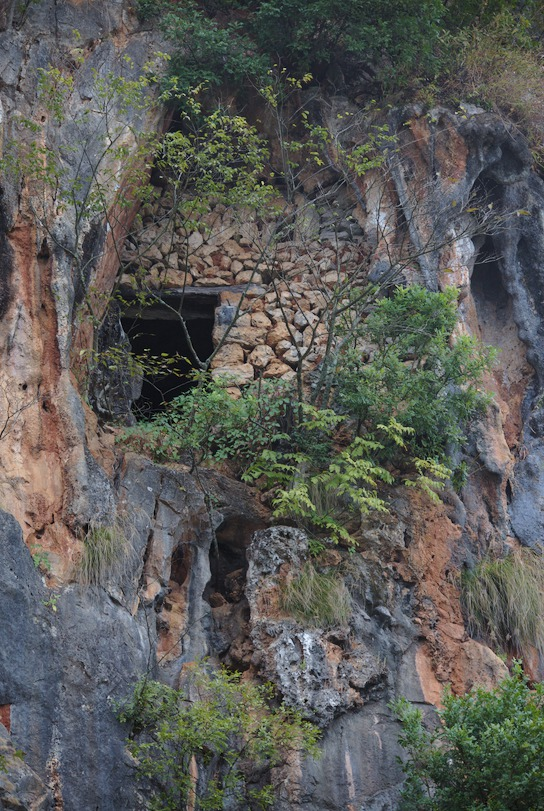
One of the hanging tombs of the Ku People at Bainitang (白泥塘), Qiubei county, Wenshan prefecture, Yunnan province, China.

Hanging coffins are coffins which have been placed on cliffs. They are practiced by various cultures in China, Indonesia, and the Philippines.

== China ==
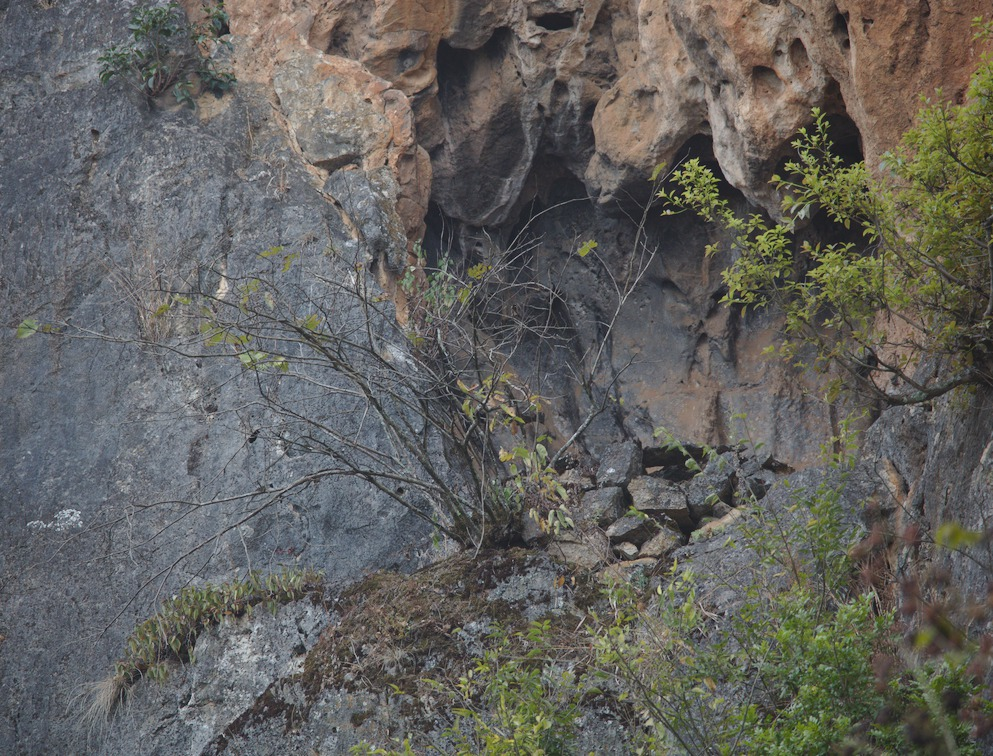
One of the hanging tombs (example of an exposed natural site) of the Ku People at Bainitang (白泥塘), Qiubei county, Wenshan prefecture, Yunnan province, China.

Hanging coffins in China are known in Mandarin as xuanguan (simplified Chinese: 悬棺; traditional Chinese: 懸棺; pinyin: xuán guān) which also means "hanging coffin". They are an ancient funeral custom of some ethnic minorities. The most famous hanging coffins are those which were made by the Bo people (now extinct) of Sichuan and Yunnan. Coffins of various shapes were mostly carved from one whole piece of wood. Hanging coffins either lie on beams projecting outward from vertical faces such as mountains, are placed in caves in the face of cliffs, or sit on natural rock projections on mountain faces.

The Bo people were one of the non-Han peoples native to southern China prior to Qin-Han conquests southward. The sparse descriptions of them in Chinese records describe them as being a prosperous farming culture who were also accomplished horsemen. They became victims of genocide by the Ming Dynasty in 1573 AD and are effectively extinct. Their language, rituals, and behaviors are unknown to archaeologists. There is a possibility, however, that the Ku people of Qiubei in southern Yunnan are surviving descendants of the Bo. Some of the Ku people also practice hanging coffins. People with the surname "He" in Yunnan are also believed locally to be descendants of the Bo.

The reasons for the hanging coffins of the Bo people are unknown, because no Bo people are left. But it may simply be to prevent the dead from being disturbed. This is implied by Marco Polo's brief observation of the Bo rituals, saying that "when deceased [they] had their bodies put in a box and taken to the mountains to be put in caves, or hung out where others can not reach."

Aside from the hanging coffins of the Bo, there are also several other hanging coffin sites found throughout China from differing time periods. They are also similarly mysterious, with the peoples responsible for them now either extinct or Sinicized. The following is a list of hanging coffin sites in China:

- Fujian
  - Wuyi Mountains
- Hubei
  - Zigui County
- Jiangxi
  - Longhushan (龍虎山), 20 km southwest of Yingtan City (Guyue people)
- Sichuan
  - Gongxian County of Yibin, southwest Sichuan (Bo people)
  - Qutang Gorge, one of the Three Gorges
- Guangxi
  - Hongshui River cliffs of Donglan County, with hanging coffins built by the Buyang people
- Yunnan
  - Hanging tombs of the Bo people at Doushaguan (豆沙关僰人悬棺)
  - Cliffs southeast of Bainitang (白泥塘), Qiubei County, Wenshan Prefecture (Ku people, descendants of the Bo of Sichuan)

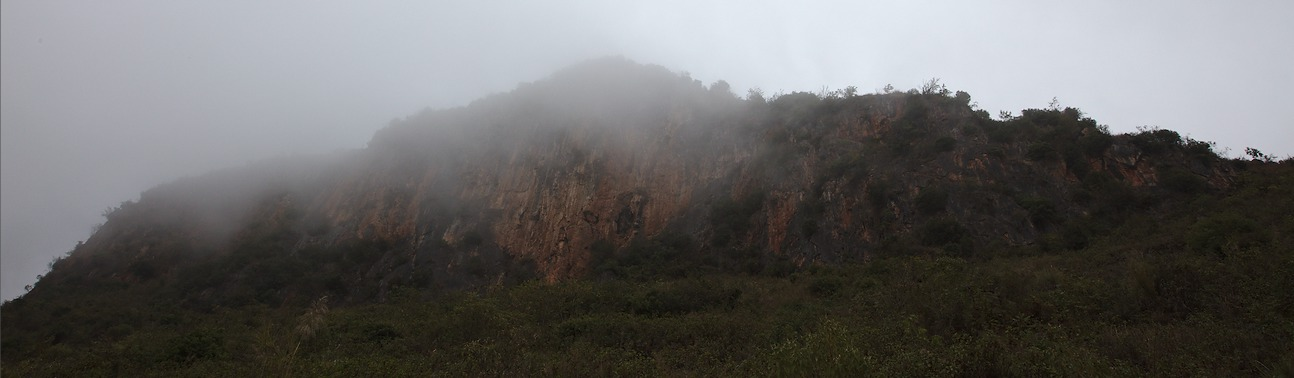
General view of the cliff face at Bainitang (白泥塘), site of the hanging tombs of the Ku people in Qiubei County, Wenshan prefecture, Yunnan province, China.

== Philippines ==
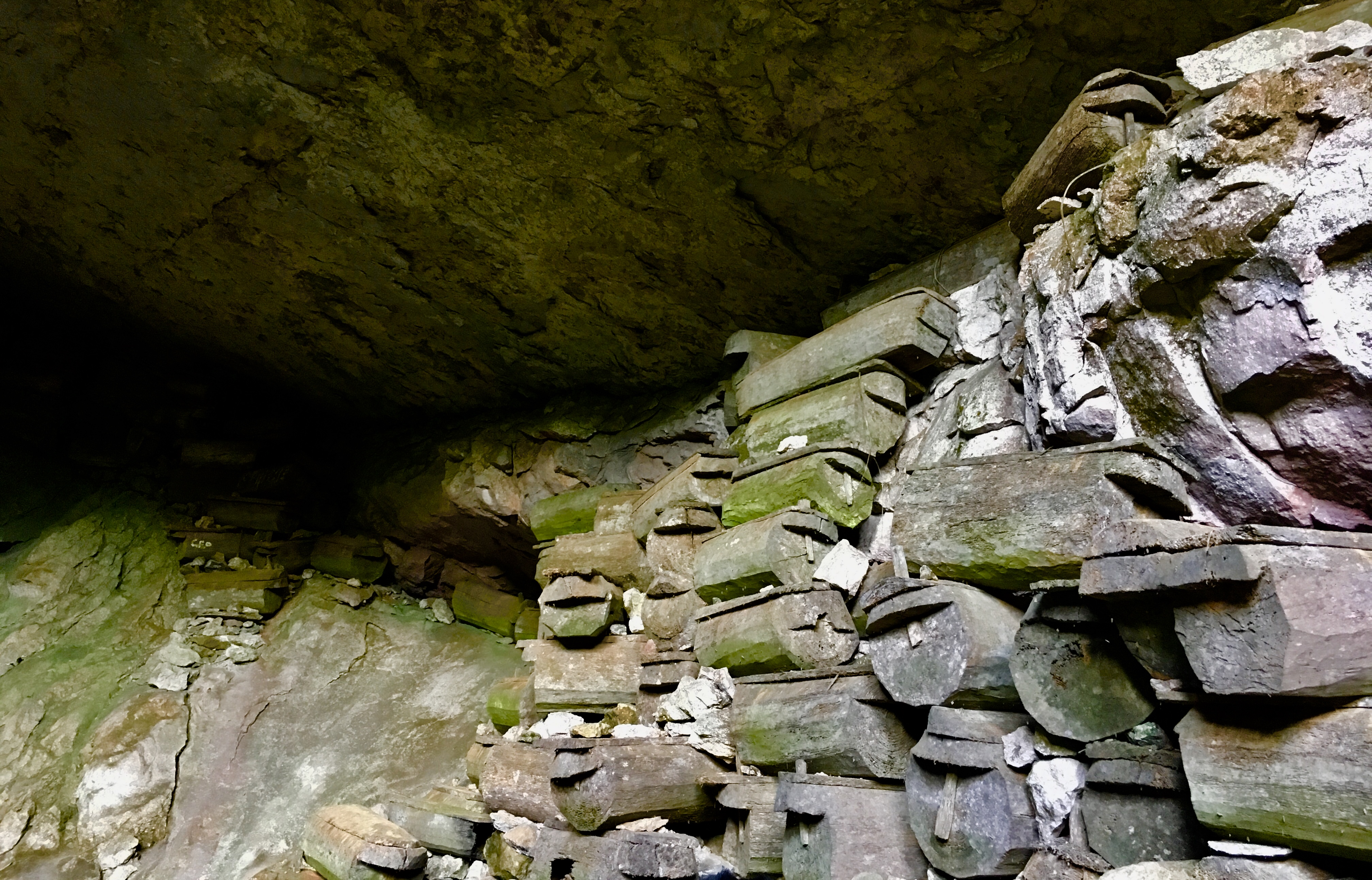
Coffins stacked inside the Lumiang Cave in Sagada, Mountain Province, Philippines

Hanging coffins are one of the funerary practices among the Kankanaey people of Sagada, Mountain Province, in the island Luzon of the Philippines. They have not been studied by archaeologists, so the exact age of the coffins is unknown, though they are believed to be centuries old. The coffins are placed underneath natural overhangs, either on natural rock shelves/crevices or on projecting beams slotted into holes dug into the cliff-side. The coffins are small because the bodies inside the coffins are in a fetal position. This is due to the belief that people should leave the world in the same position as they entered it, a tradition common throughout the various pre-colonial cultures of the Philippines. The coffins are usually carved by their eventual occupants during their lifetimes.

Despite their popularity, hanging coffins are not the main funerary practice of the Kankanaey. It is reserved only for distinguished or honorable leaders of the community. They must have performed acts of merit, made wise decisions, and led traditional rituals during their lifetimes. The height at which their coffins are placed reflects their social status. Most people interred in hanging coffins are the most prominent members of the amam-a, the council of male elders in the traditional dap-ay (the communal men's dormitory and civic center of the village). There is also one documented case of a woman being accorded the honor of a hanging coffin interment.

The more common burial custom of the Kankanaey is for coffins to be tucked into crevices or stacked on top of each other inside limestone caves. Like in hanging coffins, the location depends on the status of the deceased as well as the cause of death. All of these burial customs require specific pre-interment rituals known as the sangadil. The Kankanaey believe that interring the dead in caves or cliffs ensures that their spirits (anito) can roam around and continue to protect the living.

The hanging coffins in Echo Valley have become tourist attractions.

== Indonesia ==
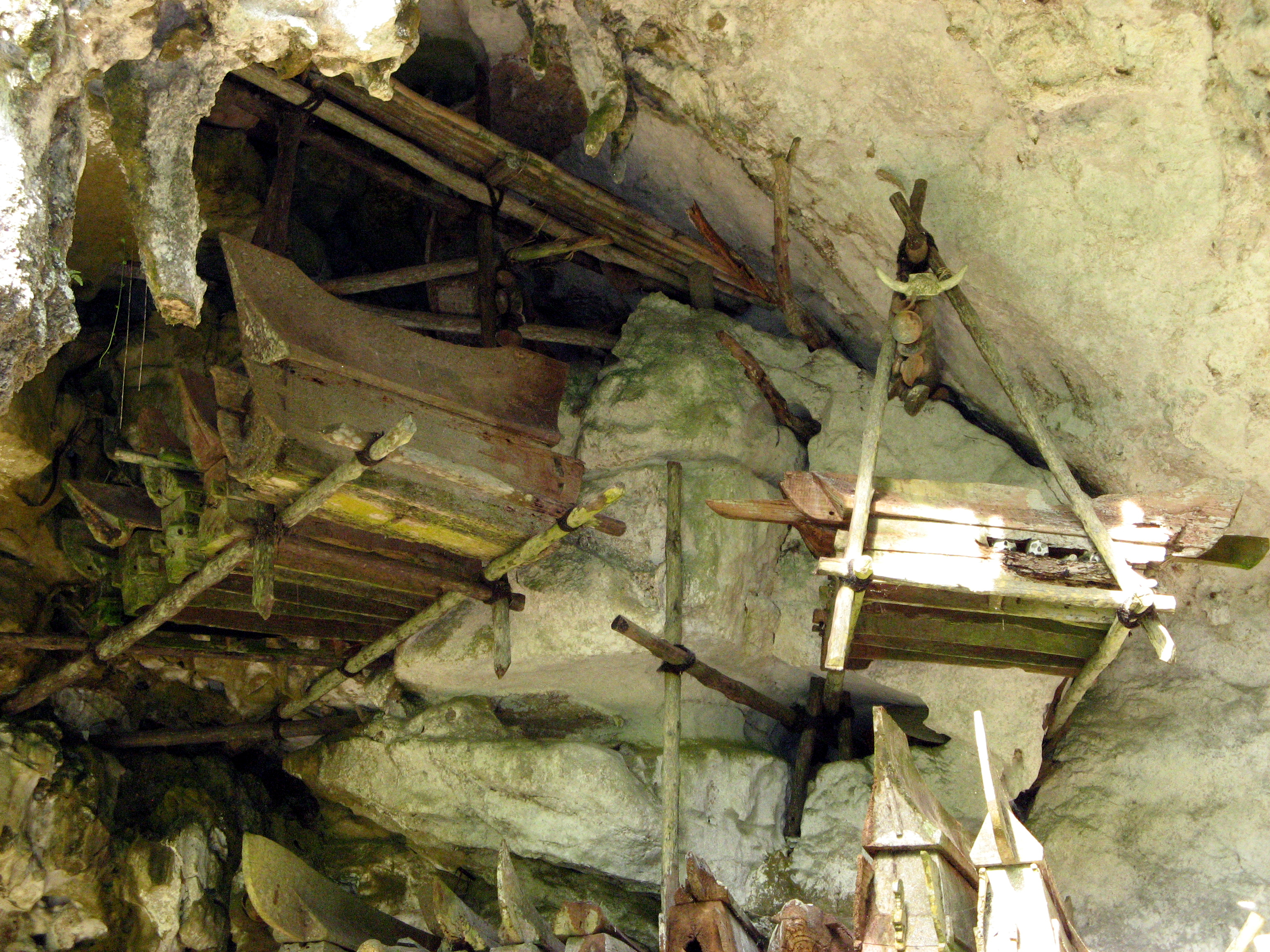
Liang tokek of the Toraja people at the Londa Nanggala Cave in Sulawesi

Hanging coffins (liang tokek, literally "hanging burial") is one of the funerary practices of the Toraja people of Sulawesi, either for primary or secondary burials. The distinctively boat-shaped coffins, known as erong, are always placed below overhanging parts of the cliff-face. These can be natural overhangs or cave openings, but some coffins are placed beneath man-made overhangs. They are guarded by carved wooden representations of the dead known as tau-tau. Older tau-tau are more abstract, but more modern tau-tau can be quite lifelike. The reasoning for their placement is to discourage looters who might steal the items interred with the dead.

Like the hanging coffins of the Philippines, liang tokek accounts for only a minority of the region's funerary practices. Liang tokek were reserved for the "founders" of the village and thus are among the oldest dated coffins, dating to around 780 AD. They were part of burial complexes which include other kinds of interment practices, usually differing based on the social class and age of the dead. These complexes are believed by the Torajans to be abodes of spirits of the dead in the afterlife.

The more common types of ancient burial were the liang sillik and liang erong which were cave burials; with the latter utilizing coffins (erong), while the former does not. Other more recent burial customs include liang pak (tombs carved into walls), tangdan (house-shaped tombs for noblemen, usually placed on hilltops), and liang patane (house-shaped tombs for commoners).

== See also ==
- Jar burial
