= Gouding =

Monarchical state from 111 BCE to 316 AD

Gouding (Chinese: 句町) was a monarchical state that lasted approximately 400 years, from 111 BC to 316 AD, and was centered on Guangnan County in modern-day Wenshan Zhuang and Miao Autonomous Prefecture, Yunnan province, China.

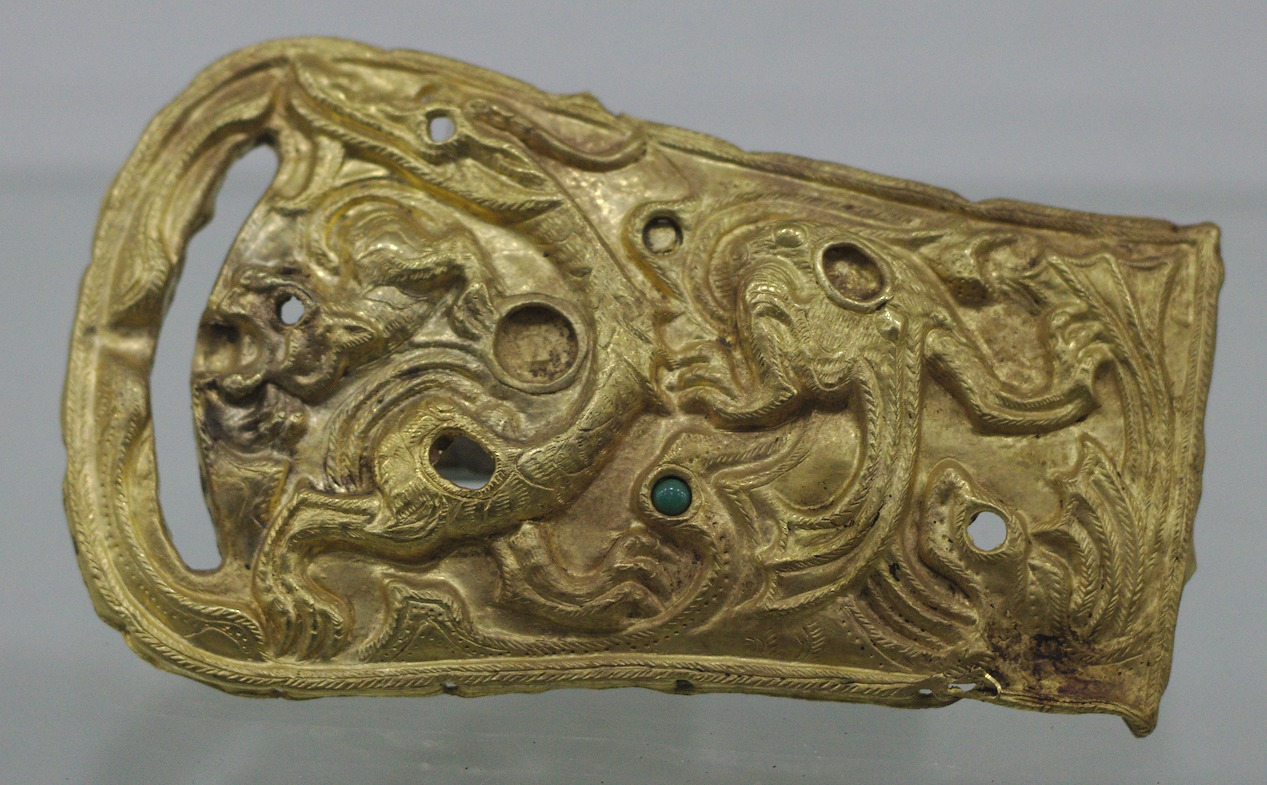
A golden belt buckle from the historic Gouding Kingdom featuring dragons and inlay of precious stones. Object #88, unearthed from tomb M4. As displayed at Guangnan Minorities Museum, 2015-12-01.

In December 2015, artifacts unearthed from Gouding were on display at the Guangnan Minorities Museum.

== See also ==
- Yelang
- Đông Sơn drums
- Southward expansion of the Han dynasty
- Zomia (geography)
