= Mondzish languages =

Group of Lolo–Burmese languages

Mondzish
- Geographic distribution: Chinese–Vietnamese border
- Linguistic classification: Sino-Tibetan: Lolo–Burmese; Mondzish
- Subdivisions: Kathu; Nuclear Mondzish

Language codes
- Glottolog: mond1269

Wenshan prefecture in Yunnan, China

Mondzish (Mangish) is a small group of languages that constitute the most divergent branch of the Lolo–Burmese languages in the classification of Lama (2012). The Mondzish languages are spoken in Funing, Guangnan, Malipo, and Napo counties of China and Hà Giang and Cao Bang provinces of northern Vietnam. The autonyms of Mondzish-speaking peoples often begins with *man-. Lama (2012) considers *man- to be cognate with Mán (蛮), which is an ancient Chinese exonym for non-Chinese peoples to the south.

Mondzish languages are spoken in Wenshan Prefecture, Yunnan, China and across the border in Hà Giang Province, Vietnam. According to Hsiu (2014), Kathu is related.

== Classification ==
Hsiu (2014:73) classifies the Mondzish languages as follows. Additional languages from Hsiu (2017) are also included.

- Kathu (Thou)
- Nuclear Mondzish (Nuclear Mangish)
  - Muangphe
  - Mango, Manga
  - Maang (also known as Mo'ang, Meang)
  - Mondzi or Mantsi (also known as Lô Lô by the Vietnamese)
  - Maza
  - Mauphu, Motang
  - Mongphu

A revised classification of Mondzish languages by Hsiu (2018) is as follows.

- Mondzish
  - Northwestern Mondzish: Kathu, Thou
  - Core (Nuclear) Mondzish
    - Southern Mondzish: Mondzi / Mantsi cluster
    - Southeastern Mondzish: Meang / Maang cluster
    - Eastern Mondzish
      - Mango / Manga cluster
      - Mongphu
      - Maza
    - Central Mondzish
      - Muangphe
      - Mauphu, Motang

== Sound changes ==
Lama (2012) lists the following sound changes from Proto-Loloish as Mondzish innovations.

- *tsʰ- > s-
- *ɣr- > ʐ-
- *ɣʷ- > b-
