= Xingwen County =

Xingwen County 兴文县
- County
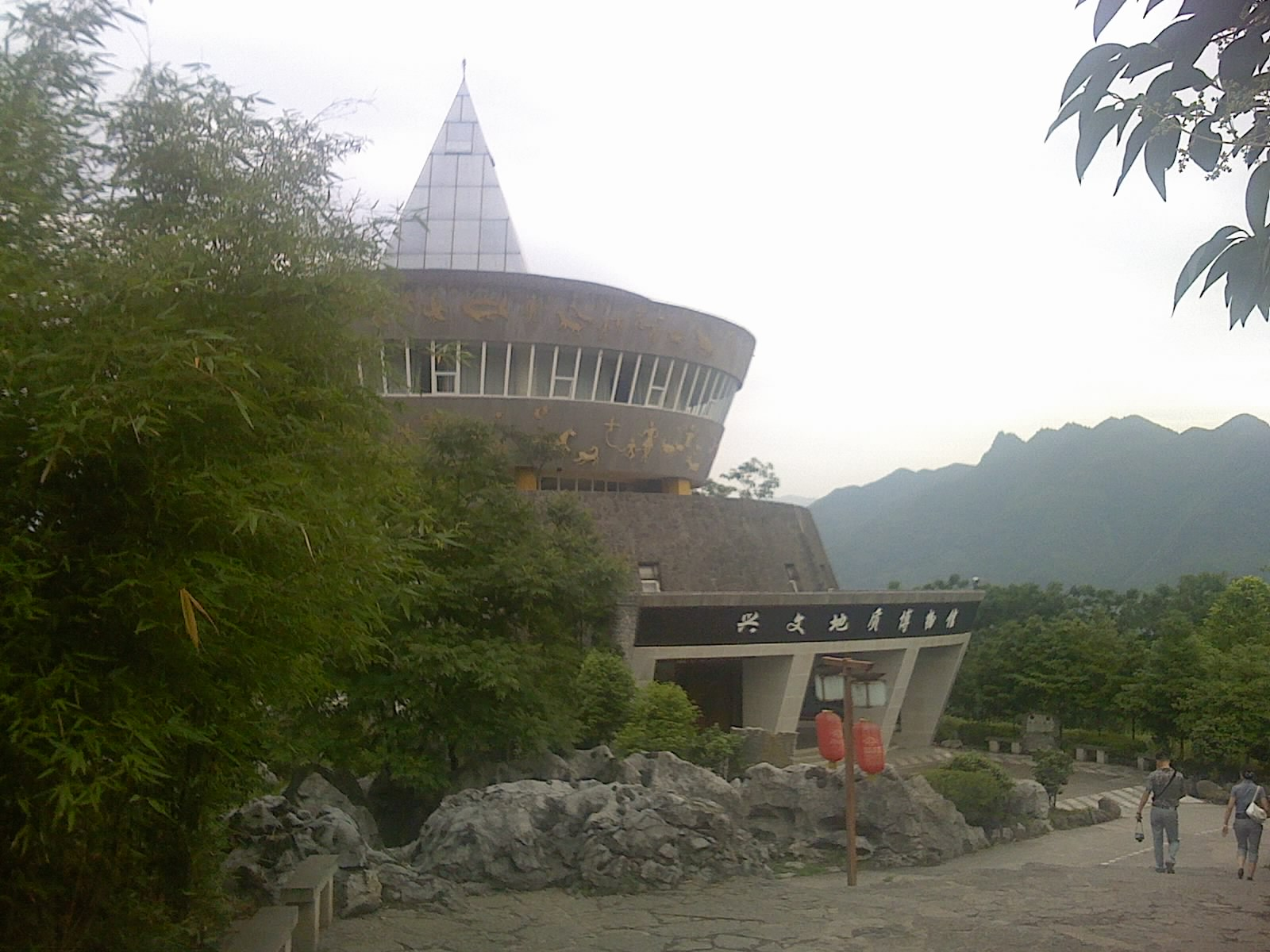

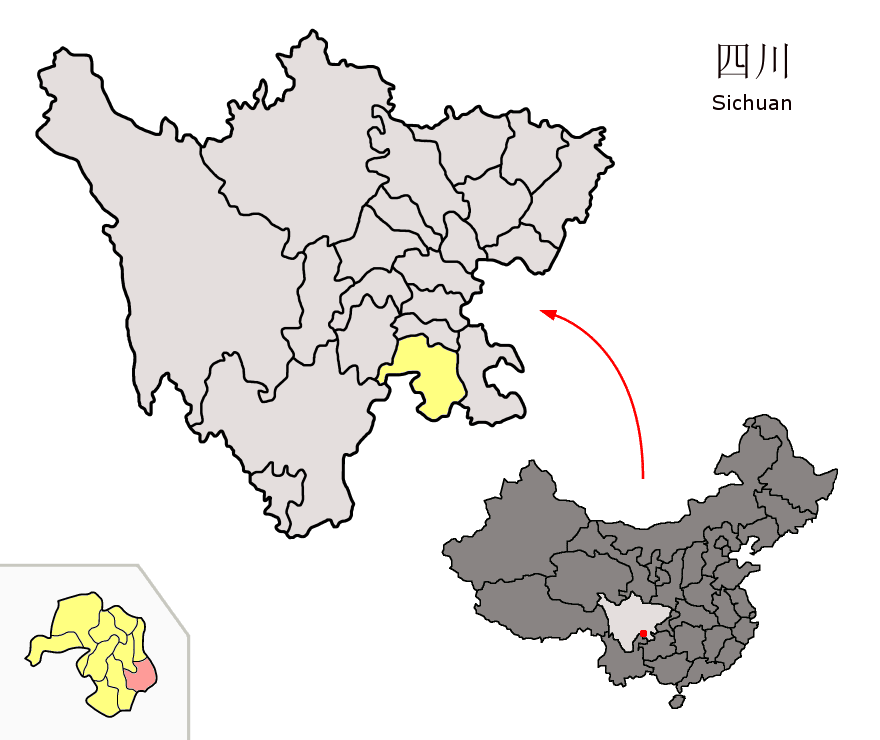
- Location of Xingwen County (red) within Yibin City (yellow) and Sichuan
- Coordinates: 28°18′13″N 105°14′11″E
- Country: China
- Province: Sichuan
- Prefecture-level city: Yibin

Area
  - Total: 1,373 km^{2} (530 sq mi)

Population (2020 census)
  - Total: 380,036
  - Density: 276.8/km^{2} (716.9/sq mi)
- Time zone: UTC+8 (China Standard)

Xingwen County (simplified Chinese: 兴文县; traditional Chinese: 興文縣; pinyin: Xīngwén Xiàn) is a county in Yibin, Sichuan, China. It is located in the southern part of Sichuan province and borders Yunnan and Guizhou provinces. It has become known for its Geopark, Xingwen Stoneforest, a Karst landscape.

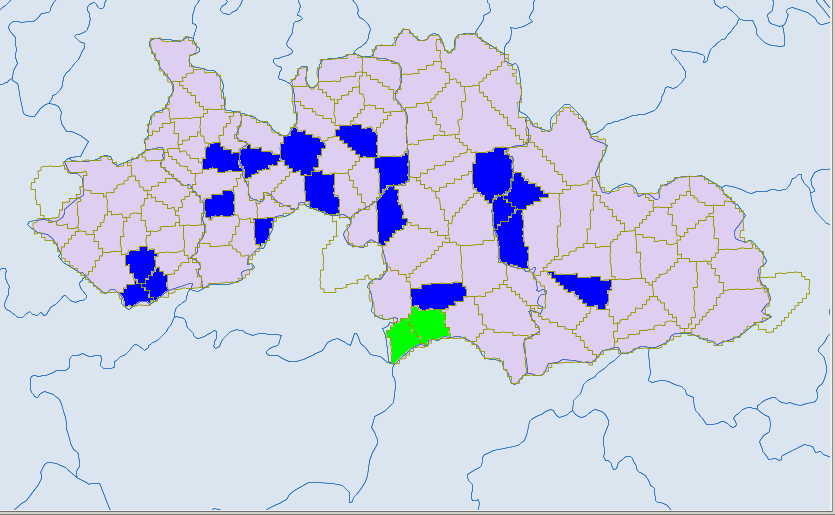
Ethnic townships in South Sichuan: Yibin and Luzhou. Light green -Yi. Blue - miao.

== Administrative divisions ==
Xingwen County comprises 8 towns and 4 ethnic townships:

towns

- Gusong 古宋镇
- Bowangshan 僰王山镇
- Gongle 共乐镇
- Lianhua 莲花镇
- Jiusicheng 九丝城镇
- Shihai 石海镇
- Zhoujia 周家镇
- Wuxing 五星镇

ethnic townships

- Daba Miao Ethnic Township 大坝苗族乡
- Dahe Miao Ethnic Township 大河苗族乡
- Qilin Miao Ethnic Township 麒麟苗族乡
- Xianfeng Miao Ethnic Township 仙峰苗族乡

== Climate ==
Climate data for Xingwen, elevation 367 m (1,204 ft), (1991–2020 normals, extremes 1981–present)
Month	Jan	Feb	Mar	Apr	May	Jun	Jul	Aug	Sep	Oct	Nov	Dec	Year
Record high °C (°F)	20.7 (69.3)	27.4 (81.3)	36.9 (98.4)	35.3 (95.5)	39.8 (103.6)	39.7 (103.5)	40.9 (105.6)	42.7 (108.9)	41.4 (106.5)	34.9 (94.8)	27.8 (82.0)	21.1 (70.0)	42.7 (108.9)
Mean daily maximum °C (°F)	10.5 (50.9)	13.7 (56.7)	18.7 (65.7)	24.3 (75.7)	27.5 (81.5)	29.3 (84.7)	32.7 (90.9)	32.7 (90.9)	27.6 (81.7)	21.5 (70.7)	17.4 (63.3)	11.8 (53.2)	22.3 (72.2)
Daily mean °C (°F)	7.7 (45.9)	10.1 (50.2)	14.2 (57.6)	19.0 (66.2)	22.2 (72.0)	24.4 (75.9)	27.2 (81.0)	27.0 (80.6)	23.0 (73.4)	18.0 (64.4)	13.9 (57.0)	9.0 (48.2)	18.0 (64.4)
Mean daily minimum °C (°F)	5.8 (42.4)	7.7 (45.9)	11.1 (52.0)	15.4 (59.7)	18.4 (65.1)	21.1 (70.0)	23.4 (74.1)	23.1 (73.6)	20.1 (68.2)	15.9 (60.6)	11.7 (53.1)	7.2 (45.0)	15.1 (59.1)
Record low °C (°F)	−0.8 (30.6)	0.0 (32.0)	3.2 (37.8)	6.0 (42.8)	10.1 (50.2)	15.0 (59.0)	17.4 (63.3)	18.0 (64.4)	13.1 (55.6)	8.2 (46.8)	1.8 (35.2)	−1.6 (29.1)	−1.6 (29.1)
Average precipitation mm (inches)	35.0 (1.38)	30.2 (1.19)	50.8 (2.00)	81.9 (3.22)	118.7 (4.67)	176.1 (6.93)	181.9 (7.16)	188.3 (7.41)	112.5 (4.43)	90.0 (3.54)	40.2 (1.58)	34.3 (1.35)	1,139.9 (44.86)
Average precipitation days (≥ 0.1 mm)	17.2	13.3	14.7	14.0	15.9	18.0	14.4	12.7	15.5	20.1	14.6	15.3	185.7
Average snowy days	0.2	0.1	0	0	0	0	0	0	0	0	0	0.1	0.4
Average relative humidity (%)	85	81	78	76	76	81	79	78	83	87	85	86	81
Mean monthly sunshine hours	30.9	42.4	80.6	111.7	111.1	98.7	167.1	169.4	95.5	47.7	48.2	30.2	1,033.5
Percentage possible sunshine	9	13	22	29	26	24	40	42	26	14	15	9	22
Source: China Meteorological Administration

== Cuisine ==
Xingwen Black-boned Chicken Feast: The Xingwen Black-boned Chicken Feast uses Xingwen Mountain Black-boned Chicken, a national geographical indication product, as its main ingredient.

Xingwen Liu's Wontons: Liu's wontons are characterized by their large size, smooth texture, refreshing taste, and fragrant aroma. When cooked, the broth is clear, and the wonton wrappers are thin and translucent.
