= Mantsinsaari Island =

Island in Russia

Native name: Остров Мантсинсаари
- Interactive map of Mantsinsaari Island

Geography
- Coordinates: 61°21′N 31°36′E
- Length: 14.5 km (9.01 mi)
- Width: 4 km (2.5 mi)

Administration
- Russia

Demographics
- Population: 1

Mantsinsaari Island (also Mantsi, Russian: Остров Мантсинсаари, Finnish: Mantsinsaari) is an island on the northeastern edge of Lake Ladoga, in the Salmi settlement, Pitkyaranta, Karelia. The island is nearly uninhabited.

Before World War II, when the island was a part of the Salmi municipality of Finland, it had around 1,500 inhabitants. The island did not have a bridge, instead utilising a cable ferry. The main sources of livelihood were agriculture, cultivation and fishing.

Mantsinsaari Island had an artillery battery, two 152-mm Canet 45 coastal artilleries. During the Winter War, the artillery was utilised by Finnish troops in battles to the north of Lake Ladoga. The Red Army was unable to conquer the island.
