= Buyang language =

Kra language spoken in China

Buyang
- Boux-yaeŋz
- Native to: China
- Region: Yunnan
- Ethnicity: Buyang people
- Native speakers: (1,500 cited 1997–2000)
- Language family: Kra–Dai: Kra; Yang–Biao; Buyang

Language codes
- ISO 639-3: Variously: yzg – E'ma Buyang yln – Langnian Buyang enc – En yrn – Yalang (Yerong)
- Glottolog: buya1244
- Yerong

Buyang (Chinese: 布央语) is a Kra language spoken in Guangnan and Funing counties, Yunnan Province, China by the Buyang people. It is important to the reconstruction of the hypothetical macrofamily Austro-Tai as it retains the disyllabic roots characteristic of Austronesian languages. Examples are /matɛ́/ "to die", /matá/ "eye", /qaðù/ "head", and /maðû/ "eight". (See Austro-Tai for proposed connections.)

The Buyang language was initially documented in 1990 by Chinese linguist Liang Min. In 1999, a doctoral dissertation and book was published for Buyang. The book has also recently been translated into English.

Many speakers of Buyang are also fluent in Zhuang.

== Subdivisions ==
The Buyang (布央) dialect cluster is spoken by a total of around 2,000 people living mostly in the Gula (谷拉) River valley of southeastern Yunnan Province. It is spoken in at least eight villages in Gula Township 谷拉乡, Funing County 富宁县, Wenshan Zhuang–Miao Autonomous Prefecture, Yunnan. Buyang is divided into the following groups:

- Langjia 郎架 is spoken in Langjia 郎架, Funing County 富宁县, Yunnan along the Guangxi border. It is split by Ethnologue into Langnian Buyang (ISO 639-3: yln) and E'ma Buyang (ISO 639-3: yzg). The name Langjia comes from Zhuang [laːŋ35 tɕaːi31], which means "dried bamboo shoot."
- Ecun 峨村 is spoken in Ecun 峨村, Funing County 富宁县, Yunnan along the Guangxi border.
- Yerong 雅郎, also called Yalhong, is spoken in Rongtun 荣屯 (near Longhe Township 龙合乡), Napo County 那坡, Guangxi. It is listed in Ethnologue as Yerong 耶容 (ISO 639-3: yrn).
- Baha (Paha) 巴哈 is considered a separate language by Weera Ostapirat (2000). It is spoken in Yangliancun 央连村 (jaaŋ24 lɛŋ31 in Zhuang), Diyu Township 底于乡 and Anshecun 安舍村, Bada Township 八达乡, which are both in Guangnan County 广南, Yunnan. It is listed in Ethnologue as Baha Buyang (ISO 639-3: yha).

Weera Ostapirat (2000) splits the Buyang language into two branches:

- North (Buyang Proper): Ecun and Langjia
- South: Yalang (Yalhong)

Ostapirat also classifies Buyang and Qabiao together as Eastern Kra, while Paha is classified as Central Kra. Together, the two branches form one of the two primary Kra branches, namely Central-East Kra. The En language has also been recently included in Eastern Kra (also called Yang–Biao, from [Bu]yang–[Pu]biao).

Li (2010) divides the Buyang language as follows:

Eastern

- The Funing County dialects of Ecun 峨村, Dugan 度干, Zhelong 者龙, Nada 那达, Longna 龙纳, Maguan 马贯, Langjia 郎架, and Nianlang 念郎. The Ecuns are known collectively as Buyang Bazhai 布央八寨, or "the eight Buyang villages." Together, they make up the largest group of Buyang speakers, numbering about 1,000 speakers collectively. Li further splits the Funing County Buyang dialects into 3 groups (listed from north to south):
  - Maguan 马贯
  - Ecun 峨村, Dugan 度干, Zhelong 者龙, Nada 那达, Longna 龙纳
  - Langjia 郎架, Nianlang 念郎
- Central Pohe Township 坡荷乡, Napo County, western Guangxi. More than 300 speakers reside in Rongtun 荣屯村 and Gonghe 共合村 villages, while over 100 live in Shanhe 善合, Yong'an 永安, and Guoba 果巴 villages; also in Renhecun 仁合村. 400 speakers total.

Western (Paha)

- In Guangnan County, Yanglian has around 500 Paha speakers, and Anshe only has about 100 speakers left. 600 speakers total.

Languages closely related to Buyang include Qabiao, En, and also Paha if considered a separate language.

== Phonology ==
The following are the sounds of the Funing dialects:

=== Consonants ===
		Labial		Dental/ Alveolar			(Alveolo-) palatal			Velar		Uvular	Glottal
		plain	pal.	plain	pal.	lab.	plain	lab.	pal.	plain	lab.	Uvular	Glottal
Nasal		m	mʲ	n			ɲ		ɲʲ	ŋ	ŋʷ		
Plosive	voiceless	p	pʲ	t	tʲ	tʷ				k	kʷ	q	ʔ
Plosive	aspirated	pʰ	pʰʲ	tʰ						kʰ		qʰ	
Plosive	glottalized	ˀb	ˀbʲ	ˀd	ˀdʲ	ˀdʷ							
Affricate	voiceless			ts	tsʲ	tsʷ							
Affricate	aspirated			tsʰ									
Fricative	voiceless	f		θ	θʲ	θʷ	ɕ	ɕʷ		x			h
Fricative	voiced			ð	ðʲ		ʑ	ʑʷ					
Lateral				l		lʷ							
Approximant		w					j						

- Seven consonants /m, n, ŋ, p, t, k, ʔ/ can occur as finals.

=== Vowels ===
	Front	Central	Back	
Close	i		ɯ	u
Close-mid	e	ə	o	
Open-mid	ɛ	ə	ɔ	
Open		a		

Diphthongs
	Front	Back	
Close	ai aːi	aɯ	au aːu, iu iːu
Mid	i.e., ue	uə, eu	

- Vowels /i, u, ɯ/ can occur as finals.

== Diachronic evolution of consonants ==
Pre-Buyang, the stage in the evolution of the language that can be reconstructed from internal evidence, appears to have had a slightly different phonemic inventory than the modern dialects: a voiced stop *ɢ paired with *q, as well as voiced *ɦ alongside *h, and a pair of sibilants *s, *z. In addition, it doesn't appear to have had a series of aspirated consonants, a condition still found in the Ecun dialect. Thus reconstructed pre-Buyang is more similar in its phonemic inventory to reconstructed Proto-Austronesian than is any modern dialect of Buyang.
