= Maang language =

Sino-Tibetan language spoken in China

Maang
- Mo'ang
- Native to: China
- Region: Funing County, Yunnan
- Ethnicity: Yi
- Native speakers: (5,000 cited 1982)
- Language family: Sino-Tibetan: Lolo-Burmese; Mondzish; Maang

Language codes
- ISO 639-3: None (mis)
- Glottolog: maan1239
- ELP: Mo'ang

Maang (Chinese: 么昂语; autonym: maːŋ33 or mӕ̠aŋ33) or Mo'ang (Chinese: 末昂语; autonym: mɯaŋ51) is a Lolo-Burmese language of Wenshan Prefecture, Yunnan, China and northern Vietnam. The Maang are also locally referred to as the Gāokùjiǎo Yí (高裤脚彝; "High-Trousered Yi") by other local ethnic groups (Zhou 2014:1).

Lama (2012) classifies Maang within the Mondzish branch of Lolo–Burmese. Maang has many Zhuang (Central Tai) loanwords (Wang 2018).

== Distribution ==
Zhou (2014:1-2) reports that Mo'ang is spoken in the following villages.

- Banlun township 板仑乡, Funing County, Yunnan
  - Longyang 龙洋 (Maang, Zhuang, and Han Chinese residents)
  - Longmai 龙迈
  - Mula 木腊 (Maang, Zhuang, and Han Chinese residents)
  - Gongjinwei 公金渭
  - Kela 克拉
- Mugan 木甘, Niuchang village 牛场村, Lida town 里达镇 (Maang, Zhuang residents)
- Muxiongping village 木兄坪村, Muyang town 木央镇
  - Zhilun 直伦 (Maang and Miao residents)
  - Upper Muyang 上木羊 (Maang and Miao residents)
  - Lower Muyang 下木羊 (Maang and Miao residents)
- Xiaomulun 小睦伦, Muyang town 木央镇 (Han Chinese, Maang, and Yao residents)
- Ligong 里拱, Lida town 里达镇, Funing County, Yunnan (also 12 other villages in Lida town 里达镇)
- The villages of Zhechang 者长, Dana 达那, Nianbi 念必 in Napo County, Guangxi province

There are 713 households and 4,079 individuals according to a 2003 estimate by the Funing County government (Zhou 2014:1).
