= Napo County =

Napo 那坡县 · Nazboh Yen
- County
- Location of the seat in Guangxi
- Coordinates: 23°23′13″N 105°49′59″E
- Country: China
- Autonomous region: Guangxi
- Prefecture-level city: Baise
- County seat: Chengxiang

Area
  - Total: 2,230 km^{2} (860 sq mi)

Population (2020)
  - Total: 171,781
  - Density: 77.0/km^{2} (200/sq mi)
- Time zone: UTC+8 (China Standard)
- Postal code: 533900

Napo County (Chinese: 那坡县; pinyin: Nàpō Xiàn; Zhuang: Nazboh Yen) is a county in the west of Guangxi, China, bordering Yunnan province to the north and northwest as well as Vietnam's Cao Bằng and Hà Giang provinces to the south and west, respectively. It is under the administration of Baise city.

== Geography ==
Napo County borders Jingxi, Guangxi to the east, Funing County, Yunnan to the north and northwest, the Mèo Vạc District of Hà Giang Province, Vietnam to the west, and Bảo Lạc District, Bảo Lâm District and Hà Quảng District of Cao Bằng Province, Vietnam to the south. It is located in southwestern Guangxi.

== Administrative divisions ==
Napo County is divided into 3 towns and 6 townships:

towns

- Chengxiang 城厢镇
- Pingmeng 平孟镇
- Longhe 龙合镇

townships

- Pohe 坡荷乡
- Delong 德隆乡
- Baihe 百合乡
- Bainan 百南乡
- Baisheng 百省乡
- Baidu 百都乡

== Demographics ==
Ethnic groups in Napo County include the following (Napo County Gazetteer).

- Han Chinese
- Zhuang people
- Buyang people
- Miao people
  - White Miao 白苗
- Yao people
  - Landian Yao 蓝靛瑶; autonyms: Xiumen 秀门, Jinmen 金门
  - Daban Yao 大板瑶; autonym: Mian 勉
- Yi people
  - White Yi 白彝
  - Red Yi 红彝

=== Zhuang ===
The "Buzhuang" 布壮 (including the Black-Clothed Zhuang 黑衣壮, or Min 敏) are located in Chengxiang 城厢, Pohe 坡荷, Longhe 龙合, Delong 德隆, Baidu 百都, Bainan 百南, Baihe 百合, Pingmeng 平孟, Baisheng 百省等乡; 461 villages.

- Buyang 布央
- Budong 布峒
- Bunong 布农
- Buyi 布依
- Burui 布锐
- Bu'ao 布嗷
- Busheng 布省
- Bujue 布决
- Buyong 布拥

=== Yi ===
In Napo County, ethnic Yi are located in the following villages.

- Chengxiang Township 城厢镇 (the county seat)
  - Dala 达腊
  - Zhexiang 者祥
  - Nianbi 念毕
- Powu, Baisheng Township 百省乡坡五彝寨

The Napo County Gazetteer (那坡县志) reports two subgroups of ethnic Yi, with respective names and geographic distributions.

- White Yi 白彝 (White Lolo 白倮倮); also called Gaokujiao Yi 高裤脚彝, Qunku Yi 裙裤彝; autonym: Mangzuo 芒佐. Located in the following villages:
  - Dala 达腊 of Dala Village 达腊村, Chengxiang Township 城厢镇
  - Nianbi 念毕 of Dala Village 达腊村, Chengxiang Township 城厢镇
  - Zhexiang 者祥 of Nianjia Village 念甲村, Chengxiang Township 城厢镇
  - Yanhua 岩华 of Nianjia Village 念甲村, Chengxiang Township 城厢镇
  - Pobao 坡报 of Bajiaoping Village 芭蕉坪村, Nalong Township 那隆乡
  - Dawang 达汪 of Gemen Village 各门村, Nalong Township 那隆乡
  - Xiameyao 下么要/爱 of Bajiaoping Village 芭蕉坪村, Nalong Township 那隆乡
- Red Yi 红彝 (Red Lolo 红倮倮); also called Red-Head Yi 红头彝, Huayao Yi 花腰彝; autonyms: Mangji 芒集, Mieji 乜集
  - Xiahua Township 下华乡 area
    - Powu 坡五/伍 of Mianliang Village 面良村, Baisheng Township 百省乡
    - Pokang 坡康屯 of Mianliang Village 面良村, Baisheng Township 百省乡

== Climate ==
Climate data for Napo, elevation 856 m (2,808 ft), (1991–2020 normals, extremes 1981–2010)
Month	Jan	Feb	Mar	Apr	May	Jun	Jul	Aug	Sep	Oct	Nov	Dec	Year
Record high °C (°F)	27.2 (81.0)	31.0 (87.8)	32.6 (90.7)	35.6 (96.1)	35.8 (96.4)	33.9 (93.0)	34.9 (94.8)	34.7 (94.5)	35.2 (95.4)	31.5 (88.7)	29.5 (85.1)	27.9 (82.2)	35.8 (96.4)
Mean daily maximum °C (°F)	15.3 (59.5)	17.8 (64.0)	21.5 (70.7)	25.9 (78.6)	28.2 (82.8)	29.3 (84.7)	29.5 (85.1)	29.7 (85.5)	28.1 (82.6)	24.6 (76.3)	21.4 (70.5)	17.0 (62.6)	24.0 (75.2)
Daily mean °C (°F)	11.5 (52.7)	13.7 (56.7)	17.0 (62.6)	21.0 (69.8)	23.4 (74.1)	24.8 (76.6)	24.9 (76.8)	24.3 (75.7)	22.7 (72.9)	19.8 (67.6)	16.3 (61.3)	12.4 (54.3)	19.3 (66.8)
Mean daily minimum °C (°F)	9.0 (48.2)	11.0 (51.8)	14.1 (57.4)	17.8 (64.0)	20.2 (68.4)	22.0 (71.6)	22.1 (71.8)	21.4 (70.5)	19.5 (67.1)	16.9 (62.4)	13.1 (55.6)	9.4 (48.9)	16.4 (61.5)
Record low °C (°F)	−1.1 (30.0)	0.4 (32.7)	0.1 (32.2)	7.9 (46.2)	9.6 (49.3)	12.5 (54.5)	14.4 (57.9)	16.0 (60.8)	11.4 (52.5)	5.5 (41.9)	0.7 (33.3)	−3.6 (25.5)	−3.6 (25.5)
Average precipitation mm (inches)	29.8 (1.17)	17.0 (0.67)	40.0 (1.57)	61.5 (2.42)	147.1 (5.79)	262.5 (10.33)	261.2 (10.28)	253.2 (9.97)	148.3 (5.84)	82.8 (3.26)	38.2 (1.50)	23.2 (0.91)	1,364.8 (53.71)
Average precipitation days (≥ 0.1 mm)	9.4	7.5	8.8	10.7	15.0	19.1	20.8	19.9	12.9	11.0	8.0	6.6	149.7
Average snowy days	0.2	0	0	0	0	0	0	0	0	0	0	0	0.2
Average relative humidity (%)	79	77	76	75	76	80	82	82	81	80	79	78	79
Mean monthly sunshine hours	63.7	80.3	98.7	132.4	140.6	110.6	119.3	137.8	126.9	100.5	106.0	89.0	1,305.8
Percentage possible sunshine	19	25	26	35	34	27	29	35	35	28	32	27	29
Source: China Meteorological Administration
