= Guangnan County =

Guangnan County 广南县 · Gvangjnanz Yen
- County
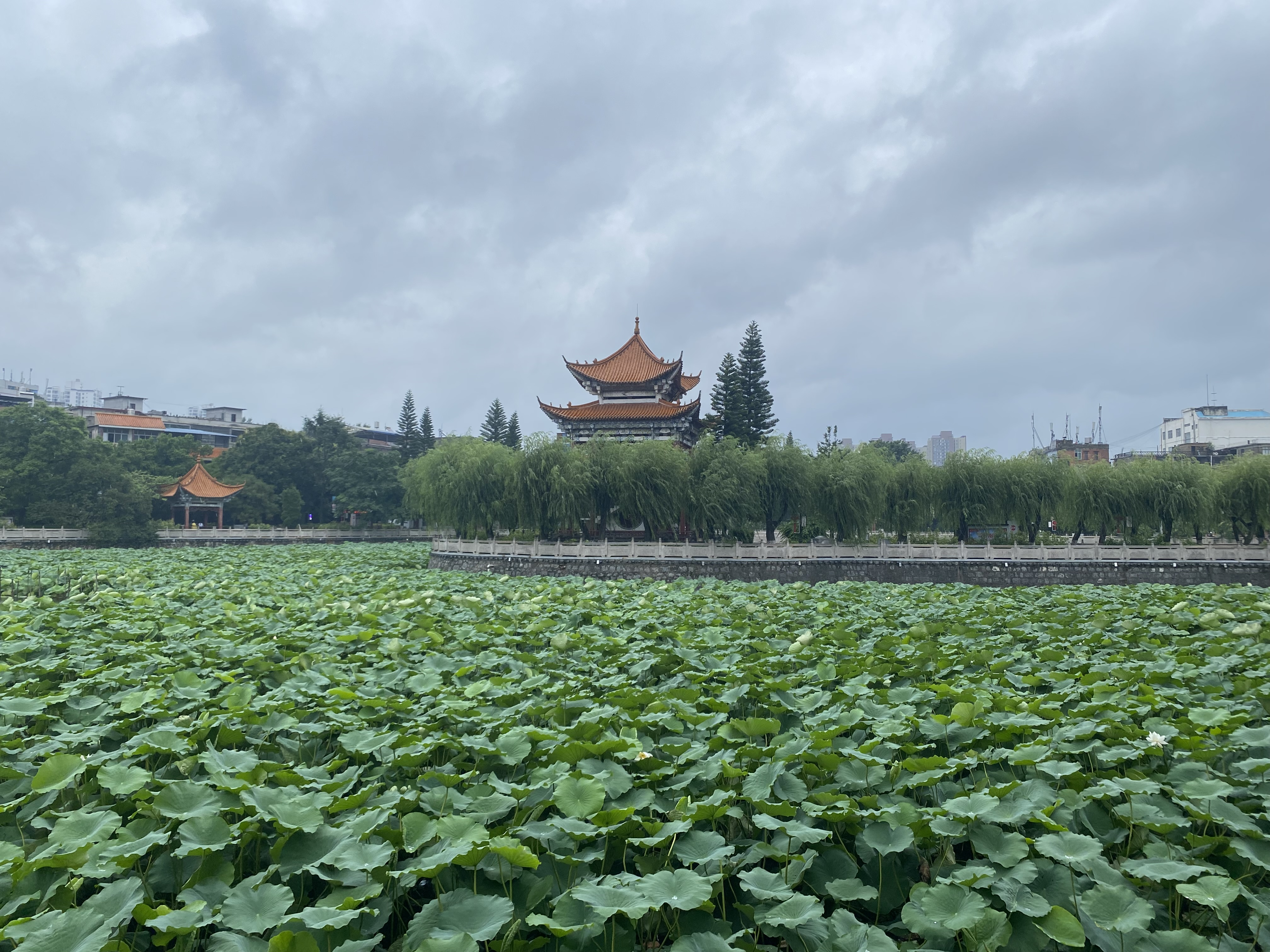
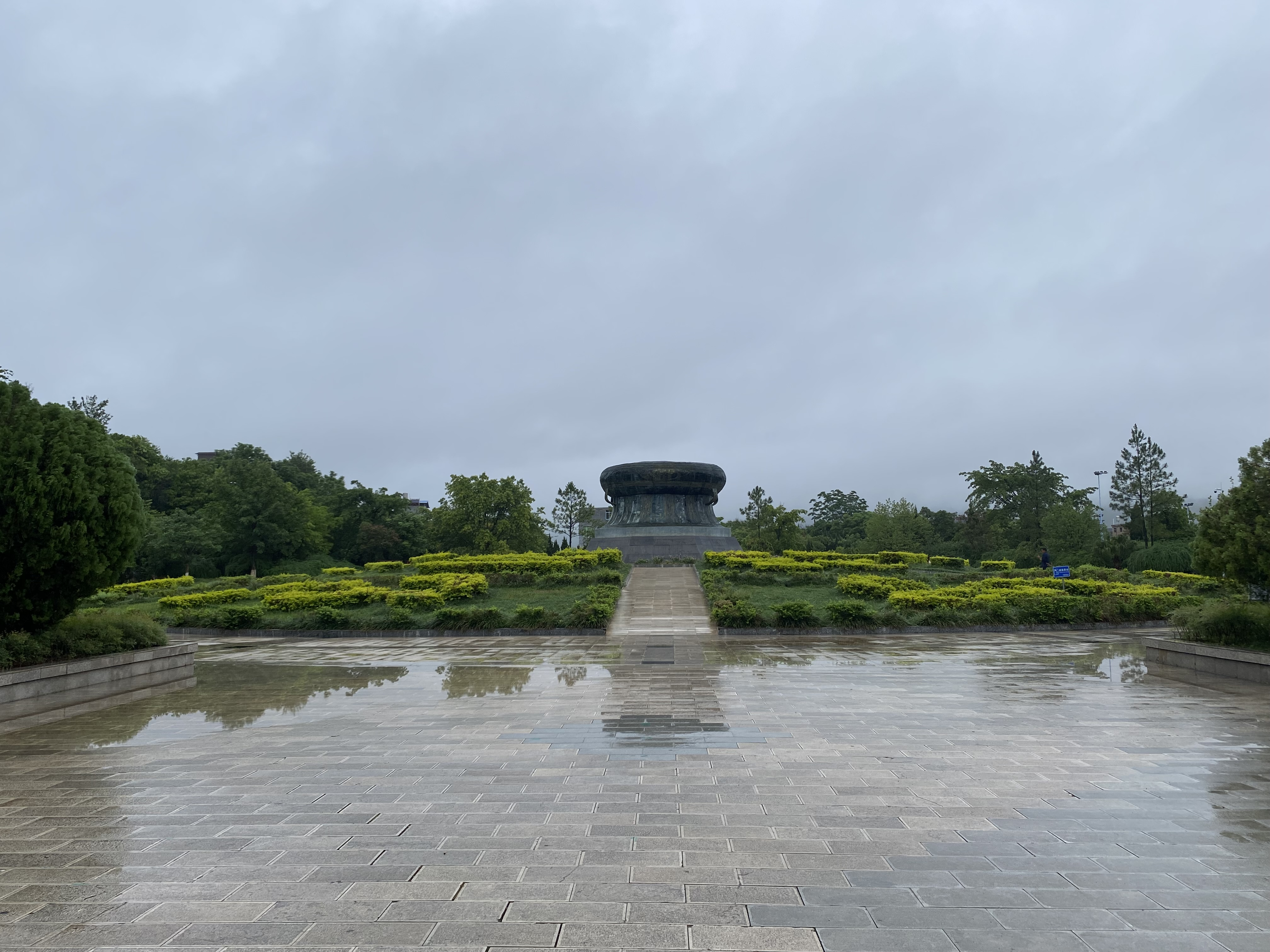
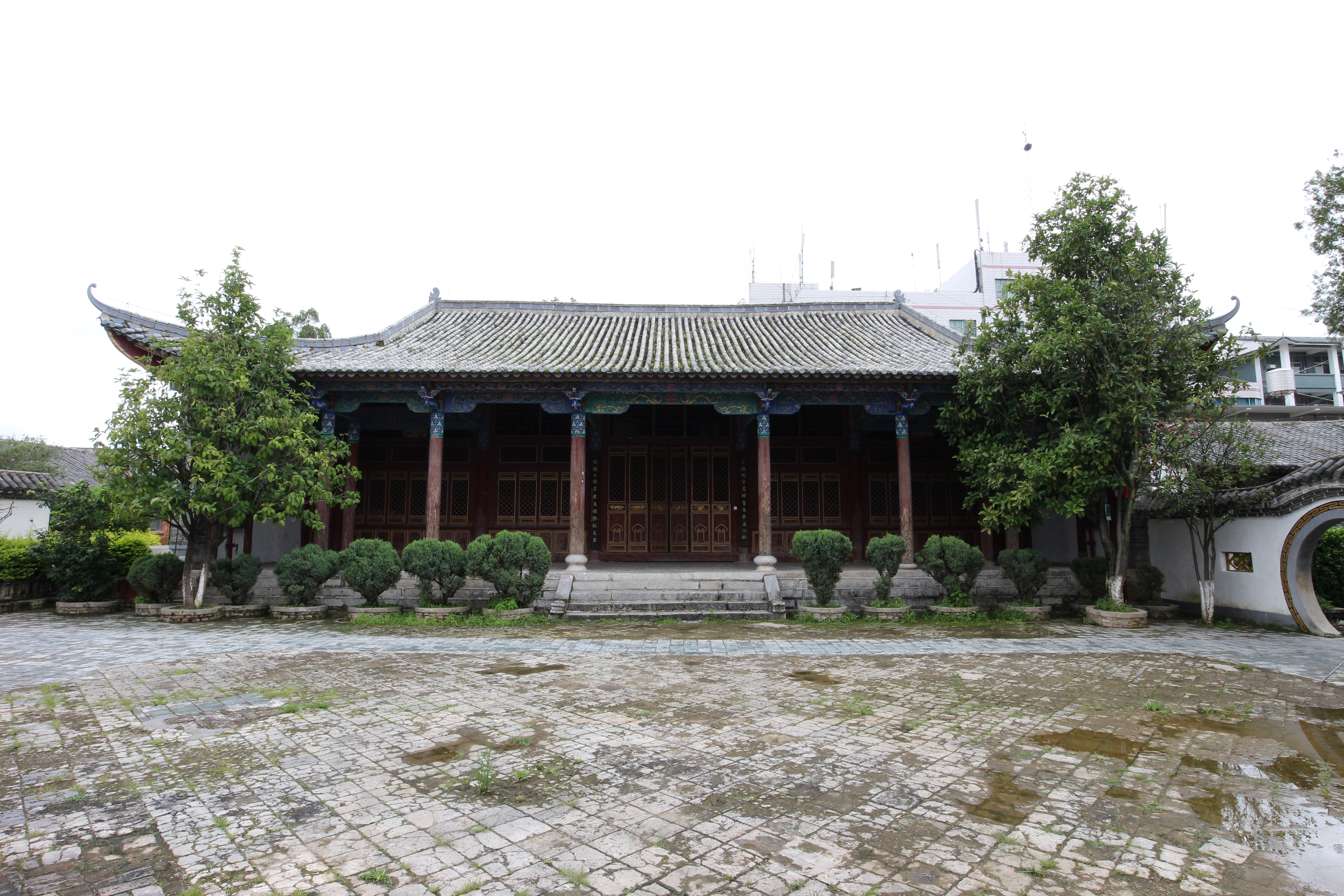
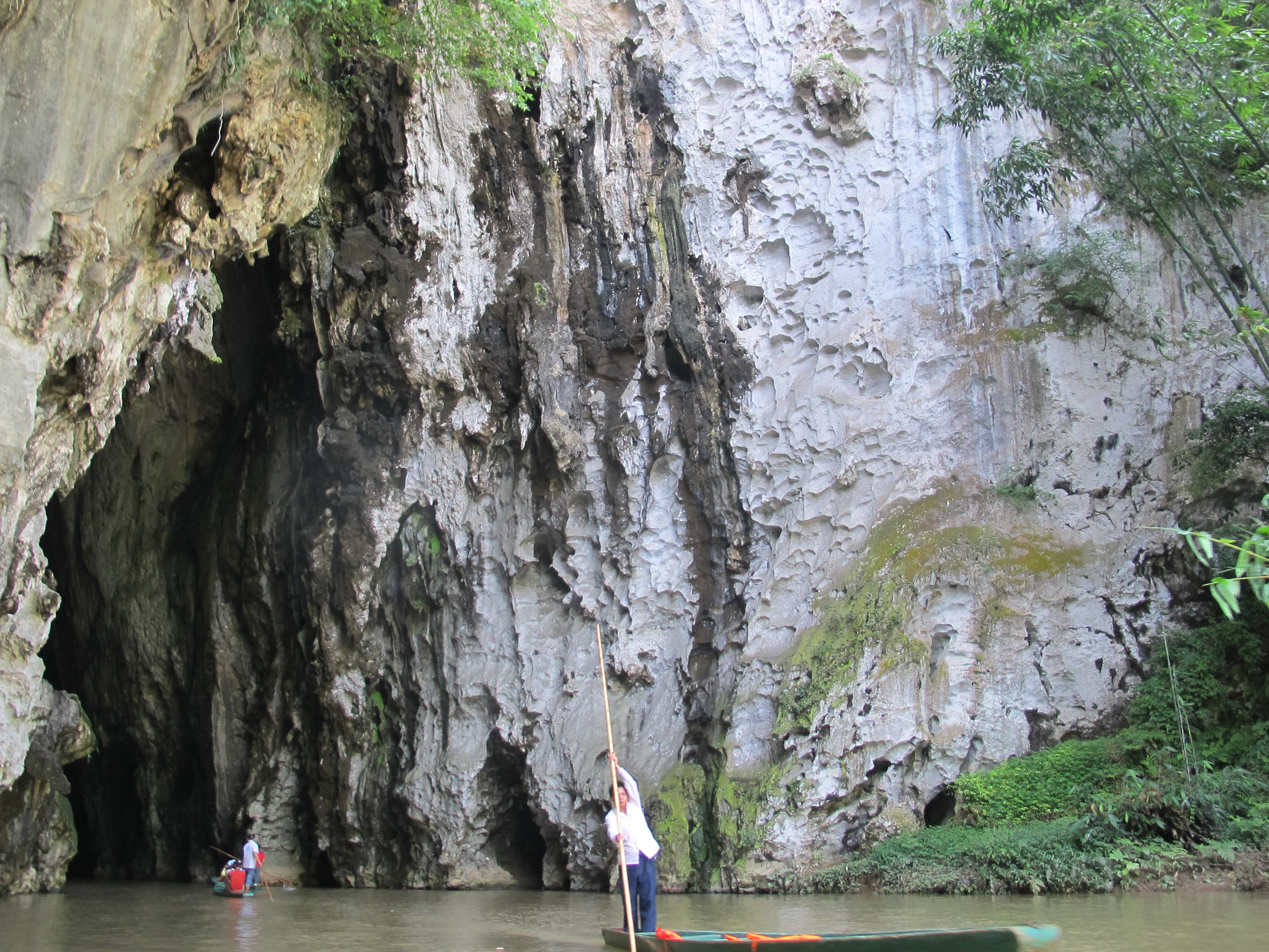
- Lianhu Park Bronze Drum Square Nong's Tusi Chiefdom Office Bamei village

- Location of Guangnan County (red) within Wenshan Prefecture (pink) and Yunnan

- Location of the seat in Yunnan
- Coordinates: 24°03′N 105°04′E
- Country: China
- Province: Yunnan
- Autonomous prefecture: Wenshan
- County seat: Liancheng

Area
  - Total: 7,983 km^{2} (3,082 sq mi)

Population (2020 census)
  - Total: 771,948
  - Density: 96.70/km^{2} (250.4/sq mi)
- Postal code: 663300
- Area code: 0876
- Website: www.yngn.gov.cn

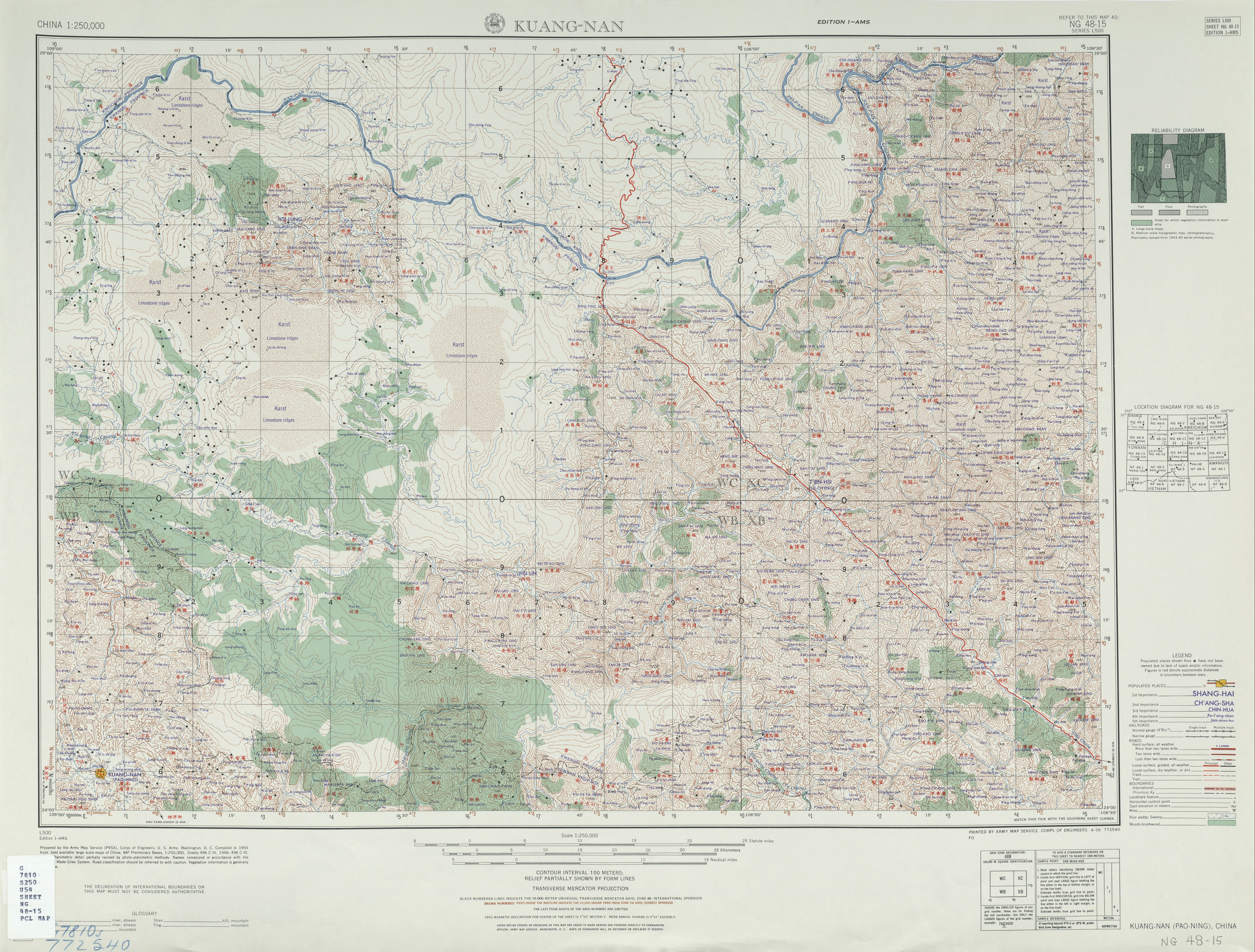
Guangnan (labelled as KUANG-NAN (PAO-NING) 廣南 (寶寧)) (1954)

Guangnan County (simplified Chinese: 广南县; traditional Chinese: 廣南縣; pinyin: Guǎngnán Xiàn; Zhuang: Gvangjnanz Yen) is located in Wenshan Zhuang and Miao Autonomous Prefecture, Yunnan province, China. The seat of Guangnan, known today as Liancheng (莲城镇), was the heart of the Gouding Kingdom (句町) that lasted approximately 400 years, from 111 BC to 316 AD. Guangnan County is bordered by Xilin County, Guangxi Zhuang Autonomous Region to the north, Funing County, Yunnan to the east, Malipo County and Xichou County to the south, and Yanshan County, Yunnan and Qiubei County to the west.

== Administrative divisions ==
In the present, Guangnan County has 7 towns and 11 townships.

7 towns

- Liancheng (莲城镇)
- Babao (八宝镇)
- Nanping (南屏镇)
- Zhujie (珠街镇)
- Nasa (那洒镇)
- Zhulin (珠琳镇)
- Bamei (坝美镇)

11 townships

- Dongbao (董堡乡)
- Jiumo (旧莫乡)
- Yangliujing (杨柳井乡)
- Banbang (板蚌乡)
- Shuguang (曙光乡)
- Heizhiguo (黑支果乡)
- Zhuanjiao (篆角乡)
- Wuzhu (五珠乡)
- Zhetu (者兔乡)
- Zhetai (者太乡)
- Diwei (底圩乡)

== Climate ==
Guangnan, as with much of southern Yunnan, has a warm humid subtropical climate (Köppen Cwa), with muddled distinction between the seasons and daytime temperatures remaining warm year-round. The warmest and coolest months are July and January, respectively at 23.2 °C (73.8 °F) and 9.1 °C (48.4 °F); the annual mean is 17.4 °C (63.3 °F). May thru September accounts for nearly 75% of the annual rainfall of 1,016 mm (40 in)

Climate data for Guangnan, elevation 1,250 m (4,100 ft), (1991–2020 normals, extremes 1981–present)
Month	Jan	Feb	Mar	Apr	May	Jun	Jul	Aug	Sep	Oct	Nov	Dec	Year
Record high °C (°F)	28.4 (83.1)	31.2 (88.2)	34.0 (93.2)	36.2 (97.2)	37.6 (99.7)	34.8 (94.6)	34.0 (93.2)	33.6 (92.5)	34.0 (93.2)	32.5 (90.5)	30.0 (86.0)	28.6 (83.5)	37.6 (99.7)
Mean daily maximum °C (°F)	15.3 (59.5)	18.3 (64.9)	22.8 (73.0)	26.4 (79.5)	27.7 (81.9)	28.1 (82.6)	28.2 (82.8)	27.8 (82.0)	26.1 (79.0)	22.9 (73.2)	20.4 (68.7)	16.1 (61.0)	23.3 (74.0)
Daily mean °C (°F)	9.1 (48.4)	11.6 (52.9)	15.5 (59.9)	19.7 (67.5)	21.9 (71.4)	23.0 (73.4)	23.2 (73.8)	22.4 (72.3)	20.7 (69.3)	17.7 (63.9)	14.1 (57.4)	10.0 (50.0)	17.4 (63.4)
Mean daily minimum °C (°F)	5.2 (41.4)	7.0 (44.6)	10.6 (51.1)	14.8 (58.6)	17.6 (63.7)	19.6 (67.3)	19.9 (67.8)	19.1 (66.4)	17.2 (63.0)	14.4 (57.9)	10.0 (50.0)	6.1 (43.0)	13.5 (56.2)
Record low °C (°F)	−2.9 (26.8)	−1.1 (30.0)	−1.0 (30.2)	4.3 (39.7)	6.6 (43.9)	12.3 (54.1)	13.8 (56.8)	12.9 (55.2)	8.7 (47.7)	4.2 (39.6)	−0.8 (30.6)	−4.8 (23.4)	−4.8 (23.4)
Average precipitation mm (inches)	20.6 (0.81)	17.0 (0.67)	31.9 (1.26)	54.9 (2.16)	130.7 (5.15)	182.8 (7.20)	196.7 (7.74)	179.6 (7.07)	92.6 (3.65)	61.3 (2.41)	27.8 (1.09)	20.5 (0.81)	1,016.4 (40.02)
Average precipitation days (≥ 0.1 mm)	9.1	7.8	7.5	9.5	13.5	17.3	18.2	18.1	12.4	11.2	7.0	6.5	138.1
Average snowy days	1.0	0.3	0.1	0	0	0	0	0	0	0	0	0.2	1.6
Average relative humidity (%)	79	74	70	68	71	79	80	83	81	82	79	80	77
Mean monthly sunshine hours	116.0	133.7	160.3	172.6	171.9	124.1	135.0	135.4	117.7	106.9	134.1	116.7	1,624.4
Percentage possible sunshine	35	42	43	45	42	31	33	34	32	30	41	35	37
Source: China Meteorological Administrationall-time October record

== Ethnic groups ==
The following information in this section is from the Guangnan County Gazetteer (广南县志) (2001).

- Han
- Zhuang
- Miao
  - White Miao 白苗 (or Menglou 蒙娄)
  - Sinicized Miao 汉苗 a.k.a. Lopsided Miao 偏苗 (or Mengsha 蒙纱)
  - "Meng Zhua" (蒙爪)
- Yao
  - Landian [Blue Indigo] Yao 蓝靛瑶 (or Jinmen 金门)
  - Daban [Large Board] Yao 大板瑶 (or Yu Mian 育棉)
- Yi: split into two official divisions of Pu 仆 and Luo 倮. Autonyms are: Nisupo 尼苏颇, Guo 果, Poluo 颇罗 (exonym: Axi 阿细), Nishebei 尼舍杯, Nashepu 哪舍噗, Bugeng 布更, Gasou 嘎叟, Guwo 估涡, Mengpei 孟培, Mengpu 孟噗, Mengguobei 孟果杯, Lairen 徕人 (exonym: Laizi 徕子)
  - Pu 仆: Flowery Pula 花仆拉 (also called Pula 濮喇), White Pula 白仆拉, Black Pula 黑仆拉
  - Luo 倮: Flowery Luo 花倮, Black Luo 黑倮, Chinese Luo 汉倮, Sandaohong 三道红, Lairen 徕人
- Gelao
- Hui
- Mongol

Ethnic Zhuang and Han make up about 80% of the county's population, with each group making up about 40%.

=== Miao ===
There were 81,223 ethnic Miao individuals comprising 16,086 households as of 1995.

- White Miao 白苗: most of the county, including Nalun 那伦乡 and Diyu 底于乡
- Sinicized Miao 汉苗: Heizhiguo 黑支果乡, Nanping 南屏镇, Babao 八宝镇
- "Meng Zhua" (蒙爪): Yanshang of Heizhiguo 黑支果乡岩上, Dongguaping of Nanping 南屏镇冬瓜坪, Sala of Yangliujing 杨柳井洒啦

=== Yao ===
There were 14,707 ethnic Yao individuals comprising 2,673 households as of 1995.

- Diyu Township (1,831 individuals, 323 households)
- Babao Township (1,612 individuals, 281 households)
- Zhetai Township (1,176 individuals, 175 households)
- Jiumo Township (1,157 individuals, 226 households)
- Yangliujing Township (1,092 individuals, 216 households)
- Nasa Township (992 individuals, 188 households)
- Heizhiguo Township (963 individuals, 165 households)

=== Yi ===
There were 35,879 ethnic Yi individuals comprising 7,001 households as of 1995, making up 5.21% of the county's total population.

- Nisupo 尼苏颇: Longyang 龙秧, Zhetai 者太乡
- Guo 果: Weinaji 未那基, Zhetai 者太乡
- Guopo 果颇: Lao'an 老安, Zhetu 者兔乡
- Poguo 颇果 (or Pula 仆拉): Anwang 安王, Nanping 南屏镇
- Gasou 嘎叟: Anwang 安王, Nanping 南屏镇
- Guwo 估涡: Mumei 木媄, Babao 八宝镇
- Mengpei 孟培 (or Lairen 徕人): Wabiao 瓦标, Babao 八宝镇; Yilang 夷郎, Heizhiguo 黑支果乡
- Meng 孟: Lisa 里洒, Babao 八宝镇
- Mengpu 孟噗: Dagulu 大咕噜, Heizhiguo 黑支果乡
- Bugeng 布更: Walong 挖聋, Nasa 那洒镇; Amiao 阿渺, Zhuanjiao 篆角乡
- Nashepu 那舍噗: Changchong 长冲, Zhujie 珠街镇
- Kashepu 卡舍噗: Tuanqing 团箐, Shuguang 曙光镇
- Axi 阿细: Zhongzhai 中寨, Zhulin 珠琳镇

=== Gelao ===
There are 157 ethnic Gelao.

- Baishiyan 白石岩, Laozhai 老寨村, Babao Township 八宝镇 (56 people)
- Xijide 西基得村, Zhulin Township 珠琳镇 (50 people)
- Muyang 木秧, Shujie 鼠街村, Heizhiguo Township 黑支果乡 (29 people)

=== Hui ===
There were 1,306 ethnic Hui individuals comprising 314 households as of 1995. Most lived in Zhulin Township, which had 964 ethnic Hui individuals comprising 212 households. Liancheng Township, the county seat, had 161 ethnic Hui individuals comprising 51 households.

=== Mongol ===
There are 497 ethnic Mongols.

- Heizhiguo 黑支果村, Heizhiguo Township 黑支果乡 (132 people, 23 households)
- Longtan 龙滩村, Heizhiguo Township 黑支果乡 (126 people, 25 households)
- Shujie 鼠街村, Heizhiguo Township 黑支果乡 (24 people, 5 households)
- Liancheng Township (75 people)
- Zhuanjiao Township (65 people)
- Shuguang Township (52 people)

== Transport ==
- Nearest airport: Wenshan Airport

== Historical sites ==
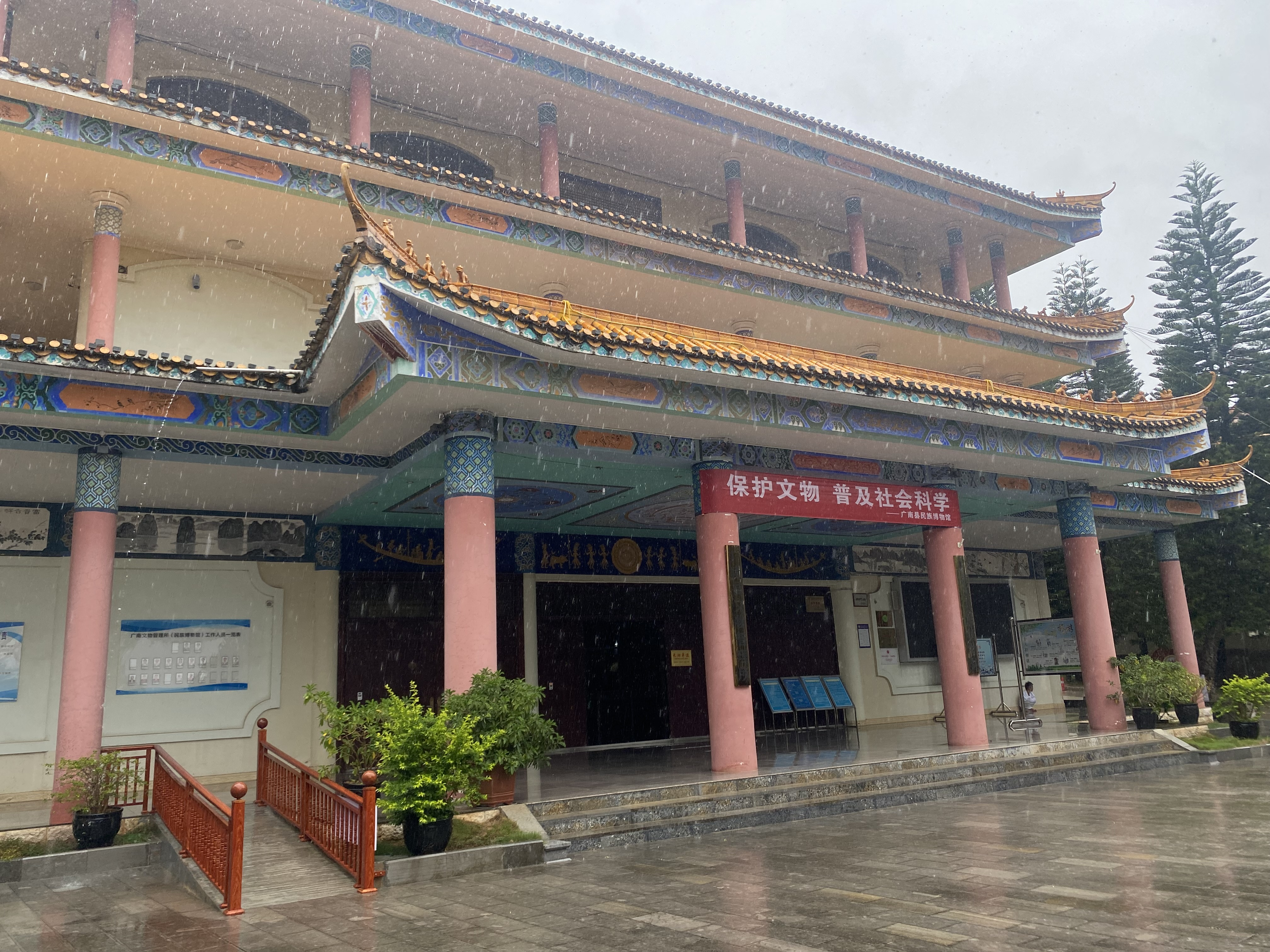
Guangnan Minorities Museum

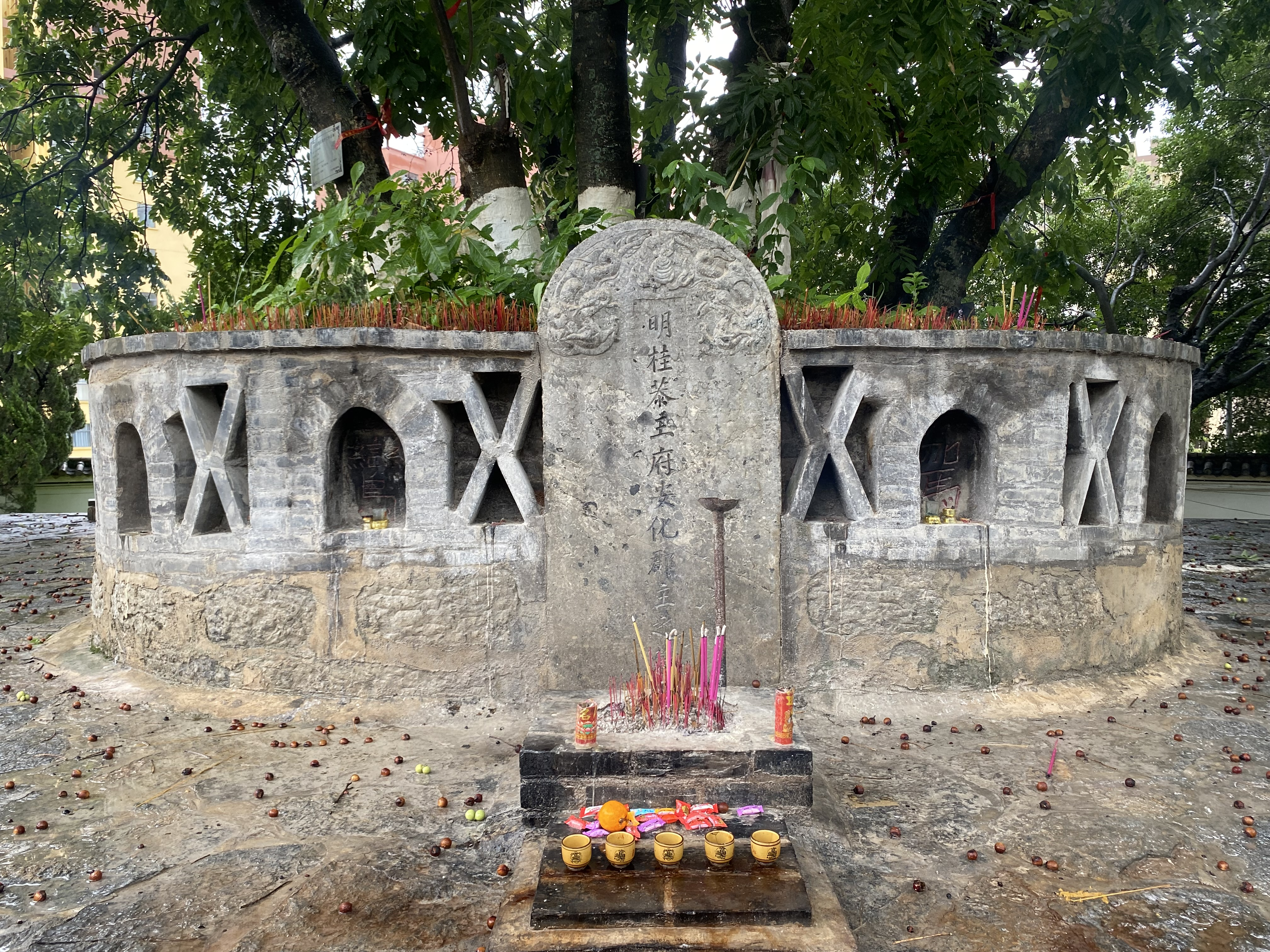
Grave of Princess Anhua

- Guangnan Minorities Museum: Featuring numerous neolithic and Bronze Age artifacts unearthed from tombs in the region, in addition to more modern Ming and Qing Dynasty objects (paintings, porcelain, wooden architectural features) collected from the town and nearby villages.
- Grave of Princess Anhua (安化郡主). The 16-year-old princess, a full sister of the last (Southern) Ming emperor Zhu Youlang (the Yongli Emperor), died near Guangnan town in 1652, when the emperor was retreating from Guangxi to Yunnan.
- Ayong Bridge: built on the outstrected branches of trees from the two banks of the river
- Ayong ancestral home of the Nong clan
- Guima Bridge: a traditional wind-and-rain bridge that is the center for folk singing and recreation
- Guima Hall of the Elders
- Wang Peilun's Residence: Xiban Village 夕板村, Guangnan
- The Tinglang (rest kiosks) of Xiban Village 夕板村, Guangnan
- The ganlan houses of Tuotong Village 拖同村 and Dixian Village 底仙村
- Yanta Pagoda (a.k.a. Wenbi Pagoda): a 19th-century tower atop a prominent summit to the southeast of the city, offering excellent views of the surrounding region.

Historical villages include:

- Heye 河野村
- Tuopai 拖派村
- Dixian 底仙村: notable for its unique ganlan houses found only there
- Nabei 那贝村
- Tuotong 拖同村
- Gejia 革假村: notable for its thousand-year-old banyan tree, and for its many natives who passed the civil examination to become jinshi 进士 (palace candidates) during the Qing Dynasty
- Ayong 阿用
- Guima 贵马
- Jiumo (旧莫) includes a former residence of a Nationalist warlord now defaced, poorly restored and in use as an agricultural store and communist memorial site, in addition to a covered bridge. Hard to reach and not set up for tourists, there is barely a restaurant.
