= Lolo-Burmese languages =

Sino-Tibetan language group of Southeast Asia

Lolo-Burmese
- Geographic distribution: Southeast Asia and southern China
- Linguistic classification: Sino-Tibetan: Tibeto-Burman; Burmo-Qiangic?; Lolo-Burmese
- Subdivisions: Mondzish; Burmish; Loloish; ? Mruic

Language codes
- Glottolog: lolo1265

The Lolo-Burmese languages (also Burmic languages) of Burma, southern China and inland areas of Southeast Asia form a coherent branch of the Sino-Tibetan family.

== Names ==
Until ca. 1950, the endonym Lolo was written with derogatory characters in Chinese, and for this reason has sometimes been avoided. Shafer (1966–1974) used the term "Burmic" for the Lolo-Burmese languages. The Chinese term is Mian–Yi, after the Chinese name for Burmese and one of several words for Tai, reassigned to replace Lolo by the Chinese government after 1950.

== Possible languages ==
The position of Naxi (Moso) within the family is unclear, and it is often left as a third branch besides Loloish and Burmish. Lama (2012) considers it to be a branch of Loloish, while Guillaume Jacques has suggested that it is a Qiangic language.

The Pyu language that preceded Burmese in Burma is sometimes linked to the Lolo-Burmese family, but there is no good evidence for any particular classification.

Löffler (1966) and Bradley (1997) consider the Mru language to be closely related to or part of Lolo-Burmese, while Matisoff includes Mruic in the Northeast Indian areal group.

Three Bailang songs were reportedly recorded in Chinese characters in the 1st century, and survive in quotations from the 7th century. The transmission through Chinese makes interpretation difficult, but most authors believe the language to be Lolo-Burmese or a close relative.

== External relationships ==
Guillaume Jacques & Alexis Michaud (2011) argue for a Burmo-Qiangic branch with two primary subbranches, Na-Qiangic (i.e. Naxi-Qiangic) and Lolo-Burmese. Similarly, David Bradley (2008) also proposes an Eastern Tibeto-Burman branch that includes the two subbranches of Burmic (a.k.a. Lolo-Burmese) and Qiangic.

== Internal classification ==
Bradley (1997, quoted in Peiros 1997) gives the following classification for the Lolo-Burmese languages. In later publications, in place of Loloish, David Bradley instead uses the term Ngwi based on a conservative autonym in the Sanie language.

- Lolo-Burmese
  - Mru
  - Core Lolo-Burmese
    - Ugong–Burmish
      - Ugong
      - Burmish
    - Loloish (Ngwi)

Lama (2012), in a study of 36 languages, finds the Mondzish cluster (Mondzi–Maang, Mantsi–Mo'ang) to be divergent. He did not include Mru or Ugong.

- Lolo-Burmese (Niso-Burmic)
  - Mondzish
  - Core Lolo-Burmese
    - Burmish (Burmic)
    - Loloish (Nisoic, Ngwi)

Lama (2012) recognizes 9 unambiguous coherent groups of Lolo-Burmese languages, whereas Bradley considers there to be 5 groups (Burmish, Southern Ngwi, Northern Ngwi, Southeastern Ngwi, and Central Ngwi).

1. Mondzish
2. Burmish
3. Hanoish
4. Lahoish
5. Naxish
6. Nusoish
7. Kazhuoish
8. Lisoish
9. Nisoish

== See also ==
- Proto-Loloish language

== Bibliography ==
- Bradley, David (1997). "Tibeto-Burman languages and classification" (PDF). Tibeto-Burman languages of the Himalayas, Papers in South East Asian linguistics. Canberra: Pacific Linguistics. pp. 1–71.
- Bradley, David (2012). "The Characteristics of the Burmic Family of Tibeto-Burman" (PDF). Language and Linguistics. 13 (1): 171–192. Archived from the original on 2013-07-28.
- van Driem, George (2001). Languages of the Himalayas: An Ethnolinguistic Handbook of the Greater Himalayan Region. Brill. ISBN 978-90-04-12062-4.
- Huang, Bufan [黄布凡], ed. (1992). A Tibeto-Burman Lexicon (TBL) [藏缅语族语言词汇]. Beijing: Minzu University Press [中央民族学院出版社].
- Lama, Ziwo Qiu-Fuyuan (2012). Subgrouping of Nisoic (Yi) Languages (PhD thesis). University of Texas at Arlington. hdl:10106/11161.
- Satterthwaite-Phillips, Damian. 2011. Phylogenetic inference of the Tibeto-Burman languages or On the usefulness of lexicostatistics (and "Megalo"-comparison) for the subgrouping of Tibeto-Burman. Ph.D. dissertation, Stanford University.
- Thurgood, Graham (1974). "Lolo–Burmese rhymes". Linguistics of the Tibeto-Burman Area. 1 (1): 98–107. doi:10.15144/LTBA-1.1.98.
- Yunnan Province Geography Gazetteer Committee [云南省地方志编纂委员会] (1998). Yunnan Province Gazetteer, volume 59: ethnic minority languages and orthographies gazetteer [云南省志卷59: 少数民族语言文字志]. Kunming: Yunnan People's Press [云南人民出版社].
- Zangmian yuyin he cihui (ZMYYC) [藏缅语语音和词汇] (1991). Beijing: Social Sciences Press [中国社会科学出版社].
