= List of administrative divisions of Guizhou =

Guizhou Province
- Province
- Capital: Guiyang

Prefecture-level divisions
- Prefectural cities: 6
- Autonomous prefectures: 3

County level divisions
- County cities: 9
- Counties: 51
- Autonomous counties: 11
- Districts: 16
- Special districts: 1

Township level divisions
- Towns: 691
- Townships: 506
- Ethnic townships: 252
- Subdistricts: 94

Villages level divisions
- Communities: 3,857
- Administrative villages: 14,311

Guizhou, a province of the People's Republic of China, is made up of the following administrative divisions.

== Administrative divisions ==
These administrative divisions are explained in greater detail at administrative divisions of China. The following table lists only the prefecture-level and county-level divisions of Guizhou.

Prefecture level (Division code)	County Level				
Prefecture level (Division code)	Name	Chinese	Hanyu Pinyin	Division code	
Guiyang City 贵阳市; Guìyáng Shì (Capital) (5201 / KWE)	Nanming District	南明区	Nánmíng Qū	520102	NMQ
Guiyang City 贵阳市; Guìyáng Shì (Capital) (5201 / KWE)	Yunyan District	云岩区	Yúnyán Qū	520103	YYQ
Guiyang City 贵阳市; Guìyáng Shì (Capital) (5201 / KWE)	Huaxi District	花溪区	Huāxī Qū	520111	HXI
Guiyang City 贵阳市; Guìyáng Shì (Capital) (5201 / KWE)	Wudang District	乌当区	Wūdāng Qū	520112	WDQ
Guiyang City 贵阳市; Guìyáng Shì (Capital) (5201 / KWE)	Baiyun District	白云区	Báiyún Qū	520113	BYU
Guiyang City 贵阳市; Guìyáng Shì (Capital) (5201 / KWE)	Guanshanhu District	观山湖区	Guānshānhú Qū	520115	GSH
Guiyang City 贵阳市; Guìyáng Shì (Capital) (5201 / KWE)	Kaiyang County	开阳县	Kāiyáng Xiàn	520121	KYG
Guiyang City 贵阳市; Guìyáng Shì (Capital) (5201 / KWE)	Xifeng County	息烽县	Xīfēng Xiàn	520122	XFX
Guiyang City 贵阳市; Guìyáng Shì (Capital) (5201 / KWE)	Xiuwen County	修文县	Xiūwén Xiàn	520123	XWX
Guiyang City 贵阳市; Guìyáng Shì (Capital) (5201 / KWE)	Qingzhen City	清镇市	Qīngzhèn Shì	520181	QZN
Liupanshui City 六盘水市; Liùpánshuǐ Shì (5202 / LPS)	Zhongshan District	钟山区	Zhōngshān Qū	520201	ZSQ
Liupanshui City 六盘水市; Liùpánshuǐ Shì (5202 / LPS)	Liuzhi Special District	六枝特区	Liùzhī Tèqū	520203	LZT
Liupanshui City 六盘水市; Liùpánshuǐ Shì (5202 / LPS)	Shuicheng District	水城区	Shuǐchéng Qū	520205	
Liupanshui City 六盘水市; Liùpánshuǐ Shì (5202 / LPS)	Panzhou City	盘州市	Pánzhōu Shì	520281	PZU
Zunyi City 遵义市; Zūnyì Shì (5203 / ZNY)	Honghuagang District	红花岗区	Hónghuāgǎng Qū	520302	HHG
Zunyi City 遵义市; Zūnyì Shì (5203 / ZNY)	Huichuan District	汇川区	Huìchuān Qū	520303	HHQ
Zunyi City 遵义市; Zūnyì Shì (5203 / ZNY)	Bozhou District	播州区	Bōzhōu Qū	520304	BZG
Zunyi City 遵义市; Zūnyì Shì (5203 / ZNY)	Tongzi County	桐梓县	Tóngzǐ Xiàn	520322	TZI
Zunyi City 遵义市; Zūnyì Shì (5203 / ZNY)	Suiyang County	绥阳县	Suíyáng Xiàn	520323	SUY
Zunyi City 遵义市; Zūnyì Shì (5203 / ZNY)	Zheng'an County	正安县	Zhèng'ān Xiàn	520324	ZAX
Zunyi City 遵义市; Zūnyì Shì (5203 / ZNY)	Daozhen County (Note: Conventional name: Daozhen Gelao and Miao Autonomous County; Chinese: 道真仡佬族苗族自治县; pinyin: Dàozhēn Gēlǎozú Miáozú Zìzhìxiàn)	道真县	Dàozhēn Xiàn	520325	DZN
Zunyi City 遵义市; Zūnyì Shì (5203 / ZNY)	Wuchuan County (Note: Conventional name: Wuchuan Gelao and Miao Autonomous County; Chinese: 务川仡佬族苗族自治县; pinyin: Wùchuān Gēlǎozú Miáozú Zìzhìxiàn)	务川县	Wùchuān Xiàn	520326	WCU
Zunyi City 遵义市; Zūnyì Shì (5203 / ZNY)	Fenggang County	凤冈县	Fènggāng Xiàn	520327	FGG
Zunyi City 遵义市; Zūnyì Shì (5203 / ZNY)	Meitan County	湄潭县	Méitán Xiàn	520328	MTN
Zunyi City 遵义市; Zūnyì Shì (5203 / ZNY)	Yuqing County	余庆县	Yúqìng Xiàn	520329	YUQ
Zunyi City 遵义市; Zūnyì Shì (5203 / ZNY)	Xishui County	习水县	Xíshuǐ Xiàn	520330	XSI
Zunyi City 遵义市; Zūnyì Shì (5203 / ZNY)	Chishui City	赤水市	Chìshuǐ Shì	520381	CSS
Zunyi City 遵义市; Zūnyì Shì (5203 / ZNY)	Renhuai City	仁怀市	Rénhuái Shì	520382	RHS
Anshun City 安顺市; Ānshùn Shì (5204 / ASS)	Xixiu District	西秀区	Xīxiù Qū	520402	XXU
Anshun City 安顺市; Ānshùn Shì (5204 / ASS)	Pingba District	平坝区	Píngbà Qū	520403	PIB
Anshun City 安顺市; Ānshùn Shì (5204 / ASS)	Puding County	普定县	Pǔdìng Xiàn	520422	PUD
Anshun City 安顺市; Ānshùn Shì (5204 / ASS)	Zhenning County (Note: Conventional name: Zhenning Buyei and Miao Autonomous County; Chinese: 镇宁布依族苗族自治县; pinyin: Zhènníng Bùyīzú Miáozú Zìzhìxiàn)	镇宁县	Zhènníng Xiàn	520423	ZNN
Anshun City 安顺市; Ānshùn Shì (5204 / ASS)	Guanling County (Note: Conventional name: Guanling Buyei and Miao Autonomous County; Chinese: 关岭布依族苗族自治县; pinyin: Guānlǐng Bùyīzú Miáozú Zìzhìxiàn)	关岭县	Guānlǐng Xiàn	520424	GNL
Anshun City 安顺市; Ānshùn Shì (5204 / ASS)	Ziyun County (Note: Conventional name: Ziyun Miao and Buyei Autonomous County; Chinese: 紫云苗族布依族自治县; pinyin: Zǐyún Miáozú Bùyīzú Zìzhìxiàn)	紫云县	Zǐyún Xiàn	520425	ZYF
Bijie City 毕节市; Bìjié Shì (5205 / BJS)	Qixingguan District	七星关区	Qīxīngguān Qū	520502	QXD
Bijie City 毕节市; Bìjié Shì (5205 / BJS)	Dafang County	大方县	Dàfāng Xiàn	520521	DAF
Bijie City 毕节市; Bìjié Shì (5205 / BJS)	Jinsha County	金沙县	Jīnshā Xiàn	520523	JSX
Bijie City 毕节市; Bìjié Shì (5205 / BJS)	Zhijin County	织金县	Zhījīn Xiàn	520524	ZJN
Bijie City 毕节市; Bìjié Shì (5205 / BJS)	Nayong County	纳雍县	Nàyōng Xiàn	520525	NYG
Bijie City 毕节市; Bìjié Shì (5205 / BJS)	Weining County (Note: Conventional name: Weining Yi Hui and Miao Autonomous County; Chinese: 威宁彝族回族苗族自治县; pinyin: Wēiníng Yízú Huízú Miáozú Zìzhìxiàn)	威宁县	Wēiníng Xiàn	520526	WNG
Bijie City 毕节市; Bìjié Shì (5205 / BJS)	Hezhang County	赫章县	Hèzhāng Xiàn	520527	HZA
Bijie City 毕节市; Bìjié Shì (5205 / BJS)	Qianxi City	黔西市	Qiánxī Shì	520581	QNX
Tongren City 铜仁市; Tóngrén Shì (5206 / TRG)	Bijiang District	碧江区	Bìjiāng Qū	520602	BJN
Tongren City 铜仁市; Tóngrén Shì (5206 / TRG)	Wanshan District	万山区	Wànshān Qū	520603	WSW
Tongren City 铜仁市; Tóngrén Shì (5206 / TRG)	Jiangkou County	江口县	Jiāngkǒu Xiàn	520621	JGK
Tongren City 铜仁市; Tóngrén Shì (5206 / TRG)	Yuping County (Note: Conventional name: Yuping Dong Autonomous County; Chinese: 玉屏侗族自治县; pinyin: Yùpíng Dòngzú Zìzhìxiàn)	玉屏县	Yùpíng Xiàn	520622	YPG
Tongren City 铜仁市; Tóngrén Shì (5206 / TRG)	Shiqian County	石阡县	Shíqiān Xiàn	520623	SQI
Tongren City 铜仁市; Tóngrén Shì (5206 / TRG)	Sinan County	思南县	Sīnán Xiàn	520624	SNA
Tongren City 铜仁市; Tóngrén Shì (5206 / TRG)	Yinjiang County (Note: Conventional name: Yinjiang Tujia and Miao Autonomous County; Chinese: 印江土家族苗族自治县; pinyin: Yìnjiāng Tǔjiāzú Miáozú Zìzhìxiàn)	印江县	Yìnjiāng Xiàn	520625	YJY
Tongren City 铜仁市; Tóngrén Shì (5206 / TRG)	Dejiang County	德江县	Déjiāng Xiàn	520626	DEJ
Tongren City 铜仁市; Tóngrén Shì (5206 / TRG)	Yanhe County (Note: Conventional name: Yanhe Tujia Autonomous County; Chinese: 沿河土家族自治县; pinyin: Yánhé Tǔjiāzú Zìzhìxiàn)	沿河县	Yánhé Xiàn	520627	YHE
Tongren City 铜仁市; Tóngrén Shì (5206 / TRG)	Songtao County (Note: Conventional name: Songtao Miao Autonomous County; Chinese: 松桃苗族自治县; pinyin: Sōngtáo Miáozú Zìzhìxiàn)	松桃县	Sōngtáo Xiàn	520628	STM
Qianxinan Prefecture (Note: Conventional name: Qianxinan Buyei and Miao Autonomous Prefecture; Chinese: 黔西南布依族苗族自治州; pinyin: Qiánxīnán Bùyīzú Miáozú Zìzhìzhōu) 黔西南州; Qiánxīnán Zhōu (5223 / QXZ)	Xingyi City	兴义市	Xīngyì Shì	522301	XYI
Qianxinan Prefecture 黔西南州; Qiánxīnán Zhōu (5223 / QXZ)	Xingren City	兴仁市	Xīngrén Xiàn	522302	
Qianxinan Prefecture 黔西南州; Qiánxīnán Zhōu (5223 / QXZ)	Pu'an County	普安县	Pǔ'ān Xiàn	522323	PUA
Qianxinan Prefecture 黔西南州; Qiánxīnán Zhōu (5223 / QXZ)	Qinglong County	晴隆县	Qínglóng Xiàn	522324	QLG
Qianxinan Prefecture 黔西南州; Qiánxīnán Zhōu (5223 / QXZ)	Zhenfeng County	贞丰县	Zhēnfēng Xiàn	522325	ZFG
Qianxinan Prefecture 黔西南州; Qiánxīnán Zhōu (5223 / QXZ)	Wangmo County	望谟县	Wàngmó Xiàn	522326	WMO
Qianxinan Prefecture 黔西南州; Qiánxīnán Zhōu (5223 / QXZ)	Ceheng County	册亨县	Cèhēng Xiàn	522327	CEH
Qianxinan Prefecture 黔西南州; Qiánxīnán Zhōu (5223 / QXZ)	Anlong County	安龙县	Ānlóng Xiàn	522328	ALG
Qiandongnan Prefecture (Note: Conventional name: Qiandongnan Miao and Dong Autonomous Prefecture; Chinese: 黔东南苗族侗族自治州; pinyin: Qiándōngnán Miáozú Dòngzú Zìzhìzhōu) 黔东南州; Qiándōngnán Zhōu (5226 / QDN)	Kaili City	凯里市	Kǎilǐ Shì	522601	KLS
Qiandongnan Prefecture 黔东南州; Qiándōngnán Zhōu (5226 / QDN)	Huangping County	黄平县	Huángpíng Xiàn	522622	HPN
Qiandongnan Prefecture 黔东南州; Qiándōngnán Zhōu (5226 / QDN)	Shibing County	施秉县	Shībǐng Xiàn	522623	SBG
Qiandongnan Prefecture 黔东南州; Qiándōngnán Zhōu (5226 / QDN)	Sansui County	三穗县	Sānsuì Xiàn	522624	SAS
Qiandongnan Prefecture 黔东南州; Qiándōngnán Zhōu (5226 / QDN)	Zhenyuan County	镇远县	Zhènyuǎn Xiàn	522625	ZYX
Qiandongnan Prefecture 黔东南州; Qiándōngnán Zhōu (5226 / QDN)	Cengong County	岑巩县	Céngǒng Xiàn	522626	CGX
Qiandongnan Prefecture 黔东南州; Qiándōngnán Zhōu (5226 / QDN)	Tianzhu County	天柱县	Tiānzhù Xiàn	522627	TZU
Qiandongnan Prefecture 黔东南州; Qiándōngnán Zhōu (5226 / QDN)	Jinping County	锦屏县	Jǐnpíng Xiàn	522628	JPX
Qiandongnan Prefecture 黔东南州; Qiándōngnán Zhōu (5226 / QDN)	Jianhe County	剑河县	Jiànhé Xiàn	522629	JHE
Qiandongnan Prefecture 黔东南州; Qiándōngnán Zhōu (5226 / QDN)	Taijiang County	台江县	Táijiāng Xiàn	522630	TJX
Qiandongnan Prefecture 黔东南州; Qiándōngnán Zhōu (5226 / QDN)	Liping County	黎平县	Lípíng Xiàn	522631	LIP
Qiandongnan Prefecture 黔东南州; Qiándōngnán Zhōu (5226 / QDN)	Rongjiang County	榕江县	Róngjiāng Xiàn	522632	RJG
Qiandongnan Prefecture 黔东南州; Qiándōngnán Zhōu (5226 / QDN)	Congjiang County	从江县	Cóngjiāng Xiàn	522633	COJ
Qiandongnan Prefecture 黔东南州; Qiándōngnán Zhōu (5226 / QDN)	Leishan County	雷山县	Léishān Xiàn	522634	LSA
Qiandongnan Prefecture 黔东南州; Qiándōngnán Zhōu (5226 / QDN)	Majiang County	麻江县	Májiāng Xiàn	522635	MAJ
Qiandongnan Prefecture 黔东南州; Qiándōngnán Zhōu (5226 / QDN)	Danzhai County	丹寨县	Dānzhài Xiàn	522636	DZH
Qiannan Prefecture (Note: Conventional name: Qiannan Buyei and Miao Autonomous Prefecture; Chinese: 黔南布依族苗族自治州; pinyin: Qiánnán Bùyīzú Miáozú Zìzhìzhōu) 黔南州; Qiánnán Zhōu (5227 / QNZ)	Duyun City	都匀市	Dūyún Shì	522701	DUY
Qiannan Prefecture 黔南州; Qiánnán Zhōu (5227 / QNZ)	Fuquan City	福泉市	Fúquán Shì	522702	FQN
Qiannan Prefecture 黔南州; Qiánnán Zhōu (5227 / QNZ)	Libo County	荔波县	Lìbō Xiàn	522722	LBO
Qiannan Prefecture 黔南州; Qiánnán Zhōu (5227 / QNZ)	Guiding County	贵定县	Guìdìng Xiàn	522723	GDG
Qiannan Prefecture 黔南州; Qiánnán Zhōu (5227 / QNZ)	Weng'an County	瓮安县	Wèng'ān Xiàn	522725	WGA
Qiannan Prefecture 黔南州; Qiánnán Zhōu (5227 / QNZ)	Dushan County	独山县	Dúshān Xiàn	522726	DSX
Qiannan Prefecture 黔南州; Qiánnán Zhōu (5227 / QNZ)	Pingtang County	平塘县	Píngtáng Xiàn	522727	PTG
Qiannan Prefecture 黔南州; Qiánnán Zhōu (5227 / QNZ)	Luodian County	罗甸县	Luódiàn Xiàn	522728	LOD
Qiannan Prefecture 黔南州; Qiánnán Zhōu (5227 / QNZ)	Changshun County	长顺县	Chángshùn Xiàn	522729	CSU
Qiannan Prefecture 黔南州; Qiánnán Zhōu (5227 / QNZ)	Longli County	龙里县	Lónglǐ Xiàn	522730	LLI
Qiannan Prefecture 黔南州; Qiánnán Zhōu (5227 / QNZ)	Huishui County	惠水县	Huìshuǐ Xiàn	522731	HUS
Qiannan Prefecture 黔南州; Qiánnán Zhōu (5227 / QNZ)	Sandu County (Note: Conventional name: Sandu Shui Autonomous County; Chinese: 三都水族自治县; pinyin: Sāndū Shuǐzú Zìzhìxiàn)	三都县	Sāndū Xiàn	522732	SDU

== Recent changes in administrative divisions ==
Date	Before	After	Note	Reference
1980-01-03	Wanshan County	Wanshan Special District	reorganized	
1980-03-27	Guanling County	Guanling County (Aut.)	reorganized	
1980-05-01	Xingyi Prefecture	Qianxinan Prefecture (Aut.)	renamed & reorganized	
1980-09-21	Zhenfeng County (Aut.)	Zhenfeng County	reorganized	
1980-09-21	Wangmo County (Aut.)	Wangmo County	reorganized	
1980-09-21	Ceheng County (Aut.)	Ceheng County	reorganized	
1980-09-21	Anlong County (Aut.)	Anlong County	reorganized	
1983-01-18	all Province-controlled city (P-City) → Prefecture-level city (PL-City)			Civil Affairs Announcement
1983-01-18	all Prefecture-controlled city (PC-City) → County-level city (CL-City)			Civil Affairs Announcement
1983-08-19	Kaili County	Kaili (CL-City)	reorganized	
1983-08-19	Duyun County	Duyun (CL-City)	merged into	
1983-09-07	Yuping County	Yuping County (Aut.)	reorganized	
1986-08-21	Wuchuan County	Wuchuan County (Aut.)	reorganized	
1986-09-09	Daozhen County	Daozhen County (Aut.)	reorganized	
1986-10-07	Yanhe County	Yanhe County (Aut.)	reorganized	
1986-12-13	Yinjiang County	Yinjiang County (Aut.)	reorganized	
1987-08-21	Tongren County	Tongren (CL-City)	reorganized	
1987-11-06	Xingyi County	Xingyi County (CL-City)	reorganized	
1987-12-15	Shuicheng Special District	Zhongshan District, Liupanshui	established	
1987-12-15	Shuicheng Special District	Shuicheng County	reorganized	
1990-02-03	Anshun County	Anshun (CL-City)	merged	
1990-09-30	Chishui County	Chishui (CL-City)	reorganized	
1992-11-06	Qingzhen County	Qingzhen (CL-City)	reorganized	Civil Affairs [1992]131
1993-12-10	Bijie County	Bijie (CL-City)	reorganized	Civil Affairs [1993]242
1995-07-21	parts of Anshun Prefecture	Guiyang (PL-City)	transferred	State Council [1995]69
1995-07-21	↳ Kaiyang County	↳ Kaiyang County	transferred	State Council [1995]69
1995-07-21	↳ Xifeng County	↳ Xifeng County	transferred	State Council [1995]69
1995-07-21	↳ Xiuwen County	↳ Xiuwen County	transferred	State Council [1995]69
1995-11-30	Renhuai County	Renhuai (CL-City)	reorganized	Civil Affairs [1995]79
1996-12-02	Fuquan County	Fuquan (CL-City)	reorganized	Civil Affairs [1996]88
1997-06-10	Zunyi Prefecture	Zunyi (PL-City)	reorganized	State Council [1997]45
1997-06-10	Zunyi (CL-City)	Honghuagang District	reorganized	State Council [1997]45
1999-02-28	Panxian Special District	Pan County	reorganized	Civil Affairs [1999]16
2000-01-21	parts of Baiyun District	Xiaohe District	established	State Council [2000]10
2000-06-23	Anshun Prefecture	Anshun (PL-City)	reorganized	State Council [2000]79
2000-06-23	Anshun (CL-City)	Xixiu District	reorganized	State Council [2000]79
2003-12-26	parts of Honghuagang District	Huichuan District	established	State Council [2003]135
2011-10-22	Bijie Prefecture	Bijie (PL-City)	reorganized	State Council [2011]130
2011-10-22	Bijie (CL-City)	Qixingguan District	reorganized	State Council [2011]130
2011-10-22	Tongren Prefecture	Tongren (PL-City)	reorganized	State Council [2011]131
2011-10-22	Tongren (CL-City)	Bijiang District	reorganized	State Council [2011]131
2011-10-22	Wanshan Special District	Wanshan District	reorganized	State Council [2011]131
2012-11-15	Xiaohe District	Huaxi District	merged into	State Council [2012]190
2012-11-15	parts of Baiyun District	Guanshanhu District	established	State Council [2012]190
2014-12-13	Pingba County	Pingba District	reorganized	State Council [2014]160
2016-03-20	Zunyi County	Bozhou District	reorganized	State Council [2016]56
2017-04-09	Pan County	Panzhou (CL-City)	reorganized	Civil Affairs [2017]74
2018-07-02	Xingren County	Xingren (CL-City)	reorganized	Civil Affairs [2018]107
2020-07-??	Shuicheng County	Shuicheng District	reorganized	

== Population composition ==
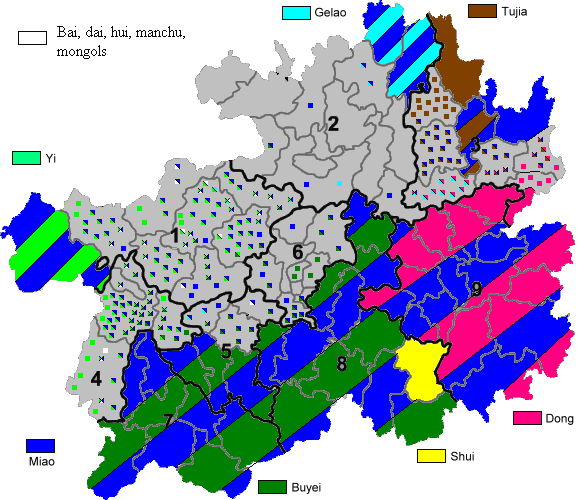
Major Autonomous areas within Guizhou. (excluding Hui)

=== Prefectures ===
Prefecture	2010	2000
Bijie	6,536,370	6,327,471
Zunyi	6,127,009	6,543,860
Tongren	3,092,365	
Liupanshui	2,851,180	2,744,085
Anshun	2,297,339	2,331,741
Guiyang	4,324,561	3,718,449
Qianxinan	2,805,857	2,864,920
Qiannan	3,231,161	3,569,847
Qiandongnan	3,480,626	3,844,697

=== Counties ===
Name	Prefecture	2010
Nanming	Guiyang	829,948
Yunyan	Guiyang	957,535
Huaxi	Guiyang	608,213
Wudang	Guiyang	376,920
Baiyun	Guiyang	264,543
Jinyang → Guanshanhu	Guiyang	180,000
Kaiyang	Guiyang	358,130
Xifeng	Guiyang	212,879
Xiuwen	Guiyang	248,955
Qingzhen	Guiyang	467,438
Zhongshan	Liupanshui	616,774
Liuzhi	Liupanshui	495,008
Pan(xian)	Liupanshui	1,034,903
Shuicheng	Liupanshui	704,495
Honghuagang	Zunyi	656,725
Huichuan	Zunyi	438,464
Bozhou	Zunyi	944,326
Tongzi	Zunyi	521,567
Suiyang	Zunyi	379,938
Zheng'an	Zunyi	389,434
Daozhen	Zunyi	244,123
Fenggang	Zunyi	313,005
Meitan	Zunyi	377,354
Yuqing	Zunyi	234,681
Xishui	Zunyi	522,541
Wuchuan	Zunyi	321,581
Chishui	Zunyi	237,029
Renhuai	Zunyi	546,241
Xixiu	Anshun	765,313
Pingba	Anshun	298,034
Puding	Anshun	378,288
Zhenning	Anshun	283,880
Guanling	Anshun	301,562
Ziyun	Anshun	270,262
Tongren → Bijiang	Tongren	361,864
Wanshan	Tongren	47,844
Jiangkou	Tongren	172,753
Shiqian	Tongren	304,218
Sinan	Tongren	499,398
Dejiang	Tongren	367,908
Yuping	Tongren	118,398
Yinjiang	Tongren	284,110
Yanhe	Tongren	449,361
Songtao	Tongren	486,511
Bijie → Qixingguan	Bijie	1,136,905
Dafang	Bijie	776,246
Qianxi	Bijie	695,735
Jinsha	Bijie	560,651
Zhijin	Bijie	783,951
Nayong	Bijie	669,781
Hezhang	Bijie	1,263,816
Weining	Bijie	649,285
Xingyi	Qianxinan	784,032
Xingren	Qianxinan	417,829
Pu'an	Qianxinan	254,328
Qinglong	Qianxinan	246,594
Zhenfeng	Qianxinan	303,762
Wangmo	Qianxinan	251,629
Ceheng	Qianxinan	190,379
Anlong	Qianxinan	357,304
Kaili	Qiandongnan	478642
Huangping	Qiandongnan	263,123
Shibing	Qiandongnan	130,490
Sansui	Qiandongnan	155,671
Zhenyuan	Qiandongnan	203,735
Cengong	Qiandongnan	162,008
Tianzhu	Qiandongnan	263,841
Jinping	Qiandongnan	154,841
Jianhe	Qiandongnan	180,544
Taijiang	Qiandongnan	112,236
Liping	Qiandongnan	391,110
Rongjiang	Qiandongnan	286,336
Congjiang	Qiandongnan	290,845
Leishan	Qiandongnan	117,198
Majiang	Qiandongnan	167,596
Danzhai	Qiandongnan	122,410
Duyun	Qiannan	443,937
Fuquan	Qiannan	283,943
Libo	Qiannan	144,849
Guiding	Qiannan	231,015
Weng'an	Qiannan	380,458
Dushan	Qiannan	265,083
Pingtang	Qiannan	228,377
Luodian	Qiannan	256,488
Changshun	Qiannan	190,931
Longli	Qiannan	180,683
Huishui	Qiannan	342,294
Sandu	Qiannan	283,103
