= Gejia people =

Ethnic group of Guizhou province, China

The Gejia (Chinese: 𱎼家人 or 革家人; Hanyu pinyin: Géjiārén; also Gedou) is an ethnic group of Guizhou province, southwestern China. They are officially classified by the government as a part of the Miao. They hold a special status in Guizhou, though they are not recognized as a distinct group separate from the Miao. The Gejia live mainly in Qiandongnan Prefecture, in the counties of Huangping, Kaili, and Guanling. They are concentrated in the towns of Chong'an, Chong Xing, Huangpiao in Huangping and Longchang, Wanshui of Kaili. Matang is exclusively inhabited by these people. There are over 400 inhabitants in this village. The total Gejia population is approximately 50,000.

== History ==
The Gejia, according to legend, are the direct descendants of Houyi, a legendary hero who was said to have shot the nine scorching suns in order to salvage his people. They are noted for their war-like nature and their costumes are indications of such warfare passion. In 1953, the Chinese government initiated classification of the ethnic minorities. Anthropologists were assigned to distinguish China's ethnic groups based on social history, economic life, language and religion. Out of the 400 groups investigated, China officially approved 38 as distinct ethnicities in 1954. Although the official report of the original investigation recommended that they be identified as a separate minority group, the Gejia were excluded from final approval. They are officially recognised as a sub-group of the Miao people. (The number of recognised ethnic minorities in China has risen to 56 since 1954.)

== Culture ==
The major occupation among the Gejia people is farming. They practice slash-and-burn methods of cultivation, with rice, corn, and millet being their major crops. The women are typically focused on embroideries and batik. Their handicraft style dates back to the Qin dynasty (221–207 BCE), the first dynasty of a unified China and the group sells the items to visitors. The people are most noted for their batik products. Girls are taught the technique at a young age.

The dress code of the women has a cultural symbol, particularly signifying the warfare of their ancestors. The head dress is a representation of the Sun and the arrow, while the shoulders and back are covered with thick wools like shawls that represent shields. They cover their legs with leggings as leg guards and the clothes are made in white and red patterns, and decorated with silver ornaments. They practice animism, and make offerings to appease invisible spirits to prevent diseases, calamities and death, and to make a good harvest.

A major festival among the Gejia is Caiqing. It involves a dance called Caiqing Wu (Wu for "dance"), which is a dance of romance. It is held in the first lunar month. Gejia women wear colorful festival dresses, including batik scarves, silver necklaces, pleated skirts, aprons and leggings. There is also a lusheng festival (similar to that of Miao) held in November where the boys play a series of bamboo pipes called lusheng. They perform bird fight and antiphonal singing.

== Ethnic identity ==
In spite of their unique customs, religious practices, and dialect variation, scholars generally classify the Gejia as a sub-group of the Miao. However, the Gejia object to this assertion and claim that they are a unique minority group. Based on their similarities in lifestyle, language, and costumes, the government of China officially categorizes them as Miao. Fundamentally, their dialect is one of the Miao languages, however, there are subtle differences. For example, Miao people cannot understand every word of Gejia speech. Their insistent demand of reclassification as separate ethnicity has been to no avail. This is apparently because they are largely outnumbered by the main Miao people. They are also sometimes misidentified as Ge people, who live in the southeastern region of Guizhou.

=== Anthropological study ===
A study in 2014 by researchers at the Huazhong Normal University indicated that the linguistic root of the Gejia is the same as that of the Miao. They analyzed five tongue movement types, including rolling, folding, twisting, pointed tongue, and clover-leaf tongue. They concluded that there are no significant differences in these linguistic properties between the Miao and Gejia.

== See also ==
- Unrecognized ethnic groups in China
