= Lei Yan =

Chinese female singer of Miao ethnicity

- 雷艳
- Born: October 1980 (age 44); Shibing County, Qiandongnan Miao and Dong Autonomous Prefecture, Guizhou, China
- Occupation(s): Singer, politician
- Years active: 2003-2019

Lei Yan (Chinese: 雷艳; born October 1980) is a Chinese singer of Miao ethnicity.

== Early life ==
Lei was born in 1980 in Shibing County in Guizhou. In the summer of 1998, she was admitted to the Music Performance Department of the School of Arts of Guizhou University. In 2002, following her graduation, she wanted to stay on campus to work as teacher, but in the end, she went to work in a song and dance troupe in Qiandongnan Prefecture.

== Musical career ==
In 2003, she won the second prize in the Guizhou Newcomer and New Song TV Contest with the song Roxbirica, marking the start of her singing career. That same year, Lei formed the "Roxbirica Group" with two other ethnic female singers. In 2006, she took on a leading role in the song and dance performance Colorful Guizhou Style, touring over 30 provinces and cities across China as well as internationally.

In April 2011, she was shortlisted for the Singing China - The Most Popular New Songs competition with her lyrical song The Taste of Hometown. Over the following years, she continued to build her discography with several singles: Zigui Guides, Clouds and Water Elegantly in May 2014, My Chinese Dream in September 2014, The Road Home Is Connected in December 2014, The Taste of Hometown in June 2015, and Miao Family in the World in October 2015. In July 2016, she dedicated her song Love Blossoms to Taijiang County in Guizhou.

Her album Beautiful Nostalgia followed in February 2017, with more singles like Clouds and Water Elegantly in August 2017, The Most Beautiful Waiting in November 2017, and Where Does the Song Come From? in January 2018.

On 12 January 2018, Lei's pop single Where Does the Song Come From?, became the theme song at the opening ceremony of the 7th Tourism Industry Development Conference of Qiandongnan Prefecture.

== Political career ==
In February 2007, Lei was elected as a member of the Standing Committee of the 10th Chinese People's Political Consultative Conference of Qiandongnan Prefecture. In 2013, she was elected as delegate of Guizhou at the 12th National People's Congress and in 2015, she was elected as a delegate to the Ninth National Congress of Literature and Art. During her tenure as delegate to the National People's Congress, she oversaw initiatives for the preservation of Miao cultural heritage in China.

In 2018, Lei was elected as delegate again for Guizhou at the 13th National People's Congress.

On 27 September 2019, according to Chinese state-run media, at the 12th session of the Standing Committee of the 13th Guizhou Provincial People's Congress and during its third plenary meeting, Lei was found to have violated provisions related to the Law of the People's Republic of China on Deputies to the National People's Congress and Local People's Congresses at All Levels, and as a result was ordered to submit her resignation as a deputy to the 13th National People's Congress and her resignation was accepted. On 26 October 2019, the Credentials Committee of the Standing Committee of the 13th National People's Congress submitted a report on the qualifications of certain deputies and in it, Lei was accused of disciplinary violations and was ordered to resign from her position as a deputy to the 13th National People's Congress, and her qualifications as deputy terminated. Reports do not clarify what was Lei's violations or provide specific details regarding the nature of her alleged disciplinary infractions, leaving the reasons undisclosed to the public.

== Discography ==
- Where Does the Song Come From? (Chinese: 歌从哪里来; pinyin: Gē cóng nǎlǐ lái) (2018)
- The Most Beautiful Wait (Chinese: 最美的等待; pinyin: Zuìměi de děngdài) (2017)
- Clouds and Water Elegantly (Chinese: 云水依依; pinyin: Yún shuǐ yīyī) (2017)
- Beautiful Nostalgia (Chinese: 美丽的乡愁; pinyin: Měilì de xiāngchóuī) (2017)
- Valley Appointment (Chinese: 山谷之约; pinyin: Shāngǔ zhī yuē) (2016)
- Five Hundred Miles from Home (Chinese: 离家五百里; pinyin: Lí jiā wǔbǎi lǐ) (2016)
- Miao Family in the World (Chinese: 天下苗家; pinyin: Tiānxià miáo jiā) (2015)
- The Taste of Life (Chinese: 人生味; pinyin: Rénshēng wèi) (2015)
- The Flavor of Home (Chinese: 家乡的味道; pinyin: Jiāxiāng de wèidào) (2014)
- The Road Home Is Connected (Chinese: 回家的路相连; pinyin: Huí jiā de lù xiānglián) (2014)
- My Chinese Dream (Chinese: 一城山水人兴隆; pinyin: Yī chéng shānshuǐ rén xīnglóng) (2014)
- Zigui Guides, Clouds and Water Elegantly (Chinese: 子归引云水依依; pinyin: Zǐ guī yǐn yún shuǐ yīyī) (2014)

== Filmography ==
- Fēi gē de xiàtiān (2010)
