= 2020 in Kunlun Fight =

Information
- First date: TBA

The year 2020 was the 7th year in the history of the Kunlun Fight, a kickboxing promotion based in China. The events in 2020 suffered multiple cancellations and postponements due to the COVID-19 pandemic.

The events were broadcasts through television agreements in mainland China with Jiangsu TV and around the world with various other channels. The events were also streamed live on Xigua Video. Traditionally, most Kunlun Fight events have both tournament fights and superfights (single fights).

== List of events ==
Scheduled events

#	Event	Date	Venue	Location
4	Kunlun Combat Professional League - Wuhan vs. Hefei	August 11, 2020	Kunlun Fight Stadium	Tongling, Anhui, China
3	Kunlun Combat Professional League - Dengfeng vs. Shenyang	August 11, 2020	Kunlun Fight Stadium	Tongling, Anhui, China

Kunlun Combat Professional League

#	Event	Date	Venue	Location
2	Kunlun Combat Professional League - Zhengdu vs. Kunshan	August 10, 2020	Kunlun Fight Stadium	Tongling, Anhui, China
1	Kunlun Combat Professional League - Zhengzhou vs. Taicang	August 10, 2020	Kunlun Fight Stadium	Tongling, Anhui, China

Kunlun Fight City Hero

#	Event	Date	Venue	Location
6	Kunlun Fight City Hero 248	August 17, 2020	Danzhai Wanda Village	Danzhai County, Guizhou, China
5	Kunlun Fight City Hero 247	August 17, 2020	Danzhai Wanda Village	Danzhai County, Guizhou, China
4	Kunlun Fight City Hero 246	August 17, 2020		Shenzhen, China
3	Kunlun Fight City Hero 245	July 17, 2020	Duan County National Gymnasium	Du'an Yao Autonomous County, Guangxi, China
2	Kunlun Fight City Hero 244	January 18, 2020		Guangxi, China
1	Kunlun Fight City Hero 243	January 1, 2020		Guangxi, China

Cancelled and postponed events

Kunlun Fight 90

Kunlun Fight 90 was scheduled for March, 8 in Wuzhishan City, Hainan, China. The event was cancelled due to the COVID-19 pandemic.

Kunlun Fight 89

Kunlun Fight 89 was set to be held jointly with the AMMA organization on February 23 at the Hatpatong Football Stadium in Patong, Phuket, Thailand, but the Kunlun Fight portion of the event was cancelled due to the 2020 coronavirus pandemic.

2020 Kunlun Combat Professional League and Youth Fighting League seasons

The Kunlun Combat Professional League and Youth Fighting League 2020 seasons were tentatively scheduled to start in March, but the start dates for both were postponed due to the 2020 coronavirus pandemic.

== See also ==
- 2020 in Glory
- 2020 in ONE Championship
- 2020 in K-1
- 2020 in Wu Lin Feng
- 2020 in Romanian kickboxing
