= Kaili Huangping Airport =

Kaili Huangping Airport 凯里黄平机场
- IATA: KJH; ICAO: ZUKJ

Summary
- Airport type: Public
- Serves: Kaili, Guizhou, China
- Location: Huangping County, Qiandongnan
- Opened: 2 October 2013; 13 years ago
- Coordinates: 26°58′27″N 107°58′50″E

Map
- Location of airport in Guizhou

Runways
Direction	Length		Surface
Direction	m	ft	Surface
04/22	2,600	8,530	Concrete

Statistics (2021)
- Passengers: 155,964
- Aircraft movements: 33,617
- Cargo (metric tons): 5.6

Kaili Huangping Airport
- Simplified Chinese: 凯里黄平机场
- Traditional Chinese: 凱裏黃平機場
Transcriptions
Standard Mandarin
- Hanyu Pinyin: Kǎilǐ Huángpíng Jīchǎng
Yue: Cantonese
- Jyutping: Kai3li3 Huang2ping2 Gei1coeng4

Kaili Huangping Airport (IATA: KJH, ICAO: ZUKJ) is an airport serving the city of Kaili, the seat of Qiandongnan Miao and Dong Autonomous Prefecture in Guizhou Province, China. It is located in Huangping County, 12 kilometers northeast of the county seat and 54 kilometers from Kaili. Construction started on 28 December 2010 with a total investment of 870 million yuan. The airport was opened on 2 October 2013.

== Facilities ==
The airport has a runway that is 2,600 meters long and 45 meters wide, and a 3,500-square-meter terminal building. It is projected to handle 200,000 passengers annually by 2020.

== Airlines and destinations ==
Airlines	Destinations
Air Chang'an	Haikou, Xi'an

== See also ==
- List of airports in China
- List of the busiest airports in China
