= Ayouduo =

Chinese singer and actress

- 阿幼朵
- Born: Lei Zhenping; 1980 (age 45–46); Huangping, Guizhou, China
- Education: Beijing Normal University
- Occupations: Singer, actress
- Years active: 1999–present
- Height: 160 cm (5 ft 3 in)

Lei Zhenping (Chinese: 雷珍萍; born 1980), also known by her stage name Ayouduo (Chinese: 阿幼朵), is a Chinese singer and actress of Miao ethnicity. Known as the "Miao Queen of Songs", she is a national first-class performer and served as a deputy to the 11th National People's Congress

== Early life ==
Ayouduo was born in 1980 in Dazhai Village in Gulong Town, Huangping County, Guizhou, and grew up in a Miao family in the Qiandongnan Miao and Dong Autonomous Prefecture. As a child, she was known locally as the "little Miao singer". Her mother, Long Tongzhen, was a singer and a national-level representative inheritor of Miao ancient songs, which were placed on China's first list of national intangible cultural heritage in 2006. The final syllable of her stage name, duo, comes from a sound in a local folk song that her mother sang to lull her to sleep. After her father and two brothers died when she was young, she was raised by her mother alongside her three sisters. At 14, she took part in a local singing competition. In 1993, she performed as a singer and dancer at the Beijing Ethnic Culture Village for a year, before working briefly as a hotel waitress in Kaili and then as a migrant worker in Guangzhou and Shenzhen. She is a graduate of Beijing Normal University.

== Career ==
=== Music ===
Ayouduo rose to prominence in 1999, when she won the gold award at the Guizhou Youth Singer Competition and first place in the Guizhou division of a national folk singer selection held by the State Ethnic Affairs Commission. In January 2005, she became the first singer to perform Guizhou folk songs in the original ecological style at the Golden Hall of the Musikverein in Vienna. That year, she also performed at the CCTV Spring Festival Gala, where she has since sung Miao-style songs several times, and joined the song and dance production Colorful Guizhou.

In 2006, she performed at the opening of the Nanning International Folk Song Festival. In July 2007, she released the album Drunken Miao Land, which drew more than 10,000 visits on its first day online. In 2018, she performed at the Qiandongnan branch venue of the CCTV Spring Festival Gala. In 2020, during the COVID-19 pandemic, she joined the recording of the public-service song "The Weight of Life". In 2024, she released the single "Singing the Dragon Boat Tune Again".

=== Film ===
In 2009, Ayouduo made her film debut in Iron-Blooded Police Soul, playing a policewoman.

=== Public roles ===
Ayouduo served as a deputy to the 11th National People's Congress and was a member of the 10th committee of the All-China Youth Federation. In 2019, she took part in the "Good Deeds Guizhou" charity walk in support of poverty relief, and the Guizhou drug rehabilitation authorities appointed her a publicity ambassador. In 2021, she became a director of the China Literary and Art Volunteers Association, and in 2022, she became a vice chairwoman of the Guizhou Federation of Literary and Art Circles. In January 2023, she was elected a deputy to the 14th Guizhou Provincial People's Congress.

== Discography ==
- Sing Dragon Boat Tune Again (Chinese: 再唱龙船调; pinyin: Zài chàng Lóngchuán diào) (2024)
- I Heard You’re Coming to Guizhou (Chinese: 听说你要到贵州来; pinyin: Tīngshuō nǐ yào dào Guìzhōu lái) (2023)
- I’m Waiting for You in Guizhou (Chinese: 我在贵州等你; pinyin: Wǒ zài Guìzhōu děng nǐ) (2022)
- July in Qiandongnan (Chinese: 黔东南的七月; pinyin: Qiándōngnán de qī yuè) (2021)
- Cradle of Dreams (Chinese: 梦的摇篮; pinyin: Mèng de yáolán) (2011)
- Sun Drum (Chinese: 太阳鼓; pinyin: Tàiyáng gǔ) (2007)
- Drunken Miao Land (Chinese: 醉苗乡; pinyin: Zuì Miáoxiāng) (2007)
- Flying to Miao and Dong Villages (Chinese: 飞向苗乡侗寨; pinyin: Fēi xiàng Miáoxiāng Dòngzhài) (2007)
- Hometown of the Beauty (Chinese: 美人的故乡; pinyin: Měirén de gùxiāng) (2007)
- Mother’s Tears (Chinese: 阿妈的泪; pinyin: Ā mā de lèi) (2007)
- Miao Family Beauty (Chinese: 苗家美; pinyin: Miáo jiā měi) (2007)
- Sweet Spring (Chinese: 甘泉; pinyin: Gānquán) (2007)
- Heart Stays in Miao Mountains (Chinese: 心留苗山; pinyin: Xīn liú Miáoshān) (2007)
- Miao and Dong Villages (Chinese: 苗乡侗寨; pinyin: Miáoxiāng Dòngzhài) (2007)
- Flying Song of Miao Mountains (Chinese: 苗岭飞歌; pinyin: Miáolǐng fēigē) (2007)
- Cheers! (Chinese: 干一杯; pinyin: Gàn yī bēi) (2007)
- Colorful Guizhou (Chinese: 多彩贵州; pinyin: Duōcǎi Guìzhōu) (2007)
- Singing on Horseback (Chinese: 放马山歌; pinyin: Fàng mǎ shāngē) (2005)
- Like Water (Chinese: 水一样; pinyin: Shuǐ yīyàng) (2005)
- Midu Mountain Song (Chinese: 弥度山歌; pinyin: Mídù shāngē) (2005)
- The Sun Rises, Joy Abounds (Chinese: 太阳出来喜洋洋; pinyin: Tàiyáng chūlái xǐ yángyáng) (2005)
- Another Flower Blooms (Chinese: 又一朵花开开; pinyin: Yòu yī duǒ huā kāi kāi) (2005)
- Plateau Red (Chinese: 高原红; pinyin: Gāoyuán hóng) (2005)
- Embroidering a Purse (Chinese: 绣荷包; pinyin: Xiù hébāo) (2005)
- Kangding Love Song (Chinese: 康定情歌; pinyin: Kāngdìng qínggē) (2005)
- Moon Daughter (Chinese: 月亮女儿; pinyin: Yuèliàng nǚ’ér) (2005)
- Picking Flowers (Chinese: 采花; pinyin: Cǎihuā) (2005)
- Stepping on the Moon (Chinese: 踩月亮; pinyin: Cǎi yuèliàng) (2005)
- Flowing River (Chinese: 小河淌水; pinyin: Xiǎo hé tang shuǐ) (2005)

== Filmography ==
- Sweet Journey (2011)
- Phoenix in Fire (2011)
- A Risky Move (2010)
- Iron Blood Police Spirit (2010)
