= Tianxing =

Tianxing may refer to:

== Locations in China ==
=== Towns ===
- Tianxing, Lu County (天兴), a town in Lu County, Sichuan
- Tianxing, Qu County (天星), a town in Qu County, Sichuan
- Tianxing, Daguan County (天星), a town in Daguan County, Yunnan

=== Townships ===
- Tianxing Township, Chongqing (天星乡), in Wuxi County, Chongqing
- Tianxing Township, Hubei (天兴乡), in Wuhan, Hubei
- Tianxing Township, Guizhou (天星乡), in Cengong County, Guizhou
- Tianxing Township, Nanchong (天星乡), in Nanchong, Sichuan
- Tianxing Township, Wangcang County (天星乡), in Wangcang County, Sichuan
- Tianxing Township, Qiubei County (天星乡), in Qiubei County, Yunnan

== Historical eras ==
- Tianxing (天興, 398–404), era name used by Emperor Daowu of Northern Wei
- Tianxing (天興, 617–620), era name used by Liu Wuzhou
- Tianxing (天興, 1232–1234), era name used by Emperor Aizong of Jin

== See also ==
- Tian Hongzheng (764–821), originally named Tian Xing, Tang dynasty general
