= Taijiang County =

Taijiang County 台江县
- County
- Location of the seat in Guizhou Taijiang (Southwest China)
- Coordinates (Taijiang County government): 26°40′03″N 108°19′16″E
- Country: China
- Province: Guizhou
- Autonomous prefecture: Qiandongnan
- County seat: Taigong

Area
  - Total: 1,108 km^{2} (428 sq mi)

Population (2020)
  - Total: 122,861
  - Density: 110.9/km^{2} (287.2/sq mi)
- Time zone: UTC+8 (China Standard)

Taijiang County (simplified Chinese: 台江县; traditional Chinese: 台江縣; pinyin: Táijiāng Xiàn) is a county in eastern Guizhou province, China. It is under the administration of the Qiandongnan Miao and Dong Autonomous Prefecture. Taijiang County is a county under the jurisdiction of Qiandongnan Prefecture, Guizhou Province. It is located in the southeastern part of Guizhou Province and the middle of Qiandongnan Miao and Dong Autonomous Prefecture. There are Highway 65 and National Highway 320 passing through the county. According to the seventh census data, as of 0:00 on November 1, 2020, the resident population of Taijiang County was 122,861.

== Administrative divisions ==
Taijiang County is divided into 2 subdistricts, 4 towns and 3 townships:

Subdistricts

- Taigong (台拱街道)
- Cuiwen (萃文街道)

Towns

- Shidong (施洞镇)
- Nangong (南宫镇)
- Geyi (革一镇)
- Fangzhao (方召镇)

Townships

- Paiyang (排羊乡)
- Taipan (台盘乡)
- Laotun (老屯乡)

== History ==
=== Before the Qing Dynasty ===
The Taijiang County is predominantly inhabited by the Miao ethnic group and is situated in the northern part of the Miao Mountains. Due to its long-term autonomy from direct control by the central Chinese dynasties, it was considered an "outlying region" by the central authorities. Historically, Taijiang County and the neighboring Miao regions have not been significantly influenced by external cultures, thus preserving the indigenous Miao culture quite well, earning the nickname "Shengmiao" (literally meaning "raw" or "untouched Miao").

There used to be nine drum societies in the area, collectively known as the "Nine Drum Miao" or "Nine Stock Miao," which were several kinship or regional organizational units. There was no unified chieftain authority present.

=== Qing dynasty of China ===
In 1726 (the fourth year of the Qing Yongzheng reign), the Qing government perceived the vast Miao Mountain area as "beyond the reach of the empire," with a population of over one hundred thousand households and lacking local chieftain governance. Therefore, they decided to open up the Miao regions and launched extensive suppression campaigns against the indigenous Miao people. Following the Miao people's failed resistance against the Qing forces, in 1733, the Qing government established the Taigong Hall, incorporating the area into the empire's territory under the jurisdiction of Zhenyuan Prefecture, Guizhou Province. Subsequently, educational institutions teaching Han Chinese were established in the hinterland of the Miao regions.

In 1855, the Miao people led by Zhang Xiumei initiated an anti-Qing war, with anti-Qing forces centered around Taigong. The conflict spread across dozens of counties and lasted for 17 years, until it was ultimately quelled by the Hunan Army.

=== Republic of China ===
In 1914, Taigong Hall was renamed Taigong County. In 1941, a portion of Danjiang County was merged with Taigong County, and the new entity was named Taijiang County, taking "Tai" from Taigong County and "Jiang" from Danjiang County. During the period of the Republic of China, the government lacked the capability to extend its ruling influence into Taijiang.

== Geography ==
The Taijiang River is located at the northern foot of Leigong Mountain, the main peak of Miaoling in the east of the Yunnan-Guizhou Plateau, and the south bank of the middle reaches of the Qingshui River. The topography of the territory is unique, with scattered mountains, basins and river valleys, complementing each other. The highest elevation is 1980 meters, the lowest elevation is 455 meters, and the average elevation is 717.5 meters.

== Climate ==
Taijiang belongs to the mid-subtropical mild and humid climate zone, with abundant rainfall, no severe cold in winter and no extreme heat in summer.

Climate data for Taijiang, elevation 641 m (2,103 ft), (1991–2020 normals, extremes 1981–present)
Month	Jan	Feb	Mar	Apr	May	Jun	Jul	Aug	Sep	Oct	Nov	Dec	Year
Record high °C (°F)	25.8 (78.4)	31.1 (88.0)	33.9 (93.0)	35.3 (95.5)	35.3 (95.5)	35.3 (95.5)	36.9 (98.4)	38.6 (101.5)	36.3 (97.3)	33.6 (92.5)	30.9 (87.6)	25.7 (78.3)	38.6 (101.5)
Mean daily maximum °C (°F)	8.8 (47.8)	12.2 (54.0)	16.8 (62.2)	22.7 (72.9)	26.2 (79.2)	28.6 (83.5)	31.0 (87.8)	31.0 (87.8)	27.6 (81.7)	22.1 (71.8)	17.6 (63.7)	11.7 (53.1)	21.4 (70.5)
Daily mean °C (°F)	5.0 (41.0)	7.5 (45.5)	11.5 (52.7)	16.9 (62.4)	20.8 (69.4)	23.8 (74.8)	25.6 (78.1)	25.0 (77.0)	21.8 (71.2)	17.0 (62.6)	12.3 (54.1)	7.1 (44.8)	16.2 (61.1)
Mean daily minimum °C (°F)	2.6 (36.7)	4.5 (40.1)	8.1 (46.6)	13.0 (55.4)	16.9 (62.4)	20.4 (68.7)	21.7 (71.1)	21.1 (70.0)	18.0 (64.4)	13.8 (56.8)	8.9 (48.0)	4.1 (39.4)	12.8 (55.0)
Record low °C (°F)	−6.5 (20.3)	−5.6 (21.9)	−3.0 (26.6)	3.0 (37.4)	5.1 (41.2)	11.3 (52.3)	13.3 (55.9)	14.3 (57.7)	9.2 (48.6)	3.0 (37.4)	−2.1 (28.2)	−5.8 (21.6)	−6.5 (20.3)
Average precipitation mm (inches)	37.0 (1.46)	32.7 (1.29)	68.1 (2.68)	106.0 (4.17)	178.5 (7.03)	192.8 (7.59)	152.9 (6.02)	131.4 (5.17)	86.2 (3.39)	85.9 (3.38)	50.4 (1.98)	28.7 (1.13)	1,150.6 (45.29)
Average precipitation days (≥ 0.1 mm)	14.6	12.7	15.9	16.2	16.7	17.1	14.8	13.9	11.1	13.2	10.3	11.1	167.6
Average snowy days	5.1	2.4	0.4	0	0	0	0	0	0	0	0.1	1.9	9.9
Average relative humidity (%)	82	80	81	80	81	83	81	81	81	83	82	80	81
Mean monthly sunshine hours	35.1	51.2	70.1	95.8	111.3	100.0	157.2	167.0	120.0	87.3	78.2	60.2	1,133.4
Percentage possible sunshine	11	16	19	25	27	24	37	42	33	25	24	19	25
Source: China Meteorological Administration

== Festive customs ==
=== Guizhou Miao Sisters' Day ===
Guizhou Miao Sisters Festival mainly refers to the festival of Miao people in Taijiang County, Shibing County and some areas of Jianhe County in Guizhou Province to eat sister meals hosted by women every spring. The festival etiquette is simple and unique. The most typical and spectacular is the Miao Sister Festival from March 15 to March 17 on the Qingshui River in Shidong District, Taijiang County.

=== The Shidong Dragon Boat Festival ===
In the town of Shidong in northern Taijiang County, there is a traditional folk event called the Dragon Boat Festival, which is held annually on the 26th day of the fifth lunar month. On this day, the local Miao people paddle single-log dragon boats.

=== The Village Basketball Tournament ===
Every year, the village of Taipan in Taijiang County hosts the New Harvest Festival basketball tournament. In 2022, this tournament became viral, following which it turned into a tourist attraction with extensive media coverage. Online users coined the term "Village BA," which has since been the tournament's unofficial title. The tournament is known for its lively atmosphere and down-to-earth style of organization, which inspired the organization of other village tournaments across China through governmental support. The stadium in Taipan is also hosting more competitions of amateur teams from across China all year round.

== Traffic ==
The 320 National Highway runs through the county for more than 50 kilometers. The county seat is only 40 kilometers away from the Kaima Expressway,218kilometers away from the provincial capital Guiyang,50kilometers away from Kaili, the seat of the state capital, and 50 kilometers away from the Kaili Railway Station of the Hunan-Guizhou Railway. The main line of Highway 65 will pass through the border. The newly built Nanshi-Wangjiang Highway is a connecting line between National Highway 320 and National Highway 321. You can go directly to Guangxi through here. The Qingshui River can reach Duyun on the ship and down to Dongting Lake.

== Sightseeing spots ==
- Ten thousand mu of grassland in Hongyang (Hongyang Wanmu Grassland is an important scenic spot in Nangong Forest Park. It is located in the south of Taigong Town, Taijiang County, at the northern foot of Leigong Mountain, under the jurisdiction of Hongzhai Village, 16km away from the county seat. Ten thousand mu of grassland is full of ups and downs, known as the "Southern Tianshan". At the end of the Ming Dynasty, Wu Sangui, the king of Guizhou, and Wu (Sun) Shifan (Dianhua period) camped here and lived for a hundred years; Zhang Xiumei, a hero of the Miao nationality in Guizhou, turned here to resist the Qing army. The Wanmu grassland is 1200-1500m above sea level, the average annual temperature is 13.7 °C, the annual rainfall is 1200-1400 mm, and the frost-free period is 253 days.)
- Drifting in the Wengmi RiverWengmi River is located at the northern foot of Leigong Mountain, 28 kilometers away from the county seat. It is located in Nangong National Forest Park in Taijiang County. The forest along the river is rich in vegetation, the water quality of the river is clean, the gap in the rapids is not large, and there is no danger of drifting. The total length of the drifting river is about 8 kilometers, and the drifting time is about 2 hours
- Miao style tourist area Shidong's national customs are well known at home and abroad. The Miao Sister Festival and the Canoe Dragon Boat Festival are world-famous, and the Miao Flying Song is well known in the art world. Shidong has exquisite craftsmanship, unique style, exquisite Miao silver jewelry and handicrafts, hand embroidery with Miao characteristic culture, and a unique national food culture.
- Guizhou Taijiang Wengyouhe National Wetland Park (Guizhou Taijiang Wengyouhe National Wetland Park is located in Taijiang County, Qiandongnan Prefecture, with a total area of 376.89 hectares.)

== Food ==
Glutinous rice is one of the staple foods of the Miao people. It occupies an important position in the life of the Miao people. It is a favorite food for men, women and children. People think that sticky rice is not hungry, the taste is light, and it is not as fragrant as glutinous rice. You can eat it without vegetables. You don't need chopsticks, and it is extremely convenient to eat it with your hands. Gifts for visiting relatives and friends, the staple food of various festivals (sister festivals), and most of them are all kinds of food made of glutinous rice.

The Miao people in Taijiang County like to eat hot and sour soup dishes. Every family has pickled cabbage, sour soup and hot and sour vegetables. The pickled cabbage of the Miao nationality is delicious and easy to make. Wash and dry the harvested vegetables, cabbage, leeks, radishes, etc., cut them finely, mix glutinous rice flour, glutinous rice or rice soup, spicy noodles, salt water, etc. with the vegetables and marinate them in the jar. Raw food can be used as a lunch for lunch, and soup can be eaten when the ice and snow are frozen.

Miao family's sour soup fish is a food loved by people of all ethnic groups in the Miao area. Although it has not been carefully cooked by the chef, and it does not cost a drop of oil or more ingredients, it is famous for its freshness, tenderness, fragrance and beauty.
