= Jiangkou (disambiguation) =

Jiangkou typically refers to Jiangkou County in Guizhou.

It may also refer to the following locations in China:

== Towns ==
- Jiangkou, Yingshang County, Anhui
- Jiangkou, Wulong County, in Wulong County, Chongqing
- Jiangkou, Yunyang County, in Yunyang County, Chongqing
- Jiangkou, Jianyang, Fujian (将口镇)
- Jiangkou, Putian, in Hanjiang District, Putian, Fujian
- Jiangkou, Fengkai County, Guangdong
- Jiangkou, Guiping, Guangxi
- Jiangkou, Yongcheng (蒋口镇), Henan
- Jiangkou, Zhijiang, Hubei, in Zhijiang, Hubei
- Jiangkou, Dongkou County, in Dongkou County, Hunan
- Jiangkou, Hengnan County, in Hengnan County, Hunan
- Jiangkou, Xupu County, in Xupu County, Hunan
- Jiangkou, Gan County, in Gan County, Jiangxi
- Jiangkou, Liuba County, in Liuba County, Shaanxi
- Jiangkou, Ningshan County, in Ningshan County, Shaanxi
- Jiangkou, Jiange County, in Jiange County, Sichuan
- Jiangkou, Pengshan County, in Pengshan County, Sichuan
- Jiangkou, Pingchang County, in Pingchang County, Sichuan

== Townships ==
- Jiangkou Township, Chizhou, in Guichi District, Chizhou, Anhui
- Jiangkou Township, Li County, in Gansu
- Jiangkou Township, Luzhai County, Guangxi

== Subdistricts ==
- Jiangkou Subdistrict, Fenghua, Ningbo, Zhejiang
- Jiangkou Subdistrict, Taizhou, Zhejiang, in Huangyan District, Taizhou, Zhejiang
