= Gejia =

Gejia may refer to:

- Gejia language, a Miao language of Huangping County, Guizhou, China
- Gejia people, an ethnic group found in Guizhou province, China
