= Danzhai Wanda Village =

Tourism town in China

Coordinates: 26°12′20″N 107°48′11″E

Danzhai Wanda Village is a tourism town in China. It was built as part of Wanda Group's poverty alleviation program in Danzhai County, Guizhou Province. The village has had a series of "rotating mayors" who help to promote it. One was Matt William Knowles.

The village is featured in the short story "Monster" by Naomi Kritzer, a finalist for a 2021 Hugo Award.

== Background ==
Danzhai is located in the province of Guizhou in Southwestern China. It has a population of approximately 172,000. Danzhai sits administratively under the Qiandongnan Miao and Dong Autonomous Prefecture. The region is known for its geographic, cultural and ethnic diversity, including the rice terraces, and Miao ethnic crafts and traditions.

In 2014, the Wanda Group designated it as the site for its ‘Enterprise Sponsored County-wide Comprehensive Poverty Alleviation’ program. The Wanda Group has committed to invest 300 million yuan to a Danzhai vocational school, 500 million yuan for a Danzhai poverty alleviation fund, and 700 million yuan for a Danzhai Wanda Village, which includes a hotel and a town district built in the Miao architectural tradition.

In July 2017, the village had its grand opening. Wanda is planning to build more tourism villages for poverty alleviation.
