= Guandong, Guizhou =

Town in Congjiang County, Guizhou, China

Coordinates: 25.8405°N 109.0416°E

Guandong (Chinese: 贯洞镇) is a town in Congjiang County, Guizhou, China. It is located in the northeast of the county, to the west of the 202 Provincial Road.

== See also ==
- List of township-level divisions of Guizhou
