= Ge people (China) =

Ethnic group

The Ge (Chinese: 歌; pinyin: gē) is an ethnic group in the People's Republic of China. The Ge people are not officially recognised as national minority group, but as a sub-group under the Miao people. This is primarily because they speak the same language as the Miao people called Hmongic language, with slight variation. They are also often classified as Gejia people, who are living in a different region. Having constant conflict with their neighbouring Miao, they demanded for separate identity, and are officially categorised under "unidentified" status. With their unique custom and traditional practices, they consider themselves as distinct ethnic group. The total population is reported to be over 125,000. Their principal habitation is the Qiandongnan Miao and Dong Autonomous Prefecture in southeastern Guizhou province of southwestern China. Although majority of the people hold the ethnic religion, a small fraction of them were converted to Christianity by missionaries who entered in the 1920s.

== History ==
The Ge people are considered to have originated from the Miao people. Their origin is explained in two different stories. According to one legend, once, an elite class of Han soldier met a Miao girl. He was in love with her and decided to marry her. At the time such inter-marriage between Han and Miao people was considered a sacrilege. The penalty was forfeit of official status and position. Overcome by love, they were married and were banished in isolation. In time, their descendants grew into a separate ethnic group. In another account, the Ge are a group of Miao in the western region who were left behind while the main Miao people migrated towards the east. On historical account, they originally inhabited the western part of Guizhou, and migrated to eastward to their present location. Migration was due to a policy of Chinese government to sympathise Miao people on behalf of the serving Miao soldiers.

== Society ==
The Ge people are separated into a number of villages. The size of their settlement vary according to the altitude of their habitation. Those in the highest altitude, such as the plateaus of Guizhou and Yunnan provinces, each village is composed of around 20 households. Whereas towards the valleys, villages are as large as 1,000 households. In contrast to other people in the same region, they do not construct their houses on elevated pilings. Their main occupation is agriculture and most of them practice slash-and-burn method. However, those villagers near to or admixture with the Han people employ sophisticated land use, from regular plowing and irrigation to use of fertilisers. Rice, wheat, and tobacco are their principal crops.

== Ethnic identity ==
After the Chinese Communist Party came to power, in 1953, it initiated classification of the ethnic groups in China. Based on social history, economic life, language and religion, China officially approved 38 of them as distinct ethnicity in 1954, out of the 400 groups investigated. The Ge people were categorised as sub-group of the main minority Miao. But the Ge claimed independent ethnicity, particularly considering their different customs and chronic hostility towards each other. Historically, they were at constant war with Miao and other people such as Qiang. Their demand for separation emerged into a political issue in the 1980s. With support of intellectuals on their claim of ethnic uniqueness, they made public shows, invited officials to investigate their villages, and publicised their demand in media. One of their most effective strategies was increased production of their handicrafts, and thereby attracting tourism. Ge women are known for their batik making, which are one of the main tourist attractions. The demand for ethnic identity came to height in 1986, when they withheld their grains for tax.

== Religion ==
The Ge people practice a combination of traditional religions, along with animism, polytheism and ancestor worship. In the past, they incorporated elements of Daoism and Buddhism into their native religion. According to the traditional animism, they believe that the world is full of demons, ghosts, dragons, angels and spirits, which are representations of the afterlife of their ancestors, animals, and trees. They have shamans to ward off evil spirits. Their unique ritual called "Harong" is an elaborate worship of ancestors.

=== Christianity ===
Although Christianity is not the principal religion, it has significant impact among the Ge people. Out of the total population, hardly 130 people have converted to Christianity since the arrival of Christian missionaries in the 1920s. The first missionary was an Australian, Maurice H. Hutton, who arrived among the Ge people in 1925. Hutton noted that the first Christian convert was in 1935. After two years there were families of Christian, and Hutton made a hymn book and catechism for them. Hutton left in 1937, and the Chinese government extradited missionaries in China in 1951, so that most converts returned to their traditional religion. A remark notes, "They believed in the missionaries and not in Jesus."
