= Congjiang County =

Congjiang County 从江县
- County
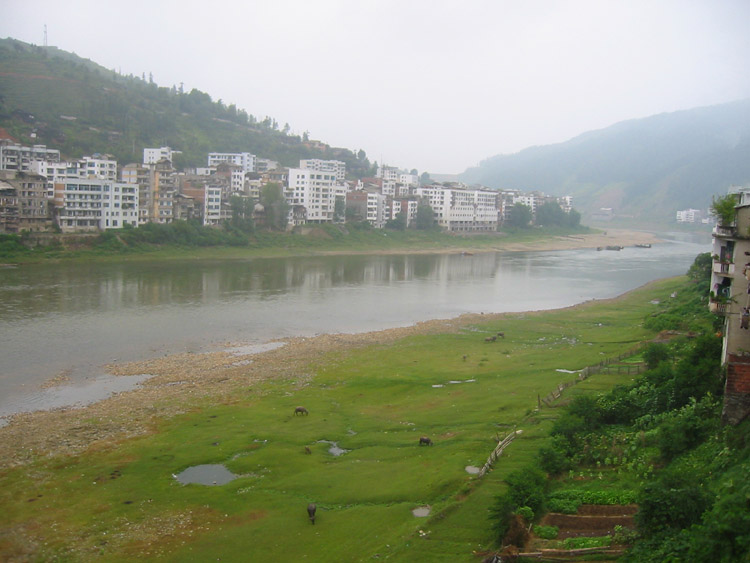
- View of the county seat from along the Duliu River (17 August 2003)

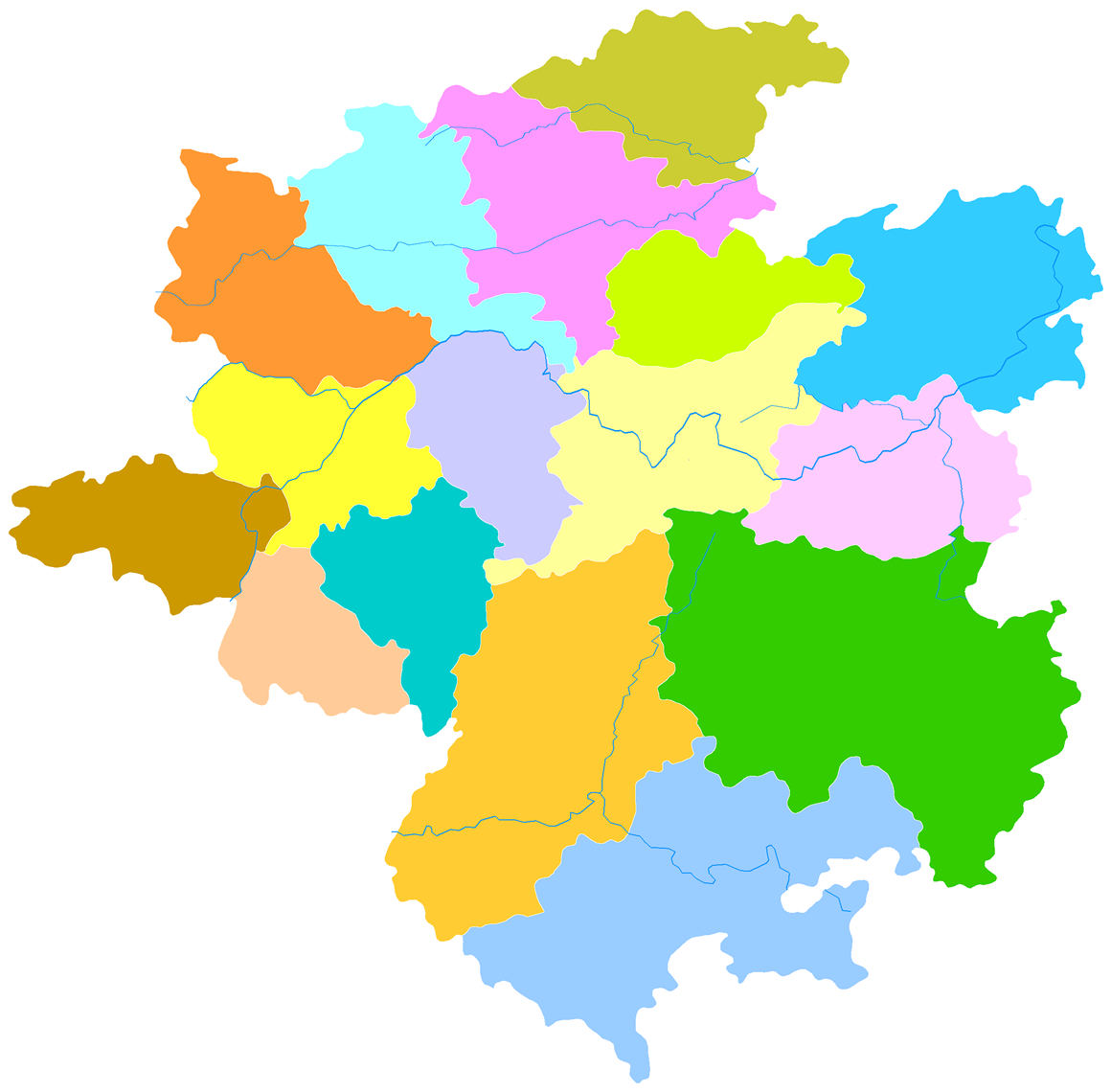
- Congjiang is the southernmost division in this map of Qiandongnan

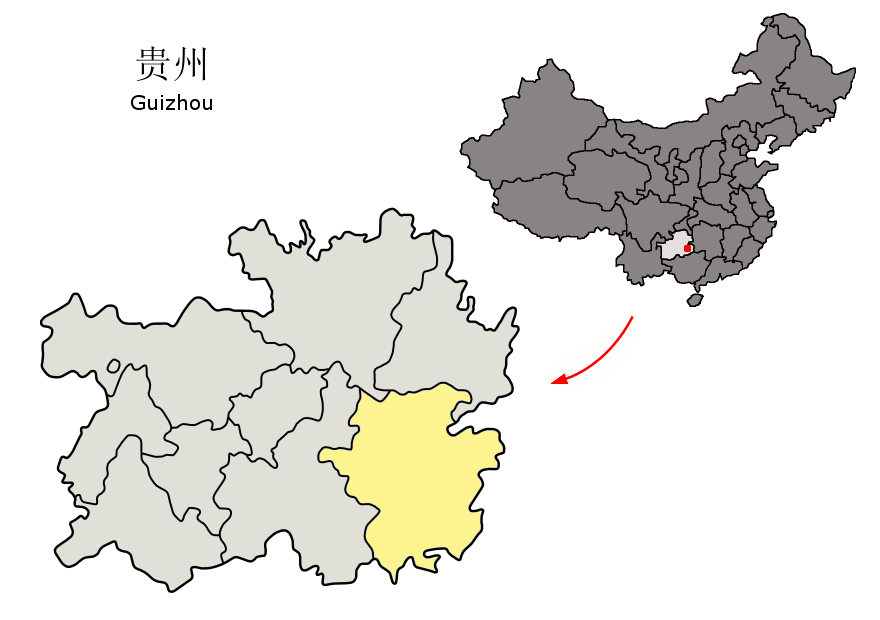
- Qiandongnan in Guizhou
- Coordinates (Congjiang County government): 25°45′15″N 108°54′19″E
- Country: China
- Province: Guizhou
- Autonomous prefecture: Qiandongnan
- County seat: Bingmei

Area
  - Total: 3,244 km^{2} (1,253 sq mi)

Population (2010)
  - Total: 290,845
  - Density: 89.66/km^{2} (232.2/sq mi)
- Time zone: UTC+8 (China Standard)

Congjiang County (simplified Chinese: 从江县; traditional Chinese: 從江縣; pinyin: Cóngjiāng xiàn) is a county in Qiandongnan Miao and Dong Autonomous Prefecture, Guizhou, China. It is divided by the Duliu River (都柳江), the upper reaches of the Liu River, and borders Guangxi to the south.

It is an important transit point as the first county inside Guizhou on China National Highway 321 between Sanjiang (Guangxi) and Guiyang, the provincial capital. A large bridge spans the river and connects the city's two halves.

== Administrative divisions ==
Congjiang County is divided into 12 towns, 4 townships and 3 ethnic townships:

towns

- Bingmei Town 丙妹镇
- Guandong Town 贯洞镇
- Luoxiang Town 洛香镇
- Xiajiang Town 下江镇
- Zaibian Town 宰便镇
- Xishan Town 西山镇
- Tingdong Town 停洞镇
- Wangdong Town 往洞镇
- Jiajiu Town 加鸠镇
- Douli Town 斗里镇
- Qingyun Town 庆云镇
- Donglang Town 东郎镇

townships

- Gaozeng Township 高增乡
- Guping Township 谷坪乡
- Jiabang Township 加榜乡
- Jiamian Township 加勉乡

ethnic townships

- Gangbian Zhuang Ethnic Township 刚边壮族乡
- Xiutang Zhuang Ethnic Township 秀塘壮族乡
- Cuili Yao and Zhuang Ethnic Township 翠里瑶族壮族乡

== Languages ==
In Congjiang County, Miao consists of the following three dialects (Congjiang County Gazetteer 1999:129).

- Dialectal area 1: parts of Jiajiu Town (加鸠镇); Zhaiping Township (寨坪乡) of Zaibian Town (宰便镇); Shangang (山岗) and Gaodiao (高吊) of Bingmei (丙梅)
- Dialectal area 2: Zaibian (宰便), Xishan (西山) (similar to Rongshui Miao)
- Dialectal area 3: Xiajiang (下江), Tingdong (停洞), Kongming (孔明乡)

== Communities ==
The county seat is known as Congjiang.

The community of Biasha or Basha is within the county. The population are Miao people, and the residents are allowed under the Chinese government to possess and use firearms as this is their cultural heritage. Demonstrations of gun marksmanship and other activities serve as tourist attractions. Katia Andreassi of National Geographic described it as "one of the most visited towns in the area". It is 7.5 kilometres (4.7 mi) from Congjiang town.

== Climate ==
Climate data for Congjiang, elevation 258 m (846 ft), (1991–2020 normals, extremes 1981–present)
Month	Jan	Feb	Mar	Apr	May	Jun	Jul	Aug	Sep	Oct	Nov	Dec	Year
Record high °C (°F)	26.6 (79.9)	30.3 (86.5)	36.5 (97.7)	36.8 (98.2)	36.0 (96.8)	37.8 (100.0)	39.2 (102.6)	38.5 (101.3)	37.2 (99.0)	35.8 (96.4)	31.1 (88.0)	28.3 (82.9)	39.2 (102.6)
Mean daily maximum °C (°F)	11.7 (53.1)	14.9 (58.8)	18.8 (65.8)	24.7 (76.5)	28.4 (83.1)	30.7 (87.3)	32.8 (91.0)	33.2 (91.8)	30.4 (86.7)	25.2 (77.4)	20.5 (68.9)	14.8 (58.6)	23.8 (74.9)
Daily mean °C (°F)	7.8 (46.0)	10.4 (50.7)	14.0 (57.2)	19.4 (66.9)	23.1 (73.6)	25.9 (78.6)	27.4 (81.3)	27.1 (80.8)	24.3 (75.7)	19.6 (67.3)	14.8 (58.6)	9.8 (49.6)	18.6 (65.5)
Mean daily minimum °C (°F)	5.4 (41.7)	7.5 (45.5)	10.9 (51.6)	15.7 (60.3)	19.5 (67.1)	22.7 (72.9)	23.9 (75.0)	23.3 (73.9)	20.5 (68.9)	16.2 (61.2)	11.4 (52.5)	6.7 (44.1)	15.3 (59.6)
Record low °C (°F)	−2.4 (27.7)	−2.9 (26.8)	−0.3 (31.5)	4.6 (40.3)	8.8 (47.8)	13.0 (55.4)	17.1 (62.8)	17.6 (63.7)	12.6 (54.7)	5.1 (41.2)	1.3 (34.3)	−3.1 (26.4)	−3.1 (26.4)
Average precipitation mm (inches)	41.9 (1.65)	47.6 (1.87)	84.8 (3.34)	110.8 (4.36)	194.9 (7.67)	232.9 (9.17)	181.4 (7.14)	116.0 (4.57)	75.6 (2.98)	72.0 (2.83)	51.0 (2.01)	35.4 (1.39)	1,244.3 (48.98)
Average precipitation days (≥ 0.1 mm)	12.6	11.0	14.9	15.0	16.7	17.0	15.0	13.0	9.7	10.2	9.2	9.2	153.5
Average snowy days	2.1	0.8	0.1	0	0	0	0	0	0	0	0	0.6	3.6
Average relative humidity (%)	79	78	79	79	82	84	82	81	80	81	80	77	80
Mean monthly sunshine hours	38.2	51.4	64.0	93.4	116.5	106.9	170.3	180.9	139.7	107.8	93.2	72.9	1,235.2
Percentage possible sunshine	11	16	17	24	28	26	41	45	38	30	29	22	27
Source: China Meteorological Administrationall-time April high
