= Jianhe County =

Jianhe County 剑河县 Kienho
- County
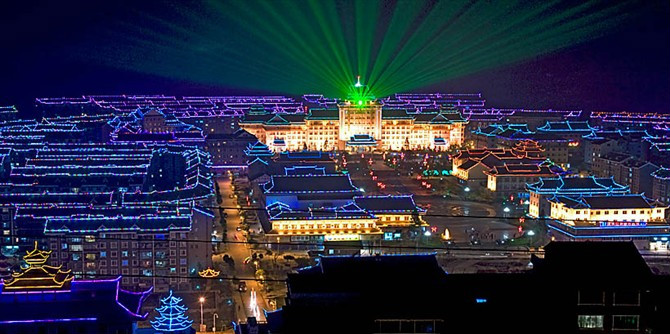
- Jianhe, summer 2012

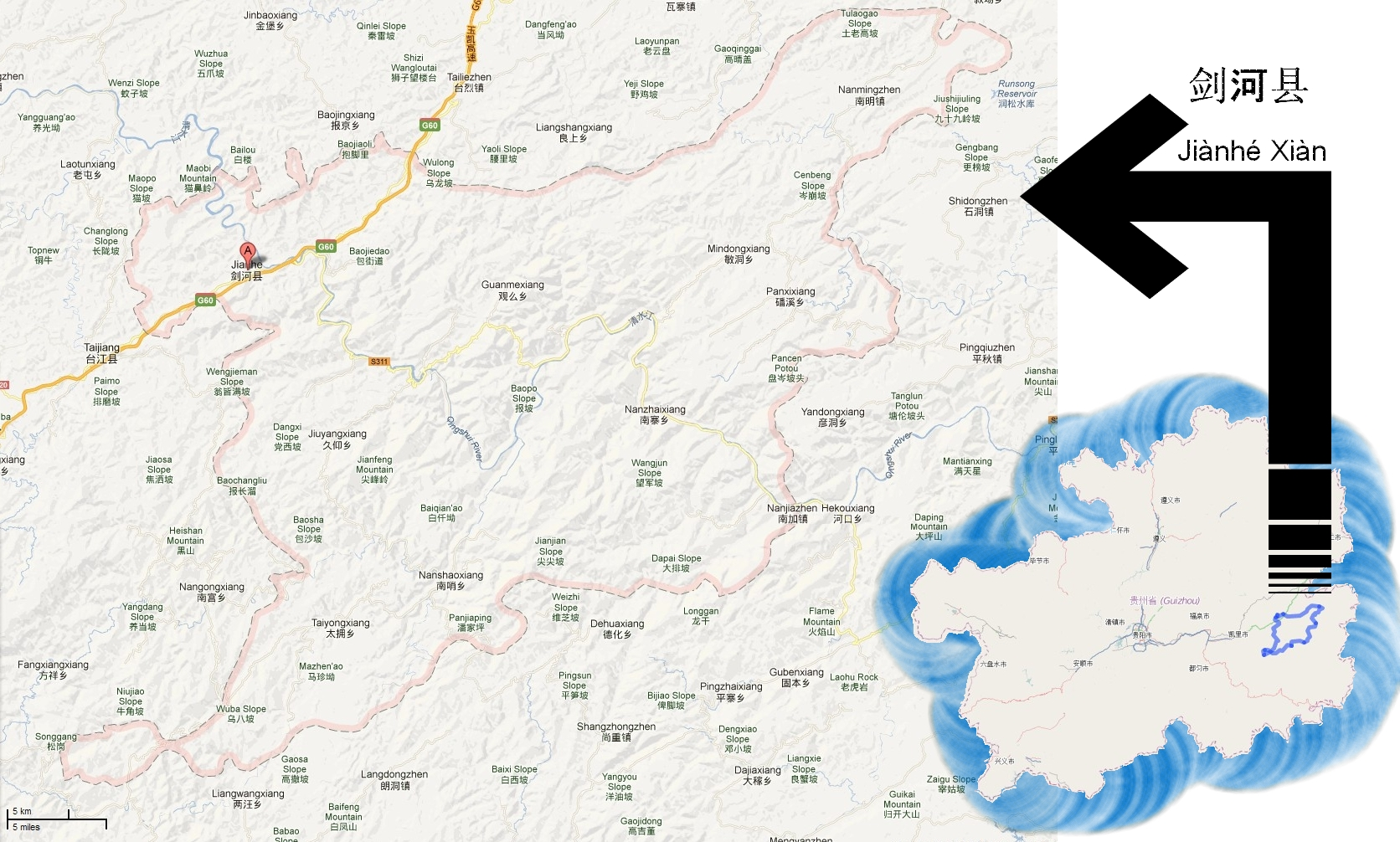
- Jianhe in Guizhou, with township-level divisions
- Coordinates: 26°43′42″N 108°26′29″E
- Country: China
- Province: Guizhou
- Autonomous prefecture: Qiandongnan
- County seat: Gedong

Area
  - Total: 2,176 km^{2} (840 sq mi)

Population (2010)
  - Total: 180,544
  - Density: 82.97/km^{2} (214.9/sq mi)
- Time zone: UTC+8 (China Standard)
- Postal code: 556400
- Website: http://www.yxgz.cn/city-76-index.html

Jianhe County (simplified Chinese: 剑河县; traditional Chinese: 劍河縣; pinyin: Jiànhé Xiàn) is in the southeast of Guizhou Province, China. Under the administration of Qiandongnan Prefecture, it is 294 km (183 mi) from the provincial capital of Guiyang, and 98 km (61 mi) from Kaili City, the prefectural seat.

== Administration ==
Jianhe County administers one subdistrict, 11 towns, and 1 township:

Subdistrict

- Yang'asha 仰阿莎街道

Towns

- Liuchuan 柳川镇
- Cengsong 岑松镇
- Nanjia 南加镇
- Nanming 南明镇
- Gedong 革东镇
- Panxi 磻溪镇
- Taiyong 太拥镇
- Jiuyang 久仰镇
- Nanshao 南哨镇
- Nanzhai 南寨镇
- Guanme 观么镇

Township

- Mindong 敏洞乡

== Demographics ==
- As of November 1, 2020 the resident population of Jianhe County was 188,507.
- 96% of the minorities populations are mainly Miao and Dong.

== Climate ==
Climate data for Jianhe, elevation 527 m (1,729 ft), (1991–2020 normals, extremes 1981–present)
Month	Jan	Feb	Mar	Apr	May	Jun	Jul	Aug	Sep	Oct	Nov	Dec	Year
Record high °C (°F)	24.8 (76.6)	32.7 (90.9)	34.8 (94.6)	36.0 (96.8)	34.9 (94.8)	36.6 (97.9)	38.1 (100.6)	38.3 (100.9)	37.7 (99.9)	34.5 (94.1)	30.9 (87.6)	26.2 (79.2)	38.3 (100.9)
Mean daily maximum °C (°F)	9.5 (49.1)	12.7 (54.9)	17.2 (63.0)	23.0 (73.4)	26.6 (79.9)	29.1 (84.4)	31.6 (88.9)	31.7 (89.1)	28.3 (82.9)	22.7 (72.9)	18.3 (64.9)	12.4 (54.3)	21.9 (71.5)
Daily mean °C (°F)	5.8 (42.4)	8.3 (46.9)	12.2 (54.0)	17.5 (63.5)	21.3 (70.3)	24.3 (75.7)	26.2 (79.2)	25.6 (78.1)	22.4 (72.3)	17.6 (63.7)	13.0 (55.4)	7.8 (46.0)	16.8 (62.3)
Mean daily minimum °C (°F)	3.4 (38.1)	5.4 (41.7)	9.0 (48.2)	13.9 (57.0)	17.7 (63.9)	21.2 (70.2)	22.7 (72.9)	22.0 (71.6)	18.9 (66.0)	14.6 (58.3)	9.8 (49.6)	4.9 (40.8)	13.6 (56.5)
Record low °C (°F)	−5.0 (23.0)	−4.7 (23.5)	−2.2 (28.0)	4.1 (39.4)	7.8 (46.0)	12.4 (54.3)	15.5 (59.9)	16.5 (61.7)	11.4 (52.5)	4.4 (39.9)	−1.8 (28.8)	−4.6 (23.7)	−5.0 (23.0)
Average precipitation mm (inches)	38.5 (1.52)	36.2 (1.43)	67.0 (2.64)	119.7 (4.71)	168.3 (6.63)	206.2 (8.12)	180.7 (7.11)	124.5 (4.90)	81.6 (3.21)	83.9 (3.30)	51.3 (2.02)	28.0 (1.10)	1,185.9 (46.69)
Average precipitation days (≥ 0.1 mm)	13.5	12.2	15.7	16.0	16.9	16.7	14.2	13.8	10.4	12.4	9.3	9.7	160.8
Average snowy days	4.2	2.1	0.4	0	0	0	0	0	0	0	0.1	1.3	8.1
Average relative humidity (%)	79	77	78	79	81	83	80	81	81	82	80	77	80
Mean monthly sunshine hours	31.5	44.1	60.1	80.1	91.8	81.4	134.2	146.3	105.6	75.0	71.3	54.4	975.8
Percentage possible sunshine	10	14	16	21	22	20	32	36	29	21	22	17	22
Source: China Meteorological Administration
