= Cengong County =

Cengong County 岑巩县
- County
- Location of the seat in Guizhou Cengong (Southwest China)
- Coordinates (Cengong County government): 27°10′27″N 108°48′57″E
- Country: China
- Province: Guizhou
- Autonomous prefecture: Qiandongnan
- County seat: Siyang

Area
  - Total: 1,486.5 km^{2} (573.9 sq mi)

Population (2010)
  - Total: 162,008
  - Density: 108.99/km^{2} (282.27/sq mi)
- Time zone: UTC+8 (China Standard)

Cengong County (simplified Chinese: 岑巩县; traditional Chinese: 岑鞏縣; pinyin: Céngǒng Xiàn), which was called Sizhou (思州) in ancient times, is a county of eastern Guizhou province, China. It is under the administration of the Qiandongnan Miao and Dong Autonomous Prefecture.

== Administrative divisions ==
Cengong County is divided into 1 subdistrict, 9 towns, 1 township and 1 ethnic township:

subdistrict

- Wushui Subdistrict 㵲水街道

towns

- Siyang Town 思旸镇
- Shuiwei Town 水尾镇
- Tianma Town 天马镇
- Longtian Town 龙田镇
- Dayou Town 大有镇
- Zhuxi Town 注溪镇
- Kaiben Town 凯本镇
- Kelou Town 客楼镇
- Pingzhuang Town 平庄镇

township

- Tianxing Township 天星乡

ethnic township

- Yangqiao Tujia Ethnic Township 羊桥土家族乡

== Climate ==
Climate data for Cengong, elevation 423 m (1,388 ft), (1991–2020 normals, extremes 1981–2010)
Month	Jan	Feb	Mar	Apr	May	Jun	Jul	Aug	Sep	Oct	Nov	Dec	Year
Record high °C (°F)	26.5 (79.7)	32.3 (90.1)	36.4 (97.5)	36.0 (96.8)	37.2 (99.0)	37.3 (99.1)	38.8 (101.8)	39.5 (103.1)	38.3 (100.9)	35.8 (96.4)	31.8 (89.2)	24.7 (76.5)	39.5 (103.1)
Mean daily maximum °C (°F)	8.6 (47.5)	11.6 (52.9)	16.2 (61.2)	22.4 (72.3)	26.3 (79.3)	29.2 (84.6)	32.2 (90.0)	32.1 (89.8)	28.2 (82.8)	22.2 (72.0)	17.1 (62.8)	11.3 (52.3)	21.5 (70.6)
Daily mean °C (°F)	5.2 (41.4)	7.5 (45.5)	11.5 (52.7)	17.0 (62.6)	21.0 (69.8)	24.4 (75.9)	26.7 (80.1)	26.2 (79.2)	22.6 (72.7)	17.4 (63.3)	12.4 (54.3)	7.2 (45.0)	16.6 (61.9)
Mean daily minimum °C (°F)	2.8 (37.0)	4.7 (40.5)	8.3 (46.9)	13.3 (55.9)	17.4 (63.3)	21.1 (70.0)	22.9 (73.2)	22.4 (72.3)	19.0 (66.2)	14.4 (57.9)	9.4 (48.9)	4.6 (40.3)	13.4 (56.0)
Record low °C (°F)	−5.3 (22.5)	−5.0 (23.0)	−1.7 (28.9)	3.0 (37.4)	7.7 (45.9)	12.5 (54.5)	15.1 (59.2)	15.7 (60.3)	11.8 (53.2)	3.6 (38.5)	−2.1 (28.2)	−4.2 (24.4)	−5.3 (22.5)
Average precipitation mm (inches)	40.0 (1.57)	39.6 (1.56)	77.6 (3.06)	120.7 (4.75)	175.5 (6.91)	189.9 (7.48)	158.6 (6.24)	114.5 (4.51)	81.9 (3.22)	88.1 (3.47)	56.9 (2.24)	34.1 (1.34)	1,177.4 (46.35)
Average precipitation days (≥ 0.1 mm)	13.7	13.6	16.7	16.7	17.9	16.3	13.6	13.0	10.7	14.0	11.3	11.3	168.8
Average snowy days	5.0	2.6	0.6	0	0	0	0	0	0	0	0	1.7	9.9
Average relative humidity (%)	81	80	81	81	82	84	80	80	81	83	82	79	81
Mean monthly sunshine hours	36.6	45.5	62.6	88.7	104.7	103.7	171.8	175.2	122.9	86.1	75.8	57.0	1,130.6
Percentage possible sunshine	11	14	17	23	25	25	41	44	34	24	24	18	25
Source: China Meteorological Administration
