= Danzhai County =

Danzhai County 丹寨县 Tanchai
- County
- Location of the seat in Guizhou Danzhai (Southwest China)
- Coordinates (Danzhai County government): 26°11′55″N 107°47′21″E
- Country: China
- Province: Guizhou
- Autonomous prefecture: Qiandongnan
- County seat: Longquan

Area
  - Total: 937.7 km^{2} (362.0 sq mi)

Population (2010)
  - Total: 122,410
  - Density: 130.5/km^{2} (338.1/sq mi)
- Time zone: UTC+8 (China Standard)

Danzhai (Chinese: 丹寨; pinyin: Dānzhài) is a county in the southeast of Guizhou province, China. With a population of approximately 172,000, it is under the administration of the Qiandongnan Miao and Dong Autonomous Prefecture. The region is renowned for its unique geographic, cultural and ethnic diversity, including the distinctive rice terraces, and Miao ethnic crafts and traditions.

In 2014 the Wanda Group designated it as the site for its "Enterprise Sponsored County-wide Comprehensive Poverty Alleviation" programme. Wanda Group has committed to invest RMB300 million to a Danzhai vocational school, RMB500 million for a Danzhai poverty alleviation fund, and RMB700 million for a Danzhai Wanda Village, which includes a culturally sensitive hotel and town district built in the Miao architectural tradition. Wanda Group's total investments total RMB 1.5 billion and the tourism village is expected to provide up to an additional 3,000 jobs.

== Administrative divisions ==
Danzhai County is divided into 4 towns and 2 townships:

towns

- Longquan 龙泉镇
- Xingren 兴仁镇
- Paitiao 排调镇
- Yangwu 扬武镇

townships

- Yahui 雅灰乡
- Nangao 南皋乡

== Climate ==
Climate data for Danzhai, elevation 963 m (3,159 ft), (1991–2020 normals, extremes 1981–present)
| Month | Jan | Feb | Mar | Apr | May | Jun | Jul | Aug | Sep | Oct | Nov | Dec | Year |
|---|---|---|---|---|---|---|---|---|---|---|---|---|---|
| Record high °C (°F) | 21.2 (70.2) | 27.9 (82.2) | 31.7 (89.1) | 32.1 (89.8) | 31.1 (88.0) | 31.3 (88.3) | 33.2 (91.8) | 35.2 (95.4) | 32.8 (91.0) | 29.9 (85.8) | 26.7 (80.1) | 22.9 (73.2) | 35.2 (95.4) |
| Mean daily maximum °C (°F) | 7.0 (44.6) | 10.2 (50.4) | 14.3 (57.7) | 19.8 (67.6) | 23.3 (73.9) | 25.3 (77.5) | 27.1 (80.8) | 27.8 (82.0) | 25.1 (77.2) | 20.0 (68.0) | 15.6 (60.1) | 10.0 (50.0) | 18.8 (65.8) |
| Daily mean °C (°F) | 4.1 (39.4) | 6.6 (43.9) | 10.3 (50.5) | 15.6 (60.1) | 19.4 (66.9) | 21.9 (71.4) | 23.4 (74.1) | 23.5 (74.3) | 20.9 (69.6) | 16.2 (61.2) | 11.8 (53.2) | 6.5 (43.7) | 15.0 (59.0) |
| Mean daily minimum °C (°F) | 2.1 (35.8) | 4.3 (39.7) | 7.8 (46.0) | 12.7 (54.9) | 16.6 (61.9) | 19.6 (67.3) | 21.0 (69.8) | 20.6 (69.1) | 17.9 (64.2) | 13.6 (56.5) | 9.2 (48.6) | 4.1 (39.4) | 12.5 (54.4) |
| Record low °C (°F) | −7.1 (19.2) | −6.3 (20.7) | −4.1 (24.6) | 1.6 (34.9) | 7.3 (45.1) | 12.2 (54.0) | 14.9 (58.8) | 14.8 (58.6) | 10.4 (50.7) | 3.0 (37.4) | −4.6 (23.7) | −7.3 (18.9) | −7.3 (18.9) |
| Average precipitation mm (inches) | 43.7 (1.72) | 44.8 (1.76) | 79.3 (3.12) | 124.0 (4.88) | 205.3 (8.08) | 274.2 (10.80) | 247.6 (9.75) | 161.0 (6.34) | 108.6 (4.28) | 94.3 (3.71) | 58.1 (2.29) | 31.8 (1.25) | 1,472.7 (57.98) |
| Average precipitation days (≥ 0.1 mm) | 17.7 | 16.0 | 19.8 | 18.7 | 18.9 | 18.8 | 17.5 | 15.0 | 11.7 | 13.7 | 12.3 | 12.2 | 192.3 |
| Average snowy days | 4.1 | 1.8 | 0.6 | 0 | 0 | 0 | 0 | 0 | 0 | 0 | 0.1 | 1.3 | 7.9 |
| Average relative humidity (%) | 84 | 83 | 84 | 83 | 83 | 86 | 86 | 82 | 80 | 81 | 79 | 78 | 82 |
| Mean monthly sunshine hours | 38.4 | 51.4 | 66.8 | 93.1 | 110.6 | 90.9 | 145.0 | 174.7 | 137.3 | 95.9 | 92.3 | 70.5 | 1,166.9 |
| Percentage possible sunshine | 12 | 16 | 18 | 24 | 27 | 22 | 35 | 44 | 38 | 27 | 29 | 22 | 26 |
Source: China Meteorological Administration
