= Shibing County =

Shibing County 施秉县 Shihping
- County
- Location of the seat in Guizhou Shibing (Southwest China)
- Coordinates (Shibing County government): 27°01′59″N 108°07′28″E
- Country: China
- Province: Guizhou
- Autonomous prefecture: Qiandongnan
- County seat: Chengguan

Area
  - County: 1,543.83 km^{2} (596.08 sq mi)
  - Urban: 3.5 km^{2} (1.4 sq mi)

Population (2021)
  - County: 170,000
  - Density: 110/km^{2} (290/sq mi)
  - Urban: 37,000
- Time zone: UTC+8 (China Standard)

Shibing County (Chinese: 施秉县; pinyin: Shībǐng Xiàn; Hmu: Qib Jux) is a county in the east of Guizhou province, China. It is under the administration of the Qiandongnan Miao and Dong Autonomous Prefecture.

Shibing's history goes back to at least 1391, when it was an important crossing halfway on the road between Zhenyuan and Huangping. The name Shibing is based on Miao language words for the stop in the middle. Shibing was established as a county in 1444. Between 1958 and 1962 it was part of Huangping County.

The total population is 170,000 as of 2021. 58.53% of the population belongs to minorities, of these, 52.75% are Miao.

Shibing Karst landscape is part of the South China Karst World Natural Heritage Site.

== Administrative divisions ==
Shibing administers over 5 towns and 3 townships:

- Chengguang Town (城关镇)
- Yanliutang Town (杨柳塘镇)
- Shuangjing Town (双井镇)
- Niudachang Town (牛大场镇)
- Mahao Town (马号镇)
- Baiduo Township (白垛乡)
- Ganxi Township (甘溪乡)
- Maxi Township (马溪乡)

== Climate ==
Climate data for Shibing, elevation 547 m (1,795 ft), (1991–2020 normals, extremes 1981–2010)
Month	Jan	Feb	Mar	Apr	May	Jun	Jul	Aug	Sep	Oct	Nov	Dec	Year
Record high °C (°F)	24.9 (76.8)	28.7 (83.7)	34.9 (94.8)	34.6 (94.3)	37.3 (99.1)	36.4 (97.5)	38.1 (100.6)	37.9 (100.2)	36.8 (98.2)	33.8 (92.8)	29.4 (84.9)	24.5 (76.1)	38.1 (100.6)
Mean daily maximum °C (°F)	9.1 (48.4)	12.2 (54.0)	16.8 (62.2)	22.7 (72.9)	26.4 (79.5)	29.0 (84.2)	31.7 (89.1)	31.9 (89.4)	28.2 (82.8)	22.4 (72.3)	17.6 (63.7)	11.8 (53.2)	21.6 (71.0)
Daily mean °C (°F)	5.6 (42.1)	8.0 (46.4)	11.9 (53.4)	17.1 (62.8)	21.1 (70.0)	24.1 (75.4)	26.1 (79.0)	25.7 (78.3)	22.4 (72.3)	17.6 (63.7)	12.8 (55.0)	7.7 (45.9)	16.7 (62.0)
Mean daily minimum °C (°F)	3.4 (38.1)	5.2 (41.4)	8.7 (47.7)	13.4 (56.1)	17.4 (63.3)	20.8 (69.4)	22.3 (72.1)	21.7 (71.1)	18.7 (65.7)	14.6 (58.3)	9.8 (49.6)	5.1 (41.2)	13.4 (56.2)
Record low °C (°F)	−4.1 (24.6)	−4.2 (24.4)	−3.2 (26.2)	3.5 (38.3)	8.1 (46.6)	12.8 (55.0)	15.1 (59.2)	15.1 (59.2)	11.5 (52.7)	4.9 (40.8)	−1.2 (29.8)	−3.4 (25.9)	−4.2 (24.4)
Average precipitation mm (inches)	27.7 (1.09)	32.2 (1.27)	60.9 (2.40)	109.8 (4.32)	150.9 (5.94)	183 (7.2)	150.5 (5.93)	95.2 (3.75)	79.9 (3.15)	83.4 (3.28)	44.7 (1.76)	24.9 (0.98)	1,043.1 (41.07)
Average precipitation days (≥ 0.1 mm)	12.7	11.5	15.0	15.8	16.4	15.5	13.1	11.4	10.3	12.9	9.4	9.5	153.5
Average snowy days	4.6	2.1	0.4	0	0	0	0	0	0	0	0	1.5	8.6
Average relative humidity (%)	79	77	79	80	81	83	82	80	80	82	80	77	80
Mean monthly sunshine hours	32.3	45.0	65.8	90.1	107.3	101.4	165.8	177.4	125.9	82.8	72.4	50.6	1,116.8
Percentage possible sunshine	10	14	18	23	26	25	39	44	34	23	23	16	25
Source: China Meteorological Administration
