= Jiangkou County =

Jiangkou County 江口县 Kiangkow
- County
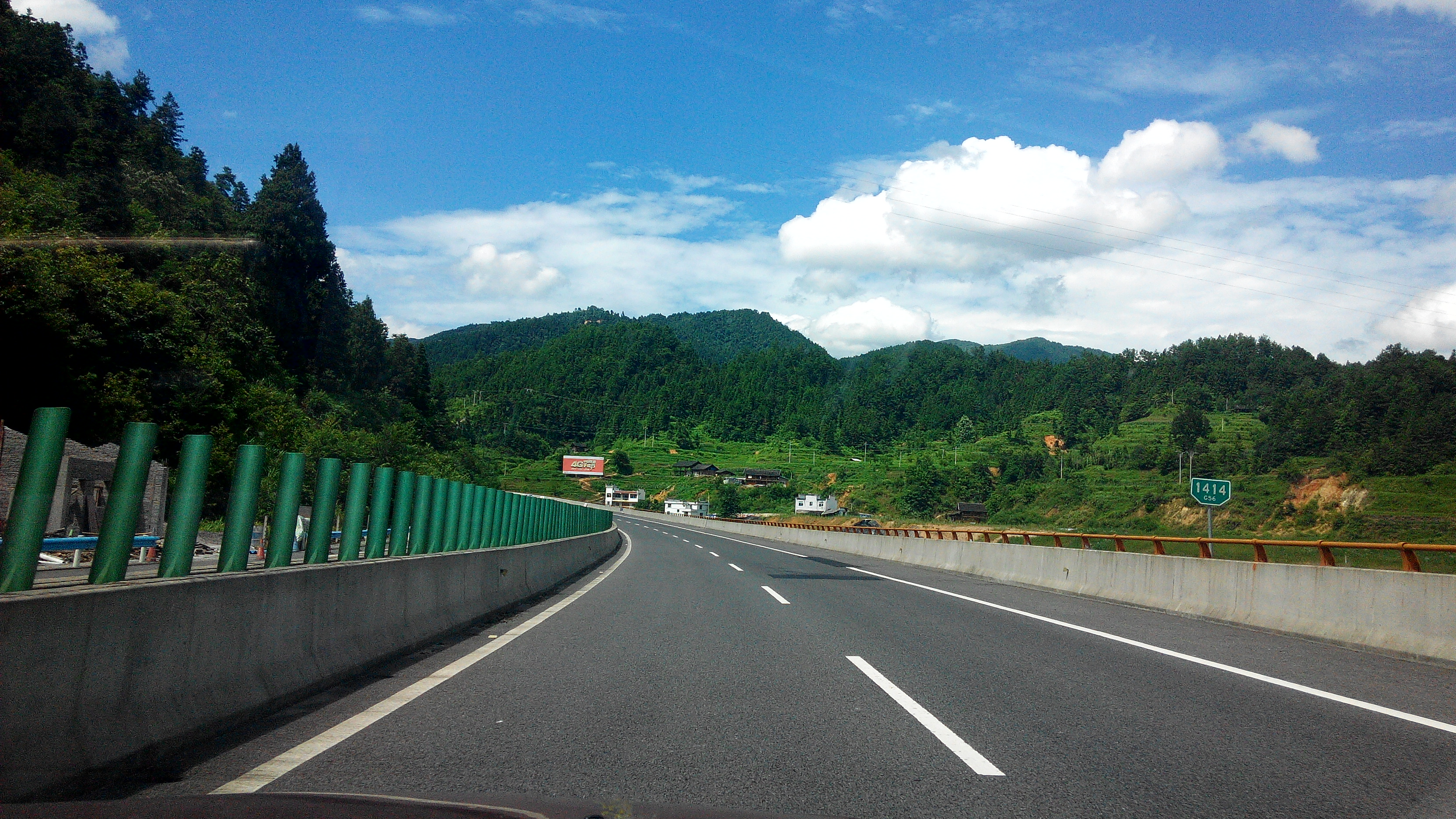
- Westbound G56 Hangzhou–Ruili Expressway in the county at the 1,414 km (879 mi) post

- Location of the seat in Guizhou Jiangkou (Southwest China)
- Coordinates (Jiangkou County government): 27°42′18″N 108°50′38″E
- Country: China
- Province: Guizhou
- Prefecture-level city: Tongren
- County seat: Shuangjiang

Area
  - Total: 1,869 km^{2} (722 sq mi)

Population (2010)
  - Total: 172,753
  - Density: 92.43/km^{2} (239.4/sq mi)
- Time zone: UTC+8 (China Standard)
- Postal code: 554400

Jiangkou County (Chinese: 江口县; pinyin: Jiāngkǒu Xiàn) is a county under the jurisdiction of the prefecture-level city of Tongren, in the northeast of Guizhou Province, China. The county government is located in Shuangjiang.

== Administrative divisions ==
Jiangkou County is divided into 2 subdistricts, 6 towns and 2 ethnic townships:

subdistricts

- Shuangjiang Subdistrict 双江街道
- Kaide Subdistrict 凯德街道

towns

- Minxiao Town 闵孝镇
- Taoying Town 桃映镇
- Minhe Town 民和镇
- Nuxi Town 怒溪镇
- Taiping Town 太平镇
- Bapan Town 坝盘镇

ethnic townships

- Dewang Tujia and Miao Ethnic Township 德旺土家族苗族乡
- Guanhe Dong, Tujia and Miao Ethnic Township 官和侗族土家族苗族乡

== Climate ==
Climate data for Jiangkou, elevation 369 m (1,211 ft), (1991–2020 normals, extremes 1981–2010)
Month	Jan	Feb	Mar	Apr	May	Jun	Jul	Aug	Sep	Oct	Nov	Dec	Year
Record high °C (°F)	26.3 (79.3)	31.0 (87.8)	36.4 (97.5)	35.8 (96.4)	37.2 (99.0)	36.9 (98.4)	39.1 (102.4)	39.5 (103.1)	39.0 (102.2)	35.6 (96.1)	31.5 (88.7)	24.1 (75.4)	39.5 (103.1)
Mean daily maximum °C (°F)	8.9 (48.0)	11.6 (52.9)	16.1 (61.0)	22.3 (72.1)	26.4 (79.5)	29.1 (84.4)	32.3 (90.1)	32.1 (89.8)	28.4 (83.1)	22.2 (72.0)	17.1 (62.8)	11.4 (52.5)	21.5 (70.7)
Daily mean °C (°F)	5.4 (41.7)	7.6 (45.7)	11.4 (52.5)	16.9 (62.4)	21.0 (69.8)	24.3 (75.7)	26.8 (80.2)	26.3 (79.3)	22.8 (73.0)	17.6 (63.7)	12.6 (54.7)	7.5 (45.5)	16.7 (62.0)
Mean daily minimum °C (°F)	3.1 (37.6)	5.0 (41.0)	8.4 (47.1)	13.4 (56.1)	17.5 (63.5)	21.1 (70.0)	23.1 (73.6)	22.6 (72.7)	19.3 (66.7)	14.6 (58.3)	9.7 (49.5)	4.9 (40.8)	13.6 (56.4)
Record low °C (°F)	−4.5 (23.9)	−4.3 (24.3)	−2.1 (28.2)	3.0 (37.4)	7.6 (45.7)	13.7 (56.7)	15.1 (59.2)	16.1 (61.0)	11.3 (52.3)	4.7 (40.5)	−1.4 (29.5)	−4.0 (24.8)	−4.5 (23.9)
Average precipitation mm (inches)	40.3 (1.59)	43.6 (1.72)	68.9 (2.71)	122.2 (4.81)	190.6 (7.50)	229.0 (9.02)	219.6 (8.65)	162.4 (6.39)	103.2 (4.06)	92.4 (3.64)	61.1 (2.41)	33.1 (1.30)	1,366.4 (53.8)
Average precipitation days (≥ 0.1 mm)	13.2	13.1	16.8	17.1	18.0	17.1	14.5	12.8	11.0	14.0	11.3	11.1	170
Average snowy days	4.2	2.6	0.5	0	0	0	0	0	0	0	0	1.8	9.1
Average relative humidity (%)	79	79	80	81	81	84	81	80	80	81	81	78	80
Mean monthly sunshine hours	39.4	41.9	60.2	83.7	99.6	94.8	160.4	171.6	123.6	82.9	71.6	57.1	1,086.8
Percentage possible sunshine	12	13	16	22	24	23	38	43	34	24	22	18	24
Source: China Meteorological Administration
