= Kaili City =

Kaili 凯里市 · Kad Linx
- County-level City
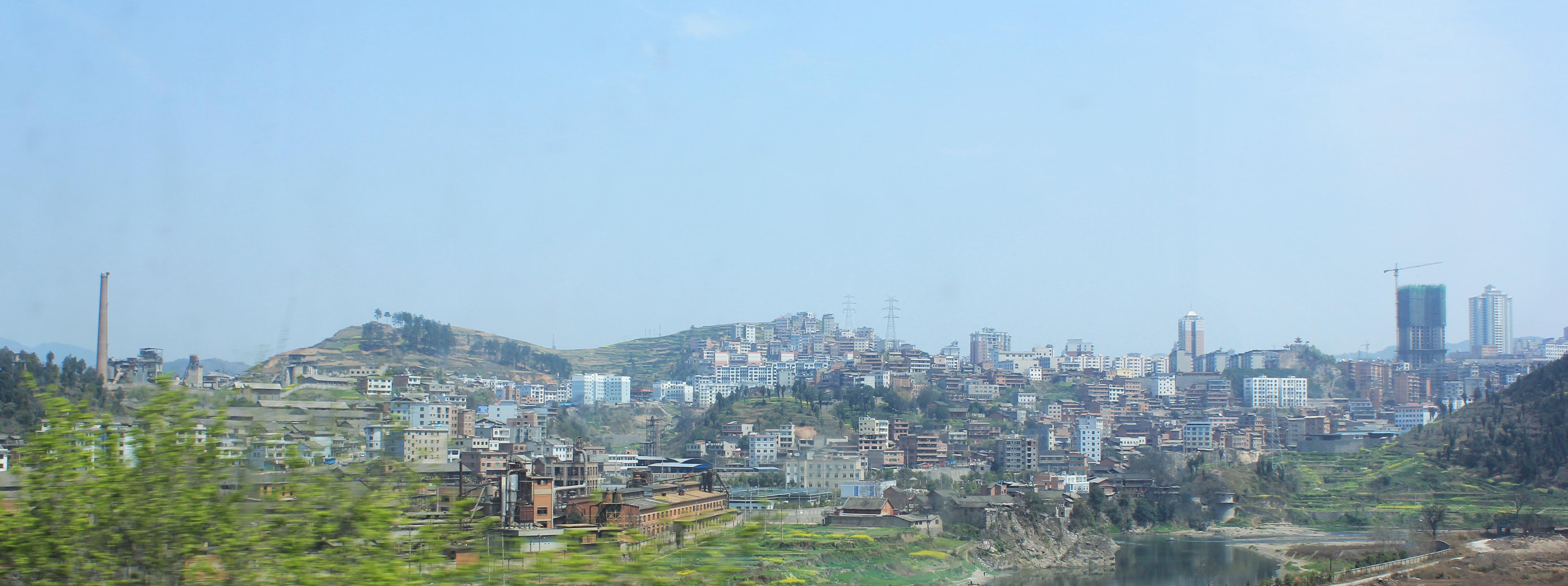

- Location of the city center in Guizhou Kaili (Southwest China)
- Coordinates (Kaili municipal government): 26°33′58″N 107°58′52″E
- Country: China
- Province: Guizhou
- Autonomous prefecture: Qiandongnan
- Municipal seat: Dashizi Subdistrict

Area
  - Total: 1,570 km^{2} (610 sq mi)

Population (2020 census)
  - Total: 709,057
  - Density: 452/km^{2} (1,170/sq mi)
- Time zone: UTC+8 (China Standard)
- Postal code: 556000
- Area code: 0855
- Website: www.kaili.gov.cn

Kaili (simplified Chinese: 凯里; traditional Chinese: 凱里; pinyin: Kǎilǐ, Hmu: Kad Linx) is a county-level city and the prefecture seat of Qiandongnan Miao and Dong Autonomous Prefecture, in southeastern Guizhou province, China. It is the center of Miao culture, hosting more than 120 festivals every year. Kaili has a population of 478,642 in 2010 and is a major producer of rice.

== History ==
The name "Kaili" is from the Miao Hmu language, meaning "newly cultivated land".

Kaili has a long history as an administrative center, earning the nickname "Little Capital" during the Ming and Qing dynasties.

== Ethnics ==
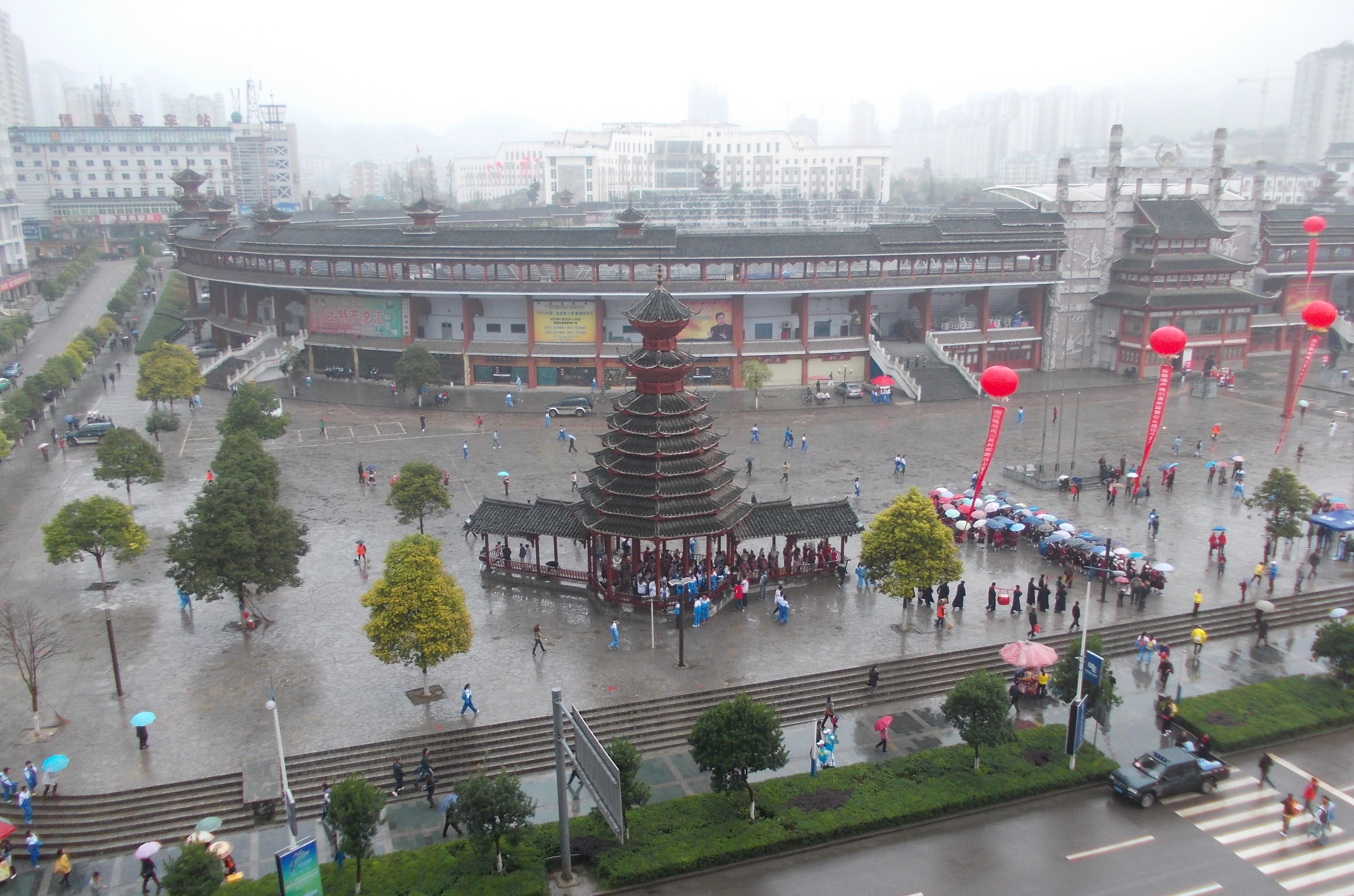
City centre

A significant population of Miao and Gejia (officially classified as Miao) live in Kaili. Kaili is host to more than 120 Miao festivals throughout the year. The Miao are known for arts and crafts, including jewelry, embroidery, brocade, batik, and papercutting.

== Geography and climate ==
Kaili City is located on the eastern side of the Yunnan-Guizhou Plateau, characterized by a terraced large slope zone. It has a subtropical humid monsoon climate, with an average annual temperature of 16.1 °C (61.0 °F), ranging from a maximum of 37 °C (98.6 °F) to a minimum of −4 to −7 °C (24.8 to 19.4 °F). The city is traversed by 153 rivers and streams, including the Qingshui River, Chong'an River, and Bara River, with a total runoff of 3.989 billion cubic meters and theoretical hydropower resources of 54,000 kilowatts.

Kaili is home to hundreds of species of wild animals, 428 species of medicinal plants, and mineral resources primarily consisting of coal, iron, quartz sandstone, petroleum, and natural gas, with one each of oil and gas mining sites.

Climate data for Kaili, elevation 720 m (2,360 ft), (1991–2020 normals, extremes 1971–2010)
Month	Jan	Feb	Mar	Apr	May	Jun	Jul	Aug	Sep	Oct	Nov	Dec	Year
Record high °C (°F)	25.1 (77.2)	30.4 (86.7)	33.6 (92.5)	34.7 (94.5)	35.2 (95.4)	35.1 (95.2)	37.5 (99.5)	37.8 (100.0)	35.9 (96.6)	33.3 (91.9)	30.0 (86.0)	27.8 (82.0)	37.8 (100.0)
Mean daily maximum °C (°F)	8.3 (46.9)	11.6 (52.9)	16.1 (61.0)	22.1 (71.8)	25.7 (78.3)	28.1 (82.6)	30.5 (86.9)	30.6 (87.1)	27.4 (81.3)	21.6 (70.9)	17.0 (62.6)	11.1 (52.0)	20.8 (69.5)
Daily mean °C (°F)	4.9 (40.8)	7.5 (45.5)	11.4 (52.5)	16.8 (62.2)	20.7 (69.3)	23.7 (74.7)	25.8 (78.4)	25.2 (77.4)	22.0 (71.6)	17.0 (62.6)	12.3 (54.1)	7.0 (44.6)	16.2 (61.1)
Mean daily minimum °C (°F)	2.7 (36.9)	4.8 (40.6)	8.4 (47.1)	13.4 (56.1)	17.2 (63.0)	20.6 (69.1)	22.4 (72.3)	21.6 (70.9)	18.4 (65.1)	14.0 (57.2)	9.3 (48.7)	4.4 (39.9)	13.1 (55.6)
Record low °C (°F)	−9.7 (14.5)	−5 (23)	−2.1 (28.2)	0.3 (32.5)	6.1 (43.0)	11.7 (53.1)	13.5 (56.3)	13.4 (56.1)	9.3 (48.7)	3.9 (39.0)	−2.4 (27.7)	−5.8 (21.6)	−9.7 (14.5)
Average precipitation mm (inches)	37.7 (1.48)	34.3 (1.35)	69.8 (2.75)	108.7 (4.28)	190.9 (7.52)	227.7 (8.96)	198.6 (7.82)	119.0 (4.69)	78.6 (3.09)	85.4 (3.36)	49.3 (1.94)	30.1 (1.19)	1,230.1 (48.43)
Average precipitation days (≥ 0.1 mm)	15.4	13.4	16.4	16.9	17.3	16.8	14.5	12.5	10.5	13.3	10.6	11.2	168.8
Average snowy days	5.7	2.7	0.8	0	0	0	0	0	0	0	0.2	1.7	11.1
Average relative humidity (%)	80	77	78	78	79	80	76	76	77	80	78	76	78
Mean monthly sunshine hours	33.8	49.8	69.4	96.7	112.2	98.2	161.0	173.2	132.1	90.0	83.2	59.6	1,159.2
Percentage possible sunshine	10	16	19	25	27	24	38	43	36	25	26	18	26
Source 1: China Meteorological Administration
Source 2: Weather China

== Administrative divisions ==
Kaili City is divided 7 subdistricts and 11 towns. Dashizhi subdistrict is the city seat which houses Kaili City Government and Kaili City Council.

- Chengxi Subdistrict (城西街道)
- Dashizi Subdistrict (大十字街道)
- Ximen Subdistrict (西门街道)
- Ximahe Subdistrict (洗马河街道)
- Wanxi Subdistrict (湾溪街道)
- Yatang Subdistrict (鸭塘街道)
- Kaihuai Subdistrict (开怀街道)
- Sankeshu Town (三棵树镇)
- Zhouxi Town (舟溪镇)
- Panghai Town (旁海镇)
- Wanshui Town (湾水镇)
- Lushan Town (炉山镇)
- Wanchao Town (万潮镇)
- Longchang Town (龙场镇)
- Xiasi Town (下司镇)
- Bibo Town (碧波镇)
- Kaitang Town (凯棠镇)
- Dafengdong Town (大风洞镇)

== Education ==
=== Colleges ===
- Kaili University (凯里学院)
- Qiandongnan National Polytechnic College (黔东南民族职业技术学院)
- GuiZhou Vocational Technology College of Electronics & Information (贵州电子信息职业技术学院)
- Qiandongnan Radio and television university (黔东南州广播电视大学)
- Kaili Career Technical College (凯里工业职业技术学院)
- Qiandongnan state school of administration (黔东南行政学院)

=== Technical school ===
- Guizhou Agricultural mechanical and electrical school (贵州省农业机电学校)
- Kaili first vocational technical school (凯里市第一职业技术学校)
- Qiandongnan School of Applied Technology (黔东南应用技术学校)
- Qiandongnan national medium vocational technical school (黔东南州民族中等职业技术学校)
- Qiandongnan Vocational and technical school (黔东南州电子工业职业技术学校)

=== Secondary school ===
- Kaili No.1 High School of Guizhou Province
- Kaili Experimental High School

== Transportation ==
=== Road ===
- China National Highway 320
- S308, S306

=== Expressway ===
- G60
- G76
- Yuqing–Anlong Expressway, Kaili–Leishan Expressway

=== Railway ===
- Shanghai–Kunming High-Speed Railway-Kaili South Railway Station
- Shanghai–Kunming Railway-Kaili Railway Station

=== Airport ===
Kaili City is served by Kaili Huangping Airport located at Huangping County.

== Tourism ==
The natural landscapes mainly include Xianglushan (Incense Burner Mountain), Jinquan Lake (Golden Spring Lake), and a number of uniquely scenic caves.

== Festival ==
Kaili City is home to a total of 136 ethnic festivals, earning it the title of the "Town of a Hundred Festivals." The main traditional festivals include the Miao New Year, Climbing Festival, Eating New Year's Food Festival, Sisters' Festival, June Sixth Festival, Gucang Festival, and Reed Pipe Festival.

== Craft ==
Kaili City is renowned for its diverse ethnic crafts, with notable specialties including embroidery, cross-stitching, brocade weaving, batik printing, and silver jewelry.
