= Qiandongnan Miao and Dong Autonomous Prefecture =

Qiandongnan Prefecture 黔东南州 Qeef Dongb Naif Zeb Qeens Donc Nanc Zous
- Autonomous prefecture
- 黔东南苗族侗族自治州; Qiandongnan Miao and Dong; Autonomous Prefecture
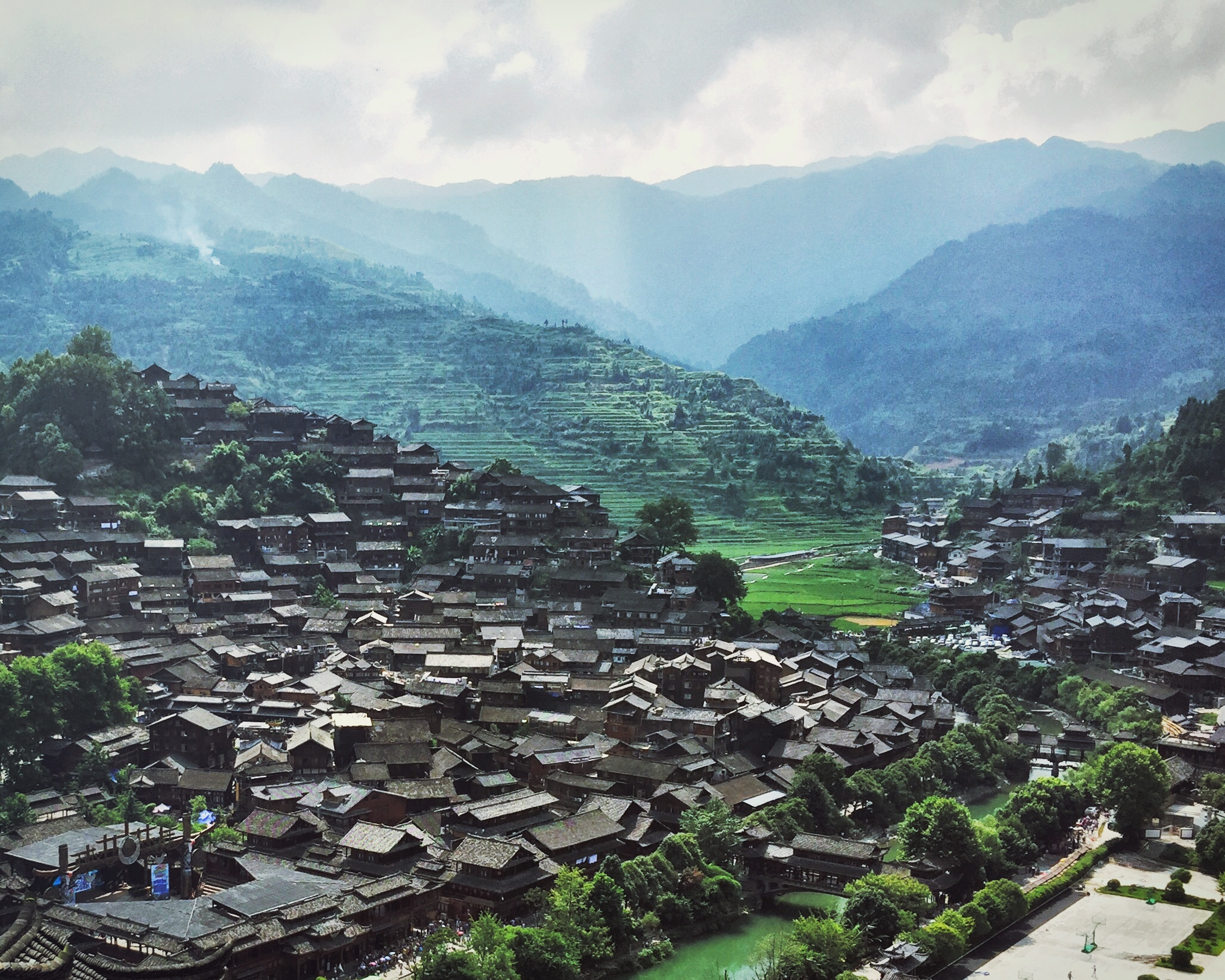
- Xijiang Miao Village

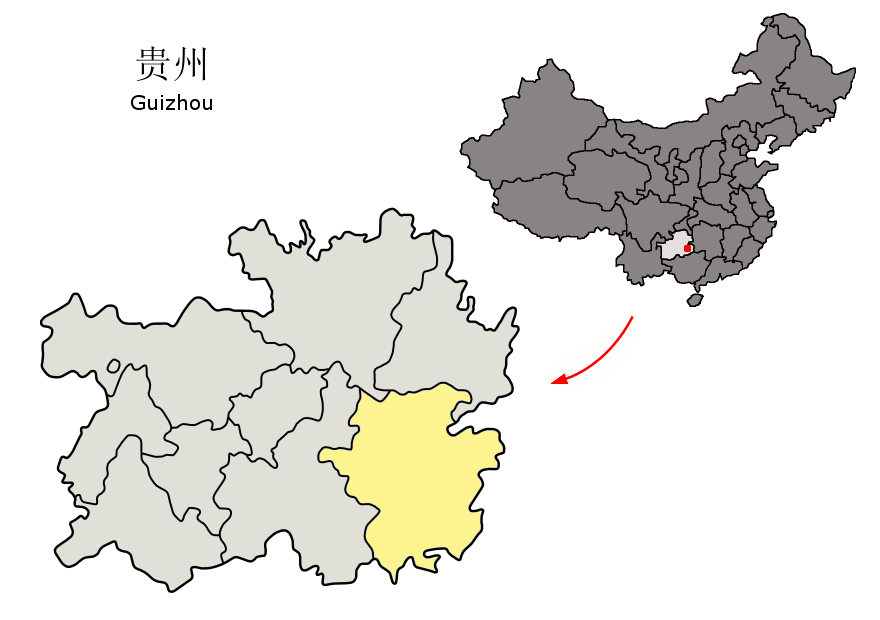
- Location of Qiandongnan Prefecture in Guizhou
- Coordinates: 26°35′N 107°59′E
- Country: People's Republic of China
- Province: Guizhou
- Prefecture seat: Kaili

Area
  - Total: 30,337 km^{2} (11,713 sq mi)

Population (2018)
  - Total: 3,538,300

GDP
  - Total: CN¥ 119.2 billion US$ 17.3 billion
  - Per capita: CN¥ 31,719; US$ 4,599
- Time zone: UTC+8 (China Standard)
- Postal code: 556000
- Area code: 0855
- ISO 3166 code: CN-GZ-26

Qiandongnan Miao and Dong Autonomous Prefecture (Chinese: 黔东南苗族侗族自治州; pinyin: Qiándōngnán Miáozú Dòngzú Zìzhìzhōu; Hmu language: Qeef Dongb Naif Dol Hmub Dol Gud Zid Zid Zeb; Kam language: Qeens Donc Nanc Nyenc Miiul Nyenc Gaeml Zil Zil Zous), also known as Southeast Qian Autonomous Prefecture of Miao and Dong and shortened as S.E. Qian Prefecture (Qeens Donc Nanc Zous), is an autonomous prefecture in the southeast of Guizhou province in the People's Republic of China, bordering Hunan to the east and Guangxi to the south. The seat of the prefecture is Kaili. Qiandongnan has an area of 30,337 km^{2} (11,713 sq mi).

== History ==
During the Spring and Autumn and Warring States periods, the area of present-day Qiandongnan belonged to the states of Zangke, Yelang and Chu. Under the Qin and Han dynasties, it was administered under various commanderies, with its administrative affiliations continuing to change through the Wei, Jin, Northern, Sui, Tang, Song and Yuan dynasties. During the Ming and Qing dynasties, the region came under the administration of several prefectures and military guards in Guizhou, while Qing authorities also established a number of sub-prefectures in the area. During the Republic of China, the traditional prefectural system was abolished in 1913 and replaced by counties. The area was successively administered under Qiandong Circuit, direct provincial administration and several administrative inspectorates following a series of territorial reorganizations.

Following the establishment of the People's Republic of China in 1949, Zhenyuan Special District was established in the area in 1949. In 1956, the Qiandongnan Miao and Dong Autonomous Prefecture was created with its seat at Kaili, initially comprising 16 counties. The counties were temporarily consolidated into seven in 1958 before the original administrative structure was restored between 1961 and 1962. Kaili was elevated from a county to a county-level city in 1983 and the city was formally established in 1984.

== Geography ==
Qiandongnan Miao and Dong Autonomous Prefecture borders Qiannan Buyei and Miao Autonomous Prefecture to the west, the prefecture-level cities of Zunyi and Tongren to the north, Huaihua of Hunan to the east and Liuzhou of Guangxi to the south. The prefecture covers a total area of 30,337 square kilometres (11,713 sq mi), with its administrative seat in Kaili. The whole state governs one city of Kaili and 15 counties. The prefecture lies in the transitional zone between the Yunnan–Guizhou Plateau and the hills and basins of Hunan and Guangxi. The terrain is predominantly mountainous, with elevations descending from west to east. Its highest point is Huangyang Mountain in Leishan County, the principal peak of Leigong Mountain, at 2,178.8 m (7,148 ft) above sea level, while the lowest point, at 137 m (449 ft), is located at Jinglang Village in Liping County.

The prefecture is situated in the upper reaches of both the Yangtze and Pearl river systems. Its principal rivers include the Qingshui, Wuyang and Duliu rivers. The Qingshui and Wuyang rivers belong to the Yuan River basin of the Yangtze watershed, while the Duliu River forms part of the Liu River basin within the Pearl River system. Qiandongnan is rich in mineral resources, with 58 identified mineral types, including coal, iron, gold, mercury, zinc, lead, antimony, copper, phosphate, limestone, barite, dolomite and clay. The prefecture possesses some of China's largest barite reserves, while its quartz sandstone for glass production and antimony reserves rank among the largest in Guizhou.

=== Subdivisions ===
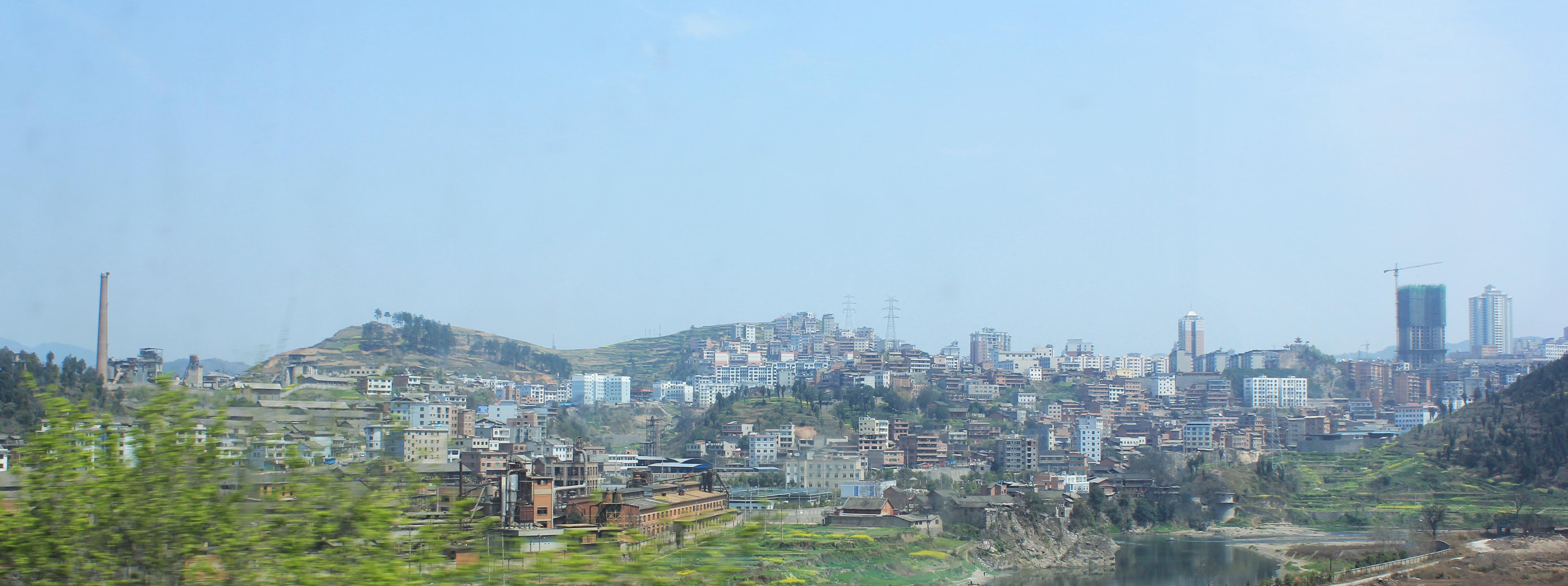
Panoramio of Kaili, the prefectural capital

The prefecture is subdivided into 16 county-level divisions: 1 county-level city and 15 counties.

- County level city: Kaili City (凯里市)
- Counties:
  - Shibing County (施秉县)
  - Congjiang County (从江县)
  - Jinping County (锦屏县)
  - Zhenyuan County (镇远县)
  - Majiang County (麻江县)
  - Taijiang County (台江县)
  - Tianzhu County (天柱县)
  - Huangping County (黄平县)
  - Rongjiang County (榕江县)
  - Jianhe County (剑河县)
  - Sansui County (三穗县)
  - Leishan County (雷山县)
  - Liping County (黎平县)
  - Cengong County (岑巩县)
  - Danzhai County (丹寨县)

Map
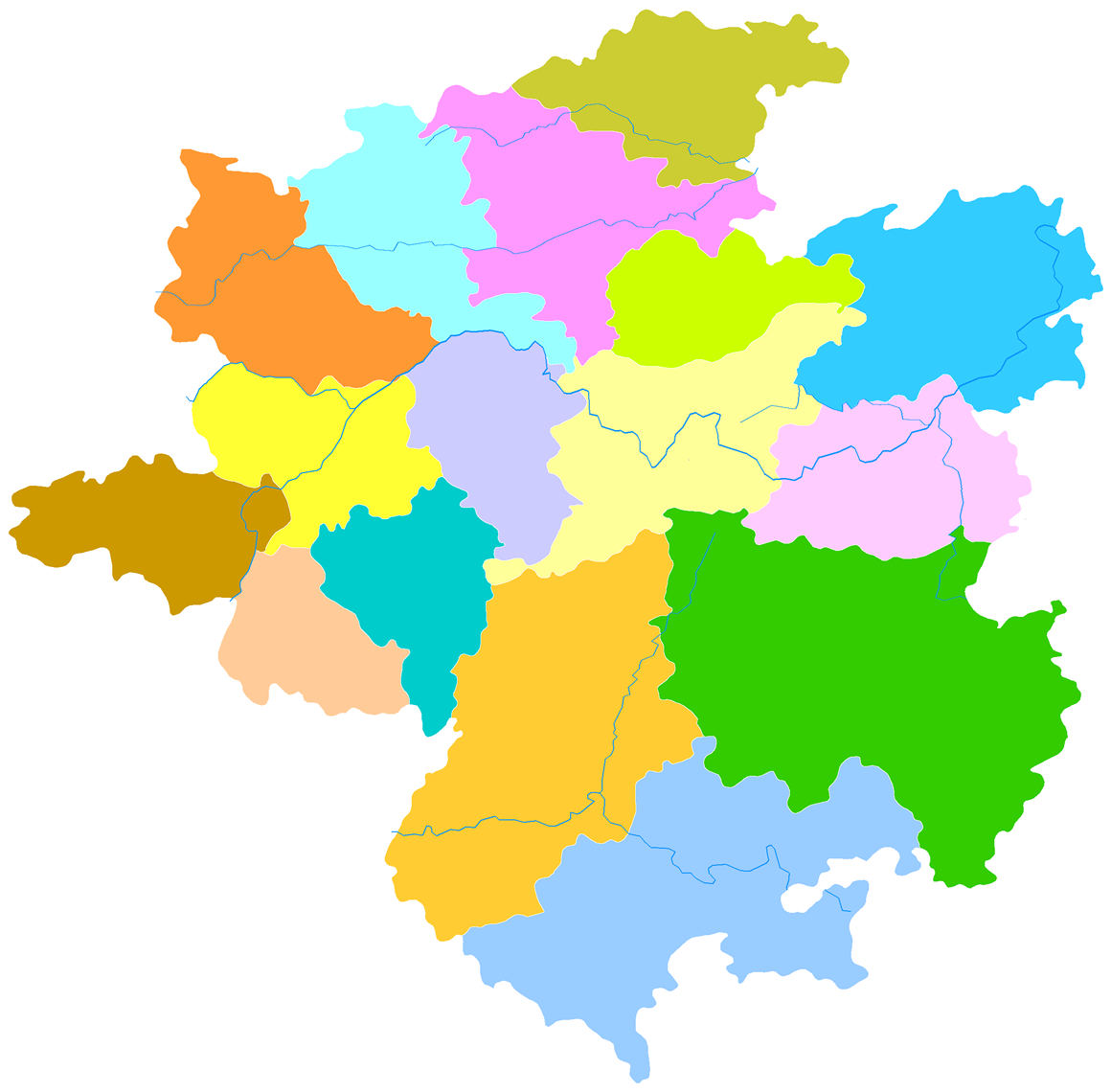

== Political structure ==
Title	CCP Committee Secretary	People's Congress Chairman	Governor	Qiandongnan CPPCC Chairman
Name	Li Jian	Liu Kaishu	Yang Guangjie	Gao Feng
Ethnicity	Tujia	Dong	Miao	Gelao
Born	December 1966 (age 59)	September 1968 (age 57–58)	March 1970 (age 56)	March 1971 (age 55)
Assumed office	October 2023	January 2026	October 2023	January 2026

== Demographics ==
As of 2018, Qiandongnan had a huji population of 4,811,900, with 3,538,300 (73.53%) of whom were living in the region. 81.3% of the huji population were ethnic minorities: 43.2% were Miao and 30.4% were Dong. There are 33 ethnic groups living in the territory, including Miao, Dong, Han, Buyi, Shui, Yao, Zhuang, and Tujia. According to the seventh census data in China, as of 00:00 on November 1, 2020, the resident population of Qiandongnan Miao and Dong Autonomous Prefecture was 3,758,622.

According to the 2010 census, Qiandongnan has 3,480,626 inhabitants. Among them, 1,821,262 (52.33%) were male and 1,659,364 (47.67%) were female. 865,119 (24.86%) were aged 0–14, 2,271,506 (65.26%) were aged 15–64 and 344,002 (9.88%) were aged 65 or above. The urban population was 905,659 (26.02%) while the rural population was 2,574,967 (73.98%).

Ethnic groups in Qiandongnan, 2010 census
Ethnic group	Miao	Dong	Han	Sui	Bouyei	Tujia	She	Unrecognized	Zhuang	Yao	Others
Population	1447257	1010352	756587	55357	34599	33676	31397	28189	24618	21732	38127
Percentage of total population	41.57	29.02	21.73	1.59	0.99	0.97	0.90	0.81	0.71	0.62	1.10
Percentage of ethnic minorities	53.10	37.07	---	2.03	1.27	1.24	1.15	1.03	0.90	0.80	1.40

== Notable people ==
- Ayouduo, Chinese singer
- Lei Yan, Chinese singer
- Bi Gan, Chinese film director
