= Huangping County =

Huangping County 黄平县 Hwangping
- County
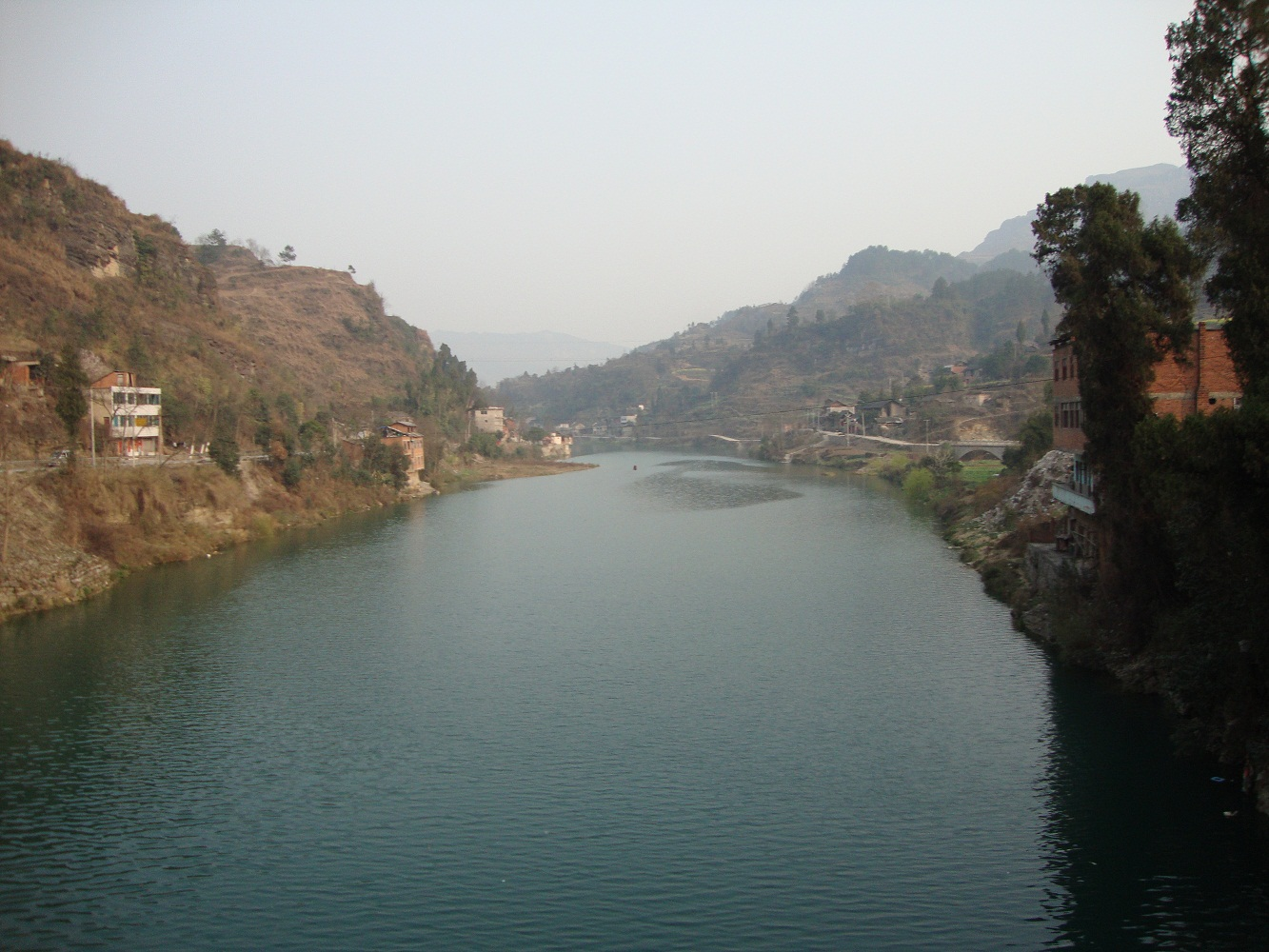

- Location of the seat in Guizhou Huangping (Southwest China)
- Coordinates (Huangping County government): 26°54′19″N 107°54′59″E
- Country: China
- Province: Guizhou
- Autonomous prefecture: Qiandongnan
- County seat: Xinzhou

Area
  - Total: 1,669 km^{2} (644 sq mi)

Population (2010)
  - Total: 263,123
  - Density: 157.7/km^{2} (408.3/sq mi)
- Time zone: UTC+8 (China Standard)

Huangping County (simplified Chinese: 黄平县; traditional Chinese: 黃平縣; pinyin: Huángpíng Xiàn; Hmu: Wangx Zangx) is a county in the east of Guizhou province, China. It is under the administration of the Qiandongnan Miao and Dong Autonomous Prefecture.

== Administrative divisions ==
Huangping County is divided into 8 towns and 3 townships:

towns

- Xinzhou 新州镇
- Jiuzhou 旧州镇
- Chong'an 重安镇
- Gulong 谷陇镇
- Pingxi 平溪镇
- Yedonghe 野洞河镇
- Shangtang 上塘镇
- Langdong 浪洞镇

townships

- Yiwanshui 一碗水乡
- Zhifang 纸房乡
- Wengping 翁坪乡

== Climate ==
Climate data for Huangping, elevation 825 m (2,707 ft), (1991–2020 normals, extremes 1981–present)
Month	Jan	Feb	Mar	Apr	May	Jun	Jul	Aug	Sep	Oct	Nov	Dec	Year
Record high °C (°F)	22.0 (71.6)	28.5 (83.3)	32.9 (91.2)	32.0 (89.6)	34.1 (93.4)	32.0 (89.6)	33.4 (92.1)	33.2 (91.8)	32.8 (91.0)	28.9 (84.0)	29.9 (85.8)	24.1 (75.4)	34.1 (93.4)
Mean daily maximum °C (°F)	7.0 (44.6)	10.1 (50.2)	14.7 (58.5)	20.6 (69.1)	24.3 (75.7)	26.8 (80.2)	29.3 (84.7)	29.5 (85.1)	25.9 (78.6)	20.2 (68.4)	15.5 (59.9)	9.8 (49.6)	19.5 (67.1)
Daily mean °C (°F)	3.9 (39.0)	6.3 (43.3)	10.3 (50.5)	15.8 (60.4)	19.7 (67.5)	22.8 (73.0)	24.9 (76.8)	24.4 (75.9)	21.0 (69.8)	16.0 (60.8)	11.3 (52.3)	6.1 (43.0)	15.2 (59.4)
Mean daily minimum °C (°F)	1.8 (35.2)	3.8 (38.8)	7.4 (45.3)	12.5 (54.5)	16.4 (61.5)	19.9 (67.8)	21.8 (71.2)	21.0 (69.8)	17.6 (63.7)	13.2 (55.8)	8.5 (47.3)	3.6 (38.5)	12.3 (54.1)
Record low °C (°F)	−5.6 (21.9)	−5.4 (22.3)	−4.4 (24.1)	1.2 (34.2)	6.0 (42.8)	11.4 (52.5)	11.8 (53.2)	13.0 (55.4)	7.8 (46.0)	3.5 (38.3)	−2.6 (27.3)	−7.3 (18.9)	−7.3 (18.9)
Average precipitation mm (inches)	36.3 (1.43)	35.0 (1.38)	69.3 (2.73)	112.2 (4.42)	171.4 (6.75)	205.3 (8.08)	158.0 (6.22)	113.0 (4.45)	89.7 (3.53)	91.5 (3.60)	48.6 (1.91)	28.8 (1.13)	1,159.1 (45.63)
Average precipitation days (≥ 0.1 mm)	16.6	14.1	17.8	17.2	17.9	16.8	13.5	12.5	11.2	15.4	11.9	12.2	177.1
Average snowy days	5.3	2.7	0.6	0	0	0	0	0	0	0	0.1	1.8	10.5
Average relative humidity (%)	83	81	82	81	81	83	80	79	80	83	82	79	81
Mean monthly sunshine hours	34.1	45.7	65.7	92.4	112.5	104.3	173.3	183.0	129.7	86.8	80.9	57.1	1,165.5
Percentage possible sunshine	10	14	18	24	27	25	41	46	36	25	25	18	26
Source: China Meteorological Administration
