= Liangsan =

Liangsan 凉伞镇
- Town
- Location in Hunan
- Coordinates: 27°05′36″N 108°57′26″E
- Country: People's Republic of China
- Province: Hunan
- Prefecture-level city: Huaihua
- Autonomous county: Xinhuang Dong Autonomous County
- Incorporated (township): 1953
- Designated (town): 2000

Area
  - Total: 268.07 km^{2} (103.50 sq mi)

Population (2015)
  - Total: 32,300
  - Density: 120/km^{2} (312/sq mi)
- Time zone: UTC+08:00 (China Standard)
- Postal code: 419215
- Area code: 0745

Liangsan (simplified Chinese: 凉伞镇; traditional Chinese: 涼傘鎮; pinyin: Liángsǎn Zhèn) is a rural town in Xinhuang Dong Autonomous County, Hunan, China. As of the 2015 census it had a population of 32,300 and an area of 268.07 square kilometres (103.50 sq mi). The town is bordered to the north by Cengong County and Yuping Dong Autonomous County, to the east by Linchong Town and Fuluo Town, to the south by Pingdi Town of Tianzhu County, and to the west by Xuedong Town of Sansui County.

== History ==
In the Tang dynasty, it was the capital of Huangzhou (Chinese: 晃州). In the Republic of China, the Liangsan Township was established and then renamed "Liangzhi Township" (Chinese: 凉知乡). In 1953 it was upgraded to a town. In 1956 it was demoted as a township. In 2000 was upgraded to a town again. In October 2015, Dengzhai Township (Chinese: 凳寨乡), Chaping Township (Chinese: 茶坪乡) and Huanglei Township (Chinese: 黄雷乡) were merged into the town.

== Geography ==
The West River (Chinese: 西溪) winds through the town.

The Liuping Reservoir (Chinese: 刘坪水库) is the largest body of water in the town.

There are a number of popular mountains located immediately adjacent to the townsite which include Mount Meiyanpo (美岩坡; 1,101.5 metres (3,614 ft); Mount Gaolaopo (高佬坡; 1,106 metres (3,629 ft)) and Mount Dengyun (登云山; 936 metres (3,071 ft)).

== Economy ==
The local economy is primarily based upon agriculture and local industry. The main specialties include rape, corn, potatoes, umbrellas, umbrellas, tofu.

== Attractions ==
The Bajiangkou Hot Spring (Chinese: 八江口温泉) is a famous scenic spot in the town.
