= Xinhuang Dong Autonomous County =

Xinhuang County 新晃县
- Autonomous county
- 新晃侗族自治县; Xinhuang Dong Autonomous County
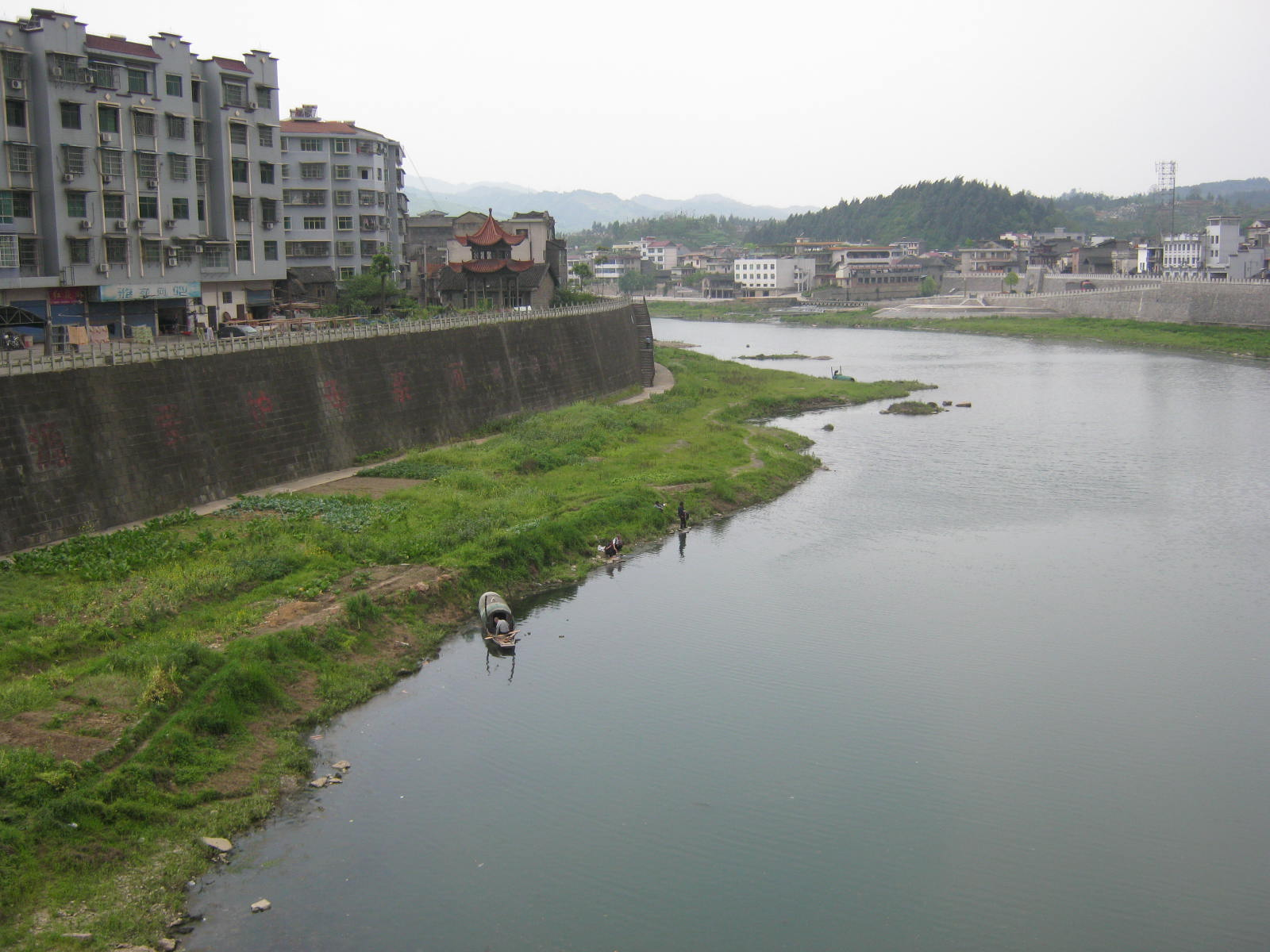

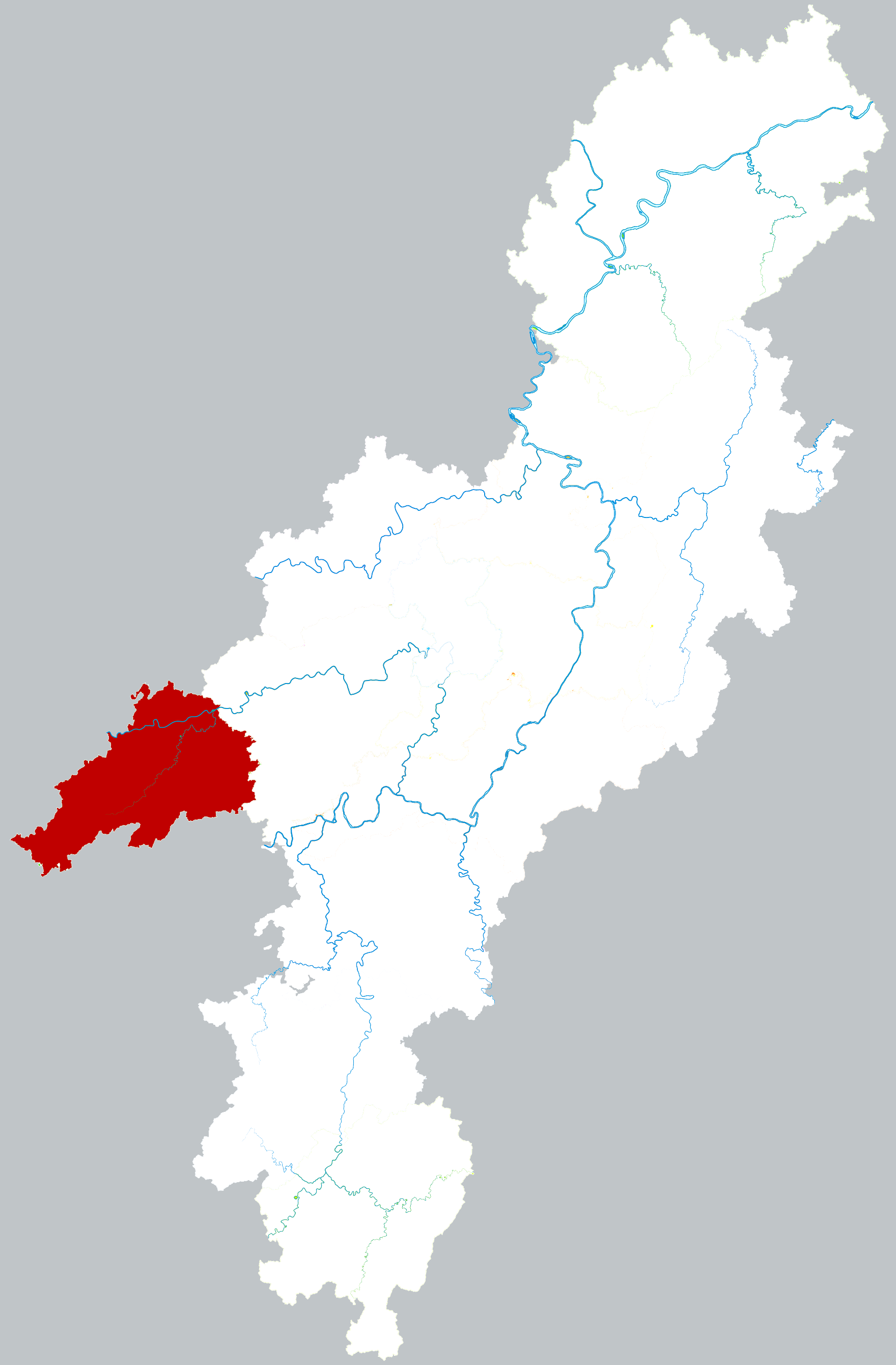
- Location of Xinhuang Dong Autonomous County within Huaihua

- Location of the seat in Hunan
- Coordinates: 27°21′32″N 109°10′19″E
- Country: People's Republic of China
- Province: Hunan
- Prefecture-level city: Huaihua
- County seat: Huangzhou

Area
  - Total: 1,510.83 km^{2} (583.33 sq mi)

Population (2010)
  - Total: 244,322
  - Density: 161.714/km^{2} (418.837/sq mi)
- Time zone: UTC+08:00 (China Standard)
- Postal code: 4192XX

Xinhuang Dong Autonomous County (simplified Chinese: 新晃侗族自治县; traditional Chinese: 新晃侗族自治縣; pinyin: Xīnhuǎng Dòngzú Zìzhìxiàn; usually referred to as "Xinhuang County", commonly abbreviated as Xinhuang, 新晃县; 新晃縣; Xīnhuǎng Xiàn) (Dong language: Xinh wangk) is an autonomous county of Dong people and the westernmost county of Hunan Province, China. It is under the administration of the prefecture-level city of Huaihua.

On the map, Xinhuang County looks like the insertion of a wedge on the eastern margin of Guizhou Province. It is the westernmost county of the province, the county is surrounded by Guizhou to the north, west and south. it is bordered to the north by Wanshan District of Tongren, to the west by Yuping, Zhenyuan and Sansui Counties, to the north by Tianzhu County, to the east by Zhijiang County. The county covers 1,508 km^{2} (582 sq mi), as of 2015, it has a census registered population of 258,246 and a permanent resident population of 249,100. The county has nine towns and two townships under its jurisdiction, and the county seat is the town of Huangzhou (晃州镇).

== History ==
Human habitation in Xinhuang Dong Autonomous County dates back to ancient times. More than 10 Paleolithic and Neolithic human sites have been found in the county.

During the Xia, Shang and Zhou dynasties (2070 BC–256 BC), it belonged to Jingzhou (荆州).

During the Spring and Autumn period and Warring States period (770 BC–221 BC), it was under the jurisdiction of Chu State (1115 BC–223 BC).

After conquering all the states, Emperor Qin Shi Huang implemented the system of prefectures and counties in 221 BC. Xinhuang Dong Autonomous County belonged to Qianzhongjun (黔中郡).

In the Western Han dynasty (206 BC–8 AD), Xinhuang Dong Autonomous County was under the jurisdiction of Wuyang County (无阳县) of Wulingjun (武陵郡). In the Eastern Han dynasty (25–220), it was under the jurisdiction of Chenyang County (辰阳县) of Wulingjun.

In the Three Kingdoms period (220–280), king of Wu State (222–280), Sun Quan, seized Jingzhou, Xinhuang Dong Autonomous County came under the jurisdiction of Wuyang County (舞阳县) of Wulingjun.

In the Southern dynasties (420–589), it belonged to the territory of the Liang State and came under the jurisdiction of Longbiao County (龙标县) of Nanyangjun (南阳郡).

In 581, Emperor Wen of Sui established the Sui Empire, it was under the jurisdiction of Longbiao County of Yuanlingjun (沅陵郡).

In 634, in the 8th year of Zhenguan period of the Tang dynasty (618–907), Yelang County (夜郎县) was set up. In 691, Weixi County (渭溪县) was established. In 704, Yelang County united with Weixi County to form Wuzhou (舞州). It was renamed Hezhou (鹤州) in 725 and then Yezhou (业州) in 735. In the late Tang dynasty, Tian Hanquan (田汉权), controlled the region and changed its name to "Huangzhou" (晃州).

In 991, the Tian family submitted to the Song Empire. In 1074, Zhang Dun captured the region and founded Yuanzhou (沅州). It was under the jurisdiction of Luyang County (卢阳县). In 1108, it restored the original name "Yelang County".

In 1276, the government of the Yuan Empire established Yuanzhoulu (沅州路). It was under the jurisdiction of Luyang County (卢阳县).

In the Ming dynasty (1368–1644), it belonged to Yuanzhou (沅州).

In 1736, in the reign of Qianlong Emperor of the Qing dynasty (1644–1911), Yuanzhou was upgraded to an fu (府). The Zhijiang County was set up here.

In 1913, Huang County (晃县) was founded.

On November 7, 1949, Huang County was liberated by the People's Liberation Army. On November 10, the People's Government of Huang County was organized. Xiao Lin (肖林) served as its first county magistrate. It was under the jurisdiction of Huitong Zhuanqu (会同专区). In August 1952, it belonged to Zhijiang Zhuanqu (芷江专区). In December of that same year, Zhijiang Zhuanqu was renamed "Qianyang Zhuanqu" (黔阳专区). On December 5, 1956, the Xinhuang Dong Autonomous County was set up with the approval of the State Council.

== Administrative division ==
As of October 2015, Xinhuang Dong Autonomous County has two ethnic townships and nine towns under its jurisdiction. The county seat is the town of Huangzhou.

Name	Chinese character	Population (2015)	Area (Km2)	Notes
Bozhou	波洲镇	17253	76.82	
Fuluo	扶罗镇	30930	222.02	
Gongxi	贡溪镇	13492	69.8	
Hetan	禾滩镇	17316	160.99	
Huangzhou	晃州镇	75200	206.09	
Liangsan	凉伞镇	32300	268.07	
Linchong	林冲镇	12677	99.36	
Yushi	鱼市镇	17255	92.49	
Zhongzhai	中寨镇	16130	133.9	
Butouxiang Miao Ethnic Township	步头降苗族乡	10929	82.6	
Mibei Miao Ethnic Township	米贝苗族乡	14571	101	

== Geography ==
Xinhuang Dong Autonomous County is located in the western Hunan province. It lies in the middle reaches of the Wushui River. It is surrounded by Wanshan District of Tongren City on the north, Zhenyuan County, Sansui County and Yuping Dong Autonomous County on the west, Zhijiang Dong Autonomous County on the east, and Tianzhu County on the south. The county has a total area of 1,508 square kilometres (582 sq mi), of which 1,485.23 square kilometres (573.45 sq mi) is land and 22.77 square kilometres (8.79 sq mi) is water.

=== Climate ===
Xinhuang Dong Autonomous County is in the subtropical monsoon climate zone and exhibits four distinct seasons, with an average annual temperature of 16.6 °C (61.9 °F), total annual rainfall of 1,160.7 millimetres (45.70 in), a frost-free period of 302 days and annual average sunshine hours between 1014 and 1590 hours.

Climate data for Xinhuang, elevation 356 m (1,168 ft), (1991–2020 normals, extremes 1981–2010)
Month	Jan	Feb	Mar	Apr	May	Jun	Jul	Aug	Sep	Oct	Nov	Dec	Year
Record high °C (°F)	26.9 (80.4)	32.5 (90.5)	36.7 (98.1)	36.6 (97.9)	36.5 (97.7)	37.5 (99.5)	39.6 (103.3)	40.1 (104.2)	39.9 (103.8)	35.6 (96.1)	32.6 (90.7)	24.6 (76.3)	40.1 (104.2)
Mean daily maximum °C (°F)	9.0 (48.2)	12.0 (53.6)	16.4 (61.5)	22.7 (72.9)	26.7 (80.1)	29.5 (85.1)	32.6 (90.7)	32.7 (90.9)	28.9 (84.0)	22.8 (73.0)	17.6 (63.7)	11.7 (53.1)	21.9 (71.4)
Daily mean °C (°F)	5.2 (41.4)	7.6 (45.7)	11.5 (52.7)	17.1 (62.8)	21.2 (70.2)	24.6 (76.3)	27.1 (80.8)	26.5 (79.7)	22.9 (73.2)	17.5 (63.5)	12.5 (54.5)	7.3 (45.1)	16.8 (62.2)
Mean daily minimum °C (°F)	2.9 (37.2)	4.8 (40.6)	8.4 (47.1)	13.4 (56.1)	17.6 (63.7)	21.4 (70.5)	23.2 (73.8)	22.7 (72.9)	19.2 (66.6)	14.4 (57.9)	9.4 (48.9)	4.5 (40.1)	13.5 (56.3)
Record low °C (°F)	−4.8 (23.4)	−4.5 (23.9)	−2.0 (28.4)	3.0 (37.4)	7.1 (44.8)	13.5 (56.3)	16.3 (61.3)	15.8 (60.4)	11.6 (52.9)	3.6 (38.5)	−1.1 (30.0)	−4.7 (23.5)	−4.8 (23.4)
Average precipitation mm (inches)	41.5 (1.63)	44.9 (1.77)	82.4 (3.24)	119.6 (4.71)	176.8 (6.96)	208.4 (8.20)	166.8 (6.57)	111.6 (4.39)	82.5 (3.25)	83.2 (3.28)	57.9 (2.28)	33.5 (1.32)	1,209.1 (47.6)
Average precipitation days (≥ 0.1 mm)	13.4	13.3	17.0	16.8	17.5	16.3	12.8	12.0	10.4	13.1	10.9	10.7	164.2
Average snowy days	4.2	1.8	0.4	0	0	0	0	0	0	0	0	1.5	7.9
Average relative humidity (%)	79	78	79	80	81	83	80	79	79	81	81	77	80
Mean monthly sunshine hours	34.9	45.6	61.4	88.6	105.1	99.8	173.5	180.3	127.8	87.9	73.9	55.8	1,134.6
Percentage possible sunshine	11	14	17	23	25	24	41	45	35	25	23	17	25
Source: China Meteorological Administration

=== Rivers ===
There are 268 rivers and streams in the county. Wushui River is the largest river in the county and it has two major tributaries, Ping Stream (平溪) and West Stream (西溪). The Zhonghe River (中和溪) flows through the southeastern county. The Dragon Stream (龙溪) flows through the downtown county.

=== Lakes and reservoirs ===
The Zhaoyang Reservoir (朝阳水库) is the largest reservoir in the county. Other reservoirs include Banxi Reservoir (半溪水库) and Guzhao Reservoir (姑召水库).

=== Mountains ===
There are more than 20 mountains over 1,000 metres (3,300 ft) above sea level in this county. Mount Tianlei (天雷山) is the highest point in the county, which, at 1,136.3 metres (3,728 ft) above sea level. The second highest point in the county is Mount Meiyanpo (Chinese: 美岩坡), which stands 1,101.5 metres (3,614 ft) above sea level.

== Demographics ==
Historical population
Year	Pop.	±%
Tang dynasty (618–907)	7,284	—
1817	56,726	+678.8%
1911	87,121	+53.6%
1921	90,432	+3.8%
1931	92,434	+2.2%
1949	139,812	+51.3%
1971	195,945	+40.1%
1989	238,524	+21.7%
2000	241,690	+1.3%
2006	265,354	+9.8%
2017	259,016	−2.4%

As of 2017, the National Bureau of Statistics of China estimates the county's population now to be 259,016, of which 41,538 were non-agricultural, 217,478 were agricultural, 3,086 were born in the year, the birth rate was 11.9‰, 4,449 people died in the year, the mortality rate was 17.15‰.

=== Ethnicity ===
According to the 2013 Census, the ethnic makeup of Xinhuang Dong Autonomous County included: 216,800 Dong people (80.13%), 35,600 Han people (13.15%), and 17,300 Miao people (6.36%).

Ethnicity	1955	1982	1990	2000	2013
Dong	62.21%	73.89%	75.49%	80.13	80.13
Han	35.67%	19.7%	16.92%	12.44	13.15
Miao	1.8%	6.27%	7.35%	7.07%	6.36
Hui	0.08%	0.11%	0.12%	0.13%	

=== Language ===
Mandarin is the official language. The local people speak Kam language, Hmongic languages, and Dungan language.

=== Religion ===
The Dong and Miao people believe in animism and worship ancestors. Buddhism is the earliest foreign religion introduced in the county. Christianity was introduced into the region during the Republic of China (1912–1949), and churches were built in the towns of Zhongzhai and Liangsan. During the reign of Kangxi Emperor (1662–1722) of the Qing dynasty (1644–1911), Islam spread as Hui people moved into the area. Mosques were found in Xijiaodong Village and Caijia Village.

== Economy ==
As of 2017, encompassing CN¥5.57 billion, the county was placed No. 81 in Hunan province.

The economy of Xinhuang Dong Autonomous County is driven by agriculture, forestry, animal husbandry, fishery industry, manufacturing industry, construction industry, and tourism. Other significant industries include finance, telecommunications, healthcare, and transportation. The county's agricultural products are mainly beef, tobacco and camphor, which known as the "three treasures of Yelang" (夜郎三宝). Xinhuang Dong Autonomous County's manufacturing products include paper, food processing, cement production, and battery production. The service sector of the county's economy includes things like banking, health care, education, tourism and government.

=== Natural resources ===
Xinhuang Dong Autonomous County is rich in mineral resources, including mercury, iron, copper, lead, zinc, vanadium, nickel, gold, silver, potassium, limestone, barite and orthoclase. The barite reserves in the county reach 280 million tons, and the orthoclase reserves reach 900 million tons, which known as the "capital of barite in China" (中国重晶石之都) and the "capital of orthoclase in China" (中国钾长石之都).

== Education ==
By the end of 2017, Xinhuang Dong Autonomous County had one county vocational secondary school, two high schools, 11 middle schools, 18 primary schools and 22 kindergartens.

== Transportation ==
=== Highway ===
The G60 Shanghai–Kunming Expressway, more commonly known as "Hukun Expressway", is an east–west highway passing through the county's downtown, commercial, and industrial districts in the northern part of the county.

The G320 National Highway is an east–west highway passing through commercial and residential districts north of the county limits.

The Provincial Highway S232 passes through the center county leading southwards to the towns of Hetan, Fuluo, and Gongxi.

=== Rail ===
The Shanghai–Kunming high-speed railway is a high-speed railway passes across the towns of Bozhou, Huangzhou, Yushi, and Linchong. Xinhuang railway station is an intermediate stop on the Shanghai–Kunming railway.

== Tourism ==
The famous natural landscapes of Xinhuang Dong Autonomous County are: Yelang Valley (夜郎谷), Huangjialong Forest Park (黄家垅森林公园), Tianlei Mountain (天雷山), Liangsan Hot Spring (凉伞温泉), Xianrenqiao (仙人桥), Xuanjing Mountain (悬镜山) and Longtang Lake (龙塘湖). Major human landscape in Xinhuang Dong Autonomous County include Stone Pavilion (石凉亭), Huangzhou Wind-rain Bridge, Three-arch Bridge (三拱桥), Zhenjiang Pavilion (镇江阁), and Longxi Ancient City (龙溪古城). Major Buddhist temples in the county include Songlin Temple (松林寺), Yanlai Temple, and Feishan Temple (飞山庙). Major Taoist temples in the county include Palace of the Kitchen God (灶王宫), Longevity Palace (万寿宫), and Pavilion of Jade Emperor (玉皇阁).

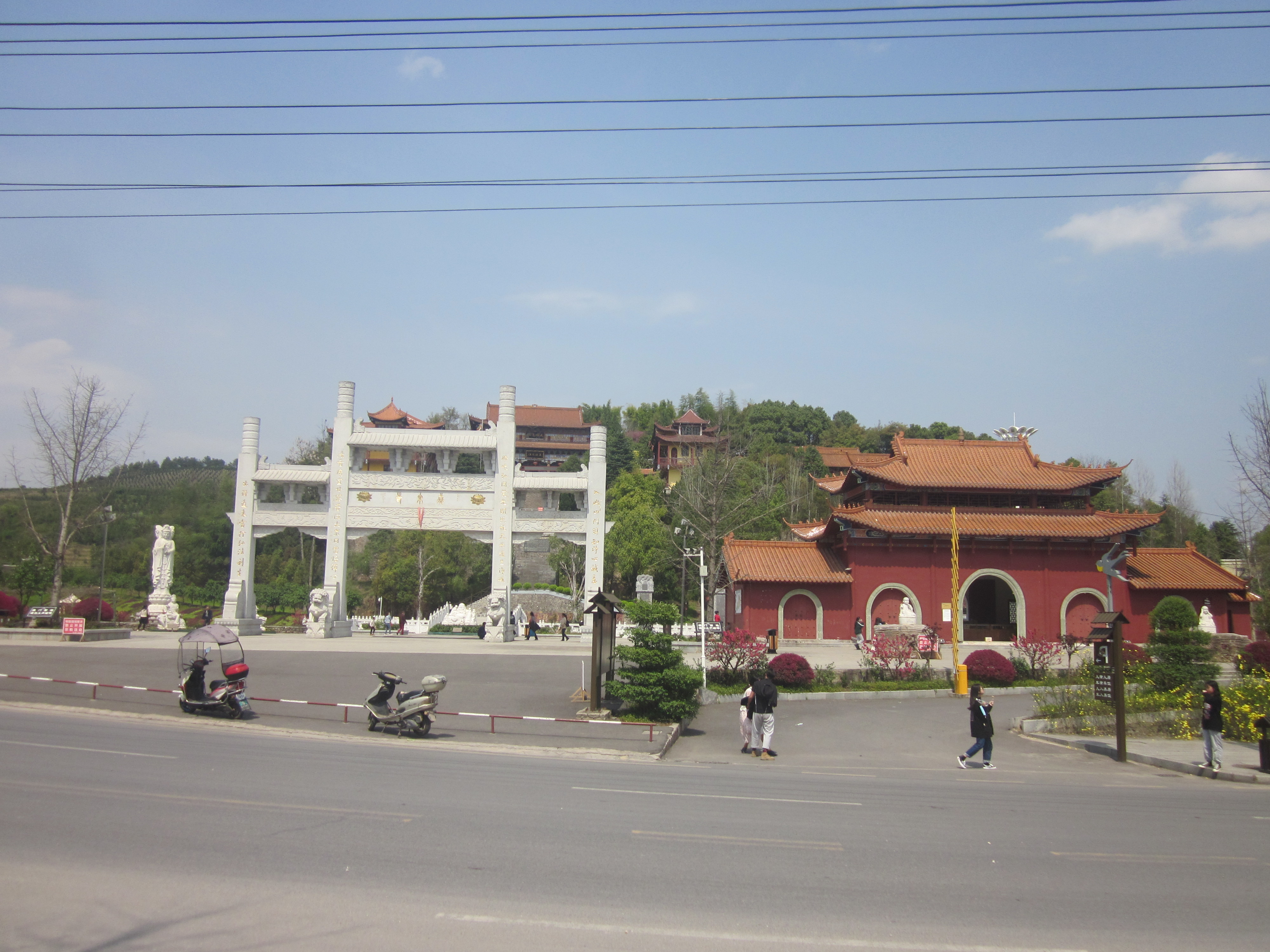
Frontal view of Yanlai Temple.

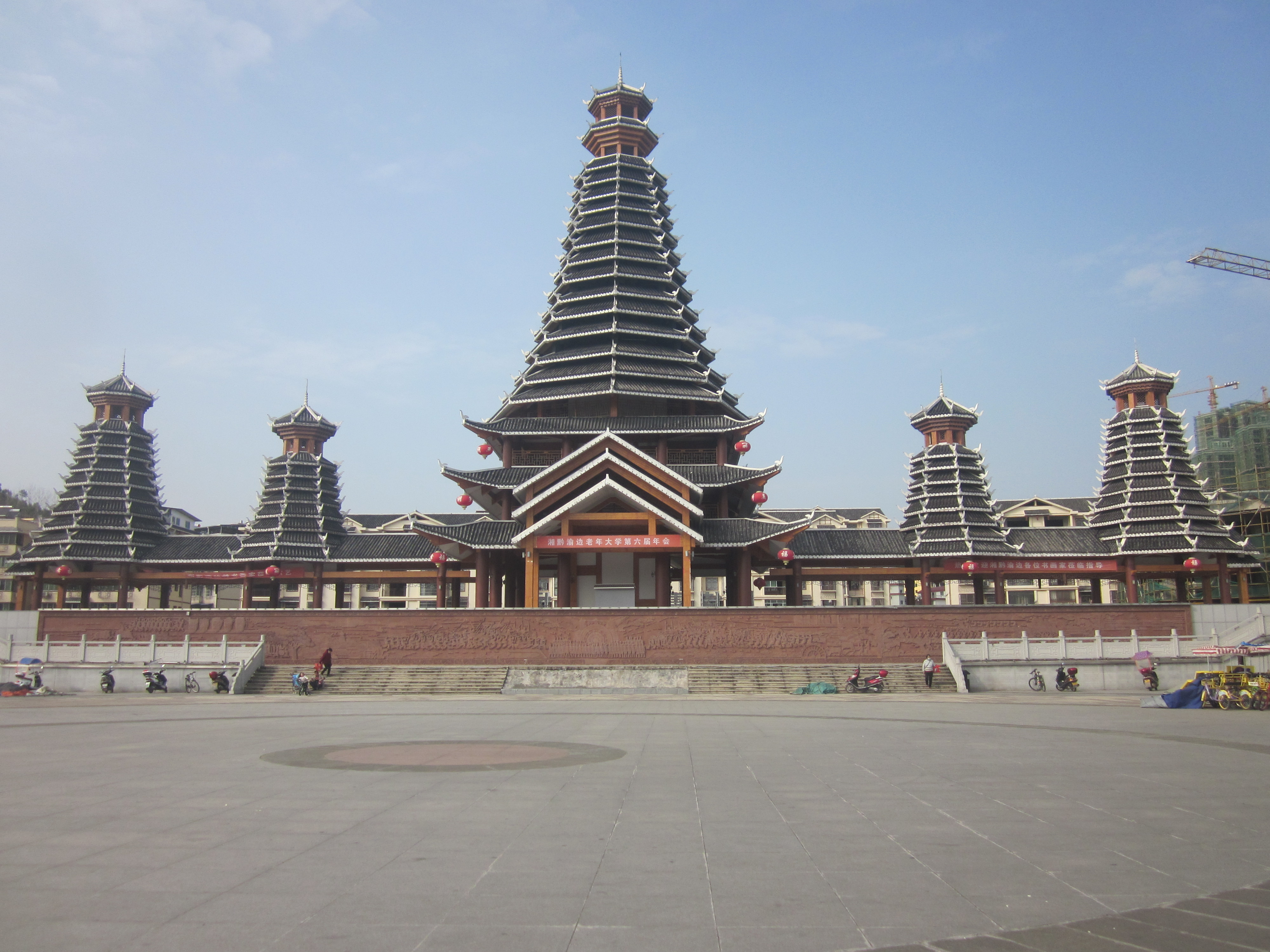
Drum Tower Square.

== Notable people ==
- Wu Qiang (born 1966), Chinese politician currently serving as party secretary of Bijie
