= Yushi, Hunan =

Yushi 鱼市镇
- Town
- Location in Hunan
- Coordinates: 27°20′05″N 109°05′22″E
- Country: People's Republic of China
- Province: Hunan
- Prefecture-level city: Huaihua
- Autonomous county: Xinhuang Dong Autonomous County
- Incorporated (township): 1956
- Designated (town): 1984

Area
  - Total: 94.56 km^{2} (36.51 sq mi)

Population (2017)
  - Total: 17,700
  - Density: 187/km^{2} (485/sq mi)
- Time zone: UTC+08:00 (China Standard)
- Postal code: 419203
- Area code: 0745

Yushi (simplified Chinese: 鱼市镇; traditional Chinese: 魚市鎮; pinyin: Yúshiì Zhèn) is a rural town in Xinhuang Dong Autonomous County, Hunan, China. As of the 2017 census it had a population of 17,700 and an area of 94.56 square kilometres (36.51 sq mi). The town shares a border with Linchong Town to the west, Huangzhou Town to the east, Guizhou Province to the north, and Fuluo Town to the south.

== History ==
During the Jiaqing period of the Qing dynasty (1644–1911), it was under the jurisdiction of Huangzhou (Chinese: 晃州). In the Republic of China (1912–1949), it came under the jurisdiction of the 3rd Administrative District. After the establishment of the Communist State in July 1956, the Yushi Township was set up. In September 1958, it was renamed "Yushi People's Commune". In 1984, it restored the township system. In December 1984, it was upgraded to a town. In October 2015, some parts of the Yanjia Township (Chinese: 晏家乡) were incorporated into the town.

== Geography ==
The Wushui River (Chinese: 潕水) winds through the town.

== Economy ==
The local economy is primarily based upon agriculture and local industry. Tea oil and tung oil are major specialties.

== Transportation ==
The G60 Shanghai–Kunming Expressway passes across the town northeast to southwest.

The Shanghai–Kunming high-speed railway is a high-speed railway passes across the town northeast to southwest.
