= Butouxiang Miao Ethnic Township =

Butouxiang Miao Ethnic Township 步头降苗族乡
- Ethnic Township
- Location in Hunan
- Coordinates: 27°18′05″N 109°22′31″E
- Country: People's Republic of China
- Province: Hunan
- Prefecture-level city: Huaihua
- Autonomous county: Xinhuang Dong Autonomous County
- Incorporated (township): 1956

Area
  - Total: 82.6 km^{2} (31.9 sq mi)
- Elevation: 800 m (2,600 ft)

Population (2015)
  - Total: 10,929
  - Density: 132/km^{2} (343/sq mi)
- Time zone: UTC+08:00 (China Standard)
- Postal code: 419208
- Area code: 0745

Butouxiang Miao Ethnic Township (simplified Chinese: 步头降苗族乡; traditional Chinese: 步頭降苗族鄉; pinyin: Bùtóuxiáng Miáozú Xiāng) is a rural ethnic township in Xinhuang Dong Autonomous County, Hunan, China. As of the 2015 census it had a population of 10,929 and an area of 82.6-square-kilometre (31.9 sq mi). Miao and Dong people accounted for 48.5% and 44.5% of the total population respectively. It borders Bozhou Town in the northwest, Zhijiang Dong Autonomous County in the northeast and east, Mibei Miao Ethnic Township in the south, Zhongzhai Town in the southwest, and Hetan Town in the west.

== History ==
Before 1955 it belonged to Baihe Township (Chinese: 百合乡) of Zhijiang Dong Autonomous County. In 1956 it came under the jurisdiction of Xinhuang Dong Autonomous County and the Butouxiang Township was established. In September 1958, it was renamed "Butouxiang People's Commune". In June 1984, its name was changed to "Butouxiang Miao Ethnic Township".

== Administrative division ==
As of 2015, the township is divided into 14 villages: Gubaxi (Chinese: 姑巴溪村), Tuluping (Chinese: 土鹿坪村), Youxi (Chinese: 酉溪村), Xinjiang (Chinese: 新江村), Leijiatian (Chinese: 雷家田村), Tianlei (Chinese: 天雷村), Huaikou (Chinese: 槐口村), Chashan (Chinese: 茶山村), Laixi (Chinese: 涞溪村), Tuixi (Chinese: 腿溪村), Dabingxi (Chinese: 大秉溪村), Huangyang (Chinese: 黄阳村), and Butouxiang (Chinese: 步头降村).

== Geography ==
The township is surrounded by mountains, there are 14 peaks over 1,000-metre (3,300 ft) above sea level in this township. The highest point in the township is Mount Tianlei (Chinese: 天雷山) which stands 1,136.3 metres (3,728 ft) above sea level. The average elevation of the town is 800-metre (2,600 ft) above sea level.

The forest coverage of this town is 91.45%.

There are nine streams in the township. Xinjiang Stream (Chinese: 新江溪), a tributary of the Qingshui River (Chinese: 清水江), winds through the township.

A small part of the Guzhao Reservoir (Chinese: 姑召水库) is in this town.

== Economy ==
The local economy is primarily based upon agriculture and local industry. Wood processing is a major industry.

== Education ==
There are one ordinary middle school, one central primary school and 14 village primary schools in this township.

== Transportation ==
The G60 Shanghai–Kunming Expressway passes across the northern township east to west.
