= Linchong =

Linchong 林冲镇
- Town
- Location in Hunan
- Coordinates: 27°17′00″N 109°02′05″E
- Country: People's Republic of China
- Province: Hunan
- Prefecture-level city: Huaihua
- Autonomous county: Xinhuang Dong Autonomous County
- Incorporated (township): 1984
- Designated (town): 2015

Area
  - Total: 99.36 km^{2} (38.36 sq mi)

Population (2015)
  - Total: 12,677
  - Density: 127.6/km^{2} (330.4/sq mi)
- Time zone: UTC+08:00 (China Standard)
- Postal code: 419204
- Area code: 0745

Linchong (simplified Chinese: 林冲镇; traditional Chinese: 林沖鎮; pinyin: Línchōng Zhèn) is a rural town in Xinhuang Dong Autonomous County, Hunan, China. As of the 2015 census it had a population of 12677 and an area of 99.36 square kilometres (38.36 sq mi). It is approximately 22 kilometres (14 mi) northeast of the downtown Xinhaung Dong Autonomous County and 10 kilometres (6.2 mi) southwest of the downtown Yuping Dong Autonomous County. It borders Zhujiachang Town of Yuping County in the north, Fuluo Town in the southeast, Yushi Town in the northeast, and Liangsan Town in the west and southwest.

== History ==
In 1961, Linchong People's Commune was set up. In 1984 was incorporated as a township. At the end of 2015, Tiantang Township (Chinese: 天堂乡) and Huanglei Township (Chinese: 黄雷乡) were revoked. Some places merged into the township and then it was upgraded to a town.

== Administrative divisions ==
As of 2015, the town is divided into 24 villages: Linchong (Chinese: 林冲村), Tangjia (Chinese: 塘家村), Liujia (Chinese: 刘家村), Tianba (Chinese: 田坝村), Dabao (Chinese: 大堡村), Shimaping (Chinese: 石马坪村), Douxi (Chinese: 斗溪村), Woman (Chinese: 卧慢村), Banlishan (Chinese: 板栗山村), Dipu (Chinese: 地蒲村), Mawang (Chinese: 马王村), Tangzhai (Chinese: 塘寨村), Guigen (Chinese: 桂根村), Dixi (Chinese: 地习村), Daoding (Chinese: 道丁村), Gaodong (Chinese: 高洞村), Xiaobo (Chinese: 小簸村), Dabang (Chinese: 大榜村), Jiepai (Chinese: 界牌村), Jiaogou (Chinese: 绞沟村), Zhiping (Chinese: 竹坪村), Dawang (Chinese: 大旺村), Tiantang (Chinese: 天堂村), and Songzhai (Chinese: 宋寨村).

== Geography ==
The West Stream (Chinese: 西溪) winds through the town.

The highest point in the town is Mount Zhanbeipo (Chinese: 战北坡) which stands 1,016 metres (3,333 ft) above sea level. The second highest point in the town is Mount Tianzi (Chinese: 天子山), which, at 692 metres (2,270 ft) above sea level.

== Economy ==
The local economy is primarily based upon agriculture and local industry.

== Transportation ==
The G60 Shanghai–Kunming Expressway passes across the town northeast to southwest.

The Shanghai–Kunming high-speed railway is a high-speed railway passes across the town northeast to southwest.
