= Mibei Miao Ethnic Township =

Mibei Miao Ethnic Township 米贝苗族乡
- Ethnic Township
- Location in Hunan
- Coordinates: 27°12′29″N 109°23′15″E
- Country: People's Republic of China
- Province: Hunan
- Prefecture-level city: Huaihua
- Autonomous county: Xinhuang Dong Autonomous County
- Incorporated (township): 1956

Area
  - Total: 101 km^{2} (39 sq mi)
- Elevation: 700 m (2,300 ft)

Population (2015)
  - Total: 14,571
  - Density: 144/km^{2} (374/sq mi)
- Time zone: UTC+08:00 (China Standard)
- Postal code: 419211
- Area code: 0745

Mibei Miao Ethnic Township (simplified Chinese: 米贝苗族乡; traditional Chinese: 米貝苗族鄉; pinyin: Mǐbèi Miáozú Xiāng) is a rural ethnic township in Xinhuang Dong Autonomous County, Hunan, China. As of the 2015 census it had a population of 14,571 and an area of 101-square-kilometre (39 sq mi). It is surrounded by Butouxiang Miao Ethnic Township on the north, Biyong Town of Zhijiang Dong Autonomous County on the west, Zhongzhai Town on the east, and Wengdong Town of Tianzhu County on the south.

== History ==
Prior to 1955, the area was part of Zhijiang Dong Autonomous County. In December 1956, it fell under the jurisdiction of Xinhuang Dong Autonomous County, and Mibei Township was established. In September 1958, it was renamed "Mibei People's Commune." and in June 1984, its name was changed to "Mibei Miao Ethnic Township".

== Geography ==
The highest point in the township is Mount Zhangjiajie (Chinese: 张家界) which stands 1,028 metres (3,373 ft) above sea level. The lowest point is Huaban Stream (Chinese: 滑板溪), which, at 314 metres (1,030 ft) above sea level. The average elevation of the town is 700-metre (2,300 ft) above sea level.

The forest coverage of this town is 76.5%.

There are seven streams in the township. The Zhonghe Stream (Chinese: 中和溪), a tributary of the Qingshui River (Chinese: 清水江), flows through the town west to east.

== Economy ==
The local economy is primarily based upon agriculture and local industry. Wood processing is a major industry.

The streams in the township are clear, rich in catfish, dragonet, Chinese giant salamander and other rare fish species.

The main local specialties of this township are gastrodia elata, eucommia ulmoides, lilium, chestnut, umeboshi, citrus, charcoal, stele stone, phyllostachys edulis, fine bamboo basket, etc.

== Education ==
There are one ordinary middle school, one central primary school and 15 village primary schools in this township.
