= Hetan, Xinhuang =

Hetan 禾滩镇
- Town
- Location in Hunan
- Coordinates: 27°17′08″N 109°14′19″E
- Country: People's Republic of China
- Province: Hunan
- Prefecture-level city: Huaihua
- Autonomous county: Xinhuang Dong Autonomous County
- Designated (town): 2015

Area
  - Total: 160.99 km^{2} (62.16 sq mi)

Population (2015)
  - Total: 17,316
  - Density: 107.56/km^{2} (278.58/sq mi)
- Time zone: UTC+08:00 (China Standard)
- Postal code: 419206
- Area code: 0745

Hetan (simplified Chinese: 禾滩镇; traditional Chinese: 和灘鎮; pinyin: Hétān Zhèn) is a rural town in Xinhuang Dong Autonomous County, Hunan, China. As of the 2015 census it had a population of 17,316 and an area of 160.99 square kilometres (62.16 sq mi). It borders Huangzhou Town in the north, Butouxiang Miao Ethnic Township in the east, Zhongzhai Town in the southeast, and Fuluo Town in the west and southwest.

== History ==
In October 2015, some places of former Dongping Township (Chinese: 洞坪乡) and former Lishu Township (Chinese: 李树乡) merged into Hetan Township to form Hetan Town.

== Geography ==
The highest point in the town is Mount Gunmapo (Chinese: 滚马坡) which stands 916.7 metres (3,008 ft) above sea level.

The Fuluo River (Chinese: 扶罗河) winds through the town.

== Transportation ==
The Provincial Highway S232 passes across the town north to south.
