= Bozhou, Xinhuang =

Bozhou 波洲镇
- Town
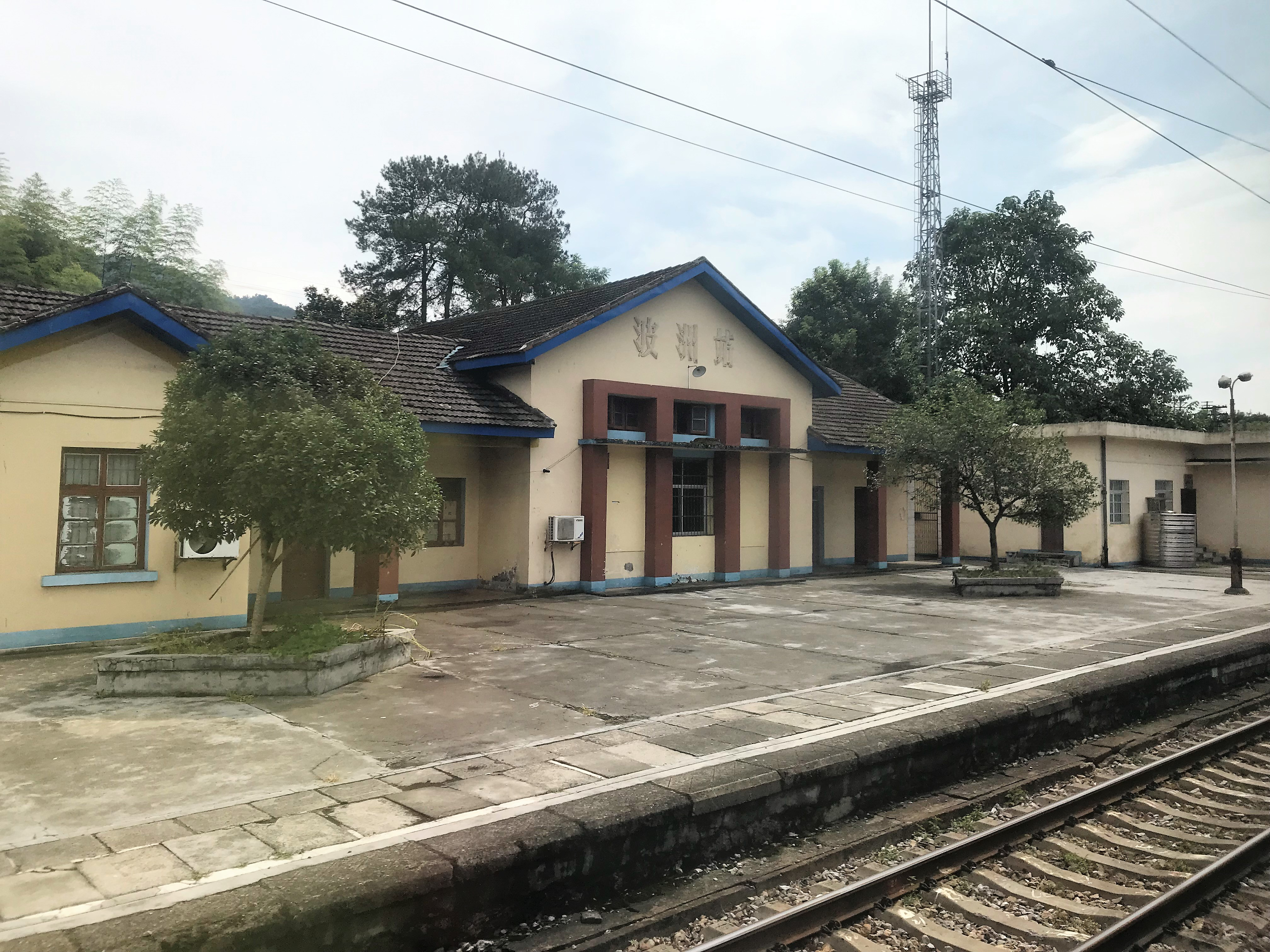
- Bozhou railway station in 2019

- Location in Hunan
- Coordinates: 27°23′04″N 109°17′51″E
- Country: People's Republic of China
- Province: Hunan
- Prefecture-level city: Huaihua
- Autonomous county: Xinhuang Dong Autonomous County
- Incorporated (township): 1956
- Designated (town): 1985

Area
  - Total: 76.82 km^{2} (29.66 sq mi)

Population (2015)
  - Total: 17,253
  - Density: 224.6/km^{2} (581.7/sq mi)
- Time zone: UTC+08:00 (China Standard)
- Postal code: 419202
- Area code: 0745

Bozhou (simplified Chinese: 波洲镇; traditional Chinese: 波洲鎮; pinyin: Bōzhōu Zhèn) is a rural town in Xinhuang Dong Autonomous County, Hunan, China. As of the 2015 census it had a population of 17,253 and an area of 76.82 square kilometres (29.66 sq mi). The town is bordered to the north by Wanshan District of Tongren, to the east by Xindianping Town of Zhijiang Dong Autonomous County, to the southeast by Butouxiang Miao Ethnic Township, to the west by Huangzhou Town, and to the southwest by Hetan Town. It is approximately 15 kilometres (9.3 mi) from the western county seat.

== History ==
During the Republic of China (1912-1949), it was the second largest commercial port in Xinhuang County.

In 1956, the Bozhou Township was established. In December 1985 it was upgraded to a town.

== Geography ==
The highest point in the town is Mount Dadongpo (Chinese: 大洞坡) at 850 metres (2,790 ft) above sea level.

The Wushui River, a left tributary of the Yuan River, flows through the town.

== Transportation ==
The National Highway G320, more commonly known as "G320", is an east–west highway passing through the middle town.

The Shanghai–Kunming high-speed railway is a high-speed railway passes across the town northeast to southwest.
