= Huangzhou Wind-rain Bridge =

Huangzhou Wind-rain Bridge 晃州风雨桥
- Coordinates: 27°22′15″N 109°11′02″E
- Carries: Motor vehicles, pedestrians and bicycles
- Crosses: Wu River
- Locale: Huangzhou, Xinhuang Dong Autonomous County, Hunan, China

Characteristics
- Material: Concrete, steel, wood
- Total length: 220 metres (720 ft)
- Width: 120 metres (390 ft)
- Traversable?: Yes
- Longest span: 240 metres (790 ft)
- Piers in water: 5
- No. of lanes: 2

History
- Designer: Hunan Huaihua Highway Survey and Design Institute; Guizhou Qiandongnan Architectural Design Institute
- Constructed by: Xinhuang Dong Autonomous County Economic Construction Investment Company; Transportation Bureau of Xinhuang Dong Autonomous County; Hunan Railway Engineering Co., Ltd; Hunan Xingda Construction Group Co., Ltd
- Construction start: March 2011
- Construction end: January 2014
- Construction cost: 29.8 million yuan
- Opened: 26 January 2014
- Inaugurated: 26 January 2014

Location
- Interactive map of Huangzhou Wind-rain Bridge

The Huangzhou Wind-rain Bridge (simplified Chinese: 晃州风雨桥; traditional Chinese: 晃州風雨橋; pinyin: Huǎngzhōu Fēngyǔ Qiáo) is a beam bridge over the Wu River in the town of Huangzhou, Xinhuang Dong Autonomous County, Hunan, China. Completed on January 26, 2014, it has a main span of 240 metres (790 ft) and total length of 220 metres (720 ft).

== Name ==
The name of "Huangzhou" named after the town of "Huangzhou", where the bridge located.

== History ==
Construction of the main body began in March 2011 and was completed in June 2013. Construction of the covered bridge began in June 2013 and was completed in January 2014. It costs more than 29.8 million yuan. Two gateways (门楼) and five drum towers (鼓楼) on the bridge. Parapet panels (栏板), railing posts (望柱) and round Baogu stones (抱鼓石) are carved in patterns and shapes representing ancient Chinese sculpturing art. The most representative of the bridge railing carvings include Chinese dragons, Qilin, Fenghuang, and birds.

== Gallery ==
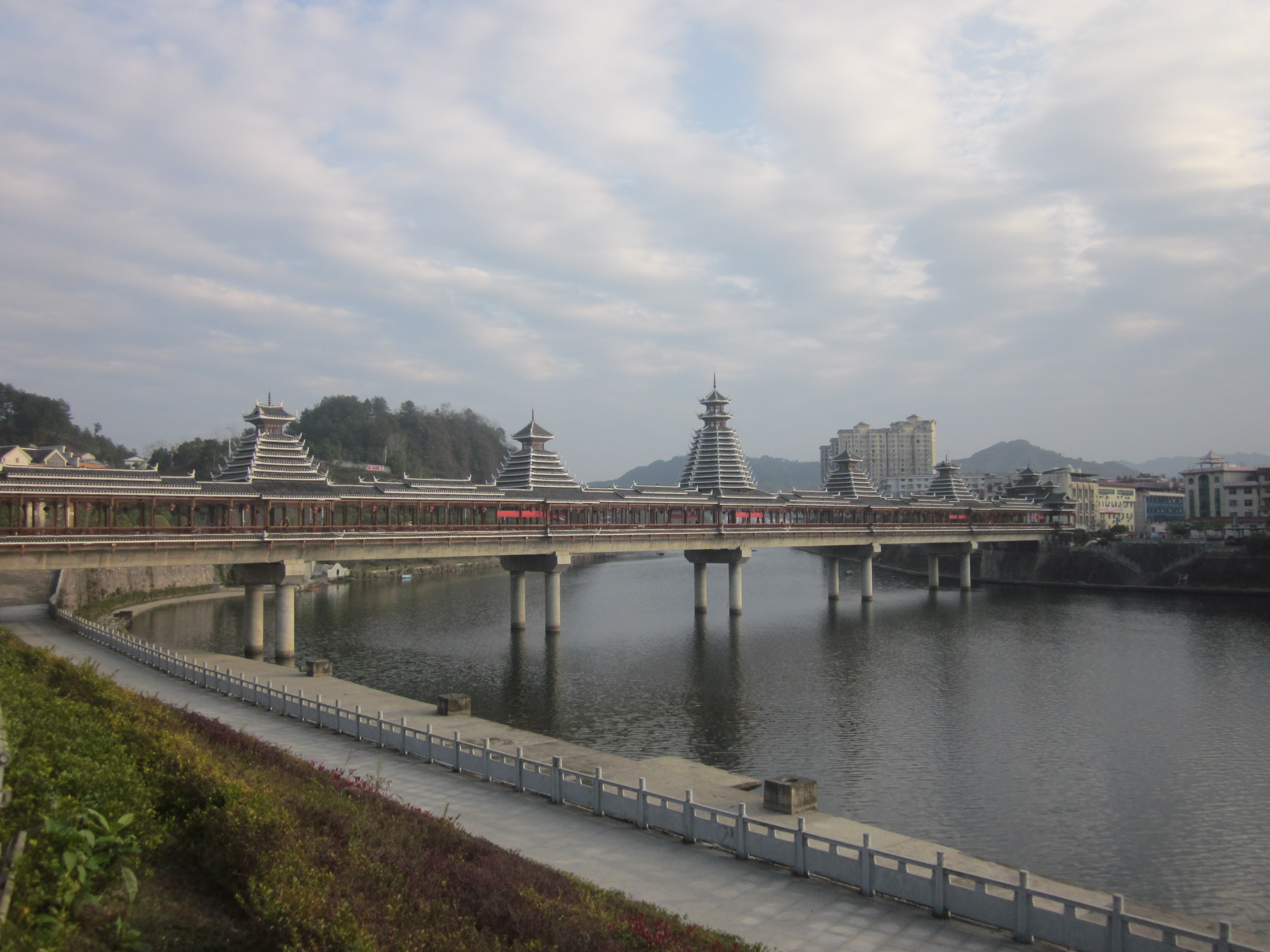
Huangzhou Wind-rain Bridge.

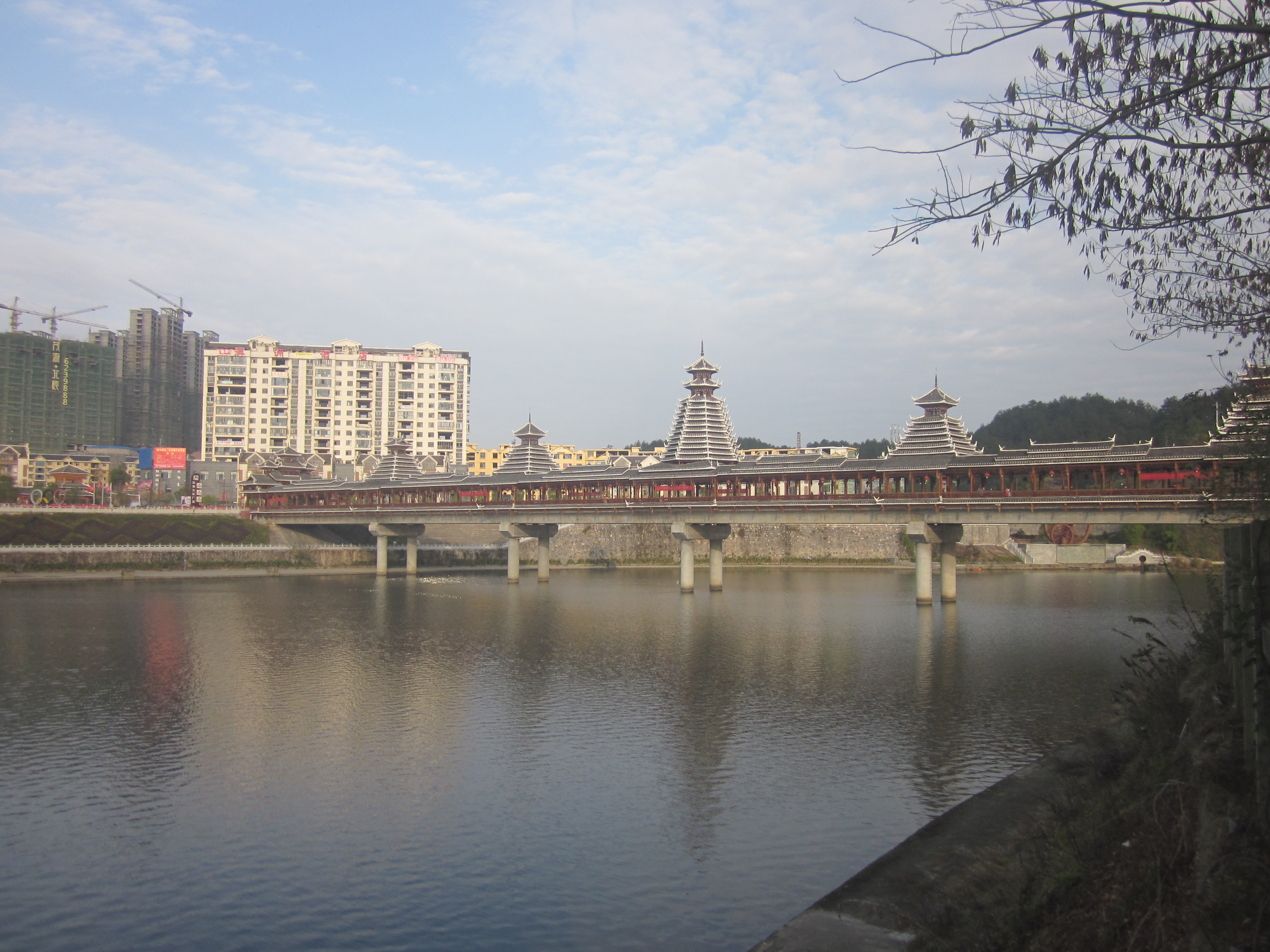
Huangzhou Wind-rain Bridge.

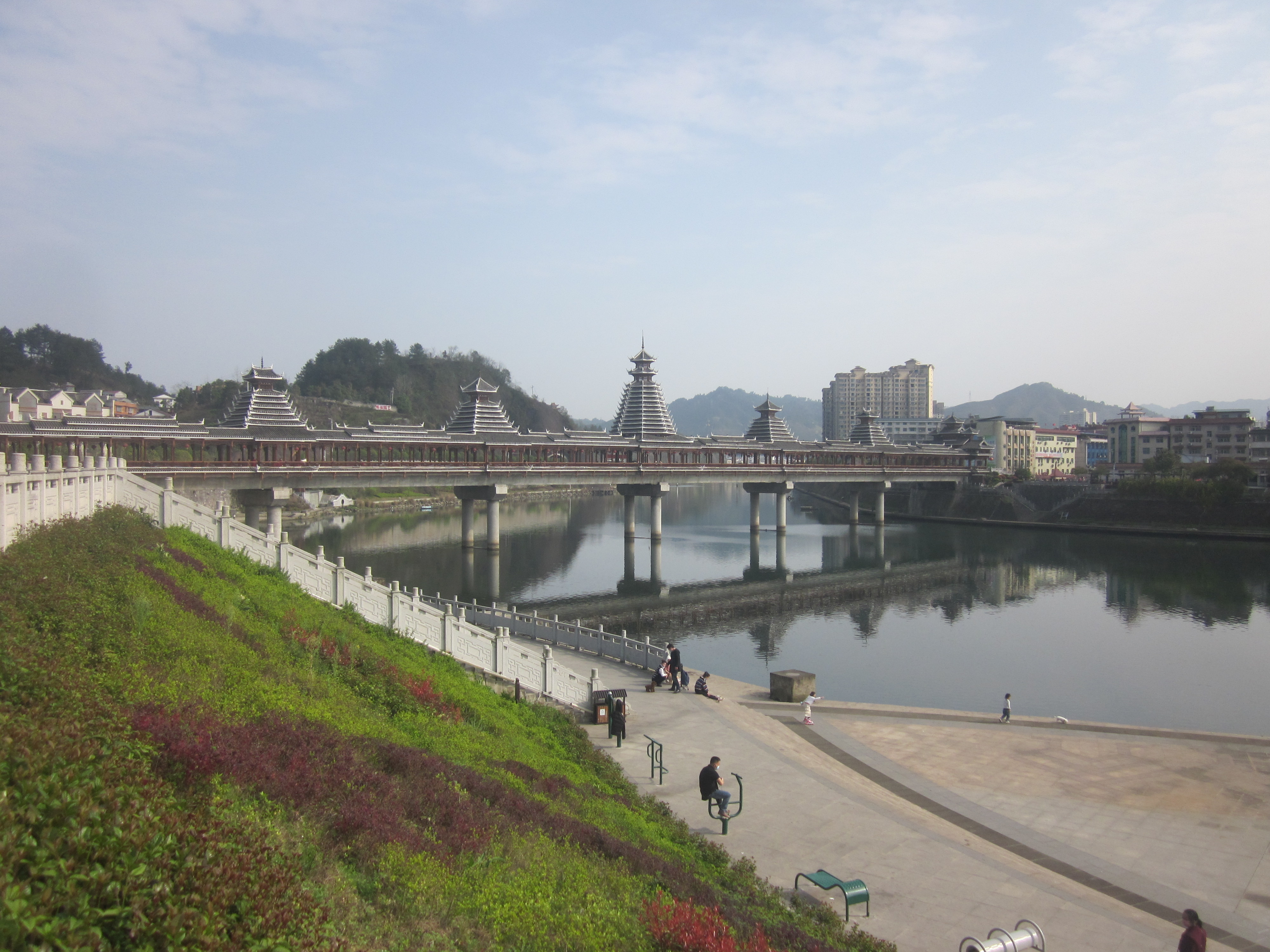
Huangzhou Wind-rain Bridge.
