= Gongxi =

Gongxi 贡溪镇
- Town
- Location in Hunan Gongxi (China)
- Coordinates: 27°07′39″N 109°10′32″E
- Country: People's Republic of China
- Province: Hunan
- Prefecture-level city: Huaihua
- Autonomous county: Xinhuang Dong Autonomous County
- Incorporated (township): 1956
- Designated (town): 2015

Area
  - Total: 69.8 km^{2} (26.9 sq mi)

Population (2015)
  - Total: 13,492
  - Density: 193/km^{2} (501/sq mi)
- Time zone: UTC+08:00 (China Standard)
- Postal code: 419213
- Area code: 0745

Gongxi (simplified Chinese: 贡溪镇; traditional Chinese: 貢溪鎮; pinyin: Gòngxī Zhèn) is a rural town in Xinhuang Dong Autonomous County, Hunan, China. As of the 2015 census it had a population of 13,492 and an area of 69.8 square kilometres (26.9 sq mi). It is surrounded by Fuluo Town on the north, Pingdi Town on the west, Zhuxi Township on the east, and Tianzhu County on the south.

== History ==
After the establishment of the Communist State in 1956, Gongxi Township was set up. In 1961 it was renamed "Gongxi People's Commune". It restored the original name in 1984. In 2015 it was upgraded to a town.

== Geography ==
The highest point in the town is Mount Dragon (Chinese: 龙山) which stands 1,065 metres (3,494 ft) above sea level. The second highest point in the town is Mount Bandengpo (Chinese: 板凳坡), which, at 626 metres (2,054 ft) above sea level.

The Fuluo River (Chinese: 扶罗河) winds through the town.

== Transportation ==
The Provincial Highway S232 passes across the town north to south.
