= Yanlai Temple =

Buddhist temple in Hunan, China

- 燕来寺
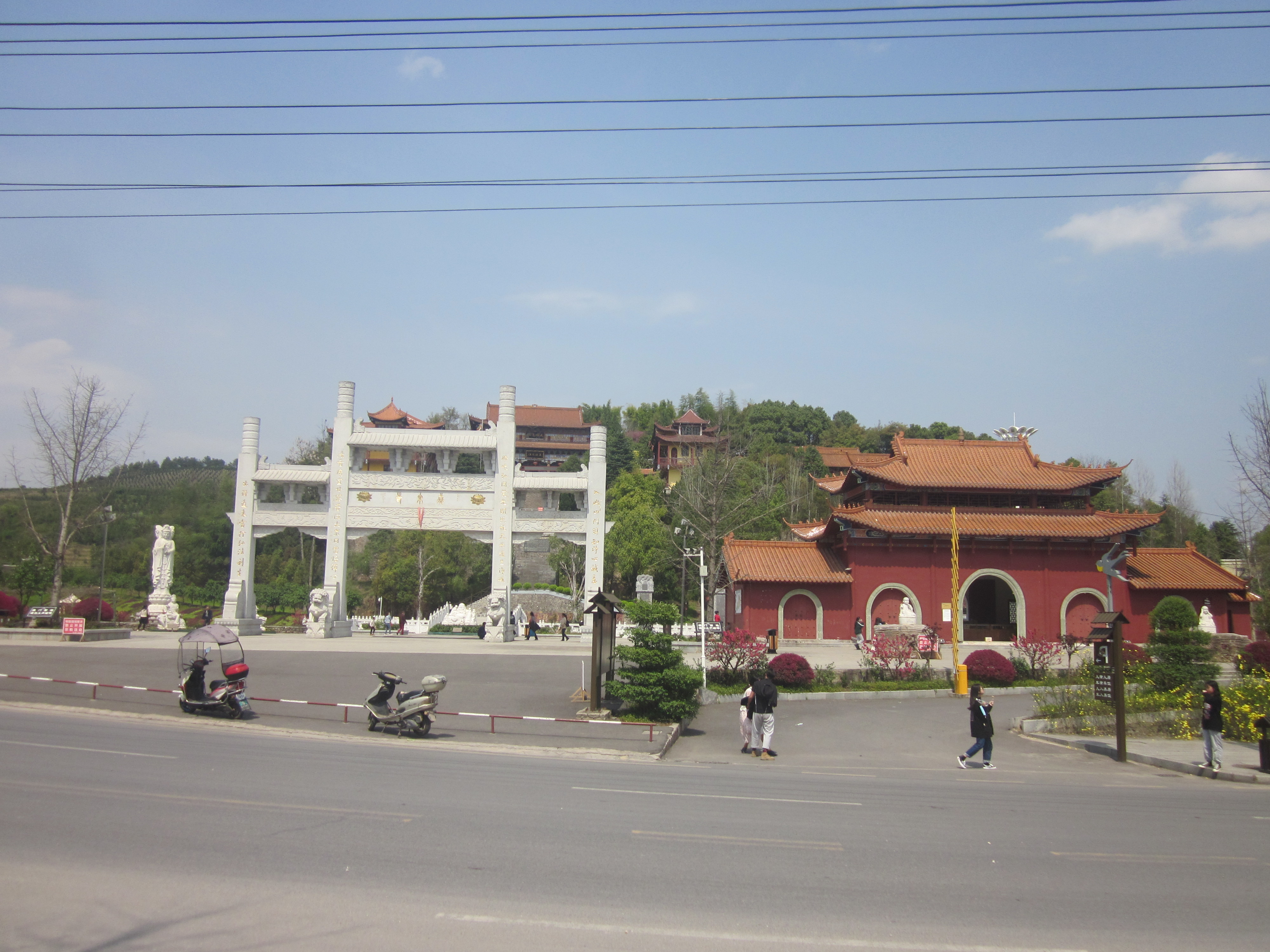
- Frontal view of Yanlai Temple.

- Location within Hunan

Religion
- Affiliation: Buddhism
- Sect: Chan Buddhism

Location
- Location: Huangzhou, Xinhuang Dong Autonomous County, Hunan
- Country: China
- Interactive map of Yanlai Temple
- Coordinates: 27°22′57″N 109°10′52″E

Architecture
- Style: Chinese architecture
- Founder: Shi Yandao
- Groundbreaking: 2002

Yanlai Temple (simplified Chinese: 燕来寺; traditional Chinese: 燕來寺; pinyin: Yànlái Sì) is a Buddhist temple located on Mount Yingpan in Huangzhou Town of Xinhuang Dong Autonomous County, Hunan, China.

== History ==
In February 2002, Bhikkhunī Shi Yandao (释演道) came to Mount Yingpan (营盘山) and choose here as the temple address.

== Architecture ==
The complex include the following halls: Shanmen, Mahavira Hall, Hall of Four Heavenly Kings, Hall of Guanyin, Hall of Kshitigarbha, Hall of Sangharama Palace, Hall of Five Hundred Arhats, Bell tower, Drum tower, Hall of Guru, Dharma Hall, Buddhist Texts Library, Dining Room, etc.

The lawn in front of the temple has stones shaped in lifelike arhats of different size in different postures of sitting, lying, sleeping, running and jumping.

== Gallery ==
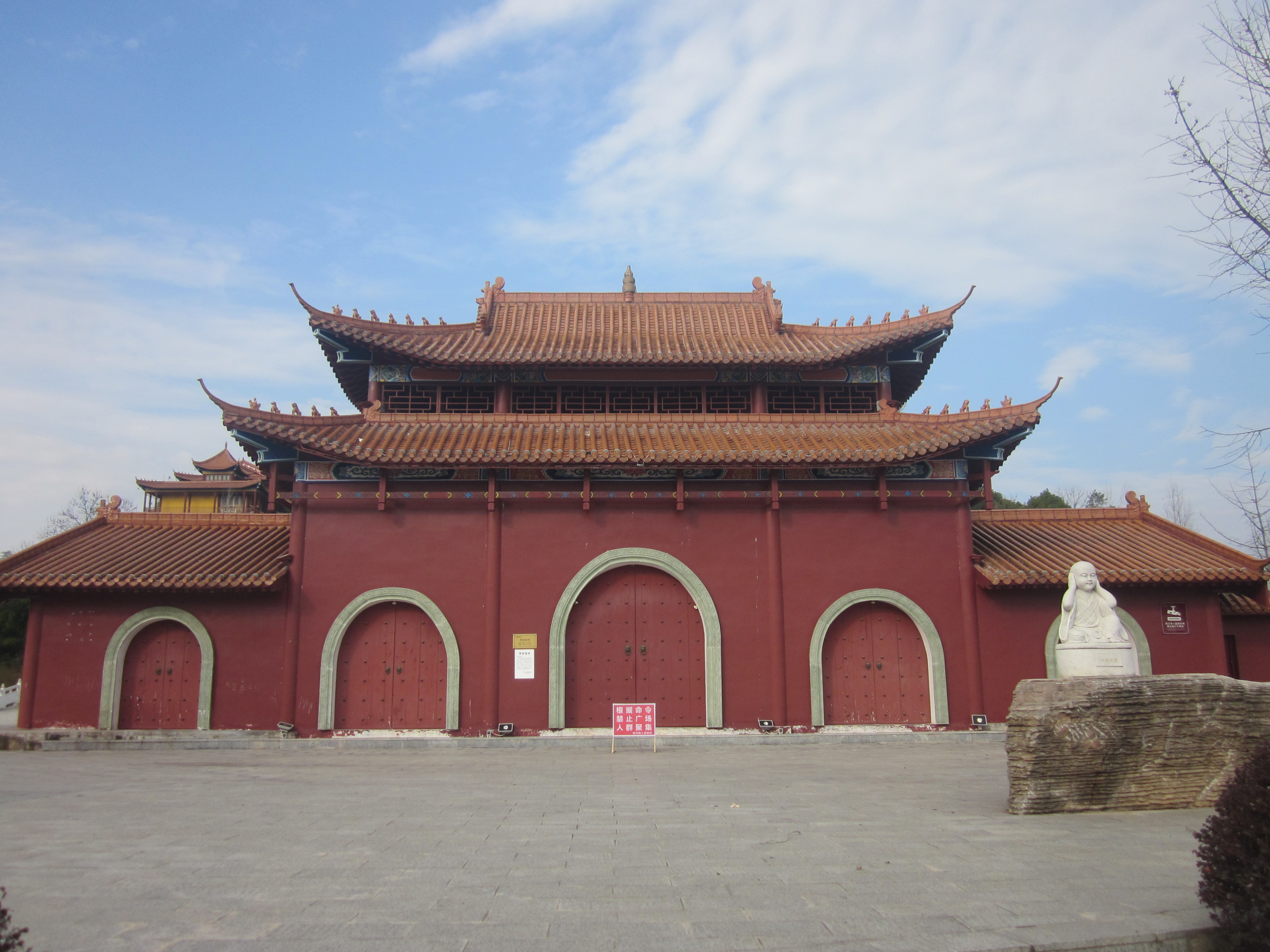
Shanmen.

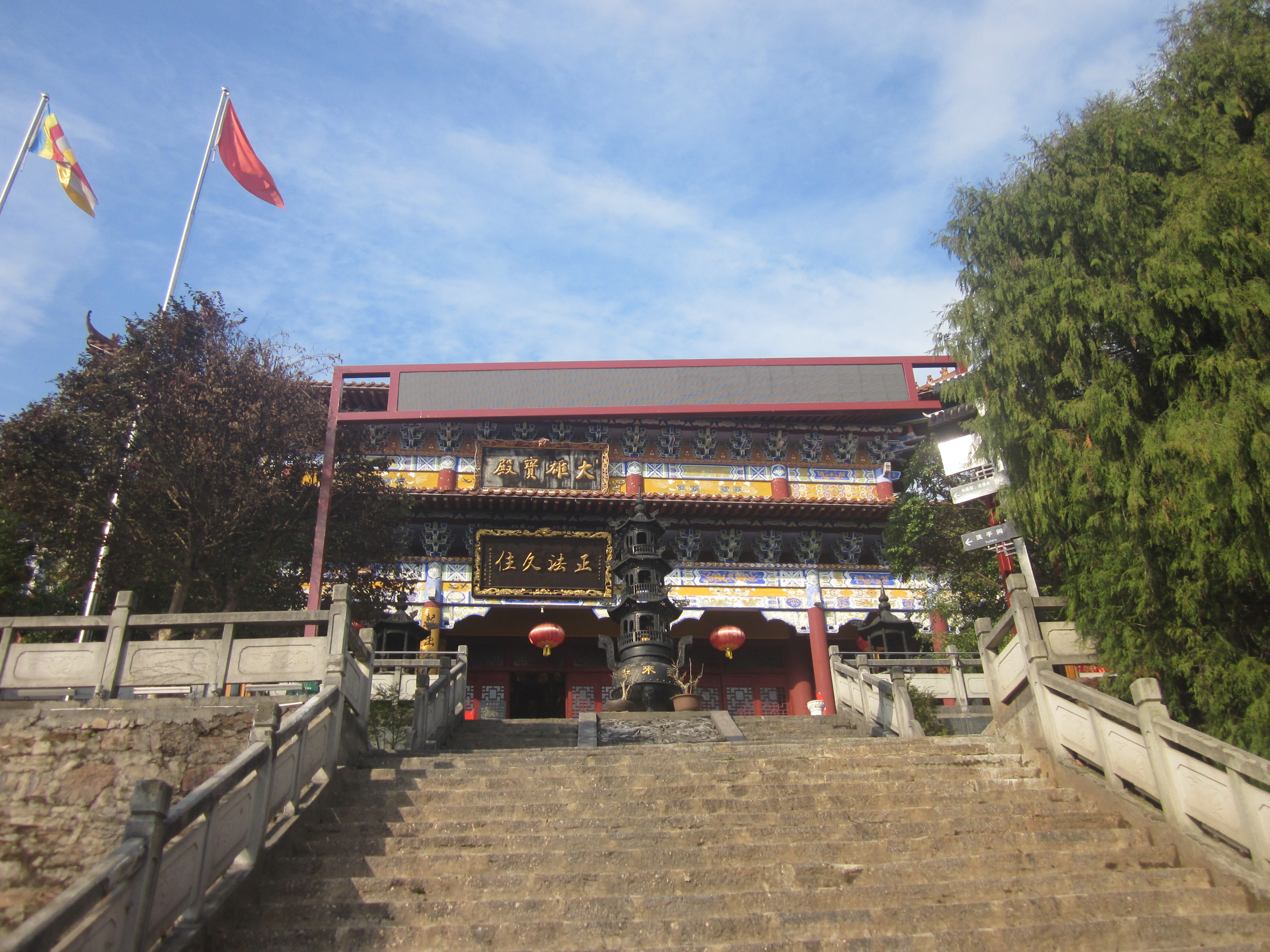
Mahavira Hall.

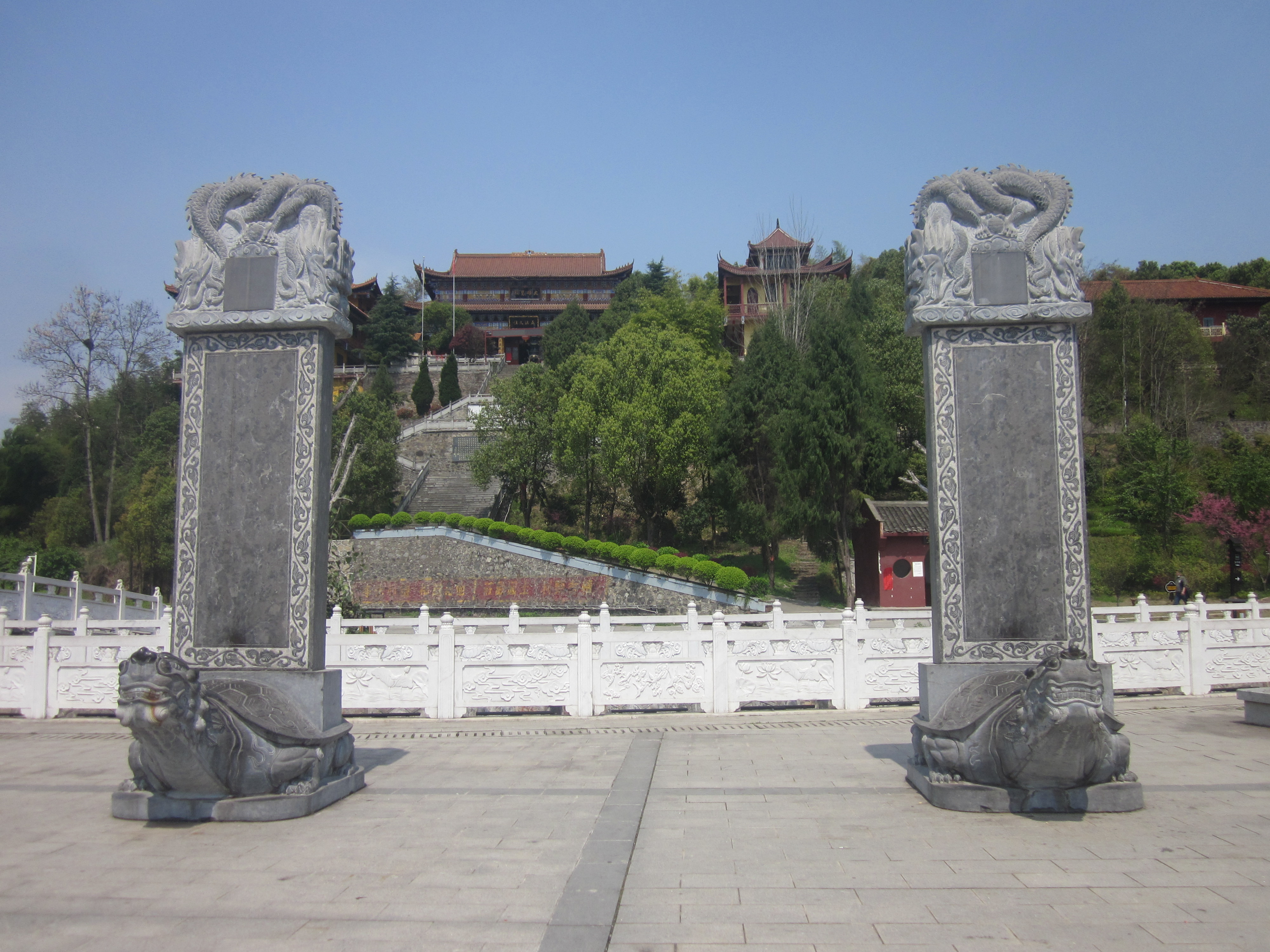
Bixi.

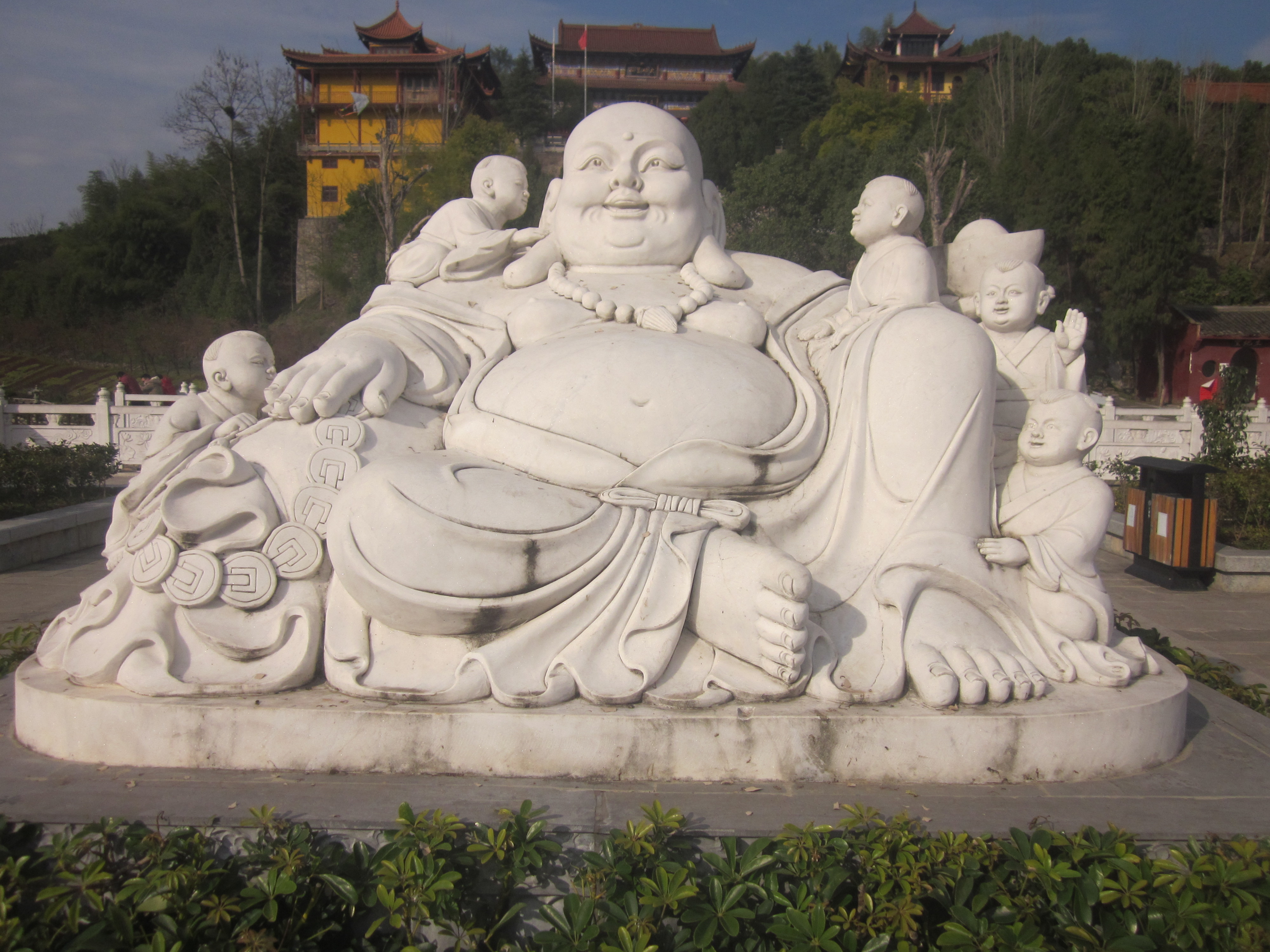
Statue of Maitreya.

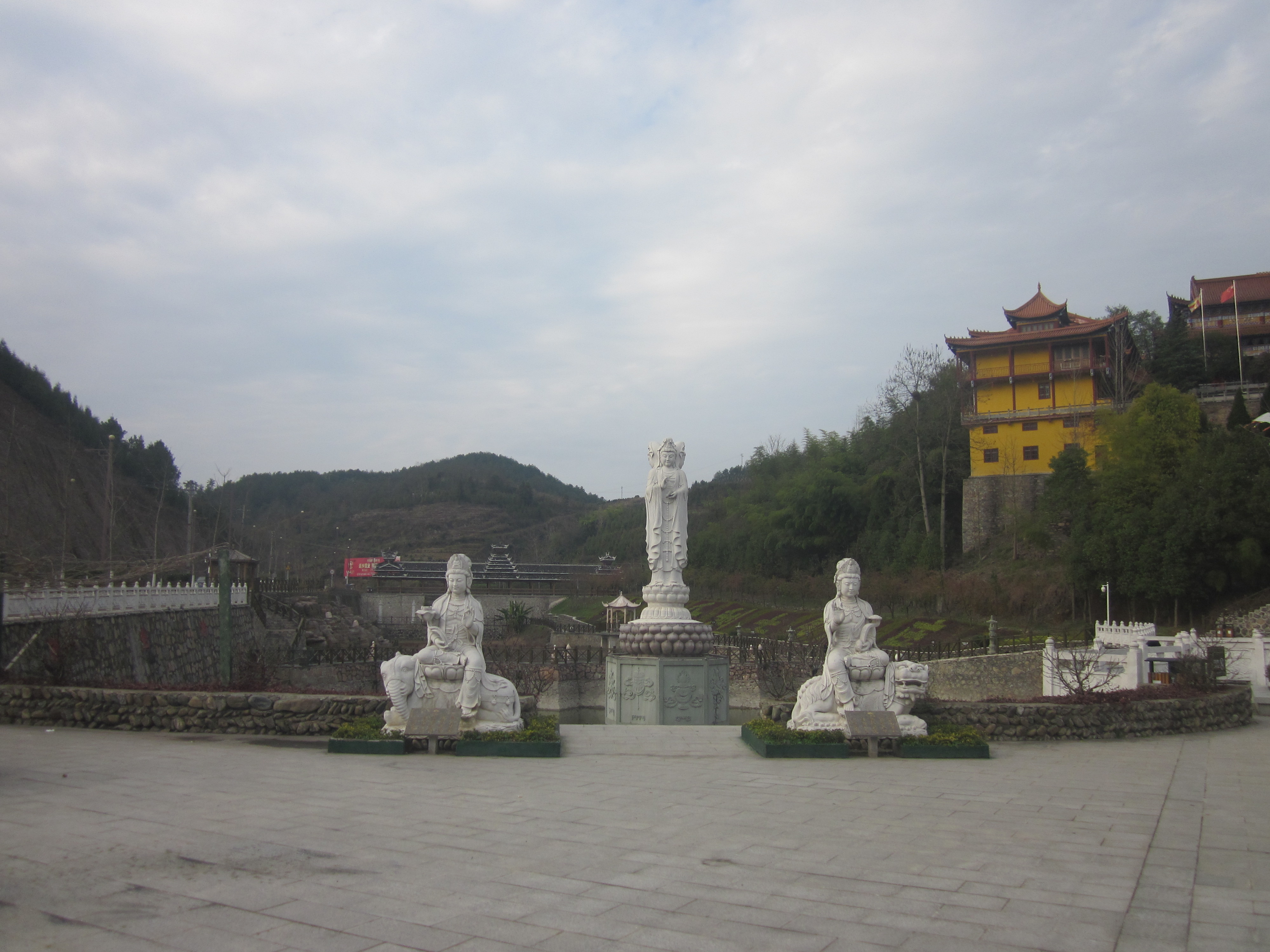
Statues of Guanyin, Manjushri and Samantabhadra.

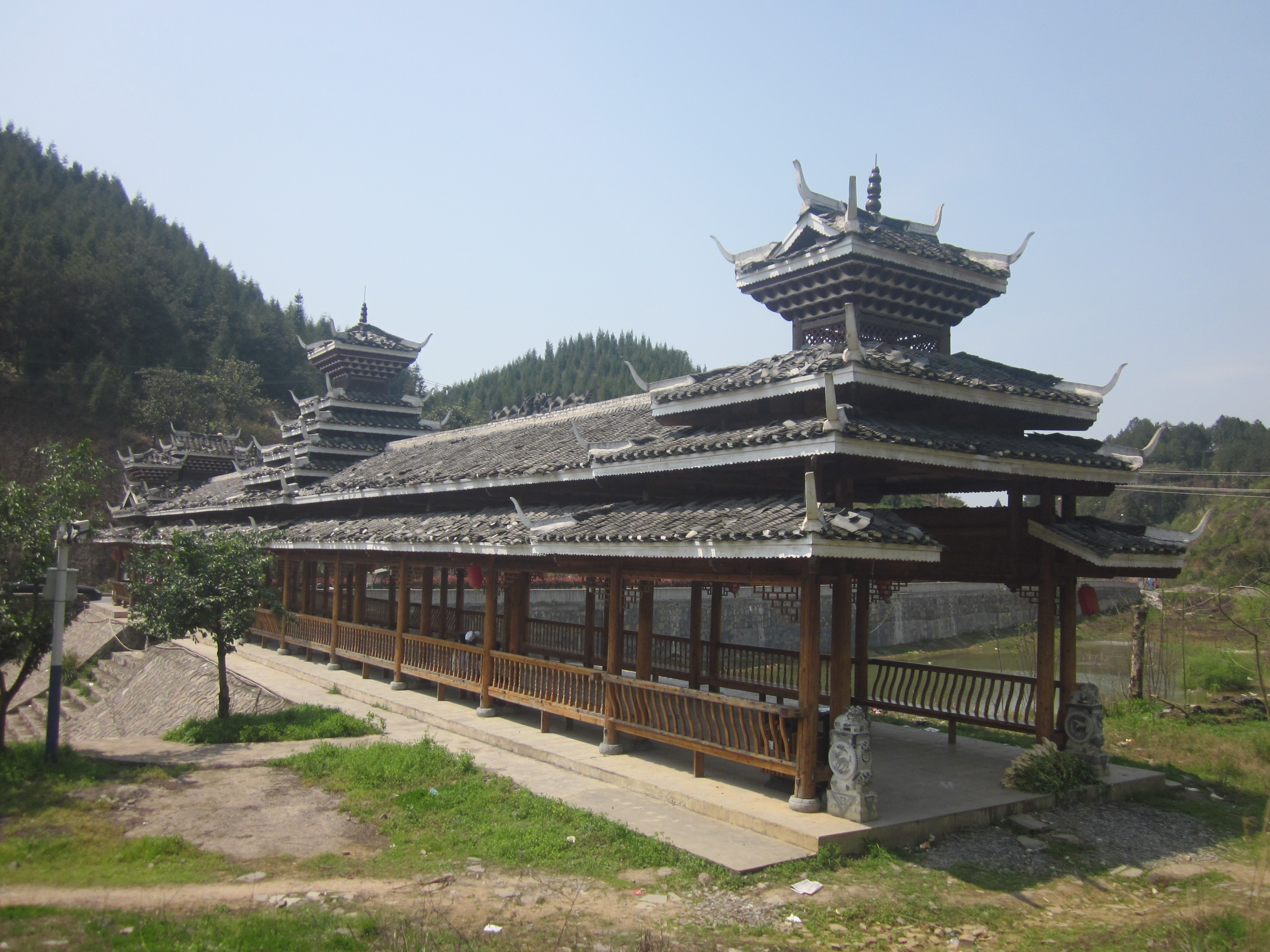
Wind-rain Bridge.
