= Wanshan =

Wanshan may refer to:

- Wanshan Archipelago, in Guangdong, China
- Wanshan District, in Guizhou, China
- Wanshan Special Vehicle, a manufacturer of trucks in China.
