= Sansui =

Sansui may refer to:

- Sansui County, in Guizhou, China
- Sansui Electric, Japanese manufacturer of audio and video equipment
- Shan shui, 山水 in Chinese, mountain water, landscape scene
- Sansui, 山水 in Japanese, landscape paintings
