= Wu River (Yuan River, north) =

Wu River Wuyang River (㵲阳河)
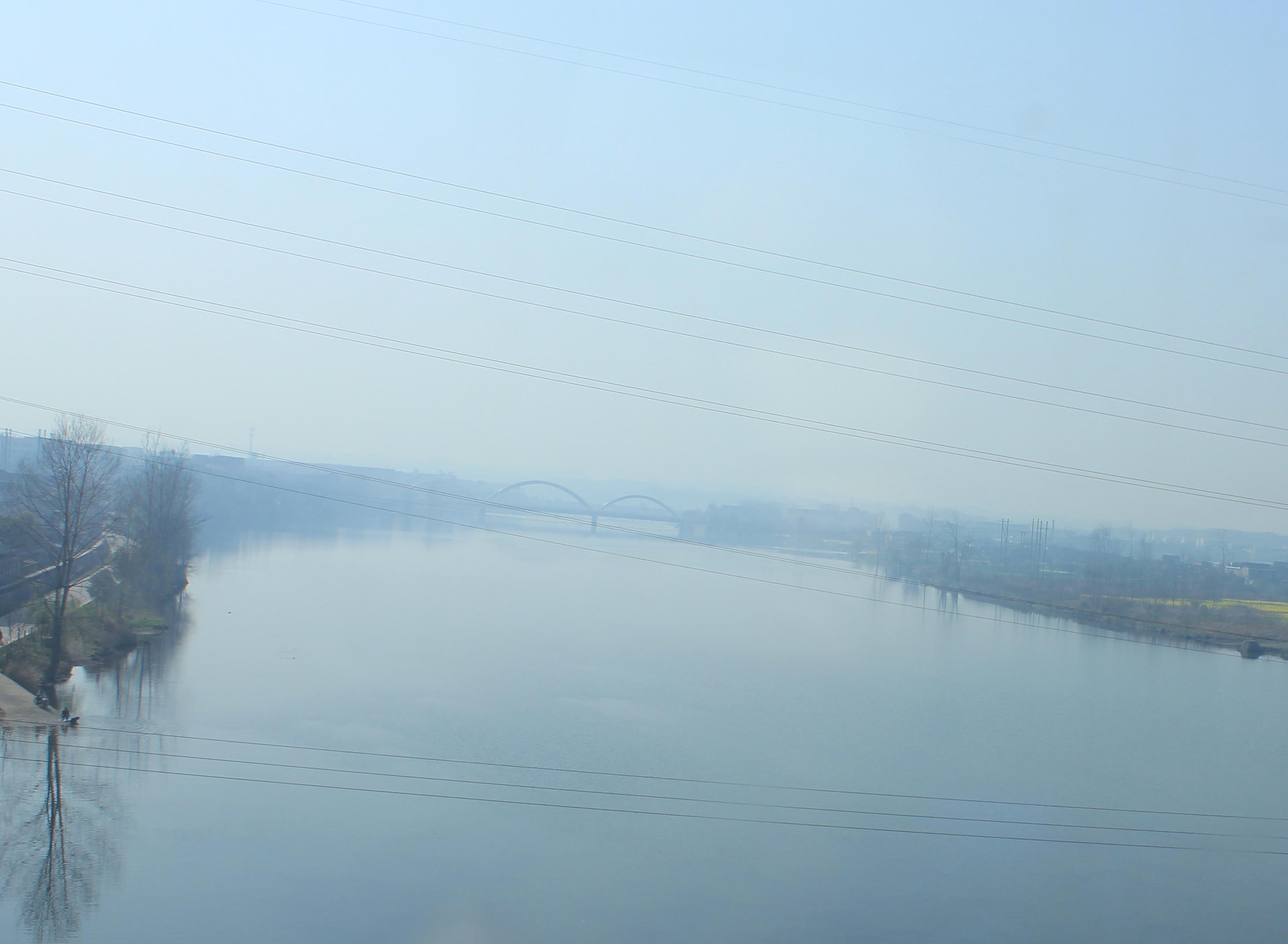
- Wushui River in Zhijiang County，Hunan
- Native name: 㵲水 (Chinese)

Location
- Country: China
- State: Guizhou, Hunan
- Cities: Shibing County, Zhenyuan County, Yuping Dong Autonomous County, Xinhuang Dong Autonomous County, Zhijiang Dong Autonomous County, Huaihua, Zhongfang County, Hongjiang

Physical characteristics
- Source: Mount Foding
  - location: Languan Township，Weng'an County, Guizhou Province
- Mouth: Yuan River
  - location: Hongjiang, Hunan Province
  - coordinates: 27°11′25″N 109°48′43″E
- Length: 444 km (276 mi)
- Basin size: 10,334 km^{2} (3,990 sq mi)
- Discharge
  - average: 180 m^{3}/s (6,400 cu ft/s)

Basin features
- River system: Yuan River
- Tributaries
  - left: Longjiang River, Cheba River
  - right: Liuzhai River
- Encyclopedia of rivers and lakes in China Section of Changjiang basin. Beijing: China WaterPower Press. 2010. ISBN 978-7-5084-6512-8.

The Wu River (Chinese: 㵲水or潕水; pinyin: Wǔ Shuǐ) is a left tributary of the Yuan River in south China. This upper stream is called Wuyang River (Chinese: 㵲阳河; pinyin: Wǔyáng Hé) in Guizhou Province; it rises on the western slopes of Mount Foding in the southeast of Weng'an County. The river runs eastward into Hunan Province and then is called the Wu River. It joins Yuan River at Hongjiang City. The river has a length of 444 kilometres (276 mi) and drains an area of 10,334 square kilometres (3,990 mi^{2}).
