= Cheba River =

River in China

Cheba River (Chinese: 车坝河) is a river of China. A tributary of the Yangtze River, it has a total length of 79 kilometres (49 mi), and a basin area of 1,060 square kilometres (410 sq mi). It has an average annual flow of 17 cubic meters per second.
