= Sansui County =

Sansui County 三穗县
- County
- Location of the seat in Guizhou Sansui (Southwest China)
- Coordinates (Sansui government): 26°57′11″N 108°40′31″E
- Country: China
- Province: Guizhou
- Autonomous prefecture: Qiandongnan
- County seat: Bagong

Area
  - Total: 1,035.8 km^{2} (399.9 sq mi)

Population (2010)
  - Total: 155,671
  - Density: 150.29/km^{2} (389.25/sq mi)
- Time zone: UTC+8 (China Standard)
- Postal code: 556500
- Area code: 0855

Sansui County (simplified Chinese: 三穗县; traditional Chinese: 三穗縣; pinyin: Sānsuì Xiàn) is a county in eastern Guizhou province, China, bordering Hunan province to the east. It is under the administration of the Qiandongnan Miao and Dong Autonomous Prefecture and is one of the province's eastern gateways.

== Administrative divisions ==
Sansui County is divided into seven towns and two townships:

=== Towns ===
- Bagong 八弓镇
- Tailie 台烈镇
- Wazhai 瓦寨镇
- Tonglin 桐林镇
- Xuedong 雪洞镇
- Changji 长吉镇
- Liangshang 良上镇

=== Townships ===
- Gunma 滚马乡
- Kuanchang 款场乡

== Geography and climate ==
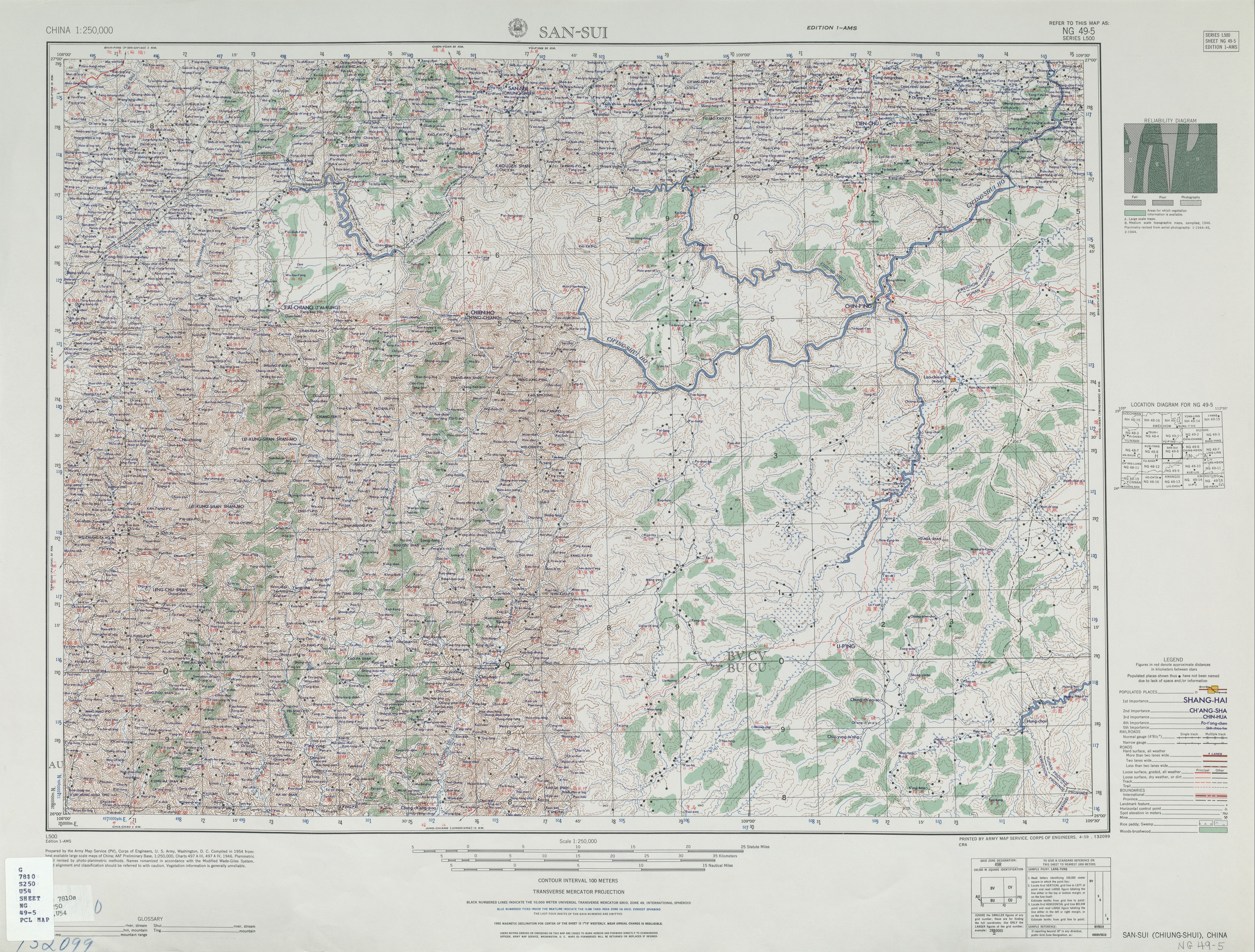
Map including Sansui (labeled as SAN-SUI (CHIUNG-SHUI) 三穗 (邛水)) (AMS, 1954)

Sansui County is located in the east of Guizhou and the northeast of Qiandongnan Prefecture 247 kilometres (153 mi) away from the provincial capital of Guiyang and 87 kilometres (54 mi) away from the prefecture seat of Kaili. It ranges in latitude from 26° 47' to 27° 04' N and in longitude from 108° 32' to 109° 04' E, spanning a total area of 1,035.8 square kilometres (399.9 sq mi). Bordering counties are Xinhuang (Hunan) to the northeast, Tianzhu and Jianhe to the southeast and southwest, and Zhenyuan to the north. The county is part of the Yuan River watershed, and there is a total of 776 kilometres (482 mi) of rivers within its borders.

Sansui has a monsoon-influenced humid subtropical climate (Köppen Cfa), with chilly, damp winters, and hot, humid summers. The monthly daily average temperature ranges from 3.9 °C (39.0 °F) in January to 25.5 °C (77.9 °F) in July, while the annual mean is 15.4 °C (59.7 °F). More than half of the annual rainfall occurs from May to August, while the annual frost-free period typically lasts 290 to 300 days.

Climate data for Sansui, elevation 630 m (2,070 ft), (1991–2020 normals, extremes 1971–present)
Month	Jan	Feb	Mar	Apr	May	Jun	Jul	Aug	Sep	Oct	Nov	Dec	Year
Record high °C (°F)	24.7 (76.5)	31.0 (87.8)	34.0 (93.2)	34.4 (93.9)	35.8 (96.4)	35.5 (95.9)	36.7 (98.1)	38.6 (101.5)	36.1 (97.0)	34.0 (93.2)	30.3 (86.5)	25.2 (77.4)	38.6 (101.5)
Mean daily maximum °C (°F)	7.4 (45.3)	10.4 (50.7)	15.0 (59.0)	21.1 (70.0)	25.0 (77.0)	27.8 (82.0)	30.6 (87.1)	30.4 (86.7)	26.6 (79.9)	20.8 (69.4)	16.0 (60.8)	10.1 (50.2)	20.1 (68.2)
Daily mean °C (°F)	3.9 (39.0)	6.3 (43.3)	10.3 (50.5)	15.9 (60.6)	20.0 (68.0)	23.3 (73.9)	25.5 (77.9)	24.8 (76.6)	21.2 (70.2)	16.1 (61.0)	11.1 (52.0)	6.0 (42.8)	15.4 (59.7)
Mean daily minimum °C (°F)	1.7 (35.1)	3.6 (38.5)	7.3 (45.1)	12.4 (54.3)	16.5 (61.7)	20.2 (68.4)	21.8 (71.2)	21.1 (70.0)	17.6 (63.7)	13.1 (55.6)	8.1 (46.6)	3.2 (37.8)	12.2 (54.0)
Record low °C (°F)	−13.1 (8.4)	−10.6 (12.9)	−3.7 (25.3)	0.5 (32.9)	5.0 (41.0)	11.6 (52.9)	12.8 (55.0)	14.2 (57.6)	6.8 (44.2)	1.6 (34.9)	−2.5 (27.5)	−6.3 (20.7)	−13.1 (8.4)
Average precipitation mm (inches)	36.7 (1.44)	37.9 (1.49)	77.1 (3.04)	113.0 (4.45)	161.8 (6.37)	176.3 (6.94)	152.5 (6.00)	127.6 (5.02)	85.6 (3.37)	82.9 (3.26)	54.0 (2.13)	32.2 (1.27)	1,137.6 (44.78)
Average precipitation days (≥ 0.1 mm)	14.4	13.7	17.6	16.8	17.4	16.0	13.1	12.7	11.5	13.4	11.6	11.6	169.8
Average snowy days	5.4	3.3	0.8	0	0	0	0	0	0	0	0.2	2.0	11.7
Average relative humidity (%)	82	82	83	82	82	83	80	81	82	84	83	80	82
Mean monthly sunshine hours	37.5	46.0	64.3	91.3	108.7	103.4	175.8	174.6	120.6	86.5	79.5	59.4	1,147.6
Percentage possible sunshine	11	15	17	24	26	25	42	44	33	24	25	18	25
Source 1: China Meteorological Administration all-time extreme temperature all-time May record high
Source 2: Weather China

== Transportation ==
The county has one railway station, Sansui railway station.

The Three Arch Bridge (Longting Bridge) collapsed on 8 August 2024.
