= Zhongzhai, Hunan =

Zhongzhai 中寨镇
- Town
- Location in Hunan
- Coordinates: 27°12′04″N 109°16′29″E
- Country: People's Republic of China
- Province: Hunan
- Prefecture-level city: Huaihua
- Autonomous county: Xinhuang Dong Autonomous County
- Incorporated (township): 1956
- Designated (town): 1984

Area
  - Total: 133.9 km^{2} (51.7 sq mi)

Population (2015)
  - Total: 16,130
  - Density: 120.5/km^{2} (312.0/sq mi)
- Time zone: UTC+08:00 (China Standard)
- Postal code: 419209
- Area code: 0745

Zhongzhai (simplified Chinese: 中寨镇; traditional Chinese: 中寨鎮; pinyin: Zhōngzhài Zhèn) is a rural town in Xinhuang Dong Autonomous County, Hunan, China. As of the 2015 census it had a population of 16,130 and an area of 133.9 square kilometres (51.7 sq mi). It borders Hetan Town in the north, Mibei Miao Ethnic Township in the east, Fuluo Town in the west, and Zhuxi Township in the south.

== History ==
During the Qing dynasty (1644–1911), it was known as "Zhonghe City" (Chinese: 中和市). After the founding of the Communist State in 1951, the People's Government of the 6th District was established. In July 1956, the Zhongzhai Township was set up. In December 1984 it was upgraded to a town. In December 2015, some parts of the Bilang Township (Chinese: 碧朗乡) and Lishu Township (Chinese: 李树乡) were incorporated into the town.

== Geography ==
The Zhonghe Stream (Chinese: 中和溪) winds through the town.

== Economy ==
The local economy is primarily based upon agriculture and local industry. The main native products are wood, tobacco and medicinal materials. The main cash crops are potatoes.

== Attractions ==
The Wind-rain Bridge (Chinese: 风雨桥) is a famous scenic spot in the town and Xinhuang Dong Autonomous County. It was rebuilt in 2003. The Wind-rain Bridge is the symbolized cultural landscape and architecture of the Dong people. It has a deep connotation of culture, philosophy and architecture art, it also contains plenty of ecological aesthetic implications.
