= Wanshan, Tongren =

Wanshan 万山区
- District
- Location of the seat in Guizhou Wanshan (Southwest China)
- Coordinates (Wanshan Central Square): 27°31′06″N 109°12′42″E
- Country: China
- Province: Guizhou
- Prefecture-level city: Tongren
- District seat: Xieqiao

Area
  - Total: 338 km^{2} (131 sq mi)

Population (2010)
  - Total: 47,844
  - Density: 142/km^{2} (367/sq mi)
- Time zone: UTC+8 (China Standard)
- Postal code: 554200

Wanshan District (simplified Chinese: 万山区; traditional Chinese: 萬山區; pinyin: Wànshān Qū) is a district of the city of Tongren, Guizhou province, China, bordering Hunan province to the southeast and east. Wanshan was known as Wanshan Special District (万山特区) until November 2011, when it was renamed Wanshan District. The district has an area of 338 square kilometres (131 sq mi) and in 2002 had a population of 60,000.

== Administrative divisions ==
Wanshan District is divided into 4 subdistricts, 1 town and 6 ethnic townships:

subdistricts

- Xieqiao Subdistrict 谢桥街道
- Chadian Subdistrict 茶店街道
- Renshan Subdistrict 仁山街道
- Dandu Subdistrict 丹都街道

towns

- Wanshan Town 万山镇

ethnic townships

- Gaolouping Dong Ethnic Township 高楼坪侗族乡
- Huangdao Dong Ethnic Township 黄道侗族乡
- Aozhai Dong Ethnic Township 敖寨侗族乡
- Xiaxi Dong Ethnic Township 下溪侗族乡
- Yutang Dong and Miao Ethnic Township 鱼塘侗族苗族乡
- Daping Dong, Tujia and Miao Ethnic Township 大坪侗族土家族苗族乡

== Climate ==
Climate data for Wanshan, elevation 884 m (2,900 ft), (1991–2020 normals, extremes 1981–2010)
| Month | Jan | Feb | Mar | Apr | May | Jun | Jul | Aug | Sep | Oct | Nov | Dec | Year |
|---|---|---|---|---|---|---|---|---|---|---|---|---|---|
| Record high °C (°F) | 21.9 (71.4) | 27.4 (81.3) | 31.3 (88.3) | 31.0 (87.8) | 31.7 (89.1) | 33.3 (91.9) | 34.3 (93.7) | 34.2 (93.6) | 33.9 (93.0) | 30.6 (87.1) | 28.3 (82.9) | 21.0 (69.8) | 34.3 (93.7) |
| Mean daily maximum °C (°F) | 4.8 (40.6) | 7.5 (45.5) | 12.0 (53.6) | 18.2 (64.8) | 22.2 (72.0) | 25.0 (77.0) | 27.8 (82.0) | 27.8 (82.0) | 24.0 (75.2) | 18.3 (64.9) | 13.4 (56.1) | 7.5 (45.5) | 17.4 (63.3) |
| Daily mean °C (°F) | 2.1 (35.8) | 4.4 (39.9) | 8.5 (47.3) | 14.3 (57.7) | 18.5 (65.3) | 21.6 (70.9) | 24.2 (75.6) | 23.8 (74.8) | 20.2 (68.4) | 14.9 (58.8) | 10.1 (50.2) | 4.6 (40.3) | 13.9 (57.1) |
| Mean daily minimum °C (°F) | 0.4 (32.7) | 2.4 (36.3) | 6.1 (43.0) | 11.5 (52.7) | 15.8 (60.4) | 19.3 (66.7) | 21.6 (70.9) | 21.1 (70.0) | 17.6 (63.7) | 12.6 (54.7) | 7.8 (46.0) | 2.6 (36.7) | 11.6 (52.8) |
| Record low °C (°F) | −8.0 (17.6) | −7.4 (18.7) | −4.3 (24.3) | 0.4 (32.7) | 6.5 (43.7) | 10.9 (51.6) | 14.4 (57.9) | 13.6 (56.5) | 8.4 (47.1) | 1.5 (34.7) | −5.6 (21.9) | −8.2 (17.2) | −8.2 (17.2) |
| Average precipitation mm (inches) | 55.0 (2.17) | 60.6 (2.39) | 102.5 (4.04) | 132.7 (5.22) | 206.9 (8.15) | 229.7 (9.04) | 213.7 (8.41) | 132.3 (5.21) | 99.1 (3.90) | 100.6 (3.96) | 74.7 (2.94) | 47.0 (1.85) | 1,454.8 (57.28) |
| Average precipitation days (≥ 0.1 mm) | 15.2 | 15.3 | 19.0 | 18.5 | 19.3 | 17.5 | 14.2 | 12.5 | 11.8 | 15.0 | 13.2 | 13.2 | 184.7 |
| Average snowy days | 6.6 | 4.4 | 0.9 | 0.1 | 0 | 0 | 0 | 0 | 0 | 0 | 0.3 | 3.0 | 15.3 |
| Average relative humidity (%) | 82 | 83 | 84 | 83 | 83 | 87 | 84 | 82 | 81 | 81 | 79 | 77 | 82 |
| Mean monthly sunshine hours | 46.7 | 45.0 | 62.9 | 89.5 | 106.3 | 99.5 | 170.1 | 176.3 | 127.1 | 92.3 | 88.1 | 70.8 | 1,174.6 |
| Percentage possible sunshine | 14 | 14 | 17 | 23 | 25 | 24 | 40 | 44 | 35 | 26 | 27 | 22 | 26 |
Source: China Meteorological Administration
