= Huangzhou, Xinhuang =

Huangzhou 晃州镇
- Town
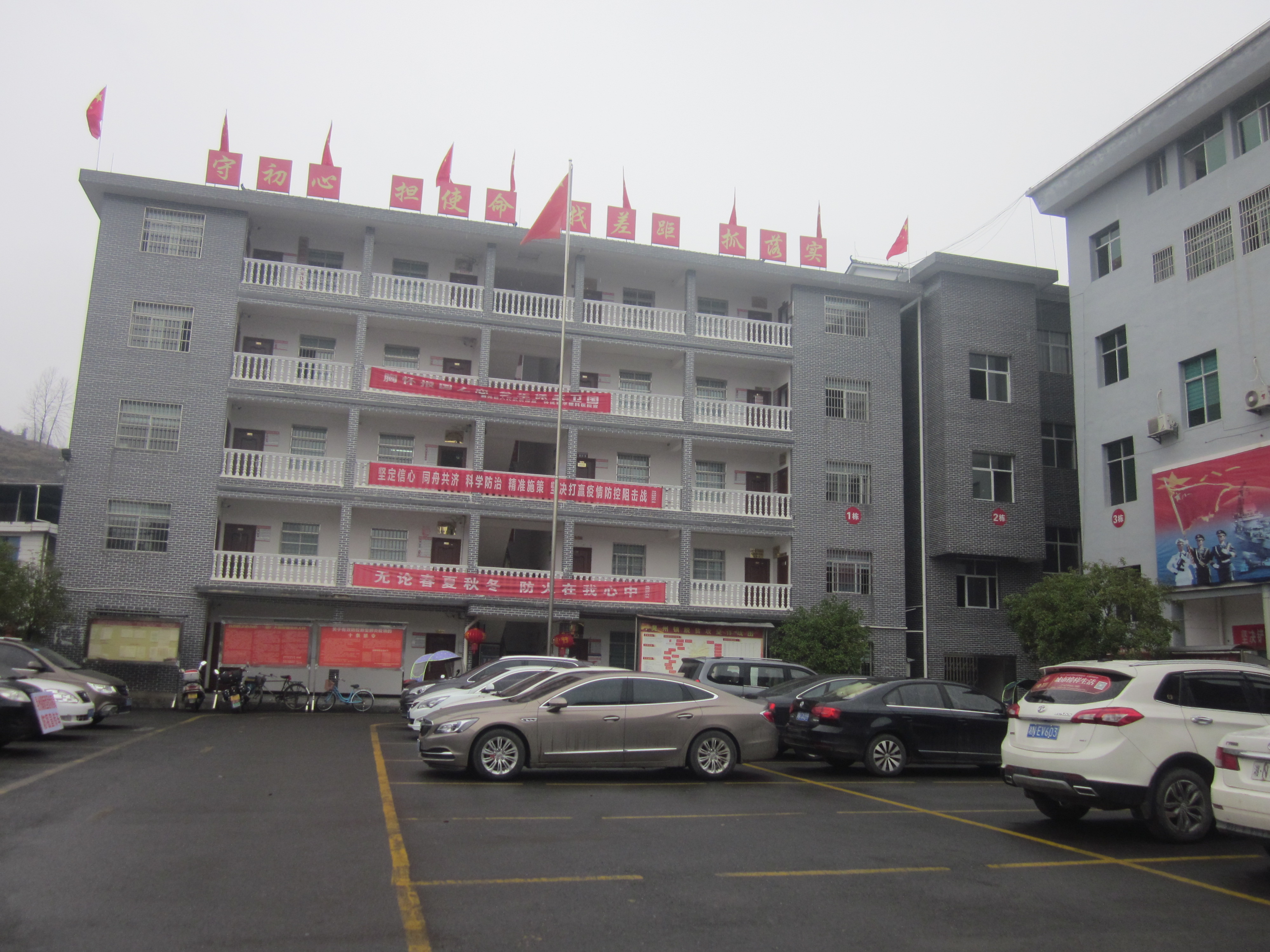
- Government Building of Huangzhou Town.

- Location in Hunan
- Coordinates: 27°22′33″N 109°10′23″E
- Country: People's Republic of China
- Province: Hunan
- Prefecture-level city: Huaihua
- Autonomous county: Xinhuang Dong Autonomous County
- Designated (town): 2015

Area
  - Total: 203.17 km^{2} (78.44 sq mi)

Population (2015)
  - Total: 75,600
  - Density: 372/km^{2} (964/sq mi)
- Time zone: UTC+08:00 (China Standard)
- Postal code: 419299
- Area code: 0745

Huangzhou (simplified Chinese: 晃州镇; traditional Chinese: 晃州鎮; pinyin: Huǎngzhōu Zhèn) is an urban town and the county seat of Xinhuang Dong Autonomous County in Hunan, China. As of the 2015 census it had a population of 75,600 and an area of 203.17 square kilometres (78.44 sq mi). The seat of local government is at Dadongping Village (大洞坪村).

== History ==
The town is located in the northwest of the county, it was reformed to merge Xinlong Town (兴隆镇), Fangjiatun Township (方家屯乡), Dawanluo Township (大湾罗乡) and the Huangzhou Town on November 19, 2015. The seat of local government is at Dadongping Village (大洞坪村).

== Administrative divisions ==
As of 2015, the town is divided into seven communities and 56 villages.

== Geography ==
The Wushui River (潕水) winds through the town.

There are two reservoirs in the town, namely the Yangjia'ao Reservoir (杨家坳水库) and Banxi Reservoir (半溪水库).

There are a number of popular mountains located immediately adjacent to the townsite which include Mount Lengfengpo (冷风坡; 663 metres (2,175 ft)); Mount Wanbao (万宝山; 636 metres (2,087 ft)); and Mount Gunmapo (滚马坡; 916.7 metres (3,008 ft)).

== Economy ==
The local economy is primarily based upon agriculture and local industry.

== Transport ==
The town is connected to three highways: the G60 Shanghai–Kunming Expressway and National Highway G320, both head east to Zhijiang Dong Autonomous County and west to Yuping Dong Autonomous County. And the Provincial Highway S232 passes across the town north to south.

The Shanghai–Kunming high-speed railway is a high-speed railway passes across the town northeast to southwest.
