= Yuping Dong Autonomous County =

Yuping County 玉屏县 Yü-p'ing
- Autonomous county
- 玉屏侗族自治县; Yuping Dong Autonomous County
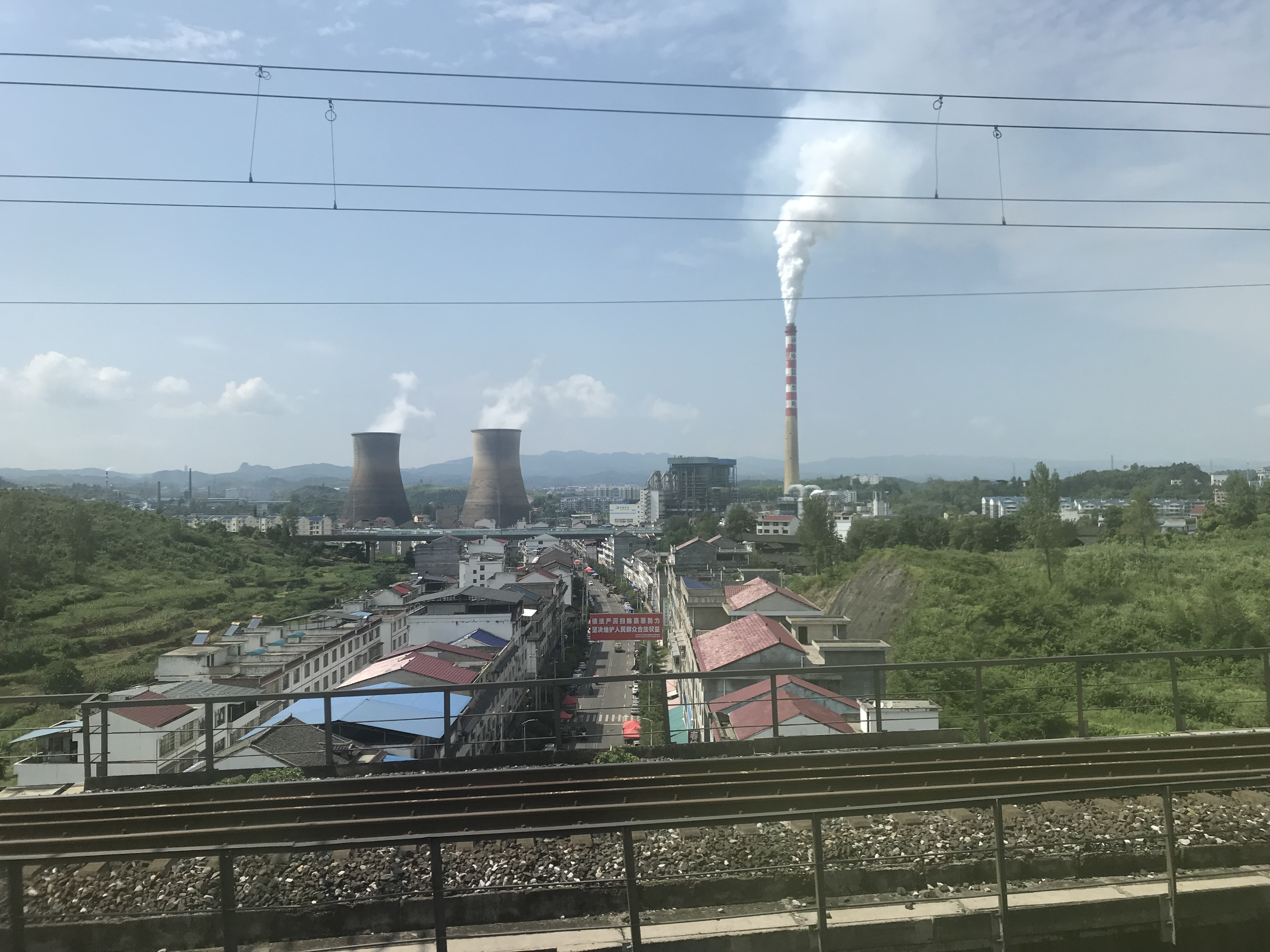

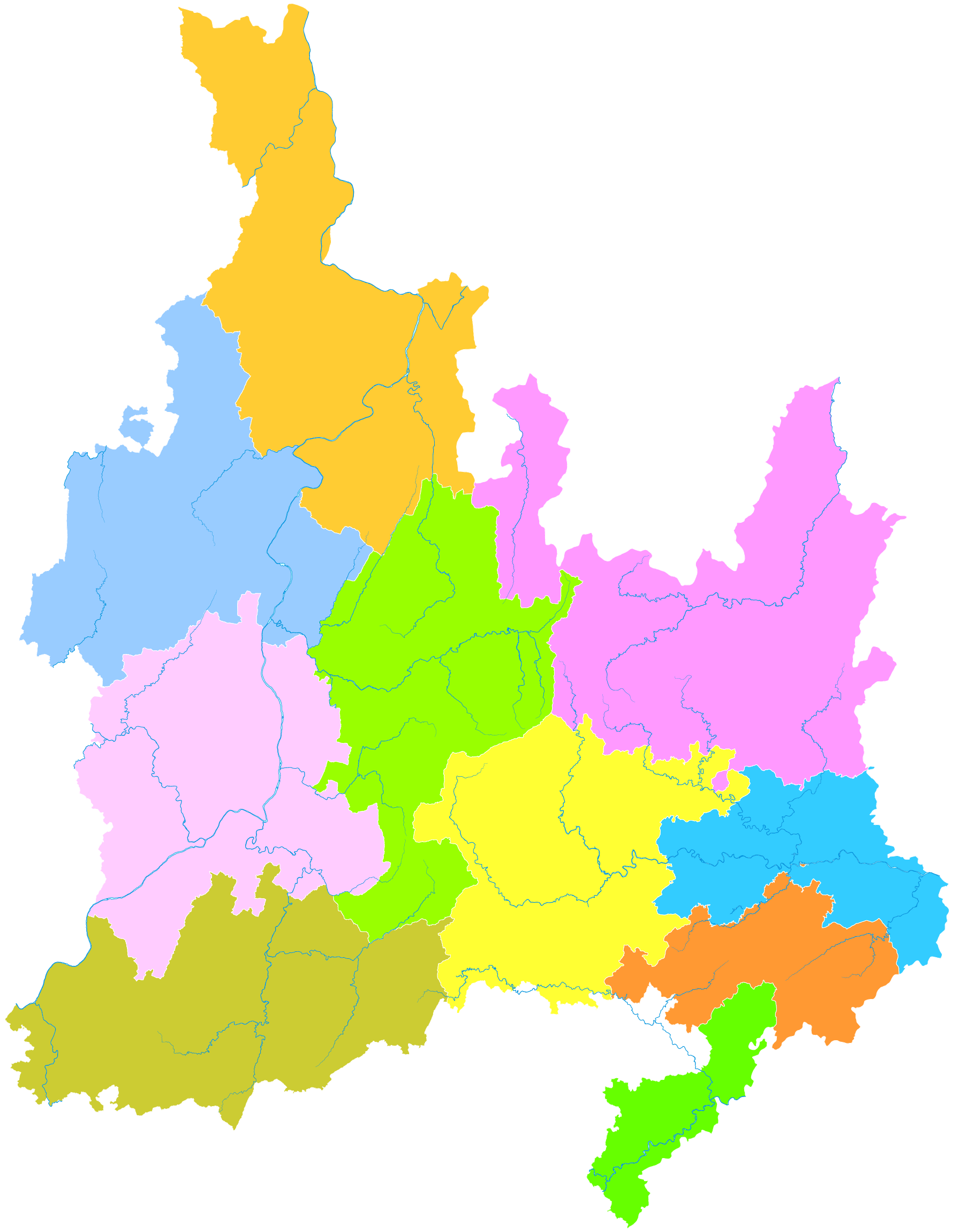
- Yuping is the southernmost division in this map of Tongren

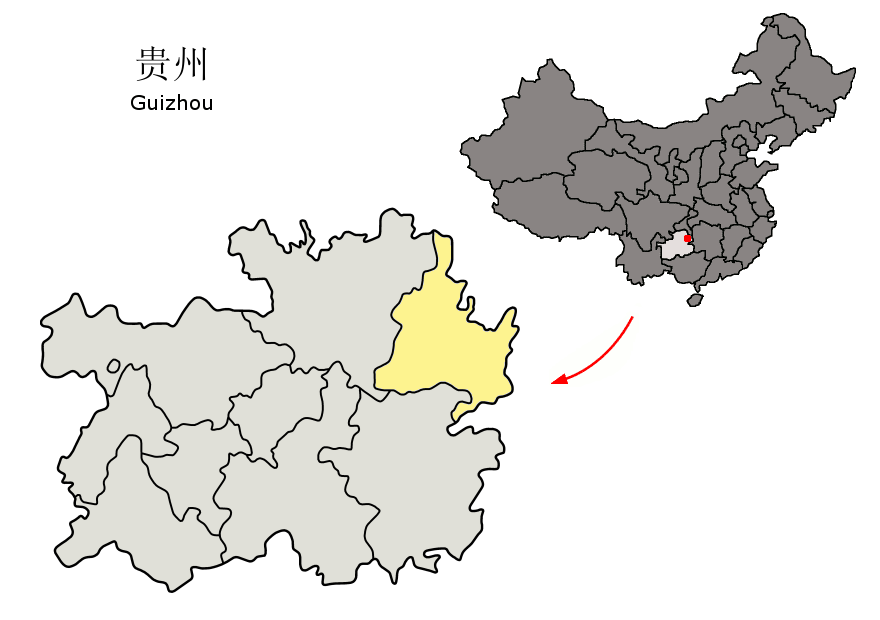
- Tongren in Guizhou

- Location within Guizhou Location within Southwest China
- Coordinates: 27°14′09″N 108°54′23″E
- Country: China
- Province: Guizhou
- Prefecture-level city: Tongren
- County seat: Zaojiaoping Subdistrict

Area
  - Total: 516 km^{2} (199 sq mi)

Population (2020 census)
  - Total: 150,457
  - Density: 292/km^{2} (755/sq mi)
- Time zone: UTC+8 (China Standard)
- Website: www.yuping.gov.cn

Yuping Dong Autonomous County (Chinese: 玉屏侗族自治县; pinyin: Yùpíng dòngzú Zìzhìxiàn) (Dong language: Yuil piinc) is an autonomous county under the administration of the prefecture-level city of Tongren, in the east of Guizhou Province, China, bordering Hunan Province to the southeast.

The county produces a special instrument "Yuping Flute" (玉屏箫笛).

== Administrative divisions ==
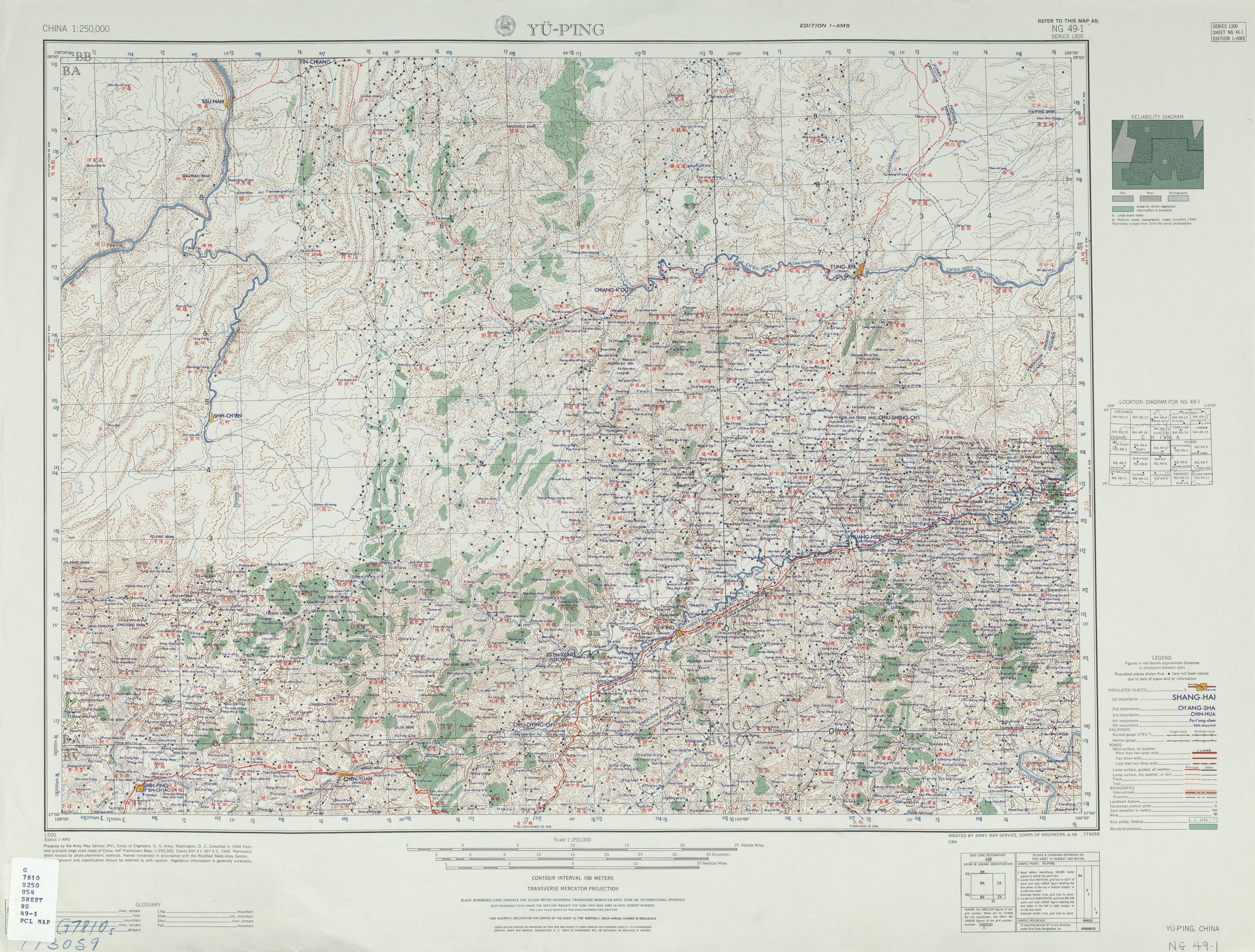
Map including Yuping (labeled as YÜ-P'ING (Walled) 玉屏) (AMS, 1954)

Yuping is divided into 4 subdistricts, 3 towns and 1 townships:

- Pingxi Subdistrict (平溪街道)
- Zaojiaoping Subdistrict (皂角坪街道)
- Mayintang Subdistrict (麻音塘街道)
- Dalong Subdistrict (大龙街道)
- Zhujiachang Town (朱家场镇)
- Tianping Town (田坪镇)
- Xindian Town (新店镇)
- Yayu Township (亚鱼乡)

== Climate ==
Climate data for Yuping, elevation 395 m (1,296 ft), (1991–2020 normals, extremes 1981–2022)
Month	Jan	Feb	Mar	Apr	May	Jun	Jul	Aug	Sep	Oct	Nov	Dec	Year
Record high °C (°F)	26.7 (80.1)	32.2 (90.0)	36.5 (97.7)	36.7 (98.1)	37.5 (99.5)	37.8 (100.0)	38.9 (102.0)	39.7 (103.5)	38.8 (101.8)	37.5 (99.5)	32.4 (90.3)	24.0 (75.2)	39.7 (103.5)
Mean daily maximum °C (°F)	8.7 (47.7)	11.8 (53.2)	16.3 (61.3)	22.7 (72.9)	26.6 (79.9)	29.5 (85.1)	32.5 (90.5)	32.4 (90.3)	28.5 (83.3)	22.4 (72.3)	17.2 (63.0)	11.3 (52.3)	21.7 (71.0)
Daily mean °C (°F)	5.4 (41.7)	7.7 (45.9)	11.7 (53.1)	17.3 (63.1)	21.4 (70.5)	24.7 (76.5)	27.2 (81.0)	26.7 (80.1)	23.0 (73.4)	17.7 (63.9)	12.6 (54.7)	7.4 (45.3)	16.9 (62.4)
Mean daily minimum °C (°F)	3.2 (37.8)	5.2 (41.4)	8.7 (47.7)	13.7 (56.7)	17.8 (64.0)	21.5 (70.7)	23.4 (74.1)	22.9 (73.2)	19.5 (67.1)	14.7 (58.5)	9.7 (49.5)	4.9 (40.8)	13.8 (56.8)
Record low °C (°F)	−4.4 (24.1)	−4.1 (24.6)	−1.0 (30.2)	3.5 (38.3)	7.8 (46.0)	13.1 (55.6)	15.8 (60.4)	16.0 (60.8)	12.3 (54.1)	2.3 (36.1)	−1.0 (30.2)	−3.5 (25.7)	−4.4 (24.1)
Average precipitation mm (inches)	45.1 (1.78)	45.7 (1.80)	84.5 (3.33)	123.3 (4.85)	176.4 (6.94)	189.7 (7.47)	166.8 (6.57)	115.5 (4.55)	85.6 (3.37)	90.8 (3.57)	59.9 (2.36)	38.1 (1.50)	1,221.4 (48.09)
Average precipitation days (≥ 0.1 mm)	13.7	13.4	17.5	16.7	17.4	16.2	13.4	12.1	10.0	13.5	11.1	11.1	166.1
Average snowy days	4.6	2.5	0.5	0	0	0	0	0	0	0	0	1.7	9.3
Average relative humidity (%)	80	79	80	79	80	82	78	78	78	81	80	78	79
Mean monthly sunshine hours	36.4	45.1	62.6	88.4	105.1	102.2	171.5	174.4	125.2	84.4	73.7	57.4	1,126.4
Percentage possible sunshine	11	14	17	23	25	25	41	43	34	24	23	18	25
Source: China Meteorological Administration all-time October provincial record high
