= Tianzhu County, Guizhou =

Tianzhu County 天柱县
- County
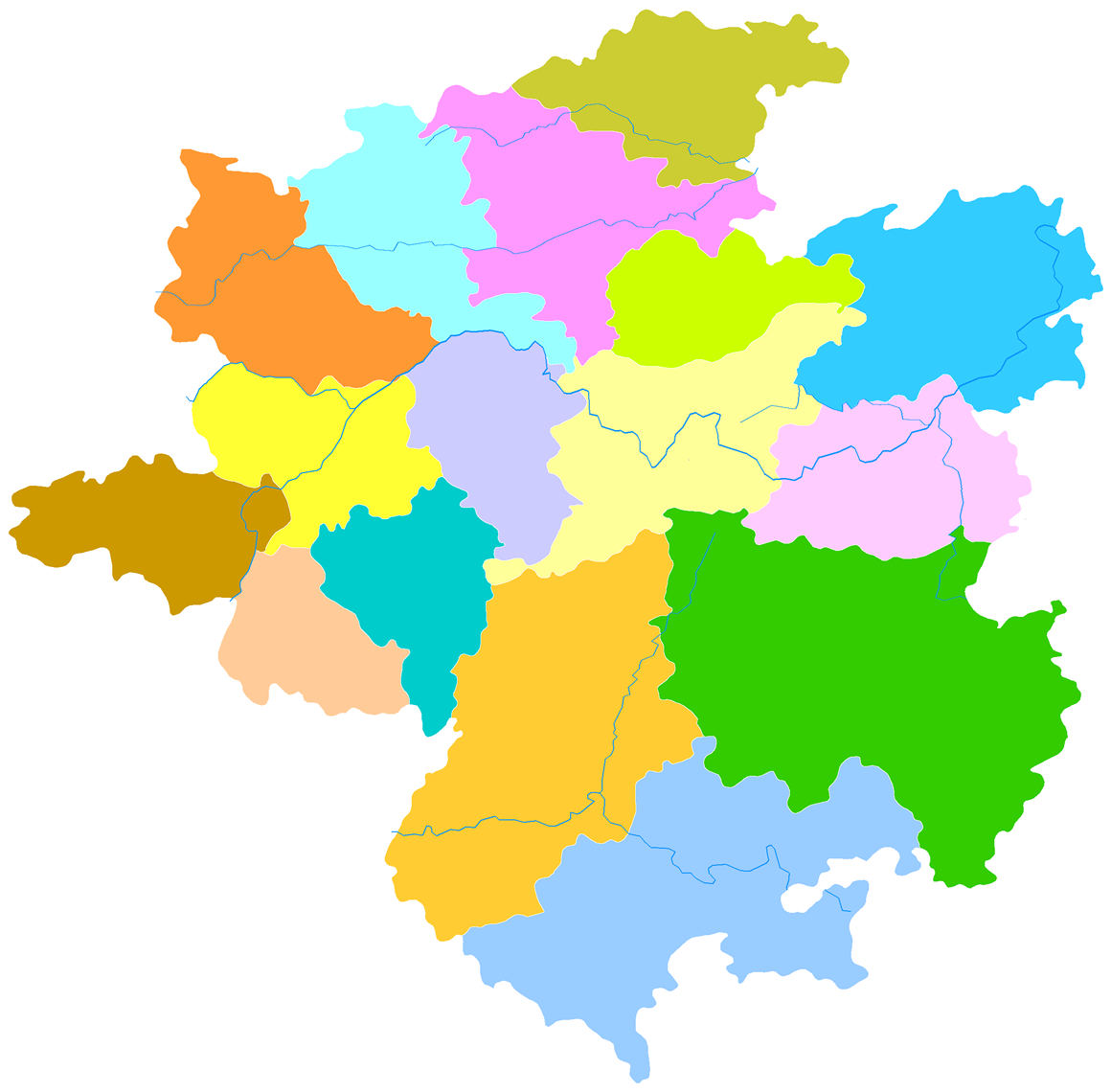
- Tianzhu is the easternmost division in this map of Qiandongnan

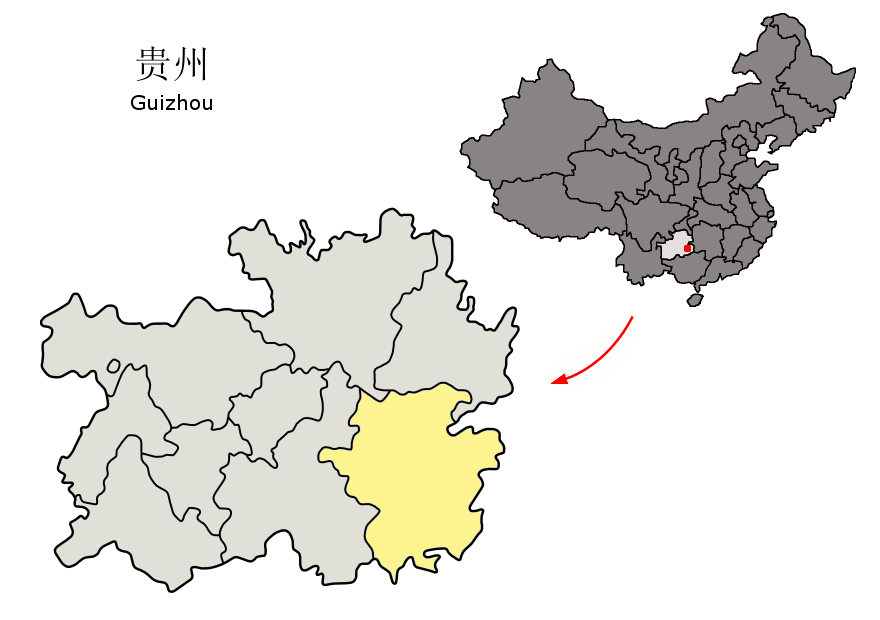
- Qiandongnan in Guizhou
- Coordinates (Tianzhu County government): 26°54′35″N 109°12′28″E
- Country: China
- Province: Guizhou
- Autonomous prefecture: Qiandongnan

Area
  - Total: 2,201 km^{2} (850 sq mi)

Population (2020)
  - Total: 273,588
  - Density: 124.3/km^{2} (321.9/sq mi)
- Time zone: UTC+8 (China Standard)

Tianzhu County (simplified Chinese: 天柱县; traditional Chinese: 天柱縣; pinyin: Tiānzhù Xiàn) is a county in eastern Guizhou province, China, bordering Hunan province to the north, east, and southeast. It is under the administration of the Qiandongnan Miao and Dong Autonomous Prefecture.

== Administrative divisions ==
Tianzhu County is divided into 3 subdistricts, 11 towns and 2 townships:

subdistricts

- Fengcheng 凤城街道
- Bangdong 邦洞街道
- Shexue 社学街道

towns

- Pingdi 坪地镇
- Lantian 兰田镇
- Wengdong 瓮洞镇
- Gaoniang 高酿镇
- Shidong 石洞镇
- Yuankou 远口镇
- Chachu 坌处镇
- Baishi 白市镇
- Duma 渡马镇
- Zhulin 竹林镇
- Jiangdong 江东镇

townships

- Zhuxi 注溪乡
- Dihu 地湖乡

== Climate ==
Climate data for Tianzhu, elevation 401 m (1,316 ft), (1991–2020 normals, extremes 1981–2010)
Month	Jan	Feb	Mar	Apr	May	Jun	Jul	Aug	Sep	Oct	Nov	Dec	Year
Record high °C (°F)	26.0 (78.8)	31.5 (88.7)	35.4 (95.7)	35.1 (95.2)	35.2 (95.4)	35.7 (96.3)	38.1 (100.6)	37.8 (100.0)	36.9 (98.4)	34.9 (94.8)	30.7 (87.3)	25.2 (77.4)	38.1 (100.6)
Mean daily maximum °C (°F)	8.6 (47.5)	11.5 (52.7)	15.9 (60.6)	22.3 (72.1)	26.2 (79.2)	28.9 (84.0)	31.6 (88.9)	31.5 (88.7)	28.0 (82.4)	22.2 (72.0)	17.2 (63.0)	11.4 (52.5)	21.3 (70.3)
Daily mean °C (°F)	5.1 (41.2)	7.5 (45.5)	11.4 (52.5)	17.1 (62.8)	21.2 (70.2)	24.4 (75.9)	26.6 (79.9)	25.9 (78.6)	22.4 (72.3)	17.3 (63.1)	12.3 (54.1)	7.1 (44.8)	16.5 (61.7)
Mean daily minimum °C (°F)	2.8 (37.0)	4.8 (40.6)	8.4 (47.1)	13.5 (56.3)	17.6 (63.7)	21.3 (70.3)	22.9 (73.2)	22.2 (72.0)	18.8 (65.8)	14.2 (57.6)	9.1 (48.4)	4.3 (39.7)	13.3 (56.0)
Record low °C (°F)	−8.2 (17.2)	−5.3 (22.5)	−2.3 (27.9)	3.1 (37.6)	6.7 (44.1)	12.6 (54.7)	15.4 (59.7)	16.0 (60.8)	10.7 (51.3)	2.8 (37.0)	−1.3 (29.7)	−5.3 (22.5)	−8.2 (17.2)
Average precipitation mm (inches)	54.8 (2.16)	55.5 (2.19)	94.4 (3.72)	129.6 (5.10)	197.2 (7.76)	236.0 (9.29)	173.3 (6.82)	133.8 (5.27)	96.1 (3.78)	86.6 (3.41)	61.9 (2.44)	44.7 (1.76)	1,363.9 (53.7)
Average precipitation days (≥ 0.1 mm)	15.8	14.9	18.4	17.7	17.5	16.9	12.8	12.3	10.6	13.4	11.8	11.6	173.7
Average snowy days	3.8	2.0	0.4	0	0	0	0	0	0	0	0	1.3	7.5
Average relative humidity (%)	83	81	82	81	81	83	80	81	81	82	82	80	81
Mean monthly sunshine hours	36.8	45.9	59.5	89.3	105.1	96.7	168.5	172.2	127.2	91.9	84.2	65.3	1,142.6
Percentage possible sunshine	11	14	16	23	25	23	40	43	35	26	26	20	25
Source: China Meteorological Administration
