= Fuluo =

Fuluo 扶罗镇
- Town
- Location in Hunan
- Coordinates: 27°11′37″N 109°08′56″E
- Country: People's Republic of China
- Province: Hunan
- Prefecture-level city: Huaihua
- Autonomous county: Xinhuang Dong Autonomous County
- Designated (town): 2000

Area
  - Total: 222 km^{2} (86 sq mi)
- Elevation: 400 m (1,300 ft)

Population (2016)
  - Total: 32,116
  - Density: 145/km^{2} (375/sq mi)
- Time zone: UTC+08:00 (China Standard)
- Postal code: 419212
- Area code: 0745

Fuluo (simplified Chinese: 扶罗镇; traditional Chinese: 扶羅鎮; pinyin: Fūluó Zhèn) is a rural town in Xinhuang Dong Autonomous County, Hunan, China. As of the 2016 census it had a population of 32,116 and an area of 222 square kilometres (86 sq mi). It is surrounded by Yushi Town on the north, Liangsan Town on the west, Hetan Town and Zhongzhai Town on the east, and Gongxi Town on the south.

== History ==
In April 2000 it was upgraded to a town. In December 2015, Xinzhai Township (Chinese: 新寨乡) and Lishu Township (Chinese: 李树乡) were revoked. Some areas merged into the town.

== Geography ==
The highest point in the town is Mount Mengchonggai (Chinese: 梦冲盖山) which stands 920 metres (3,020 ft) above sea level.

The Pingxi Stream (Chinese: 平溪河), a tributary of the Fuluo River (Chinese: 扶罗河), flows through the town.

The Chaoyang Reservoir (Chinese: 朝阳水库) is the largest body of water in the town.

== Economy ==
The town's economy is based on nearby mineral resources and agricultural resources. The region abound with barite, iron, lead and zinc.

The total grain output of this town is over 5500 tons per year, ranking first in Xinhuang Dong Autonomous County. It is known as "Granary of Xinhuang" (Chinese: 新晃粮仓).

== Transportation ==
The Provincial Highway S232 passes across the town north to south.
