= Miao people =

Ethnic group native to South China and Southeast Asia

Miao
苗族 Hmong / Hmub / Xongb / ab Hmaob m̥oŋ˦˧ / m̥ʰu˧ / ɕoŋ˧˥ / a˥˧m̥ao˥˧
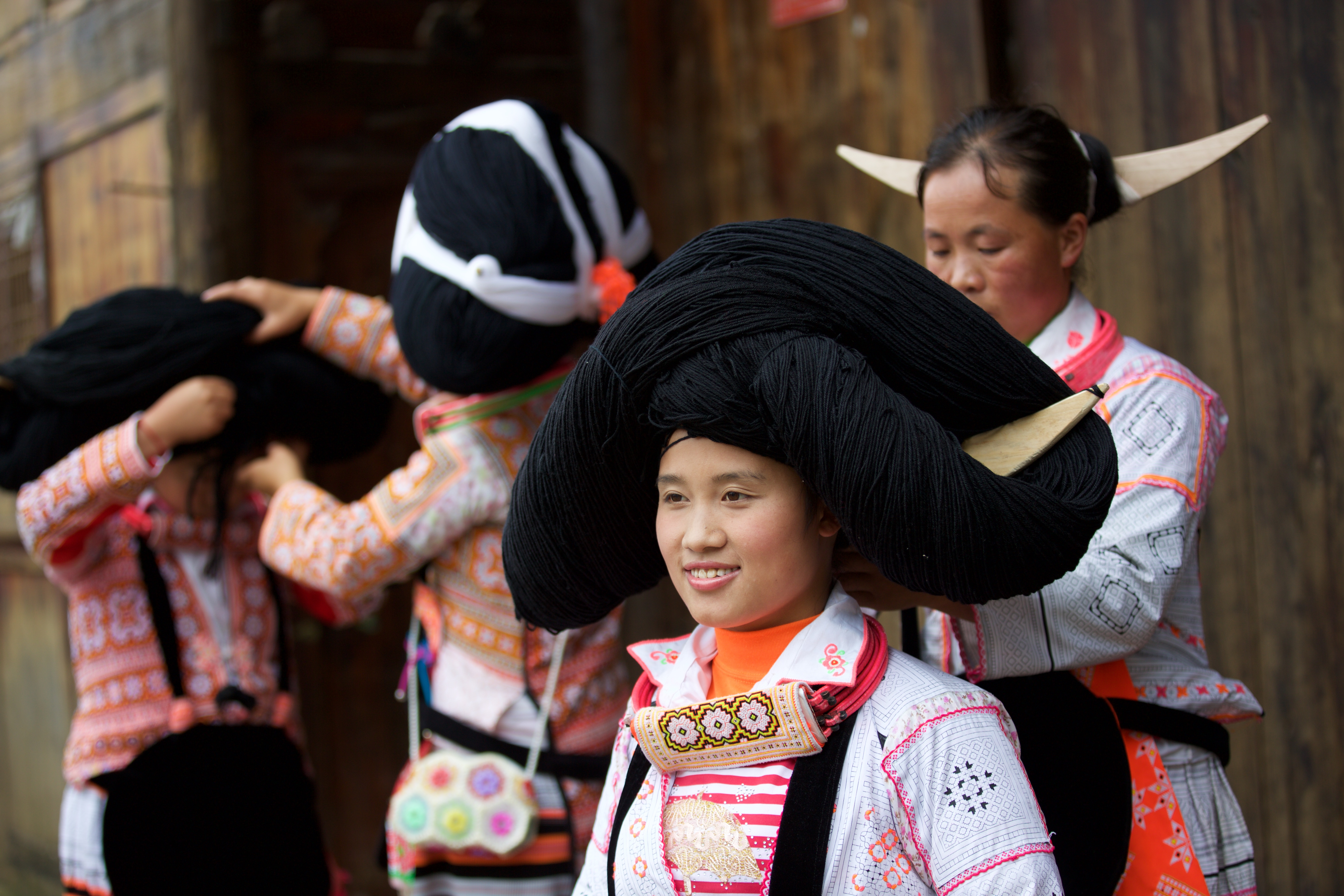
- Headdress of the Long-horn Miao—one of the small branches of Miao living in the 12 villages near Zhijin County, Guizhou

Total population
- 13 million

Regions with significant populations
- China: 11,067,929 (2020)
- Vietnam: 1,393,547 (2019)
- Laos: 595,028 (2015)
- United States: 299,000 (2015)
- Thailand: 250,070 (2015)
- France: 13,000
- Australia: 2,190

Languages
- Hmongic languages, Kim Mun language, Mandarin, Cantonese, Linglinghua, Maojia, Suantang, Vietnamese, Tai–Kadai languages (Lao and Thai), French

Religion
- Miao folk religion Minorities: Taoism, Atheism, Irreligion, Christianity, Buddhism

Miao people
- Chinese: 苗族
Transcriptions
Standard Mandarin
- Hanyu Pinyin: Miáozú
Wu
- Romanization: Miau-zoh
Hakka
- Romanization: Mèu-tshu̍k
Southern Min
- Hokkien POJ: Biâu-cho̍k
- Teochew Peng'im: Miêu-tsôk
Eastern Min
- Fuzhou BUC: Mièu-cŭk

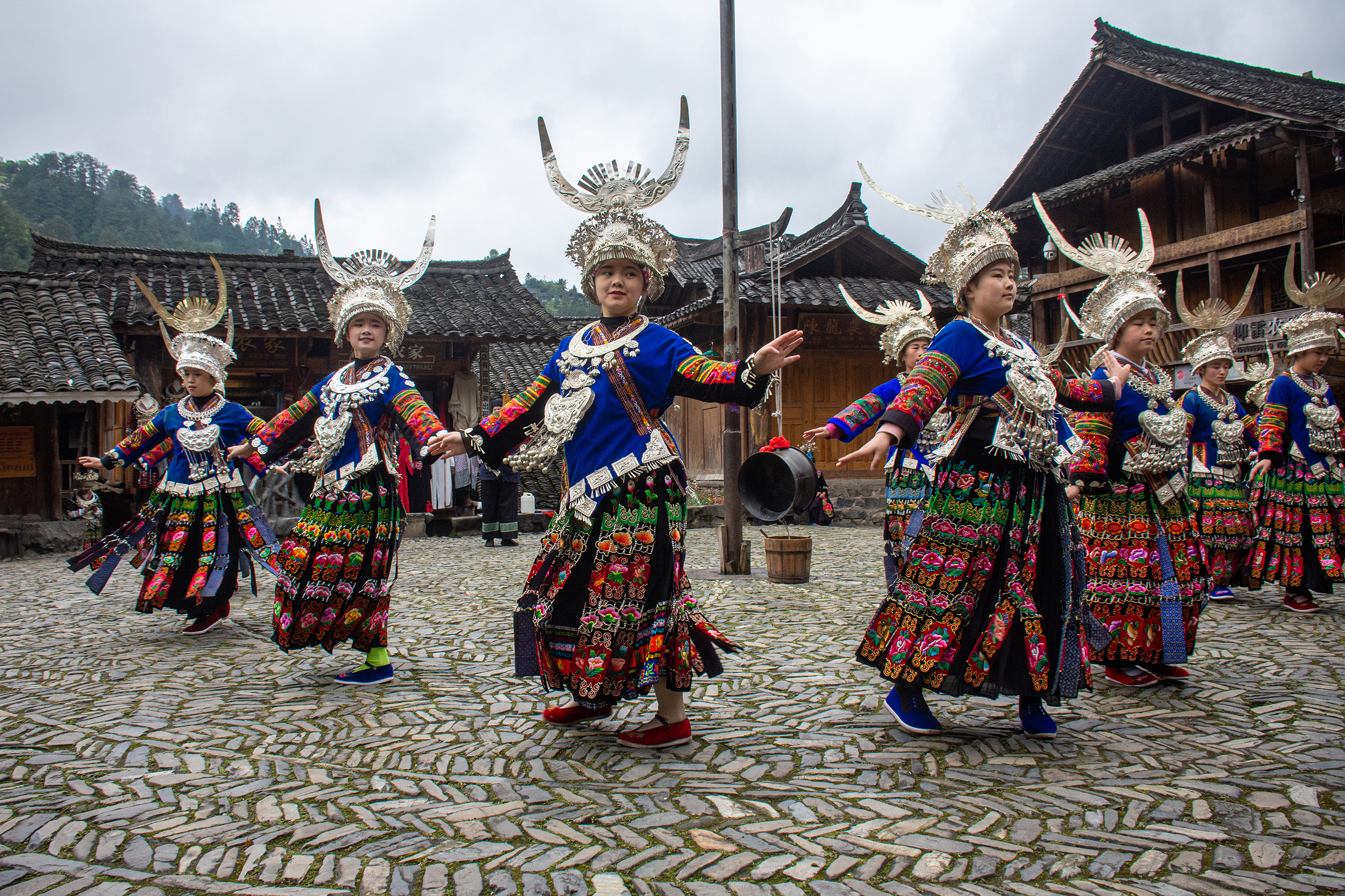
Miao folkdance – Guizhou, China

Miao are an ethnic group living in southern China and Mainland Southeast Asia. The Miao live primarily in the mountains of southern China encompassing the provinces of Guizhou, Yunnan, Sichuan, Hubei, Hunan, Guangxi, Guangdong, and Hainan. Some sub-groups of the Miao, most notably the Hmong people, migrated out of China into Southeast Asia (Myanmar, Northern Vietnam, Laos, and Thailand).

Miao is a Chinese term referring to many groups that have their own autonyms such as Hmong, Hmu, Xong (Qo-Xiong), and A-Hmao. These people (except those in Hainan) speak Hmongic languages, a subfamily of the Hmong–Mien languages (Miao-Yao) including many mutually unintelligible languages such as the mother tongues of the four primary groups that make up the Miao: Hmong, Hmu, Xong and A-Hmao.

The Miao umbrella group is not strictly defined by language or ethnicity. Not all Miao subgroups are Hmongic speakers, because the Mienic-speaking Kem Di Mun people in Hainan are also designated as the Miao by the Chinese government, although their linguistically and culturally identical fellows in continental China are designated as the Yao. Not all Hmongic speakers belong to the Miao either; for example, the speakers of the Bunu and Bahengic languages are designated as the Yao, and the speakers of the Sheic languages are designated as the She or the Yao.

== Miao and Hmong ==
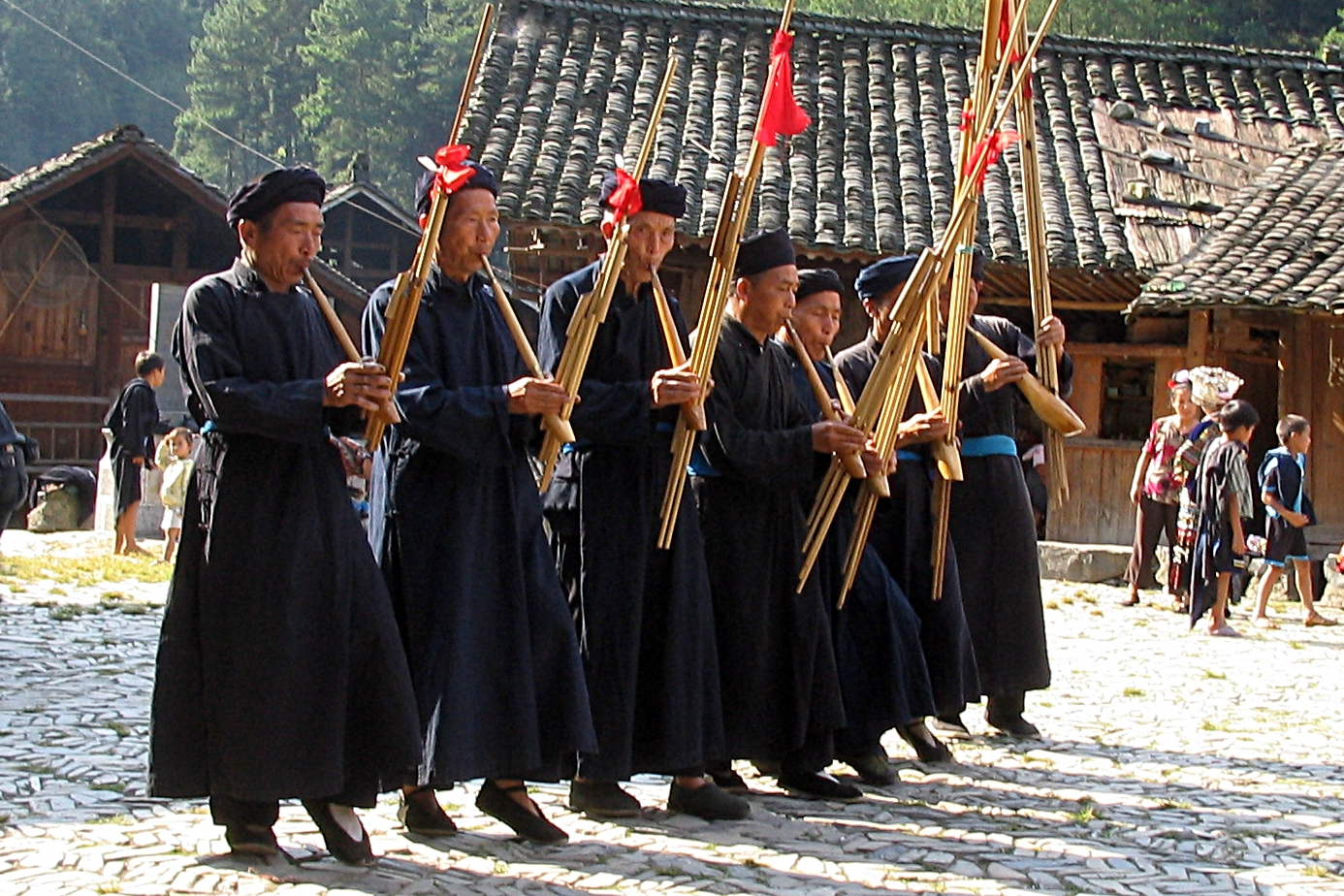
Miao musicians from the Langde Miao Ethnic Village, Guizhou

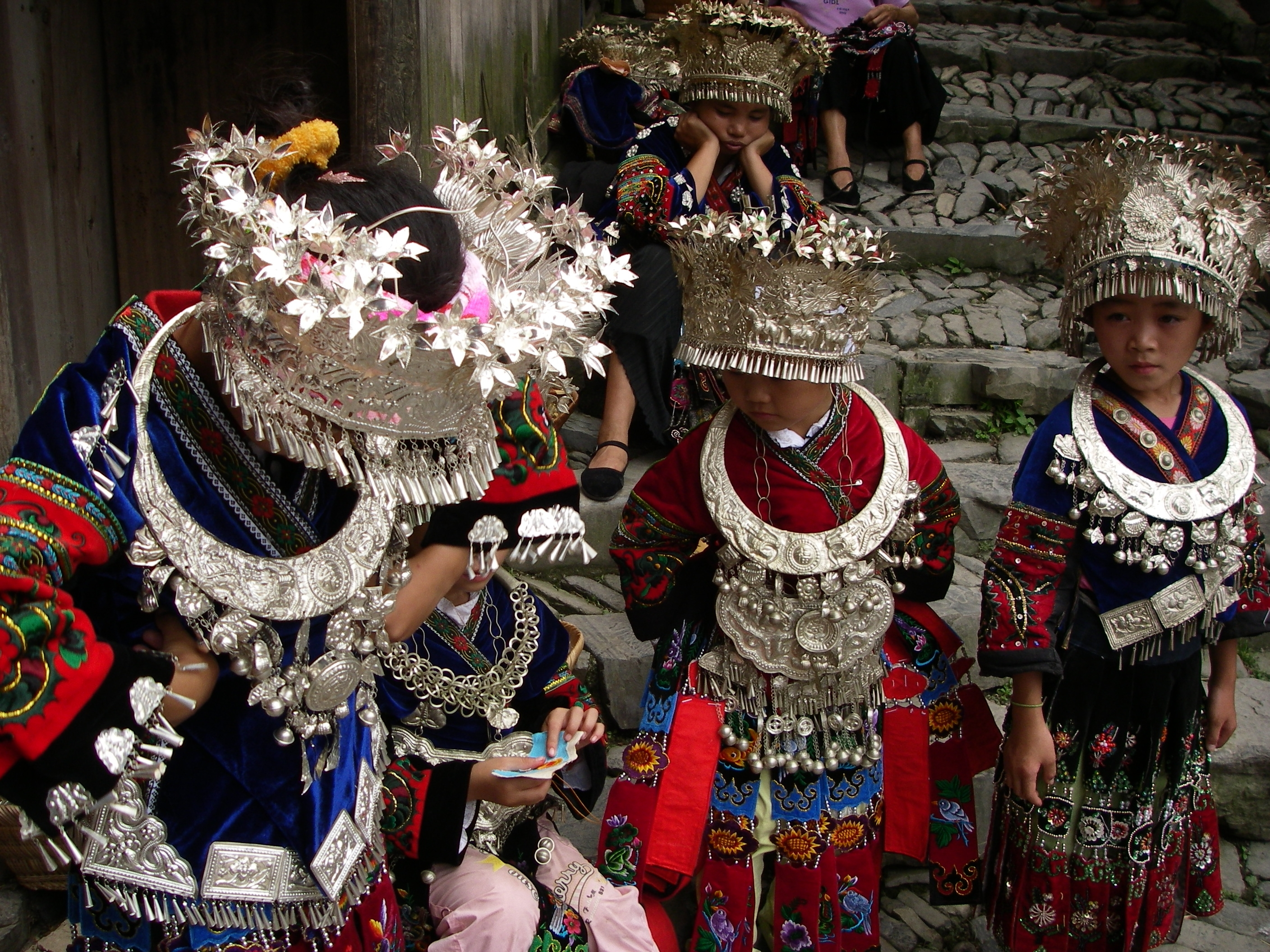
Miao girls also from Lang De, Guizhou, awaiting their turn to perform

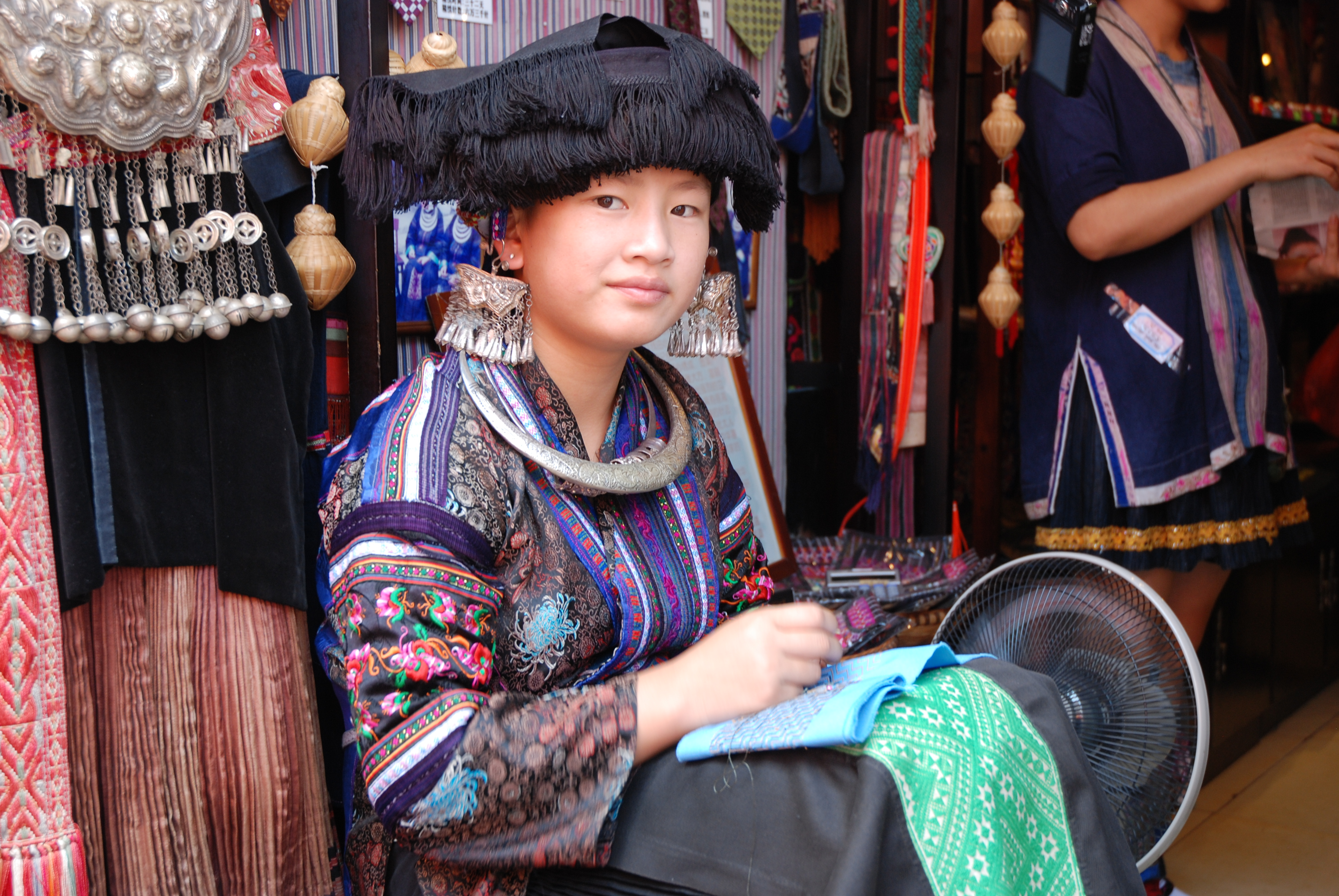
Young Miao woman in Yangshuo County

=== Miao official status ===
The term "Miao" gained official status in 1949 as a minzu (ethnic group) encompassing a group of linguistically related ethnic minorities (Hmong, Hmao, Hmu, Xong) in Southwest China. This was part of a larger effort to identify and classify minority groups to clarify their role in the national government, including establishing autonomous administrative divisions and allocating the seats for representatives in provincial and national government. The push to appropriate Miao as the official name of their minzu nationality received significant contributions from three Miao intellectuals. According to Gary Yia Lee writing in the Hmong Studies Journal, the choice to identify as Miao was a deliberate and strategic decision its members advocated for in recognition of its potential benefits. Rather than being split into multiple smaller groups with short and murky histories, the Miao chose to adopt one ethno-name representing 9.2 million people claiming a long history dating back to ancient China. Their larger population granted them the strength and support befitting of the fifth largest nationality in China. In addition, by claiming kinship to the San Miao referred to in ancient Chinese history, they positioned themselves as pre-existing inhabitants of China prior to the arrival of the Han, imparting a "legendary stature to the present-day Miao" that "bestows the dignity of great antiquity, authoritativeness and a firm standing in the documentary record".

=== Historical use ===
Historically, the term "Miao" was applied inconsistently to a variety of non-Han peoples. Early Chinese-based names use various transcriptions: Miao, Miao-tse, Miao-tsze, Meau, Meo, mo, Miao-tseu etc. In Southeast Asian contexts, words derived from the Chinese "Miao" took on a sense which was perceived as derogatory by the subgroups living in that region. The term re-appeared in the Ming dynasty (1368–1644), by which time it had taken on the connotation of "barbarian". Being a variation of Nanman, it was used to refer to the indigenous people in southern China who had not been assimilated into Han culture. During this time, references to "raw" (生 Sheng) and "cooked" (熟 Shu) Miao appear, referring to the level of assimilation and political cooperation of the two groups, making them easier to classify. Not until the Qing dynasty (1644–1911) do more finely grained distinctions appear in writing. Even then, discerning which ethnic groups are included in various classifications can be complex. There has been a historical tendency by the Hmong, who resisted assimilation and political cooperation, to group all Miao peoples together under the term Hmong because of the potential derogatory use of the term Miao. However it is uncertain if the Miao in historical records actually referred to the Hmong, or if they're referred to as such, and the modern Miao supra-ethno national group includes several groups other than the Hmong. In modern China the term continues to be used regarding the Miao people there.

According to Ruey (1962), the way in which Miao was used in Chinese can roughly be divided into three periods: a legendary period from 2300 BC to 200 BC, then a period when the term generally referred to southern barbarians until 1200 AD, and then a modern period during which the Hmong were probably included. In the 20th century, Western missionaries called the Hmong and Hmao the "Big Flowery Miao" (Da Hua Miao) and the "Little Flowery Miao" (Xiao Hua Miao). Another source states that the Green and White Miao were the Hmong, the Flowery Miao were the Hmao, the Black Miao were the Hmu, and the Red Miao were the Xong. According to She Miaojun, the Miao only existed as an exonym in the imagination of outsiders all the way up to the Qing dynasty. It did not refer to any self-defined ethnic group united by either territory or language. Others believe that Miao identity emerged during the rebellions of the 18th and 19th centuries.

Though the Miao themselves use various self-designations, the Chinese traditionally classify them according to the most characteristic color of the women's clothes. The list below contains some of these self-designations, the color designations, and the main regions inhabited by the four major groups of Miao in China:

- Ghao Xong/Qo Xiong; Xong; Red Miao; Qo Xiong Miao: West Hunan
- Gha Ne/Ka Nao; Hmub; Black Miao; Mhub Miao: Southeast Guizhou
- A-Hmao; Big Flowery Miao: West Guizhou and Northeast Yunnan
- Gha-Mu; Hmong, Mong; White Miao, Green/Blue Miao, Small Flowery Miao; South and East Yunnan, South Sichuan and West Guizhou

=== Differences between the Miao and Hmong ===
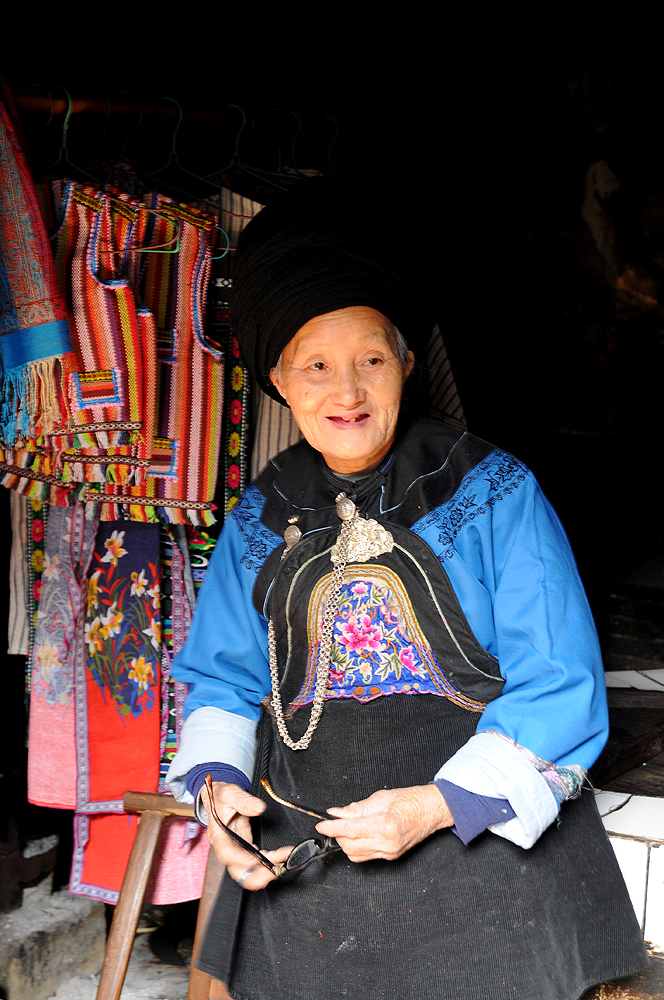
A Qho Xong Miao woman from Xiangxi, Hunan province.

Despite speaking related languages belonging to the Hmongic language group, the four primary ethnic groups that make up the official Miao minority group have little in common and their languages are mutually unintelligible. Even the group closest to the Hmong, the Hmao, speak a language that is as different from Hmong as Italian is to French. They diverged significantly as early as a thousand years ago, after which they may have had no relation to each other at all. Without their official classification as the Miao minority after 1949, it is unlikely that they would be able to recognize any affinity with each other. However none of the four groups have obtained official status as distinct minorities in China. Their names are generally unrecognized by the Chinese and are only used as part of the local vernacular language. As a result, only a small portion of the modern Miao people initially identified as Hmong. Of the nine million Miao (2005), around one-third (3 million) are Hmong. Cheung (1996) notes that of the three main texts on Miao culture and history written by Miao people themselves, none were by a Hmong.

The non-equivalence between the Miao and the Hmong was acknowledged in interactions between Hmong refugees and the Miao. When Hmong refugees from France and the US initially made contact with the Miao from China in officially sanctioned visits, they were introduced to the Xong Miao people who were neither Hmong nor spoke the Hmong language. An eyewitness recounts several occasions when a Hmong and a Hmao tried to understand each other's languages without success. They also met an assortment of Miao people who no longer spoke their native language and only knew Chinese. The visiting Hmong were themselves not from China but Southeast Asia. Some Hmong went further to seek out "really Hmong" people through unofficial channels with whom they could speak Hmong to. However even after successfully finding them, they found that there were dialect variations that differed from the Hmong that they grew up speaking. As Hmong refugees discovered the differences between themselves and the Chinese Miao, some non-Hmong Miao people such as the Hmu started referring to themselves as Hmong to express nationalistic sentiments. Contributing to this trend is the tendency of professional linguists to use the names of smaller ethnic groups to refer to the broader categories such as Hmong–Mien languages rather than Miao-Yao languages. This is due to the significant influence of groups outside of Asia, such as the Hmong and Mien, who are able to articulate their cause. This influence encourages movements within the Miao to identify as Hmong, allowing subgroups who do not traditionally identify as Hmong to express solidarity or connect with the international community.

== Gender roles ==
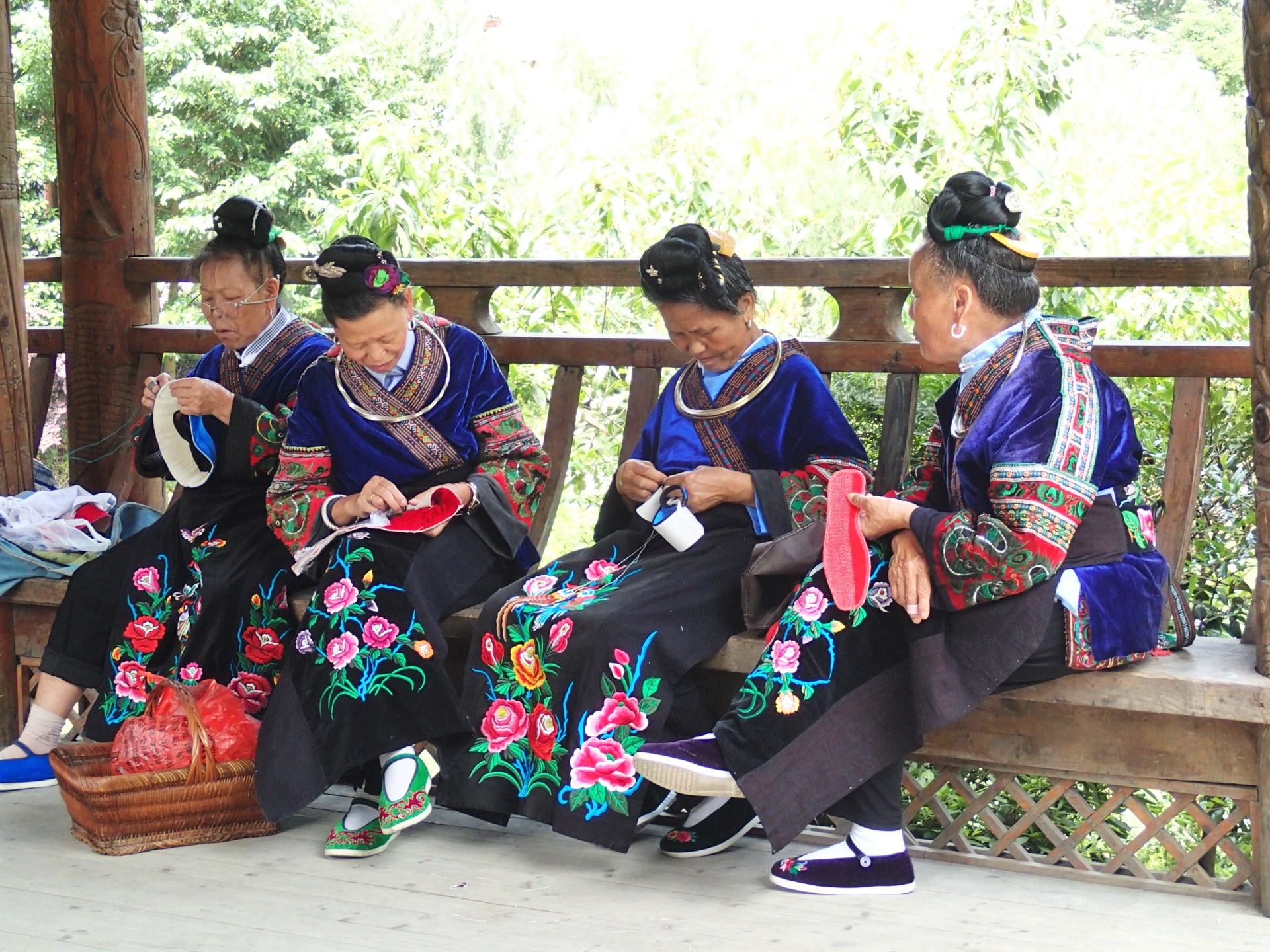
Miao women from Leishan County, Qiandongnan

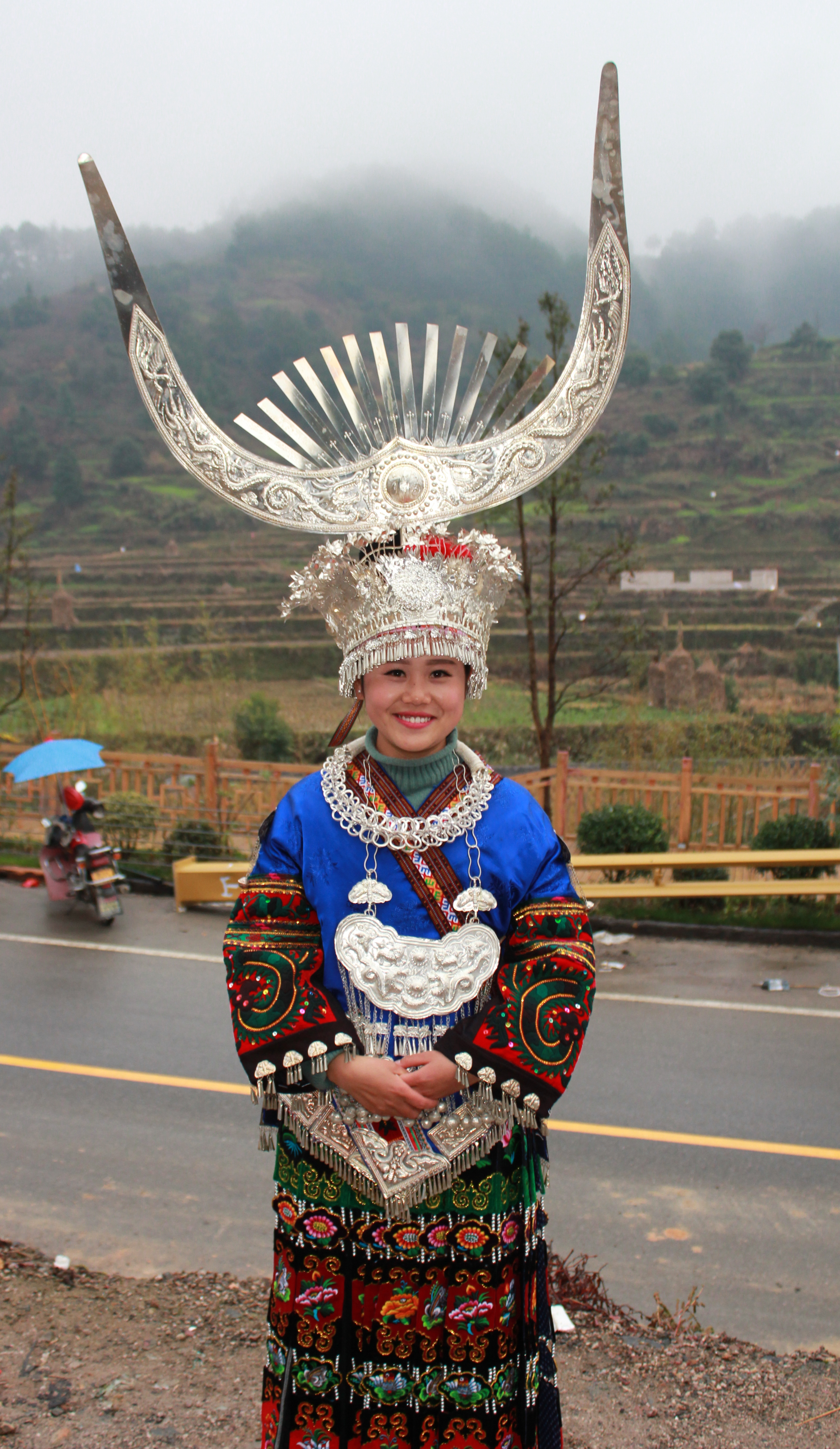
Headdress of Miao woman from Danjiang town, Qiandongnan

Costume of Flowery Miao women of Wenshan, Yunnan province

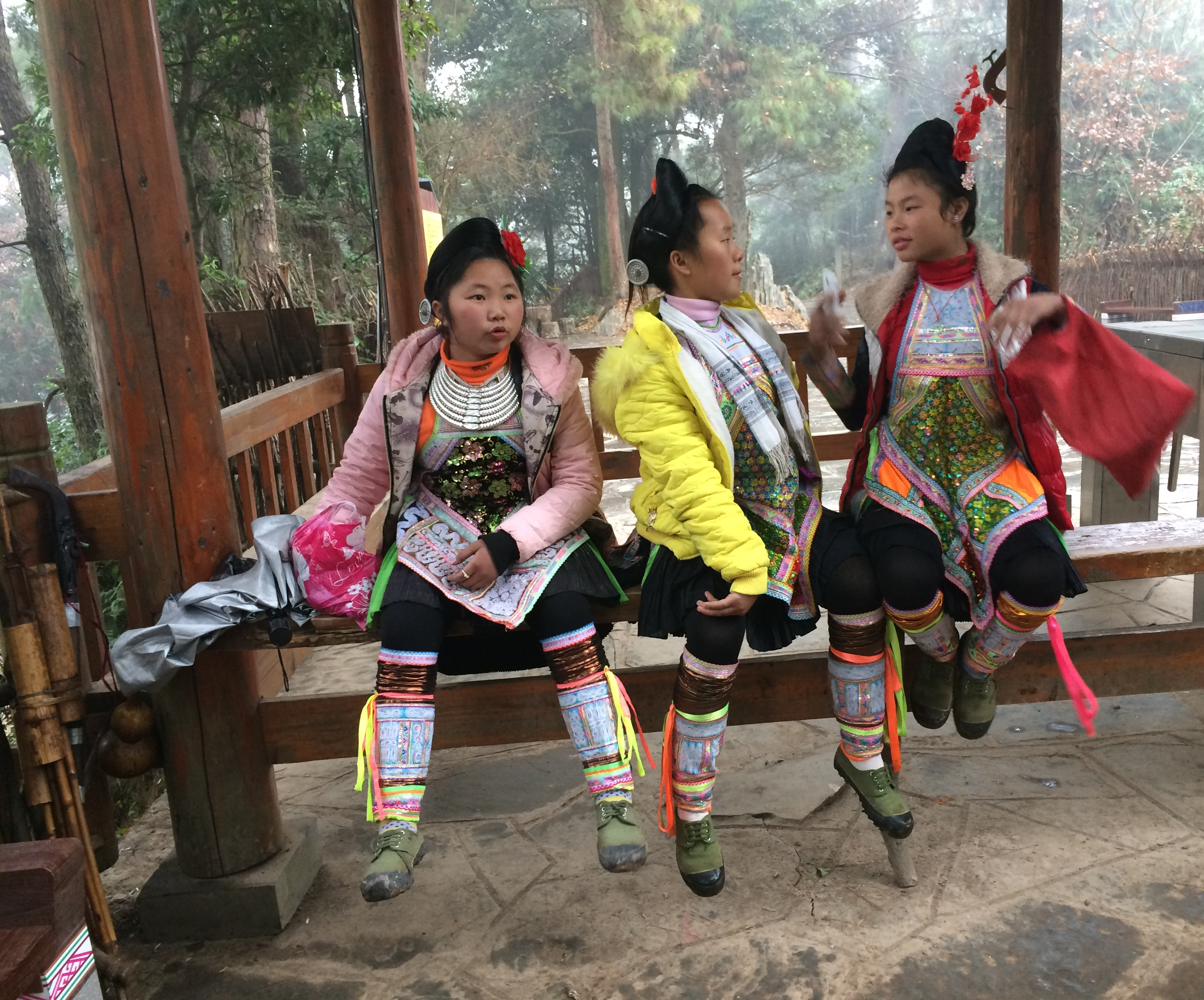
Baisha Miao ladies from southeastern Guizhou

=== Women's status ===
Compared to the Confucian principles traditionally exercised over women in some regions of China, the Miao culture is generally less strict in categorization of women's roles in society. Miao women exercise relatively more independence, mobility and social freedom. They are known to be strong-willed and politically minded. They actively contribute to their communities in social welfare, education, arts and culture, and agricultural farming.

Miao women are known for the making of traditional clothing and handicrafts, including embroidering, weaving, paper-cutting, batik, and intricate jewelry casting. The patterns on their clothes are extremely complicated and colorful. Girls around the age of seven will learn embroidering from mothers and sisters, and are exepcted to be "deft" at the craft by the time they are teenagers. Additionally, Miao silver jewelry is distinctive for its design, style and craftsmanship. Miao silver jewelry is completely handmade, carved with fine decorative patterns. Miao techniques do not have an official uniform standard. The Miao embroidery and silver jewelry are highly valued for their delicate design.

Silver jewelry is a highly valuable craftwork of the Miao people. Apart from being a cultural tradition, it also symbolises the wealth of Miao women. As a Miao saying goes, "decorated with no silver or embroidery, a girl is not a girl", Miao women are occasionally defined by the amount of silver jewelry she wears or owns. It is especially important to wear heavy and intricate silver headdresses and jewelry during significant occasions and festivals, notably during weddings, funerals and springtime celebration. Silver jewelry is an essential element of Miao marriages, particularly to the bride. Miao families would begin saving silver jewellery for the girls at an early age, wishing their daughters could marry well with the large amount of silver jewelry representing the wealth of the family. Although a growing Miao population is moving from rural Miao regions to cities, the new generation respects the families' silver heritage and is willing to pass on the practice as a cultural tradition more than a showcase of family wealth.

=== Workforce and income ===
Although Miao women are not strictly-governed, their social status is often seen as lower than that of men, as in most patriarchal societies. Be it in the subsistence economy or otherwise, men are the main economic force and provide the stable source of income for the family. Women are primarily involved in social welfare, domestic responsibilities, and additionally earn supplementary income.

As tourism became a major economic activity to this ethnic group, Miao women gained more opportunities to join the labor force and earn an income. Women mostly take up jobs that require modern day customer service skills; for example, working as tour guides, selling craftwork and souvenirs, teaching tourists how to make flower wreaths, and even renting ethnic costumes. These jobs require soft skills and hospitality and more visibility in public, but provide a low income. On the contrary, Miao men take up jobs that require more physical strengths and less visibility in public, such as engineering roads, building hotels, boats and pavilions. These jobs generally provide a more stable and profitable source of income.

The above example of unequal division of labor demonstrates, in spite of socioeconomic changes in China, men are still considered the financial backbone of the family.

=== Marriage and family ===
While the Miao people have had their own unique culture, the Confucian ideology exerted significant influences on this ethnic group. It is expected that men are the dominant figures and breadwinners of the family, while women occupy more domestic roles (like cooking and cleaning). There are strict social standards on women to be "virtuous wives and good mothers", and to abide by "three obediences and four virtues", which include cultural moral specifications of women's behavior.

A Miao woman has some cultural freedom in marrying a man of her choice. However, like many other cultures in Asia, there are strict cultural practices on marriage, one being clan exogamy. It is a taboo to marry someone within the same family clan name, even when the couple are not blood related or from the same community.

In contrast to the common practice of the right of succession belonging to the firstborn son, the Miao's inheritance descends to the youngest son. The older sons leave the family and build their own residences, usually in the same province and close to the family. The youngest son is responsible for living with and caring for the aging parents, even after marriage. He receives a larger share of the family's inheritance and his mother's silver jewelry collection, which is used as bridal wealth or dowry.

Some imperially commissioned Han Chinese chieftaincies assimilated with the Miao. Those became the ancestors of a part of the Miao population in Guizhou.

The Hmong Tian clan in Sizhou began in the seventh century as a migrant Han Chinese clan.

The origin of the Tunbao people traces back to the Ming dynasty when the Hongwu Emperor sent 300,000 Han Chinese male soldiers in 1381 to conquer Yunnan, with some of the men marrying Yao and Miao women.

The presence of women presiding over weddings was a feature noted in "Southeast Asian" marriages, such as in 1667 when a Miao woman in Yunnan married a Chinese official. Some Sinicization occurred, in Yunnan a Miao chief's daughter married a scholar in the 1600s who wrote that she could read, write, and listen in Chinese and read Chinese classics.

== History ==
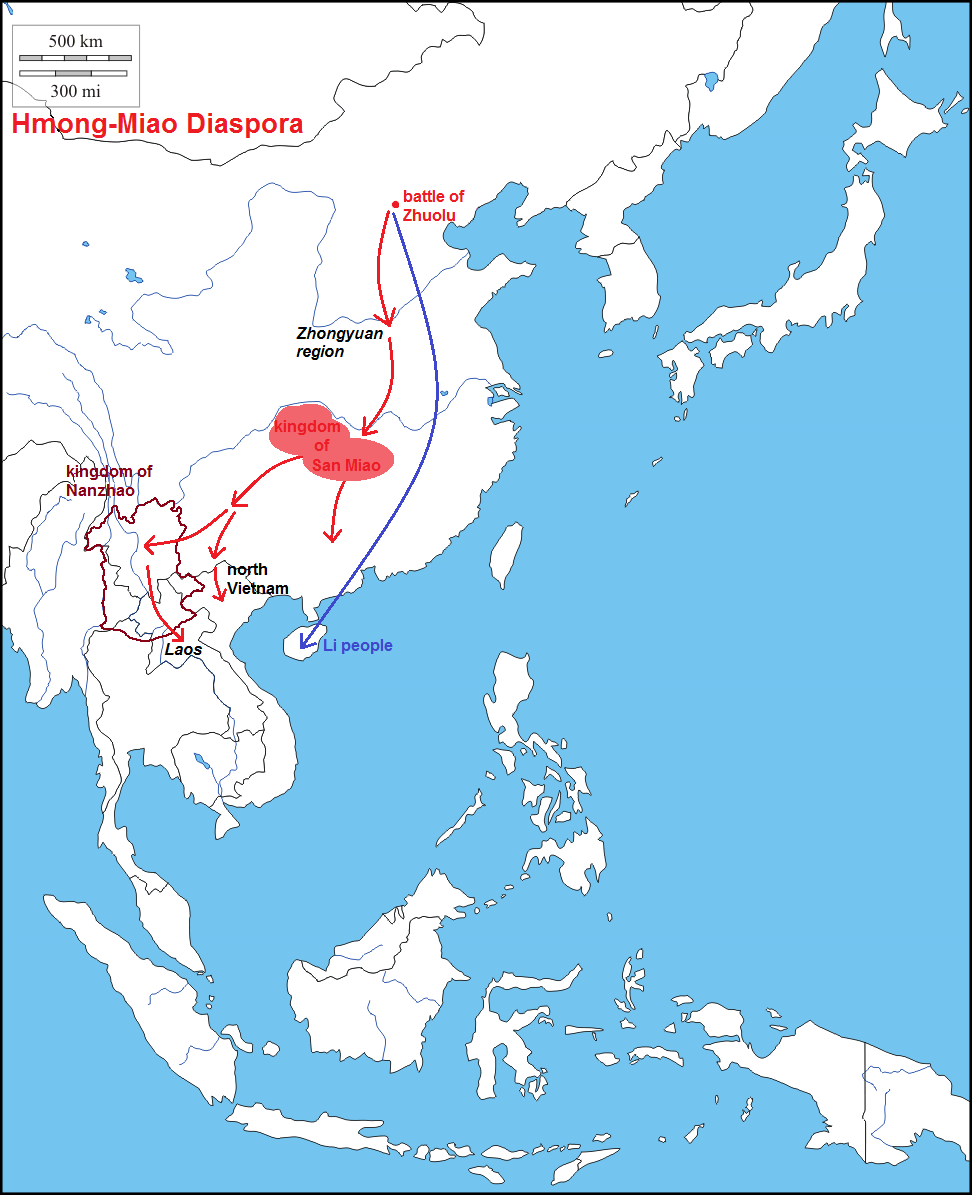
The migration of the Hmong according to legend.

=== Legend of Chiyou and origins ===
According to a Tang dynasty Chinese legend, the Miao who descended from the Jiuli tribe led by Chiyou (Chinese: 蚩尤; pinyin: Chīyóu) were defeated at the Battle of Zhuolu (涿鹿; Zhuōlù, a defunct prefecture on the border of present provinces of Hebei and Liaoning) by the military coalition of Huang Di (黃帝; Huángdì) and Yan Di, leaders of the Huaxia (華夏; Huáxià) tribe as the two tribes struggled for supremacy of the Yellow River valley.

The San Miao, according to legend, are the descendants of the Jiuli Tribe. Chinese records record a San Miao (三苗, Three Miao) kingdom around Dongting Lake. It was defeated by Yu the Great. Another Miao kingdom may have emerged in Yunnan around 704 BC that was subjugated by the Chinese in the 3rd century BC. In 2002, the Chu language has been identified as perhaps having influence from Tai–Kam and Miao–Yao languages by researchers at University of Massachusetts Amherst.

=== Dispersal ===
The Miao were not mentioned again in Chinese records until the Tang dynasty (618–907). In the following period, the Miao migrated throughout southern China and Southeast Asia. They generally inhabited mountainous or marginal lands and took up swidden or slash-and-burn cultivation techniques to farm these lands.

During the Miao Rebellions of the Ming dynasty, thousands of Miao were killed by the imperial forces. Mass castrations of Miao boys also took place.

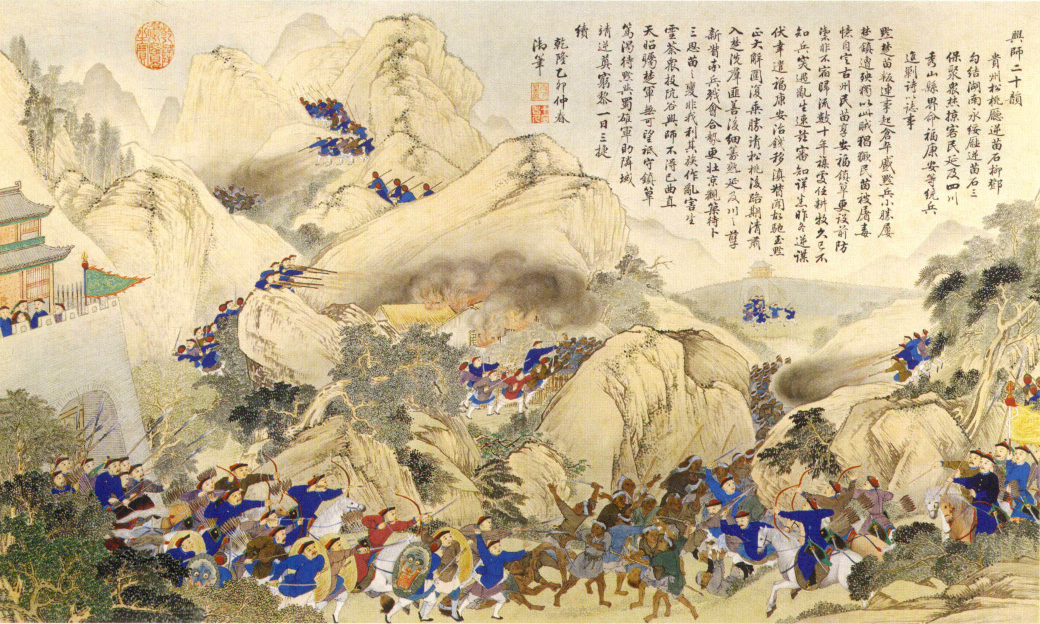
A Qing-era painting depicting a government campaign against the Miao in Hunan, 1795.

During the Qing Dynasty the Miao fought three wars against the empire. In 1725, a Miao rebellion in Weining, Guizhou, wa suppressed by the imperial army under the lead of Ha Yuansheng. The issue was so serious that the Yongzheng emperor sent one of his most important officials, Ortai, to be the Viceroy of the provinces with significant Miao populations in 1726, and through 1731, he spent his time putting down rebellions. In 1735 in the southeastern province of Guizhou, the Miao rose up against the government's forced assimilation. Eight counties involving 1,224 villages fought until 1738 when the revolt ended. According to Xiangtan University Professor Wu half the Miao populations were affected by the war.

The second war (1795–1806) involved the provinces of Guizhou and Hunan. Shi Sanbao and Shi Liudeng led this second revolt. Again, it ended in failure, but it took 11 years to quell the uprising.

The greatest of the three wars occurred from 1854 to 1873. Zhang Xiu-mei led this revolt in Guizhou until his capture and death in Changsha, Hunan. This revolt affected over one million people and all the neighbouring provinces. By the time the war ended Professor Wu said only 30 percent of the Miao were left in their home regions. This defeat led to the Hmong people migrating out of China into Laos and Vietnam.

During Qing times, more military garrisons were established in southwest China. Han Chinese soldiers moved into the Taijiang region of Guizhou, married Miao women, and the children were brought up as Miao. In spite of rebellion against the Han, Hmong leaders made allies with Han merchants.

The imperial government had to rely on political means to bring in Hmong people into the government: they created multiple competing positions of substantial prestige for Miao people to participate and assimilate into the Qing government system. During the Ming and Qing times, the official position of Kiatong was created in Indochina. The Miao would employ the use of the Kiatong government structure until the 1900s when they entered into French colonial politics in Indochina.

=== 20th century ===
During the founding of the People's Republic of China (PRC), the Miao played an important role in its birth when they helped Mao Zedong to escape the Kuomintang in the Long March with supplies and guides through their territory.

In Vietnam, a powerful Hmong named Vuong Chinh Duc, dubbed the king of the Hmong, aided Ho Chi Minh's nationalist move against the French, and thus secured the Hmong's position in Vietnam. In Điện Biên Phủ, Hmongs fought on the side of the communist Viet Minh against the pro-French Tai Dam aristocrats. During the Vietnam War, Miao fought on both sides, the Hmong in Laos primarily for the US, across the border in Vietnam for the North-Vietnam coalition, the Chinese-Miao for the Communists. However, after the war the Vietnamese were very aggressive towards the Hmong who suffered many years of reprisals. Most Hmong in Thailand also supported a brief Communist uprising during the war.

=== Miao clans with Han origins ===
Some of the origins of the Hmong and Miao clan names are a result of the marriage of Hmong women to Han Chinese men, with distinct Han Chinese-descended clans and lineages practicing Han Chinese burial customs. These clans were called "Han Chinese Hmong" ("Hmong Sua") in Sichuan, and were instructed in military tactics by fugitive Han Chinese rebels. Such Chinese "surname groups" are comparable to the patrilineal Hmong clans and also practice exogamy.

Han Chinese male soldiers who fought against the Miao rebellions during the Qing and Ming dynasties were known to have married with non-Han women such as the Miao because Han women were less desirable. The Wang clan, founded among the Hmong in Gongxian county of Sichuan's Yibin district, is one such clan and can trace its origins to several such marriages around the time of the Ming dynasty suppression of the Ah rebels. Nicholas Tapp wrote that, according to The Story of the Ha Kings in the village, one such Han ancestor was Wang Wu. It is also noted that the Wang typically sided with the Chinese, being what Tapp calls "cooked" as opposed to the "raw" peoples who rebelled against the Chinese.

Hmong women who married Han Chinese men founded a new Xem clan among Northern Thailand's Hmong. Fifty years later in Chiangmai two of their Hmong boy descendants were Catholics. A Hmong woman and Han Chinese man married and founded northern Thailand's Lau2, or Lauj, clan, with another Han Chinese man of the family name Deng founding another Hmong clan. Some scholars believe this lends further credence to the idea that some or all of the present day Hmong clans were formed in this way.

Jiangxi Han Chinese are claimed by some as the forefathers of the southeast Guizhou Miao, and Miao children were born to the many Miao women married Han Chinese soldiers in Taijiang in Guizhou before the second half of the 19th century.

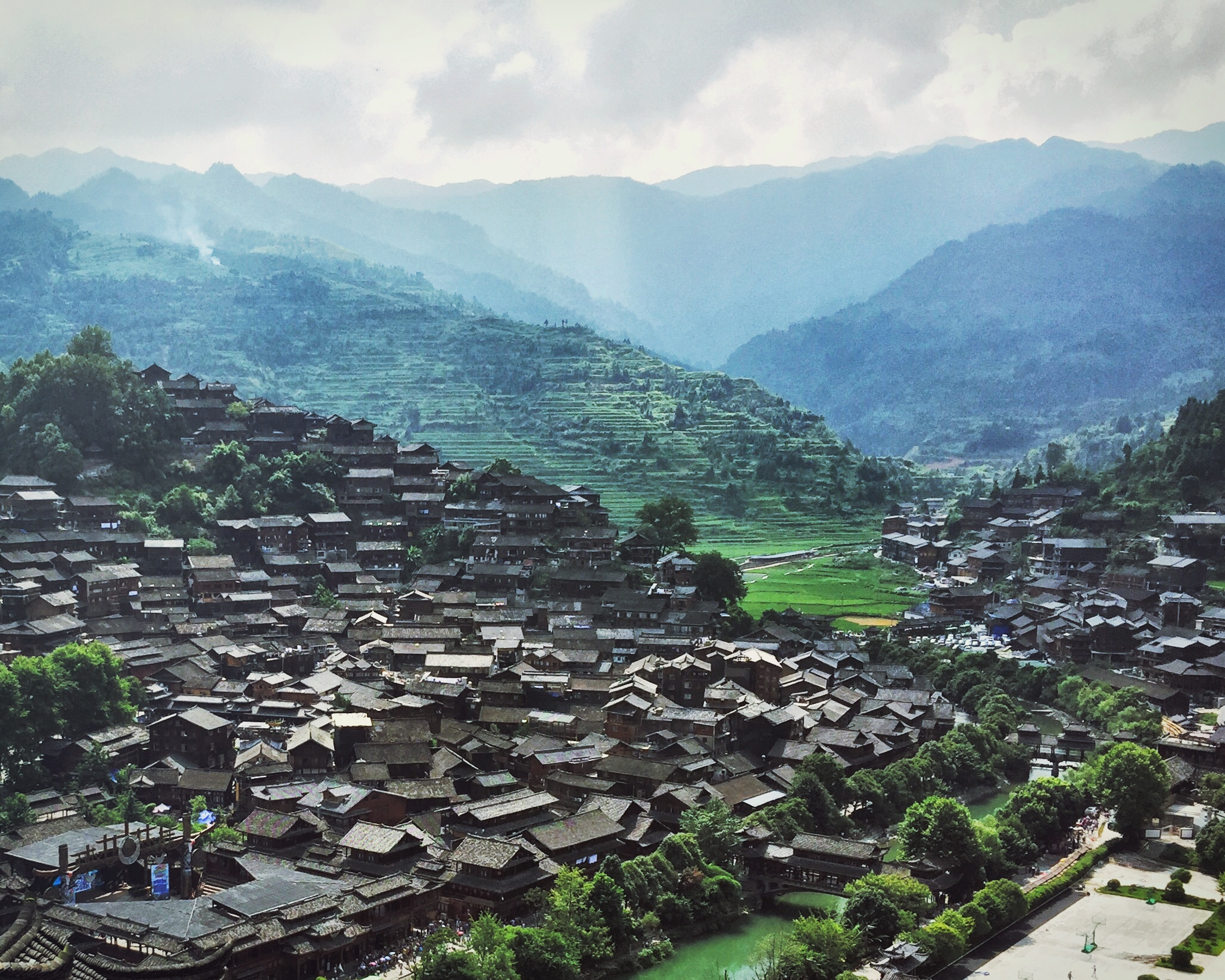
Xijiang, a Miao-majority township in Guizhou

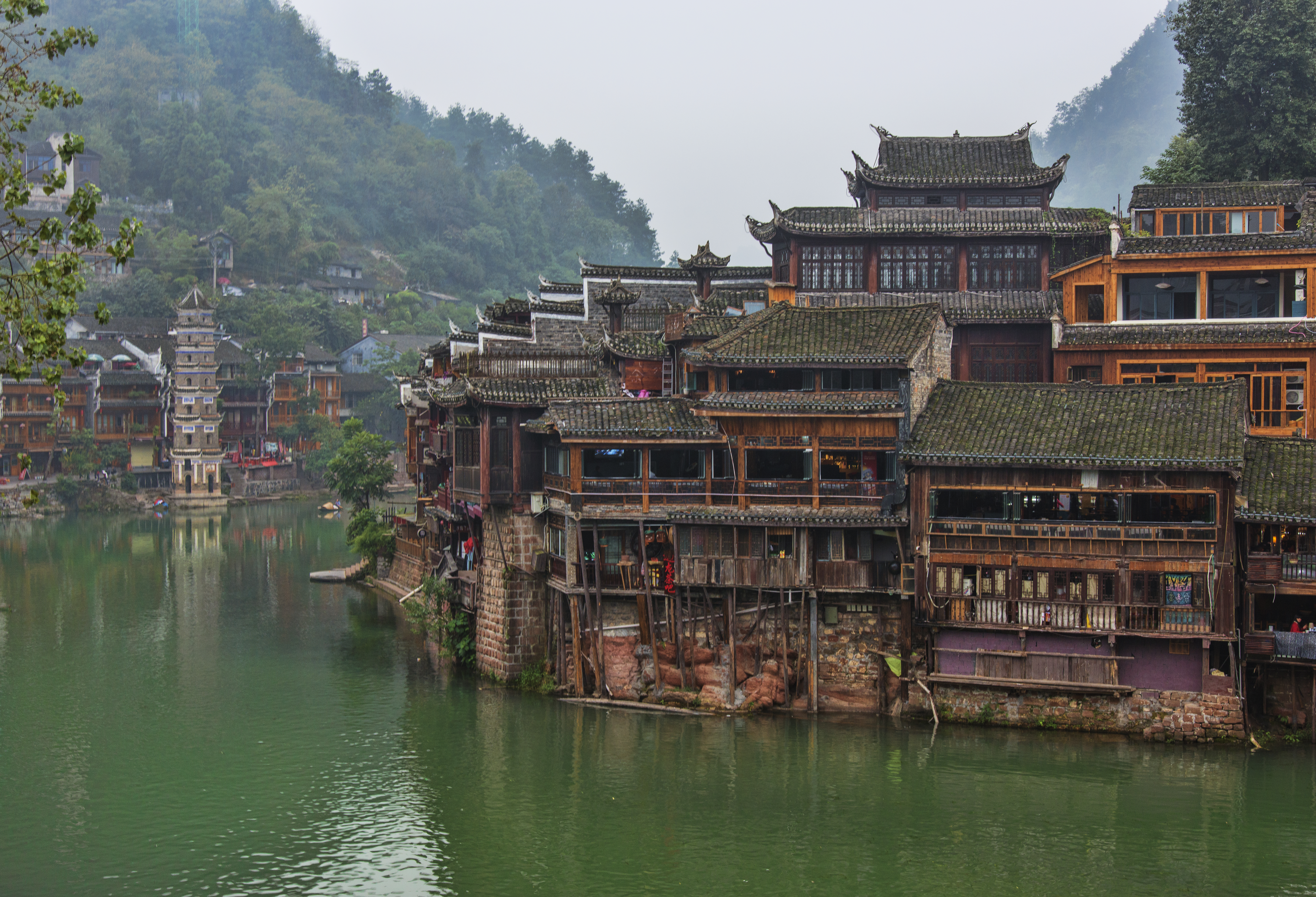
Fenghuang, Hunan a town famous for its Miao culture

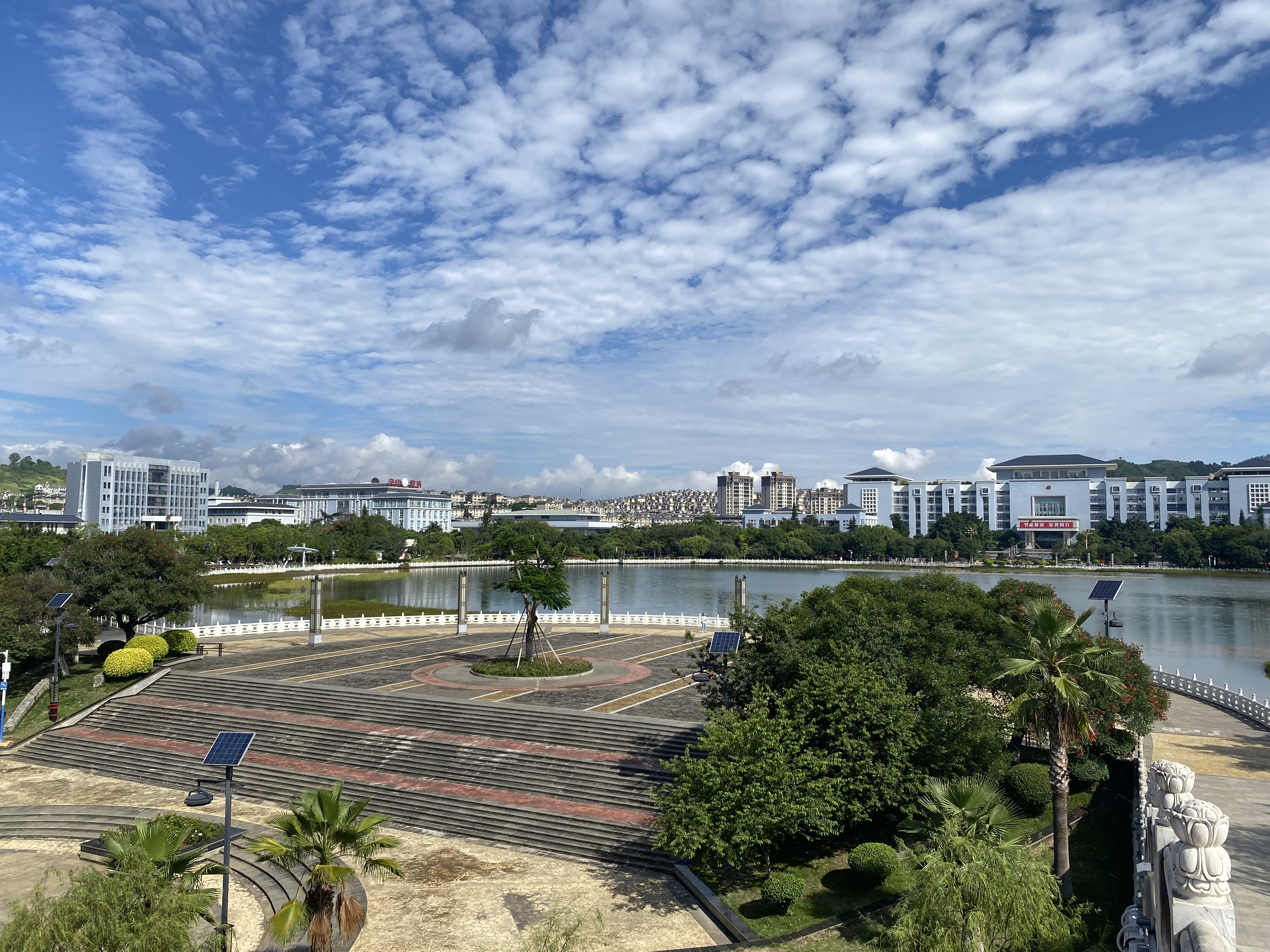
Wenshan, Yunnan, a Miao-majority city

== Archaeology ==
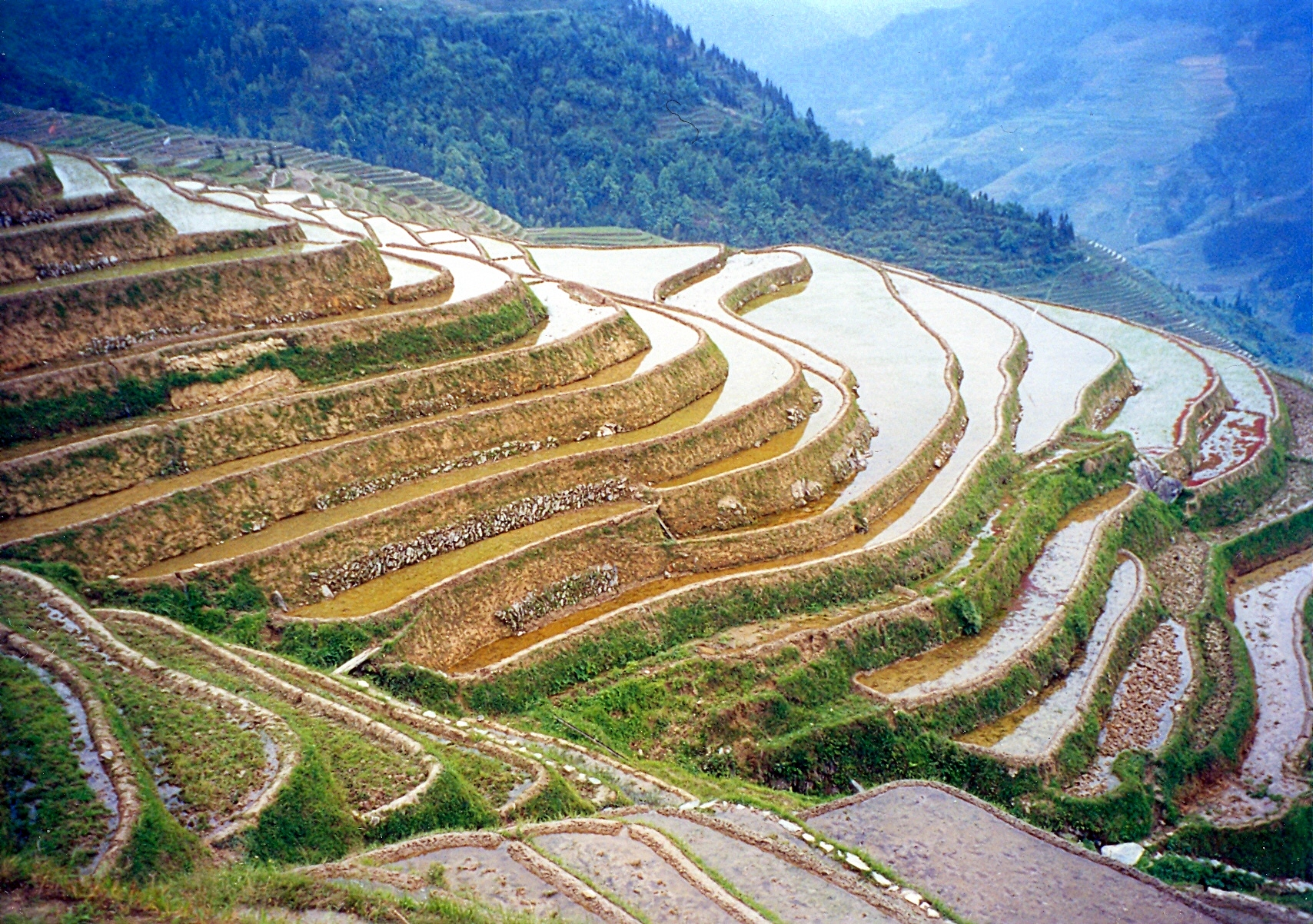
Rice terrace farming in Longji, Guangxi.

According to André-Georges Haudricourt and David Strecker's claims based on limited secondary data, the Miao were among the first people to settle in present-day China. They claim that the Han borrowed a lot of words from the Miao in regard to rice farming. This indicated that the Miao were among the first rice farmers in China. In addition, some have connected the Miao to the Daxi Culture (5,300–6,000 years ago) in the middle Yangtze River region. The Daxi Culture has been credited with being amongst the first cultivators of rice in the Far East by Western scholars. However, in 2006 rice was found to have existed in the Shandong province even earlier than the Daxi Culture, although this Yuezhuang culture had collected wild rice and not actual cultivated and domesticated rice like that of the Daxi.

A western study mention that the Miao (especially the Miao-Hunan) has its origins in southern China but have some DNA from the Northeast people of China. Recent DNA samples of Miao males contradict this theory. The White Hmong have 25% C, 8% D, & 6% N(Tat) yet they have the least contact with the Han population.

== Demographics ==
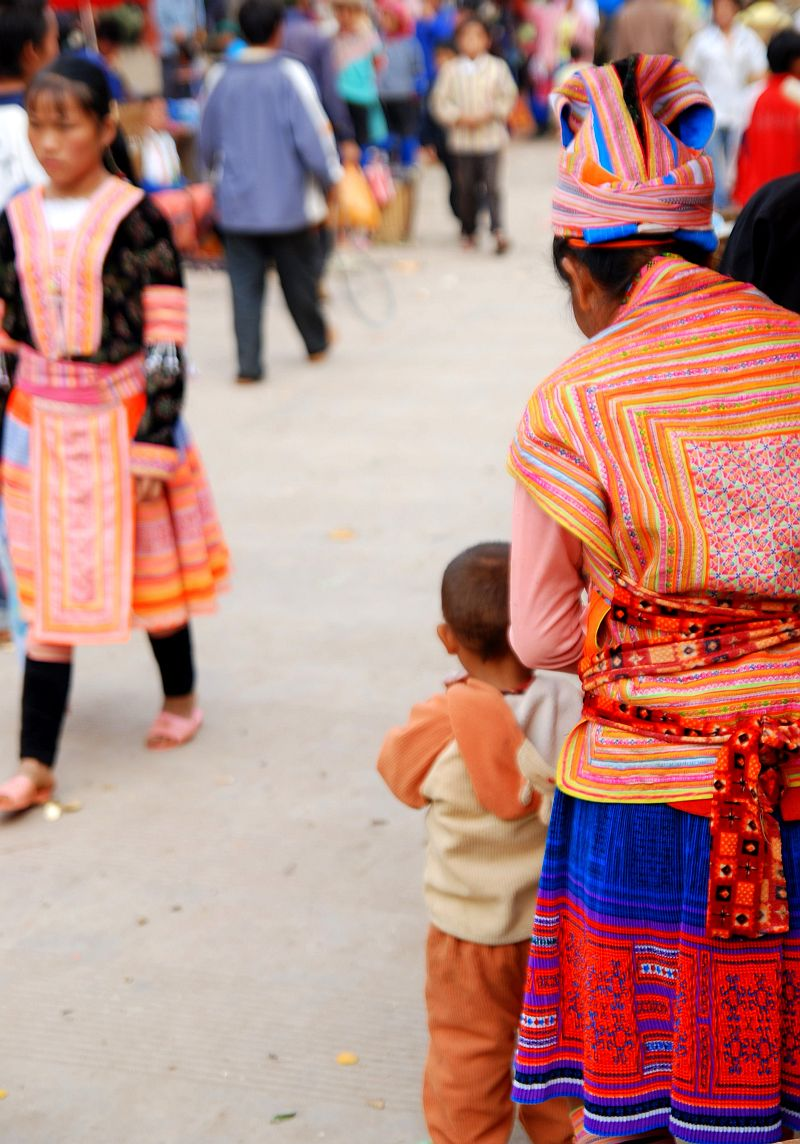
Miao women during market day in Laomeng village, Yuanyang County, Yunnan

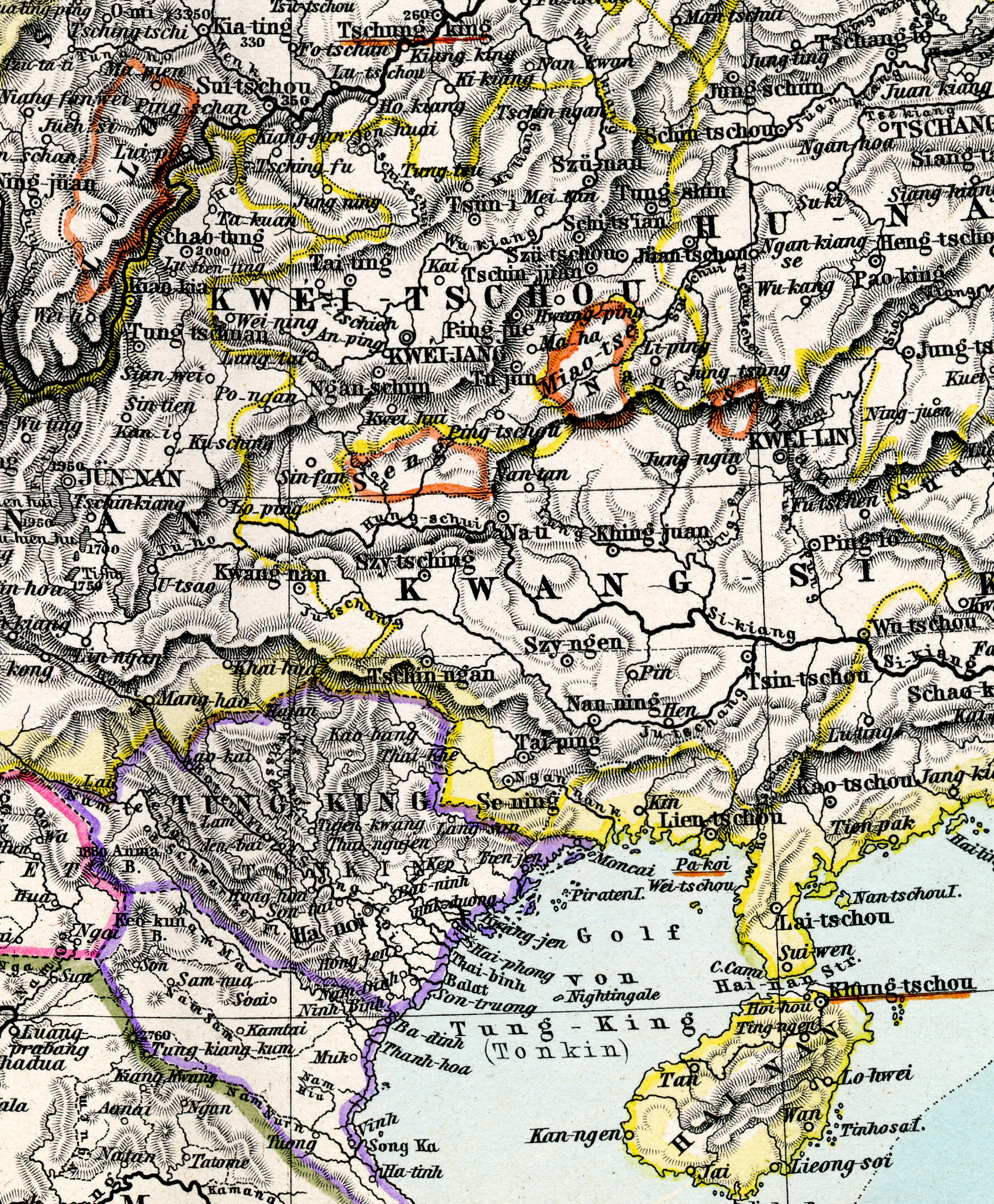
Detail from Stielers Hand-Atlas, 1891, showing Sheng Miao (生苗) and "Miao-tse" (苗子) enclaves between Guiyang and Guilin. The Miao-tse enclave corresponds to modern Congjiang and Rongjiang counties.

According to the 2020 census, the number of Miao in China was estimated to be about 11 million. Outside of China, members of the Miao sub-group or nations of the Hmong live in Thailand, Laos, Vietnam and Burma due to outward migrations starting in the 18th century. As a result of recent migrations in the aftermath of the Indochina and Vietnam Wars from 1949 to 1975, many Hmong people now live in the United States, French Guiana, France and Australia. Altogether, there are approximately 10 million speakers in the Miao language family. This language family, which consists of 6 languages and around 35 dialects (some of which are mutually intelligible) belongs to the Hmong/Miao branch of the Hmong–Mien (Miao–Yao) language family.

A large population of the Hmong have emigrated to the northern mountainous reaches of Southeast Asia including Thailand, Laos, Vietnam, and Burma. However, many continue to live in far Southwest China mostly in the provinces of Yunnan, Guangxi and to a very limited extent in Guizhou.

Note: The Miao areas of Sichuan province became part of the newly created Chongqing Municipality in 1997.

Most Miao currently live in China. Miao population growth in China:

- 1953: 2,510,000
- 1964: 2,780,000
- 1982: 5,030,000
- 1990: 7,390,000

3,600,000 Miao, about half of the entire Chinese Miao population, were in Guizhou in 1990. The Guizhou Miao and those in the following six provinces make up over 98% of all Chinese Miao:

- Hunan: 1,550,000
- Yunnan: 890,000
- Sichuan: 530,000
- Guangxi: 420,000
- Hubei: 200,000
- Hainan: 50,000 (known as Miao but ethnically Yao and Li)

In the above provinces, there are 6 Miao autonomous prefectures (shared officially with one other ethnic minority):

- Qiandongnan Miao and Dong Autonomous Prefecture, Guizhou
- Qiannan Buyei and Miao Autonomous Prefecture, Guizhou
- Qianxinan Buyei and Miao Autonomous Prefecture, Guizhou
- Xiangxi Tujia and Miao Autonomous Prefecture, Hunan
- Wenshan Zhuang and Miao Autonomous Prefecture, Yunnan
- Enshi Tujia and Miao Autonomous Prefecture, Hubei

There are in addition 23 Miao autonomous counties:

- Hunan: Mayang, Jingzhou, Chengbu
- Guizhou: Songtao, Yinjiang, Wuchuan, Daozhen, Zhenning, Ziyun, Guanling, Weining
- Yunnan: Pingbian, Jinping, Luquan
- Chongqing: Xiushan, Youyang, Qianjiang, Pengshui
- Guangxi: Rongshui, Longsheng, Longlin (including Hmong)
- Hainan: Qiongzhong and Baoting

Most Miao reside in hills or on mountains, such as

- Wuling Mountain by the Qianxiang River (湘黔川边的武陵山; Xiāngqián Chuān Biān Dí Wǔlíng Shān)
- Miao Mountain (苗岭; Miáo Líng), Qiandongnan
- Yueliang Mountain (月亮山; Yuèliàng Shān), Qiandongnan
- Greater and Lesser Ma Mountain (大小麻山; Dà Xiǎo Má Shān), Qiannan
- Greater Miao Mountain (大苗山; Dà Miáo Shān), Guangxi
- Wumeng Mountain by the Tianqian River (滇黔川边的乌蒙山; Tiánqián Chuān Biān Dí Wūmēng Shān)

Several thousands of Miao left their homeland to move to larger cities like Guangzhou and Beijing. There are 789,000 Hmong spread throughout northern Vietnam, Laos, Burma, and on other continents. 174,000 live in Thailand, where they are one of the six main hill tribes.

== Distribution ==
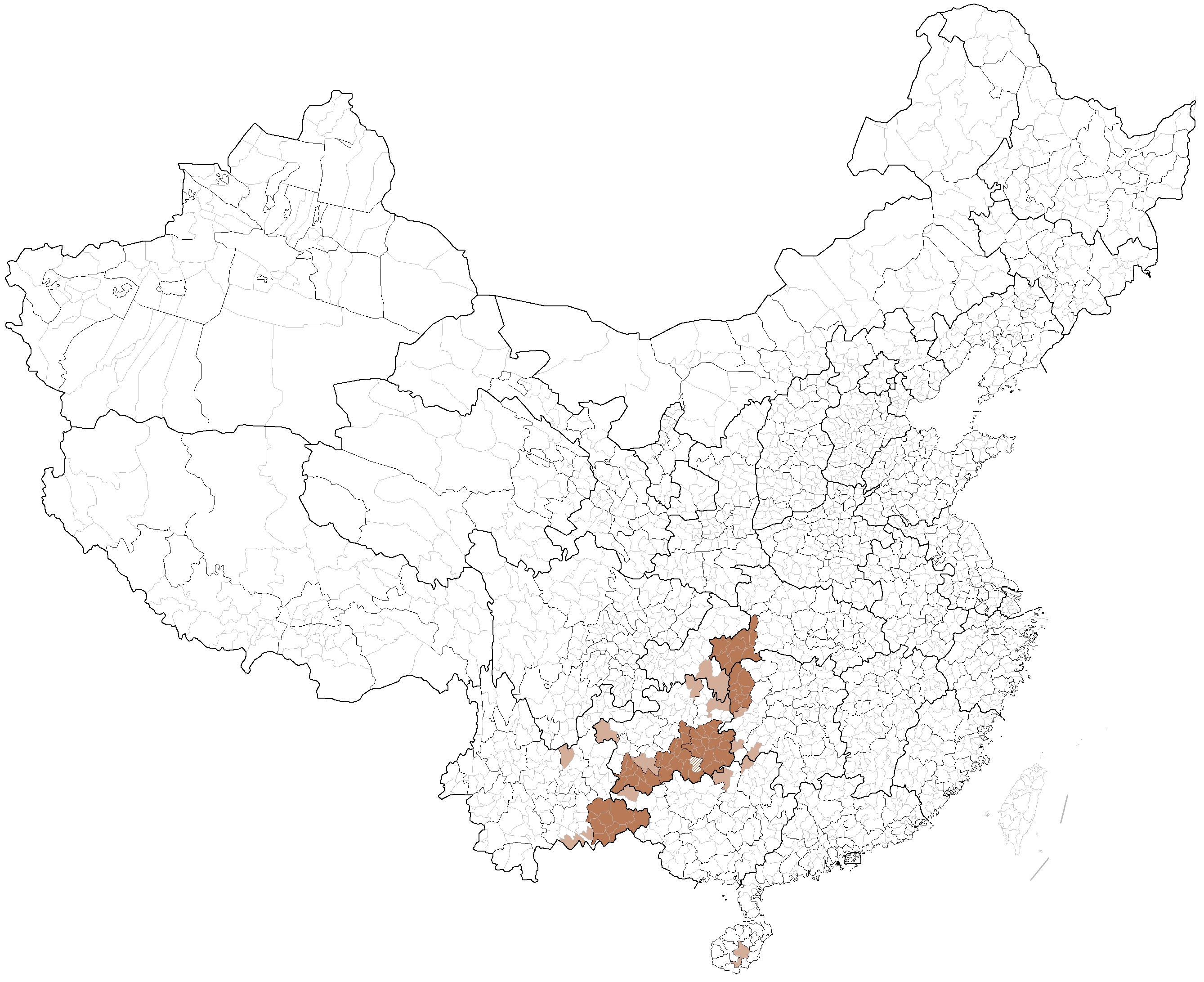
Miao autonomous prefectures and counties in China

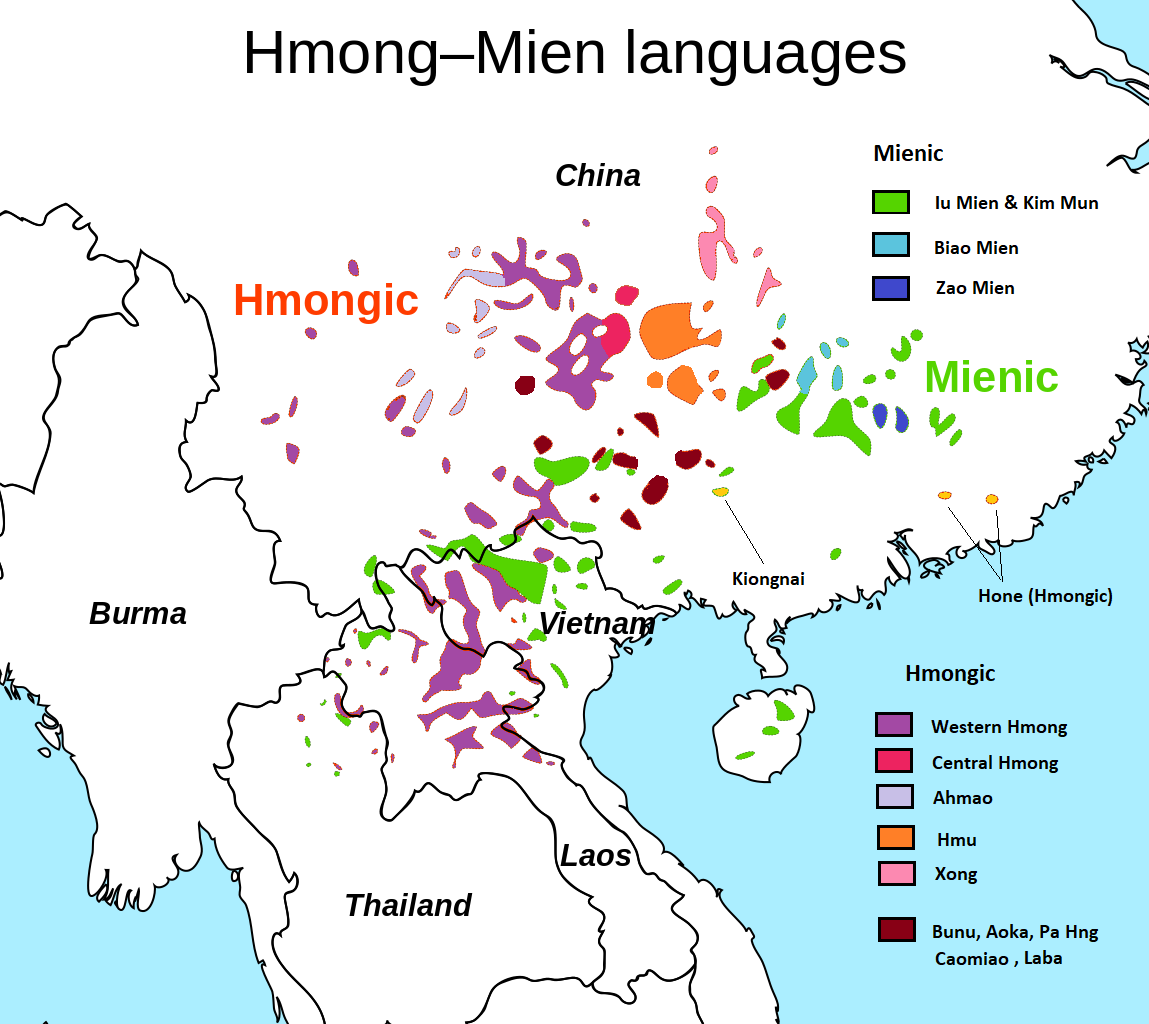
Map of Hmong-Mien languages distribution

=== By province ===
The 2020 Chinese census recorded 11,067,929 Miao in China.

Provincial distribution of the Miao in China

Province-level division	% of China's Miao population	% of provincial total
Guizhou Province	48.10%	12.199%
Hunan Province	21.49%	3.037%
Yunnan Province	11.67%	2.463%
Chongqing Municipality	5.62%	1.647%
Guangxi Zhuang Autonomous Region	5.18%	1.056%
Hubei Province	2.40%	0.360%
Sichuan Province	1.65%	0.179%
Guangdong Province	1.35%	0.142%
Hainan Province	0.69%	0.810%
Others	1.85%	N/A

=== By county ===
County-level distribution of the Miao in China

(Only includes counties or county-equivalents containing >0.25% of China's Miao population.)

Province-level division	Prefecture-level division	County-level division	Miao population	Miao as percentage of county population	% of China's Miao population
Guizhou	Qiandongnan Miao and Dong A. P.	Kaili City (凯里市)	274,238	49.5%	3.07%
Chongqing Municipality		Pengshui Miao and Tujia A. C. (彭水苗族土家族自治县)	273,488	50.2%	3.06%
Hunan	Huaihua City	Mayang Miao A. C. (麻阳苗族自治县)	263,437	76.7%	2.95%
Guizhou	Tongren City	Songtao Miao A. C. (松桃苗族自治县)	228,718	47%	2.56%
Hunan	Huaihua City	Yuanling County (沅陵县)	217,613	37.4%	2.43%
Hunan	Xiangxi Tujia and Miao A. P.	Huayuan County (花垣县)	192,138	66.7%	2.15%
Hunan	Xiangxi Tujia and Miao A. P.	Fenghuang County (凤凰县)	185,111	52.9%	2.07%
Hunan	Shaoyang City	Suining County (绥宁县)	184,784	51.8%	2.07%
Guangxi Zhuang A. R.	Liuzhou City	Rongshui Miao A. C. (融水苗族自治县)	168,591	41.9%	1.89%
Guizhou	Qiandongnan Miao and Dong A. P.	Huangping County (黄平县)	161,211	61.3%	1.8%
Guizhou	Zunyi City	Wuchuan Gelao and Miao A. C. (务川仡佬族苗族自治县)	157,350	48.9%	1.76%
Hunan	Shaoyang City	Chengbu Miao A. C. (城步苗族自治县)	136,943	46.9%	1.53%
Guizhou	Qiandongnan Miao and Dong A. P.	Taijiang County (台江县)	135,827	81.2%	1.52%
Guizhou	Qiandongnan Miao and Dong A. P.	Congjiang County (从江县)	129,626	44.6%	1.45%
Guizhou	Liupanshui City	Shuicheng County (水城县) (incl. Zhongshan District)	126,319	17.9%	1.41%
Hunan	Huaihua City	Jingzhou Miao and Dong A. C. (靖州苗族侗族自治县)	114,641	46.8%	1.28%
Guizhou	Anshun City	Ziyun Miao and Buyei A. C. (紫云苗族布依族自治县)	114,444	42.3%	1.28%
Guizhou	Qiandongnan Miao and Dong A. P.	Jianhe County (剑河县)	112,950	62.6%	1.26%
Hunan	Xiangxi Tujia and Miao A. P.	Jishou City (吉首市)	112,856	37.4%	1.26%
Guizhou	Tongren City	Sinan County (思南县)	112,464	22.5%	1.26%
Guizhou	Qiandongnan Miao and Dong A. P.	Leishan County (雷山县)	110,413	93.0%	1.24%
Hunan	Xiangxi Tujia and Miao A. P.	Luxi County (泸溪县)	107,301	39.3%	1.2%
Guizhou	Qiandongnan Miao and Dong A. P.	Tianzhu County (天柱县)	106,387	40.3%	1.19%
Guizhou	Qiandongnan Miao and Dong A. P.	Danzhai County (丹寨县)	104,934	85.7%	1.17%
Guizhou	Qiandongnan Miao and Dong A. P.	Rongjiang County (榕江县)	96,503	27.5%	1.08%
Guizhou	Qiannan Buyei and Miao A. P.	Huishui County (惠水县)	91,215	26.6%	1.02%
Yunnan	Wenshan Zhuang and Miao A. P.	Guangnan County (广南县)	88,444	11.2%	0.99%
Chongqing Municipality		Youyang Tujia and Miao A. C. (酉阳土家族苗族自治县)	85,182	14.7%	0.95%
Guangxi Zhuang A. R.	Bose City	Longlin Various Nationalities A. C. (隆林各族自治县)	84,617	19.3%	0.95%
Guizhou	Bijie City	Zhijin County (织金县)	81,029	10.3%	0.91%
Yunnan	Honghe Hani and Yi A. P.	Jinping Miao, Yao, and Dai A. C. (金平苗族瑶族傣族自治县)	80,820	22.7%	0.9%
Guizhou	Anshun City	Xixiu District (西秀区)	79,906	10.4%	0.89%
Guizhou	Qiandongnan Miao and Dong A. P.	Jinping County (锦屏县)	78,441	22.7%	0.88%
Guizhou	Zunyi City	Daozhen Gelao and Miao A. C. (道真仡佬族苗族自治县)	76,658	31.4%	0.86%
Guizhou	Qiandongnan Miao and Dong A. P.	Liping County (黎平县)	75,718	14.1%	0.85%
Yunnan	Wenshan Zhuang and Miao A. P.	Maguan County (马关县)	73,833	20.1%	0.83%
Guizhou	Bijie City	Nayong County (纳雍县)	72,845	10.9%	0.81%
Guizhou	Qiannan Buyei and Miao A. P.	Duyun City (都匀市)	71,011	14.4%	0.79%
Hubei	Enshi Tujia and Miao A. P.	Laifeng County (来凤县)	70,679	29.1%	0.79%
Guizhou	Qiandongnan Miao and Dong A. P.	Majiang County (麻江县)	68,847	41.1%	0.77%
Chongqing Municipality		Xiushan Tujia and Miao A. C. (秀山土家族苗族自治县)	66,895	13.3%	0.75%
Guizhou	Qiandongnan Miao and Dong A. P.	Shibing County (施秉县)	66,890	51.3%	0.75%
Yunnan	Wenshan Zhuang and Miao A. P.	Qiubei County (丘北县)	66,826	14%	0.75%
Guizhou	Guiyang City	Huaxi District (花溪区)	62,827	10.3%	0.7%
Hunan	Xiangxi Tujia and Miao A. P.	Longshan County (龙山县)	61,709	12.3%	0.69%
Guizhou	Bijie City	Qianxi County (黔西县)	60,409	8.7%	0.68%
Yunnan	Honghe Hani and Yi A. P.	Pingbian Miao A. C. (屏边苗族自治县)	60,312	39.2%	0.67%
Guizhou	Bijie City	Weining Yi, Hui, and Miao A. C. (威宁彝族回族苗族自治县)	60,157	4.8%	0.67%
Chongqing Municipality		Qianjiang District (黔江区)	59,705	13.4%	0.67%
Hunan	Xiangxi Tujia and Miao A. P.	Baojing County (保靖县)	57,468	20.7%	0.64%
Yunnan	Wenshan Zhuang and Miao A. P.	Wenshan County (文山县)	57,303	11.9%	0.64%
Hunan	Xiangxi Tujia and Miao A. P.	Guzhang County (古丈县)	54,554	37.7%	0.61%
Hubei	Enshi Tujia and Miao A. P.	Lichuan City (利川市)	53,590	8.2%	0.6%
Guizhou	Qianxinan Buyei and Miao A. P.	Qinglong County (晴隆县)	53,205	21.6%	0.6%
Guangxi Zhuang A. R.	Liuzhou City	Sanjiang Dong A. C. (三江侗族自治县)	53,076	17.9%	0.59%
Guizhou	Bijie City	Dafang County (大方县)	52,547	6.8%	0.59%
Yunnan	Wenshan Zhuang and Miao A. P.	Yanshan County (砚山县)	51,624	11.1%	0.58%
Guizhou	Liupanshui City	Liuzhi Special District (六枝特区)	50,833	10.3%	0.57%
Guizhou	Qiannan Buyei and Miao A. P.	Changshun County (长顺县)	48,902	25.6%	0.55%
Guizhou	Qiannan Buyei and Miao A. P.	Fuquan City (福泉市)	48,731	17.2%	0.55%
Yunnan	Honghe Hani and Yi A. P.	Mengzi County (蒙自县)	48,132	11.5%	0.54%
Guizhou	Tongren City	Bijiang District (碧江区)	47,080	13%	0.53%
Yunnan	Wenshan Zhuang and Miao A. P.	Malipo County (麻栗坡县)	45,655	16.4%	0.51%
Yunnan	Zhaotong City	Yiliang County (彝良县)	44,736	8.6%	0.5%
Guizhou	Anshun City	Pingba County (平坝县)	44,107	14.8%	0.49%
Guizhou	Qiannan Buyei and Miao A. P.	Sandu Shui A. C. (三都水族自治县)	43,464	15.4%	0.49%
Guizhou	Qiannan Buyei and Miao A. P.	Guiding County (贵定县)	42,450	18.4%	0.47%
Guizhou	Tongren City	Yinjiang Tujia and Miao A. C. (印江土家族苗族自治县)	42,431	14.9%	0.47%
Guizhou	Qiannan Buyei and Miao A. P.	Longli County (龙里县)	40,096	22.2%	0.45%
Guizhou	Guiyang City	Qingzhen City (清镇市)	39,845	8.5%	0.45%
Guizhou	Qianxinan Buyei and Miao A. P.	Wangmo County (望谟县)	39,491	15.7%	0.44%
Guizhou	Bijie City	Qixingguan District (七星关区)	38,508	3.4%	0.43%
Hunan	Xiangxi Tujia and Miao A. P.	Yongshun County (永顺县)	37,676	8.8%	0.42%
Guizhou	Bijie City	Hezhang County (赫章县)	37,128	5.7%	0.42%
Yunnan	Zhaotong City	Weixin County (威信县)	36,293	9.4%	0.41%
Guizhou	Qiandongnan Miao and Dong A. P.	Sansui County (三穗县)	35,745	23%	0.4%
Guizhou	Qiannan Buyei and Miao A. P.	Luodian County (罗甸县)	35,463	13.8%	0.4%
Guizhou	Anshun City	Zhenning Buyei and Miao A. C. (镇宁布依族苗族自治县)	34,379	12.1%	0.38%
Hubei	Enshi Tujia and Miao A. P.	Xuan'en County (宣恩县)	34,354	9.6%	0.38%
Hunan	Huaihua City	Huitong County (会同县)	33,977	10.7%	0.38%
Guizhou	Qianxinan Buyei and Miao A. P.	Anlong County (安龙县)	32,926	9.2%	0.37%
Guizhou	Bijie City	Jinsha County (金沙县)	31,884	5.7%	0.36%
Sichuan	Luzhou City	Xuyong County (叙永县)	30,362	5.2%	0.34%
Guizhou	Anshun City	Puding County (普定县)	30,254	8%	0.34%
Sichuan	Yibin City	Xingwen County (兴文县)	30,020	8%	0.34%
Guizhou	Anshun City	Guanling Buyei and Miao A. C. (关岭布依族苗族自治县)	29,746	9.9%	0.33%
Guangxi Zhuang A. R.	Bose City	Xilin County (西林县)	28,967	19.25	0.32%
Guangxi Zhuang A. R.	Guilin City	Ziyuan County (资源县)	27,827	16.4%	0.31%
Hubei	Enshi Tujia and Miao A. P.	Xianfeng County (咸丰县)	27,668	9.2%	0.31%
Guizhou	Guiyang City	Nanming District (南明区)	27,460	3.3%	0.31%
Yunnan	Zhaotong City	Zhenxiong County (镇雄县)	26,963	1.8%	0.3%
Yunnan	Wenshan Zhuang and Miao A. P.	Funing County (富宁县)	26,396	6.5%	0.3%
Guangdong	Dongguan City	Dongguan District (东莞市辖区)	26,241	<1%	0.29%
Guizhou	Tongren City	Jiangkou County (江口县)	25,588	14.8%	0.29%
Guizhou	Liupanshui City	Pan County (盘县)	25,428	2.5%	0.28%
Guangxi Zhuang A. R.	Guilin City	Longsheng Various Nationalities A. C. (龙胜各族自治县)	24,841	14.7%	0.28%
Guizhou	Qianxinan Buyei and Miao A. P.	Xingren County (兴仁县)	24,130	5.8%	0.27%
Hunan	Huaihua City	Zhijiang Dong A. C. (芷江侗族自治县)	23,698	7%	0.27%
Yunnan	Honghe Hani and Yi A. P.	Kaiyuan City (开远市)	23,504	7.9%	0.26%
Guizhou	Qianxinan Buyei and Miao A. P.	Zhenfeng County (贞丰县)	23,054	7.6%	0.26%
Guizhou	Qiannan Buyei and Miao A. P.	Pingtang County (平塘县)	22,980	10.1%	0.26%
Guizhou	Qiandongnan Miao and Dong A. P.	Zhenyuan County (镇远县)	22,883	11.2%	0.26%
Guizhou	Qianxinan Buyei and Miao A. P.	Pu'an County (普安县)	22,683	8.9%	0.25%
Guizhou	Guiyang City	Wudang District (乌当区)	22,468	6%	0.25%
Other areas of China			1,246,040		13.94%

== Cuisine ==
Miao fish (苗鱼 miáo yǘ) is a dish made by steaming fish with a mixture of fresh herbs, green peppers, ginger slices and garlic.

== Genetics ==
Huang et al. (2022) found that the most common Y-chromosome haplogroup among many Hmongic-speaking ethnic groups (including Miao and Pa-Hng from Hunan, and Thailand Hmong) is O2a2a2a1a2a1a2-N5 (a subclade of O2a2a-M188), with a frequency of 47.1% among the Guangxi Miao.

== See also ==
- Chiyou
- Ethnic groups in Chinese history
- Ethnic minorities in China
- History of China
- Hmong people
- Hmong customs and culture
- Hmong–Mien languages
- Languages of China
- List of Hmong/Miao People
- Single bamboo drifting
- Pole worship
- Vang Pao
