= Xiaoba, Guizhou =

Xiaoba 小坝镇
- Town
- Location within Guizhou Location within China
- Coordinates: 27.3330°N 105.5099°E
- Country: People's Republic of China
- Autonomous region: Guizhou
- Prefecture-level city: Bijie
- District: Qixingguan District
- Time zone: UTC+8 (China Standard)

Xiaoba (simplified Chinese: 小坝; traditional Chinese: 小垻; pinyin: Xiǎobà) is a town under the administration of Qixingguan District, Bijie, Guizhou, China. As of 2018, it has 4 residential communities and 5 villages under its administration.

== See also ==
- List of township-level divisions of Guizhou
