= Chahe, Qixingguan District =

Chahe 岔河镇
- Town
- Location in Guizhou
- Coordinates: 27°10′10″N 105°22′45″E
- Country: People's Republic of China
- Province: Guizhou
- Prefecture-level city: Bijie
- District: Qixingguan District
- Time zone: UTC+8 (China Standard)

Chahe (Chinese: 岔河; pinyin: Chàhé) is a town in Qixingguan District, Bijie, Guizhou. As of 2020, it administers the following eight residential communities and seven villages:

- Chahe Community
- Tangfeng Community (塘丰社区)
- Wangjiaba Community (王家坝社区)
- Qiaobian Community (桥边社区)
- Shuanghua Community (双华社区)
- Dazhai Community (大寨社区)
- Chensi Community (晨思社区)
- Zuna Community (足纳社区)
- Yile Village (亦乐村)
- Mulai Village (木来村)
- Gele Village (戈乐村)
- Fayin Village (发音村)
- Falu Village (发路村)
- Qianzhai Village (浅寨村)
- Shalang Village (沙朗村)

== See also ==
- List of township-level divisions of Guizhou
