= Qixingguan, Bijie =

Qixingguan 七星关区
- District
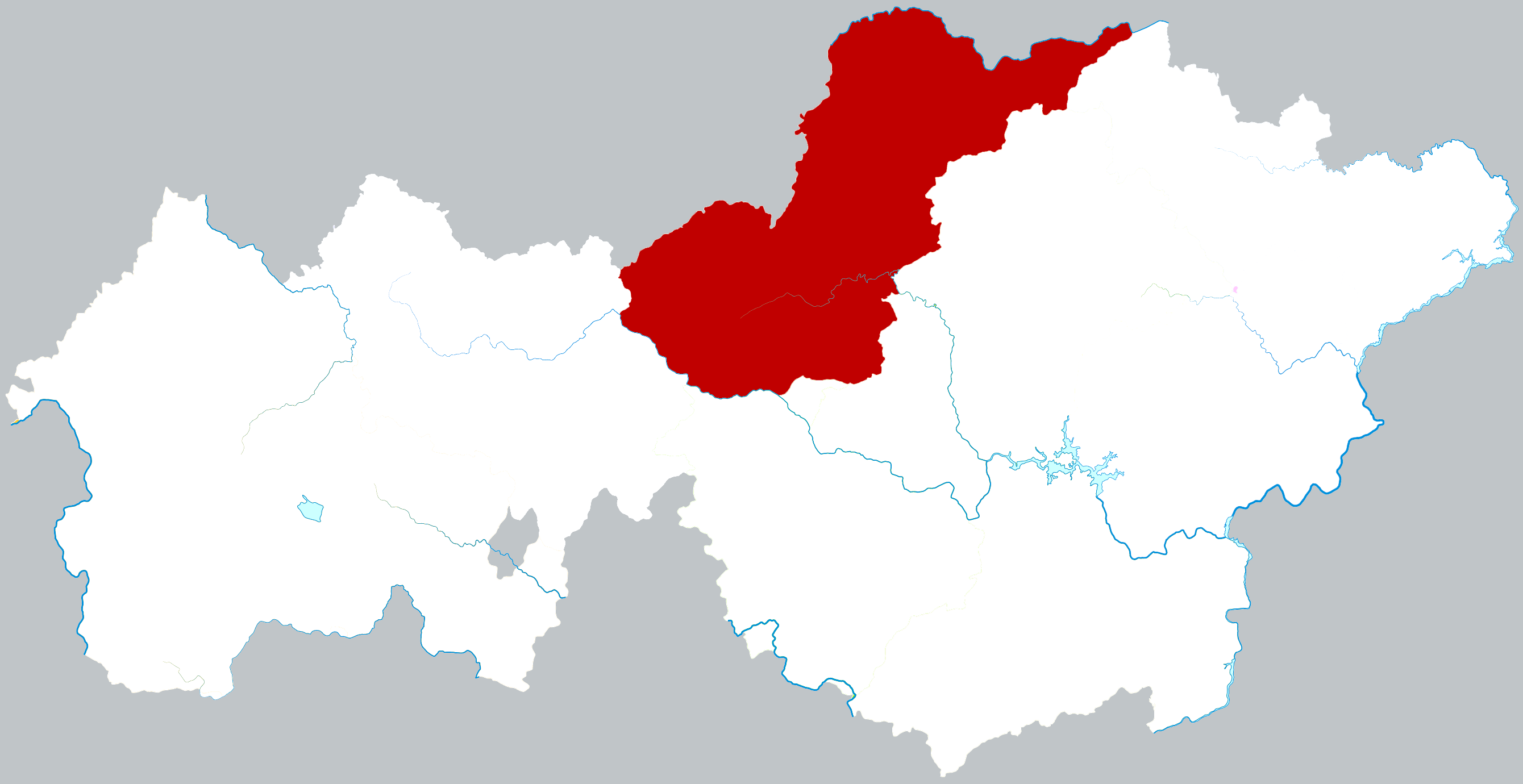
- Qixingguan in Bijie

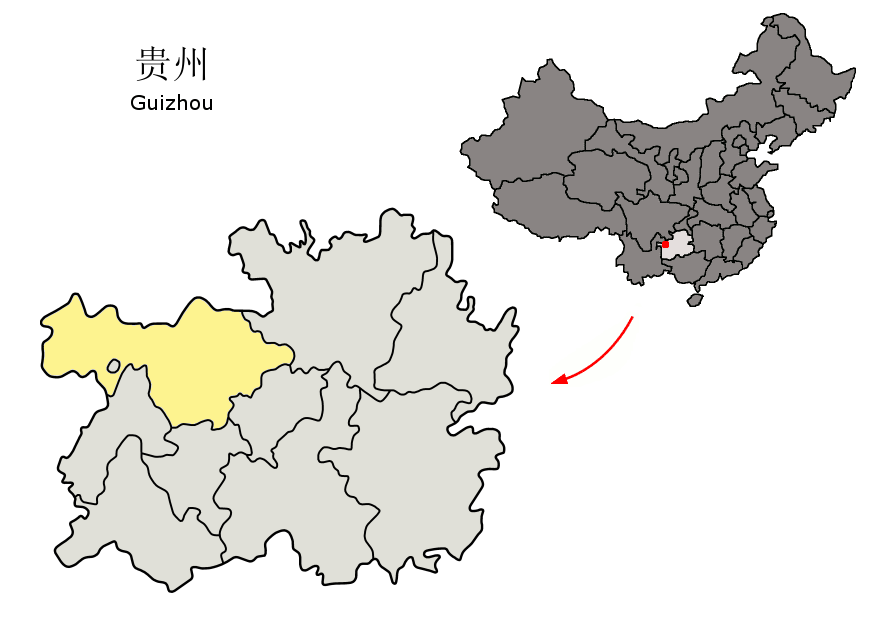
- Bijie in Guizhou

- Location within Guizhou Location within Southwest China
- Coordinates (Qixingguan District government): 27°17′54″N 105°18′17″E
- Country: China
- Province: Guizhou
- Prefecture-level city: Bijie
- District seat: Shidong Subdistrict

Area
  - Total: 3,414.9 km^{2} (1,318.5 sq mi)
- Elevation: 1,723 m (5,653 ft)

Population (2020 census)
  - Total: 1,305,066
  - Density: 382.17/km^{2} (989.81/sq mi)
- Time zone: UTC+8 (China Standard Time)
- Website: www.bjqixingguan.gov.cn

Qixingguan District (simplified Chinese: 七星关区; traditional Chinese: 七星關區; pinyin: Qīxīngguān Qū; lit. 'pass of seven stars') is the seat of the city of Bijie, Guizhou province, China. The total area of the district is 3,414.9 square kilometres (1,318.5 sq mi).

On 10 November 2011, Bijie Prefecture (毕节地区) was converted to a prefecture-level city, and the former Bijie City was rechristened Qixingguan District. Government officials hope that Qixingguan will become a distribution centre for all of southwest China and a base for new industries and tourism.

== Geography ==
Qixingguan is located in northwestern Guizhou, with longitude ranging from 104° 51′ to 105° 55′ E, latitude 27° 03′ to 27° 46′ N, with elevations generally above 1,600 metres (5,200 ft). It borders Sichuan and Yunnan.

== Administrative divisions ==
Qixingguan District is divided into 12 subdistricts, 27 towns, 2 townships and 6 ethnic townships:

subdistricts

- Shixi Subdistrict (市西街道)
- Shidong Subdistrict (市东街道)
- Sanbanqiao Subdistrict (三板桥街道)
- Daxinqiao Subdistrict (大新桥街道)
- Guanyinqiao Subdistrict (观音桥街道)
- Hongshan Subdistrict (洪山街道)
- Mayuan Subdistrict (麻园街道)
- Biyang Subdistrict (碧阳街道)
- Dexi Subdistrict (德溪街道)
- Bihai Subdistrict (碧海街道)
- Qinglong Subdistrict (青龙街道)
- Baiyanglin Subdistrict (柏杨林街道)

townships

- Yejiao Township (野角乡)
- Dahe Township (大河乡)

towns

- Yachi Town (鸭池镇)
- Lishu Town (梨树镇)
- Chahe Town (岔河镇)
- Zhuchang Town (朱昌镇)
- Tianba Town (田坝镇)
- Changchunbao Town (长春堡镇)
- Salaxi Town (撒拉溪镇)
- Yangjiawan Town (杨家湾镇)
- Fangzhu Town (放珠镇)
- Qingchang Town (青场镇)
- Shuijing Town (水箐镇)
- Heguantun Town (何官屯镇)
- Duipo Town (对坡镇)
- Dayin Town (大银镇)
- Linkou Town (林口镇)
- Shengji Town (生机镇)
- Qingshuipu Town (清水铺镇)
- Liangyan Town (亮岩镇)
- Yanzikou Town (燕子口镇)
- Bazhai Town (八寨镇)
- Tianbaqiao Town (田坝桥镇)
- Haizijie Town (海子街镇)
- Xiaoba Town (小坝镇)
- Cengtai Town (层台镇)
- Xiaojichang Town (小吉场镇)
- Puyi Town (普宜镇)
- Longchangying Town (龙场营镇)

ethnic townships

- Qianxi Yi, Miao and Bai Ethnic Township (千溪彝族苗族白族乡)
- Yindi Yi, Miao and Bai Ethnic Township (阴底彝族苗族白族乡)
- Tuanjie Yi and Miao Ethnic Township (团结彝族苗族乡)
- Ashi Miao and Yi Ethnic Township (阿市苗族彝族乡)
- Datun Yi Ethnic Township (大屯彝族乡)
- Tiankan Yi Ethnic Township (田坎彝族乡)
