= Jinsha County =

Jinsha County 金沙县
- County
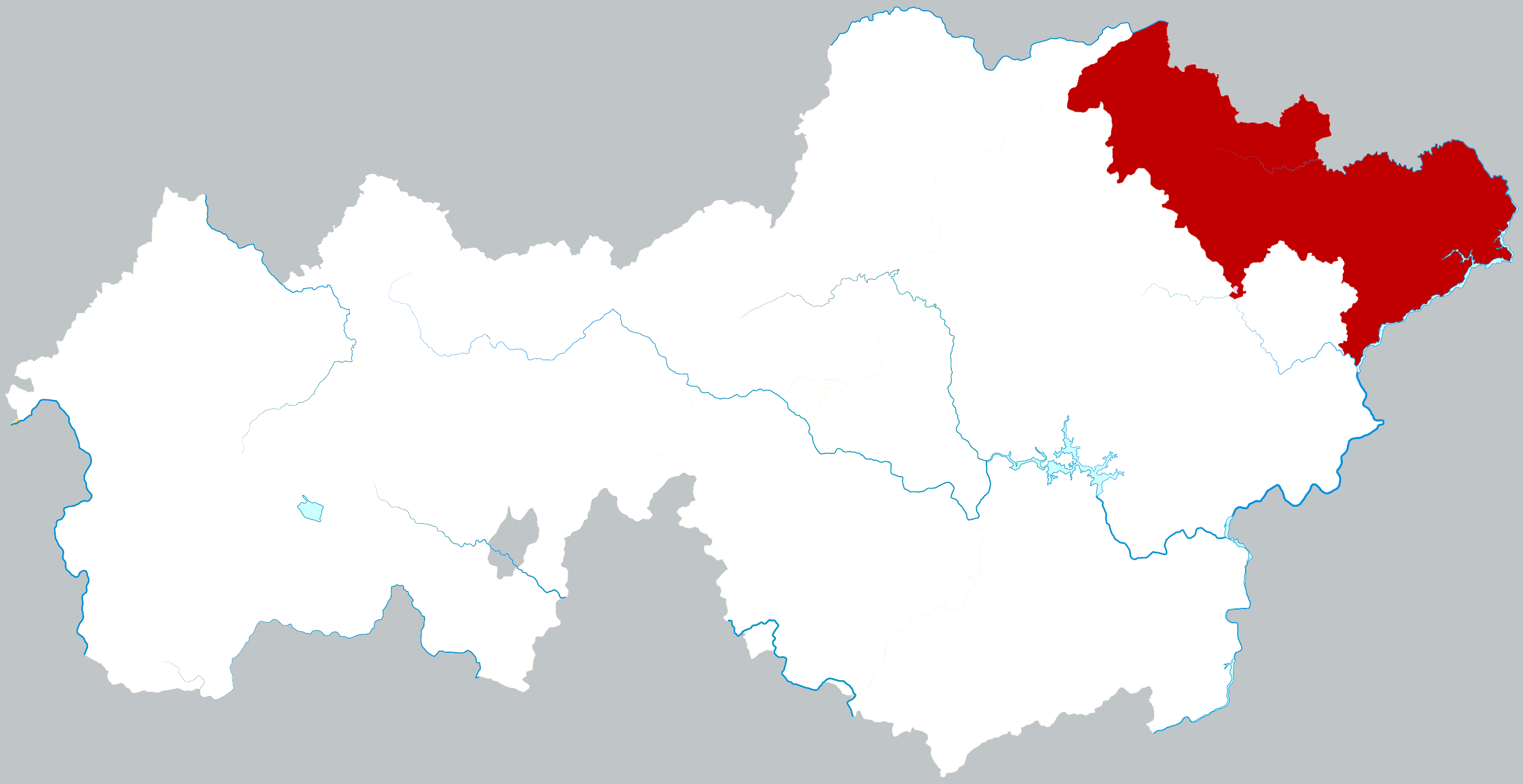
- Jinsha in Bijie

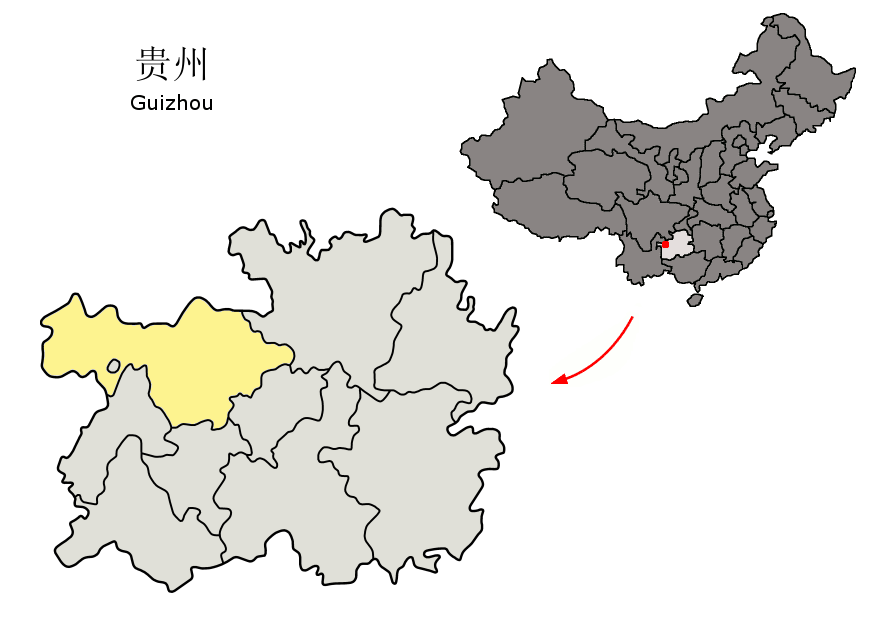
- Bijie in Guizhou
- Coordinates (Jinsha County government): 27°27′33″N 106°13′13″E
- Country: China
- Province: Guizhou
- Prefecture-level city: Bijie
- County seat: Guchang Subdistrict

Area
  - Total: 2,523.23 km^{2} (974.22 sq mi)

Population (2010)
  - Total: 560,575
  - Density: 222.166/km^{2} (575.406/sq mi)
- Time zone: UTC+8 (China Standard)

Jinsha (simplified Chinese: 金沙县; traditional Chinese: 金沙縣; pinyin: Jīnshā Xiàn) is a county in northwestern Guizhou province, China, bordering Sichuan to the north across the Chishui River. It is the easternmost county-level division of the prefecture-level city of Bijie.

== Administrative divisions ==
Jinsha County is divided into 15 subdistricts, 14 towns, 1 township and 6 ethnic townships:

Subdistricts

- Guchang Subdistrict 鼓场街道
- Yankong Subdistrict 岩孔街道
- Xiluo Subdistrict 西洛街道
- Wulong Subdistrict 五龙街道
- Minxing Subdistrict 民兴街道

township

- Guihua Township 桂花乡

Towns

- Andi Town 安底镇
- Shatu Town 沙土镇
- Yumo Town 禹谟镇
- Lantou Town 岚头镇
- Qingchi Town 清池镇
- Liutang Town 柳塘镇
- Pingba Town 平坝镇
- Yuancun Town 源村镇
- Mukong Town 木孔镇
- Changba Town 长坝镇
- Chayuan Town 茶园镇
- Houshan Town 后山镇
- Gaoping Town 高坪镇
- Huajue Town 化觉镇

Ethnic townships

- Shichang Miao and Yi Ethnic Township 石场苗族彝族乡
- Taiping Yi and Miao Ethnic Township 太平彝族苗族乡
- Anluo Miao, Yi and Manchu Ethnic Township 安洛苗族彝族满族乡
- Xinhua Miao, Yi and Manchu Ethnic Township 新化苗族彝族满族乡
- Datian Yi, Miao and Bouyei Ethnic Township 大田彝族苗族布依族乡
- Malu Yi and Miao Ethnic Township 马路彝族苗族乡

== Climate ==
Climate data for Jinsha, elevation 942 m (3,091 ft), (1991–2020 normals, extremes 1981–2010)
Month	Jan	Feb	Mar	Apr	May	Jun	Jul	Aug	Sep	Oct	Nov	Dec	Year
Record high °C (°F)	25.0 (77.0)	32.7 (90.9)	33.6 (92.5)	35.5 (95.9)	37.9 (100.2)	35.1 (95.2)	36.0 (96.8)	36.6 (97.9)	36.7 (98.1)	33.4 (92.1)	28.2 (82.8)	23.6 (74.5)	37.9 (100.2)
Mean daily maximum °C (°F)	7.5 (45.5)	10.7 (51.3)	15.6 (60.1)	21.3 (70.3)	24.8 (76.6)	26.8 (80.2)	29.9 (85.8)	30.0 (86.0)	26.0 (78.8)	19.8 (67.6)	15.4 (59.7)	9.5 (49.1)	19.8 (67.6)
Daily mean °C (°F)	4.6 (40.3)	7.0 (44.6)	11.1 (52.0)	16.2 (61.2)	19.7 (67.5)	22.4 (72.3)	24.9 (76.8)	24.4 (75.9)	21.0 (69.8)	16.0 (60.8)	11.5 (52.7)	6.4 (43.5)	15.4 (59.8)
Mean daily minimum °C (°F)	2.7 (36.9)	4.5 (40.1)	8.0 (46.4)	12.5 (54.5)	16.1 (61.0)	19.2 (66.6)	21.2 (70.2)	20.5 (68.9)	17.5 (63.5)	13.6 (56.5)	9.0 (48.2)	4.2 (39.6)	12.4 (54.4)
Record low °C (°F)	−4.9 (23.2)	−4.2 (24.4)	−2.8 (27.0)	2.7 (36.9)	5.9 (42.6)	12.1 (53.8)	12.2 (54.0)	13.7 (56.7)	9.0 (48.2)	4.5 (40.1)	−1.7 (28.9)	−5.6 (21.9)	−5.6 (21.9)
Average precipitation mm (inches)	30.6 (1.20)	24.7 (0.97)	43.9 (1.73)	72.3 (2.85)	124.9 (4.92)	179.4 (7.06)	180.2 (7.09)	119.2 (4.69)	101.4 (3.99)	92.0 (3.62)	36.7 (1.44)	26.6 (1.05)	1,031.9 (40.61)
Average precipitation days (≥ 0.1 mm)	17.0	15.3	17.4	16.6	17.1	16.7	13.9	12.2	13.4	17.3	12.8	14.3	184
Average snowy days	4.5	2.2	0.3	0	0	0	0	0	0	0	0.1	1.3	8.4
Average relative humidity (%)	85	83	81	79	78	81	78	77	79	84	84	84	81
Mean monthly sunshine hours	28.9	39.2	66.4	92.9	106.5	93.5	164.9	175.5	115.5	60.7	61.2	38.4	1,043.6
Percentage possible sunshine	9	12	18	24	25	23	39	44	32	17	19	12	23
Source: China Meteorological Administration
