= Bijie =

Bijie 毕节市 Pikieh, Pichieh
- Prefecture-level city
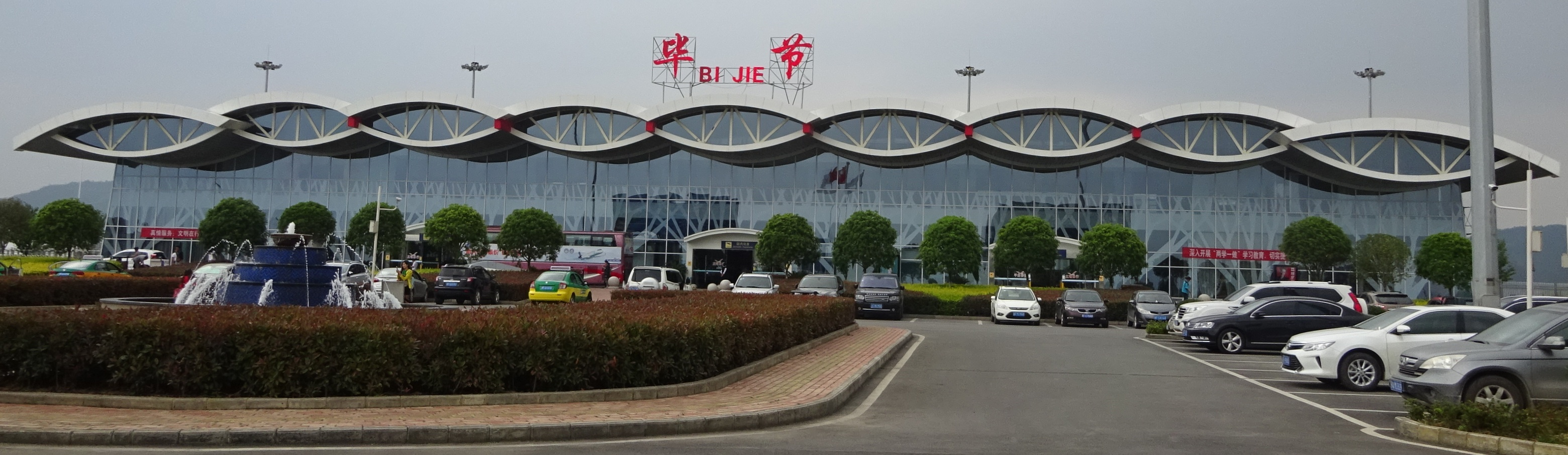
- Bijie Feixiong Airport

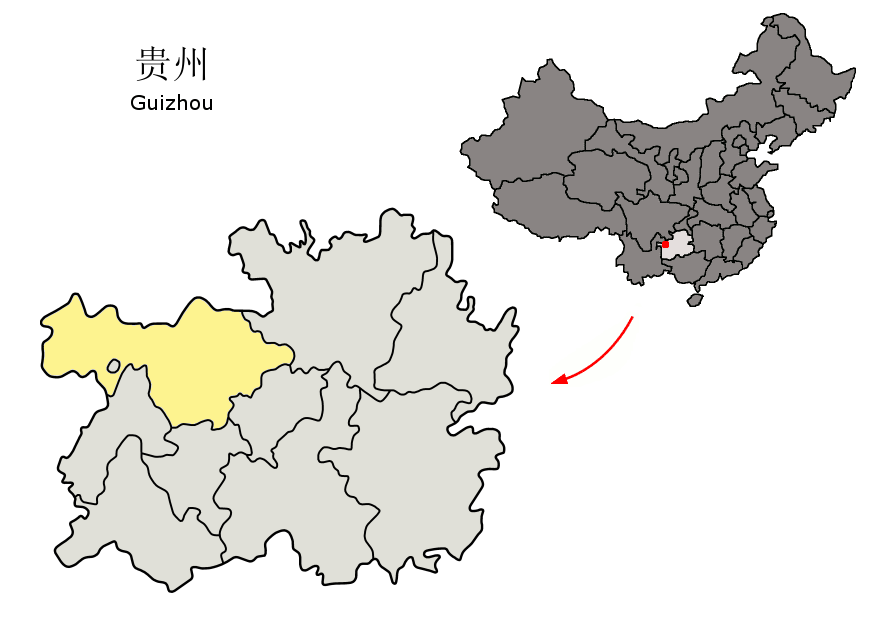
- Location of Bijie City jurisdiction in Guizhou

- Location of the city center in Guizhou Bijie (Southwest China)
- Coordinates (Bijie municipal government): 27°17′02″N 105°17′31″E
- Country: People's Republic of China
- Province: Guizhou
- Municipal seat: Qixingguan District

Area
  - Prefecture-level city: 26,853 km^{2} (10,368 sq mi)
  - Urban: 3,406 km^{2} (1,315 sq mi)
  - Metro: 3,406 km^{2} (1,315 sq mi)
- Elevation: 1,723 m (5,653 ft)

Population (2020 census)
  - Prefecture-level city: 6,899,636
  - Density: 256.94/km^{2} (665.47/sq mi)
  - Urban: 1,305,066
  - Urban density: 383.2/km^{2} (992.4/sq mi)
  - Metro: 1,305,066
  - Metro density: 383.2/km^{2} (992.4/sq mi)

GDP
  - Total: CN¥ 202 billion US$ 29.3 billion
  - Per capita: CN¥ 29,295; US$ 4,247
- Time zone: UTC+8 (China Standard)
- Postal code: 551700
- Area code: 0857
- ISO 3166 code: CN-GZ-05
- Licence plate prefixes: 贵F
- Website: bijie.gov.cn

Bijie (simplified Chinese: 毕节; traditional Chinese: 畢節; pinyin: Bìjíe) is a prefecture-level city in northwestern Guizhou Province, China, bordering Sichuan to the north and Yunnan to the west.

The Daotianhe Reservoir, located to the north of the town was commissioned in 1965 with a rated annual capacity of 6.5 million cubic meters.

On 10 November 2011, the former Bijie Prefecture (毕节地区) was converted to a prefecture-level city, and the former county-level city of Bijie was rechristened Qixingguan District.

== Geography and climate ==
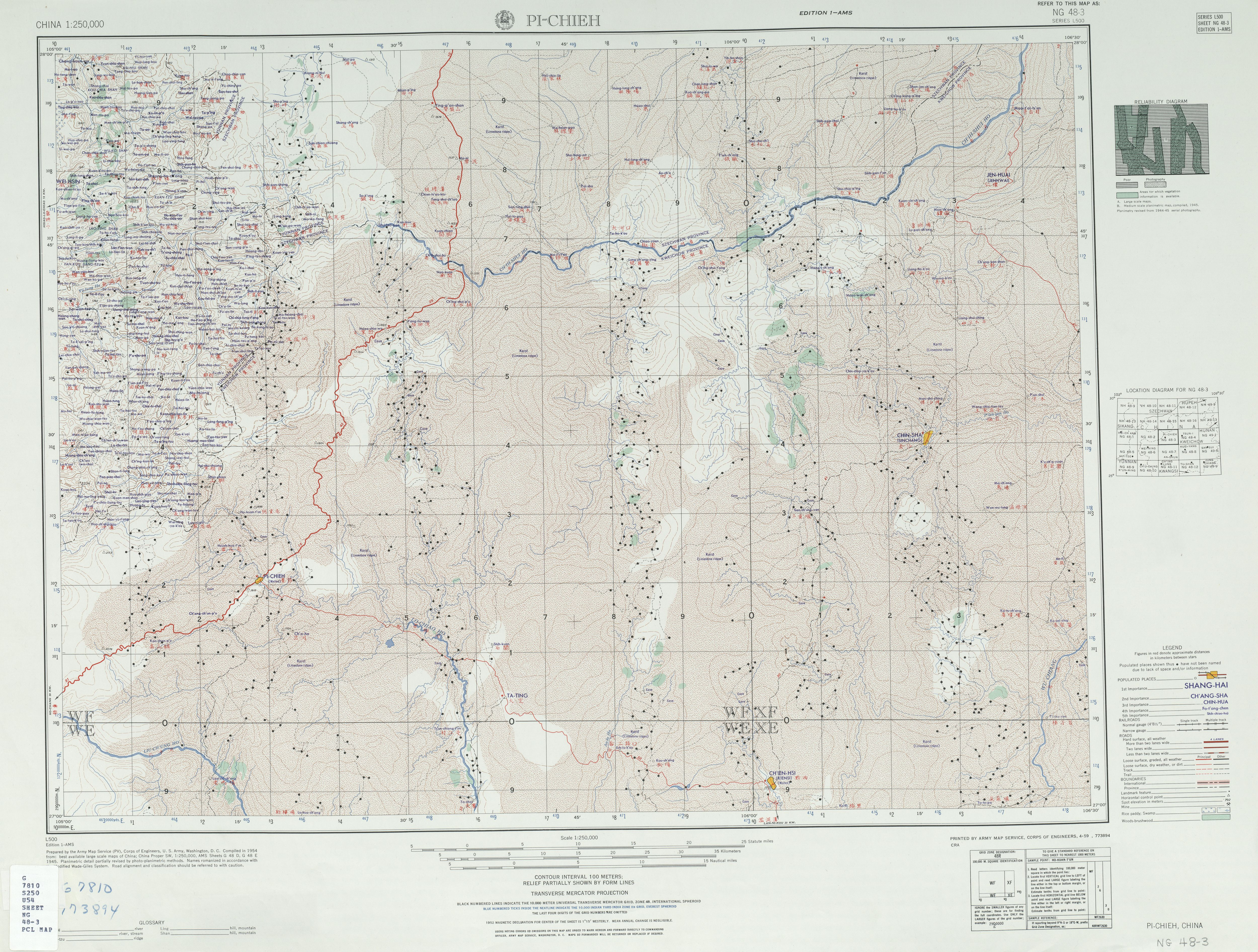
Map including Bijie (labeled as PI-CHIEH (Walled) 畢節) (AMS, 1954)

Bijie borders Zunyi to the east, Anshun and Liupanshui to the south, Zhaotong and Qujing (Yunnan) to the west, and Luzhou (Sichuan) to the north. It spans latitude 26°21′−27°46′ N and longitude 105°36′−106°43′ E, and is marked heavily by the presence of the Wumeng Mountains (乌蒙山) as well as karst topography. The Wu, Beipan, and Chishui Rivers are the most important rivers that originate here. The highest elevation is Jiucaiping (韭菜坪), at 2,900.6 m (9,516 ft), on the border of Hezhang and Weining counties.

Due to its low latitude and elevation above 1,700 m (5,600 ft), Bijie has a monsoon-influenced subtropical highland climate (Köppen Cwb), bordering on a humid subtropical climate (Köppen Cwa) with very warm, rainy summers and cool, damp winters. The monthly 24-hour average temperature ranges from 3.0 °C (37.4 °F) in January to 21.9 °C (71.4 °F) in July, while the annual mean is 13.3 °C (55.9 °F). Rainfall is very common year-round, occurring on 189 days of the year, but over half of the annual total (898 mm or 35.4 in) occurs from June to August. With monthly percent possible sunshine ranging from 14% in January to 40% in August, the city receives 1,162 hours of bright sunshine annually; spring is sunnier and features warmer daytime temperatures than autumn. Snow and ice are occasional hazards over winter, with a particularly severe event in January 2023.

Climate data for Bijie, elevation 1,511 m (4,957 ft), (1991–2020 normals, extremes 1951–present)
Month	Jan	Feb	Mar	Apr	May	Jun	Jul	Aug	Sep	Oct	Nov	Dec	Year
Record high °C (°F)	27.8 (82.0)	29.7 (85.5)	33.8 (92.8)	33.4 (92.1)	36.4 (97.5)	34.2 (93.6)	34.6 (94.3)	33.9 (93.0)	35.1 (95.2)	30.6 (87.1)	29.0 (84.2)	25.6 (78.1)	36.4 (97.5)
Mean daily maximum °C (°F)	6.7 (44.1)	10.2 (50.4)	14.9 (58.8)	19.9 (67.8)	22.9 (73.2)	24.7 (76.5)	27.2 (81.0)	27.0 (80.6)	23.6 (74.5)	18.1 (64.6)	14.3 (57.7)	8.5 (47.3)	18.2 (64.7)
Daily mean °C (°F)	3.0 (37.4)	5.4 (41.7)	9.5 (49.1)	14.3 (57.7)	17.5 (63.5)	19.8 (67.6)	21.9 (71.4)	21.4 (70.5)	18.5 (65.3)	13.8 (56.8)	9.7 (49.5)	4.6 (40.3)	13.3 (55.9)
Mean daily minimum °C (°F)	0.9 (33.6)	2.8 (37.0)	6.2 (43.2)	10.6 (51.1)	13.7 (56.7)	16.6 (61.9)	18.3 (64.9)	17.7 (63.9)	15.1 (59.2)	11.3 (52.3)	6.9 (44.4)	2.4 (36.3)	10.2 (50.4)
Record low °C (°F)	−8.2 (17.2)	−10.9 (12.4)	−5.8 (21.6)	−3.9 (25.0)	3.7 (38.7)	6.9 (44.4)	8.9 (48.0)	9.5 (49.1)	6.3 (43.3)	−0.2 (31.6)	−4.2 (24.4)	−8 (18)	−10.9 (12.4)
Average precipitation mm (inches)	16.8 (0.66)	14.6 (0.57)	30.2 (1.19)	58.5 (2.30)	95.0 (3.74)	157.3 (6.19)	177.3 (6.98)	148.4 (5.84)	92.5 (3.64)	70.5 (2.78)	23.4 (0.92)	13.0 (0.51)	897.5 (35.32)
Average precipitation days (≥ 0.1 mm)	18.0	14.8	15.4	15.6	16.5	18.1	15.1	14.8	14.5	18.5	12.1	15.8	189.2
Average snowy days	7.7	4.8	1.2	0	0	0	0	0	0	0	0.7	3.6	18
Average relative humidity (%)	85	83	79	77	76	81	79	79	80	85	83	85	81
Mean monthly sunshine hours	45.9	60.3	90.8	115.0	117.2	97.8	156.8	161.6	119.5	68.0	77.8	51.7	1,162.4
Percentage possible sunshine	14	19	24	30	28	24	37	40	33	19	24	16	26
Source: China Meteorological Administration extremes

== Administration ==
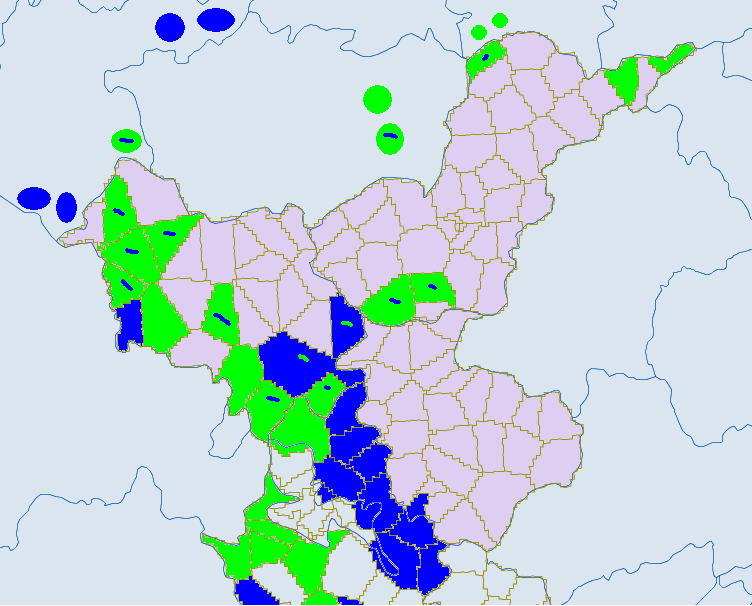
Ethnic townships in Bijie. Light green -Yi. Blue – miao. Dark green- Bouyei

Bijie City consists of one district, one county-level city, five counties and one autonomous county. These are:

- Qixingguan District (七星关区; Qīxīngguān Qū);
- Qianxi City (黔西市; Qiánxī Shì);
- Dafang County (大方县; Dàfāng Xiàn);
- Jinsha County (金沙县; Jīnshā Xiàn);
- Zhijin County (织金县; Zhījīn Xiàn);
- Nayong County (纳雍县; Nàyōng Xiàn);
- Hezhang County (赫章县; Hèzhāng Xiàn);
- Weining Yi Hui and Miao Autonomous County (威宁彝族回族苗族自治县; Wēiníng yízú huízú Miáozú Zìzhìxiàn).

Map
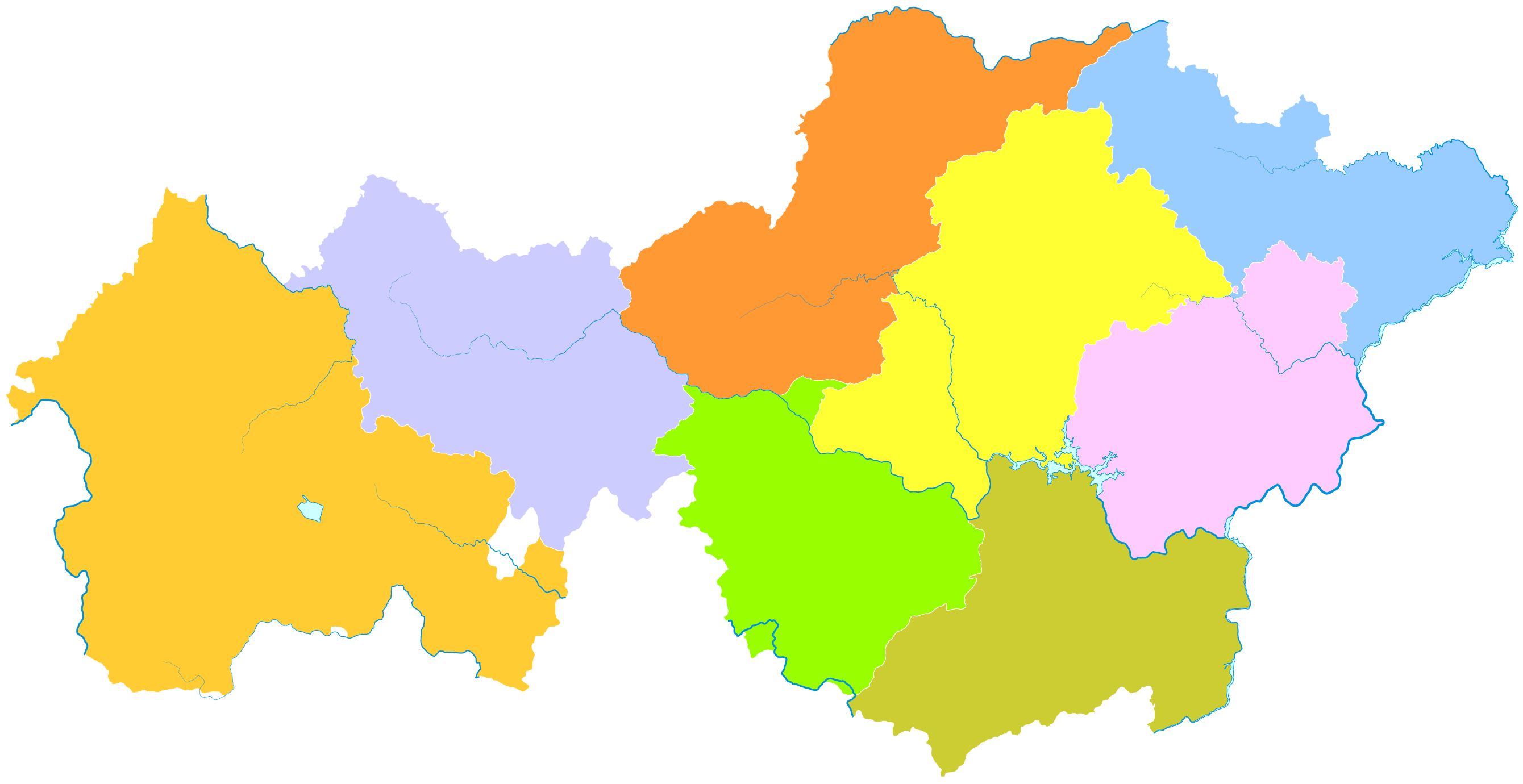

== Demographics ==
Demographics of Bijie City
Division name				
Division name	Permanent residents (Nov. 2010)			Hukou population (Late 2010)
Division name	Total	Percentage	Population density (/km^{2})	Hukou population (Late 2010)
Bijie City	6,536,370	100	243.41	8,338,858
Qixingguan District	1,136,905	17.39	333.21	1,483,697
Dafang County	776,246	11.88	221.66	1,080,406
Qianxi County	695,735	10.64	272.41	914,025
Jinsha County	560,651	8.58	221.78	669,661
Zhijin County	783,951	11.99	273.44	1,086,150
Nayong County	669,781	10.25	273.60	938,435
Weining Yi Hui and Miao Autonomous County	1,263,816	19.34	200.73	1,392,117
Hezhang County	649,285	9.93	200.09	774,367

According to the 2010 Sixth National Census, Bijie City had a permanent resident population of 6,536,370, an increase of 208,899 (3.3% or 0.33% annually), 3,400,195 (52.02%) of which were male, producing a male-female ratio of 108.42:100. Children aged 0−14 numbered 2,029,934人 (31.06%), persons aged 15−64 numbered 4,018,583 (61.48), and seniors 65+ numbered 487,853 (7.46%). The urban population stood at 1,711,222 (26.18%). Persons of Han ethnicity numbered 4,824,015 (73.80%), while minorities formed the other 26.20%.

== Transport ==
At present the backbone of the transport network in Bijie City is formed by China National Highways 321 and 326. As of 2013, Bijie is the only prefecture-level city of Guizhou to lack rail service; this changed with the 2020 opening of the Leshan (Sichuan)−Guiyang Railway (成贵客运专线). Other projected rail lines are Bijie−Shuicheng−Xingyi (毕水兴铁路) and Zhaotong (Yunnan)−Weining−Bijie−Jinsha−Zunyi. The city is served by the Bijie Feixiong Airport (IATA: BFJ).

== Historical sites ==
Notable historical sites in Bijie include the following:

Historical inscriptions

- Ma'an Mountain, Qianxi Yi Cliff Inscription (黔西马鞍山彝文岩刻): located in Bakuaitian, Chengguan Township, Qianxi (黔西县城关镇八块田村)
- Wopo, Hezhang Cliff Inscription (赫章窝颇写字岩摩崖): located in Xique, Wopo Township, Hezhang (赫章县窝颇乡喜鹊)
- Qixingguan, Bijie Cliff Inscription (毕节七星关摩崖): located in Qixing Township (七星乡), along the border between Hezhang County and Qixingguan District
- Chekaiqing, Nayong Chinese-Yi Cliff Inscription (纳雍扯垲箐汉彝文摩崖石刻): located in Kaiqing, Poqi Township, Zhikun District (治昆区坡其乡垲箐村)
- Guanyindong, Jinsha Buddha Image Cliff Inscription (金沙观音洞佛像摩崖): located in Yankong (岩孔镇), near the local elementary school
- Qianxi "Reverse Cliff Inscription" (黔西"反字岩"): located in Zhongguan, Zhongjian Township (中建乡中广村)
- Dafang Shuixi Dadu River Bridge Inscription (大方水西大渡河桥碑): located on the banks of the Dadu River (大渡河) between Huangnitang (黄泥塘镇), Dafang County, and Aoshui Township (凹水乡), Qianxi County
- Dafang Hejia Bridge Yi Inscription (大方何家桥彝文碑): located on the banks of the Mudu River (墓都河) in Shishu Township (柿树乡)
- Dafang Mayi River Bridge Inscription (大方蚂蚁河桥碑): located on the Mayi River Bridge (蚂蚁河桥) in Songhe Township (松鹤乡)
- Dafang Yi Ancestral Origin Inscription (大方彝文祖源碑): located in Qingjiao, Shishu Township (柿树乡箐脚)
