= Zhusheng Bridge =

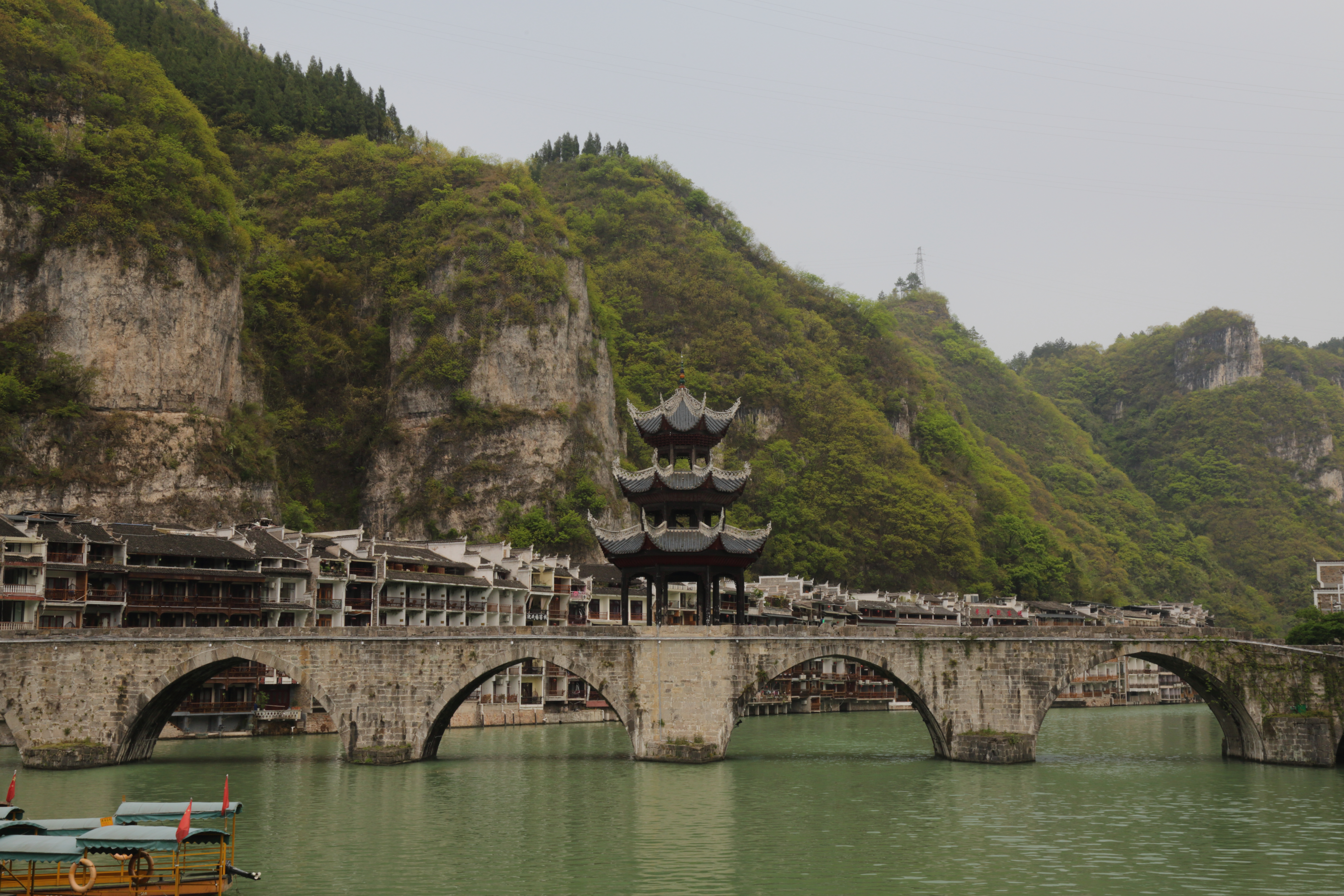
- Zhusheng_Bridge on April 1, 2020
- Coordinates: 27°03′23″N 108°26′19″E
- Crosses: Wu River
- Locale: Zhenyuan County, Guizhou, China

Characteristics
- Design: Arch bridge Stone bridge
- Total length: 135 m (443 ft)
- Width: 8.5 m (28 ft)
- Height: 14 m (46 ft)

History
- Construction end: 1723

Chinese name
- Traditional Chinese: 祝聖橋
- Simplified Chinese: 祝圣桥
Transcriptions
Standard Mandarin
- Hanyu Pinyin: Zhùshéng Qiáo

Stream Bridge
- Traditional Chinese: 溪橋
- Simplified Chinese: 溪桥
Transcriptions
Standard Mandarin
- Hanyu Pinyin: Xī Qiáo

Location
- Interactive map of Zhusheng Bridge

Zhusheng Bridge (Chinese: 祝圣桥; pinyin: Zhùshéng Qiáo) is a large stone arch bridge in Zhenyuan County, Guizhou, China. The bridge over the Wu River. It is 135 m (443 ft) long and 8.5 m (28 ft) wide. A Chinese pavilion named "Zhuangyuan Pavilion" (状元楼) or "Kuixing Pavilion" (魁星阁) on the bridge.

== History ==
Zhusheng Bridge was originally built in the Hongwu period (1368–1398) of the Ming dynasty (1368–1644). At that time it bore the name "Stream Bridge" (溪桥). It has been repaired several times due to floods. The present version was completed in 1723, in the 1st year of Yongzheng era (1723–1735) of the Qing dynasty (1644–1911).

In 1988, it was listed among the third group of "Major National Historical and Cultural Sites in Guizhou" by the State Council of China as a part of Qinglongdong Ancient Architectural Complex.
