= List of Major National Historical and Cultural Sites in Guizhou =

This list is of Major Sites Protected for their Historical and Cultural Value at the National Level in the Province of Guizhou, People's Republic of China.

Site	Chinese name	Location	Designation	Image
Site of the Zunyi Conference	Zunyi huiyi huizhi 遵义会议会址	Zunyi	1-21	Upload file
Tomb of Yang Can	Yang Can mu 杨粲墓	Zunyi	2-57	Upload file
Datun Tusi Estate	Datun Tusi zhuangyuan 大屯土司庄园	Bijie	3-73	Upload file
Zengchong Drum Tower	Zengchong gulou 增冲鼓楼	Congjiang County	3-104	Upload file
Qinglong Caves	Qinglong dong 青龙洞	Zhenyuan County	3-132	Upload file
Xifeng Concentration Camp	Xifeng jizhongying jiuzhi 息烽集中营旧址	Xifeng County	3-161	Upload file
Chuandong site	Chuandong yizhi 穿洞遗址	Puding County	3-186	Upload file
Tomb of Shexiang	Shexiang mu 奢香墓	Dafang County	3-251	Upload file
Dadong site	Dadong yizhi 大洞遗址	Pan County	4-4	Upload file
Guanyin Cave, Qianxi	Qianxi Guanyin dong yizhi 黔西观音洞遗址	Qianxi County	5-107	Upload file
Kele site	Kele yizhi 可乐遗址	Hezhang County	5-108	Upload file
Tiantaishan Wulong Temple	Tiantai shan Wulong si 天台山伍龙寺	Pingba County	5-396	Upload file
Shiqian Wanshou Palace	Shiqian Wanshou gong 石阡万寿宫	Shiqian County	5-397	Upload file
Old Architecture of Yunshantun	Yunshantun gu jianzhuqun 云山屯古建筑群	Anshun	5-398	Upload file
Fuquan City Wall	Fuquan chengqiang 福泉城墙	Fuquan	5-399	Upload file
Old Architecture of Langde Shangzhai	Langde Shangzhai gu jianzhuqun 郎德上寨古建筑群	Leishan County	5-400	Upload file
Hailongtun	Hailongtun 海龙屯	Zunyi	5-401	Upload file
Diping Wind and Rain Bridge	Diping fengyu qiao 地坪风雨桥	Liping County	5-402	Upload file
Anshun Confucius Temple	Anshun wenmiao 安顺文庙	Anshun	5-403	Upload file
Ninggu site	Ninggu yizhi 宁谷遗址	Anshun	6-185	Upload file
Wanshan Mercury Mine	Wanshan gongkuang yizhi 万山汞矿遗址	Wanshan District	6-186	Upload file
Jiaole Tombs	Jiaole muqun 交乐墓群	Xingren County	6-280	Upload file
Old Architecture of Zhijin	Zhijin gu jianzhuqun 织金古建筑群	Zhijin County	6-728	Upload file
Old Architecture of Matouzhai	Matouzhai gu jianzhuqun 马头寨古建筑群	Kaiyang County	6-729	Upload file
Old Architecture of Dongshan	Dongshan gujian zhuqun 东山古建筑群	Tongren	6-730	Upload file
Yangming Cave and Yangming Temple	Yangming dong he Yangming ci 阳明洞和阳明祠	Xiuwen County	6-731	Upload file
Old Architecture of Zhaiying Village	Zhaiyingcun gu jianzhuqun 寨英村古建筑群	Songtao County	6-732	Upload file
Old Architecture of Sitang	Sitang gu jianzhuqun 思唐古建筑群	Sinan County	6-733	Upload file
Old Architecture of Feiyunya	Feiyunya gu jianzhuqun 飞云崖古建筑群	Huangping County	6-734	Upload file
Old Architecture of Jiuzhou	Jiuzhou gu jianzhuqun 旧州古建筑群	Huangping County	6-735	Upload file
Wenchang Ge and Jiaxiu Lou	Wenchang ge he Jiaxiu lou 文昌阁和甲秀楼	Guiyang	6-736	Upload file
Gejing Bridge	Gejing qiao 葛镜桥	Fuquan	6-737	Upload file
Revolution Committee of East Guizhou	Qiandong tequ geming weiyuanhui jiuzhi 黔东特区革命委员会旧址	Yanhe County	6-1046	Upload file
Site of the Liping Conference	Liping huiyi huizhi 黎平会议会址	Liping County	6-1047	Upload file
Site of the Four Crossings of the Chishui River by the Red Army	Hongjun Sidu Chi Shui zhanyi jiuzhi 红军四渡赤水战役旧址	Xishui County	6-1048	Upload file
Revolution Committee of Sichuan, Yunnan and Guizhou Provinces	Chuan Dian Qian sheng geming weiyuanhui jiuzhi 川滇黔省革命委员会旧址	Bijie	6-1049	Upload file
24-zig of the Ledo Road	"Ershisi dao guai" kangzhan gonglu "二十四道拐"抗战公路	27°41′18″N 95°55′57″E Qinglong County	6-1050	Upload file
Former Site of the Zhejiang University in Meitan	Meitan Zhejiang daxue jiuzhi 湄潭浙江大学旧址	Meitan County	6-1051	Upload file
Former Site of Heping Village	Hepingcun jiuzhi 和平村旧址	Zhenyuan County	6-1052	Upload file

== See also ==
- Principles for the Conservation of Heritage Sites in China
