= Dujuan =

Dujuan may refer to:

- List of storms named Dujuan
- Dujuan Subdistrict, Qianxi, Guizhou, China
- DuJuan Harris (born 1988), American football running back
- Dujuan Richards (born 2005), Jamaican association footballer

== See also ==
- Du Juan (born 1982), Chinese supermodel and actress
- Du Juan (athlete) (born 1968), Chinese hurdler
