= Huaxi Yi and Miao Ethnic Township =

Huaxi Yi and Miao Ethnic Township 花溪彝族苗族乡
- Ethnic township
- Location in China
- Coordinates: 27°13′17″N 106°18′49″E
- Country: People's Republic of China
- Province: Guizhou
- Prefecture-level city: Bijie
- County-level city: Qianxi
- Time zone: China Standard

Huaxi Yi and Miao Ethnic Township (simplified Chinese: 花溪彝族苗族乡; traditional Chinese: 花溪彝族苗族鄉; pinyin: Huāxī Yí Zú Miáo Zú Xiāng) is an ethnic township for Yi people and Miao people. It is under the administration of Qianxi County in southern Guizhou province, China.

As of 2018, it had one residential community and nine villages under its administration.

== See also ==
- List of township-level divisions of Guizhou
