= Qinglongdong Ancient Architectural Complex =

Coordinates: 27°03′13″N 108°25′42″E

- Traditional Chinese: 青龍洞古建築群
- Simplified Chinese: 青龙洞古建筑群
- Literal meaning: Cyan Dragon Cave Ancient Architectural Complex
Transcriptions
Standard Mandarin
- Hanyu Pinyin: Qīnglóngdòng Gǔ Jiànzhù Qún

Qinglongdong
- Traditional Chinese: 青龍洞
- Simplified Chinese: 青龙洞
- Literal meaning: Cyan Dragon Cave
Transcriptions
Standard Mandarin
- Hanyu Pinyin: Qīnglóngdòng

Qinglongdong Ancient Architectural Complex (Chinese: 青龙洞古建筑群; pinyin: Qīnglóngdòng Gǔ Jiànzhù Qún) is located on the cliff of Mount Zhonghe (中和山; Zhōnghé Shān), and on the riverside of Wu River. Three religions, Buddhism, Taoism and Confucianism, co-exist in the Qinglongdong Ancient Architectural Complex, including Zhusheng Bridge, Zhongyuan Chan Temple, Ziyang Academy of Classical Learning (紫阳书院; Zǐyáng Shūyuàn), Qinglongdong, Wanshou Palace (万寿宫; Wànshòu Gōng; 'Longevity Palace'), and Xiangluyan (香炉岩; Xiānglú Yán; 'Incenses Burner Rock').

== History ==
Qinglongdong Ancient Architectural Complex was first established in 1388, in the 21st year of Hongwu period (1368–1398) of the Ming dynasty (1368–1644). The complex covers an area of more than 3000 square meters. There are 36 single buildings, most of which are built close to the cliff of Mount Zhonghe.

On 16 September 1981, it was designated as a cultural relics protection unit at county level. On 23 February 1982, it was inscribed as a cultural relics protection unit. In 1988, it was listed among the third batch of "Major National Historical and Cultural Sites in Guizhou" by the State Council of China.

== Gallery ==
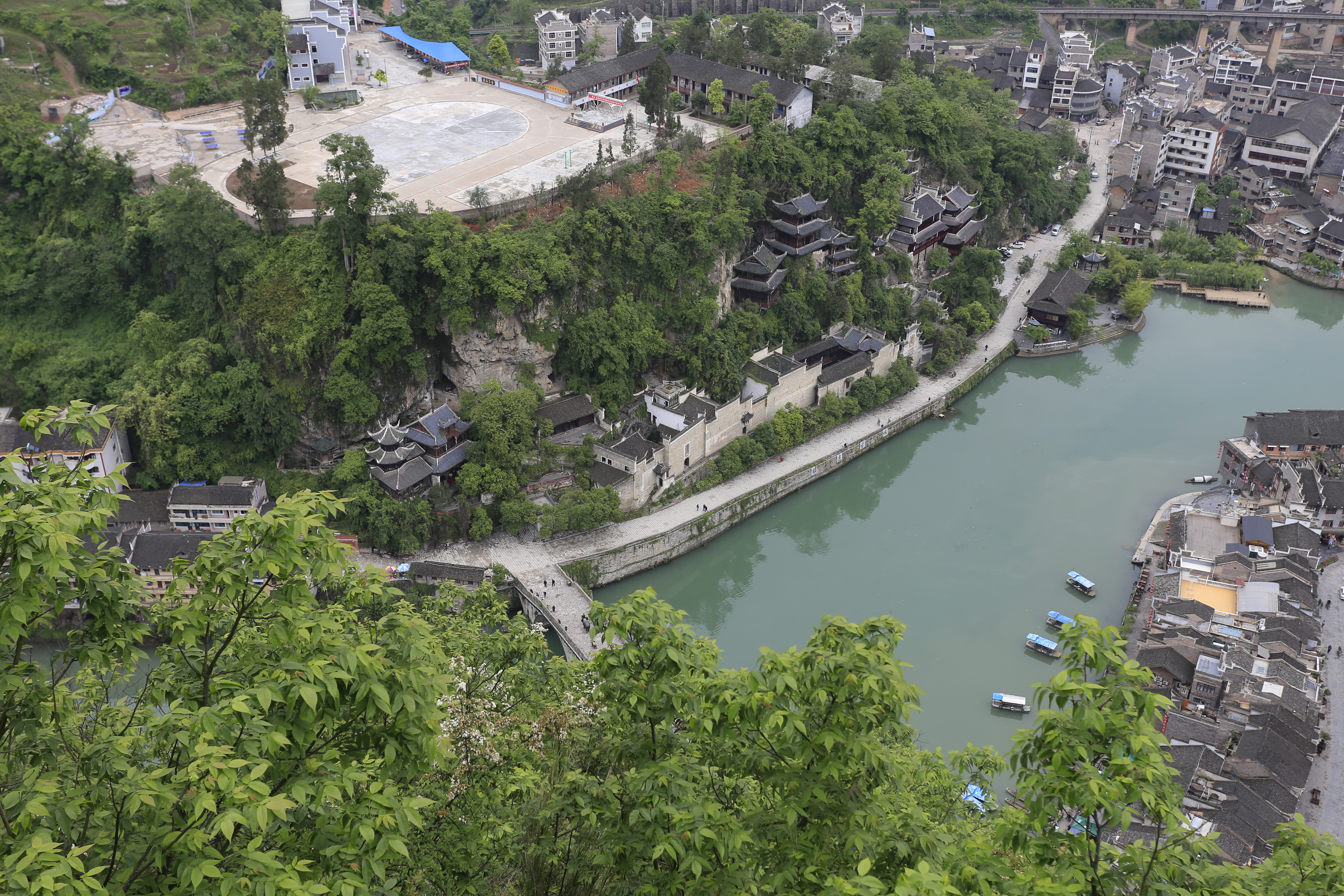
Qinglongdong Ancient Architectural Complex in April 2014.
