= Zhenyuan railway station =

Railway station in Guizhou, China

Zhenyuan railway station 鎮遠站
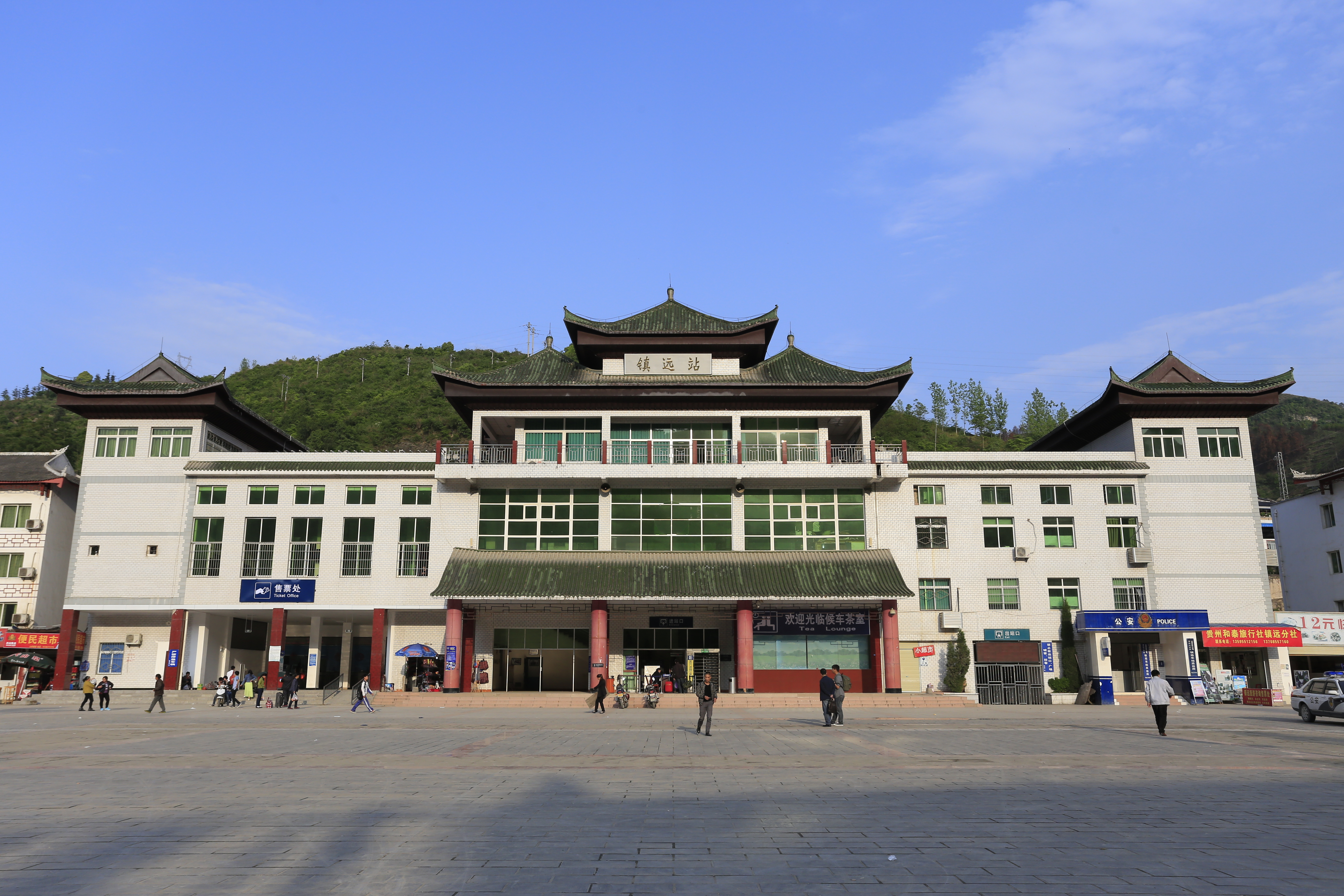
- Zhenyuan Railway Station.

General information
- Location: Zhenyuan County, Guizhou; China
- Coordinates: 27°02′13″N 108°24′24″E
- Operated by: China Railway
- Line(s): Shanghai–Kunming railway

History
- Opened: 1974
Location

Zhenyuan railway station (simplified Chinese: 镇远站; traditional Chinese: 鎮遠站; pinyin: Zhènyuǎn Zhàn) is a railway station located in Zhenyuan County, Guizhou, China, on the Shanghai–Kunming railway line, which are operated by China Railway Chengdu Group.

== History ==
The railway station opened in 1974.

== Gallery ==
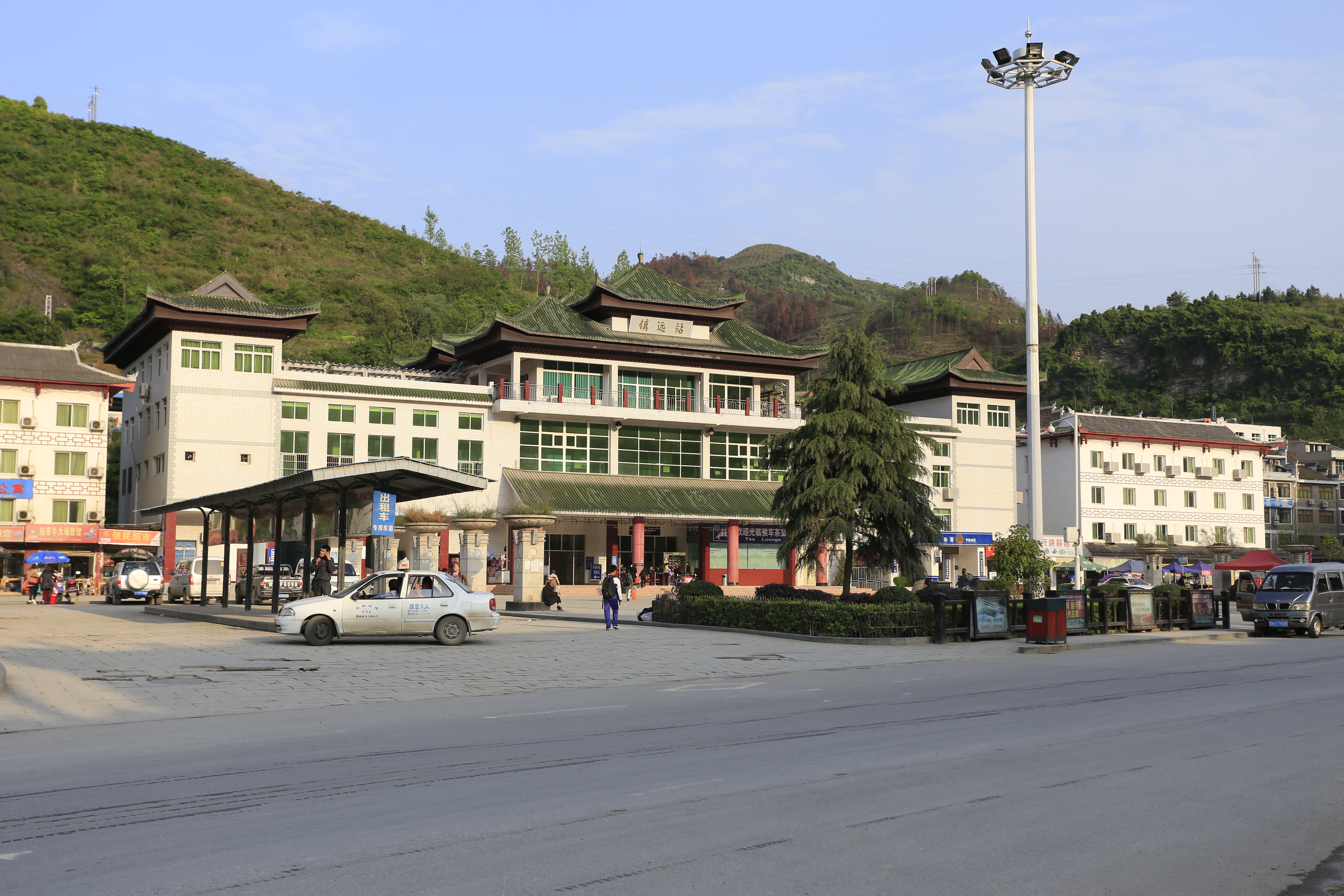
Zhenyuan railway station.

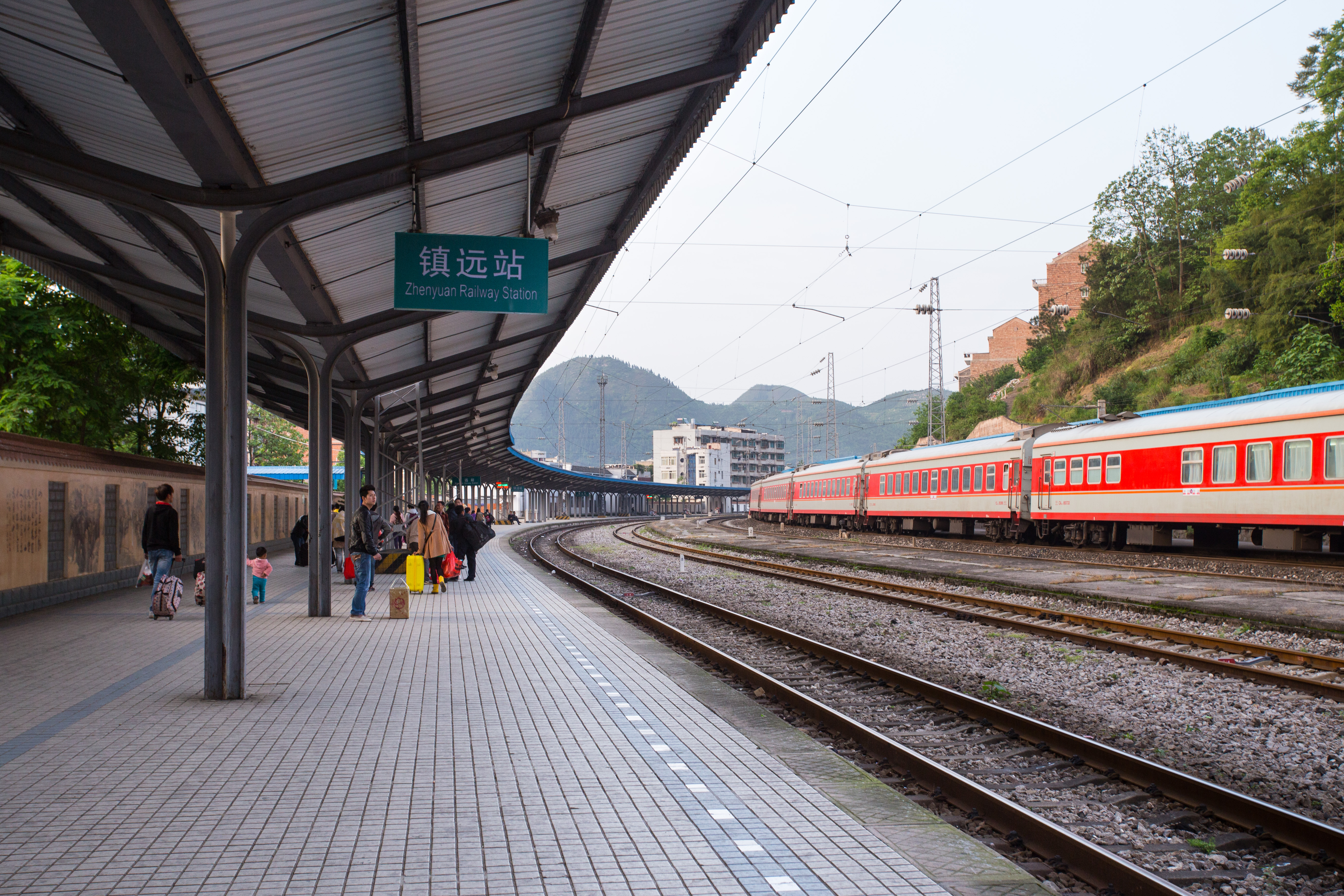
Station platform.

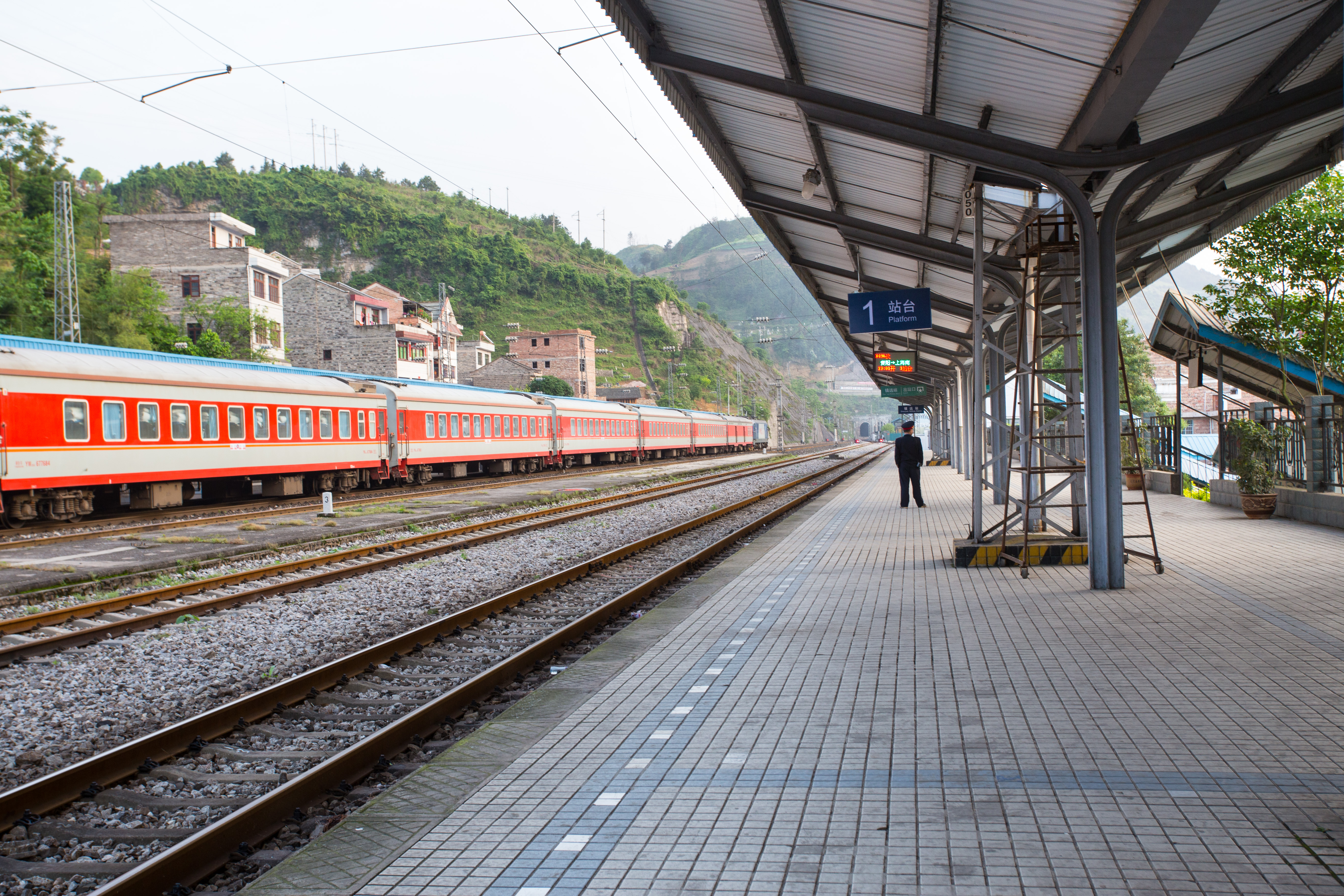
Station platform.
