= 24-zig =

Road in Guizhou, China

Coordinates: 25.822121°N 105.202375°E

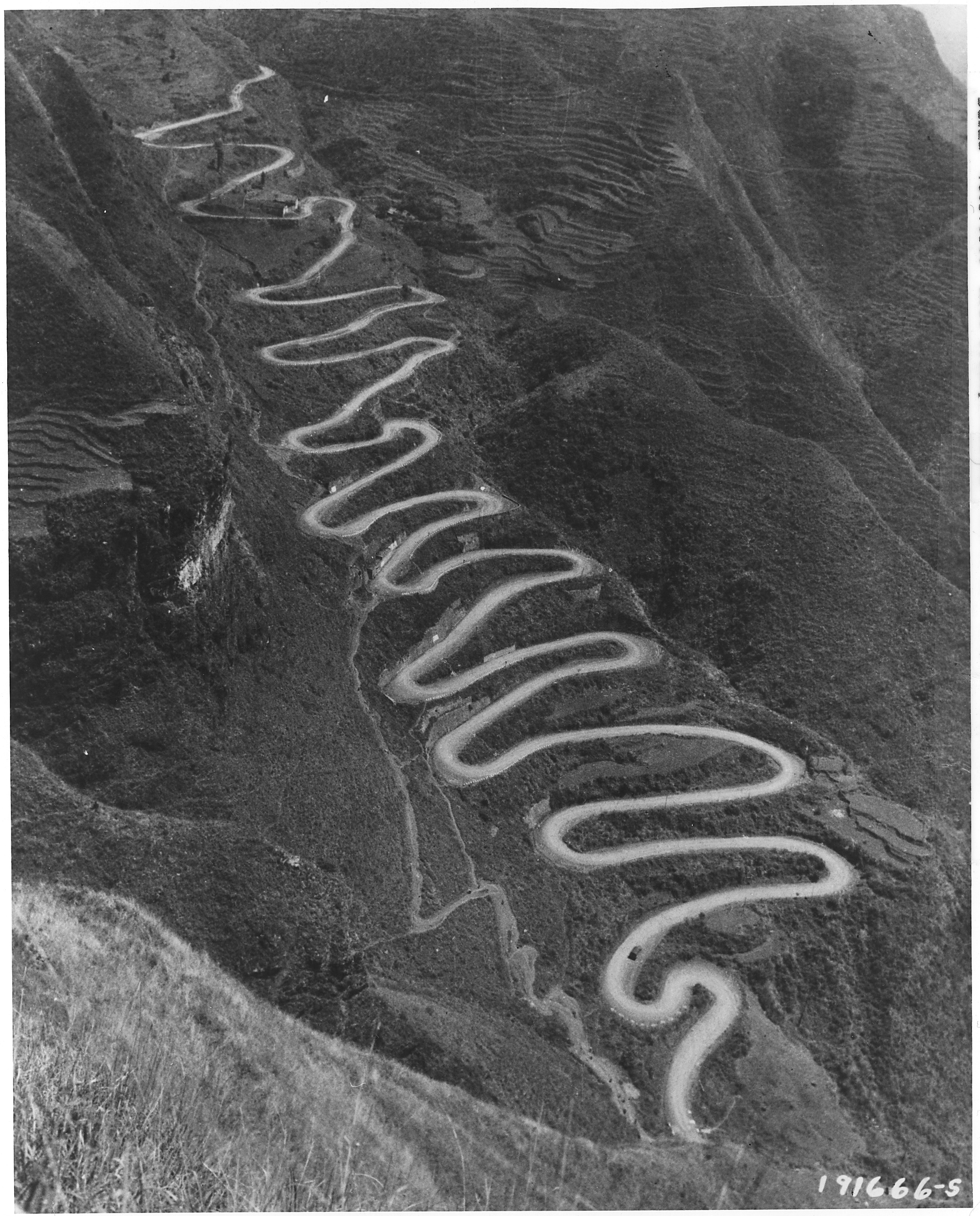
View of the road

The 24-zig is a winding mountain road in the southwest of China, which became known worldwide in the Second Sino-Japanese War as a symbol of the efforts made by the United States Army to support China.

== Location ==
The 24-zig from the Second Sino-Chinese War lies in Qinglong County (Chinese: 晴隆 县; pinyin: Qínglóng Xiàn) in the north of the Qianxinan Buyei and Miao Autonomous Prefecture, which is located in the southwest of the Chinese province of Guizhou in the border triangle of Guizhou, Yunnan and Guangxi. After the war, it was long believed that the street was in Yunnan Province.

It is an extension of Ledo Road, which is also called the "Stilwell Road", named after the American general Joseph Stilwell. The street has been on the list of Monuments of the People's Republic of China (6-1050) since 2006.
