= Guanyindong =

Cave and archaeological site in China

Guanyindong (Chinese: 观音洞; pinyin: Guānyīndòng) or Guanyin Cave is a Palaeolithic cave site, discovered in 1964 by archaeologist Pei Wenzhong in Qianxi County, Guizhou, China.

During several archaeological excavations in the 1960s and 1970s, most of the material remains were gathered from the cave entrance. About one-third of the artifacts were extracted from the upper layer which is called "Layer 2" or "Group A" by archaeologist Prof. Li Yanxian, and the rest of them were conducted from the lower layers- "Layers 4–8" or "Group B". According to Associate Professor Bo Li, besides a number of non-Levallois flakes, archaeologists examined more than 2000 stone artifacts from Guanyindong and revealed proof of Levallois concepts on 45 samples (including cores, flakes and tools).

It contains the earliest evidence of stone artefacts made using the Levallois technique in China. In November 2018, the discovery of these stones dated to approximately 170,000-80,000 years ago were announced by the University of Wollongong.

The site has been on the List of Major National Historical and Cultural Sites in Guizhou Qianxi Guanyin dong yizhi (黔西观音洞遗址) since 2001.
