= Zhenyuan County, Guizhou =

Zhenyuan County 镇远县 Chenyuan; Chenyüan
- County
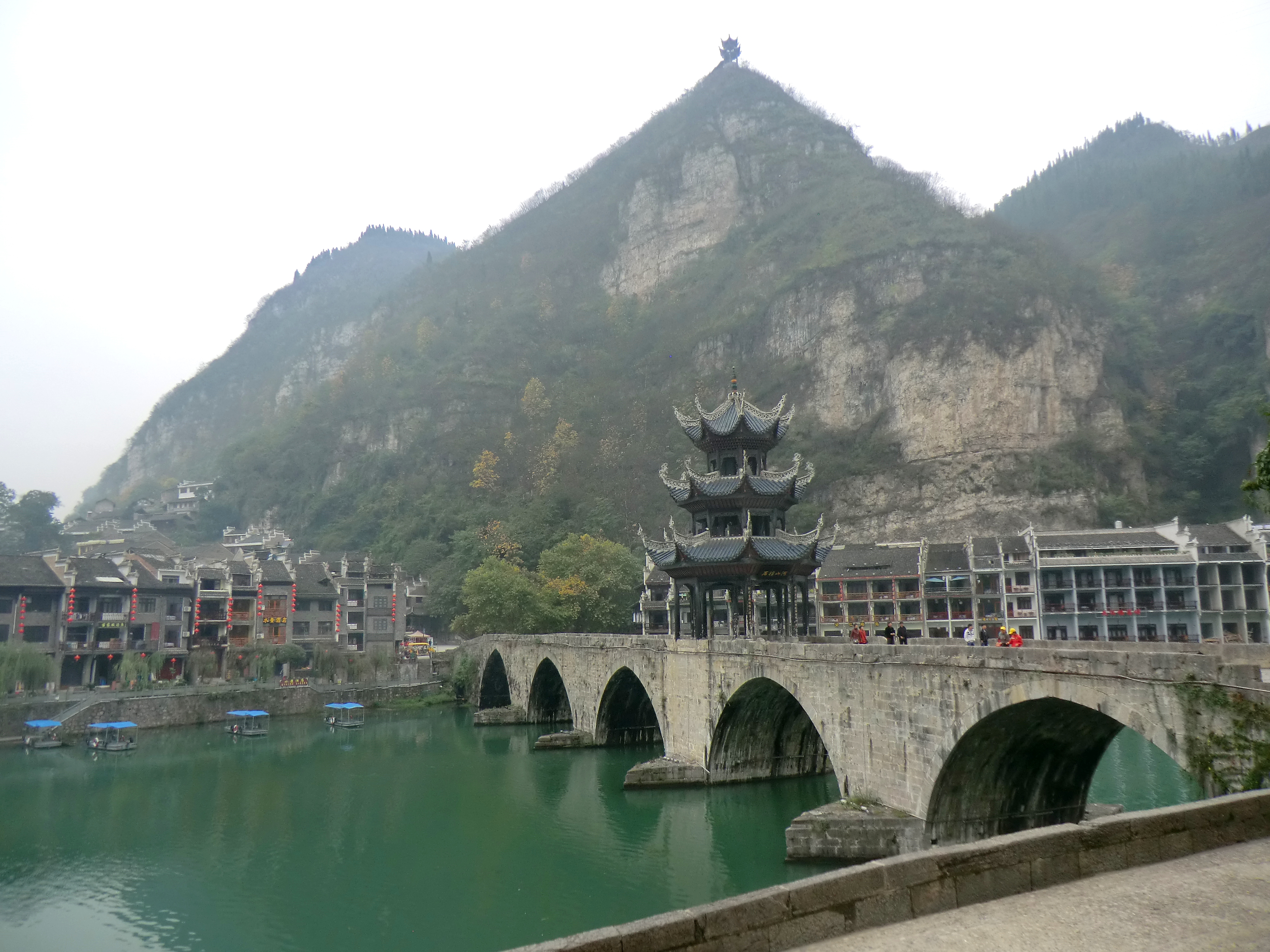
- Zhusheng Bridge (祝圣桥) spanning the Wuyang River.

- Location of the seat in Guizhou Zhenyuan (Southwest China)
- Coordinates (Zhenyuan County government): 27°02′57″N 108°25′47″E
- Country: China
- Province: Guizhou
- Autonomous prefecture: Qiandongnan
- County seat: Wuyang

Area
  - Total: 1,878 km^{2} (725 sq mi)

Population (2010)
  - Total: 203,735
  - Density: 108.5/km^{2} (281.0/sq mi)
- Time zone: UTC+8 (China Standard)

Zhenyuan County, Guizhou
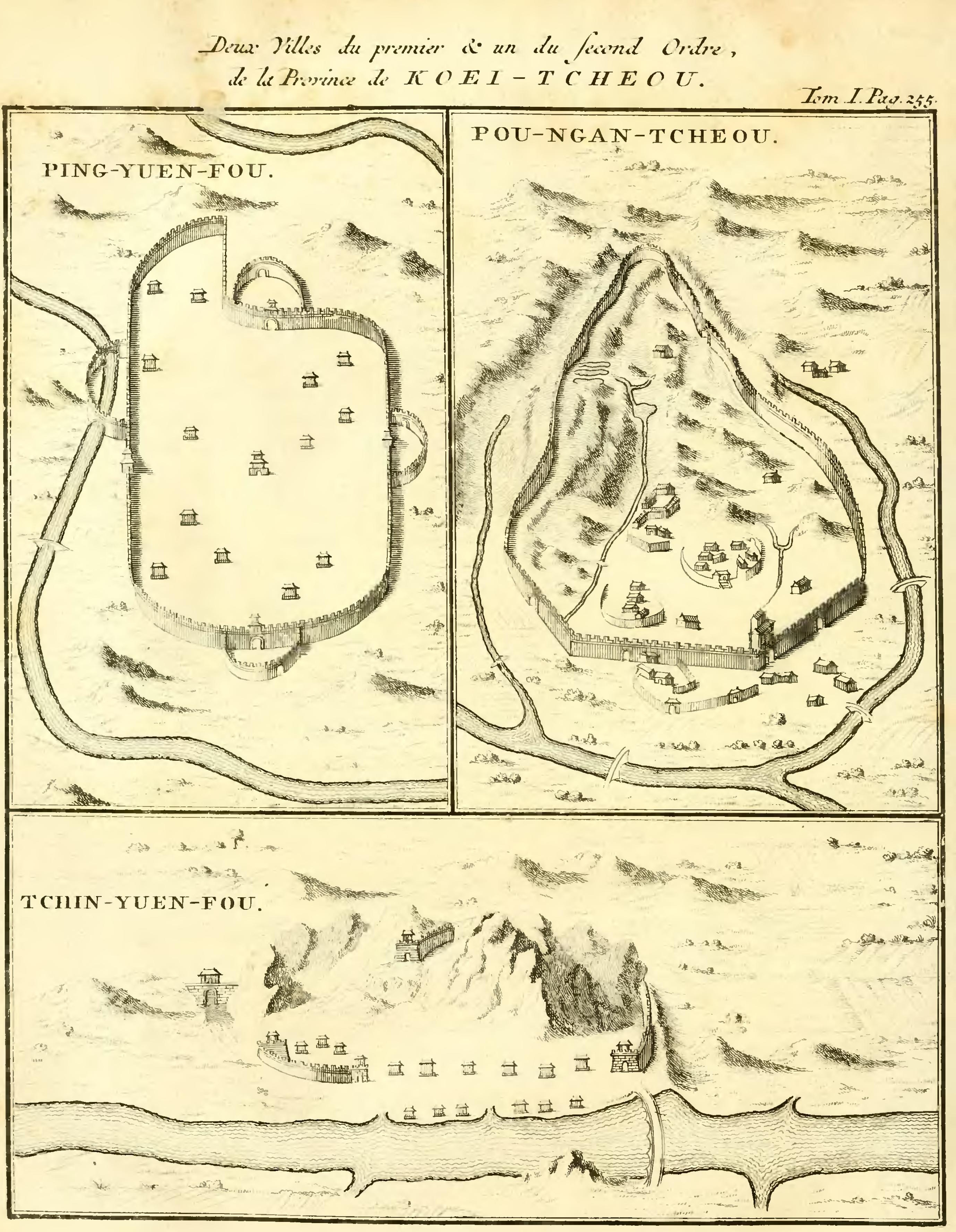
- "Tchin-yuen-fou" & 2 other towns of "Koei-tcheou" from Du Halde's 1736 Description of China
- Traditional Chinese: 鎮遠縣
- Simplified Chinese: 镇远县
Transcriptions
Standard Mandarin
- Hanyu Pinyin: Zhènyuǎnxiàn
- Wade–Giles: Chên-yüan Hsien

Zhenyuan County (Chinese: 镇远县) is a county of the Qiandongnan Miao and Dong Autonomous Prefecture in the east of Guizhou province, China.

== History ==
Originally inhabited by the Dong and Miao ethnic groups, the area became known during the Southern Song dynasty when the Zhenyuan Border Defense Commissioner's Office was established along the Dong River. During the Yuan dynasty, it was reorganized as the Zhenyuan Military and Civilian Prefecture, with the annexed Anyi County. In the early Ming dynasty, Zhenyuan was established as a prefecture and a military garrison. During the Yongle era, it was upgraded to Zhenyuan Prefecture, with all administrative units located within the same city. In the Hongzhi era, the Zhenyuan Garrison was reclassified as a county. In 1913, the prefecture was abolished, leaving only the county. In 1956, the Qiandongnan Miao and Dong Autonomous Prefecture was established, initially with Zhenyuan as its capital, before relocating to Kaili in 1958.

== Administrative divisions ==
Zhenyuan county has eight towns, three townships and one ethnic township under its jurisdiction:

towns

- Wuyang Town (㵲阳镇)
- Jiaoxi Town (蕉溪镇)
- Qingxi Town (青溪镇)
- Yangping Town (羊坪镇)
- Yangchang Town (羊场镇)
- Duping Town (都坪镇)
- Jianggu Town (江古镇)
- Jinbao Town (金堡镇)

townships

- Yongxi Township (涌溪乡)
- Baojing Township (报京乡)
- Dadi Township (大地乡)

ethnic township

- Shangzhai Tujia Ethnic Township (尚寨土家族乡)

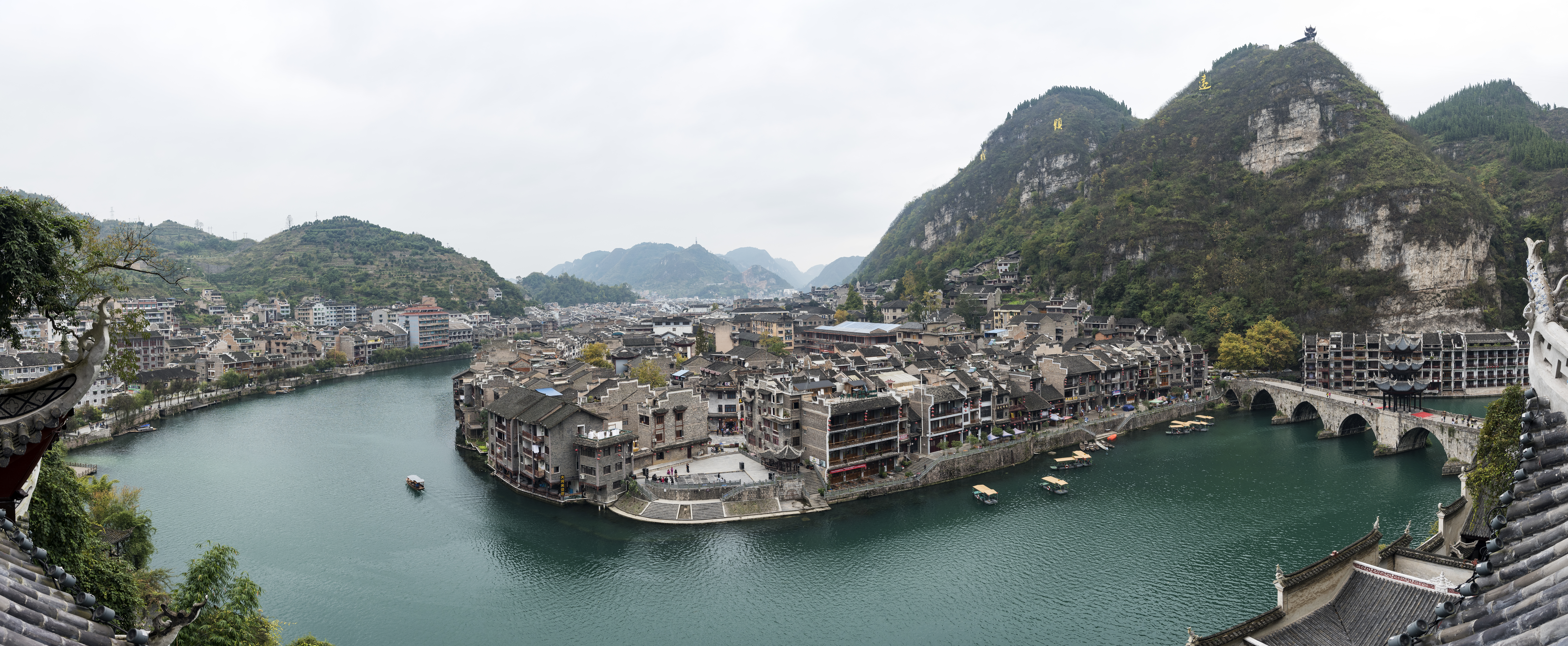
Panorama of Zhenyuan Old Town

== Geography ==
Zhenyuan County is located in southeastern Guizhou province. The county has a total area of 1,878 km^{2} (725 sq mi). It is surrounded by Cengong County and Shiqian County on the north, Shibing County on the west, Xinhuang Dong Autonomous County on the east, and Sansui County and Jianhe County on the south.

=== Climate ===
Zhenyuan County enjoys a subtropical humid monsoon climate, enjoying four distinct seasons and abundant precipitation, with an average annual temperature of 16.5 °C (61.7 °F), total annual rainfall of 1,093.6-millimetre (43.06 in), and annual average sunshine hours in 1144 hours. The highest temperature is 40.1 °C (104.2 °F), and the lowest temperature is −5.3 °C (22.5 °F).

Climate data for Zhenyuan, elevation 516 m (1,693 ft), (1991–2020 normals, extremes 1981–2010)
Month	Jan	Feb	Mar	Apr	May	Jun	Jul	Aug	Sep	Oct	Nov	Dec	Year
Record high °C (°F)	26.5 (79.7)	32.6 (90.7)	35.2 (95.4)	36.2 (97.2)	37.5 (99.5)	36.5 (97.7)	40.0 (104.0)	40.1 (104.2)	39.4 (102.9)	35.7 (96.3)	31.6 (88.9)	25.4 (77.7)	40.1 (104.2)
Mean daily maximum °C (°F)	8.7 (47.7)	11.8 (53.2)	16.3 (61.3)	22.4 (72.3)	26.1 (79.0)	28.8 (83.8)	31.9 (89.4)	31.9 (89.4)	28.0 (82.4)	21.9 (71.4)	17.2 (63.0)	11.4 (52.5)	21.4 (70.5)
Daily mean °C (°F)	5.3 (41.5)	7.6 (45.7)	11.6 (52.9)	16.9 (62.4)	20.8 (69.4)	23.9 (75.0)	26.2 (79.2)	25.8 (78.4)	22.4 (72.3)	17.3 (63.1)	12.5 (54.5)	7.4 (45.3)	16.5 (61.6)
Mean daily minimum °C (°F)	3.1 (37.6)	4.9 (40.8)	8.4 (47.1)	13.2 (55.8)	17.1 (62.8)	20.7 (69.3)	22.3 (72.1)	21.9 (71.4)	18.8 (65.8)	14.3 (57.7)	9.5 (49.1)	4.8 (40.6)	13.3 (55.8)
Record low °C (°F)	−5.3 (22.5)	−3.8 (25.2)	−2.7 (27.1)	3.5 (38.3)	7.8 (46.0)	12.2 (54.0)	14.5 (58.1)	15.6 (60.1)	11.0 (51.8)	4.1 (39.4)	−1.0 (30.2)	−4.6 (23.7)	−5.3 (22.5)
Average precipitation mm (inches)	32.2 (1.27)	32.1 (1.26)	68.4 (2.69)	114.6 (4.51)	169.5 (6.67)	186.1 (7.33)	151.1 (5.95)	103.7 (4.08)	81.1 (3.19)	79.6 (3.13)	47.8 (1.88)	27.4 (1.08)	1,093.6 (43.04)
Average precipitation days (≥ 0.1 mm)	12.4	11.7	15.1	15.9	16.4	15.8	13.8	12.6	9.8	12.7	9.6	10.2	156
Average snowy days	4.6	2.6	0.6	0	0	0	0	0	0	0	0.1	1.7	9.6
Average relative humidity (%)	77	76	78	79	81	83	80	79	79	81	79	75	79
Mean monthly sunshine hours	36.4	46.0	66.5	92.4	107.5	100.4	165.9	176.4	128.6	85.8	77.7	60.5	1,144.1
Percentage possible sunshine	11	14	18	24	26	24	39	44	35	24	24	19	25
Source: China Meteorological Administration

=== Rivers ===
There are 106 rivers and streams in Zhenyuan County. Wuyang River flows through the downtown county.

== Demographics ==
=== Population ===
As of 2013, there were 268,500 people, 81,000 households residing in Zhenyuan County, including 142,300 males and 126,200 females; the total permanent resident population was 203,200, including 77,500 urban population.

=== Language ===
Mandarin is the official language. The local people speak both Southwestern Mandarin and minority languages such as Miao languages.

=== Religion ===
The Government of Zhenyuan County supports all religions. The local people mainly believe in Chinese folk religion, Taoism, Buddhism and Catholicism.

== Economy ==
In 2019, the GDP of Zhenyuan County reached 5.859 billion yuan. Agriculture is an important part of Zhenyuan County's economy, of which rice farming and vegetable cultivation represent the largest sector. The forestry industry is also large sectors within the agricultural economy of the county. In addition, tourism (particularly related to history and wine) is a significant and growing portion of the economy.

== Education ==
In 2013, there were eighty-one schools in Zhenyuan County, including two high schools, seventeen middle schools, one secondary vocational and technical school, forty-eight primary schools and thirteen kindergartens.

== Culture and tourism ==
There are three national relic protection units in Zhenyuan County, the Qinglongdong Ancient Architectural Complex, the Site of Heping Village, and the Zhenyuan Ancient Wall. Major Buddhist Temples in Zhenyuan County include Zhongyuan Chan Temple. Major Taoist Temples include Mazu Temple and Wanshou Palace or Longevity Palace. Other tourist destinations include Mount Shiping.

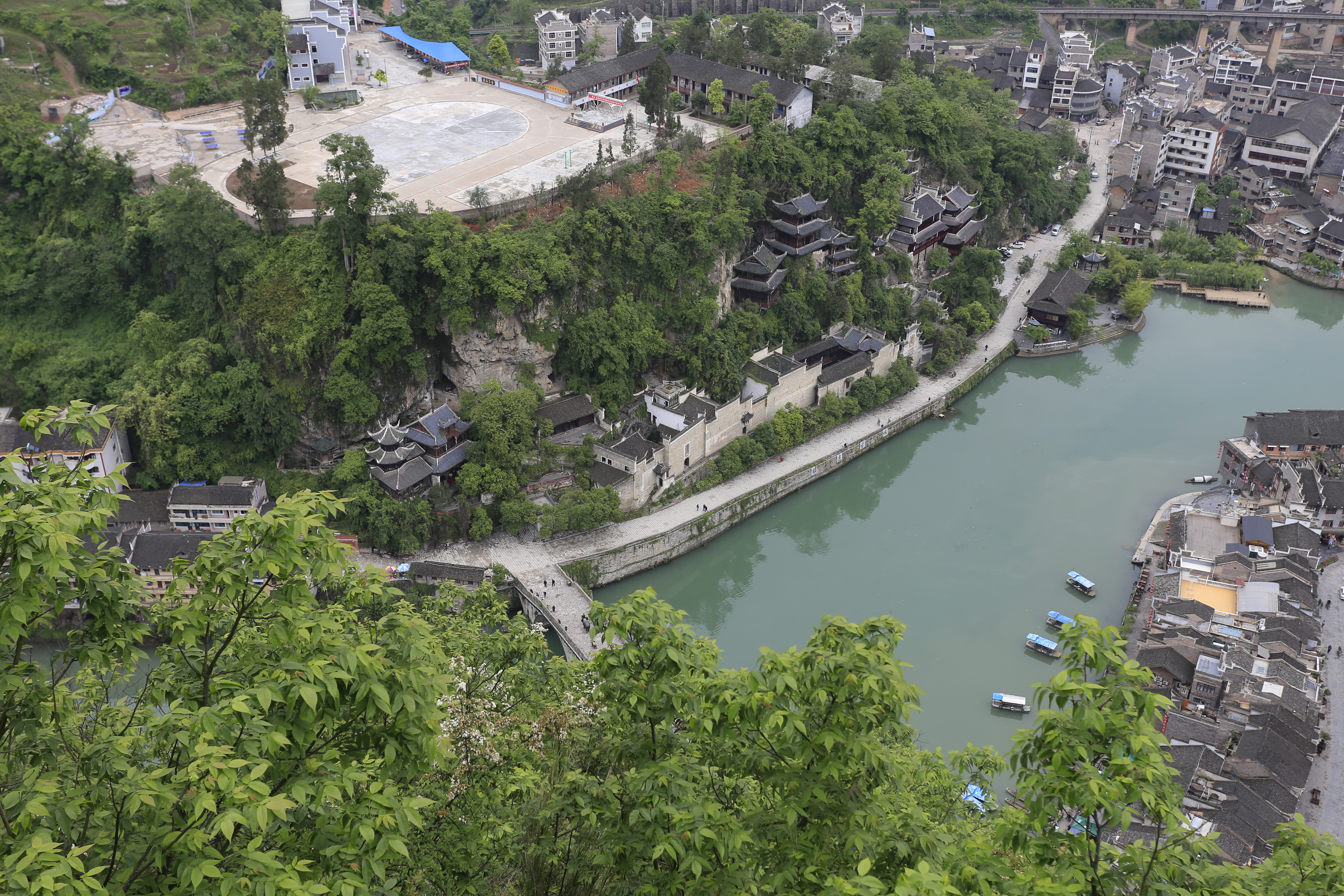
An aerial view of Qinglongdong Ancient Architectural Complex.

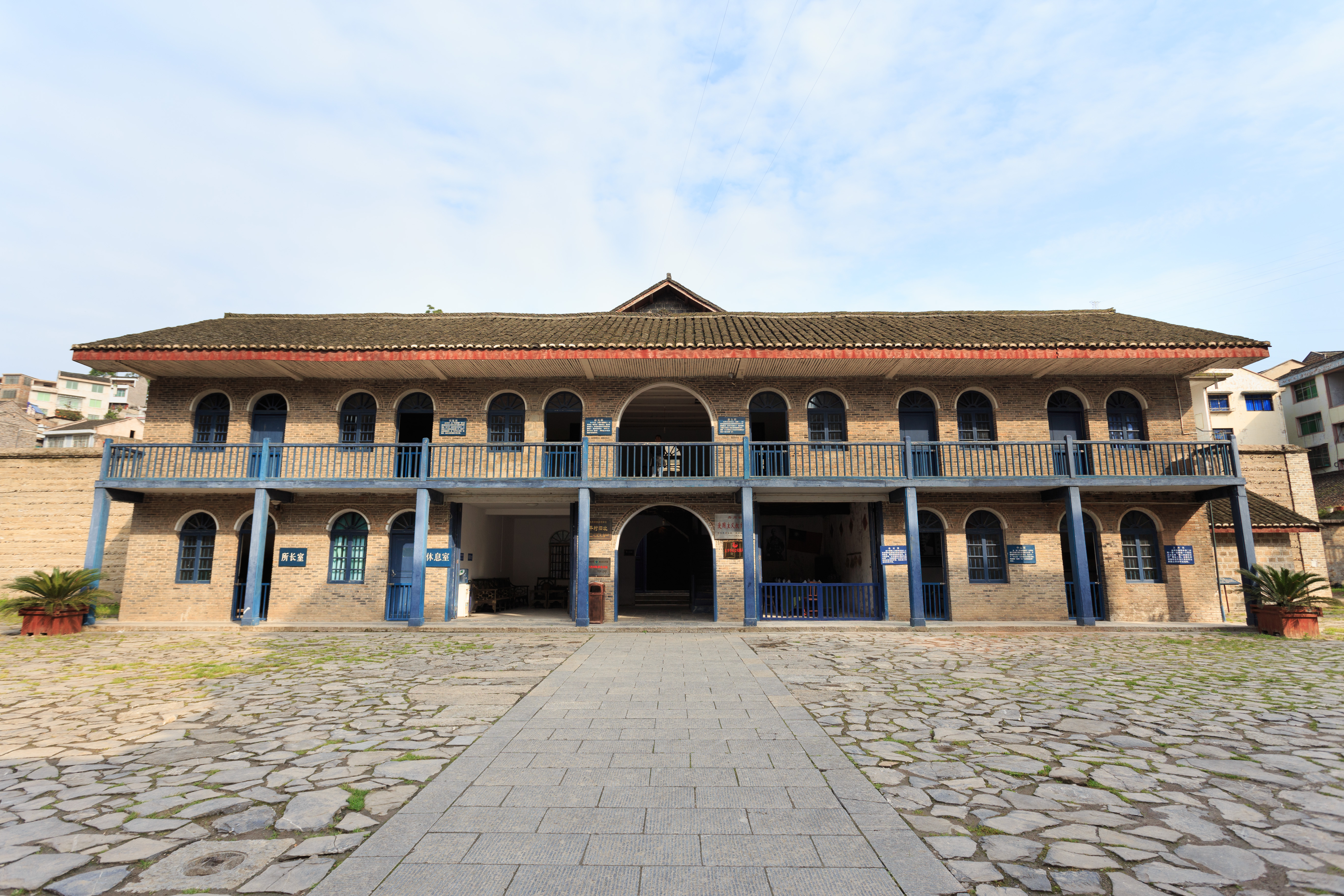
Front view of Heping Village.

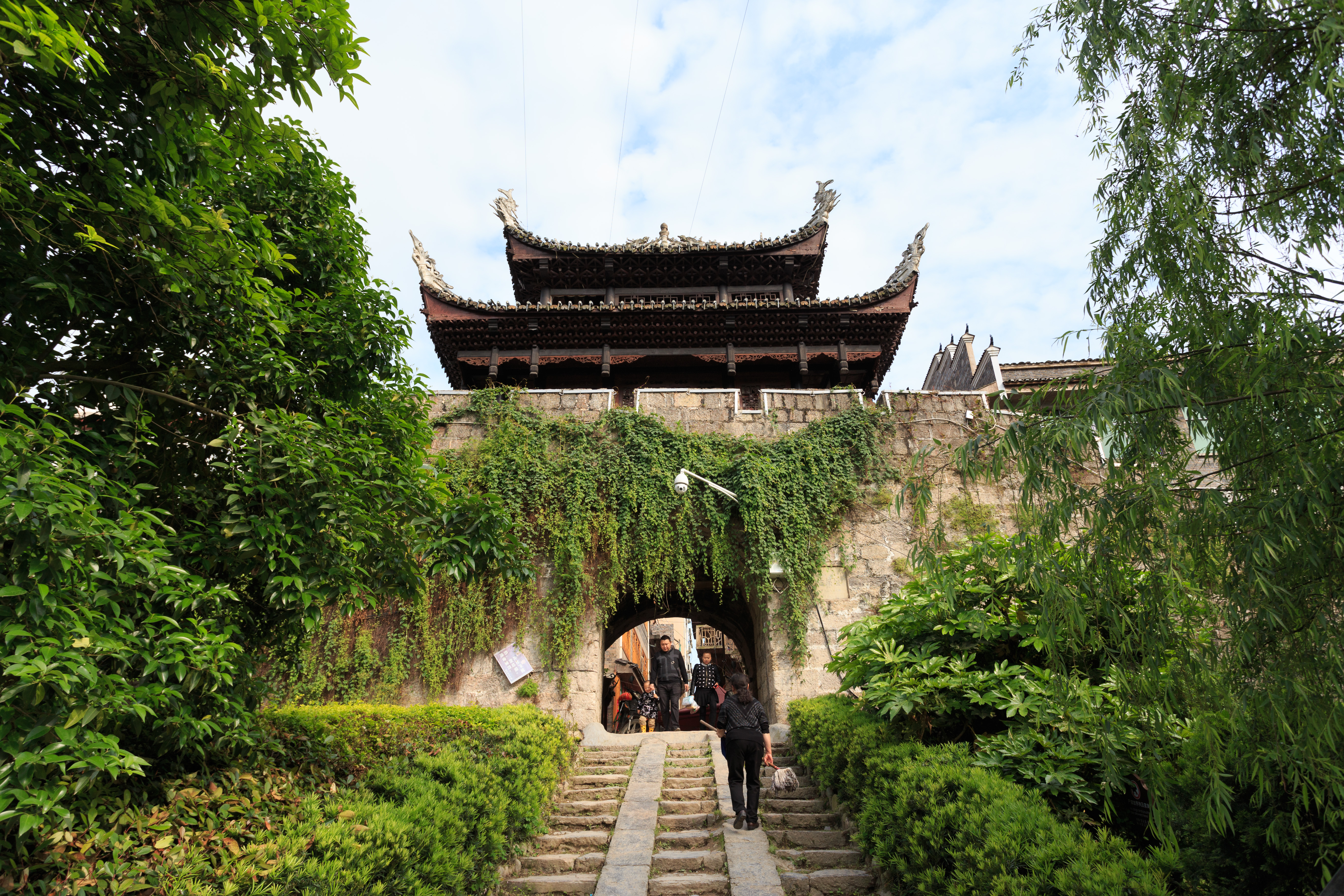
Front view of Zhenyuan Ancient Wall.

== Transportation ==
=== Rail ===
The Hunan–Guizhou railway, more commonly known as "Xiang–Qian railway", passes through the county.

The Zhuzhou–Liupanshui railway also passes through the county.

Zhenyuan railway station serves Zhenyuan County.

=== Expressway ===
The G60 Shanghai–Kunming Expressway, commonly abbreviated as "Hu–Kun Expressway", passes across the county.

=== National Highway ===
The National Highway G320, more commonly known as "G320", passes across the eastern county.

The National Highway G211, more commonly known as "G211", is a north–south highway passing through the western Zhenyuan County.

=== Provincial Highway ===
The Provincial Highway S306, is an east–west highway traveling through central Zhenyuan County and its downtown, commercial and industrial subdistricts.

The Provincial Highway S25, which heads north to Shiqian County and south to Jianhe County, passing through the western Zhenyuan County.

The Provincial Highway S84, from Shibing County to Zhenyuan County, is connected to the Provincial Highway S25 at Baiyangping Hub (柏杨坪枢纽).

== Notable Figures ==
Throughout history, Zhenyuan has been visited or guarded by numerous literati, military generals, including renowned figures such as Zhang Sanfeng, Wang Shouren, Wu Sangui, Wu Jingzi, Lin Zexu, Li Liejun, Feng Yuxiang, and others. Many of them have mentioned Zhenyuan in their poetry and prose.
