= Dujuan Subdistrict =

Dujuan Subdistrict 杜鹃街道
- Subdistrict
- Location in Guizhou
- Coordinates: 27°1′48″N 106°1′26″E
- Country: People's Republic of China
- Province: Guizhou
- Prefecture-level city: Bijie
- County-level city: Qianxi
- Time zone: UTC+8 (China Standard)

Dujuan Subdistrict (simplified Chinese: 杜鹃街道; traditional Chinese: 杜鵑街道; pinyin: Dùjuān Jiēdào) is a subdistrict in Qianxi, Guizhou, China. As of 2023, it administers seven residential communities: Yucai Community (育才社区), Xiangyang Community (向阳社区), Paizhuang Community (牌庄社区), Daxing Community (大兴社区), Chabai Community (岔白社区), Jinzhong Community (金钟社区), and Wuluoba Community (乌骡坝社区).

== See also ==
- List of township-level divisions of Guizhou
