= Anshun Confucius Temple =

Confucian temple in Guizhou Province, China

- 安顺文庙
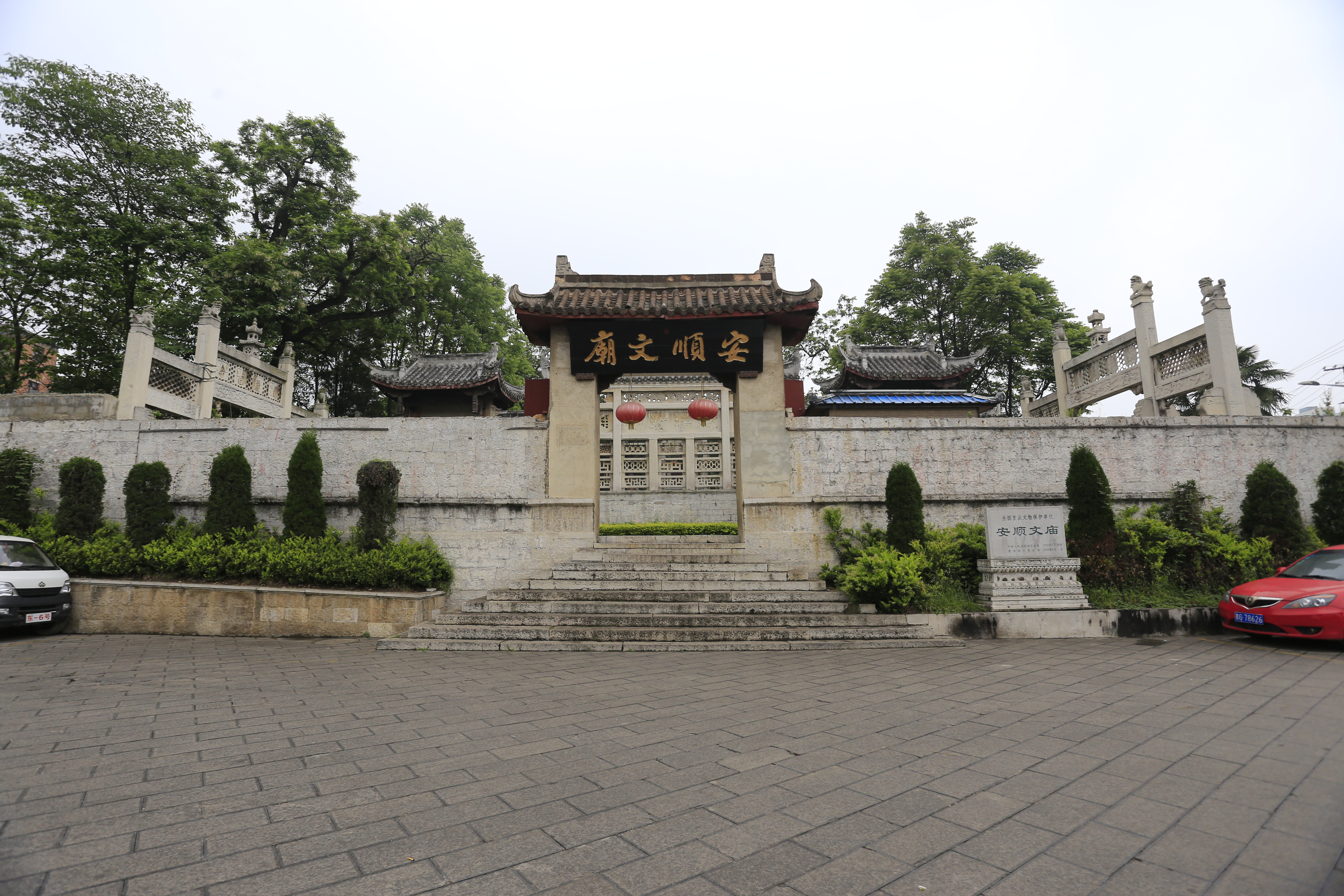

Religion
- Affiliation: Confucianism

Location
- Location: Anshun City, Guizhou Province
- Interactive map of Anshun Confucius Temple
- Coordinates: 26°15′10″N 105°55′56″E

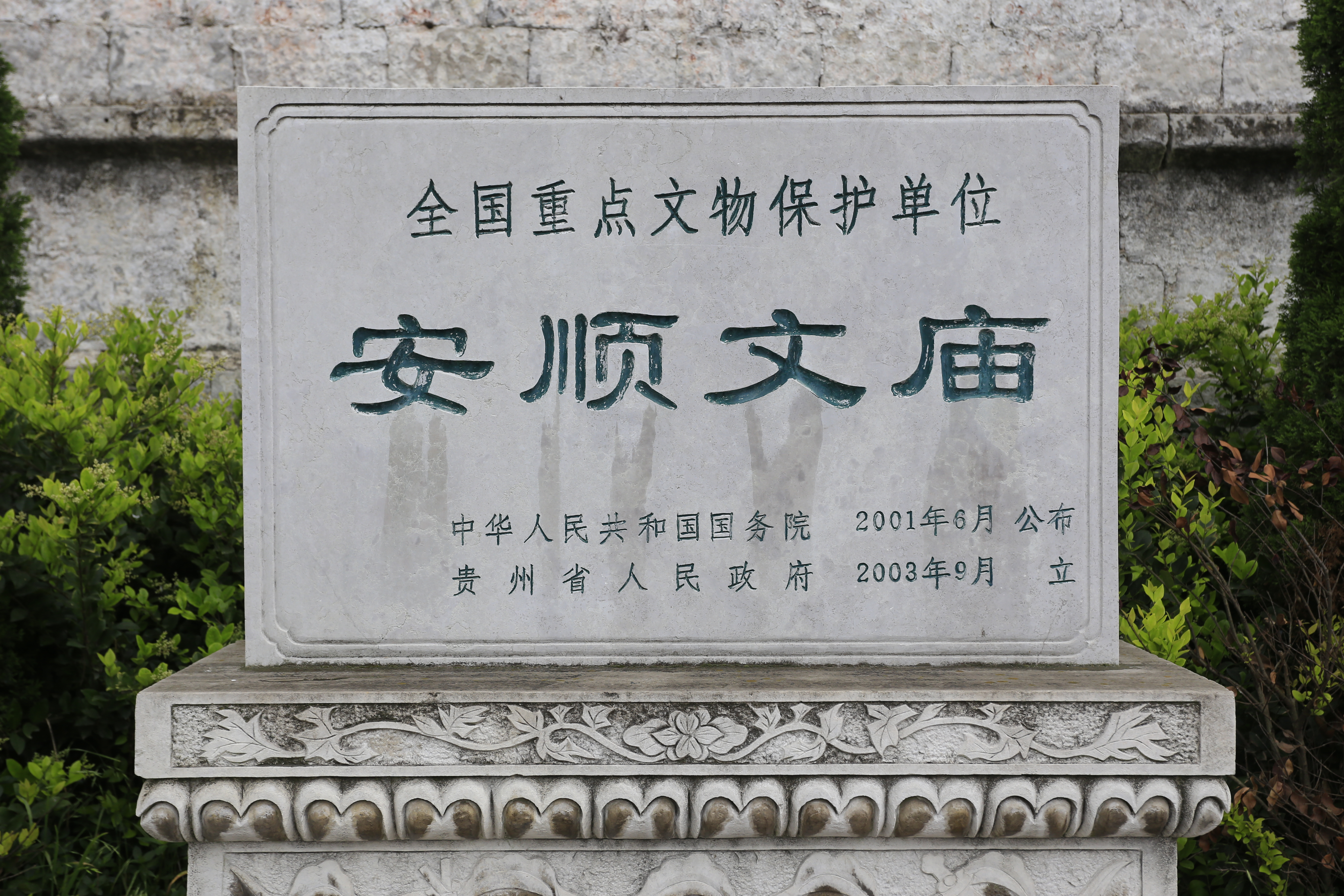

Anshun Confucius Temple (simplified Chinese: 安顺文庙; traditional Chinese: 安順文廟), or Anshun Confucian Temple, also known as Fuxue Palace (府学宫), is a Confucian temple located in Xixiu District, Anshun City, Guizhou Province. It is one of the four major ancient stone architectural complexes in China.

The total area of Anshun Confucius Temple is 11,500 square meters, and it was listed as the fifth batch of China's Major Historical and Cultural Site Protected at the National Level in 2001.

== History ==
The construction of the Anshun Confucius Temple began in the 27th year of Hongwu in the Ming Dynasty (1394). It was rebuilt and expanded several times in the Ming Dynasty and Qing Dynasty.
