= Qianxi, Guizhou =

Qianxi 黔西市
- County-level city
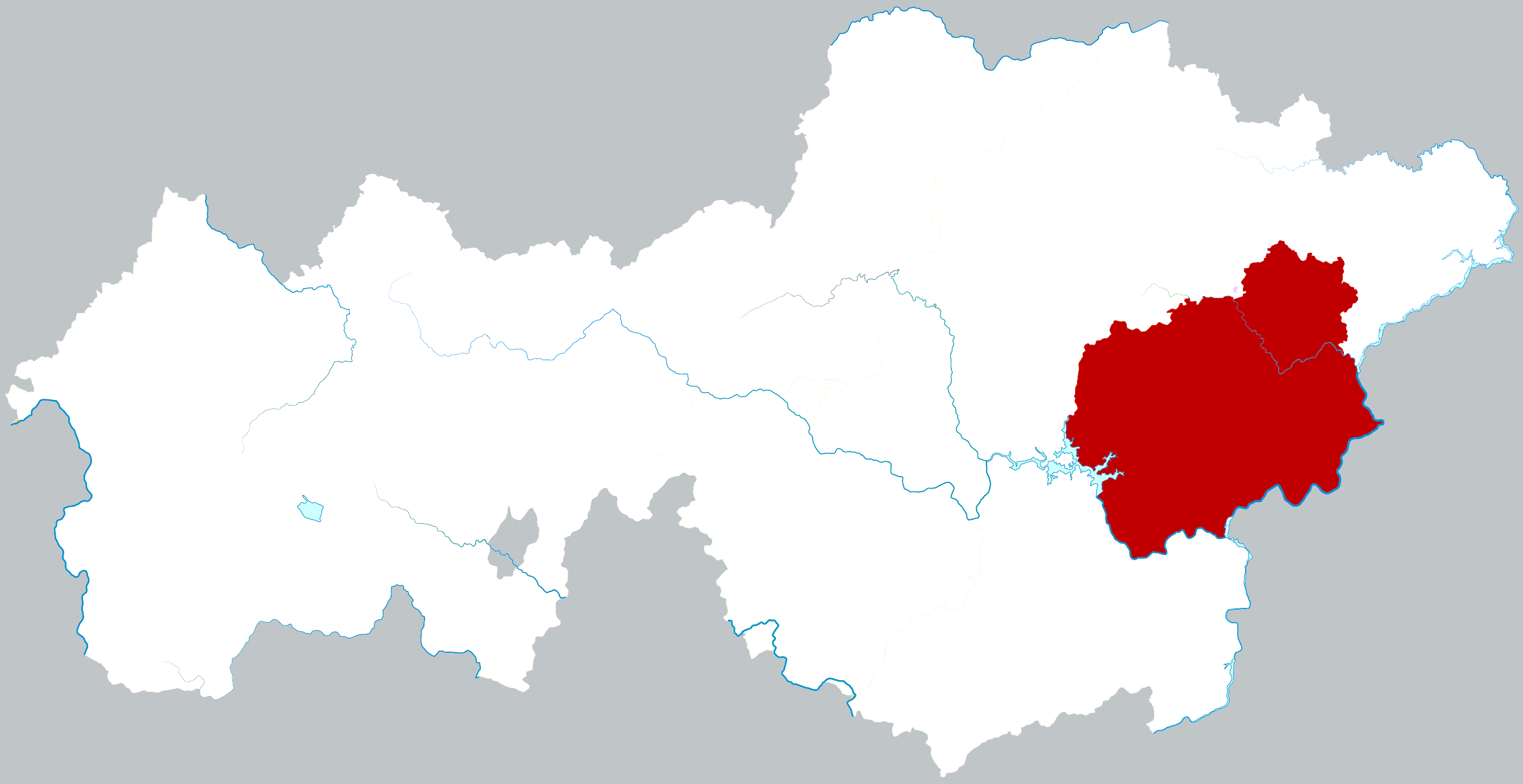
- Qianxi in Bijie

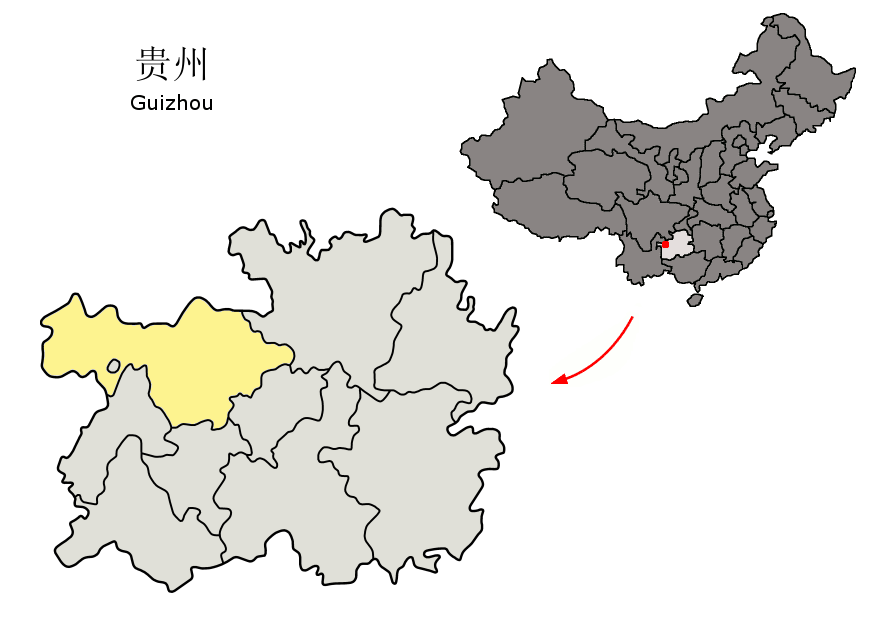
- Bijie in Guizhou
- Coordinates (Qianxi County government): 27°00′31″N 106°01′56″E
- Country: China
- Province: Guizhou
- Prefecture-level city: Bijie
- Municipal seat: Liancheng Subdistrict

Area
  - County-level city: 2,380.5 km^{2} (919.1 sq mi)
  - Urban: 18.6 km^{2} (7.2 sq mi)
- Elevation: 1,225 m (4,019 ft)

Population (2019)
  - County-level city: 970,700
  - Density: 407.8/km^{2} (1,056/sq mi)
  - Urban: 391,300
  - Rural: 579,400
- Time zone: UTC+8 (China Standard)
- Postal code: 551500
- Area code: 0857
- Website: www.gzqianxi.gov.cn

Qianxi (Chinese: 黔西市; pinyin: Qiánxī Shì) is a county-level city of western Guizhou province, China. It is under the administration of Bijie City. The county had a population of 970,700 in 2019.

== History ==
The area of Qianxi has been inhabited since prehistoric times, as evidenced by stone tools found in the Guanyin cave among others.

== Arts and Culture ==
Qianxi is also the home of Guizhou opera (Qianju).

== Administrative divisions ==
Qianxi is divided into 5 subdistricts, 15 towns and 12 ethnic townships:

=== Subdistricts ===
- Liancheng 莲城街道
- Shuixi 水西街道
- Wenfeng 文峰街道
- Dujuan 杜鹃街道
- Jinxiu 锦绣街道

=== Towns ===
- Jinbi 金碧镇
- Yuduo 雨朵镇
- Daguan 大关镇
- Guli 谷里镇
- Supu 素朴镇
- Zhongping 中坪镇
- Chongxin 重新镇
- Linquan 林泉镇
- Jinlan 金兰镇
- Jinxing 锦星镇
- Gantang 甘棠镇
- Hongshui 洪水镇
- Zhongshan 钟山镇
- Xiehe 协和镇
- Guanyindong 观音洞镇

=== Ethnic Townships ===
- Wuli Bouyei and Miao Ethnic Township 五里布依族苗族乡
- Lühua Bai and Yi Ethnic Township 绿化白族彝族乡
- Xinren Miao Ethnic Township 新仁苗族乡
- Tieshi Miao and Yi Ethnic Township 铁石苗族彝族乡
- Tailai Yi and Miao Ethnic Township 太来彝族苗族乡
- Yongshen Yi and Miao Ethnic Township 永燊彝族苗族乡
- Zhongjian Miao and Yi Ethnic Township 中建苗族彝族乡
- Huaxi Yi and Miao Ethnic Township 花溪彝族苗族乡
- Dingxin Yi and Miao Ethnic Township 定新彝族苗族乡
- Jinpo Miao, Yi and Manchu Ethnic Township 金坡苗族彝族满族乡
- Renhe Yi and Miao Ethnic Township 仁和彝族苗族乡
- Honglin Yi and Miao Ethnic Township 红林彝族苗族乡

== Geography and climate ==
Qianxi ranges in latitude from 26° 45' to 27° 21' N and in longitude from 105° 47' to 106° 26' E, and straddles the middle reaches of the Wu River. It borders Xiuwen County to the east, Qingzhen and Zhijin County to the south, Dafang County to the west, north and northeast, and Jinsha County to the north. As measured from the county seat, the provincial capital Guiyang is 117 kilometres (73 mi) away, while the prefectural seat, Qixingguan, is 115 km (71 mi) off.

Due to its low latitude and elevation above 1,200 m (3,900 ft), Qianxi has a monsoon-influenced humid subtropical climate (Köppen Cwa), with hot, humid summers (though devoid of extreme heat) and cool, damp winters. The monthly 24-hour average temperature ranges from 3.8 °C (38.8 °F) in January to 23.1 °C (73.6 °F) in July, while the annual mean is 14.24 °C (57.6 °F). Rainfall is extremely common year-round, occurring on 187 days of the year (i.e. slightly more than half of the days), but over half of the annual total occurs from June to August.

Climate data for Qianxi, elevation 1,322 m (4,337 ft), (1991–2020 normals, extremes 1971–2010)
Month	Jan	Feb	Mar	Apr	May	Jun	Jul	Aug	Sep	Oct	Nov	Dec	Year
Record high °C (°F)	23.8 (74.8)	30.0 (86.0)	33.0 (91.4)	33.5 (92.3)	35.2 (95.4)	33.9 (93.0)	33.6 (92.5)	35.1 (95.2)	34.8 (94.6)	30.0 (86.0)	26.1 (79.0)	22.6 (72.7)	35.2 (95.4)
Mean daily maximum °C (°F)	7.2 (45.0)	10.5 (50.9)	15.3 (59.5)	20.7 (69.3)	23.8 (74.8)	25.5 (77.9)	27.9 (82.2)	28.0 (82.4)	24.7 (76.5)	19.1 (66.4)	15.2 (59.4)	9.3 (48.7)	18.9 (66.1)
Daily mean °C (°F)	3.8 (38.8)	6.2 (43.2)	10.4 (50.7)	15.5 (59.9)	18.9 (66.0)	21.3 (70.3)	23.3 (73.9)	22.9 (73.2)	19.9 (67.8)	15.2 (59.4)	11.0 (51.8)	5.7 (42.3)	14.5 (58.1)
Mean daily minimum °C (°F)	1.7 (35.1)	3.4 (38.1)	7.1 (44.8)	11.8 (53.2)	15.3 (59.5)	18.3 (64.9)	19.9 (67.8)	19.2 (66.6)	16.5 (61.7)	12.6 (54.7)	8.1 (46.6)	3.2 (37.8)	11.4 (52.6)
Record low °C (°F)	−7.4 (18.7)	−10.4 (13.3)	−4.6 (23.7)	0.7 (33.3)	6.7 (44.1)	11.0 (51.8)	9.9 (49.8)	12.7 (54.9)	7.5 (45.5)	2.2 (36.0)	−2.9 (26.8)	−6.3 (20.7)	−10.4 (13.3)
Average precipitation mm (inches)	22.5 (0.89)	16.2 (0.64)	29.3 (1.15)	70.3 (2.77)	136.8 (5.39)	189.6 (7.46)	160.9 (6.33)	116.3 (4.58)	94.2 (3.71)	78.1 (3.07)	27.8 (1.09)	16.0 (0.63)	958 (37.71)
Average precipitation days (≥ 0.1 mm)	17.0	14.2	15.8	15.9	17.5	17.6	14.3	12.5	11.9	16.5	11.6	14.0	178.8
Average snowy days	5.2	2.9	0.3	0	0	0	0	0	0	0	0.1	1.7	10.2
Average relative humidity (%)	86	82	80	77	77	81	79	78	79	84	82	84	81
Mean monthly sunshine hours	34.5	50.1	76.8	102.0	108.7	90.2	150.1	161.9	116.2	66.8	71.8	46.5	1,075.6
Percentage possible sunshine	10	16	21	27	26	22	36	40	32	19	22	14	24
Source 1: China Meteorological Administration
Source 2: Weather China
