= Qinglang Dong and Miao Ethnic Township =

Qinglang Dong and Miao Ethnic Township 青朗侗族苗族乡
- Ethnic township
- Location in Hunan
- Coordinates: 26°54′53″N 109°37′25″E
- Country: People's Republic of China
- Province: Hunan
- Prefecture-level city: Huaihua
- County: Huitong County
- Incorporated (township): 1956

Area
  - Total: 118.13 km^{2} (45.61 sq mi)

Population (2019)
  - Total: 23,708
  - Density: 200.69/km^{2} (519.80/sq mi)
- Time zone: UTC+08:00 (China Standard)
- Postal code: 418308
- Area code: 0745

Chinese name
- Simplified Chinese: 青朗侗族苗族乡
- Traditional Chinese: 青朗侗族苗族鄉
Transcriptions
Standard Mandarin
- Hanyu Pinyin: Qīnglǎng Dòngzú Miáozú Xiāng

Qinglang Dong and Miao Ethnic Township (Chinese: 青朗侗族苗族乡) is an ethnic township in Huitong County, Hunan, China. As of the 2019 census it had a population of 23,708 and an area of 118.13 km^{2} (45.61 sq mi).

== Administrative division ==
As of 2023, the township is divided into one community and thirteen villages:

- New Street Community (新街社区)
- Qinglang (青朗村)
- Anshun (安顺村)
- Muzhou (木舟村)
- Kezhai (客寨村)
- Qixi (七溪村)
- Langjiang (朗江村)
- Huangni (黄泥村)
- Baini (白泥村)
- Dongcheng (东城村)
- Kaitou (凯头村)
- Pojiao (坡脚村)
- Hama (蛤蟆村)
- Xinzhuang (新庄村)

== History ==
During the Republic of China, it belonged to Langjiang Township (朗江乡) and Zhengzhong Township (正中乡).

After the founding of the Communist State, in 1950, it came under the jurisdiction of the 4th District of Huitong County. It was incorporated as a township (青朗乡) in June 1956. In October 1958 it was renamed Langjiang People's Commune (朗江人民公社). Qinglang People's Commune (青朗人民公社) was split from Langjiang People's Commune in March 1961. In May 1984 it reverted to its former name of Qinglang Township. In October 1997 it was renamed Qinglang Dong and Miao Ethnic Township. In 2015, the town of Langjiang (朗江镇) merged into the township.

== Geography ==
The township is situated in western Huitong County. The township shares a border with Paotuan Dong and Miao Ethnic Township and Puwen Dong and Miao Ethnic Township to the west, Lincheng Town to the east, Pingcun Town to the north, and Guangping Town to the south.

The highest point in the township is Zhengqijie Mountain (正齐界) which stands 608 metres (1,995 ft) above sea level. The lowest point is Huangjiatuan (黄家团), at 269 metres (883 ft) above sea level.

The Qu River flows through the township south to north.

== Economy ==
The economy of the township is supported primarily by agriculture.

The region has an abundance of gold.

== Demographics ==
Historical population
Year	Pop.	±%
2005	20,652	—
2011	23,628	+14.4%
2019	23,708	+0.3%

The 2019 census reported the town had a population of 23,708.
