= Jinzhu, Huitong County =

Jinzhu 金竹镇
- Town
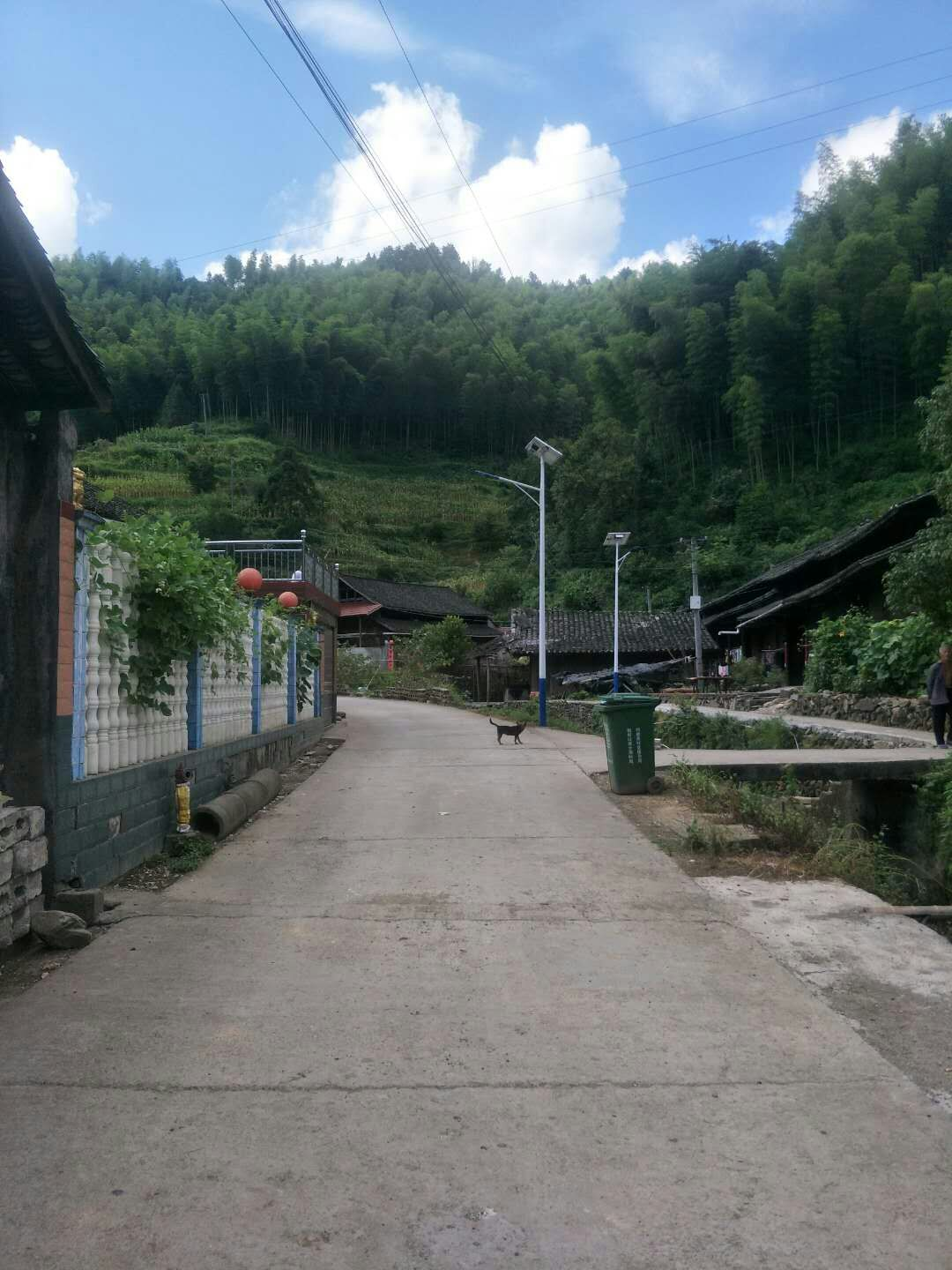
- Residential buildings in Jinzhu Town

- Location in Hunan
- Coordinates: 27°00′41″N 109°50′30″E
- Country: People's Republic of China
- Province: Hunan
- Prefecture-level city: Huaihua
- County: Huitong County
- Designated (town): 2015

Area
  - Total: 201.52 km^{2} (77.81 sq mi)

Population (2019)
  - Total: 20,450
  - Density: 101.5/km^{2} (262.8/sq mi)
- Time zone: UTC+08:00 (China Standard)
- Postal code: 418305
- Area code: 0745

Chinese name
- Simplified Chinese: 金竹镇
- Traditional Chinese: 金竹鎮
Transcriptions
Standard Mandarin
- Hanyu Pinyin: Jīnzhú Zhèn

Jinzhu (Chinese: 金竹镇) is a town in Huitong County, Hunan, China. As of the 2023 census it had a population of 20,450 and an area of 201.52 square kilometres (77.81 sq mi).

== Administrative division ==
As of 2021, the town is divided into fifteen villages:

- Jinping (金坪村)
- Tongmu (桐木村)
- Yanjiao (岩脚村)
- Huangtuba (黄土坝村)
- Qingjiang (清江村)
- Diling (地灵村)
- Shiqi (石其村)
- Shuiwei (水尾村)
- Xiaojia (肖家村)
- Wangjia (王家村)
- Dongyue (东岳村)
- Loujiao (楼脚村)
- Pojiao (坡脚村)
- Banshan (半山村)
- Laotuan (老团村)

== History ==
During the Republic of China, it belonged to Jinzhu Township (金竹乡), Anhuai Township (安怀乡), Xiongxi Township (雄溪乡), and Shuangxi Township (双溪乡).

After the founding of the Communist State, in 1950, it came under the jurisdiction of the 2nd District of Huitong County. Its name was changed to Buzi District (堡子区) in June 1955. In 2015, Xiaojia Township (肖家乡) and Jinlong Township (金龙乡) merged to form Jinzhu Town.

== Geography ==
The town is located on the northeast of Huitong County. It shares a border with Buzi Town to the west, Ruoshui Town to the east, Ma'an Town and Hongjiang to the north, and Lincheng Town to the south.

== Economy ==
The economy is supported primarily by agriculture and forestry. Its economy is dominated by Phyllostachys edulis. The region has an abundance of coal and gold.

== Demographics ==
As of 2019, the National Bureau of Statistics of China estimates the town's population now to be 20,450.

Historical population
Year	Pop.	±%
2011	20,403	—
2018	20,431	+0.1%
2019	20,450	+0.1%
