= Ma'an, Huitong County =

Ma'an 马鞍镇
- Town
- Location in Hunan
- Coordinates: 27°03′13″N 109°44′29″E
- Country: People's Republic of China
- Province: Hunan
- Prefecture-level city: Huaihua
- County: Huitong County
- Incorporated (township): 1956
- Designated (town): 2002

Area
  - Total: 120.71 km^{2} (46.61 sq mi)

Population (2019)
  - Total: 13,404
  - Density: 111.04/km^{2} (287.60/sq mi)
- Time zone: UTC+08:00 (China Standard)
- Postal code: 418304
- Area code: 0745

Chinese name
- Simplified Chinese: 马鞍镇
- Traditional Chinese: 馬鞍鎮
Transcriptions
Standard Mandarin
- Hanyu Pinyin: Mǎ'ān Zhèn

Ma'an (Chinese: 马鞍镇) is a town in Huitong County, Hunan, China. As of the 2019 census it had a population of 13,404 and an area of 120.71 square kilometres (46.61 sq mi).

== Etymology ==
It named after Ma'an Mountain (马鞍山).

== Administrative division ==
As of 2021, the town is divided into one community and eleven villages:

- Qingjiangxi Community (青江溪社区)
- Xiangjian (相见村)
- Yanglong (阳隆村)
- Huangtu (黄土村)
- Ma'an (马鞍村)
- Beichang (北厂村)
- Naoxi (闹溪村)
- Matian (马田村)
- Huangjia (黄家村)
- Tangjia (唐家村)
- Yinshan (银山村)
- Xiaoxikou (小溪口村)

== History ==
During the Republic of China, the region belonged to Xinbao Township (新宝乡) and Huai'an Township (怀安乡).

After the founding of the Communist State, in November, it came under the jurisdiction of the 2nd District and 3rd District. It was incorporated as a township in June 1956 and renamed Ma'an People's Commune (马鞍人民公社) in October 1958. In May 1984 it reverted to its former name of Ma'an Township. In September 2002 it was upgraded to a town.

== Geography ==
The town lies at the northern of Huitong County, bordering Baotian Dong and Miao Ethnic Township to the west, towns of Buzi and Pingcun to the south, Hongjiang to the north, and the town of Jinzhu to the east.

The highest point in the town is Wanghoudong (王后洞) which stands 884 metres (2,900 ft) above sea level. The lowest point is Huangshatang (黄沙塘), which, at 565 metres (1,854 ft) above sea level.

The Qingjiang Stream (清江溪) and Naotang Stream (闹唐溪), both are tributaries of the Yuan River, pass through the town north to south.

== Economy ==
The local economy is primarily based upon agriculture and forestry. The region has an abundance of gold, antimony, and zinc.

== Demographics ==
As of 2019, the National Bureau of Statistics of China estimates the town's population now to be 13,404.

Historical population
Year	Pop.	±%
2005	12,813	—
2011	13,131	+2.5%
2018	13,395	+2.0%
2019	13,404	+0.1%

== Transportation ==
The G65 Baotou–Maoming Expressway passes across the town north to south.

The Jiaozuo–Liuzhou railway crosses the town north to south.
