= Qu River (Yuan River tributary) =

- Native name: 渠江 (Chinese)

Physical characteristics
- Mouth: Yuan River
  - location: Tuokou Town, Hongjiang City
  - coordinates: 27°07′26″N 109°36′55″E
- Length: 285 km (177 mi)
- Basin size: 6,772 km^{2} (2,615 mi^{2})

Basin features
- Waterbodies: Daxi Reservoir (大溪水库)

Qu River (Chinese: 渠江; pinyin: Qú Jiāng), formerly known as Xu River (叙水; Xù Shuǐ), is a river in western Hunan of China. It is 285 square kilometres (110 mi^{2}) long and is a tributary of Yuan River, draining an area of 6,772 square kilometres (2,615 sq mi).

This river has two sources, east and west. The west source originates from Liping County of Guizhou, and is called Boyang River (播阳河) or Hongzhou River (洪州河). Heading eastward, it enters the border of Hunan. The east source known as the Tongdao River (通道河) or Changping River (长平水), originates from Chengbu Miao Autonomous County, and flows northwest to Suining County, entering the territory of Tongdao Dong Autonomous County. This river flows from Chengbu Miao Autonomous County and Liping County into Gantang Town of Jingzhou Miao and Dong Autonomous County, then pasts Lianshan Township, Lincheng Town, Guangping Town, Qinglang Dong and Miao Ethnic Township, and Mobin Dong and Miao Ethnic Township of Huitong County, and feeds into the Yuan River in Tuokou Town of Hongjiang City.

== Tributaries ==
- Sixiang River (四乡河), originates from Liping County, Guizhou, is 70 kilometres (43 mi) long with a drainage area of 612 square kilometres (236 sq mi).
- Yatenbao River (牙屯堡河), originates from Tongdao Dong Autonomous County, is 52 kilometres (32 mi) long with a drainage area of 226 square kilometres (87 sq mi).
- Shuang River (双江), originates from Tongdao Dong Autonomous County, is 52 kilometres (32 mi) long with a drainage area of 379 square kilometres (146 sq mi).
- Yang River (洋溪), originates from the Suining County, is 71 kilometres (44 mi) long with a drainage area of 439 square kilometres (169 sq mi).
- Laoya River (老鸦溪), also known as Zhaiya River (寨牙河), is 47 kilometres (29 mi) long and has a drainage area of 280 square kilometres (110 sq mi).
- Guangping River (广坪河), originates from Pingxia Mountain (坪下山) in Jingzhou Miao and Dong Autonomous County, has a total length of 83 kilometres (52 mi) and a drainage area of 802 square kilometres (310 sq mi).
- Huitong River (会同河), also known as Qing River (青溪), formerly known as Ping River (平川), Xiaoyou River (小由江), and Tan River (潭溪), has a total length of 38 kilometres (24 mi) and a drainage area of 267 square kilometres (103 sq mi).
- Guangping River (广坪河), formerly known as Lang River (朗江), Gong River (恭水), and Dayu River (大由江), has a length of 81 kilometres (50 mi) and a drainage area of 320 square kilometres (120 sq mi).
- The Diling River (地灵河), originates from the southern foot of Tianlong Mountain (天龙山) in Sanzao Township, Jingzhou Miao and Dong Autonomous County, with a length of 74 kilometres (46 mi) and a drainage area of 342 square kilometres (132 sq mi).

== Major counties and cities along the river ==
- Liping County
- Chengbu Miao Autonomous County
- Suining County
- Tongdao Dong Autonomous County
- Huitong County
- Hongjiang City
- Jingzhou Miao and Dong Autonomous County
