= Puwen Dong and Miao Ethnic Township =

Puwen Dong and Miao Ethnic Township 蒲稳侗族苗族乡
- Ethnic township
- Location in Hunan
- Coordinates: 26°57′18″N 109°33′42″E
- Country: People's Republic of China
- Province: Hunan
- Prefecture-level city: Huaihua
- County: Huitong County
- Incorporated (township): 1956

Area
  - Total: 56.58 km^{2} (21.85 sq mi)

Population (2019)
  - Total: 10,077
  - Density: 178.1/km^{2} (461.3/sq mi)
- Time zone: UTC+08:00 (China Standard)
- Postal code: 418308
- Area code: 0745

Chinese name
- Simplified Chinese: 蒲稳侗族苗族乡
- Traditional Chinese: 蒲稳侗族苗族鄉
Transcriptions
Standard Mandarin
- Hanyu Pinyin: Púwěn Dòngzú Miáozú Xiāng

Puwen Dong and Miao Ethnic Township (Chinese: 蒲稳侗族苗族乡) is an ethnic township in Huitong County, Hunan, China. As of the 2019 census it had a population of 10,077 and an area of 56.58 square kilometres (21.85 sq mi).

== Administrative division ==
As of 2023, the township is divided into six villages:

- Puwen (蒲稳村)
- Baomu (报木村)
- Xiajie (夏结村)
- Wengle (翁乐村)
- Yangxi (阳溪村)
- Daluotian (大罗田村)

== History ==
During the Republic of China, it belonged to Langjiang Township (朗江乡).

After the founding of the Communist State, in 1950, it came under the jurisdiction of the 4th District of Huitong County. In June 1955 it became a part of Dongcheng District (东城区). Puwen Township (蒲稳乡) was incorporated in June 1956. It became part of the newly formed Langjiang People's Commune (朗江人民公社) in September 1958. In March 1961, Puwen People's Commune (蒲稳人民公社) was split from Langjiang People's Commune. In May 1984 it reverted to its former name of Puwen Township. In October 1997 it was renamed Puwen Dong and Miao Ethnic Township.

== Geography ==
The township lies at the west of Huitong County, bordering Tianzhu County to the west, Paotuan Dong and Miao Ethnic Township to the south, Mobin Dong and Miao Ethnic Township to the north, and Qinglang Dong and Miao Ethnic Township to the east and southeast.

The highest point is the Eight Immortals Mountain (八仙山), elevation 774 metres (2,539 ft).

== Economy ==
The township's economy is based on agricultural resources.

The region has an abundance of gold.

== Demographics ==
The 2019 census reported the town had a population of 10,077.

Historical population
Year	Pop.	±%
2005	9,360	—
2018	9,974	+6.6%
2019	10,077	+1.0%
