= Shaxi, Huitong County =

Shaxi Township 沙溪乡
- Township
- Location in Hunan
- Coordinates: 26°46′38″N 109°55′19″E
- Country: People's Republic of China
- Province: Hunan
- Prefecture-level city: Huaihua
- County: Huitong County
- Incorporated (township): 1956

Area
  - Total: 130.15 km^{2} (50.25 sq mi)

Population (2019)
  - Total: 15,419
  - Density: 118.47/km^{2} (306.84/sq mi)
- Time zone: UTC+08:00 (China Standard)
- Area code: 0745

Chinese name
- Simplified Chinese: 沙溪乡
- Traditional Chinese: 沙溪鄉
Transcriptions
Standard Mandarin
- Hanyu Pinyin: Shāxī Xiāng

Shaxi Township (Chinese: 沙溪乡) is a township in Huitong County, Hunan, China. As of the 2019 census it had a population of 15,419 and an area of 130.15 square kilometres (50.25 sq mi).

== Administrative division ==
As of 2023, the township is divided into 13 villages:

- Shaxi (沙溪村)
- Guya (古雅村)
- Fengyang (凤羊村)
- Shitian (市田村)
- Zhongquan (中全村)
- Luoyang (洛阳村)
- Wandong (玩洞村)
- Tangwan (塘湾村)
- Lengxi (冷溪村)
- Shaijin (晒金村)
- Muzhai (木寨村)
- Fengshan (丰山村)
- Baolian (宝联村)

== History ==
During the Republic of China, it belonged to Fengshan Township (丰山乡).

After the founding of the Communist State, in July 1950, it came under the jurisdiction of the 7th District of Huitong County. In June 1955, it was under the jurisdiction of Shaxi District (沙溪区). In June 1956, Shaxi Township (沙溪乡) was set up. In October 1958, it was changed to Shaxi People's Commune (沙溪人民公社). In May 1984, it reverted to its former name of Shaxi Township.

== Geography ==
Shaxi Township is located on the southeast of Huitong County. It is surrounded by Tuanhe Town on the north, Lincheng Town on the west, Jinziyan Dong and Miao Ethnic Township on the east, and Jingzhou Miao and Dong Autonomous County and Suining County on the south.

The highest point is Jiuniutang (九牛塘), elevation 788 metres (2,585 ft). The lowest point is Jinsha Power Station (金沙电站), which, at 367 metres (1,204 ft) above sea level.

Streams of Qushui River (渠水河), Wushui River (巫水河) and Ruoshui River (若水河) winds through the township.

Shaxi Township is in the subtropical monsoon climate zone, with an average annual temperature of 15.7–18.6 °C (60.3–65.5 °F), total annual rainfall of 1,750–1,900-millimetre (69–75 in), and a frost-free period of 255 to 310 days.

== Economy ==
The economy is supported primarily by agriculture.

The region abounds with coal, limestone, granite, quartz, tungsten, and molybdenum.

== Demographics ==
As of 2019, the National Bureau of Statistics of China estimates the township's population now to be 15,419.

Historical population
Year	Pop.	±%
2011	14,961	—
2018	15,352	+2.6%
2019	15,419	+0.4%

== Tourist attractions ==
The Hall of Thunder God (雷公殿) is a Taoist temple in the township, which was built in 1738 during the ruling of Qianlong Emperor of the Qing dynasty (1644–1911).

== Transportation ==
The Provincial Highway S222 is a north–south highway in the town.
