= Shaxi =

Shaxi may refer to the following towns in China:

- Shaxi, Zhangpu (沙西镇), town in Zhangpu County, Fujian

Written as "沙溪镇":

- Shaxi (Chaozhou), in Chao'an County, Guangdong
- Shaxi, Shaoguan, Qujiang District, Shaoguan, Guangdong
- Shaxi, Zhongshan, Guangdong
- Shaxi, Miluo, in Miluo City, Hunan
- Shaxi, Taicang, Jiangsu
- Shaxi, Shangrao, in Xinzhou District, Shangrao, Jiangxi
- Shaxi, Yongfeng, in Yongfeng County, Jiangxi
- Shaxi, Tongjiang, in Tongjiang County, Sichuan
- Shaxi, Jianchuan County, Yunnan
- Shaxi, Xinchang, in Xinchang County, Zhejiang

Written as "沙溪乡":

- Shaxi, Huitong County, a township of Huitong County, Hunan.
- Shaxi Tujia Ethnic Township, in Dejiang County, Guizhou
- Shaxi, Mingxi County, in Mingxi County, Fujian
- Shaxi, Lichuan, in Lichuan, Hubei
