= Tuanhe =

Tuanhe 团河镇
- Town
- Location in Hunan
- Coordinates: 26°52′18″N 109°56′28″E
- Country: People's Republic of China
- Province: Hunan
- Prefecture-level city: Huaihua
- County: Huitong County
- Incorporated (township): 1956
- Designated (town): 1995

Area
  - Total: 132.24 km^{2} (51.06 sq mi)

Population (2019)
  - Total: 13,929
  - Density: 105.33/km^{2} (272.81/sq mi)
- Time zone: UTC+08:00 (China Standard)
- Postal code: 418313
- Area code: 0745

Chinese name
- Simplified Chinese: 团河镇
- Traditional Chinese: 團河鎮
Transcriptions
Standard Mandarin
- Hanyu Pinyin: Tuánhé Zhèn

Tuanhe (Chinese: 团河镇) is a town in Huitong County, Hunan, China. As of the 2023 census it had a population of 13,929 and an area of 132.24 square kilometres (51.06 sq mi).

== Administrative division ==
As of 2021, the town is divided into one community and ten villages:

- Zhuge Jing Community (诸葛井社区)
- Tuanhe (团河村)
- Mantang (漫塘村)
- Xiangyang (向阳村)
- Guanzhou (官舟村)
- Diaotang (吊塘村)
- Nanmu (楠木村)
- Shengchu (盛储村)
- Yanchong (燕冲村)
- Zhupo (竹坡村)
- Lipo (力宏村)

== History ==
It belonged to Fengshan Township (丰山乡) during the Republic of China.

After the establishment of the Communist State, in April 1950, it came under the jurisdiction of the 6th District of Huitong County. It was renamed Tuanhe District (团河区) in May 1955 and was changed to Tuanhe Township in October 1956. In September 1958, it was under the jurisdiction of Shaxi People's Commune (沙溪人民公社) and renamed Tuanhe People's Commune (团河人民公社) in March 1961. It reverted to its former name of Tuanhe Township in May 1984 and was upgraded to a town in October 1995.

== Geography ==
The town is located in eastern Huitong County. It is bordered to the north by Ruoshui Town, to the east by Jinziyan Dong and Miao Ethnic Township, to the south by Shaxi Township, and to the west by Lincheng Town.

The highest point in the town is Tianping Mountain (天平山) which stands 913 metres (2,995 ft) above sea level. The lowest point is the bank of Ruoshui River in the village of Guanzhou (官舟村的若水河岸), at 200 metres (660 ft) above sea level.

Tributaries of Ruoshui River (若水河) flow through the town.

== Economy ==
The local economy is primarily based upon agriculture and local industry. The region has an abundance of uranium, lead, zinc, and gold.

== Demographics ==
As of 2019, the National Bureau of Statistics of China estimates the town's population now to be 13,929.

Historical population
Year	Pop.	±%
2005	13,232	—
2011	13,500	+2.0%
2018	13,365	−1.0%
2019	13,929	+4.2%

== Transportation ==
The Provincial Highway S222 passes across the town north to south.
