= Gaoyi Township =

Gaoyi Township 高椅乡
- Township
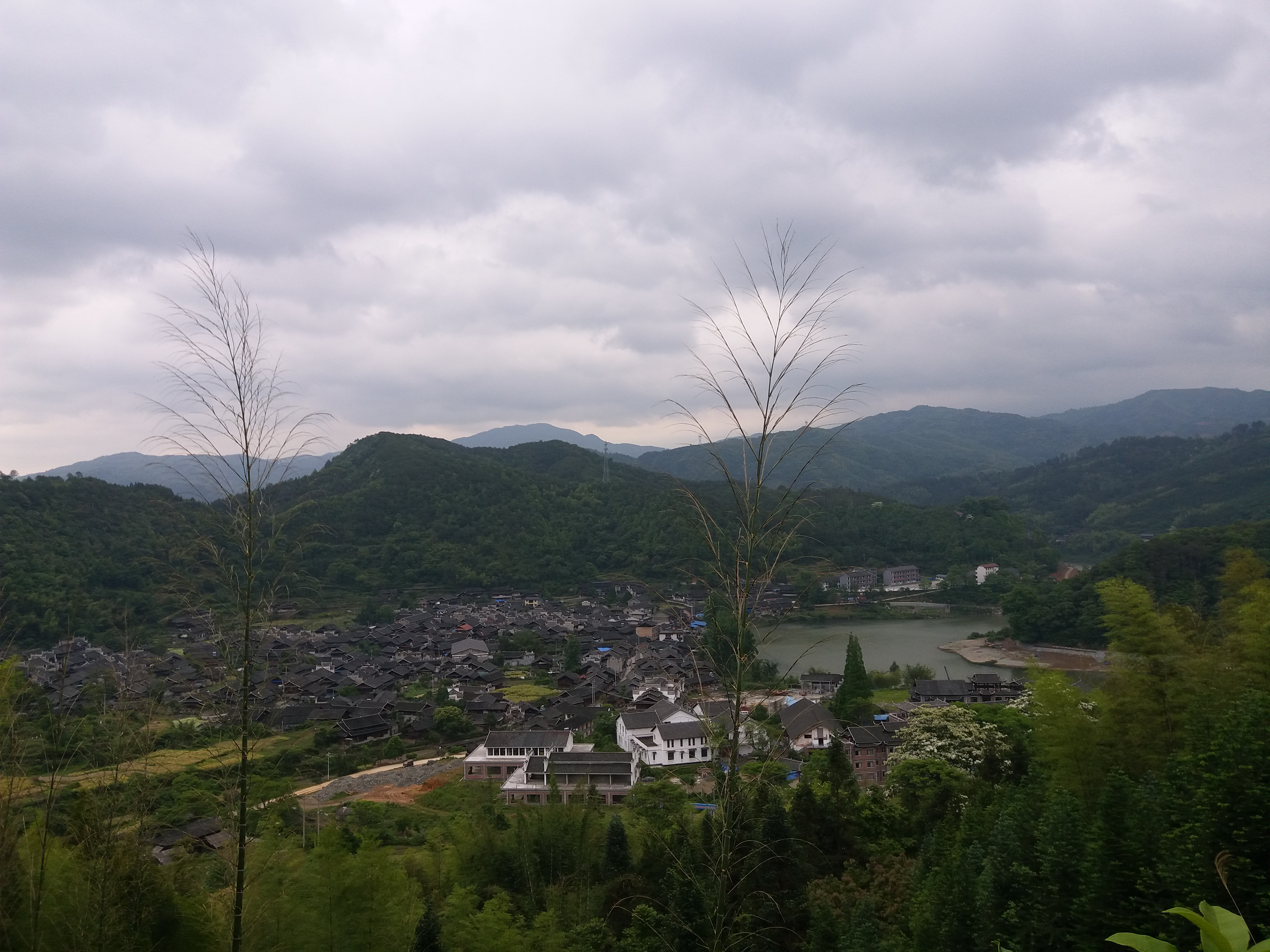
- A panoramic view of Gaoyi Ancient Village in May 2018

- Location in Hunan
- Coordinates: 26°57′22″N 110°00′52″E
- Country: People's Republic of China
- Province: Hunan
- Prefecture-level city: Huaihua
- County: Huitong County
- Incorporated (township): 1956

Area
  - Total: 99 km^{2} (38 sq mi)

Population (2019)
  - Total: 9,220
  - Density: 93/km^{2} (240/sq mi)
- Time zone: UTC+08:00 (China Standard)
- Postal code: 418318
- Area code: 0745

Chinese name
- Simplified Chinese: 高椅乡
- Traditional Chinese: 高椅鄉
Transcriptions
Standard Mandarin
- Hanyu Pinyin: Gāoyǐ Xiāng

Gaoyi Township (Chinese: 高椅乡) is a rural township in Huitong County, Hunan, China. It is surrounded by Ruoshui Town on the northwest, Tuanhe Town on the southwest, Jinziyan Township on the south, Matang Township on the southeast, and Longchuantang Township on the northeast. As of the 2019 census it had a population of 9220 and an area of 99 square kilometres (38 sq mi).

== Administrative division ==
As of 2023, it has 12 villages:

- Sanzhou (三洲村)
- Shuangtan (双滩村)
- Lingtou (岭头村)
- Wengjiang Village (翁江村)
- Hongpo (红坡村)
- Xuefeng (雪峰村)
- Huaijian (槐枧村)
- Wengtao (翁桃村)
- Wenggao (翁高村)
- Dengjia (邓家村)
- Gaoyi (高椅村)
- Yunmeng (云梦村)

== History ==
During the Republic of China, it belonged to Gaoshi Township (高市乡).

After the Founding of the Communist State, in 1950, it came under the jurisdiction of the 1st District of Huitong County. In June 1955, it became part of Ruoshui District (若水区). It was incorporated as a township named "Wengtao Township" (翁桃乡) in June 1956. In October 1958 it was renamed Ruoshui People's Commune (若水人民公社) and renamed again Wengtao People's Commune (翁桃人民公社) in March 1961 and two months later renamed Gaoyi People's Commune (高椅人民公社) for the third time. In May 1984 it reverted to its former name of Gaoyi Township.

== Economy ==
Gaoyi Township's economy is dominated by tourism and special local products, such as vivipara, fish, orange, peach, bacon, chili sauce, embroidery, and bamboo weaving.

== Geography ==
The Wu River flows through the township.

== Demographics ==
As of 2019, the National Bureau of Statistics of China estimates the township's population now to be 15,528.

Historical population
Year	Pop.	±%
2011	9,219	—
2016	8,865	−3.8%
2018	9,274	+4.6%
2019	9,220	−0.6%

== Culture ==
Nuo opera is the most influence local theater.

== Transportation ==
Provincial Highway S222 runs through the township.

== Attractions ==
Gaoyi Village, also known as "Gaoyi Ancient Village", is a famous scenic spot in Hunan. The village has been designated as a "Major National Historical and Cultural Site in Hunan" by the State Council of China.
