= Ruoshui, Huitong County =

Ruoshui 若水镇
- Town
- Location in Hunan
- Coordinates: 27°00′04″N 109°58′20″E
- Country: People's Republic of China
- Province: Hunan
- Prefecture-level city: Huaihua
- County: Huitong County
- Founded: 1103
- Incorporated (township): 1956
- Designated (town): 1995

Area
  - Total: 200.52 km^{2} (77.42 sq mi)

Population (2019)
  - Total: 21,350
  - Density: 106.5/km^{2} (275.8/sq mi)
- Time zone: UTC+08:00 (China Standard)
- Postal code: 418312
- Area code: 0745

Chinese name
- Simplified Chinese: 若水镇
- Traditional Chinese: 若水鎮
Transcriptions
Standard Mandarin
- Hanyu Pinyin: Ruòshuǐ Zhèn

Ruoshui (Chinese: 若水镇) is a town in Huitong County, Hunan, China. As of the 2019 census it had a population of 21,350 and an area of 200.52 square kilometres (77.42 sq mi).

== Administrative division ==
As of 2021, the town is divided into one community and twenty villages:

- Ruoshui Street Community (若水街社区)
- Ruoshui (若水村)
- Lilong (里龙村)
- Jichao (吉巢村)
- Wangdong (望东村)
- Basong (八宋村)
- Luchong (鲁冲村)
- Wayao (瓦窑村)
- Disifang (地四方村)
- Potang (坡塘村)
- Tanmu (檀木村)
- Changtian (长田村)
- Jiaping (架坪村)
- Wengshao (翁杓村)
- Wengdui (翁堆村)
- Wengding (翁顶村)
- Tangjian (塘枧村)
- Baopeng (抱蓬村)
- Huangmao (黄茅村)
- Tuanjie (团结村)
- Dongfeng (东风村)

== History ==
In 1103, during the Northern Song dynasty (960–1127), it was known as Ruoshui Stockade Village (若水寨).

From the Ming and Qing dynasties (1368–1911), the central government installed an agency of patrol and inspection known as Ruoshui Xunjiansi (若水巡检司) to administer the territory.

After the founding of the Communist State, in November 1949, it belonged to the 1st District of Huitong County. It was renamed Ruoshui District (若水区) in May 1955 and was changed to Ruoshui Township in June 1956. In October 1958, it was renamed Ruoshui People's Commune (若水人民公社) and reverted to its former name of Ruoshui Township in May 1984. In October 1995 it was upgraded to a town. In 2015, Huangmao Township (黄茅乡) merged into the town.

== Geography ==
The town is located on the northeast of Huitong County. The town shares a border with Jinzhu Town to the west, Gaoyi Township to the east, and Tuanhe Town to the south.

The Wu River (巫水) flows through the town east to north.

== Economy ==
The local economy is primarily based upon agriculture and local industry. The region abounds with coal, iron, lead, and zinc.

== Demographics ==
As of 2019, the National Bureau of Statistics of China estimates the town's population now to be 21,350.

Historical population
Year	Pop.	±%
2005	14,067	—
2011	13,900	−1.2%
2018	21,303	+53.3%
2019	21,350	+0.2%

== Transportation ==
The town has two provincial highways: the Provincial Highway S222 and Provincial Highway 318.
