= Mobin Dong and Miao Ethnic Township =

Mobin Dong and Miao Ethnic Township 漠滨侗族苗族乡
- Ethnic township
- Location in Hunan
- Coordinates: 27°03′58″N 109°33′37″E
- Country: People's Republic of China
- Province: Hunan
- Prefecture-level city: Huaihua
- County: Huitong County

Area
  - Total: 77.82 km^{2} (30.05 sq mi)

Population (2019)
  - Total: 13,786
  - Density: 177.2/km^{2} (458.8/sq mi)
- Time zone: UTC+08:00 (China Standard)
- Postal code: 418300
- Area code: 0745

Chinese name
- Simplified Chinese: 漠滨侗族苗族乡
- Traditional Chinese: 漠濱侗族苗族鄉
Transcriptions
Standard Mandarin
- Hanyu Pinyin: Mòbīn Dòngzú Miáozú Xiāng

Mobin Dong and Miao Ethnic Township (Chinese: 漠滨侗族苗族乡) is an ethnic township in Huitong County, Hunan, China. As of the 2019 census it had a population of 13,786 and an area of 77.82 square kilometres (30.05 sq mi).

== Administrative division ==
As of 2023, the township is divided into one community and seven villages:

- Binjiang Community (滨江社区)
- Mobin (漠滨村)
- Jintangxi (金塘溪村)
- Houjiapo (侯家坡村)
- Jinzi (金子村)
- Shadui (沙堆村)
- Dongtouchong (洞头冲村)
- Dongtoutang (洞头塘村)

== History ==
Mobin was incorporated as a township during the Republic of China.

After the founding of the Communist State, in 1950, it came under the jurisdiction of the 4th District of Huitong County. In June 1955, it was under the jurisdiction of Dongcheng District (东城区). A year later, Mobin Township (漠滨乡) was set up. In September 1958, it was changed to Mobin People's Commune (漠滨人民公社). In May 1984 it reverted to its former name of Mobin Township. In October 1997, it was named Mobin Dong and Miao Ethnic Township.

== Geography ==
The township lies at the northwest of Huitong County, bordering Puwen Dong and Miao Ethnic Township and Tianzhu County to the west, Qinglang Dong and Miao Ethnic Township to the south, Zhijiang Dong Autonomous County to the north, and Hongjiang to the east.

The highest point in the township is Hongpojian (红坡尖) which stands 725 metres (2,379 ft) above sea level. The lowest point is Pingxikou (坪溪口), which, at 210 metres (690 ft) above sea level.

There are two major rivers wind through the township: Qu River and Qingshui River (清水江).

== Economy ==
The local economy is primarily based upon agriculture.

The region abounds with gold.

== Demographics ==
The 2019 census reported the town had a population of 13,786.

Historical population
Year	Pop.	±%
2005	12,900	—
2018	13,044	+1.1%
2019	13,786	+5.7%

== Tourist attractions ==
The township has three Dong ethnic wind-rain bridges and a Dong ethnic drum tower.
