= Lianshan, Huitong County =

Lianshan Township 连山乡
- Township
- Location in Hunan
- Coordinates: 26°48′08″N 109°42′12″E
- Country: People's Republic of China
- Province: Hunan
- Prefecture-level city: Huaihua
- County: Huitong County
- Incorporated (township): 1956

Area
  - Urban: 68.09 km^{2} (26.29 sq mi)

Population (2019)
  - Township: 15,528
- Time zone: UTC+08:00 (China Standard)
- Postal code: 418301
- Area code: 0745

Chinese name
- Simplified Chinese: 连山乡
- Traditional Chinese: 連山鄉
Transcriptions
Standard Mandarin
- Hanyu Pinyin: Liánshān Xiāng

Lianshan Township (Chinese: 连山乡) is a township in Huitong County, Hunan, China. As of the 2019 census it had a population of 15,528 and an area of 68.09 square kilometres (26.29 sq mi).

== Administrative division ==
As of 2023, the township is divided into 数 villages:

- Jianshe (建设村)
- Lianshan (连山村)
- Daping (大坪村)
- Xuanshui (漩水村)
- Huoshenpo (火神坡村)
- Gaoyong (高涌村)
- Baozhao (宝照村)
- Liuhuang (六黄村)

== History ==
In 1947 during the Republic of China, it belonged to Heping Township (和平乡).

After the founding of the Communist State, in 1950, it came under the jurisdiction of the 8th District of Huitong County. It was incorporated as a township in May 1956. It was renamed Lianshan People's Commune (连山人民公社) in September 1958. In May 1984 it reverted to its former name of Lianshan Township.

== Geography ==
Lianshan Township is located on the south of Huitong County. It is bordered to the north and east by Lincheng Town, to the east by Guangping Town, and to the south by Jingzhou Miao and Dong Autonomous County.

The highest point in the township is Daliujie (大柳界), which, at 434 metres (1,424 ft) above sea level.

The Qu River flows through the township.

== Economy ==
The local economy is primarily based upon agriculture and local industry.

The region abounds with gold, limestone, and sand.

== Demographics ==
As of 2019, the National Bureau of Statistics of China estimates the township's population now to be 15,528.

Historical population
Year	Pop.	±%
2011	14,600	—
2018	15,429	+5.7%
2019	15,528	+0.6%

== Transportation ==
The National Highway G209 is a north–south highway in the township.

The G65 Baotou–Maoming Expressway passes across the town north to south.
