= Zhijiang railway station =

Zhijiang railway station may refer to the following in China:

- Zhijiang railway station (Hunan) (芷江站), in Huaihua, Hunan
- Zhijiang railway station (Hubei) (枝江站), in Yichang, Hubei
