= Pingcun =

Pingcun 坪村镇
- Town
- Location in Hunan
- Coordinates: 26°57′12″N 109°44′21″E
- Country: People's Republic of China
- Province: Hunan
- Prefecture-level city: Huaihua
- County: Huitong County
- Incorporated (township): 1956
- Designated (town): 1985

Area
  - Total: 76.68 km^{2} (29.61 sq mi)

Population (2019)
  - Total: 23,090
  - Density: 301.1/km^{2} (779.9/sq mi)
- Time zone: UTC+08:00 (China Standard)
- Postal code: 418302
- Area code: 0745

Chinese name
- Simplified Chinese: 坪村镇
- Traditional Chinese: 坪村鎮
Transcriptions
Standard Mandarin
- Hanyu Pinyin: Píngcūn Zhèn

Pingcun (Chinese: 坪村镇) is a town in Huitong County, Hunan, China. As of the 2019 census it had a population of 23,090 and an area of 76.68 square kilometres (29.61 sq mi).

== Administrative division ==
As of 2021, the town is divided into three communities and twelve villages:

- Fengxiangling Community (枫响铃社区)
- Yuanchong Railway Station Community (元冲火车站社区)
- Bus Station Community (汽车站社区)
- Muzhen (木臻村)
- Puping (铺坪村)
- Qingshui (清水村; 'Clean Water Village')
- Fengmu (枫木村; 'Maple Tree Village')
- Dashun (大顺村)
- Maotian (毛田村)
- Gao (高村)
- Wuxing (五星村; 'Five Stars Village')
- Hongqi (红旗村; 'Red Flag Village')
- Ping (坪村)
- Xinwu (新屋村; 'New House Village')
- Matang (麻塘村)

== History ==
The area was known as Fulong Township (伏龙乡; 'Crouching Dragon Township') during the Republic of China.

After the founding of the People's Republic of China, in November 1949, it came under the jurisdiction of the Third District (第三区) of Huitong County. In June 1955, it was renamed Pingcun District (坪村区) and soon was changed to Pingcun Township (坪村乡). In September 1958, the Red Flag People's Commune (红旗人民公社) was set up and later renamed Pingcun People's Commune (坪村人民公社). It reverted to its former name of Pingcun Township in May 1984. In April 1985 it was upgraded to a town.

== Geography ==
The town is located on the central part of Huitong County. The town lies at the central part of Huitong County, bordering Qinglang Dong and Miao Ethnic Township to the west, Lincheng Town to the south, Baotian Dong and Miao Ethnic Township to the north, and Buzi Town to the east.

The highest point in the town is White Clouds Mountain (白云头) which stands 764 metres (2,507 ft) above sea level. The lowest point is Tangbao Hill (唐堡山), which, at 278 metres (912 ft) above sea level.

The Huitong River flows through the town northeast to south.

== Economy ==
The local economy is primarily based upon agriculture and local industry. The region abounds with limestone, gold, and clay.

== Demographics ==
As of 2019, the National Bureau of Statistics of China estimates the town's population now to be 23,090.

Historical population
Year	Pop.	±%
2005	25,000	—
2011	25,300	+1.2%
2018	22,853	−9.7%
2019	23,090	+1.0%

== Transportation ==
The Yuanchong Railway Station (园冲火车站) serves the town.

The National Highway G209 and G65 pass across the eastern town north to south.
