= Ruoshui =

Ruoshui, may refer to:

- Ruo Shui, a major river system of northern China.
- Ruoshui, Huitong County, a town in Huitong County, Hunan, China.
- Ruoshui, Mianning County, a town in Mianning County, Sichuan, China.
