= Baotian Dong and Miao Ethnic Township =

Baotian Dong and Miao Ethnic Township 宝田侗族苗族乡
- Ethnic township
- Location in Hunan
- Coordinates: 27°01′24″N 109°40′00″E
- Country: People's Republic of China
- Province: Hunan
- Prefecture-level city: Huaihua
- County: Huitong County

Area
  - Total: 64.56 km^{2} (24.93 sq mi)

Population (2019)
  - Total: 10,008
  - Density: 155.0/km^{2} (401.5/sq mi)
- Time zone: UTC+08:00 (China Standard)
- Postal code: 418302
- Area code: 0745

Chinese name
- Simplified Chinese: 宝田侗族苗族乡
- Traditional Chinese: 寶田侗族苗族鄉
Transcriptions
Standard Mandarin
- Hanyu Pinyin: Bǎotián Dòngzú Miáozú Xiāng

Baotian Dong and Miao Ethnic Township (Chinese: 宝田侗族苗族乡) is an ethnic township in Huitong County, Hunan, China. As of the 2019 census it had a population of 10,008 and an area of 64.56 square kilometres (24.93 sq mi).

== Administrative division ==
As of 2023, the township is divided into six villages:

- Baotian (宝田村)
- Wangtian (旺田村)
- Wengliao (翁料村)
- Sanxi (三溪村)
- Bingxi (炳溪村)
- Liandao Miaozhai (连道苗寨村)

== History ==
It was known as Xinbao Township (新宝乡) during the Republic of China.

After the establishment of the Communist State, in 1950, it came under the jurisdiction of the 3rd District of Huitong County. It was renamed Pingcun District (坪村区) in June 1955 and renamed again Baotian Township (宝田乡) a year later. In September 1958, it was changed to Baotian People's Commune (宝田人民公社). In May 1984 it reverted to its former name of Baotian Township. In October 1997, Baotian Dong and Miao Ethnic Township was officially formed.

== Geography ==
Baotian Dong and Miao Ethnic Township is located on the northwest of Huitong County. It is surrounded by Hongjiang on the north and west, Langjiang Town and Mobin Dong and Miao Ethnic Township on the southwest, Ma'an Town on the east, and Pingcun Town on the southeast.

The highest point in the township is Yanyingpo (岩鹰坡) which stands 840 metres (2,760 ft) above sea level. The lowest point is Zhangjiachong (张家冲), which, at 212 metres (696 ft) above sea level.

== Economy ==
The economy of the township is supported primarily by agriculture. The region abounds with antimony.

== Demographics ==
As of 2019, the National Bureau of Statistics of China estimates the township's population now to be 10,008.

Historical population
Year	Pop.	±%
2005	9,683	—
2011	10,145	+4.8%
2018	9,505	−6.3%
2019	10,008	+5.3%

== Culture ==
In 2009, the traditional folk program "Playing Drums and Hoeing Tea" (打鼓锄茶) in the township was listed as a provincial-level intangible cultural heritage by the Hunan Provincial People's Government.
