= Diling Township =

Diling Township 地灵乡
- Township
- Location in Hunan
- Coordinates: 26°43′40″N 109°35′41″E
- Country: People's Republic of China
- Province: Hunan
- Prefecture-level city: Huaihua
- County: Huitong County
- Incorporated (township): 1956

Area
  - Total: 87.1 km^{2} (33.6 sq mi)

Population (2019)
  - Total: 10,174
  - Density: 117/km^{2} (303/sq mi)
- Time zone: UTC+08:00 (China Standard)
- Postal code: 418307
- Area code: 0745

Chinese name
- Simplified Chinese: 地灵乡
- Traditional Chinese: 地靈鄉
Transcriptions
Standard Mandarin
- Hanyu Pinyin: Dìlíng Xiāng

Diling Township (Chinese: 地灵乡) is a township in Huitong County, Hunan, China. As of the 2019 census it had a population of 10,174 and an area of 87.1 square kilometres (33.6 sq mi).

== Administrative division ==
As of 2021, the township is divided into seven villages:

- Diling (地灵村)
- Yaojia (姚家村)
- Dapo (大坡村)
- Jiangbian (江边村)
- Tuanjie (团结村)
- Cengxi (层溪村)
- Qiaochong (桥冲村)

== History ==
During the Republic of China, it was known as Guangping Township (广坪乡).

After the establishment of the Communist State, in 1950, it came under the jurisdiction of the 5th District of Huitong County. In June 1956. Diling Township was set up. Two years later, it was renamed Guangping People's Commune (广坪人民公社) and soon renamed again Diling People's Commune (地灵人民公社) in March 1961. In May 1984 it reverted to its former name of Diling Township.

== Geography ==
The township lies at the southwest of Huitong County, bordering Jingzhou Miao and Dong Autonomous County to the west, Guangping Town to the south, Aoshang Town to the north, and Dabaozi Town to the east.

The highest point in the township is Mount Hunaopo (虎脑坡), which, at 808 metres (2,651 ft) above sea level. The lowest point is Jiangkoutang (江口塘), which, at 208 metres (682 ft) above sea level.

The Diling River (地灵河) flows through the township south to north.

== Economy ==
The principal industries in the area are agriculture and forestry.

== Demographics ==
As of 2019, the National Bureau of Statistics of China estimates the township's population now to be 10174.

Historical population
Year	Pop.	±%
2011	9,871	—
2018	10,093	+2.2%
2019	10,174	+0.8%
