= Changqi, Hongjiang =

Changqi 长碛村
- Village
- Location in Hunan
- Coordinates: 27.2994365°N 110.148534°E
- Country: People's Republic of China
- Province: Hunan
- Sub-provincial city: Huaihua
- County-level city: Hongjiang
- Town: Anjiang (安江镇)

Changqi Village (Chinese: 长碛村; pinyin: Chángqìcūn) is a village in Anjiang (安江镇) (formerly in the southeastern part of Longtian Township (龙田乡)), Hongjiang City, Huaihua, which is located in the western part of Hunan Province, China. As of 2014 it had a population of about 1,400. Most of the villagers share the same surname, Duan, and there is an ancestral shrine specifically for all the people surnamed Duan.

== Agriculture ==
The village is the origin of what eventually became the Qianyang Bingtang orange cultivar (黔阳冰糖橙), which is a famous product of Hongjiang. The predecessor of what was eventually cultivated into today's Qianyang Bingtang orange was discovered in the 1960s by Changqi village resident Duan Tianlong (段天郎).
