= Qiancheng =

Town in Hongjiang, Hunan, China

Coordinates: 27.19395°N 109.81413°E

Qiancheng Town (Chinese: 黔城镇; pinyin: Qiánchéng Zhèn) is a town and the county seat in the middle western Hongjiang City, Hunan, China. The town was reformed through the amalgamation of the townships of Hongyan (Chinese: 红岩乡) and Tuxi (Chinese: 土溪乡), the towns of Shuangxi (Chinese: 双溪镇) and the former Qiancheng, and Ganxiping Village (Chinese: 干溪坪村) of the former Yanlong Township (Chinese: 岩垅乡) on November 25, 2015. It has an area of 335.5 km^{2} (129.5 sq mi) with a population of 93,800 (as of 2015 end), and its seat of local government is at Gucheng Community (Chinese: 古城社区).

== See also ==
- List of township-level divisions of Hunan
