= Hongjiang District =

Hongjiang 洪江管理区
- District
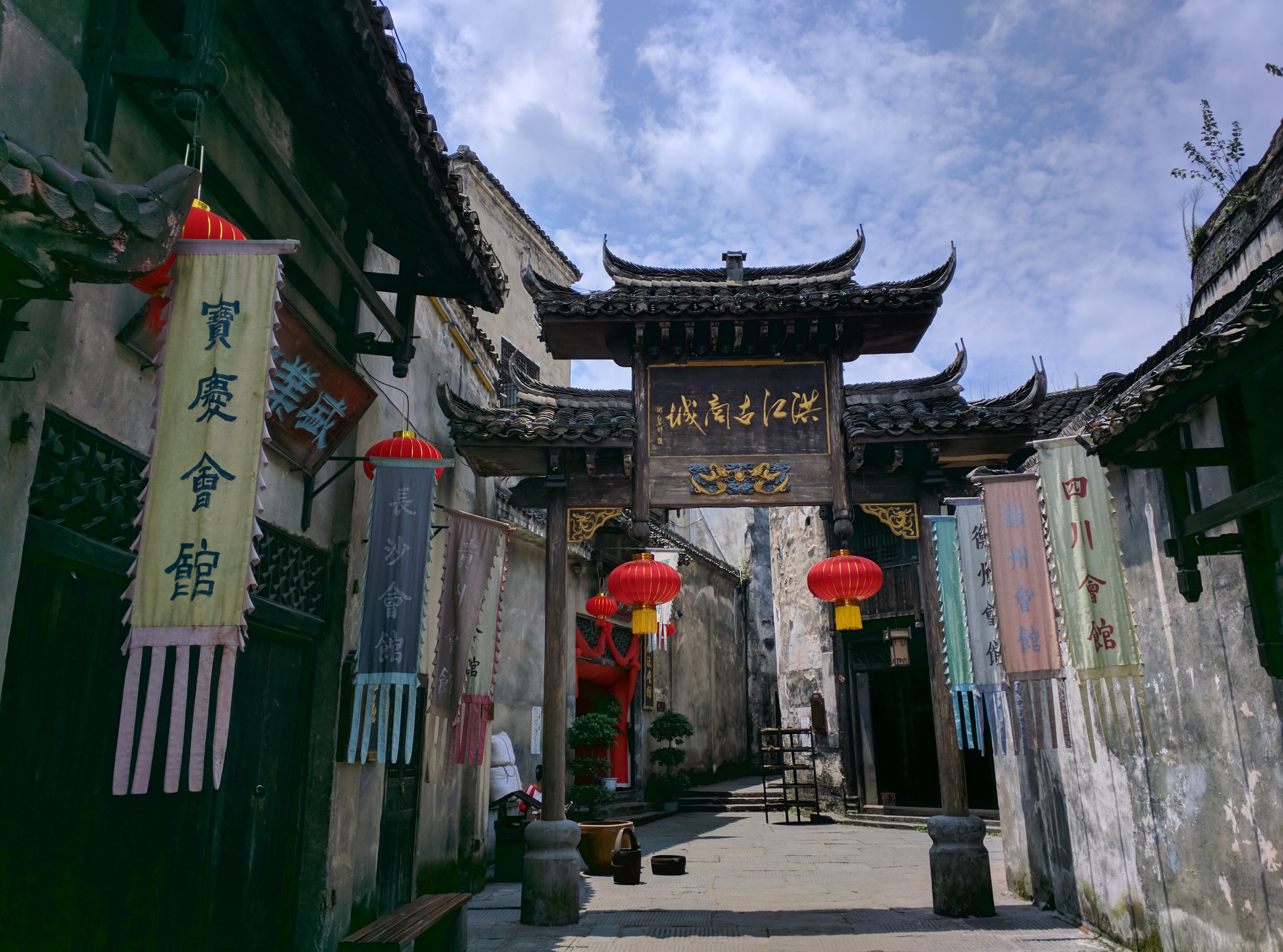
- Gate of Hongjiang Ancient Commercial City

- Location in Hunan
- Coordinates: 27°06′42″N 110°00′41″E
- Country: People's Republic of China
- Province: Hunan
- Prefecture-level city: Huaihua

Area
  - Total: 115.09 km^{2} (44.44 sq mi)

Population (2010)
  - Total: 64,960
  - Density: 564.4/km^{2} (1,462/sq mi)
- Time zone: UTC+8 (China Standard)

Hongjiang Management District (simplified Chinese: 洪江管理区; traditional Chinese: 洪江管理區; pinyin: Hóngjiāng Guǎnlǐ Qū) is a district which is a part of Hongjiang City, Hunan Province, China. It is directly under the administration of the prefecture-level city of Huaihua.

== History ==
The former Hongjiang City was merged with Qianyang County (黔阳县; 黔陽縣) to form the present Hongjiang City in 1997. However, the local residents of the former Hongjiang City strongly resisted this merger. The antagonism and uncertainties were being played out for the first time between the residents and local authorities, and it lasted for some time. The local governments forced to give tacit consent to the status, the former Hongjiang was separated from the new Hongjiang City. As a part of Hongjiang City, the former Hongjiang was reformed as a special management area named Hongjiang District, the Hongjiang District is directly administrated by the government of Huaihua City.
