= Paotuan Dong and Miao Ethnic Township =

Paotuan Dong and Miao Ethnic Township 炮团侗族苗族乡
- Ethnic township
- Location in Hunan
- Coordinates: 26°52′44″N 109°31′49″E
- Country: People's Republic of China
- Province: Hunan
- Prefecture-level city: Huaihua
- County: Huitong County
- Incorporated (township): 1956

Area
  - Total: 79.35 km^{2} (30.64 sq mi)

Population (2019)
  - Total: 13,185
  - Density: 166.2/km^{2} (430.4/sq mi)
- Time zone: UTC+08:00 (China Standard)
- Postal code: 418307
- Area code: 0745

Chinese name
- Simplified Chinese: 炮团侗族苗族乡
- Traditional Chinese: 炮團侗族苗族鄉
Transcriptions
Standard Mandarin
- Hanyu Pinyin: Pàotuán Dòngzú Miáozú Xiāng

Paotuan Dong and Miao Ethnic Township (Chinese: 炮团侗族苗族乡) is an ethnic township in Huitong County, Hunan, China. As of the 2019 census it had a population of 13,185 and an area of 79.35 square kilometres (30.64 sq mi).

== Administrative division ==
As of 2023, the township is divided into eight villages:

- Paotuan (炮团村)
- Zhongxinchang (中心场村)
- Lizhai (梨子寨村)
- Kuaituan (快团村)
- Wangjiapan (王家盘村)
- Yantouping (岩头坪村)
- Yangwantuan (阳湾团村)
- Xintang (新塘村)

== History ==
It belonged to Guangping Township (广坪乡) during the Republic of China.

After the founding of the Communist State, in 1950, it came under the jurisdiction of the 5th District of Huitong County. It was incorporated as a township named "Paotuan Township" in June 1956. In October 1958, it became part of Guangping People's Commune (广坪人民公社). Paotuan People's Commune (炮团人民公社) was split from Guangping People's Commune in March 1961. In May 1984 it reverted to its former name of Paotuan Township. In October 1997 it was named Paotuan Dong and Miao Ethnic Township.

== Geography ==
The township is situated at the west of Huitong County. The township is bordered to the north by Puwen Dong and Miao Ethnic Township, to the east by Qinglang Dong and Miao Ethnic Township, to the south by Guangping Town, and to the west by Tianzhu County.

The highest natural elevation in the township is Tai'an Mountain (太庵山), elevation 701.6 metres (2,302 ft).

There are two major rivers in the township: Qingshui River (清水江) and Guangping River (广坪河).

== Economy ==
The township's economy is based on agricultural resources.

The region has an abundance of gold.

== Demographics ==
The 2019 census reported the town had a population of 13,185.

Historical population
Year	Pop.	±%
2005	12,207	—
2018	13,177	+7.9%
2019	13,185	+0.1%
