= Huitong County =

County in Hunan, China

Huitong County 会同县 Hweitung
- County
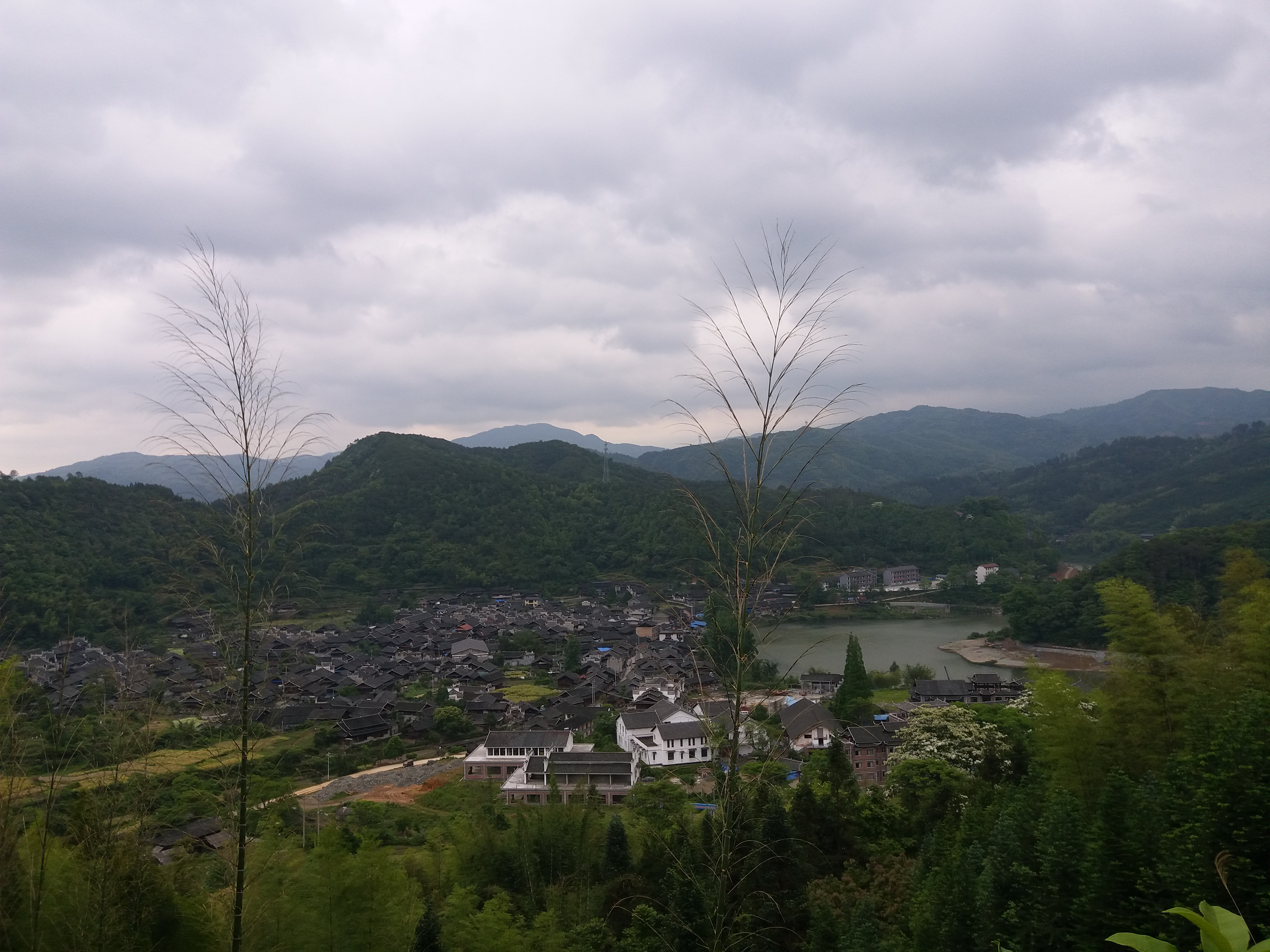

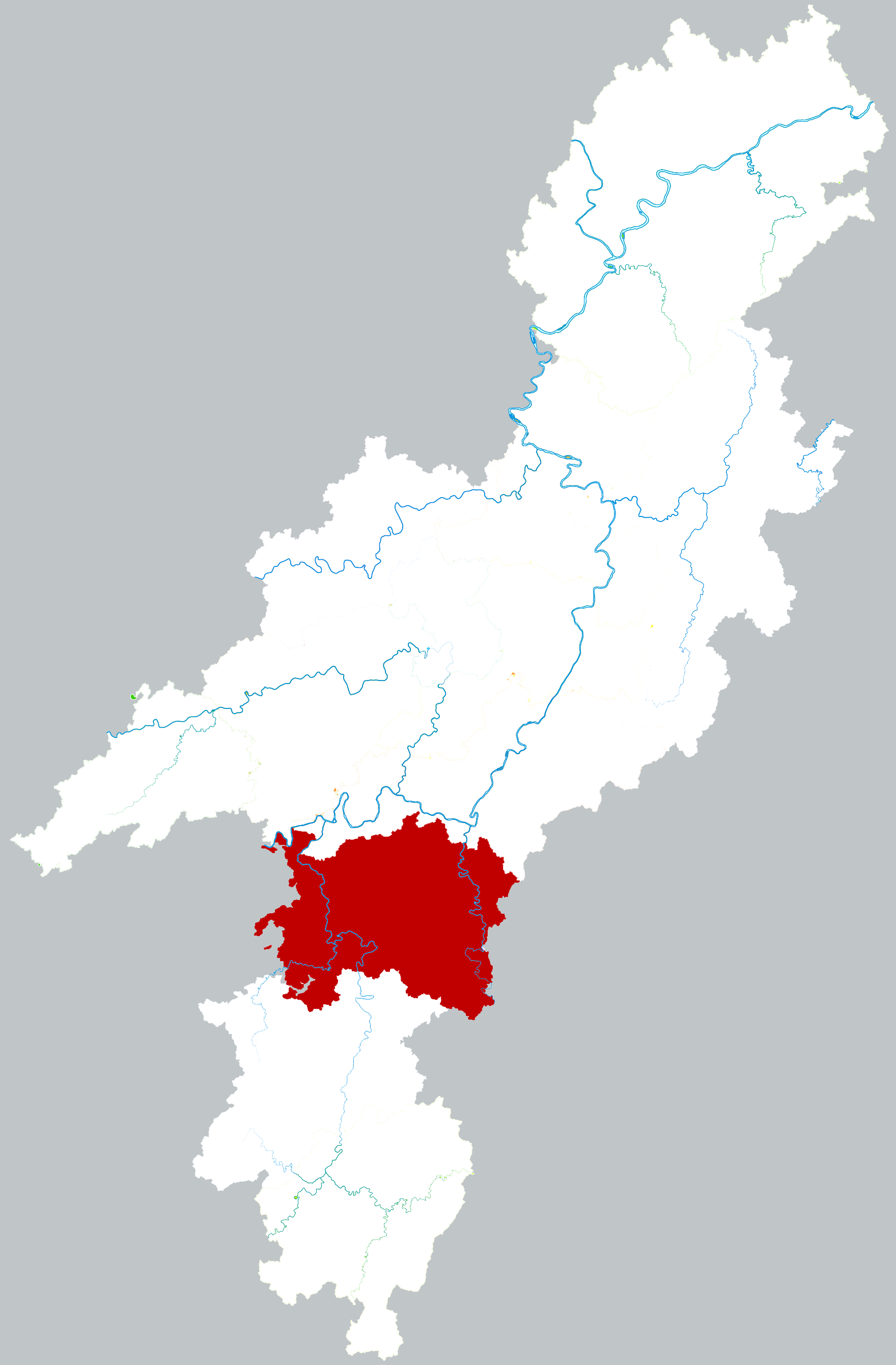
- Location of Huitong County within Huaihua

- Location in Hunan
- Coordinates: 26°52′12″N 109°43′12″E
- Country: People's Republic of China
- Province: Hunan
- Prefecture-level city: Huaihua
- Seat: Lincheng

Area
  - Total: 2,244.46 km^{2} (866.59 sq mi)

Population (2010)
  - Total: 318,686
  - Density: 141.988/km^{2} (367.747/sq mi)
- Time zone: UTC+8 (China Standard)
- Postal code: 4183XX

Huitong County (simplified Chinese: 会同县; traditional Chinese: 會同縣; pinyin: Huìtóng Xiàn) is a county of Hunan Province, China. It is under the administration of Huaihua prefecture-level city.

Huitong County covers 2,258.76 km^{2} (872.11 sq mi). As of 2015, it had a registered population of 365,800 and a resident population of 330,500. Huitong County has eight towns and 10 townships under its jurisdiction, and the government seat is Lincheng (林城镇).

== History ==
The earliest evidence of human settlement in the territory of Huitong County dates back to the Neolithic Age.

During the Xia, Shang and Zhou dynasties (2070 BC–256 BC), it was a part of Jingzhou (荆州).

During the Spring and Autumn period and Warring States period (770 BC–221 BC), it was under the jurisdiction of Chu State (1115 BC–223 BC).

After conquering all the states, Emperor Qin Shi Huang implemented the system of prefectures and counties in 221 BC. Huitong County belonged to Qianzhongjun (黔中郡) and Xiangjun (象郡).

In the Western Han dynasty (206 BC–8 AD), Huitong County was under the jurisdiction of Wulingjun (武陵郡).

In the Three Kingdoms period (220–280), Huitong County was under the rule of Wu State (222–280).

In the Southern dynasties (420–589), it came under the jurisdiction of Tancheng County (镡城县) of Wuyang County (舞阳县).

In 581, Emperor Wen of Sui established the Sui Empire, it was under the jurisdiction of Longbiao County of Yuanlingjun (沅陵郡).

In 634, in the 8th year of Zhenguan period of the Tang dynasty (618–907), Langxi County (朗溪县) split from Huitong County.

In 1102, Sanjiang County (三江县) was set up and renamed "Huitong County" in the following year.

In 1914, Jingzhou was revoked and it came under the jurisdiction of Chenyuandao (辰沅道). From 1936 to 1949, it successively belonged to the 4th Administrative Inspection Area, 7th Administrative Inspection Area, and 10th Administrative Inspection Area.

On 4 October 1949, the People's Liberation Army took control of the county and renamed Huitong Special District (会同专区). The county became a part of Zhijiang Special District (芷江专区) in August 1952, Qianyang Special District (黔阳专区) in December 1952, Qianyang Prefecture (黔阳地区) in 1970, Huaihua Prefecture (怀化地区) in 1981, and Huaihua City (怀化市) in November 1997.

== Administrative divisions ==
As of 2023, Huitong County has 6 ethnic townships, 4 townships and 8 towns under its jurisdiction. The county seat is the town of Lincheng.

Name	Chinese character	Population (2019)	Area (km^{2})	Notes
Buzi	堡子镇	18,116	68.94	
Guangping	广坪镇	22,594	134.03	
Jinzhu	金竹镇	20,450	201.52	
Lincheng	林城镇	83,058	297.89	
Ma'an	马鞍镇	13,404	120.71	
Pingcun	坪村镇	23,090	76.68	
Ruoshui	若水镇	21,350	200.52	
Tuanhe	团河镇	13,929	132.24	
Diling Township	地灵乡	10,174	87.1	
Gaoyi Township	高椅乡	9,220	99	
Lianshan Township	连山乡	15,528	68.09	
Shaxi Township	沙溪乡	15,419	130.15	
Baotian Dong and Miao Ethnic Township	宝田侗族苗族乡	10,008	64.56	
Jinziyan Dong and Miao Ethnic Township	金子岩侗族苗族乡	33,689	243.88	
Mobin Dong and Miao Ethnic Township	漠滨侗族苗族乡	13,786	77.82	
Paotuan Dong and Miao Ethnic Township	炮团侗族苗族乡	13,185	79.35	
Puwen Dong and Miao Ethnic Township	蒲稳侗族苗族乡	10,077	56.58	
Qinglang Dong and Miao Ethnic Township	青朗侗族苗族乡	23,708	118.13	

== Geography ==
Located on the west central margin of the province, Huitong County lies to the east of the border of Guizhou. It is bordered to the north by Zhijiang County and Hongjiang City, to the east and southeast by Suining County, to the south by Jingzhou County, to the west by Tianzhu County of Guizhou.

=== Rivers ===
There are 725 rivers and streams in the county. The Qushui River (渠水河) and Wu River, both are tributaries of the Yuan River, flow through Huitong County south to north.

=== Mountains ===
The highest point in the county is Xuefengjie Mountain (雪峰界) which stands 1,477.4 metres (4,847 ft) above sea level. The Golden Dragon Mountain (金龙山) is the second highest peak within the county, with a height of 1,080.5 metres (3,545 ft).

=== Climate ===
Huitong County is in the central subtropical monsoon humid climate zone, with an average annual temperature of 16 °C (61 °F), total annual rainfall of 1,289.4 millimetres (50.76 in), a frost-free period of 303 days and annual average sunshine hours in 1405.7 hours.

Climate data for Huitong, elevation 281 m (922 ft), (1991–2020 normals, extremes 1991–present)
Month	Jan	Feb	Mar	Apr	May	Jun	Jul	Aug	Sep	Oct	Nov	Dec	Year
Record high °C (°F)	25.5 (77.9)	29.8 (85.6)	31.5 (88.7)	34.7 (94.5)	35.7 (96.3)	37.4 (99.3)	38.5 (101.3)	39.6 (103.3)	38.0 (100.4)	35.6 (96.1)	30.9 (87.6)	25.7 (78.3)	39.6 (103.3)
Mean daily maximum °C (°F)	9.1 (48.4)	12.1 (53.8)	16.3 (61.3)	22.9 (73.2)	27.0 (80.6)	29.8 (85.6)	32.7 (90.9)	32.6 (90.7)	29.1 (84.4)	23.1 (73.6)	17.9 (64.2)	11.9 (53.4)	22.0 (71.7)
Daily mean °C (°F)	5.5 (41.9)	8.0 (46.4)	11.8 (53.2)	17.6 (63.7)	21.8 (71.2)	25.2 (77.4)	27.7 (81.9)	27.0 (80.6)	23.4 (74.1)	18.1 (64.6)	12.8 (55.0)	7.5 (45.5)	17.2 (63.0)
Mean daily minimum °C (°F)	3.3 (37.9)	5.3 (41.5)	8.9 (48.0)	14.1 (57.4)	18.2 (64.8)	22.1 (71.8)	24.0 (75.2)	23.3 (73.9)	19.8 (67.6)	14.9 (58.8)	9.7 (49.5)	4.8 (40.6)	14.0 (57.3)
Record low °C (°F)	−5.0 (23.0)	−3.8 (25.2)	−0.7 (30.7)	2.5 (36.5)	10.1 (50.2)	15.2 (59.4)	18.3 (64.9)	16.8 (62.2)	11.7 (53.1)	3.4 (38.1)	−0.6 (30.9)	−5.2 (22.6)	−5.2 (22.6)
Average precipitation mm (inches)	58.3 (2.30)	64.5 (2.54)	100.5 (3.96)	146.1 (5.75)	202.6 (7.98)	225.1 (8.86)	166.0 (6.54)	122.0 (4.80)	73.6 (2.90)	81.6 (3.21)	62.5 (2.46)	46.6 (1.83)	1,349.4 (53.13)
Average precipitation days (≥ 0.1 mm)	15.0	14.3	18.0	17.1	16.9	15.0	11.1	11.5	9.4	11.0	10.9	10.8	161
Average snowy days	3.8	2.1	0.4	0	0	0	0	0	0	0	0.1	1.3	7.7
Average relative humidity (%)	80	79	80	79	80	80	76	77	77	79	79	77	79
Mean monthly sunshine hours	38.9	49.3	64.2	96.9	119.5	121.9	206.9	197.8	144.5	101.2	86.7	66.4	1,294.2
Percentage possible sunshine	12	15	17	25	29	29	49	49	40	29	27	21	29
Source: China Meteorological Administration

== Demographics ==
As of 2021, the National Bureau of Statistics of China estimates the county's population now to be 365,200, including 193,000 males and 172,200 females, with a sex ratio of 112:100. The birth population is 2,501, with a birth rate of 6.5‰, a death rate of 2,186, a mortality rate of 5.7‰, and a natural population growth rate of 0.8‰.

Historical population
Year	Pop.	±%
1368	11,383	—
1818	100,048	+778.9%
1876	109,987	+9.9%
1921	133,624	+21.5%
1941	187,973	+40.7%
1948	180,205	−4.1%
1953	167,150	−7.2%
1964	191,796	+14.7%
1978	278,762	+45.3%
1982	294,135	+5.5%
1990	321,898	+9.4%
2005	348,055	+8.1%
2021	365,200	+4.9%

=== Language ===
Mandarin is the official language. The local people speak Kam language and Hmongic languages.

=== Religion ===
The Dong and Miao people believe in animism and worship ancestors. Buddhism and Taoism are the two major religions in Huitong County.

== Transportation ==
=== Highway ===
The G65 Baotou–Maoming Expressway, also popularly known as Baomao Expressway, is a north–south highway passing through the east of the county limits.

The China National Highway 209 runs north to south through the west of the county.

The Provincial Highway S342 is a north–south highway passing through the county's downtown, commercial, and industrial districts.

=== Railway ===
The Jiaozuo–Liuzhou railway runs north–south through the downtown county and the Huitong Railway Station serves the county.
