= Wu River (Yuan River, south) =

Tributary of Yuan River in Hunan Province, China

The Wu River (Chinese: 巫水; pinyin: Wū Shuǐ) is a right tributary of the Yuan River in southwestern Hunan Province, south China. It rises in the southern Chengbu Miao Autonomous County. The river runs northward joins Yuan River at Guihuayuan, Hongjiang City. The river has a length of 244 kilometres (152 mi) and drains an area of 4,205 square kilometres (1,624 sq mi).
