= Jinziyan Dong and Miao Ethnic Township =

Jinziyan Dong and Miao Ethnic Township 金子岩侗族苗族乡
- Ethnic township
- Location in Hunan
- Coordinates: 26°43′15″N 109°59′56″E
- Country: People's Republic of China
- Province: Hunan
- Prefecture-level city: Huaihua
- County: Huitong County
- Incorporated (township): 1956

Area
  - Total: 243.88 km^{2} (94.16 sq mi)

Population (2019)
  - Total: 33,689
  - Density: 138.14/km^{2} (357.77/sq mi)
- Time zone: UTC+08:00 (China Standard)
- Postal code: 418315
- Area code: 0745

Chinese name
- Simplified Chinese: 金子岩侗族苗族乡
- Traditional Chinese: 金子岩侗族苗族鄉
Transcriptions
Standard Mandarin
- Hanyu Pinyin: Jīnzǐyán Dòngzú Miáozú Xiāng

Jinziyan Dong and Miao Ethnic Township (Chinese: 金子岩侗族苗族乡) is an ethnic township in Huitong County, Hunan, China. As of the 2019 census it had a population of 33,689 and an area of 243.88 square kilometres (94.16 sq mi).

== Administrative division ==
As of 2023, the township is divided into 26 villages:

- Jinziyan (金子岩村)
- Chenjia (陈家村)
- Shuangjiang (双江村)
- Muli (木力村)
- Pinxi (品溪村)
- Yuanzhen (元贞村)
- Jinyukou (金鱼口村)
- Chaxi (茶溪村)
- Niwan (泥湾村)
- Wangjiaping (王家坪村)
- Xinhua (新华村)
- Congshujiao (枞树脚村)
- Heping (和平村)
- Jiaoniang (交粮村)
- Lixi (利溪村)
- Xiabatang (下坝塘村)
- Changtan (长滩村)
- Pingmo (坪磨村)
- Chongjiaoyang (冲脚羊村)
- Baishi (白市村)
- Baishixikou (白市溪口村)
- Xiaoshi (小市村)
- Chitu (赤土村)
- Xiaohongjiang (小洪江村)
- Santian (三田村)
- Changzhai Lianhe (长寨联合村)

== History ==
The region belonged to Fengshan Township (丰山乡) during the Republic of China.

After the founding of the Communist State, in 1950, it came under the jurisdiction of the 7th District of Huitong County. In June 1955, it was under the jurisdiction of Shaxi District (沙溪区). Jinziyan Township (金子岩乡) was set up in 1956. It was renamed Wangjiaping People's Commune (王家坪人民公社) in October 1958 and renamed again Jinziyan People's Commune (金子岩人民公社) in 1961. In May 1984, it reverted to its former name of Jinziyan Township. It was designated as an ethnic township (金子岩侗族苗族乡) in October 1997. In December 2015, Changzhai Township (长寨乡) and Wangjiaping Township (王家坪乡) were merged into Jinziyan Dong and Miao Ethnic Township.

== Geography ==
Jinziyan Dong and Miao Ethnic Township lies at the southeastern of Huitong County, bordering Shaxi Township to the west, Suining County to the south and east, and Wangjiaping Township to the north.

The highest point in the township is Guanyin Hillside (观音坡), which, at 771.3 metres (2,531 ft) above sea level. The lowest point is Dashazhou (大沙洲; 'Big Sandbar'), which, at 200 metres (660 ft) above sea level.

The Wushui River (巫水河) flows through the eastern township south to north.

== Economy ==
The main industries in and around the township are farming and forestry. The region abounds with iron.

== Demographics ==
As of 2019, the National Bureau of Statistics of China estimates the township's population now to be 33,689.

Historical population
Year	Pop.	±%
2005	12,779	—
2011	13,298	+4.1%
2018	33,857	+154.6%
2019	33,689	−0.5%
