= Lincheng, Huitong County =

Town in Hunan, China

Lincheng 林城镇
- Town
- Location in Hunan
- Coordinates: 26°52′25″N 109°43′01″E
- Country: People's Republic of China
- Province: Hunan
- Prefecture-level city: Huaihua
- County: Huitong County
- Designated (town): 2015

Area
  - Urban: 297.19 km^{2} (114.75 sq mi)

Population (2019)
  - Town: 83,058
- Time zone: UTC+08:00 (China Standard)
- Postal code: 418300
- Area code: 0778

Chinese name
- Simplified Chinese: 林城镇
- Traditional Chinese: 林城鎮
Transcriptions
Standard Mandarin
- Hanyu Pinyin: Línchéng Zhèn

Lincheng Town (Chinese: 林城镇) is a town and the county seat in the south central Huitong County, Hunan, China. It has an area of 297.89 km^{2} (115.02 sq mi) with a population of 83058 (as of 2019 end). Its seat of local government is at Gaihe Community (改河社区).

== Administrative division ==
As of 2021, the town is divided into three communities and 33 villages:

- Gaihe Community (改河社区)
- East Gate Community (东门社区)
- Construction Community (建设社区)
- Xiaozhai (小寨村)
- Longtang (龙塘村)
- Dashiban (大石板村)
- Sakou (洒口村)
- Chaxi (茶溪村)
- Daqiao (大桥村)
- Dutou (渡头村)
- Dachong (大冲村)
- Zaohe (早禾村)
- Wengbao (翁保村)
- Changtian (长田村)
- Dongtou (洞头村)
- Niangxi (酿溪村)
- Zongli (棕李村)
- Buyun (步云村)
- Yantou (岩头村)
- Xiping (溪坪村)
- Dongyue (东岳村)
- Mujiao (墓脚村)
- Luoxi (落溪村)
- Yaofeng (瑶丰村)
- Longpo (龙坡村)
- Saxi (洒溪村)
- Minzhu (民主村)
- Jinzhai (金寨村)
- Shizi (柿子村)
- Paizi (排子村)
- Zongshitang (棕石塘村)
- Yingzuijie (鹰嘴界村)
- Jixiu (吉秀村)
- Wengzhu (翁竹村)
- Zhuzhai (竹寨村)
- Yanbi (岩壁村)

== History ==
The town was reformed through the amalgamation of Jiuxi Township (洒溪乡), Yantou Township (岩头乡) and the former Lincheng Town on November 19, 2015.

== Geography ==
The town lies at the central and southern of Huitong County, bordering Qinglang Dong and Miao Ethnic Township and Guangping Town to the west, Lianshan Township to the south, Pingcun to the north, and Tuanhe Town to the east.

The highest point in the town is Dapotou (大坡头) which stands 640 metres (2,100 ft) above sea level. The lowest point is Hongmentang (红门塘), which, at 260 metres (850 ft) above sea level.

The Qu River flows through the town south to north.

== Economy ==
The local economy is primarily based upon agriculture and local industry.

The region abounds with gold, uranium, and limestone.

== Demographics ==
The 2019 census reported the town had a population of 83,058.

Historical population
| Year | Pop. | ±% |
|---|---|---|
| 2011 | 81,930 | — |
| 2018 | 82,834 | +1.1% |
| 2019 | 83,058 | +0.3% |

== Transport ==
The Jiaozuo–Liuzhou railway passes across the town north to south.

The China National Highway 209 is a north-south highway passing through the town's downtown, commercial, and industrial districts.

The Provincial Highway S343 is a north–south highway in the town.

== Tourist attractions ==
A public park are located in the town: Su Yu Park (粟裕公园), which named after the PLA general Su Yu.

== See also ==
- List of township-level divisions of Hunan
