= Guangping, Huitong County =

Guangping 广坪镇
- Town
- Location in Hunan
- Coordinates: 26°47′09″N 109°37′26″E
- Country: People's Republic of China
- Province: Hunan
- Prefecture-level city: Huaihua
- County: Huitong County
- Designated (town): 1995

Area
  - Total: 134.03 km^{2} (51.75 sq mi)

Population (2019)
  - Total: 22,594
  - Density: 168.57/km^{2} (436.61/sq mi)
- Time zone: UTC+08:00 (China Standard)
- Postal code: 418307
- Area code: 0745

Chinese name
- Simplified Chinese: 广坪镇
- Traditional Chinese: 廣坪鎮
Transcriptions
Standard Mandarin
- Hanyu Pinyin: Guǎngpíng Zhèn

Guangping (Chinese: 广坪镇) is a town in Huitong County, Hunan, China. As of the 2019 census it had a population of 22,594 and an area of 134.03 square kilometres (51.75 sq mi).

== Administrative division ==
As of 2021, the town is divided into one community and twelve villages:

- Linyuan Community (林源社区)
- Tielutou (铁炉头村)
- Jilang (吉朗村)
- Yangjiadu (杨家渡村)
- Guangping (广坪村)
- Longkong (龙孔村)
- Shijia (石家村)
- Suxikou (苏溪口村)
- Xilou (西楼村)
- Yangjiaoping (羊角坪村)
- Haopiping (蒿圮坪村)
- Meshao (么哨村)
- Guangmu (广木村)

== History ==
It was known as Guangping Township during the Republic of China.

After the establishment of the Communist State, in April 1950, it came under the jurisdiction of the 5th District of Huitong County. In May 1955 it was renamed Guangping District (广坪区) and soon reverted to its former name of Guangping Township in June 1956. In October 1958, it was changed to Guangping People's Commune (广坪人民公社) and reverted to Guangping Township in May 1984. In October 1995 it was upgraded to a town.

== Geography ==
The town is located in the southwest of Huitong County. It shares a border with Tianzhu County to the west, Lianshan Township to the east, Lincheng Town, Qinglang Dong and Miao Ethnic Township and Paotuan Dong and Miao Ethnic Township to the north, and Diling Township to the south.

The highest point is Gaolin Mountain (高林山), elevation 860 metres (2,820 ft).

There are two streams in the town: Diling Stream (地灵河) and Yangjiaoping Stream (羊角坪河). The two streams converge at Guangping Village to form Guangping River (广坪河).

== Economy ==
The main industries in and around the town are farming and forestry.

== Demographics ==
As of 2019, the National Bureau of Statistics of China estimates the town's population now to be 22,594.

Historical population
Year	Pop.	±%
2005	20,486	—
2011	21,600	+5.4%
2018	22,287	+3.2%
2019	22,594	+1.4%

== Transportation ==
The Provincial Highway S318 is a northeast–southwest highway in the town.
