= Buzi, Huitong County =

Buzi 堡子镇
- Town
- Etymology: A small town surrounded by earthen walls
- Location in Hunan
- Coordinates: 26°59′10″N 109°46′31″E
- Country: People's Republic of China
- Province: Hunan
- Prefecture-level city: Huaihua
- County: Huitong County
- Incorporated (township): 1984
- Designated (town): 1985

Area
  - Total: 69.84 km^{2} (26.97 sq mi)

Population (2019)
  - Total: 18,116
  - Density: 259.4/km^{2} (671.8/sq mi)
- Time zone: UTC+08:00 (China Standard)
- Postal code: 418303
- Area code: 0745

Chinese name
- Simplified Chinese: 堡子镇
- Traditional Chinese: 堡子鎮
Transcriptions
Standard Mandarin
- Hanyu Pinyin: bǔzǐ Zhèn

Buzi (Chinese: 堡子镇) is a town in Huitong County, Hunan, China. As of the 2019 census it had a population of 18,116 and an area of 69.84 square kilometres (26.97 sq mi).

== Administrative division ==
As of 2021, the town is divided into one community and eleven villages:

- Longyan Community (龙燕社区)
- Buzi (堡子村)
- shangfang (上坊村)
- Xingtang (星塘村)
- Huangqi (黄旗村)
- Xindian (新店村)
- Pingjian (坪见村)
- Chachong (茶冲村)
- Shengxi (胜溪村)
- Zhongxin (中心村)
- Louluo (楼落村)
- Jinshan (金山村)

== History ==
During the Republic of China, it belonged to Anhuai Township (安怀乡).

After the founding of the People's Republic of China, in November 1949, it came under the jurisdiction of the Second District (第二区) of Huitong County. In May 1955, its name was changed to Buzi District (堡子区). In September 1958, it was renamed Pingcun People's Commune (坪村人民公社). In March 1961, Buzi People's Commune (堡子人民公社) split from Pingcun People's Commune (坪村人民公社) and was incorporated as a township named Buzi Township (堡子乡) in May 1984. In April 1985 it was upgraded to a town.

== Geography ==
Buzi is located on the north of Huitong County. It is surrounded by Ma'an Town on the north, Pingcun Town on the west, Jinzhu Town on the east, and Lincheng Town on the south.

The highest point in the town is a mountain named Xuefengzhai (雪峰寨) which stands 799 metres (2,621 ft) above sea level. The lowest point is the banker of Huitong River in Louluo (楼落村会同河岸), which, at 317 metres (1,040 ft) above sea level.

The Huitong River (会同河) flows through the town northeast to southwest.

== Economy ==
The local economy is primarily based upon agriculture and local industry. The town abounds with limestone, gold, iron, and porcelain clay.

== Demographics ==
As of 2019, the National Bureau of Statistics of China estimates the town's population now to be 18,116.

Historical population
| Year | Pop. | ±% |
|---|---|---|
| 2005 | 16,989 | — |
| 2011 | 17,400 | +2.4% |
| 2018 | 18,016 | +3.5% |
| 2019 | 18,116 | +0.6% |

== Transportation ==
The National Highway G209 passes across the town north to south.
