= Hongjiang =

Hongjiang 洪江市 Hungkiang
- County-level city
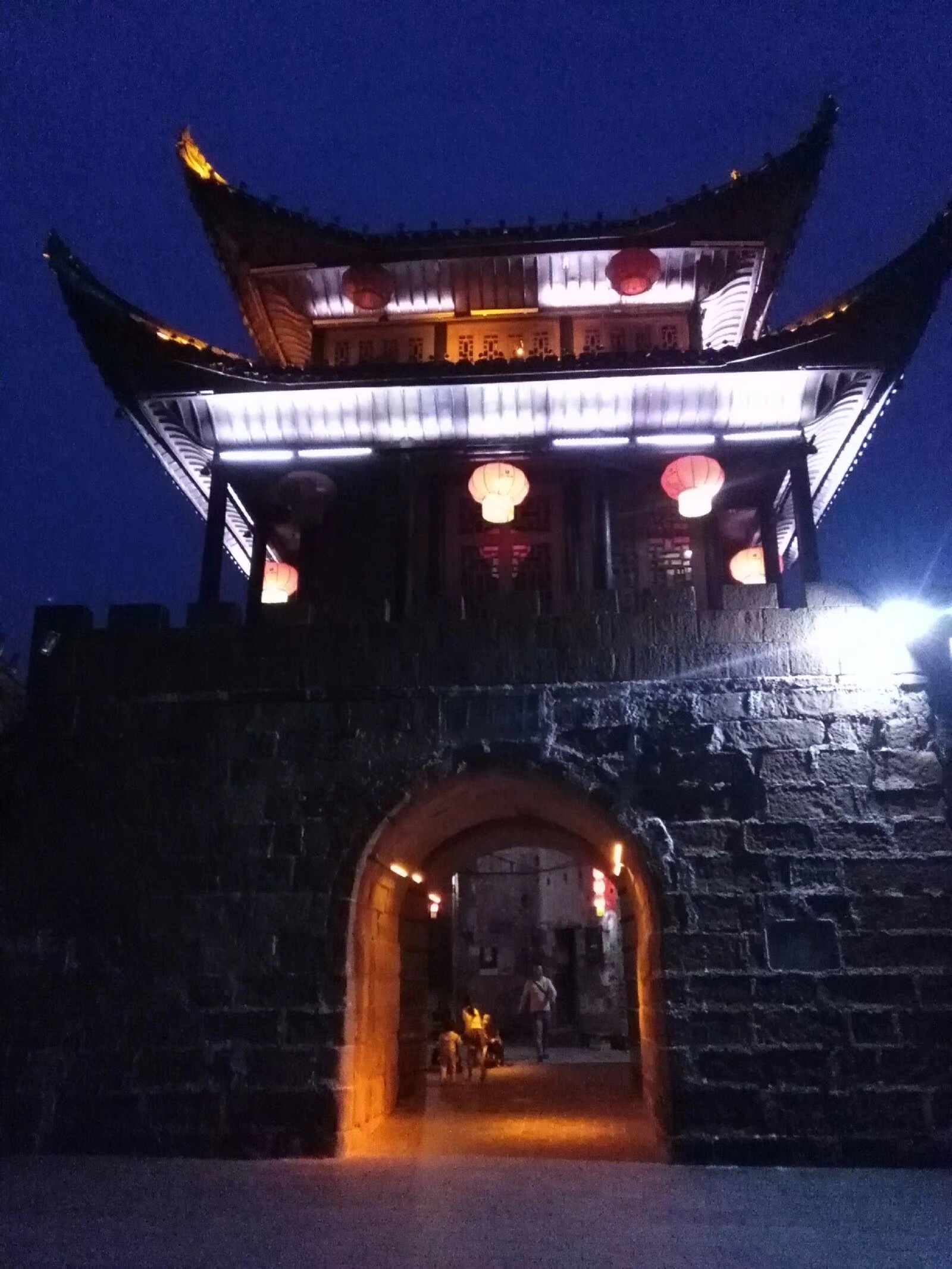
- Gate of the Qianyang ancient city, Hongjiang

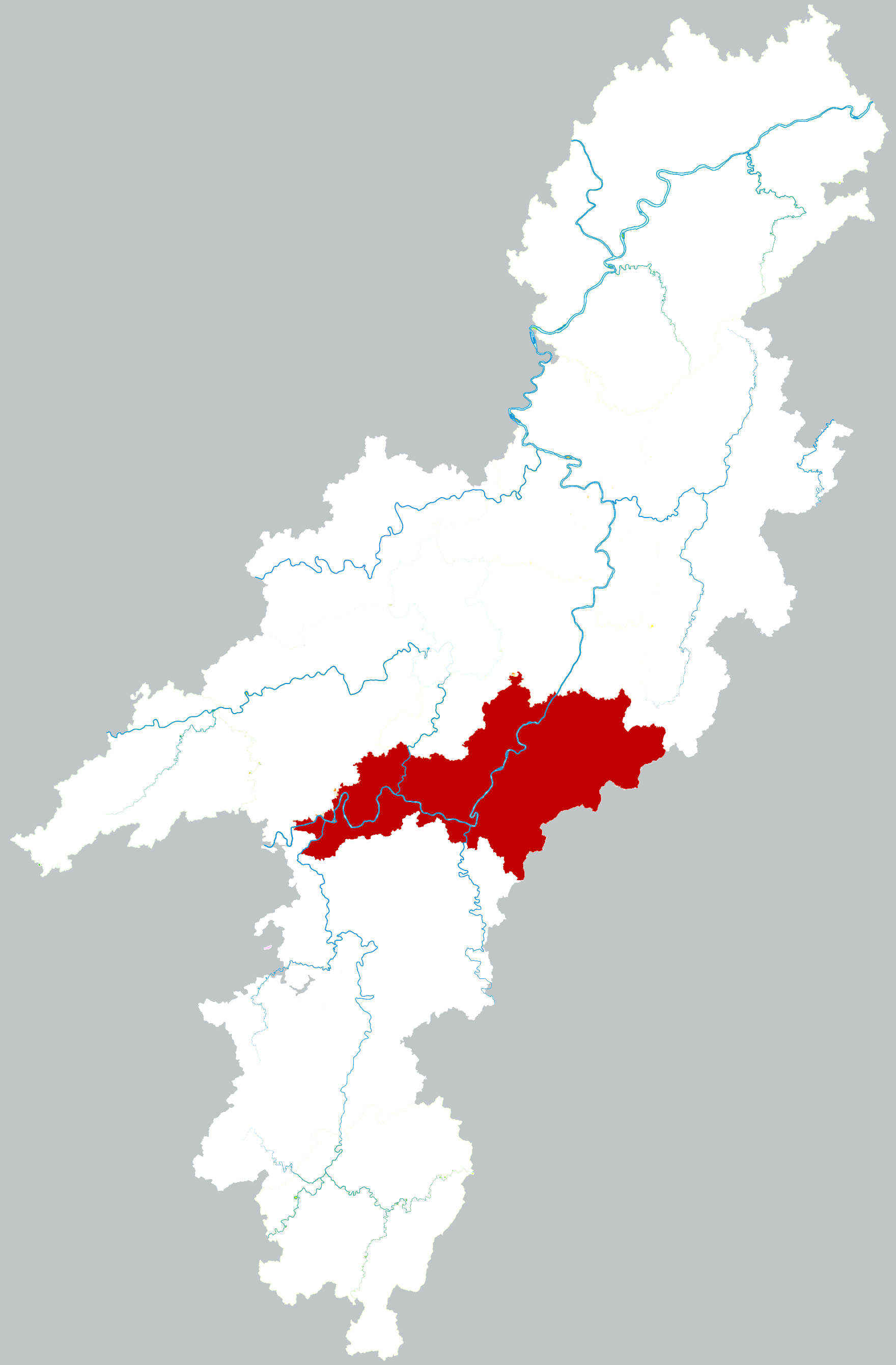
- Location of Hongjiang City within Huaihua

- Location in Hunan
- Coordinates: 27°11′28″N 109°49′08″E
- Country: People's Republic of China
- Province: Hunan
- Prefecture-level city: Huaihua

Area
  - County-level city: 2,164.37 km^{2} (835.67 sq mi)
  - Urban: 14.71 km^{2} (5.68 sq mi)

Population (2010)
  - County-level city: 413,036
  - Estimate (2017): 476,000
  - Density: 190.834/km^{2} (494.259/sq mi)
  - Urban: 69,200
- Time zone: UTC+8 (China Standard)
- Postal code: 4181XX
- Website: hjs.gov.cn

Hongjiang (Chinese: 洪江; pinyin: Hóngjiāng), formerly Qianyang County (simplified Chinese: 黔阳县; traditional Chinese: 黔陽縣; pinyin: Qiányáng Xiàn) is a county-level city in Hunan Province, China. It is under the administration of the prefecture-level city of Huaihua.

Located on the southwest of the province and the south of Huaihua, the city is bordered to the north by Zhongfang County, to the northwest by Zhijiang County, to the south by Huitong County, to the east by Dongkou County. Including the Hongjiang District, Hongjiang covers an area of 2,289 km^{2} (884 sq mi), and as of 2015, it had a registered population of 498,100. The city is divided into 26 township-level divisions, including four subdistricts and two townships of Hongjiang District. The government seat is Qiancheng Town (黔城镇).

== History ==
The former Hongjiang City was merged with Qianyang County (黔阳县; 黔陽縣) to form the present Hongjiang City in 1997. However, the local residents of the former Hongjiang City strongly resisted this merger. The antagonism and uncertainties were being played out for the first time between the residents and local authorities, and it lasted for some time. The authorities forced to give tacit consent to the status, the former Hongjiang was separated from the new Hongjiang City. As a part of Hongjiang City, the former Hongjiang was reformed as a special management area named Hongjiang District, the Hongjiang District is directly administrated by the government of Huaihua City.

== Transportation ==
- China National Highway 209
- Anjiang East railway station on the Huaihua–Shaoyang–Hengyang railway is located here.

== Climate ==
Hongjiang has a humid subtropical climate (Köppen climate classification: Cfa).

Climate data for Hongjiang, elevation 252 m (827 ft), (1991–2020 normals, extremes 1981–present)
Month	Jan	Feb	Mar	Apr	May	Jun	Jul	Aug	Sep	Oct	Nov	Dec	Year
Record high °C (°F)	26.9 (80.4)	31.4 (88.5)	34.7 (94.5)	35.8 (96.4)	36.3 (97.3)	38.0 (100.4)	39.9 (103.8)	40.3 (104.5)	39.4 (102.9)	36.2 (97.2)	31.2 (88.2)	25.4 (77.7)	40.3 (104.5)
Mean daily maximum °C (°F)	9.4 (48.9)	12.5 (54.5)	16.9 (62.4)	23.3 (73.9)	27.5 (81.5)	30.3 (86.5)	33.4 (92.1)	33.4 (92.1)	29.8 (85.6)	23.7 (74.7)	18.3 (64.9)	12.2 (54.0)	22.6 (72.6)
Daily mean °C (°F)	5.6 (42.1)	8.1 (46.6)	11.9 (53.4)	17.7 (63.9)	21.9 (71.4)	25.3 (77.5)	27.9 (82.2)	27.4 (81.3)	23.7 (74.7)	18.3 (64.9)	13.0 (55.4)	7.6 (45.7)	17.4 (63.3)
Mean daily minimum °C (°F)	3.2 (37.8)	5.2 (41.4)	8.8 (47.8)	14.0 (57.2)	18.2 (64.8)	22.0 (71.6)	24.1 (75.4)	23.5 (74.3)	20.0 (68.0)	14.9 (58.8)	9.8 (49.6)	4.8 (40.6)	14.0 (57.3)
Record low °C (°F)	−4.2 (24.4)	−4.4 (24.1)	−1.9 (28.6)	2.3 (36.1)	8.8 (47.8)	13.0 (55.4)	18.2 (64.8)	17.3 (63.1)	12.4 (54.3)	3.3 (37.9)	−0.2 (31.6)	−4.8 (23.4)	−4.8 (23.4)
Average precipitation mm (inches)	63.1 (2.48)	68.6 (2.70)	114.8 (4.52)	150.1 (5.91)	209.7 (8.26)	255.6 (10.06)	165.8 (6.53)	95.8 (3.77)	78.3 (3.08)	85.7 (3.37)	67.9 (2.67)	46.0 (1.81)	1,401.4 (55.16)
Average precipitation days (≥ 0.1 mm)	14.8	14.5	17.9	18.0	17.4	16.3	12.0	11.0	9.2	12.4	11.2	11.4	166.1
Average snowy days	3.8	1.8	0.4	0	0	0	0	0	0	0	0	1.4	7.4
Average relative humidity (%)	81	81	82	82	83	85	80	80	80	82	82	80	82
Mean monthly sunshine hours	40.6	48.9	66.2	91.8	113.8	111.2	194.2	190.1	139.5	100.4	83.3	65.8	1,245.8
Percentage possible sunshine	12	15	18	24	27	27	46	47	38	28	26	20	27
Source: China Meteorological Administration

== See also ==
- Changqi, a village in Anjiang, Hongjiang
