= Huaihua =

Huaihua 怀化市
- Prefecture-level city
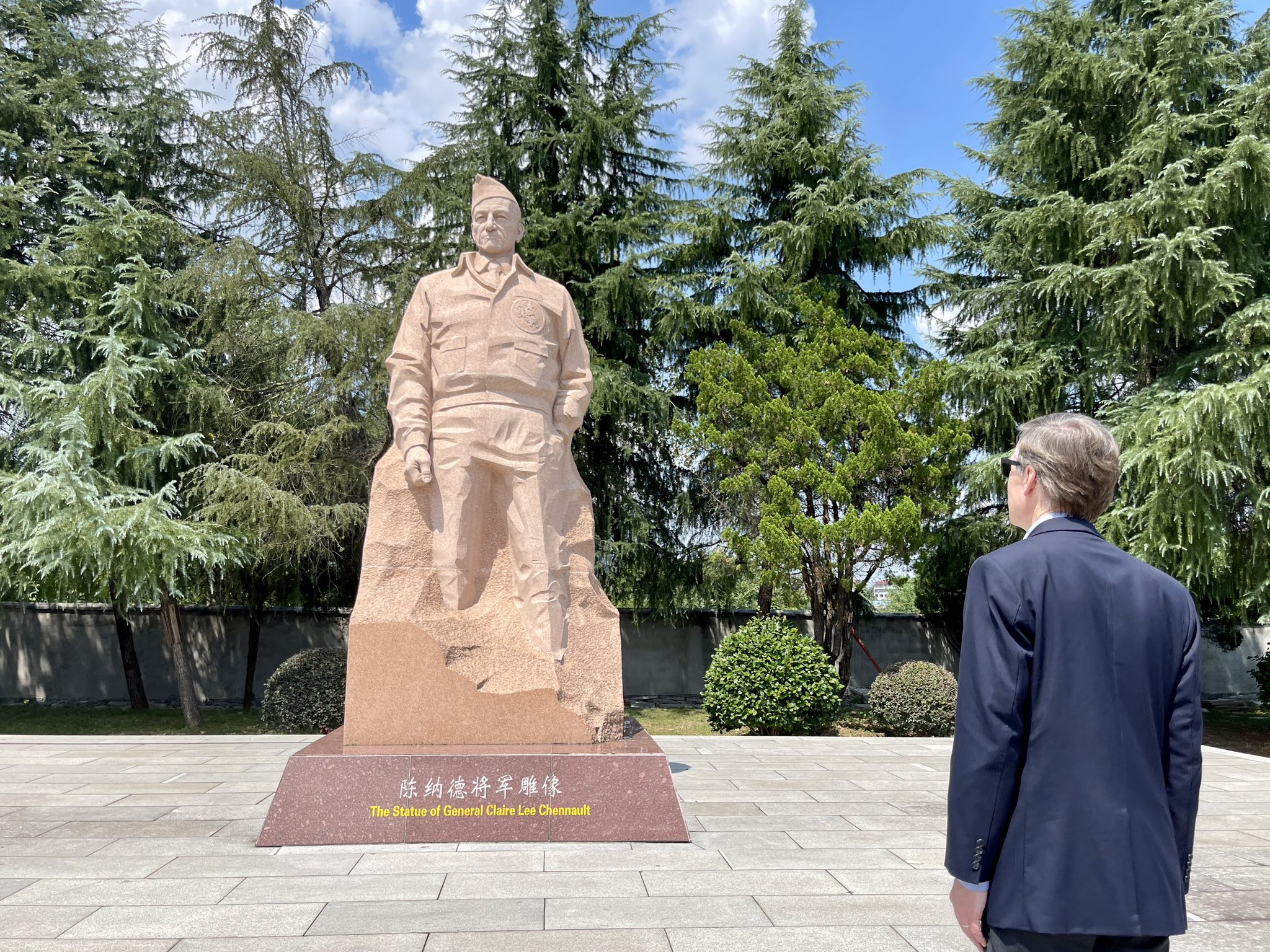
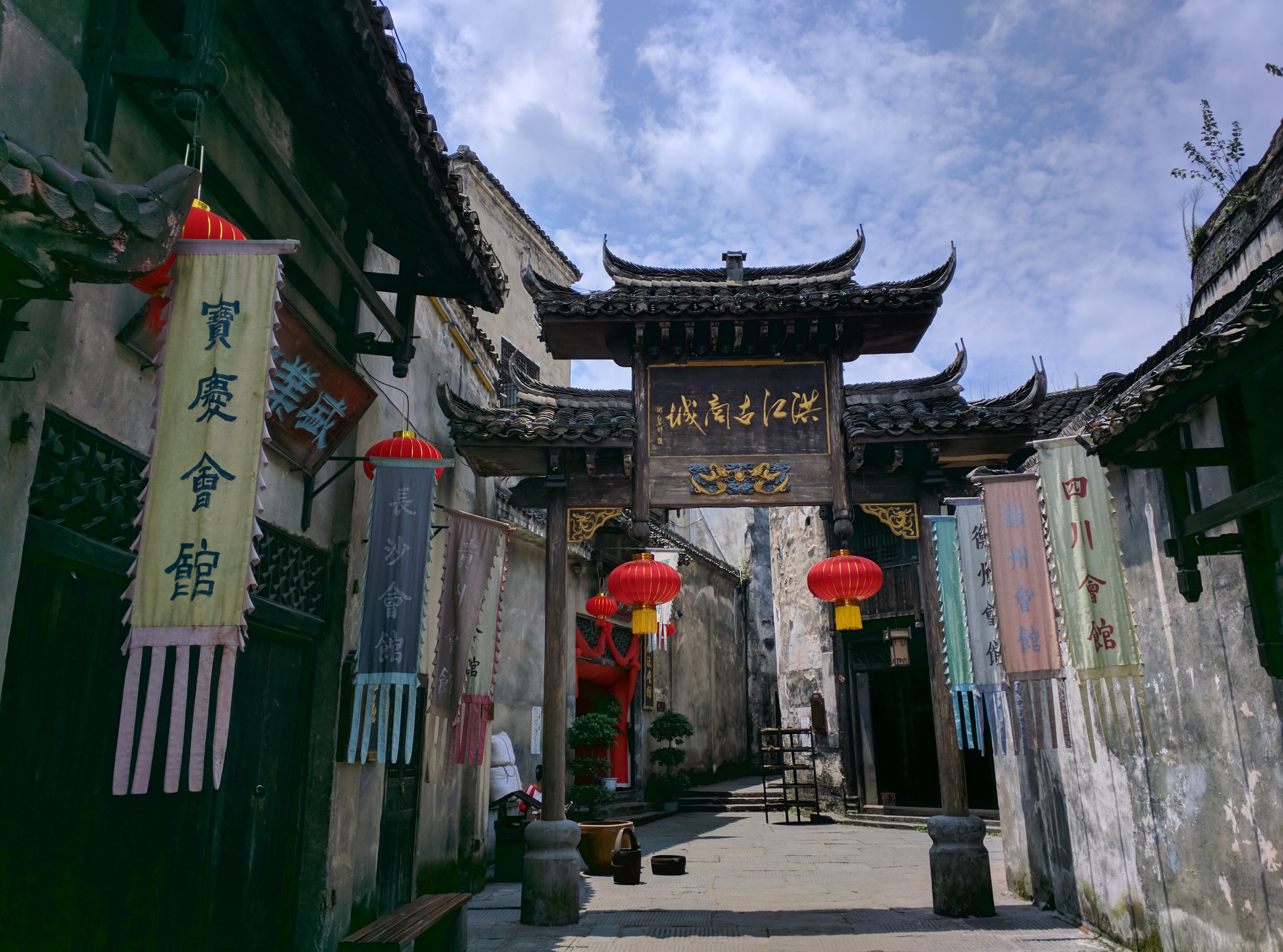
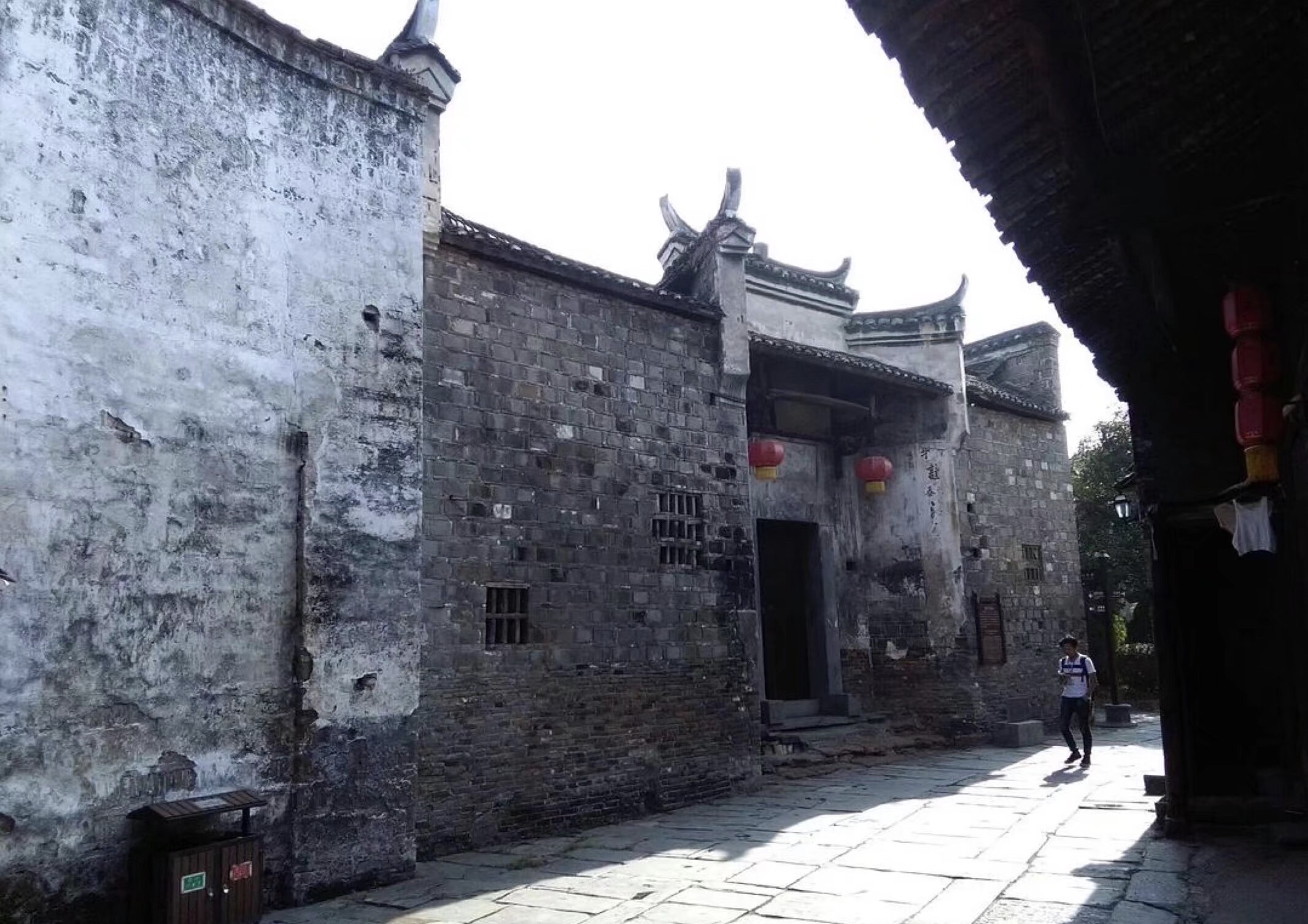
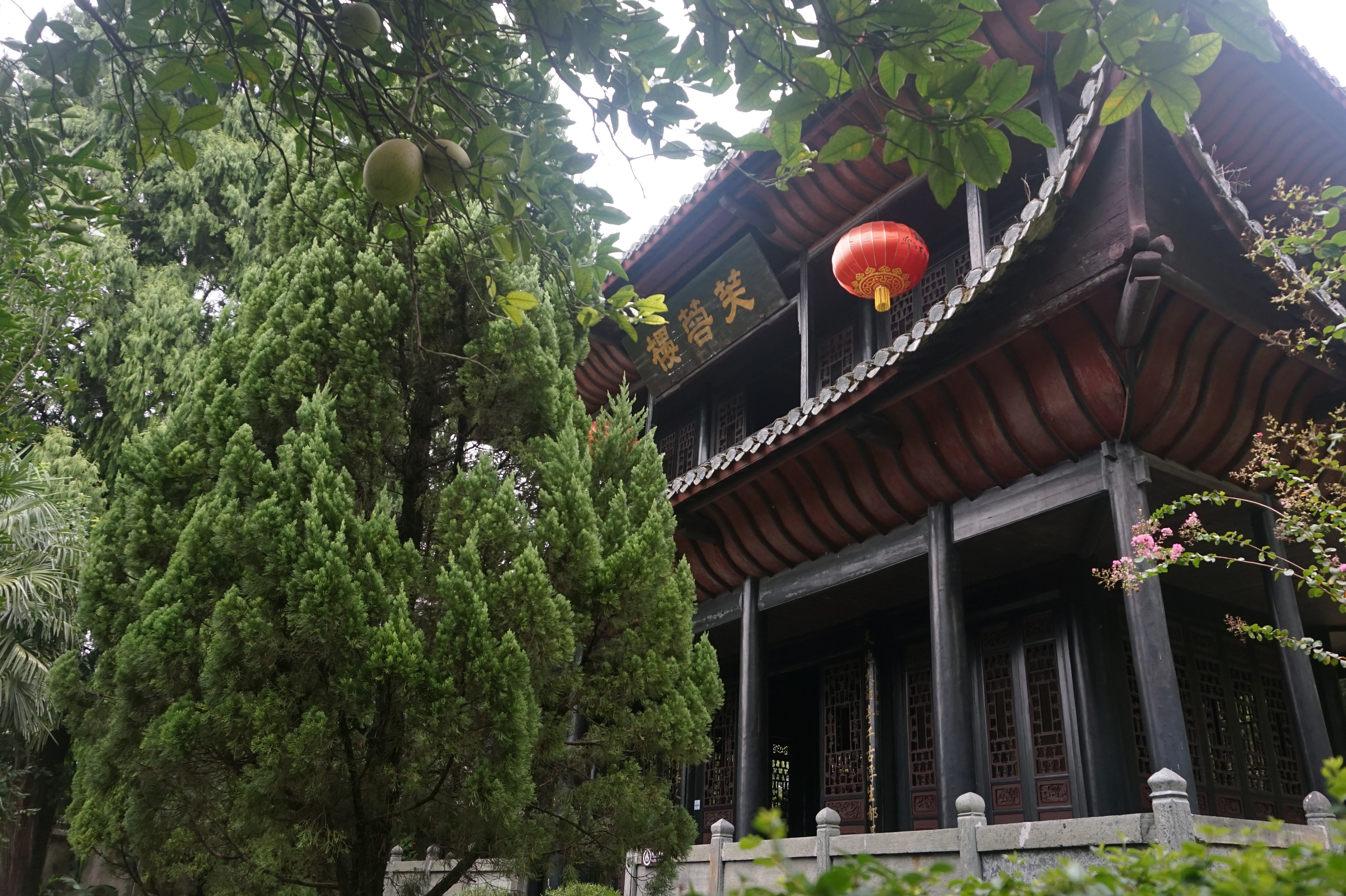
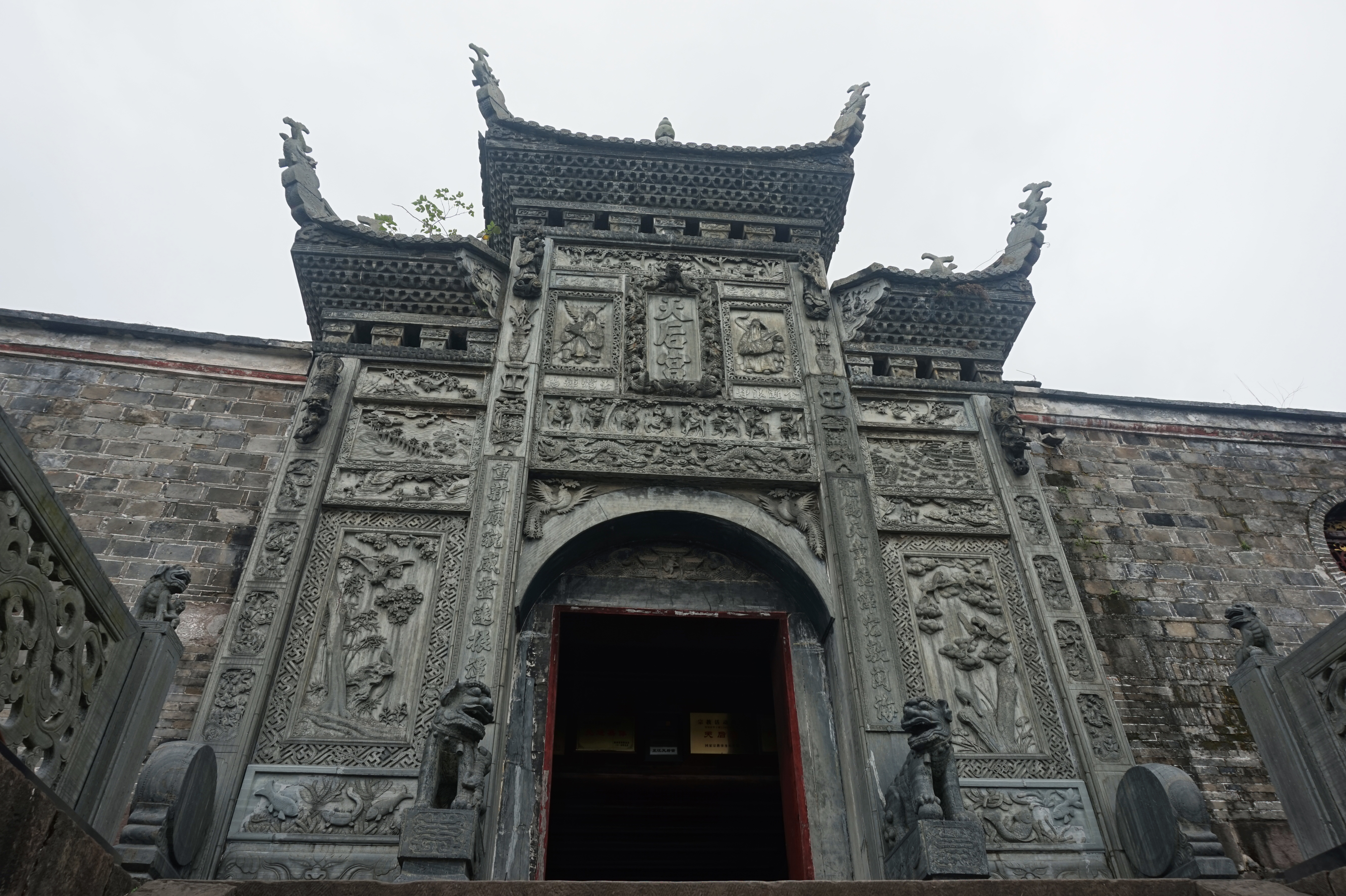
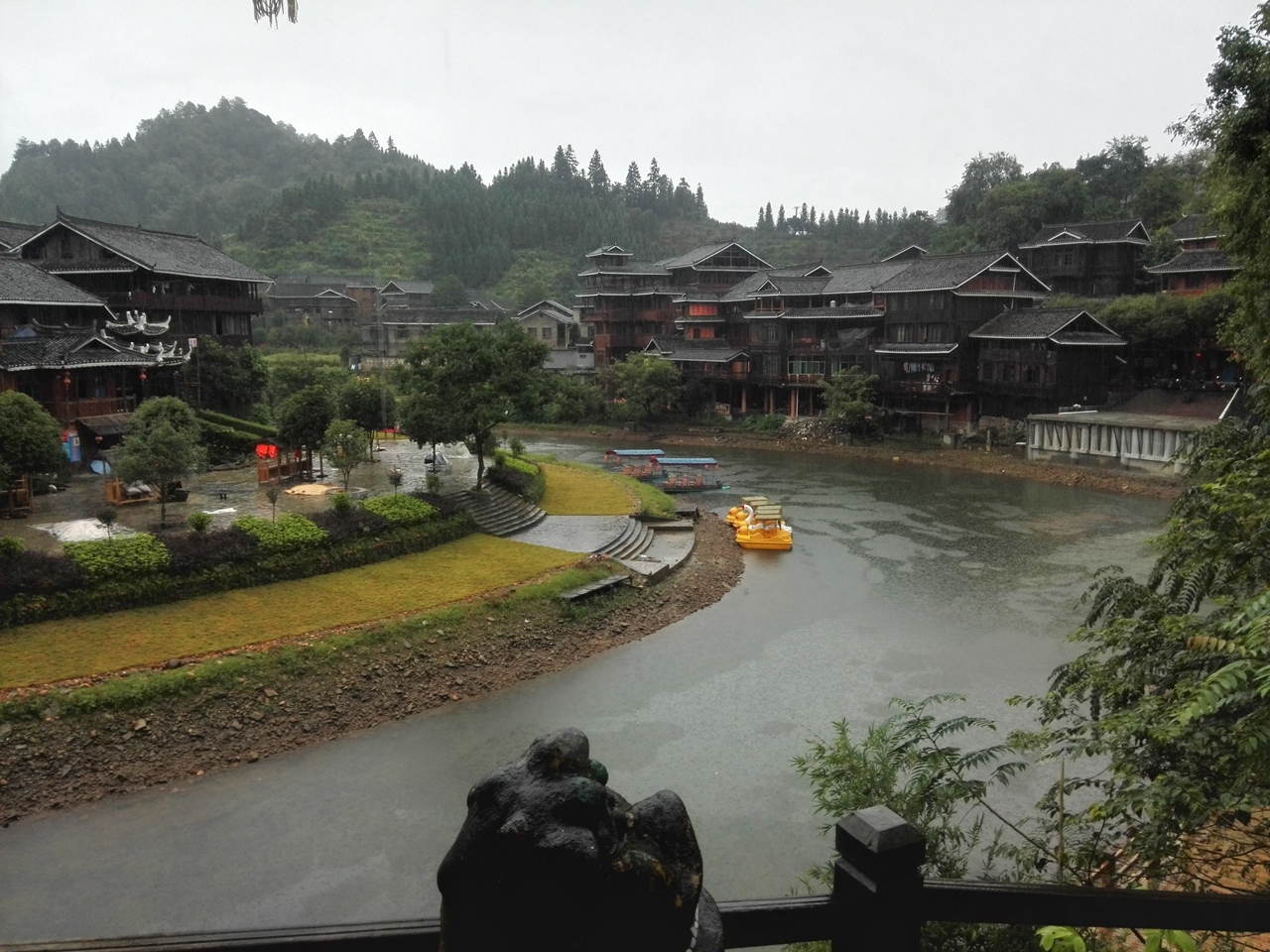
- Statue of Gen. Claire Chennault at the Zhijiang Flying Tigers Museum Hongjiang Ancient Commercial Town Qianyang Ancient Town Furong Tower Zhijiang Mazu Temple Huangdu Dong Village

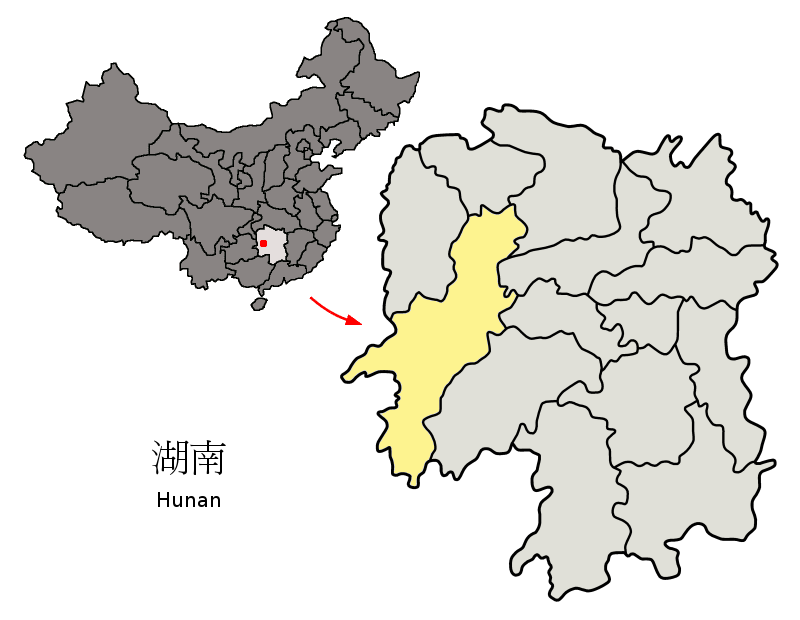
- Location of Huaihua City jurisdiction in Hunan

- Location of the city centre in Hunan
- Coordinates (Yingfeng Park (迎丰公园)): 27°33′39″N 109°59′08″E
- Country: People's Republic of China
- Province: Hunan
- Municipal seat: Hecheng District

Area
  - Prefecture-level city: 27,600 km^{2} (10,700 sq mi)
  - Urban (2017): 64.00 km^{2} (24.71 sq mi)
  - Districts: 722.8 km^{2} (279.1 sq mi)

Population
  - Prefecture-level city: 5,235,200
  - Density: 190/km^{2} (491/sq mi)
  - Urban (2017): 623,800
  - Urban density: 9,747/km^{2} (25,240/sq mi)
  - Districts: 855,000

GDP
  - Prefecture-level city: CN¥ 187.8 billion US$ 27.8 billion
  - Per capita: CN¥ 35,865; US$ 5,333
- Time zone: UTC+8 (China Standard)
- ISO 3166 code: CN-HN-12
- Website: www.huaihua.gov.cn

Huaihua (simplified Chinese: 怀化市; traditional Chinese: 懷化市; pinyin: Huáihuà Shì) is a prefecture-level city in western Hunan province, China. It is known as the "Western Gate" of Hunan and is the largest prefecture-level city by area in the province. It covers 27,564 km^{2} (10,643 sq mi) and is bordered by Xiangxi to the northwest, Zhangjiajie and Changde to the north, Yiyang, Loudi and Shaoyang to the east, Guilin and Liuzhou of Guangxi to the south, and Qiandongnan and Tongren of Guizhou to the southwest. It has a population of 4,741,948 (2010 census), accounting for 7.22% of the provincial population. According to the 2010 Census, 2,909,574 people, or 61.4% of the population, are Han Chinese. Minorities constitute 38.6% of the population, with 1,832,289 people. The Dong, Miao, Tujia, Yao and Bai are major native minority groups. Huaihua is the central region of the Dong ethnic population, home to nearly 28.35% of the Chinese Dong ethnic group.

Huaihua is located in the center of the border area of Hunan, Hubei, Chongqing, Guizhou and Guangxi provinces. It is at the core intersection of a cross on the map of China and is known as the "Gateway to Guizhou and Yunnan" and the "Throat of the Whole Chu".

Huaihua is very mountainous, being located between the Wuyi and Xuefeng mountain ranges. The Yuan river runs from the south to the north. The forest coverage reached 70.8% in 2015.

== Administration ==
- Hecheng District (鹤城区)
- Hongjiang city (洪江市)
  - Hongjiang District (洪江管理区)
- Yuanling County (沅陵县)
- Chenxi County (辰溪县)
- Xupu County (溆浦县)
- Zhongfang County (中方县)
- Huitong County (会同县)
- Mayang Miao Autonomous County (麻阳苗族自治县)
- Xinhuang Dong Autonomous County (新晃侗族自治县)
- Zhijiang Dong Autonomous County (芷江侗族自治县)
- Jingzhou Miao and Dong Autonomous County (靖州苗族侗族自治县)
- Tongdao Dong Autonomous County (通道侗族自治县)

Map
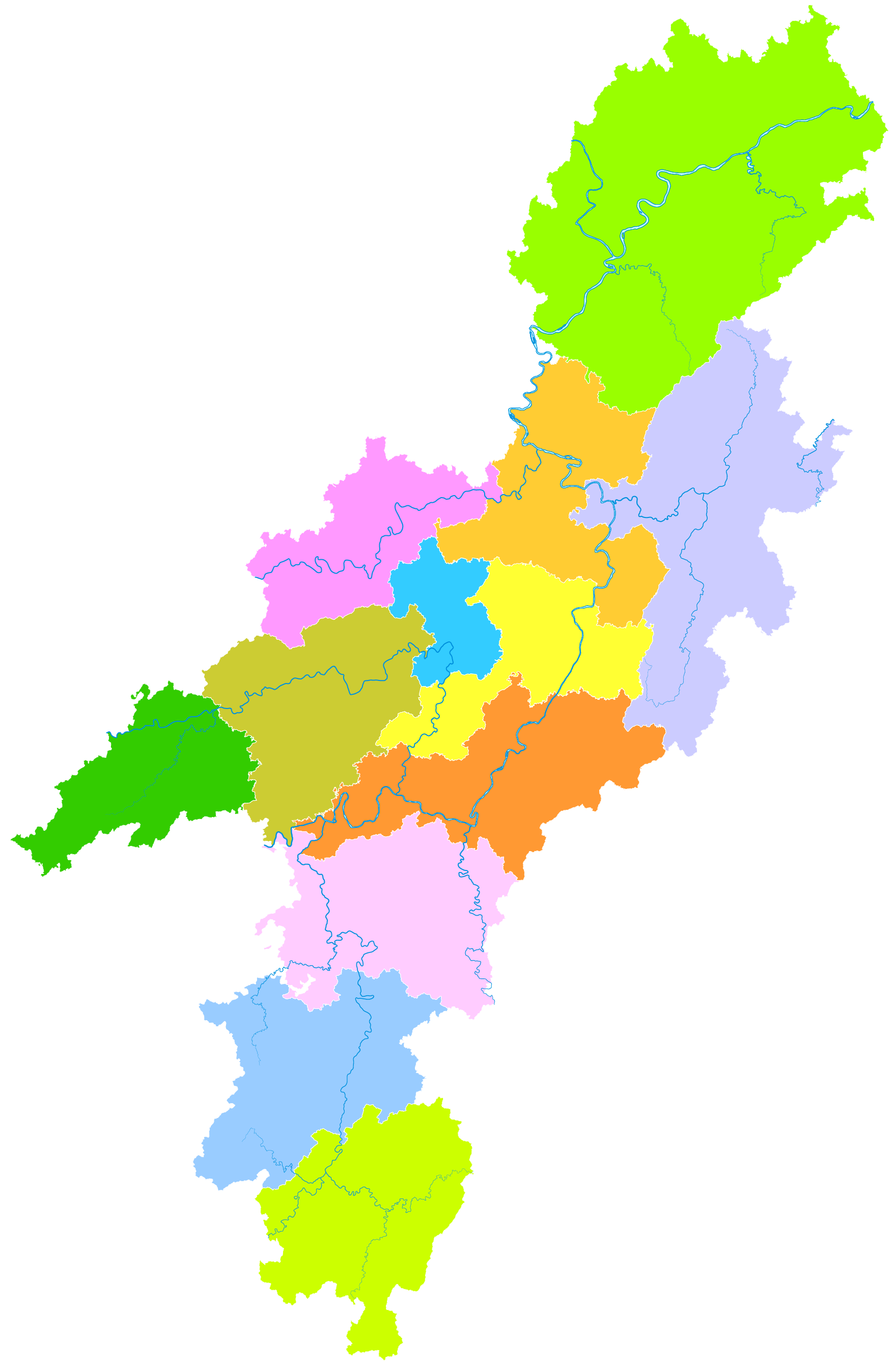

== Geography and economy ==
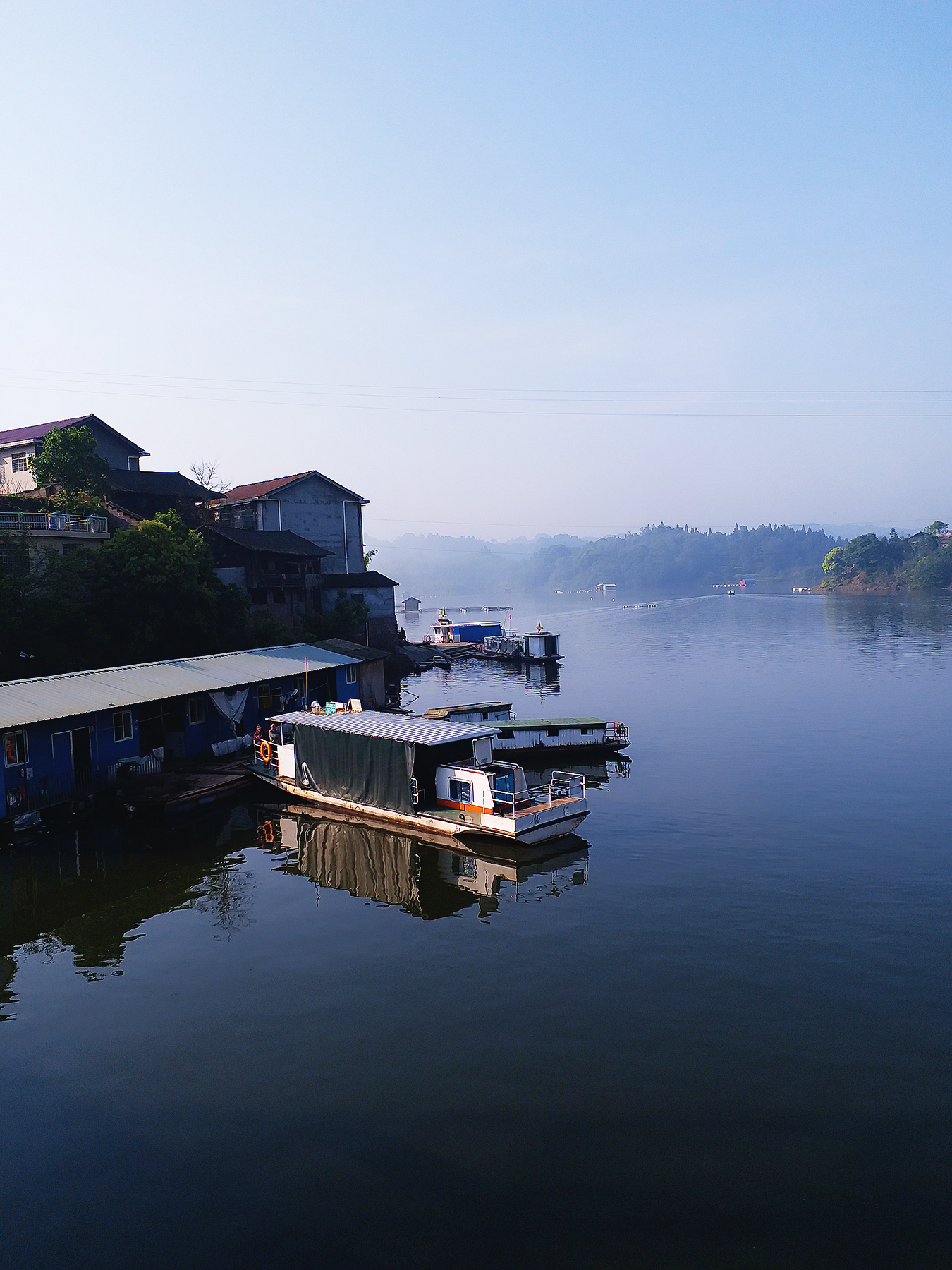
Yuan River in Yuanling County

Huaihua lies in the mountainous west of Hunan, south-east of Zhangjiajie National Forest Park, and shares the same mountain belt. Railroads are major means of transportation in the region, and an airport was opened in 2004.

Huaihua is home to the Second Artillery Corps Base 55, which is charged with maintaining ICBMs. The nuclear assets at Huaihua are intended for small-scale nuclear conflicts (with a limited, but nuclear, exchange), as well as the ability to strike Guam, one of only two B-2 bases.

=== Climate ===
Huaihua City is located in the southwest of Hunan Province, between the Xuefeng Mountain Range and the Wuling Mountain Range. It is mainly mountainous, with many mountains in the east and west and valley plains and hilly areas in the middle. It has a mid-subtropical humid monsoon climate, with a mild climate without long hot days in summer and long frost in winter. Huaihua has long, hot, oppressive, wet and mostly cloudy summers and short, very cold and partly cloudy winters. Temperatures typically range from 1 °C to 32 °C over the course of the year, rarely falling below -3 °C or rising above 34 °C. The annual average temperature is 16.8 °C, the average temperature in January is 4.4 °C, and the average temperature in July is 28.5 °C. The annual average precipitation is about 1,600 mm.

Climate data for Huaihua, elevation 260 m (850 ft), (1991–2020 normals, extremes 1953–present)
Month	Jan	Feb	Mar	Apr	May	Jun	Jul	Aug	Sep	Oct	Nov	Dec	Year
Record high °C (°F)	24.7 (76.5)	28.9 (84.0)	34.2 (93.6)	34.9 (94.8)	36.2 (97.2)	37.1 (98.8)	39.6 (103.3)	39.6 (103.3)	37.7 (99.9)	35.9 (96.6)	30.8 (87.4)	23.2 (73.8)	39.6 (103.3)
Mean daily maximum °C (°F)	8.1 (46.6)	11.4 (52.5)	16.5 (61.7)	22.8 (73.0)	26.7 (80.1)	29.8 (85.6)	33.2 (91.8)	33.1 (91.6)	28.9 (84.0)	22.8 (73.0)	17.0 (62.6)	10.9 (51.6)	21.8 (71.2)
Daily mean °C (°F)	4.9 (40.8)	7.5 (45.5)	12.0 (53.6)	17.7 (63.9)	21.9 (71.4)	25.4 (77.7)	28.6 (83.5)	27.8 (82.0)	23.8 (74.8)	18.2 (64.8)	12.7 (54.9)	7.1 (44.8)	17.3 (63.1)
Mean daily minimum °C (°F)	2.8 (37.0)	4.9 (40.8)	8.9 (48.0)	14.1 (57.4)	18.4 (65.1)	22.2 (72.0)	25.0 (77.0)	24.1 (75.4)	20.3 (68.5)	15.1 (59.2)	9.9 (49.8)	4.5 (40.1)	14.2 (57.5)
Record low °C (°F)	−10.7 (12.7)	−4.0 (24.8)	−1.2 (29.8)	4.0 (39.2)	10.8 (51.4)	16.3 (61.3)	18.2 (64.8)	16.8 (62.2)	11.6 (52.9)	5.9 (42.6)	0.2 (32.4)	−3.5 (25.7)	−10.7 (12.7)
Average precipitation mm (inches)	66.4 (2.61)	74.3 (2.93)	113.0 (4.45)	129.1 (5.08)	217.4 (8.56)	268.8 (10.58)	164.3 (6.47)	100.5 (3.96)	94.5 (3.72)	74.7 (2.94)	80.6 (3.17)	47.8 (1.88)	1,431.4 (56.35)
Average precipitation days (≥ 0.1 mm)	13.7	14.6	17.2	16.3	16.7	14.7	10.8	10.3	9.5	11.4	12.3	11.6	159.1
Average snowy days	4.3	2.3	0.7	0	0	0	0	0	0	0	0.1	1.3	8.7
Mean monthly sunshine hours	46.1	51.9	76.2	104.2	117.9	123.0	210.5	202.4	135.7	104.1	84.6	70.3	1,326.9
Percentage possible sunshine	14	16	20	27	28	30	50	50	37	30	26	22	29
Source: China Meteorological Administrationall-time extreme temperatures

== Government ==
The current CPC Party Secretary of Huaihua is Peng Guofu and the current mayor is Lei Shaoye.

== Transportation ==
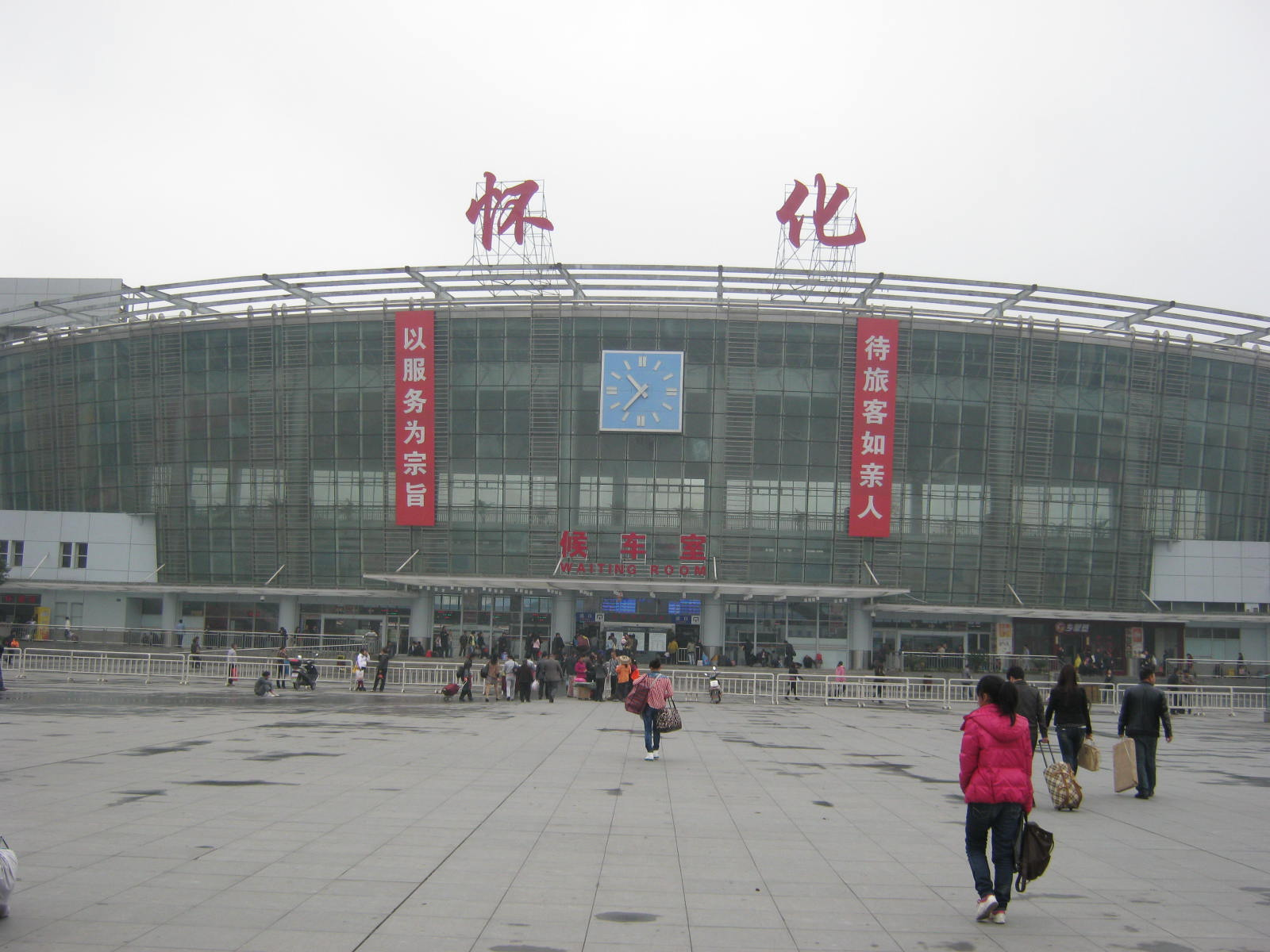
Huaihua railway station

Huaihua is located at a major railway node and its economy has historically benefited from the concentration of railways meeting in the city. Five major railways, the Shanghai–Kunming railway, the Shanghai–Kunming high-speed railway, the Jiaozuo–Liuzhou railway, the Chongqing–Huaihua railway, and the Zhangjiajie–Huaihua high-speed railway intersect in the city. Through these railways Huaihua has connections to almost all major Chinese cities. Passenger trains are served by the Huaihua railway station. Huaihua South railway station meanwhile is served by high-speed trains.

A rail freight handling station, Huaihua West, was opened on 31 January 2021.

Huaihua is on the route of G65 Baotou-Maoming Expressway, which connects it with Chongqing to the northwest. It is also on the route of G60 Shanghai–Kunming Expressway, which connects it with Guiyang to the west, and Changsha to the east. Other roads that run through the city include China National Highway 209 and China National Highway 320.

By air, Huaihua is served by Huaihua Zhijiang Airport, located some 31 kilometers from the city proper in the Zhijiang Dong Autonomous County. By 2025, Huaihua Zhijiang Airport is expected to handle a passenger throughput of 1.1 million.

== Notable people ==
- Cai Xukun, singer-songwriter, dancer and actor
- Cheng Yi, actor and singer
- Jackson Yee, actor, singer, and dancer
- Shu Junrong, slalom canoeist
- Su Yu, military commander and politician
- Xia Da, manhua artist
- Xiang Jingyu, feminist politician
- Zhou Fohai, politician; collaborationist with Imperial Japan
- Nancy Xu, (Xu YouJie) dancer and choreographer on Strictly Come Dancing
