= He Yingqin =

Chinese general and politician

Ho Ying-chin OBSWS KCB
- 何應欽
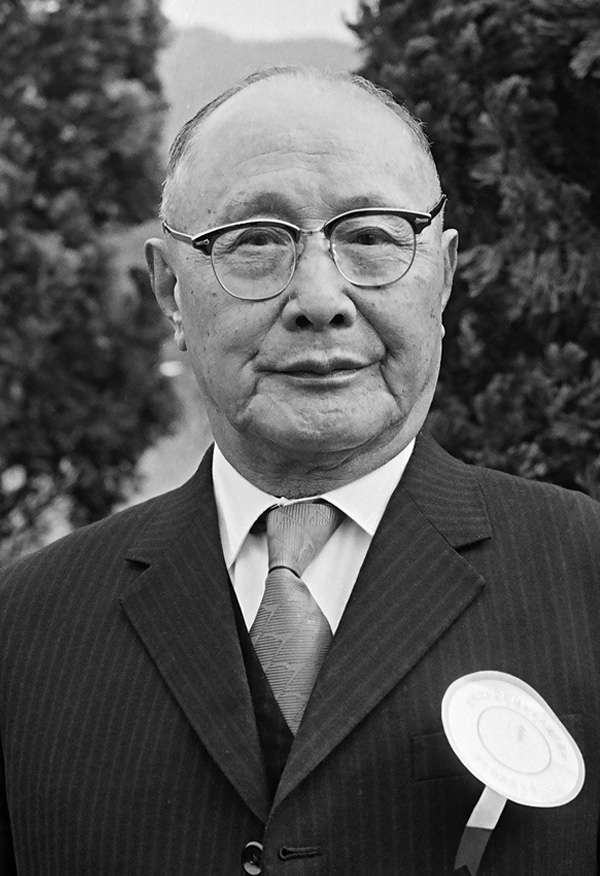

Premier of China
- In office 12 March 1949 – 6 June 1949
- President: Li Zongren (acting)
- Preceded by: Sun Fo
- Succeeded by: Yan Xishan

Minister of National Defense
- In office 3 June 1948 – 21 December 1948
- Premier: Weng Wenhao; Sun Fo
- Preceded by: Bai Chongxi
- Succeeded by: Xu Yongchang
- In office 1 May 1949 – 11 June 1949
- Premier: Himself; Yan Xishan
- Preceded by: Xu Yongchang
- Succeeded by: Yan Xishan

Personal details
- Born: April 2, 1890 Xingyi, Guizhou, China
- Died: October 21, 1987 (aged 97) Taipei, Taiwan
- Education: Tokyo Shimbu Gakko, Imperial Japanese Army Academy
- Occupation: Historian
- Nickname: "Lucky General"

Military service
- Allegiance: Republic of China
- Branch/service: New Army; National Revolutionary Army
- Years of service: 1908–1987
- Rank: General
- Unit: First Regiment, Whampoa Military Academy
- Commands: Chief of the General Staff, National Military Council, Commander-in-Chief, Chinese Army, National Defense Minister
- Battles/wars: Xinhai Revolution Northern Expedition Encirclement Campaigns Second World War: Operation 5; Battle of West Hunan; Chinese Civil War

He Yingqin (traditional Chinese: 何應欽; simplified Chinese: 何应钦; pinyin: Hé Yìngqīn; Wade–Giles: Ho² Ying⁴-ch‘in¹; April 2, 1890 – October 21, 1987) also Ho Ying-chin, was a Chinese politician and one of the most senior generals of the Kuomintang (KMT) during Nationalist China, and a close ally of Chiang Kai-shek. A graduate of the Imperial Japanese Army Academy and an early leader at the Whampoa Military Academy, he served as Chief of Staff, Minister of War (1930–1944), and Commander-in-Chief of the Chinese Army during World War II. He formally accepted Japan’s surrender in Nanjing in 1945 and briefly served as Premier of the Republic of China in 1949 before retreating with the Nationlist government to Taiwan, where he served as a senior presidential advisor until his death.

== Early life and education ==
He Yingqin was born on 2 April 1890 in Nidang village, Xingyi County, Guizhou (now Xingyi, the seat of Qianxinan Buyei and Miao Autonomous Prefecture), Guizhou into a landowning family. His family's ancestral home was in Linchuan, in the prefecture of Fuzhou, Jiangxi. His father, He Qimin, was a merchant, and He was the third of five brothers.

He entered a village school at the age of seven, a local primary school at ten and the county higher primary school at thirteen. He then came first in the entrance examination for the Guizhou Army Primary School in Guiyang. In the spring of 1909, he was sent to the Army Middle School in Wuchang, where his classmates included Gu Zhenglun. That autumn, the two were among twenty students selected by the Minister of War, Tieliang, to study in Japan. He entered the 11th class of the Shinbu Gakkō, a preparatory school for Chinese military cadets, and joined the Tongmenghui.

When the Xinhai Revolution broke out in 1911, He and other Shinbu Gakkō students returned to China. He served on the training staff of the Shanghai military government under Chen Qimei, and then as a company commander and later battalion commander in the 7th Division of the Jiangsu Army. In 1912, he went back to Japan to complete his studies. After finishing at the Shinbu Gakkō, he served an attachment with the Imperial Japanese Army's 59th Infantry Regiment at Utsunomiya, and in the autumn of 1913, he entered the infantry course of the 28th class of the Imperial Japanese Army Academy. He graduated in 1916.

== Guizhou (1916–1921) ==
On his return to Guizhou in 1916, He was recruited by Wang Wenhua, commander of the Guizhou Army, who was looking for trained officers for his new 1st Division. Wang gave him command of the division's 4th Infantry Regiment and of the student battalion of the Guizhou Military Academy, and put him in charge of establishing the academy and training new troops. In July 1916, He became the academy's principal.

In November 1916, Wang Wenhua led the Guizhou Army into Sichuan against Liu Cunhou. He, now commanding the 5th Regiment, marched against Wu Guangxin, the Beiyang government's commander on the upper Yangtze. In December, he defeated Wu's forces at Huangjueya and forced them out of Chongqing. When Wang expanded the Guizhou Army into five mixed brigades after the campaign, He became commander of the 5th Mixed Brigade, which was stationed on the Hunan–Guizhou border. He also served as head of the provincial police.

In 1919, He founded the Young Guizhou Society, modelled on Giuseppe Mazzini's Young Italy, and became its president. The society, which was aligned with the Kuomintang, soon had branches in all 81 counties of the province and published its own daily newspaper. It helped Wang Wenhua to unite reformers in and outside the province against the older faction led by the provincial governor, Liu Xianshi, and it won He Wang's trust.

Wang Wenhua, who had moved to Shanghai to avoid suspicion that he was plotting against his uncle, Liu Xianshi, was assassinated there. Lu Tao became acting commander of the Guizhou Army, with He as acting chief of staff. He tried to rebuild the reformist government with his brother-in-law, Wang Boqun, but Gu Zhenglun marched on Guiyang and ordered him to leave the province. He handed over his command and went to Kunming with a single company, where he joined the Yunnan governor, Gu Pinzhen. By late 1921, he had left Guizhou for good.

== Whampoa and the Eastern Expeditions (1922–1926) ==
In 1922, He was shot twice in Kunming by gunmen hired by Liu Dunwu, a member of Guizhou's conservative faction, and was seriously wounded in the lung. He was treated by a French doctor. According to one account, Zhu De, then head of the Yunnan police, took him to the French hospital. The bullet was never removed, and for the rest of his life, he walked with his right shoulder slightly lowered. After he recovered, Tang Jiyao urged him to return to Guizhou, but he declined. Fearing that a long stay in Kunming would arouse suspicion, he left for Shanghai by the Yunnan–Vietnam railway and Haiphong.

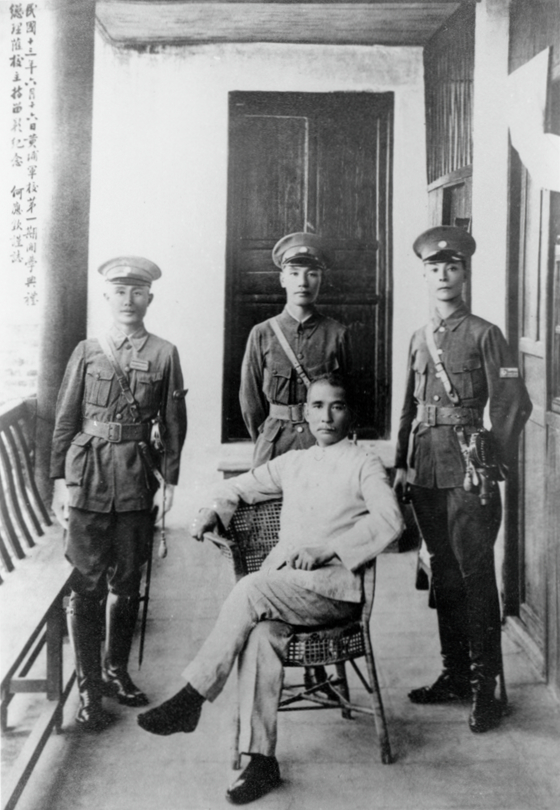
From left: He, Chiang Kai-shek (centre) and Wang Boling with Sun Yat-sen at the opening of the Whampoa Military Academy, June 1924

In 1924, through his Japanese military academy classmate Wang Boling, He met Chiang Kai-shek in Guangzhou. Sun Yat-sen appointed him a military counsellor at his headquarters to help establish the Whampoa Military Academy. At the academy, where Wang Boling headed the teaching department and Ye Jianying was his deputy, He was one of the instructors, together with Qian Dajun, Liu Zhi and Gu Zhutong. He became the academy's chief military instructor. When the academy's cadets were formed into two training regiments with more than 3,000 officers and men, He commanded the 1st Regiment and Wang Boling the 2nd.

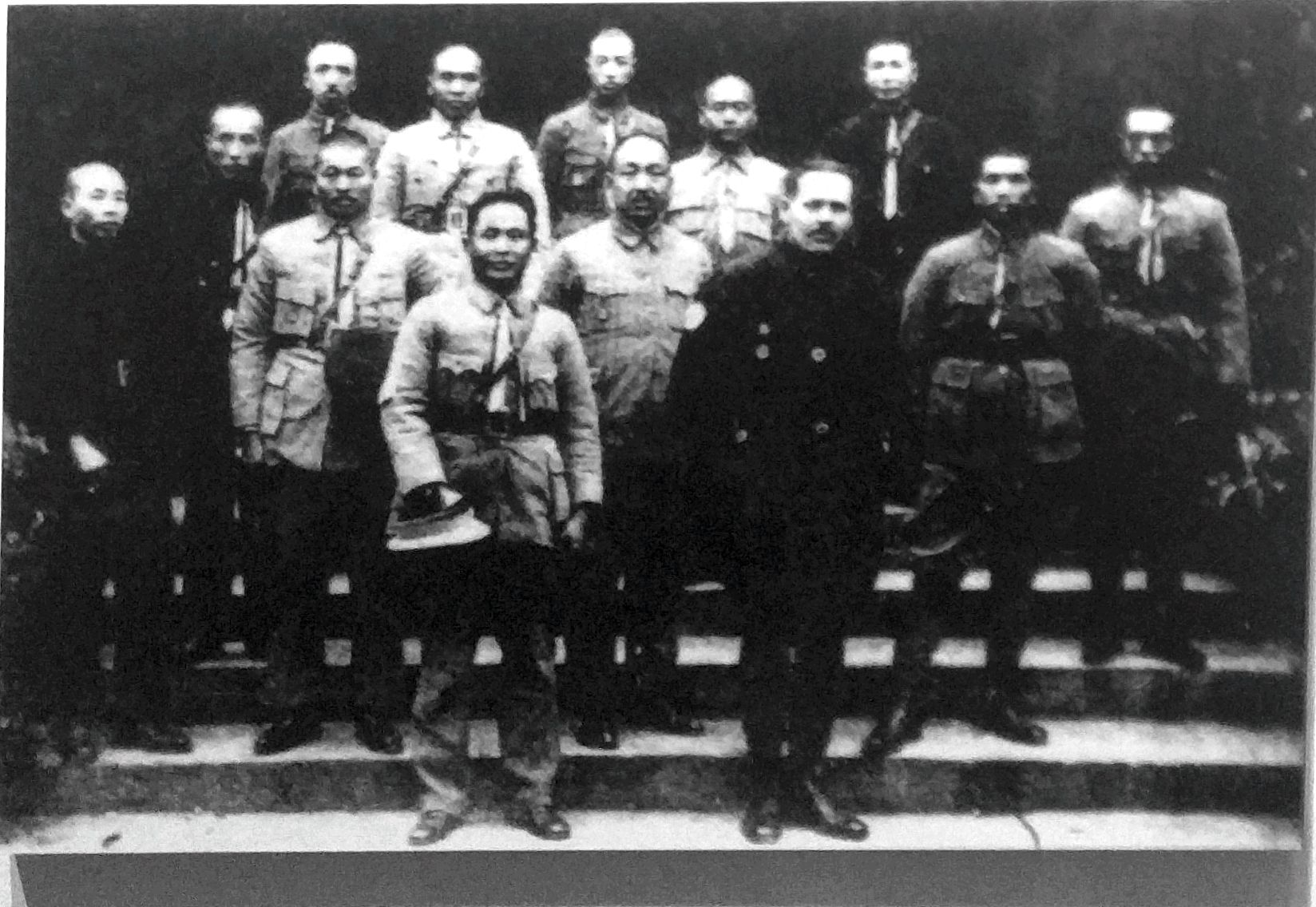
He with the Soviet military adviser Vasily Blyukher during the Eastern Expedition

In the first Eastern Expedition, launched in February 1925, He led the 1st Training Regiment against Chen Jiongming. His regiment was the main assault force at Tamsui and fought in the Battle of Mianhu, and it helped to take Chaozhou and Shantou. In April 1925, the training regiments were expanded into the Party Army's 1st Brigade, with He as its commander. In June, when the Yunnan and Guangxi armies under Yang Ximin and Liu Zhenhuan revolted in Guangzhou, He withdrew his brigade from the East River front and helped to suppress the revolt.

The Nationalist government then reorganized its forces as the National Revolutionary Army. The Whampoa forces became the 1st Army, about 10,600 strong, with three divisions: He commanded the 1st Division, Wang Maogong the 2nd and Qian Dajun the Training Division. In the second Eastern Expedition, which began in September 1925, He commanded the 1st Column, which took Huizhou after heavy losses. He was then put in charge of post-war reconstruction in the Chaozhou–Shantou region and made head of the Whampoa academy's Chaozhou branch, and he represented Chiang's military and political authority in eastern Guangdong. There he trained troops in preparation for the Northern Expedition.

== Northern Expedition (1926–1928) ==
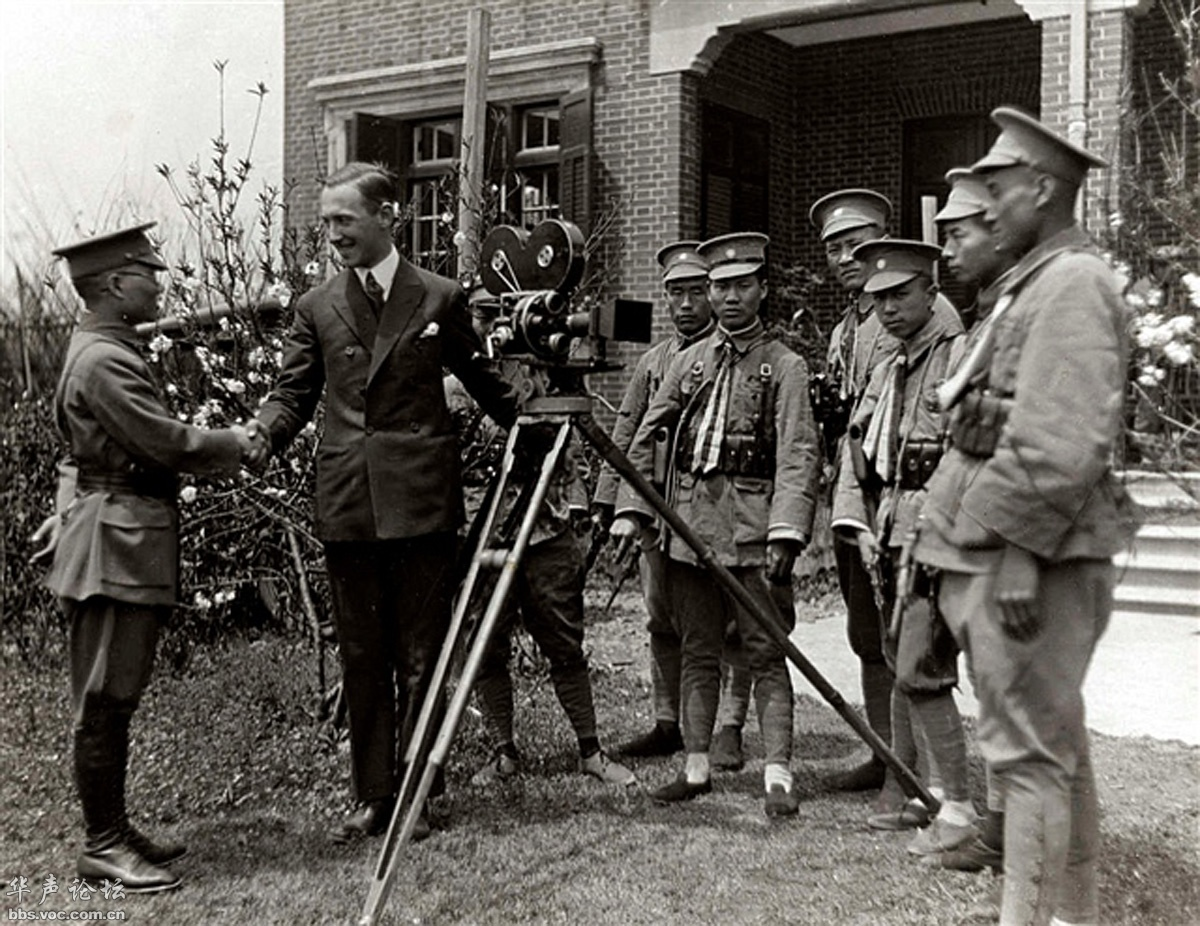
He Yingqin thanked for the cinematographer during Northern Expedition

In January 1926, He succeeded Chiang as commander of the 1st Army, which made him the leading military figure in the Guangzhou government after Chiang. When the Northern Expedition began in July 1926, he was given command of the eastern route against Sun Chuanfang in Fujian and Zhejiang. His troops launched a surprise attack on Songkou on 9 October. Advancing into Fujian, he took Yongding, from which the local commander, Zhou Yinren, barely escaped. He then captured Zhangzhou on 8 November and Quanzhou on 23 November 1926, and Fuzhou in December.

As several Fujian warlord forces went over to the Nationalists, He's forces were reorganized in December 1926 as the Eastern Route Army. He became its commander-in-chief, with six columns under his command and Bai Chongxi as front-line commander, and was given the task of advancing through Zhejiang to Shanghai. The army entered Hangzhou on 19 February 1927. On 14 March, Yang Shuzhuang, commander of the Beiyang government's Yangtze fleet, went over to the Nationalists and helped the Eastern Route Army to take Shanghai later that month. The army reached Zhenjiang on 23 March and, together with the Central Route Army, captured Nanjing on 24 March.

When the Kuomintang split between Nanjing and Wuhan in April 1927, He strongly supported Chiang's moves against the Communists at a meeting held on 2 April. On 17 July, the Nanjing government appointed him to its Military Commission. After Chiang resigned in August 1927, He, Li Zongren and Bai Chongxi together controlled military and political affairs in Nanjing. That month, He and Bai defeated Sun Chuanfang's attempt to recross the Yangtze at the Battle of Longtan, destroying more than 50,000 of his troops and capturing more than 40,000 rifles. His forces were then reorganized as the First Route Army, which crossed the Yangtze in pursuit of Sun's remaining troops.

When Chiang returned as commander-in-chief in January 1928, he took direct command of He's troops, which became the 1st Army Group, and made He chief of staff of the Northern Expedition headquarters in Nanjing. In February 1928, He became acting chairman of the Military Commission. He was also appointed chairman of the Zhejiang provincial government, although Jiang Bocheng carried out the role in practice.

== Minister of Military Affairs (1930–1944) ==
During the Chiang–Gui War of 1929, He served as chief of staff of the government forces and helped Chiang to defeat the New Guangxi clique. He was also elected to the Kuomintang's 3rd Central Executive Committee. In March 1930, he became Minister of Military Affairs, a post he held until 1944, and he also headed the Wuhan field headquarters, which guarded against Yan Xishan and Feng Yuxiang. In October 1930, as the Central Plains War drew to a close, he moved to the Zhengzhou field headquarters to oversee military affairs at the front and the settlement in the north-west.

In February 1931, He set up the Nanchang field headquarters to direct the Nationalist encirclement campaigns against the Communist base areas in Jiangxi. When Chiang took personal charge of the third campaign in June 1931, He served as front-line commander-in-chief and commander of the Left Wing Army Group, with Zhu Shaoliang, Jiang Dingwen and Chen Cheng under him. In February 1932, he was appointed commander-in-chief for the Jiangxi–Guangdong–Fujian border region and prepared the fourth campaign.

=== Dealings with Japan ===
In March 1933, after Zhang Xueliang resigned over the loss of Rehe, He took over as acting head of the Military Commission's Beiping branch. Following the government's policy of combining resistance with negotiation, he relied on the Great Wall as the main line of defence against the Japanese advance. On 31 May 1933, his representative, Xiong Bin, met Okamura Yasuji, deputy chief of staff of the Kwantung Army, at Tanggu and signed the Tanggu Truce on the terms drafted by the Japanese, without changing a word. In June, He asked the Executive Yuan to punish him. He was promoted to general first class in April 1935.

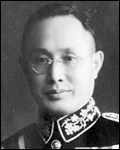
He Yingqin in 1930s

On 9 June 1935, Yoshijirō Umezu, commander of the Japanese garrison in North China, sent He a memorandum that demanded a reply within three days. The demands included the removal of the Hebei governor Yu Xuezhong, the closing of Kuomintang offices in Hebei and the withdrawal of central government troops from the province. He at first refused to sign, but on 6 July, after obtaining the Executive Yuan's approval, he sent Umezu a short letter accepting the demands. This exchange became known as the He–Umezu Agreement. Both the Tanggu Truce and the He–Umezu Agreement were widely condemned in China as betrayals of national interests.

In November 1935, the government abolished the Beiping branch of the Military Commission, appointed Song Zheyuan as pacification commissioner for Hebei and Chahar, and made He the Executive Yuan's representative in Beiping. In early December, at talks in Baoding, He told Japanese journalists that he hoped for "peace and friendship" between China and Japan. Japanese officials, however, made it clear that his continued presence in Beiping was unwelcome. He arranged the creation of the Hebei–Chahar Political Council under Song Zheyuan and returned to Nanjing on 14 December. There he told reporters that Song and his colleagues were loyal to the central government, and he denied reports that students had been killed in clashes with police in Beiping on 9 December.

=== Xi'an Incident ===
After Zhang Xueliang and Yang Hucheng detained Chiang in the Xi'an Incident of 12 December 1936, the Kuomintang leadership held an emergency meeting that night. H. H. Kung became acting premier, and He was put in charge of directing troop movements. He argued strongly for military action against Zhang and Yang. On 16 December, he was appointed commander-in-chief of a punitive expedition, with Liu Zhi and Gu Zhutong commanding its eastern and western army groups, and he prepared to bomb Xi'an. He also urged Wang Jingwei, who was in Europe, to return to China.

Chiang was released on 25 December and returned to Nanjing the next day, where He met him at the airport and explained that he had called for military action only out of duty. On 29 December, Chiang dissolved the punitive headquarters, although He continued to favour a military solution in dealing with Zhang's and Yang's troops. In 1937, He and Chiang oversaw the reorganization of the Northeastern Army and the 17th Route Army.

=== Second Sino-Japanese War ===
On 3 July 1937, days before the Marco Polo Bridge Incident, the Japanese military attaché Kita Seiichi warned He that war was inevitable unless China accepted Japan's terms. According to He's later account, he replied that China would resist to the end and that both countries would suffer, to the benefit of the Soviet Union and the Chinese Communists. On 12 August, He told the Kuomintang's Central Standing Committee that "peace is hopeless", and he argued for striking the Japanese before they could concentrate their forces. In August 1937, he became commander of the 4th War Zone while remaining Minister of Military Affairs.

In December 1937, the Supreme National Defence Council discussed German proposals for a settlement with Japan. He was among the officials who did not object to considering the terms, while Chiang remained reserved. In January 1938, He became Chief of the General Staff. In March 1942, he rejected a request from Zhou Enlai to expand the Communist Eighth Route Army to four corps of twelve divisions; the government was then funding it for 45,000 men.

In November 1944, He was replaced as Minister of Military Affairs by Chen Cheng, and in December, he became commander-in-chief of the Chinese Army, with headquarters in Kunming. Earlier that month, troops under his direction had recaptured Dushan, stabilizing the situation in Guizhou. In 1945, he directed the Battle of West Hunan and the counter-offensive in Guangxi, and drew up plans for an offensive into Guangdong.

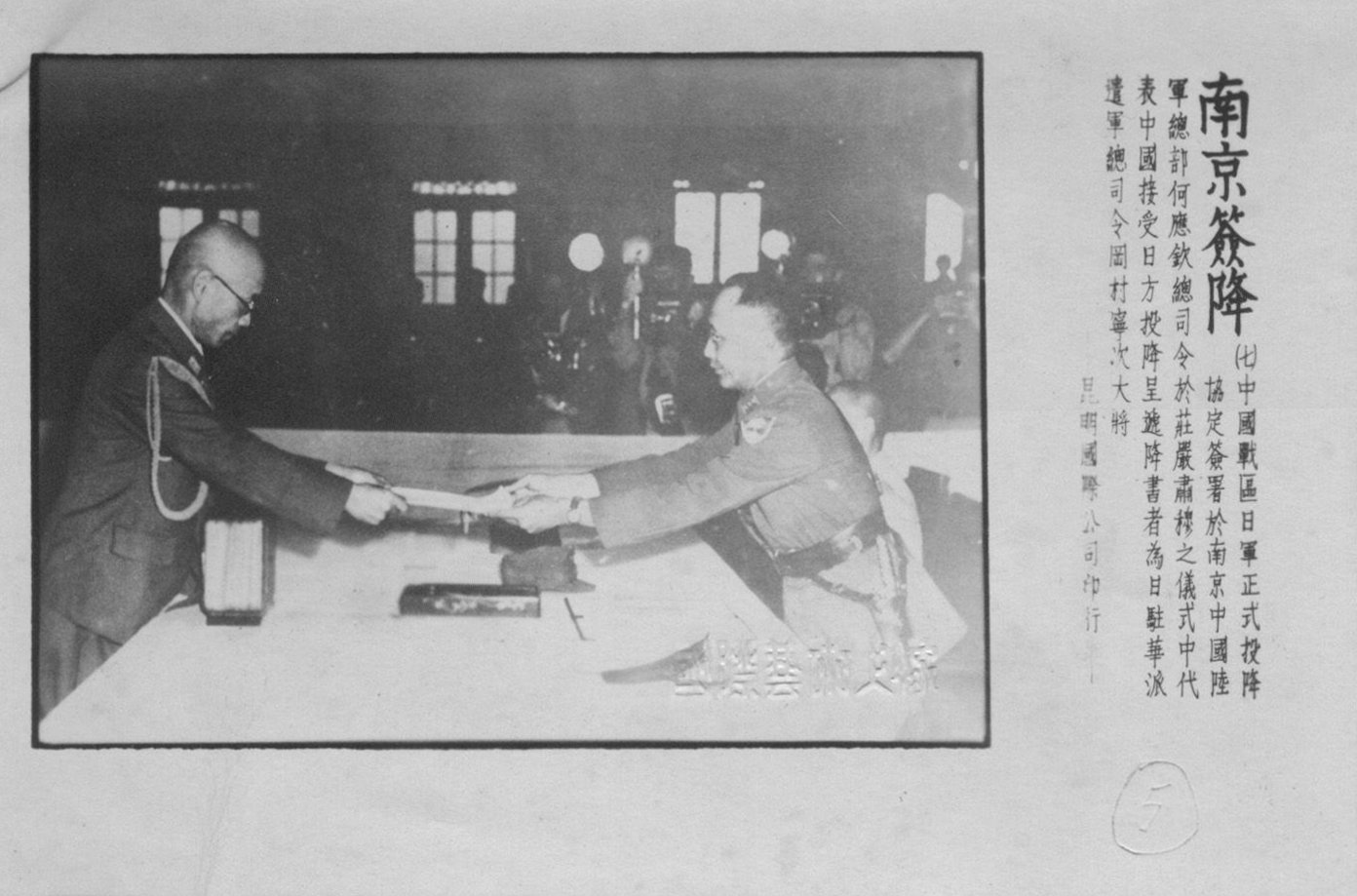
He (right) receives the instrument of surrender from Kobayashi Asasaburō in Nanjing, 9 September 1945

After Japan announced its surrender on 15 August 1945, Chiang designated He to accept the surrender of Japanese forces in the China theatre. On 20 August, He set up a forward headquarters at Zhijiang, Hunan. The next day, the Japanese envoy Takeo Imai arrived there and was given the Chinese Army's Memorandum No. 1, which set out the preparations the Japanese forces were to make for the surrender.

On 9 September 1945, at the Central Military Academy in Nanjing, He presided over the surrender ceremony before more than a thousand Chinese and foreign guests. On behalf of Chiang, as Supreme Commander of the China theatre, he accepted the surrender of General Yasuji Okamura, commander of the China Expeditionary Army. After Okamura signed the instrument of surrender, his chief of staff, Kobayashi Asasaburō, presented it to He. The next day, Okamura told He that he would now follow He's orders rather than those of the Japanese government, and on 12 September, He ordered that Okamura's command be renamed the liaison headquarters for Japanese officers and men in the China theatre.

== Chinese Civil War and premiership (1946–1949) ==
When the Military Commission was replaced by the Ministry of National Defense in June 1946, He was relieved of his posts as Chief of the General Staff and commander-in-chief of the army. He was sent to Washington as head of the Chinese delegation to the United Nations Military Staff Committee, and he met President Harry S. Truman on 29 June. In February 1947, he and the ambassador, Wellington Koo, called on Secretary of State George Marshall. He told reporters that the withdrawal of American mediators would not intensify the civil war, and he estimated the government's forces at about 150 divisions. In 1947, he also became chairman of the Strategic Advisory Committee.

In June 1948, He became Minister of National Defense in the cabinet of Weng Wenhao. Reporting to a closed session of the Legislative Yuan on the deteriorating situation in central China, he urged firm confidence that the Communists could still be defeated. As defeats at the front were followed by unrest behind the lines, the Wong cabinet fell and He resigned with it. After the Huaihai campaign, he went to Shanghai to recuperate. When a visitor urged him to stand by the government in its final crisis, he reportedly replied that Chen Cheng could play the loyal minister.

In February 1949, He asked the American ambassador, John Leighton Stuart, whether the United States would invite Chiang to visit, and he claimed that, given three months of full authority, he could stop the Communists from crossing the Yangtze. After Sun Fo resigned, the acting president, Li Zongren, nominated He as Premier. The Legislative Yuan approved the nomination, and He took office on 24 March 1949. At his first cabinet meeting, his government appointed its delegation for the peace talks with the Communists. On 7 April, he reported on the progress of the talks to the Kuomintang's Central Standing Committee in Guangzhou.

After the talks broke down, He ordered local governments on 21 April to tighten security and reimpose martial law. On 22 April, he attended a meeting with Chiang, Li Zongren, Bai Chongxi and Zhang Qun in Hangzhou, and Li then made him concurrently Minister of National Defense, with command of all the armed forces. The next day, the Communists took Nanjing, and He and his cabinet moved to Guangzhou. On 10 May, he told the Legislative Yuan that, although he would rather step aside, he would remain in office because the government could not afford instability. The next day, he chaired a military conference that agreed on a joint defence plan for southern and south-western China. On 14 May, he ordered that commanders who avoided battle be punished under military law. He offered his resignation on 20 May, and his cabinet resigned on 30 May 1949. In July, he became a member of the Kuomintang's Extraordinary Committee, and he soon moved to Taiwan.

== Later life in Taiwan ==
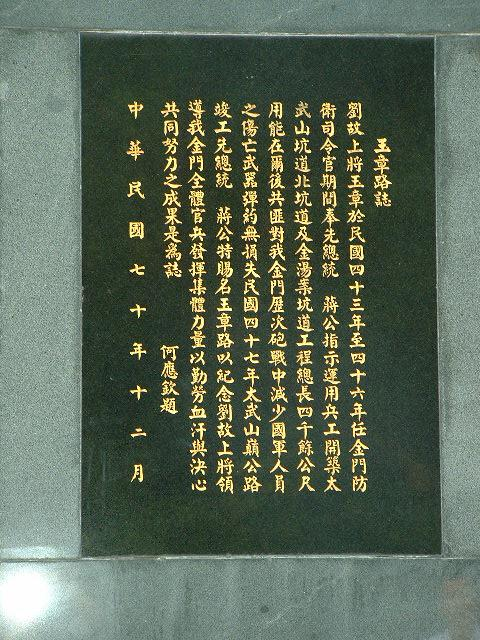
An inscription signed by He on Mount Taiwu, Kinmen, December 1981

In Taiwan, He served as chairman of the Strategic Advisory Committee of the Presidential Office until his death. He visited Japan in 1951 and 1955, where he was warmly received by former opponents. At one welcome meeting, Okamura Yasuji spoke of He's fair treatment of Japanese troops and civilians after the surrender. He frequently led Taiwanese delegations to conferences of the Moral Re-Armament movement.

In 1953, He, the general Sun Lianzhong and the mayor of Taipei, Wu San-lien, founded the Taipei Golf Club. With the help of the Chief of the General Staff, Chow Chih-jou, they obtained the use of military farmland near Taipei's South Airport, the site of today's Youth Park, for the course. In August 1962, he visited South Korea as a special envoy for its Liberation Day celebrations. In 1979, President Chiang Ching-kuo awarded him the Order of National Glory.

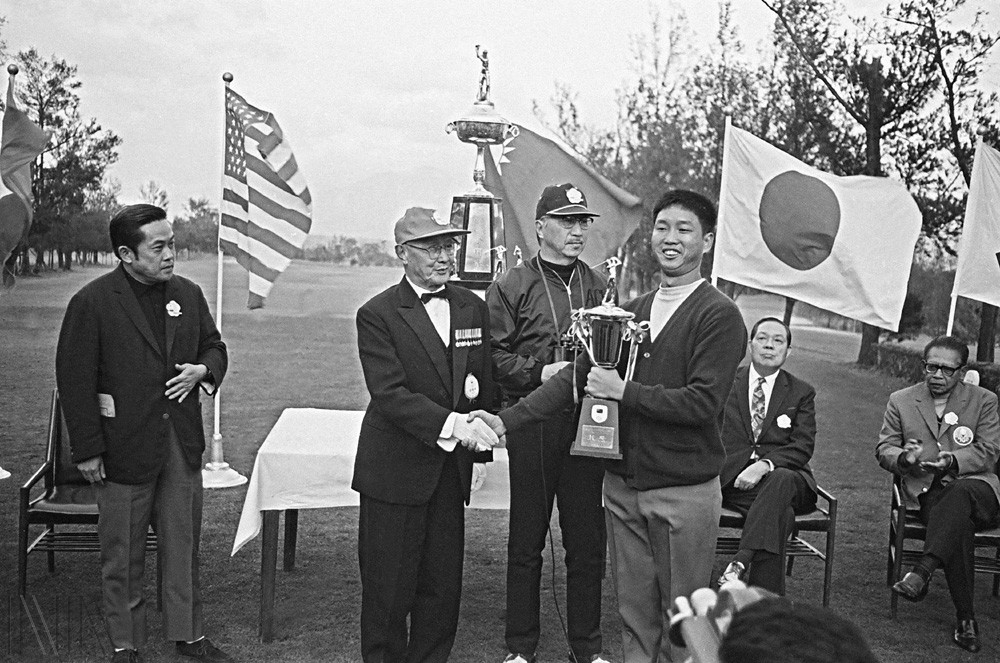
He Yingqin during 1973 Taiwan Open (Golf)

In 1982, after calls from overseas Chinese in New York, the Grand Alliance for China's Reunification under the Three Principles of the People was founded at Yangmingshan, with He as chairman of its executive committee. In September 1984, he published an open letter to Whampoa alumni denouncing the mainland's Whampoa alumni association as a tool of the Communists' united front.

He suffered a mild stroke in April 1986. He died of heart and lung failure at Taipei Veterans General Hospital on 21 October 1987, aged 97. The same day, Chiang Ching-kuo issued a presidential citation praising his military career and his service as Premier. On 22 October 1987, the day after He's death, local officials met fourteen of his relatives in his birthplace, Xingyi, to offer their condolences. The officials came from the Qianxinan Prefecture Communist Party's united front department, the prefecture's political consultative conference and its Taiwan affairs office. With the nickname of "Lucky General," he survived battles and campaigns and lived longer than most other patriarchs of the KMT, including Chiang. His remains are interred at Wuchih Mountain Military Cemetery in Taiwan.

== Legacy ==
In August 1948, after He criticized Chiang's interference in the appointment of officers, Chiang wrote a harsh assessment of him in his diary. He accused He of shifting blame and claiming credit, wrote that more than twenty years of patronage had failed to make him stand on his own, and called him "one of the greatest failures of my life".

The PLA Publishing House's Biographies of Senior Generals of the Republic of China portrays He as ambitious but unwilling to challenge Chiang openly, so that his career never escaped Chiang's shadow. It also notes that he was widely regarded as pro-Japanese during the war against Japan, while closely following Chiang's policies of resistance, accommodation with Japan and anti-communism.

Zhang Zige, a former confidential secretary to Soong Mei-ling, wrote in his memoirs that He had helped to arrange a visit to Chiang in August 1939 by a German envoy who urged China to make peace with Japan, a proposal that Chiang and Soong rejected.

== Personal life ==
On 30 April 1916, He married Wang Wenxiang in Guizhou. She was a niece of the Guizhou governor Liu Xianshi. They had an adopted daughter, He Lizhu.

== Awards and honors ==
=== Republic of China ===
- Order of Blue Sky and White Sun (10 October 1943)
- First Class of the Order of the Cloud and Banner (1 January 1936)
- Second Class of the Order of Brilliant Jade (22 March 1937)
- First Class of the Order of Propitious Clouds (1 January 1944)
- First Class of the Order of Brilliant Star (11 August 1944)
- Order of National Glory (11 March 1968)
- Order of Loyalty and Diligence (11 January 1946)
- Order of Grand Community (14 March 1947)
- Order of Cosmic Diagram (1 January 1948)
- Medal of Victory in the War of Resistance (10 October 1946)
- Commemorative Medal for the 10th Anniversary of the Oath-Taking Ceremony of the Northern Expedition of the National Revolutionary Army (1936)
- First Class of the Air Force Renaissance Medal of Honour
- Medal of the Armed Forces, A-1
- First Class of the Guanghua Medal

=== Foreign ===
- Grand Officer of the Legion of Honour (France, 1945)
- Grand Cordon of the Order of the Rising Sun (Japan, 1965)
- Medal of Military Merit (Mexico, 1946)
- First Class of the Order of Cultural Merit (South Korea, 1961)
- Knight Grand Cross of the Order of the Bath (United Kingdom, 1944)
- Commander of the Legion of Merit (United States, 1943)
- Medal of Freedom with gold palm (United States, 1945)

=== Honorary doctorates ===
- Honorary Doctor of Laws, Nihon University (December 1965)
- Honorary Doctor of Philosophy, Chinese Culture University (March 1983)

== In popular culture ==
He has been portrayed in films including The Xi'an Incident (1981) and The Founding of a Republic (2009).

== Works ==
- The Course of Five Years of the War of Resistance (五年來之抗戰經過). Chongqing: Victory Publishing House, 1942.
- The Course of the Eight-Year War of Resistance (八年抗戰之經過). Taipei: Ministry of National Defense, 1955.
- Report on the Surrender Received by the Chinese Army Headquarters in the China Theatre (中國戰區中國陸軍總司令部受降報告書). 1969.
- Who Actually Fought China's War of Resistance against Japan? (中國抗日戰爭究竟是誰打的？). Hong Kong: Altai Publishing, 1970.
- China and the Future of the World (中國與世界前途). Taipei: Cheng Chung Book Company, 1974.
- History of the Eight-Year War of Resistance against Japan (日軍侵華八年抗戰史). Taipei: Li Ming Cultural Enterprise, 1982.
- General He's Military Reports during the War of Resistance (何上將抗戰時期軍事報告). Shanghai: Shanghai Bookstore, 1990.

== See also ==
- New 6th Army

== General references ==
- Dupuy, Trevor N. Harper Encyclopedia of Military Biography, New York, 1992
- http://www.generals.dk/general/Qiu_Qing-quan/_/China.html
- Ministry of National Defense R.O.C
- US Naval War College
- https://web.archive.org/web/20090326011824/http://cgsc.leavenworth.army.mil/carl/download/csipubs/bjorge_huai.pdf

Government offices
Preceded by Sun Fo	Premier of China; 1949	Succeeded by Yan Xishan
