= Zhongfang (disambiguation) =

Zhongfang may refer to:

- Zhongfang County (中方县), a county in Hunan province, China.
- Zhongfang Town (中方镇), a town and the county seat of Zhongfang County, Hunan Province.
- Zhongfang, Linxiang (忠防镇), a town of Linxiang city, Hunan Province.
