= Zhijiang =

Zhijiang may refer to:

- Zhijiang, Hubei (枝江市), county-level city of Yichang, Hubei, China
- Zhijiang Dong Autonomous County (芷江侗族自治县), Huaihua, Hunan, China
- Zhijiang Town (Chinese: 芷江镇), a town and the county seat of Zhijiang Dong Autonomous County in Hunan
