= Yuanjia =

Yuanjia may refer to:

== Locations ==
- Yuanjia, Jiahe (袁家镇), a town in Jiahe County, Hunan
- Yuanjia, Zhongfang (袁家镇), a township of Zhongfang County, Hunan

== Historical eras ==
- Yuanjia (151–153), era name used by Emperor Huan of Han
- Yuanjia (424–453), era name used by Liu Yilong, emperor of Liu Song

== See also ==
- Chongming Island#History
