= Surrender ceremony of the Second Sino-Japanese War =

Japanese General Yasuji Okamura (right) surrenders to Chinese General He Yingqin (left) in Nanjing, 9 September 1945

The Japanese surrender ceremony that ended World War II in China (also called the Second Sino-Japanese War) occurred in Nanjing on 9 September 1945. The forces of the Imperial Japanese Army agreed with the Allies terms to cease all armed conflict in the Pacific. The ceremony occurred a week after the war had officially ended in Asia on 2 September.

The Pacific War came to an end when the United States dropped two atomic bombs on Japan in August 1945 and the declaration of war on Japan by the Soviet Union. Imperial Japanese armed forces were ordered to surrender in the Hirohito surrender broadcast on 15 August 1945. The surrender ceremony in China, which was scheduled for 5 September 1945, was delayed for four days. A surrender ceremony was held on 21 August 1945 at the Zhijiang Airfield in Zhijiang County, which preceded the official surrender ceremony.

The official surrender ceremony of World War II in China was held in the auditorium of the Central Army Military Academy in Nanjing, Republic of China at 9:00 Kansu-Szechwan Time (UTC+07:00) on 9 September 1945. During the 15-minute ceremony, General Yasuji Okamura, Commander-in-Chief of the Chinese Expeditionary Force of the Imperial Japanese Army, signed the surrender document which was written in both Japanese and Chinese. The unconditional surrender was overseen and accepted by Kuomintang General He Yingqin, the Chinese representative of Allies of World War II and the commander-in-chief of the Republic of China National Revolutionary Army and British Major-General Eric Hayes. After the Allied victory in the Pacific, General Douglas MacArthur ordered all Japanese forces within China (excluding Manchuria), Taiwan and French Indochina north of 16° north latitude to surrender to Chiang Kai-shek, and the Japanese troops in China formally surrendered on 9 September 1945, at 9:00. The ninth hour of the ninth day of the ninth month was chosen in echo of the Armistice of 11 November 1918 (on the eleventh hour of the eleventh day of the eleventh month) and because "nine" (九 jiǔ) is a homophone of the word for "long lasting" (久) in Chinese (to suggest that the peace won would last forever).

The Allies had also agreed that that the Shanghai International Settlement would be abolished.

Subsequently, on 10 October 1945, 47 Divisions from the former Imperial Japanese Army officially surrendered to Chinese military officials and representatives of the allied forces at the Forbidden City, Beijing.
