= Leng Xin =

Chinese general (1900–1987)

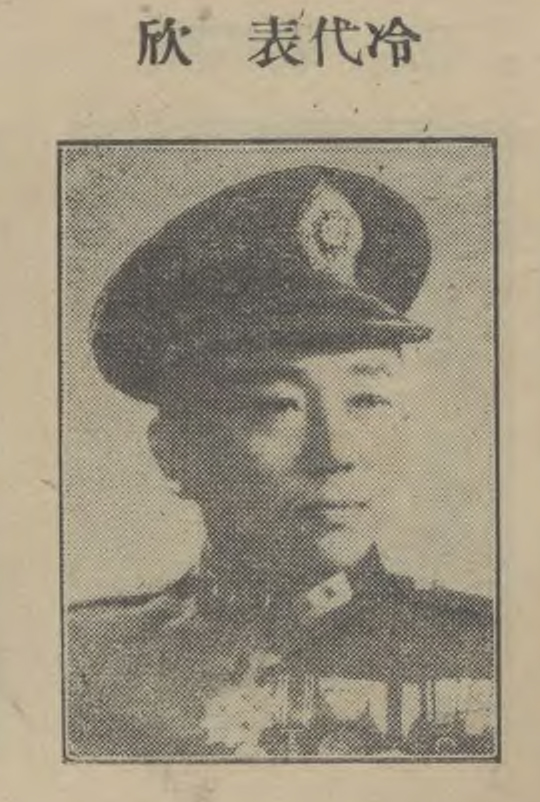
- Born: 7 November 1900; Xinghua, Jiangsu, Qing dynasty
- Died: 6 February 1987 (aged 86) Taiwan Province, Taiwan
- Allegiance: Republic of China
- Branch: (Republic of China (1912–1949)) National Revolutionary Army
- Rank: Lieutenant General
- Conflicts: Second Sino-Japanese War; Chinese Civil War

Leng Xin (7 November 1900 – 6 February 1987), courtesy name Rong'an, was a Chinese lieutenant general and politician of the Republic of China.

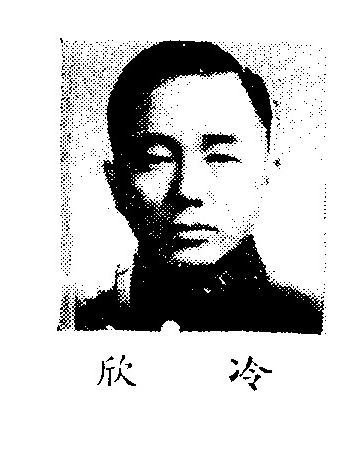

== Life ==
Xin was born in Xinghua, Jiangsu, on 11 November 1900. In 1944, he served as Director of the Military Affairs Department of the Chinese Army Headquarters and Lieutenant General Deputy Chief of Staff of the Chinese Army Headquarters in the Chinese Theater. After the war, he was awarded the Third Class Medal of Honor, the Medal of Loyalty and Diligence and the American Medal of Freedom. The first batch of graduates from Huangpu School.

== Surrender of Zhijiang ==
At the Zhijiang surrender ceremony on 21 August 1945, Allied representative Xiao Yisu was in the center, Leng Xin was on the left, and Brigadier General Bodno, Chief of Staff of the US Army China Theater Combat Command, was on the right. The Japanese representative was Takeo Imai, who represented the Japanese commander Yasuji Okamura. On 9 September, Leng Xin presented Japan's letter of surrender to the commander-in-chief of the Chinese theater, Chiang Kai-shek.

== Family ==
In the spring of 1947, in order to show that he would never forget his mother's upbringing, he returned to his hometown to bury his late mother. When he visited a teacher, he learned that Xinghua's education was backward, so he planned to establish Xinghua "Private Nianyi Middle School" to benefit his hometown.

== In Taiwan ==
In September 1959, he retired with the rank of Army Lieutenant General. After retiring, he became active in the field of historical research. After 1964, he was appointed as a professor at Soochow University and Chinese Culture University, teaching modern history. Many of Taiwan's contemporary historians have deep friendships with him. He studies modern history, because many historical facts are based on personal experience, and there are many first-hand historical materials and original opinions, which are extremely authoritative. Therefore, he was appointed as a part-time lecturer at the National Defense Research Institute, and was appointed as Huagang Professor (tenured professor) at the Cultural University. In addition to the hourly fee, he also received a monthly research fee of 10,000 yuan as a courtesy, which Leng Xin was proud of. Leng Xin has written articles such as "The Successful Strategy of Han Gaozu" and "The Successful Strategy of Ming Taizu". Among them, "The Successful Strategy of Ming Taizu" was read out at the International Chinese Studies Conference in August 1968. In these writings of his, the arguments are rigorous and some of his insights are very penetrating.
