= Huaihua Zhijiang Airport =

Huaihua Zhijiang Airport 怀化芷江机场
- IATA: HJJ; ICAO: ZGCJ

Summary
- Airport type: Public
- Serves: Huaihua
- Location: Zhijiang County, Hunan
- Coordinates: 27°26′29″N 109°41′59″E

Map
- Location of airport in Hunan

Runways
Direction	Length		Surface
Direction	m	ft	Surface
04/22	2,200	7,218	Concrete

Statistics (2025)
- Passengers: 417,485
- Aircraft movements: 10,531
- Cargo (metric tons): 17.8

Huaihua Zhijiang Airport
- Simplified Chinese: 怀化芷江机场
- Traditional Chinese: 懷化芷江機場
Transcriptions
Standard Mandarin
- Hanyu Pinyin: Huáihuà Zhǐjiāng Jīchǎng

Huaihua Zhijiang Airport (IATA: HJJ, ICAO: ZGCJ) is an airport serving the city of Huaihua in Hunan Province, China. It is located in Zhijiang Dong Autonomous County, 31 kilometers from the city center. The airport was built in 1942 and was the second largest military airfield in the Far East for the Allies during World War II. On 21 August 1945 Japan officially surrendered to China near the airfield. Construction to convert the airport for civilian use was started in December 2002 and the airport was reopened in September 2004.

== History ==
On December 1, 1934, the Nationalist government issued an order to construct Zhijiang Airport, marking the beginning of the construction of this important military airfield for the War of Resistance against Japan.

In 1935, the site selection for Zhijiang Airport began, but it was later shelved due to technical reasons. In October 1936, the construction plan was finalized, and the site was selected at Nanmuping, about 1 kilometer away from the east gate of the county town. The airport, measuring 800 meters square, was built on the basis of the original ancient drill ground.

In December 1937, construction of Zhijiang Airport officially began, with more than 19,000 workers from six nearby counties participating in the construction. During the War of Resistance against Japan, it served as an important military base for the Sino-American air forces and was known as the "second largest airport in the Far East".

From early 1944 to August 1945, large numbers of Chinese and American aircraft—including P‑40 Warhawks, P‑51 Mustangs, P‑61 Black Widow fighters, reconnaissance aircraft, B‑25 medium bombers, and large C‑46 transport planes—were concentrated at Huaihua Zhijiang Airport. At their peak, as many as 300 to 400 aircraft were gathered there.

From August 21 to 23, 1945, the "Zhijiang Surrender Ceremony" was held in Zhijiang, marking the final defeat of the invading Japanese army. Xiao Yisu, Chief of Staff of the National Revolutionary Army, and Thomas S. Timberlake, Chief of Staff of the U.S. Army Operations Command in the China Theater, representing Commander-in-Chief He Yingqin of the Army in the China Theater, accepted the surrender of Japanese representative Takeo Imai.

During the Battle of Western Hunan from April to June 1945, planes taking off from Zhijiang Airport dropped a large number of incendiary bombs, providing strong support to ground troops. Throughout the entire Battle of West Hunan, the Flying Tigers flew more than 2,500 sorties of fighter planes and 183 sorties of bombers, killing more than 10,000 enemy troops.

The airport was halted due to expansion work, which officially commenced in January 2003. The work was completed in December 2004, the airport had a total investment of 180 million yuan. The airport resumed operations in December 2005. After flights resumed, the Civil Aviation Administration officially renamed it "Huaihua Zhijiang Airport". The airport became a Class 4C military-civilian airport, with a 2,600-meter-long, 45-meter-wide concrete runway and an apron area of over 10,000 square meters, capable of accommodating full-load takeoffs and landings of various aircraft types, including the A320 and B737-300. The maiden flight took place on December 19, 2005, with an Airbus A319 aircraft taking off from Guangzhou, and landing at Huaihua Zhijiang Airport, marking the official reopening of the airport.

On December 12, 2012, the second phase expansion and renovation project of Huaihua Zhijiang Airport in Hunan Province was officially commenced. The project, with a total investment of approximately 424 million yuan, focused on extending the runway to 2,600 meters, constructing new connecting taxiways, and expanding the apron, aiming to enhance the airport's comprehensive transportation capacity and meet the target of 400,000 passenger trips by 2020. On March 30, 2017, an Airbus A320 aircraft flying from Shanghai Hongqiao Airport to Zhijiang landed at Huaihua Zhijiang Airport, marking the 2,600-meter runway was put into use at Huaihua Zhijiang Airport.

On December 29, 2016, the third phase expansion and renovation project of Huaihua Zhijiang Airport's terminal building was officially approved by the Hunan Provincial Development and Reform Commission. The new terminal building has a total construction area of 9964.88 square meters, and the civil engineering work was completed by the end of 2021.

In June 2021, the terminal building's ancillary aircraft parking facilities project was officially approved by the Hunan Provincial Development and Reform Commission. Construction began in January 2022 and is expected to be completed in May 2022. After the expansion, the number of parking stands will increase to 6 (6C), which can accommodate the full-load take-off and landing of Boeing 737-800 and Airbus A321 aircraft, with a designed annual throughput of 1.5 million passengers. On November 21, 2022, the ancillary aircraft parking facilities project of the terminal building at Huaihua Zhijiang Airport passed industry acceptance. On September 1, 2023, the new terminal building of Huaihua Zhijiang Airport was put into use.

== Airlines and destinations ==
Airlines	Destinations
Air Chang'an	Sanya, Xi'an
China United Airlines	Beijing–Daxing
Kunming Airlines	Kunming, Nanjing
Loong Air	Hangzhou, Lijiang
Tianjin Airlines	Haikou, Xi'an

== World War II ==
During World War II, the airport was known as Chihkiang (Chih Kiang) Airfield (which is the Wade-Giles transcription of the same name) and was used by the United States Army Air Forces Fourteenth Air Force as part of the China Defensive Campaign (1942–1945). Its primary use by the Americans was as an airborne photo-reconnaissance and as a transport airfield.

Chihkiang Air Base was also the headquarters of the Fourteenth Air Force Chinese-American Composite Wing (Provisional) (CACW), whose squadrons flew P-40 Warhawk aircraft. The operational units of the CACW were jointly commanded by both American and Chinese air force officers, and the unit's aircraft were jointly manned by American and Chinese pilots and air crewmen. On 10 April 1945, the Japanese started an offensive for Chihkiang, however, by 10 May the CACW had attacked and mauled the Japanese forces so severely, the Japanese had to retreat to Paoching.

The Americans closed their facilities at the airport in early October 1945.

== See also ==
- List of airports in China
