= Wang Wenhua =

Wang Wenhua is the name of:

- Wang Wenhua (writer) (born 1967), contemporary Taiwanese novelist
- Wang Wenhua (footballer) (born 1977), former Chinese footballer, currently a coach
- Wang Wenhua (host), Chinese television host
- Wang Wenhua (politician), former Chinese politician
- Chin Peng (1924–2013), born as Wang Wenhua, a Malaysian politician
