= 1945 Zhijiang surrender ceremony =

Event in the Second Sino-Japanese War

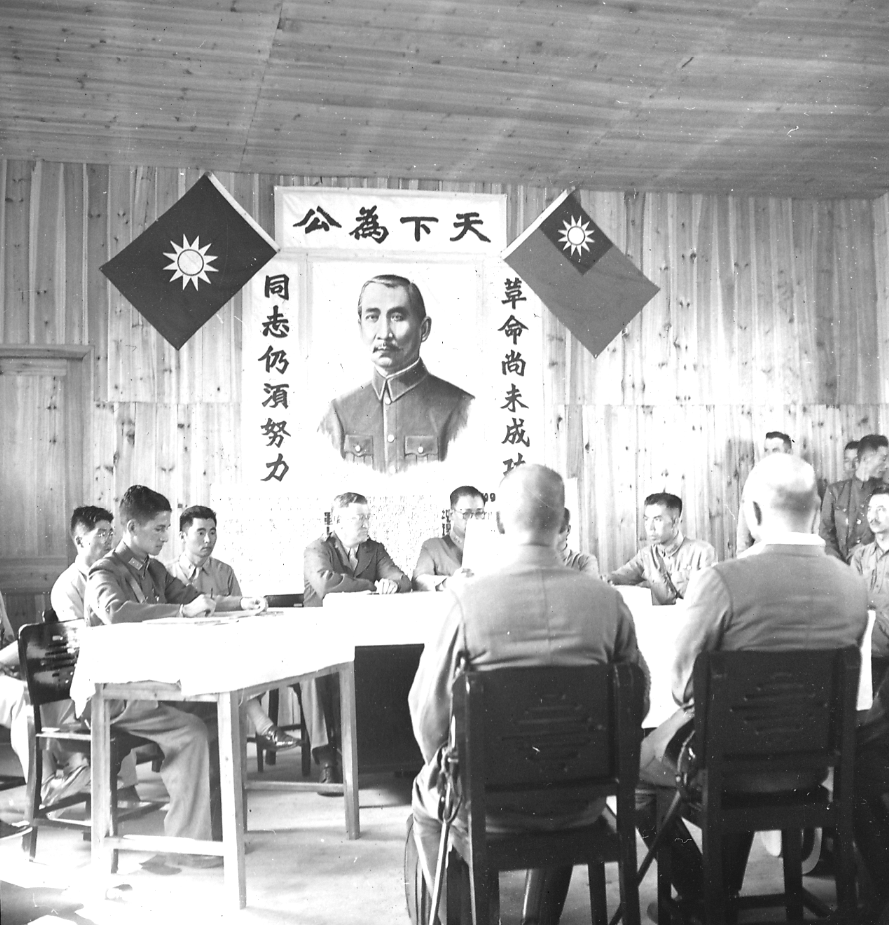
Surrender ceremony in Zhijiang (21 August 1945)

The 1945 Zhijiang surrender ceremony, also known as the Zhijiang negotiated surrender (Chinese: 芷江洽降), was a surrender ceremony held on 21 August 1945 at the Zhijiang Airfield in Zhijiang County, Hunan, Republic of China. The ceremony brought together senior Chinese military commanders, American liaison officers and a Japanese delegation headed by Major General Takeo Imai, Deputy Chief of Staff of the Japanese China Expeditionary Army. The proceedings established the framework for the surrender process through the 'Memorandum No. 1', which outlined surrender terms, designated surrender zones across occupied territories and created protocols for the handover of Japanese-controlled areas to Chinese military authorities.

== Background ==
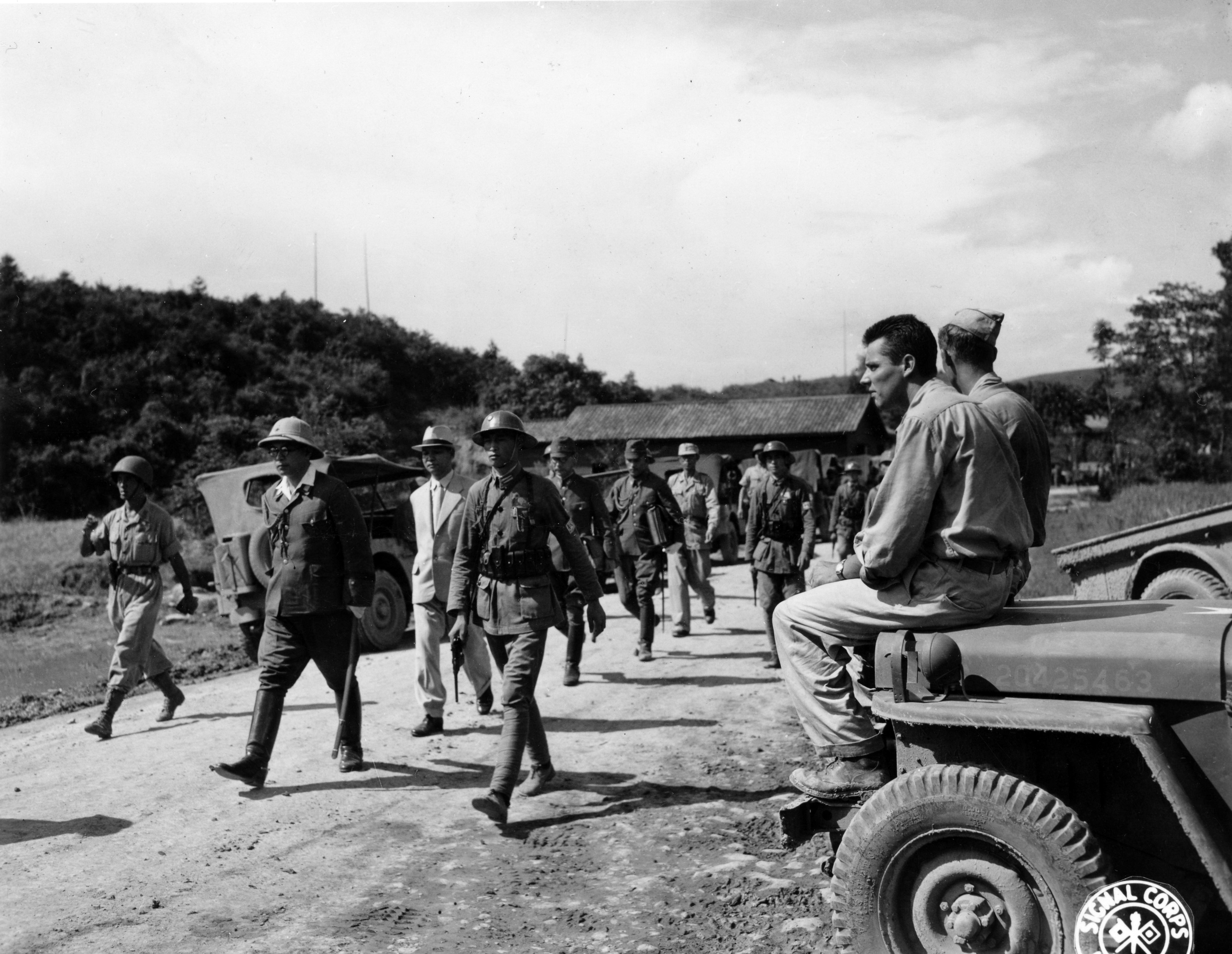
Japanese delegation arriving in Zhijiang

During the Second Sino-Japanese War, Hunan Province was one of the principal battlefields. Major engagements in the province include Changsha, Changde, Hengyang and western Hunan. Zhijiang Airfield was the second largest military airfield controlled by the Chinese Nationalist government. During the war, the American Flying Tigers operated from the airfield in support of Chinese forces against the Japanese. At the peak of the war, more than 300 warplanes were stationed at Zhijiang.

According to the son of Lieutenant General Xiao Yisu, Chief of Staff of the China Theater, General Chen Cheng initially proposed dividing China into three surrender zones centered on Beijing, Nanjing and Guangzhou. Xiao argued to Commander-in-Chief He Yingqin that because Japanese forces in China were under the command of a single commander, Yasuji Okamura, the surrender should occur at one central location. He recommended Zhijiang as it was centrally located between Kunming, Chongqing and Nanjing, making it convenient for both Chinese and American representatives from Chongqing and Kunming, and representatives from the Japanese headquarters in Nanjing to travel to Zhijiang. Furthermore, the airfield itself had excellent infrastructure, suffering minimal damage during the war, with its runways remaining intact and capable of safely accommodating various aircraft. Chiang Kai-shek eventually accepted the proposal and personnel from the Army Headquarters began arriving in Zhijiang to prepare for the surrender proceedings.

== Proceedings ==
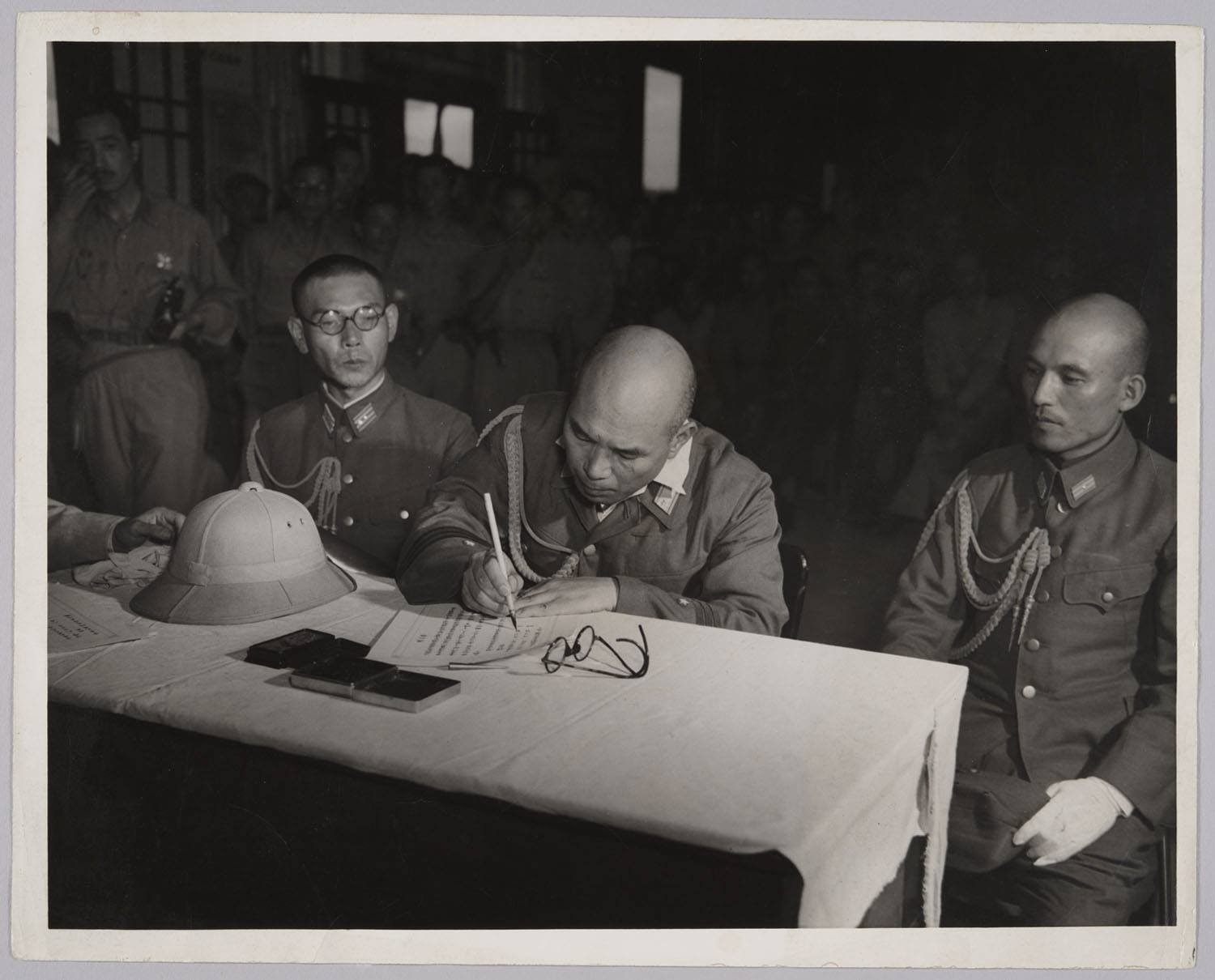
Takeo Imai, head of the Japanese delegation, signing the surrender document

On 15 August 1945, Chiang Kai-shek telegraphed General Okamura instructing him to send representatives to Yushan County in Jiangxi to receive orders from He Yingqin. Okamura replied on August 17 that he would dispatch his Deputy Chief of Staff, Major General Takeo Imai, and other officers. On the evening of August 20, 1945, He Yingqin held a conference of military and government officials at Zhijiang and announced the establishment of the Army Forward Headquarters. He announced that the Army Headquarters had received orders to handle the negotiated surrender of the entire nation. The specific tasks were:

- Prepare to receive the negotiated surrender representatives of General Yasuji Okamura, Commander-in-Chief of the Japanese China Expeditionary Army.
- Stipulate that military commanders of various Chinese war zones receive the Japanese surrender and manage the transfer of territories, and quickly transport troops to various occupied areas.
- Establish an advance command headquarters in Nanjing.
- Airlift troops to Shanghai and Nanjing to accept Japanese-occupied areas.
- Hold a surrender ceremony on August 21, with Chief of Staff Xiao Yisu designated to preside. Following the principle of equivalent military ranks, Major General Chen Yingzhuang was assigned to receive the Japanese surrender representatives.

Due to weather conditions affecting Yushan Airport in Jiangxi, the location was changed to Zhijiang Airport. On 21 August 1945, a Japanese Mitsubishi Ki-57 transport aircraft arrived at Zhijiang under the escort of P-51 Mustang fighters of the Republic of China Air Force. The Japanese delegation consisted of Major General Takeo Imai, Lieutenant Colonel Hashishima Yoshio, Major Maekawa Kunio and interpreter Kimura Tatsuo. They were received by Lieutenant General Xiao Yisu, Deputy Chief of Staff Leng Xin and Major General B. M. Fitch, Chief of Staff of the United States Army Command in the China Burma India Theater.

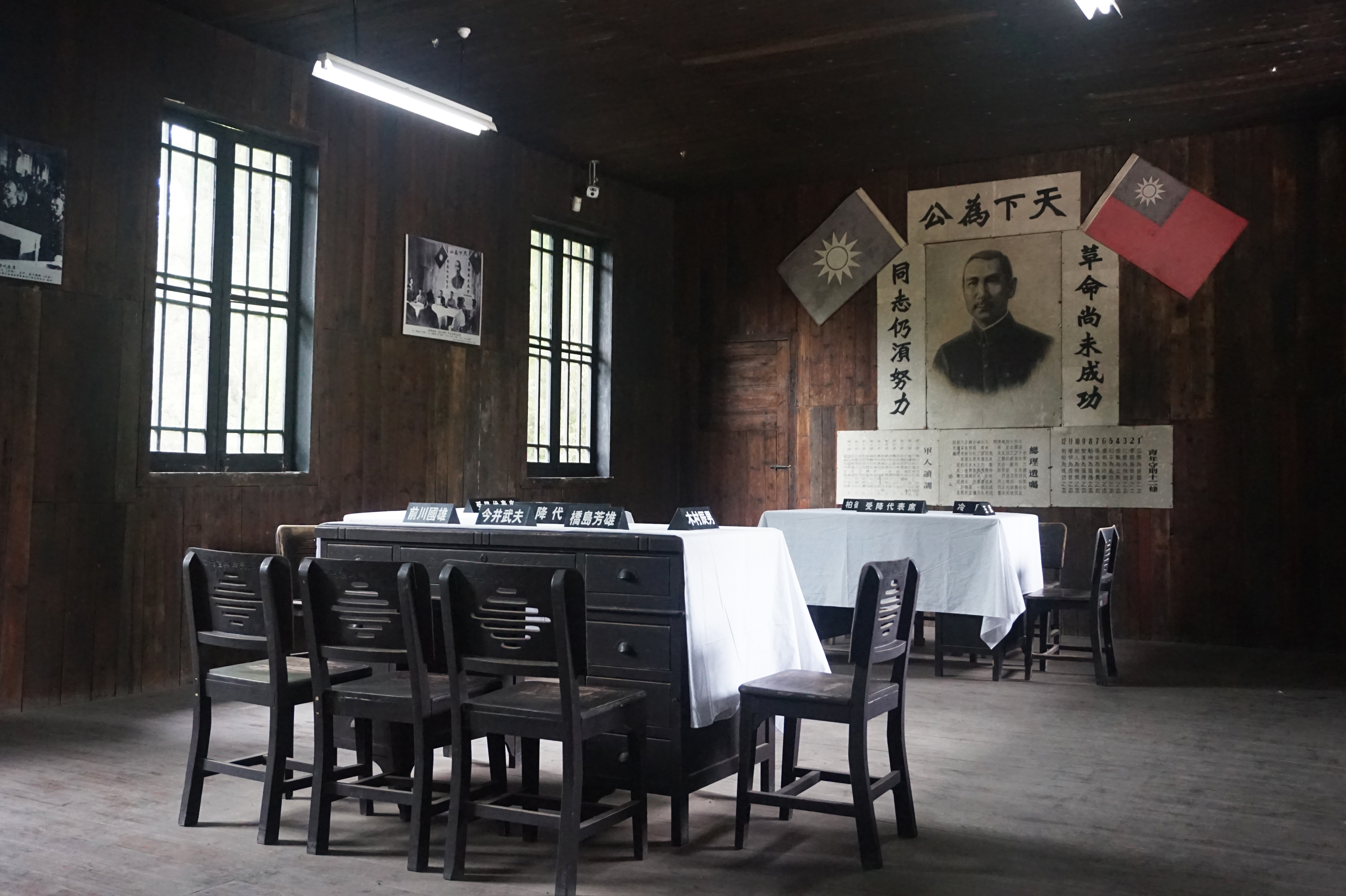
The hall where the surrender ceremony took place, pictured in 2017

When requested to provide deployment maps of all Japanese forces in China, Taiwan and northern Vietnam, Imai stated that forces stationed in Taiwan and northern French Indochina were not under the command of the China Expeditionary Army and therefore could not be included. He nevertheless presented maps showing Japanese troop dispositions in China. Xiao Yisu then read aloud the 'Memorandum No. 1' issued by He Yingqin to Okamura. The document stated that He, acting under the authority of Chiang Kai-shek, would accept the surrender of Japanese forces in China (excluding Manchuria), Taiwan and territories north of the 16th parallel in French Indochina. The memorandum also included the allocation of surrender zones and the commanders responsible for accepting the surrender in each area.

Imai signed and sealed a certificate acknowledging receipt of the memorandum and expressed his willingness to cooperate with the establishment of an advance headquarters of the Chinese Army in Nanjing. On August 27, 1945, Leng Xin and senior adviser Chen Zhuo proceeded to Nanjing to establish the advance headquarters of the China Army Command. The Zhijiang Surrender preceded the official surrender ceremony at Nanjing on 9 September 1945, and marked the beginning of China's acceptance of Japan's surrender.

== Memorial ==
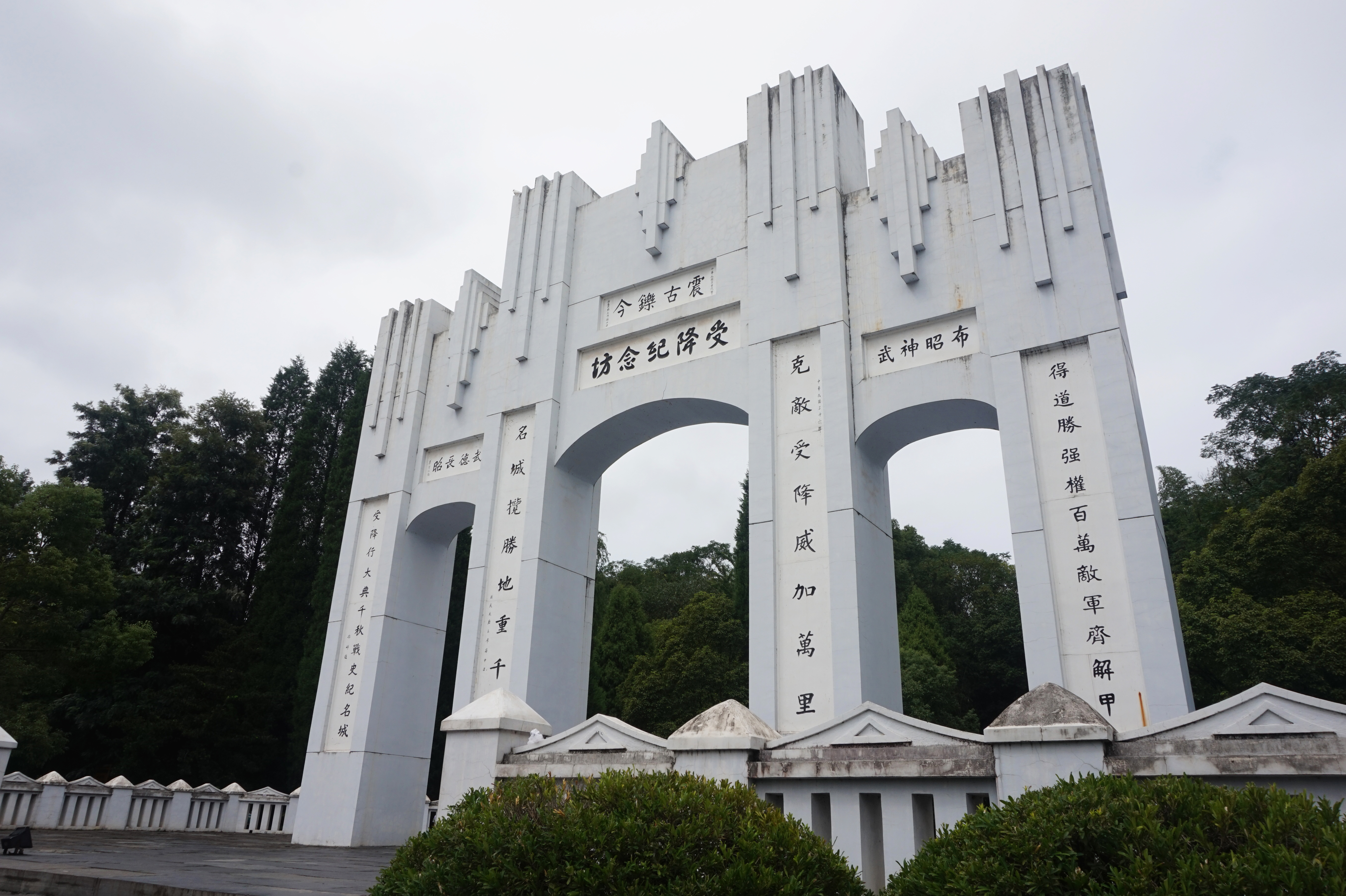
The entry to the Zhijiang Surrender Hall, pictured in 2017

In 1946, the Zhijiang Surrender Memorial Arch was constructed at near the site of the surrender ceremony. The hall where the surrender occurred is now a memorial hall commemorating the event. Both are located in Qiliqiao Village in Zhijiang County.

== Bibliography ==
- Xiong, Mike (2011). The Stone of Hope: Martin Luther King Memorial and Master Sculptor Lei Yixin. ISBN 9781465336453.
- CASS (2025). A New History of World War II. Chinese Academy of Social Sciences (CASS).
