= Tuoyuan =

Coordinates: 27°34′23″N 110°0′41″E

Tuoyuan Subdistrict (Chinese: 坨院街道; pinyin: Tuóyuàn Jiēdào) is a subdistrict and the seat of local government of Hecheng District in Huaihua Prefecture-level City, Hunan, China. Merging the former Shimen Township (Chinese: 石门乡) to it, the subdistrict was reformed on November 25, 2015. It has an area of 86.53 km^{2} (33.41 sq mi) with a population of 62,700 (as of 2015 end). Its administrative centre is at Xueyuanling Community (Chinese: 学院岭社区).
