= Hecheng, Huaihua =

Hecheng 鹤城区
- District
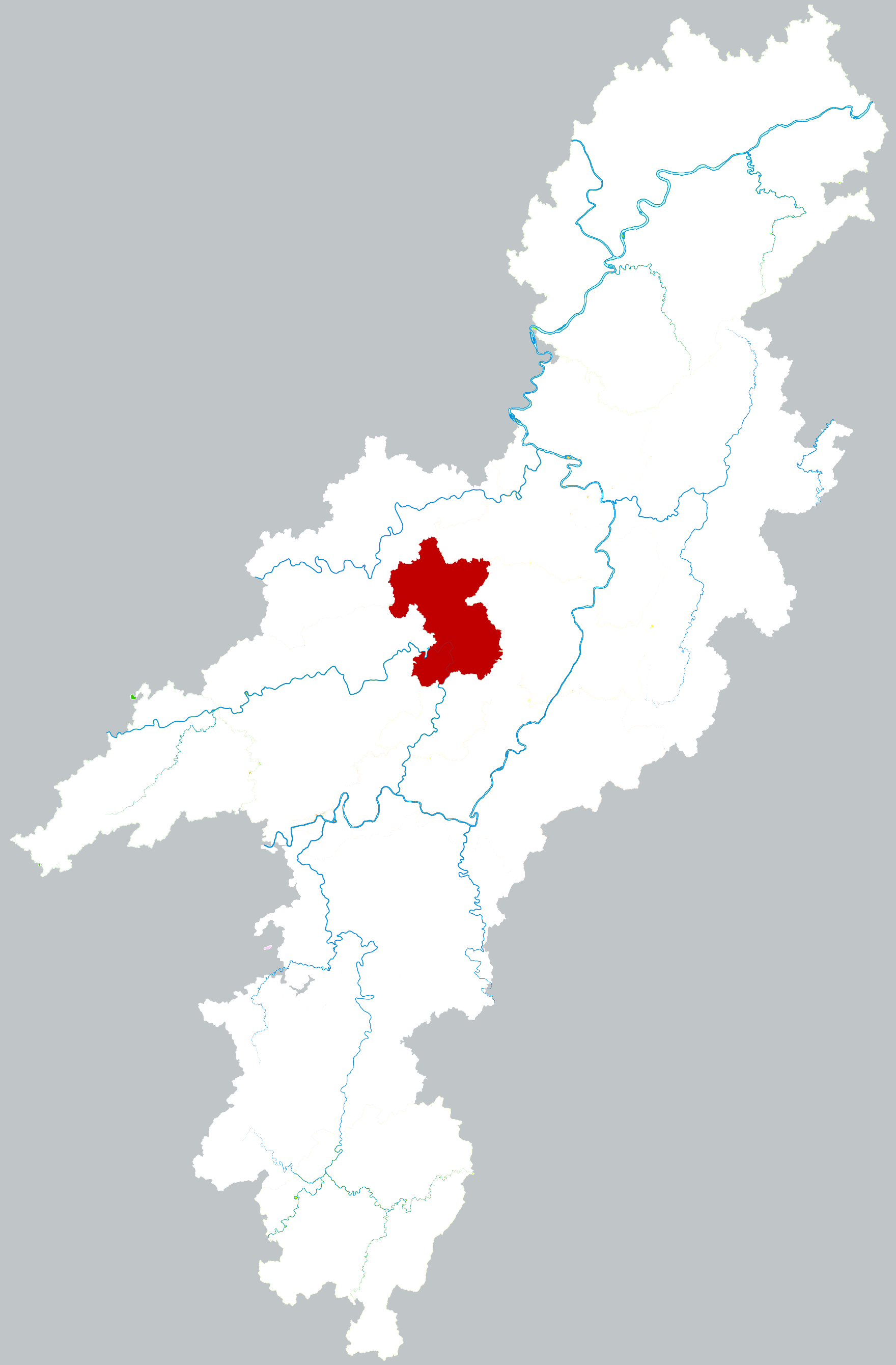
- Location of Hecheng District within Huaihua

- Location in Hunan
- Coordinates: 27°32′56″N 109°58′49″E
- Country: China
- Province: Hunan
- Prefecture-level city: Huaihua
- District seat: Tuoyuan Subdistrict

Area
  - Total: 728.81 km^{2} (281.40 sq mi)

Population (2020 census)
  - Total: 712,584
  - Density: 977.74/km^{2} (2,532.3/sq mi)
- Time zone: UTC+8 (China Standard)
- Website: www.hechengqu.gov.cn

Hecheng District (simplified Chinese: 鹤城区; traditional Chinese: 鶴城區; pinyin: Hèchéng Qū) is the only urban district of the prefecture-level city of Huaihua, Hunan Province, China.

Located in central Huaihua, Hecheng District is bordered to the northwest by Mayang County, to the northeast by Chenxi County, to the east and the south by Zhongfang County, and to the west by Zhijiang County. The district covers 722.8 km^{2} (279.1 sq mi). As of 2015, It had a registered population of 381,053 and a resident population of 607,900.

== Administrative divisions ==
Hecheng District has seven subdistricts, a town and two townships under its jurisdiction. The government seat is Tuoyuan (坨院街道).

7 subdistricts

- Chengzhong Subdistrict (城中街道)
- Chengbei Subdistrict (城北街道)
- Hongxing Subdistrict (红星街道)
- Yingfeng Subdistrict (迎丰街道)
- Tuoyuan Subdistrict (坨院街道)
- Hexi Subdistrict (河西街道)
- Chengnan Subdistrict (城南街道)

1 town

- Huangjin'ao Town (黄金坳镇)

2 townships

- Yingkou Township (盈口乡)
- Liangting'ao Township (凉亭坳乡)
