= Yongding =

Yongding (永定) may refer to:

- Yongding River, in Beijing
- Yongding District, Longyan, a district in Longyan, Fujian
- Yongding District, Zhangjiajie, a district in Zhangjiajie, Hunan
- Yongding Subdistrict, a subdistrict in Yongding District, Zhangjiajie

== Towns ==
- Yongding, Beijing, in Mentougou District, Beijing
- Yongding, Sichuan, in Nanbu County, Sichuan
- Yongding, Xinjiang, in Huocheng County, Xinjiang
- Yongding, Yunnan, in Fumin County, Yunnan
