= Wang Wenhua (host) =

Chinese television host

- 汪文华
- Born: 1954 (age 71–72); Baoding, Hebei, China
- Occupation: Host
- Years active: 1991–2011
- Television: China Central Television (CCTV)
- Political party: Chinese Communist Party
- Spouse: Wang Jianning

Chinese name
- Traditional Chinese: 汪文華
- Simplified Chinese: 汪文华
Transcriptions
Standard Mandarin
- Hanyu Pinyin: Wāng Wénhuá

Wang Wenhua (Chinese: 汪文华; born 1954) is a retired Chinese host.

== Biography ==
Wang was born in Baoding, Hebei, in 1954. She was conscripted into the People's Liberation Army in 1974, during the late Cultural Revolution. Wang worked as a drama actress and announcer in Wuhan Military District before entering the Art Troupe of Political Department of the People's Liberation Army Air Force. Wang entered the television industry in 1982 and she was transferred to the China Central Television (CCTV) in 1991. Her big break came in 1991 when she was host of a Chinese traditional culture program called The Best of Folk Arts.

== Personal life ==
Wang was married to Wang Jianning (Chinese: 王建宁).
