= Zhijiang Town =

Town in Hunan, China

Zhijiang 芷江镇
- Town
- Location in Hunan
- Coordinates: 27°26′12″N 109°40′41″E
- Country: People's Republic of China
- Province: Hunan
- Prefecture-level city: Huaihua
- Autonomous county: Zhijiang Dong Autonomous County
- Time zone: UTC+8 (China Standard)

Zhijiang Town (Chinese: 芷江镇; pinyin: Zhǐjiāng Zhèn) is a town and the county seat of Zhijiang Dong Autonomous County in Hunan, China. The town is located in the middle east of the county. It was reformed to merge Mayingtang Township (Chinese: 麻缨塘乡), Zhupingpu Township (Chinese: 竹坪铺乡), Aitouping Township (Chinese: 艾头坪乡) and the former Zhijiang Town on November 25, 2015. It has an area of 268.62 km^{2} (103.71 sq mi) with a population of 156,200 (as of 2015 end). The town has 40 villages and 12 communities under its jurisdiction. Its seat of local government is at Qianjie Community (Chinese: 前街社区).

== Administrative divisions ==
Administrative Divisions of Zhijiang Town
villages or communities		former jurisdiction of towns and townships in 2015			
villages or communities		former names of villages or communities		former townships or towns	
English	Chinese	English	Chinese	English	Chinese
Aitouping Village	艾头坪村	Aitouping Village	艾头坪村	Aitouping Township	艾头坪乡
Hujiatou Village	胡家头村	Hujiatou Village	胡家头村	Aitouping Township	艾头坪乡
Liangtoutian Village	两头田村	Liangtoutian Village	两头田村	Aitouping Township	艾头坪乡
Longkou Village	垅口村	Longkou Village	垅口村	Aitouping Township	艾头坪乡
Qiliqiao Village	七里桥村	Chenjialong Village	陈家垅村	Aitouping Township	艾头坪乡
Qiliqiao Village	七里桥村	Qiliqiao Village	七里桥村	Zhijiang Town	芷江镇
Tangjiaqiao Village	塘家桥村	Tangjiaqiao Village	塘家桥村	Aitouping Township	艾头坪乡
Tangjiaqiao Village	塘家桥村	Tangjiawan Village	汤家湾村	Aitouping Township	艾头坪乡
Yangjia Village	杨家村	Yangjia Village	杨家村	Aitouping Township	艾头坪乡
Baixiping Village	白溪坪村	Baixiping Village	白溪坪村	Mayingtang Township	麻缨塘乡
Gaochong Village	高冲村	Gaochong Village	高冲村	Mayingtang Township	麻缨塘乡
Huangtanqiao Village	黄潭桥村	Huangtanqiao Village	黄潭桥村	Mayingtang Township	麻缨塘乡
Huangtanqiao Village	黄潭桥村	Juecaixi Village	蕨菜溪村	Mayingtang Township	麻缨塘乡
Mayingtang Village	麻缨塘村	Mayingtang Village	麻缨塘村	Mayingtang Township	麻缨塘乡
Qiaobian Village	桥边村	Qiaobian Village	桥边村	Mayingtang Township	麻缨塘乡
Shaping Village	沙坪村	Shaping Village	沙坪村	Mayingtang Township	麻缨塘乡
Shaxi Village	沙溪村	Shaxi Village	沙溪村	Mayingtang Township	麻缨塘乡
Taishang Village	台上村	Taishang Village	台上村	Mayingtang Township	麻缨塘乡
Wanggongpo Village	王公坡村	Taoxi Village	桃溪村	Mayingtang Township	麻缨塘乡
Wanggongpo Village	王公坡村	Wanggongpo Village	王公坡村	Mayingtang Township	麻缨塘乡
Xueping Village	学坪村	Xueping Village	学坪村	Mayingtang Township	麻缨塘乡
Xueping Village	学坪村	Yangloupo Village	羊楼坡村	Mayingtang Township	麻缨塘乡
Zhouping Village	周坪村	Zhouping Village	周坪村	Mayingtang Township	麻缨塘乡
Beijie Community	北街社区	Beijie Community	北街社区	Zhijiang Town	芷江镇
Dongjie Community	东街社区	Dongjie Community	东街社区	Zhijiang Town	芷江镇
Hepinglu Community	和平路社区	Hepinglu Community	和平路社区	Zhijiang Town	芷江镇
Huangjaijie Community	黄甲街社区	Huangjaijie Community	黄甲街社区	Zhijiang Town	芷江镇
Kaixuanlu Community	凯旋路社区	Kaixuanlu Community	凯旋路社区	Zhijiang Town	芷江镇
Nanjie Community	南街社区	Nanjie Community	南街社区	Zhijiang Town	芷江镇
Qianjie Community	前街社区	Qianjie Community	前街社区	Zhijiang Town	芷江镇
Dalongping Village	大垅坪村	Dalongping Village	大垅坪村	Zhijiang Town	芷江镇
Dengjiaping Village	邓家坪村	Dengjiaping Village	邓家坪村	Zhijiang Town	芷江镇
Dongmenkou Village	东门口村	Dongmenkou Village	东门口村	Zhijiang Town	芷江镇
Hexin Village	合心村	Hexin Village	合心村	Zhijiang Town	芷江镇
Liushuping Village	柳树坪村	Liushuping Village	柳树坪村	Zhijiang Town	芷江镇
Luojiajing Village	洛家井村	Luojiajing Village	洛家井村	Zhijiang Town	芷江镇
Quxilong Village	曲溪垅村	Quxilong Village	曲溪垅村	Zhijiang Town	芷江镇
Sanliping Village	三里坪村	Sanliping Village	三里坪村	Zhijiang Town	芷江镇
Shetangping Village	社塘坪村	Shetangping Village	社塘坪村	Zhijiang Town	芷江镇
Xiacaiyuan Village	下菜园村	Xiacaiyuan Village	下菜园村	Zhijiang Town	芷江镇
Xiaoxi Village	小溪村	Xiaoxi Village	小溪村	Zhijiang Town	芷江镇
Yaowantang Village	窑湾塘村	Shiwanping Village	十万坪村	Zhijiang Town	芷江镇
Yaowantang Village	窑湾塘村	Yaowantang Village	窑湾塘村	Zhijiang Town	芷江镇
Zhongyangxi Village	中央溪村	Zhongyangxi Village	中央溪村	Zhijiang Town	芷江镇
Changfeng'ao Village	畅风坳村	Changfeng'ao Village	畅风坳村	Zhupuping Township	竹坪铺乡
Mahuangtang Village	蚂蝗塘村	Mahuangtang Village	蚂蝗塘村	Zhupuping Township	竹坪铺乡
Shawan Village	沙湾村	Shawan Village	沙湾村	Zhupuping Township	竹坪铺乡
Taohuaxi Village	桃花溪村	Luping Village	炉坪村	Zhupuping Township	竹坪铺乡
Taohuaxi Village	桃花溪村	Pangzhuxi Village	傍竹溪村	Zhupuping Township	竹坪铺乡
Taohuaxi Village	桃花溪村	Taohuaxi Village	桃花溪村	Zhijiang Town	芷江镇
Wugongpo Village	蜈蚣坡村	Wugongpo Village	蜈蚣坡村	Zhupuping Township	竹坪铺乡
Wulipai Village	五里牌村	Wulipai Village	五里牌村	Zhupuping Township	竹坪铺乡
Zhupingpu Village	竹坪铺村	Miaoxi Village	苗溪村	Zhupuping Township	竹坪铺乡
Zhupingpu Village	竹坪铺村	Zhupingpu Village	竹坪铺村	Zhupuping Township	竹坪铺乡
Xiaohekou Village	小河口村	Xiaohekou Village	小河口村	Yanqiao Township	岩桥乡
Sifangyuan Village	四方园村	Sifangyuan Village	四方园村	Yanqiao Township	岩桥乡
