= Wang Wenhua (politician) =

Chinese politician (born 1969)

- 王文华

Chairperson of Qingdao Municipal People's Congress
- In office March 2012 – April 2017
- Preceded by: Zhang Ruofei
- Succeeded by: Song Yuanfang

Personal details
- Born: October 1957 (age 68–69) Linfen, Shanxi, China
- Party: Chinese Communist Party
- Education: Beijing Zhongnanhai Amateur University

Wang Wenhua (Chinese: 王文华; born October 1957) is a former Chinese politician, who served as the chairperson of Qingdao Municipal People's Congress from 2012 to 2017.

== Career ==
Wang was born in Linfen, Shanxi. He served as the member of the Party Committee and secretary of the Communist Youth League Committee of the General Office of the Chinese Communist Party, the chief of the Party Committee Office, the chief of the General Office of the Chinese Communist Party, the director-general level cadre of the Party Committee of the National Committee of the Chinese People's Political Consultative Conference, and the deputy secretary of the Party Committee of the National Committee of the CPPCC. He also served as the secretary of Li Ruihuan, the chairperson of the CPPCC at that time.

In May 2005, Wang was served as the deputy party secretary of Qingdao. In March 2012, he was appointed as the chairperson of Qingdao Municipal People's Congress. The mayor of Qingdao is Zhang Xinqi when Wang was the chairperson.

Wang was retired in April 2017. Later, he served as the vice president of China International Transnational Corporation Promotion Association.

== Investigation ==
On 18 December 2025, Wang was put under investigation for alleged "serious violations of discipline and laws" by the Central Commission for Discipline Inspection (CCDI), the party's internal disciplinary body, and the National Supervisory Commission, the highest anti-corruption agency of China.
