= Takeo Imai =

Japanese soldier (1898–1982)

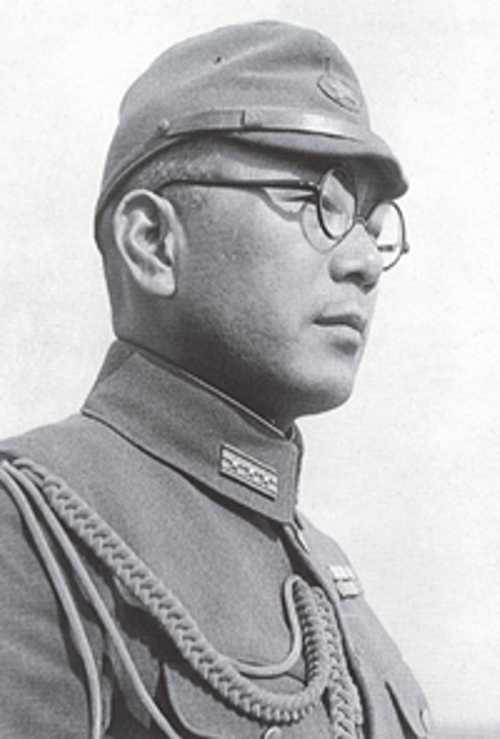
- Native name: 今井 武夫
- Born: February 23, 1898; Nagano Prefecture, Japan
- Died: June 12, 1982 (aged 84)
- Allegiance: Empire of Japan
- Branch: Imperial Japanese Army
- Service years: 1918–1947
- Rank: Major General
- Commands: Vice-Chief of General Staff, China Expeditionary Army
- Conflicts: Second Sino-Japanese War; Marco Polo Bridge Incident; World War II; Philippines campaign
- Education: Nagano Junior High School 1915; Imperial Japanese Army Academy 1918
- Spouse: Kimiko
- Children: 5

Takeo Imai (今井 武夫; 23 February 1898 – 12 June 1982) was a Japanese Major General of the China Expeditionary Army who was born in Nagano Prefecture. He played a notable role during the Second Sino-Japanese War and the Japanese invasion of the Philippines during World War II. During the Bataan Death March, he freed prisoners as the orders violated his Bushido code.

He served as a Vice-Chief of the General Staff of the China Expeditionary Army, as well as worked for the Japanese embassy in Beiping following the Marco Polo Bridge Incident. In this role he met with Chinese officers at Chichiang to negotiate surrender. Taking on important military roles in China and the Philippines, he was a significant actor throughout Japan's invasion of China and held an important role in negotiating and maintaining peace between the two countries. He was particularly influential in his responsibility of postwar processing and allowing for smooth demobilization transitions. He retired in 1947.

== Education and family ==
Imai was the fourth and youngest son in the family, with five other siblings.

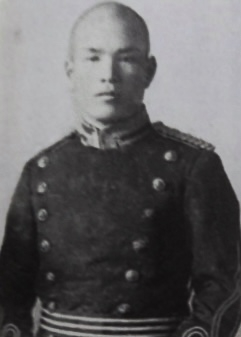
Imai during his time at the Army War College, 1926

He attended Jinjou Elementary School, Nagano Junior High School in 1915 and the Imperial Japanese Army Academy in 1918 and graduated from Army War College in 1928. He first worked as an infantry soldier in Toyoma before joining the infantry regiment in Hoeryong, Korea.

Takeo Imai's eldest son Hiroshi died of white blood disease at 6 and his second son Nobuo died due to subarachnoid hemorrhage at 17. His second daughter Takako died on June 12, 1982. He had three sons and two daughters.

== Military ==
Imai was a military official of a respected rank. According to historians, Imai was best known for taking a peaceful and mediating stance in Japan and China's conflictual relations in the late 1930s into the mid-1940s. He kept influential posts, from belonging to the Toyoma Infantry 69th Regiment as the position of Army Captain and Japan's invasion of China until its signing of the Surrender Instrument in August 1945.

Imai's primary military involvements were peace-keeping in the Sino-Japanese war, although he spent a year fighting in the Philippines for the start of the Pacific War.

In December 1935, Imai was based at the Japanese Embassy in Beijing, and his first major undertaking was the Marco Polo Bridge Incident, in which he played a key role in peace negotiations.

=== China ===
On July 7, 1937, Imai was a major player in the Marco Polo Incident near Beijing. This war represented the National Revolutionary Army of China and the Imperial Army of Japan. As a non-expansionist, his goal was to negotiate with Chinese leaders. He established a short-lived ceasefire, which was a recurring event throughout these Chinese and Japanese negotiations until Japanese Prime Minister Fumimaro Konoe's Cabinet decided to send troops into mainland China a few days later. At this point, the ceasefire was broken and the Second Sino-Japanese War began.

During this time, Imai was assigned intelligence expert for Japan's military. He gathered information regarding China's efforts and plans well after the Marco Polo Incident.

From late 1937 and into 1939, wherein he was promoted to Colonel, he would meet with Chinese ambassadors to negotiate peace relations.

On November 3, 1938, Japanese officials, among whom Takeo Imai was a part, were chosen to engage in talks with officials in China with regards to Japan's invasion of China. These officials would not represent Japan in these talks but identified solely under their own name to protect Japan's intentions and stature. By this time, Japan was in control of Hong Kong, Shanghai and multiple other powerful cities and harbours. Due to this, China hoped that Japan was coming to the end of their invasions, but six negotiations between the two states followed without an overall consensus.

In early March 1940, after a string of both official and unofficial negotiations between Chinese and Japanese officials, Imai laid out Chinese demands in Hong Kong. He made five conditions for peace-enablement, which are as follows:

- China ceases anti-Japanese policies and initiatives
- Acknowledgement of Manchuria state
- Make conclusive agreements with defence policies between Sino-Japanese relations
- Permitted Japanese base and presence in China
- Mongolia becomes a region of special administration

=== The Philippines ===
In August 1942, Imai took his troops to invade the Philippines, remaining there until August 31, 1943. During the Bataan Death March Imai was ordered to shoot 1000 US and Filipino prisoners of war who had surrendered on the Bataan Peninsula. The order was commissioned by Chief of Staff Masanobu Tsuji. Imai refused to carry out the order.

The Japanese were seeing increasing losses in their battles by 1944. Imai was sent to Nanking, China, in an attempt to reach a peace agreement with the Chinese Nationalist government.

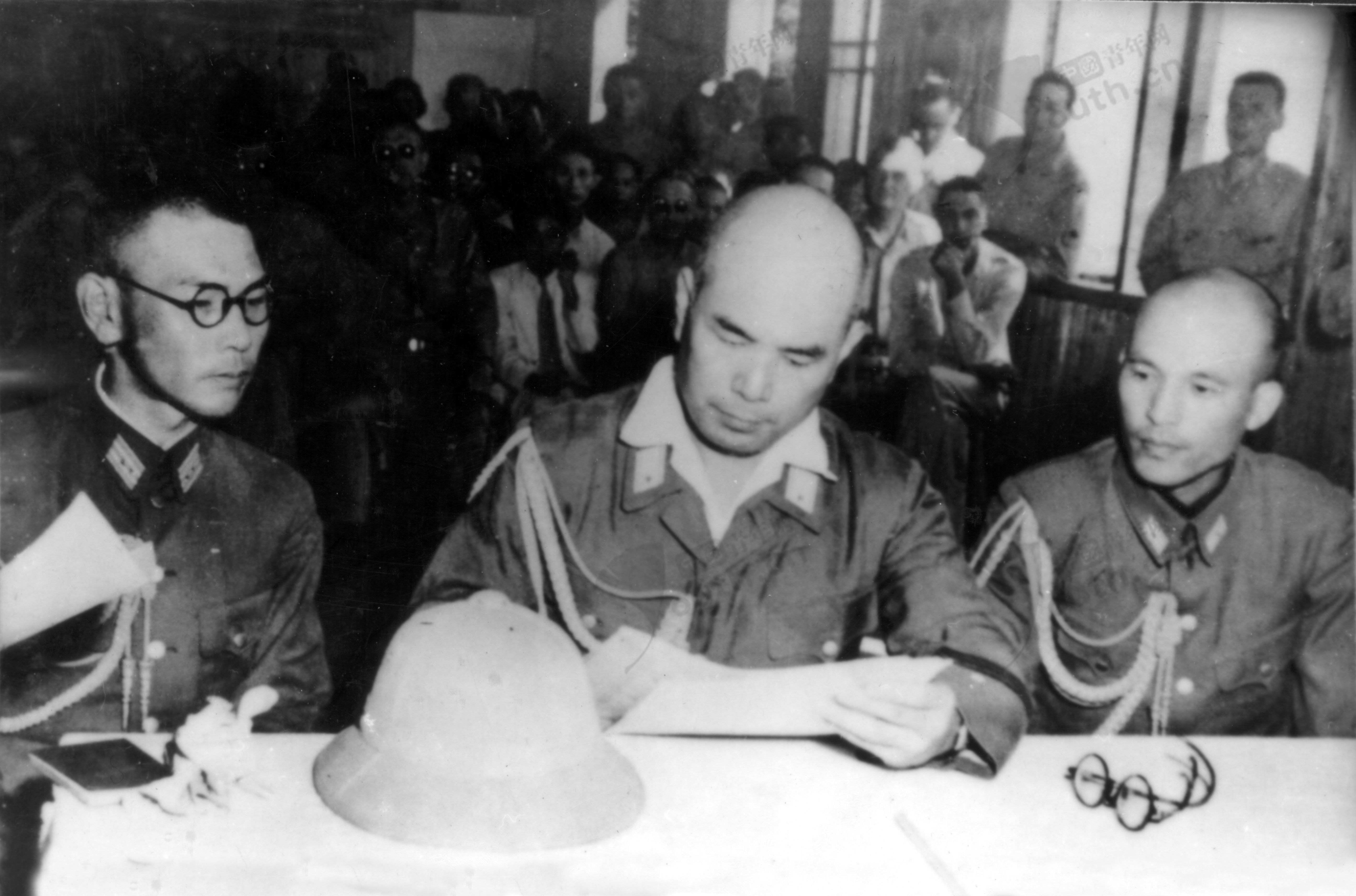
Imai (middle) signing a document during the surrender of Japan to the Allies in 1945

On the 15th August 1945, Japan surrendered to the Allies. Representing Japan, Imai travelled to Hunan province to officially surrender.

== Retirement and death ==
In August 1945, (Showa 20), after the Japanese government accepted the Potsdam Declaration of the Allied Forces, under the direction of the commander of the China Expeditionary Army, Yasuji Okamura, Hunan was designated by the Chinese side for preliminary negotiations at the end of the war on August 21. He went to the land of Shikou, in the province, and negotiated a stoppage of the China Expeditionary Army with the commanders of the Chinese army, He Yingqin. Immediately after the reception ceremony of the China Expeditionary Army held in Nanjing on September 9, Imai, who was clearly stated by He Yingqin that "Imai is not a war criminal," remained in Nanjing for about a year and a half, and became the head of the general liaison team in Japan. Major General Imai is one of the representatives of the Army, “Chiang Kei-Shek”, and is known for Wang Jingwei and direct peace work with the Chongqing National Government. He was engaged in the reinstatement of military generals and the support activities of those who were designated as war criminals by the Chinese side, and cleaned up after the Sino-Japanese War.

Takeo Imai remained in Nanjing for a period of time after the end of the war. His position at the time was as Vice-Chief of the China Expeditionary Army; working in external affairs and postwar processing as a representative of Japan. He was demobilised in January 1947, when he returned to Japan and remained there until his death in June 1982 (84 years old). According to researchers, Imai's memoir played an important record of the secret, unofficial negotiations between China and Japan as no official records of those negotiations were kept.

== Bibliography ==
- Cheng, Z. 2020. ‘How Can There Be “Not Expansion”. The Nanjing Massacre and Sino-Japanese Relations’. Palgrave Macmillan, Singapore.
- Hunter Boyle, John. The Road to Sino-Japanese Collaboration. The Background to the Defection of Wang Ching-Wei. Monummenta Nipponica. Vol. 25, No. 3/4 (1970), pp. 267–301 (35 pages). Sophia University.
- Shobo, Misuzu. 2009. "Nichikakuhei Kaku Recollection and Testimony 1937-1947" Supervised by Hisashi Takahashi and Sadao Imai
- Shaoxiang, Yan. 2012. “The Basis of Ancient History: From Affairs of State to the Life of Ordinary People,” [In Chinese] Historical Research, no. 1 (February 2012), abstract in History and Theory 51, no. 3. 477
- Imai, Takeo. Takahashi Hisashi. Sadao Imai. “日中和平工作 回想と証言: Nikkeihei Work Recollection and Testimony 1937-1947,” abstract.
- 王琴. "和谈诱降的"谋略专家":今井武夫." 党史纵览 no. 1 (2005): 44.
- 杨奎松. "蒋介石抗日态度之研究——以抗战前期中日秘密交涉为例." Kang Ri Zhan Zheng Yan Jiu no. 4 (2000): 54–95.
- 日中和平工作の記録 (今井武夫と汪兆銘・蔣介石) Record of peace reinforcement Japan/China relations.
