= Zhongfang Town =

Town in Zhongfang County, Hunan, China

Zhongfang 中方镇
- Town
- Location in Hunan
- Coordinates: 27°25′14″N 109°56′27″E
- Country: People's Republic of China
- Province: Hunan
- Prefecture-level city: Huaihua
- County: Zhongfang County
- Time zone: UTC+8 (China Standard)

Zhongfang Town (Chinese: 中方镇; pinyin: Zhōngfāng Zhèn) is a town and the county seat of Zhongfang County in Hunan, China. The town is located in the southwest of the county. It was reformed to merge with Luting'ao Township (Chinese: 炉亭坳乡), Pailou Town (Chinese: 牌楼镇) and the former Zhongfang Town on November 24, 2015. It has an area of 288.2 km^{2} (111.3 sq mi) with a population of 58,400 (as of 2015). Its seat of local government is at Longjing Village (Chinese: 龙井村).
