= Zhongfang County =

Zhongfang County 中方县
- County
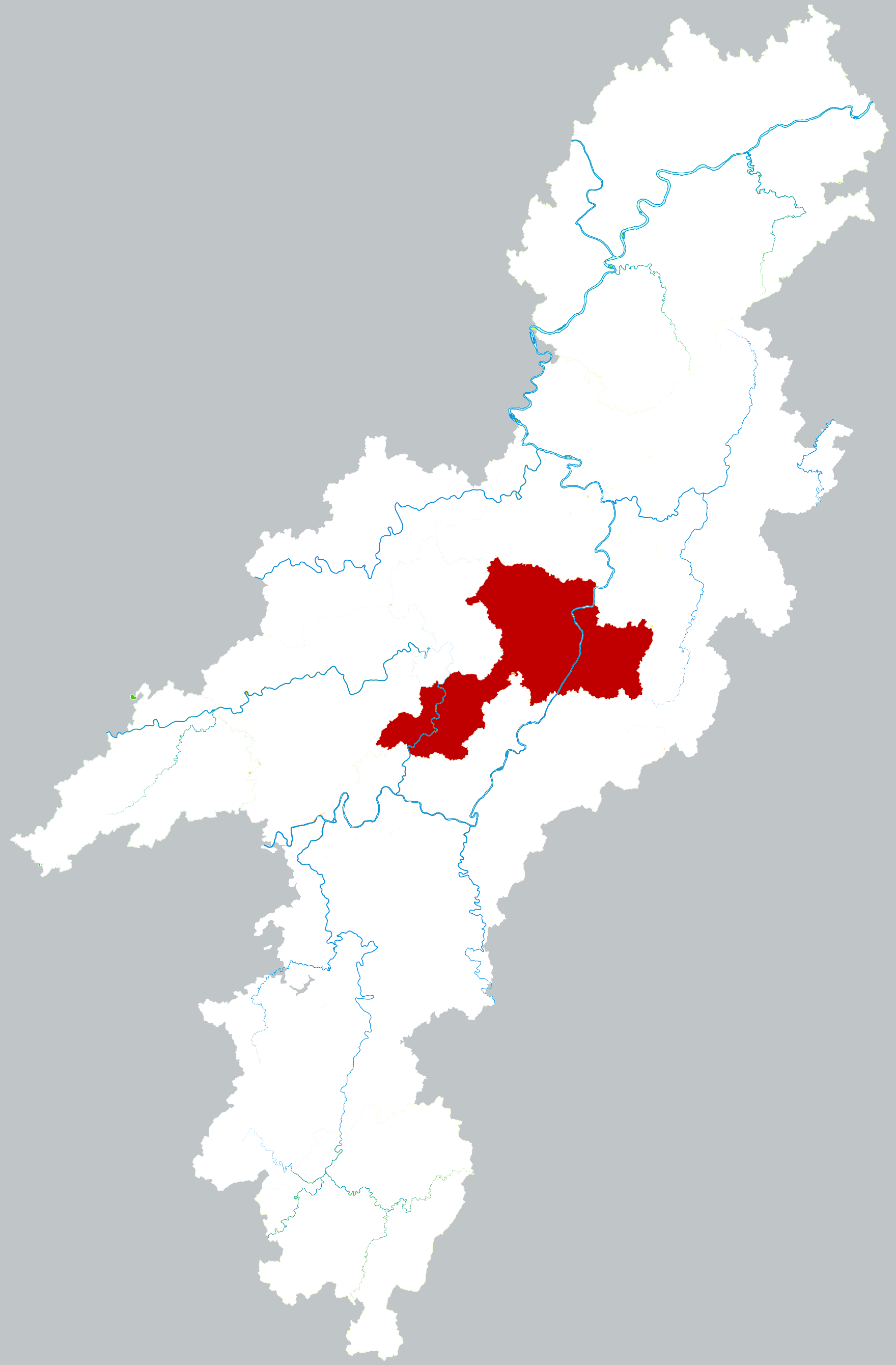
- Location of Zhongfang County within Huaihua

- Location in Hunan
- Coordinates: 27°26′46″N 109°57′18″E
- Country: People's Republic of China
- Province: Hunan
- Prefecture-level city: Huaihua

Area
  - Total: 1,466.54 km^{2} (566.23 sq mi)

Population (2010)
  - Total: 236,649
  - Density: 161.366/km^{2} (417.935/sq mi)
- Time zone: UTC+8 (China Standard)

Zhongfang County (simplified Chinese: 中方县; traditional Chinese: 中方縣; pinyin: Zhōngfāng Xiàn) is a county of Hunan Province, China. It is under the administration of the prefecture-level city of Huaihua.

Located on the west of the province, Zhongfang County is proximately to the city proper of Huaihua. The Yuan River flows through its east part south to north, Wu River runs through its west part north to south. The county is bordered to the northwest by Hecheng District, to the north by Chenxi County, to the east by Xupu County, to the south by Hongjiang City, and to the west by Zhijiang County. Zhongfang County covers an area of 1,515.4 km^{2} (585.1 sq mi), and as of 2015, it had a registered population of 289,054 and a resident population of 242,800. Zhongfang County has 11 towns and a township under its jurisdiction, and the county seat is Zhongfang Town (中方镇).
