= Zhijiang Dong Autonomous County =

Zhijiang County 芷江县 Chihkiang; Yuanchow; Yüanchow
- Autonomous county
- 芷江侗族自治县; Zhijiang Dong Autonomous County
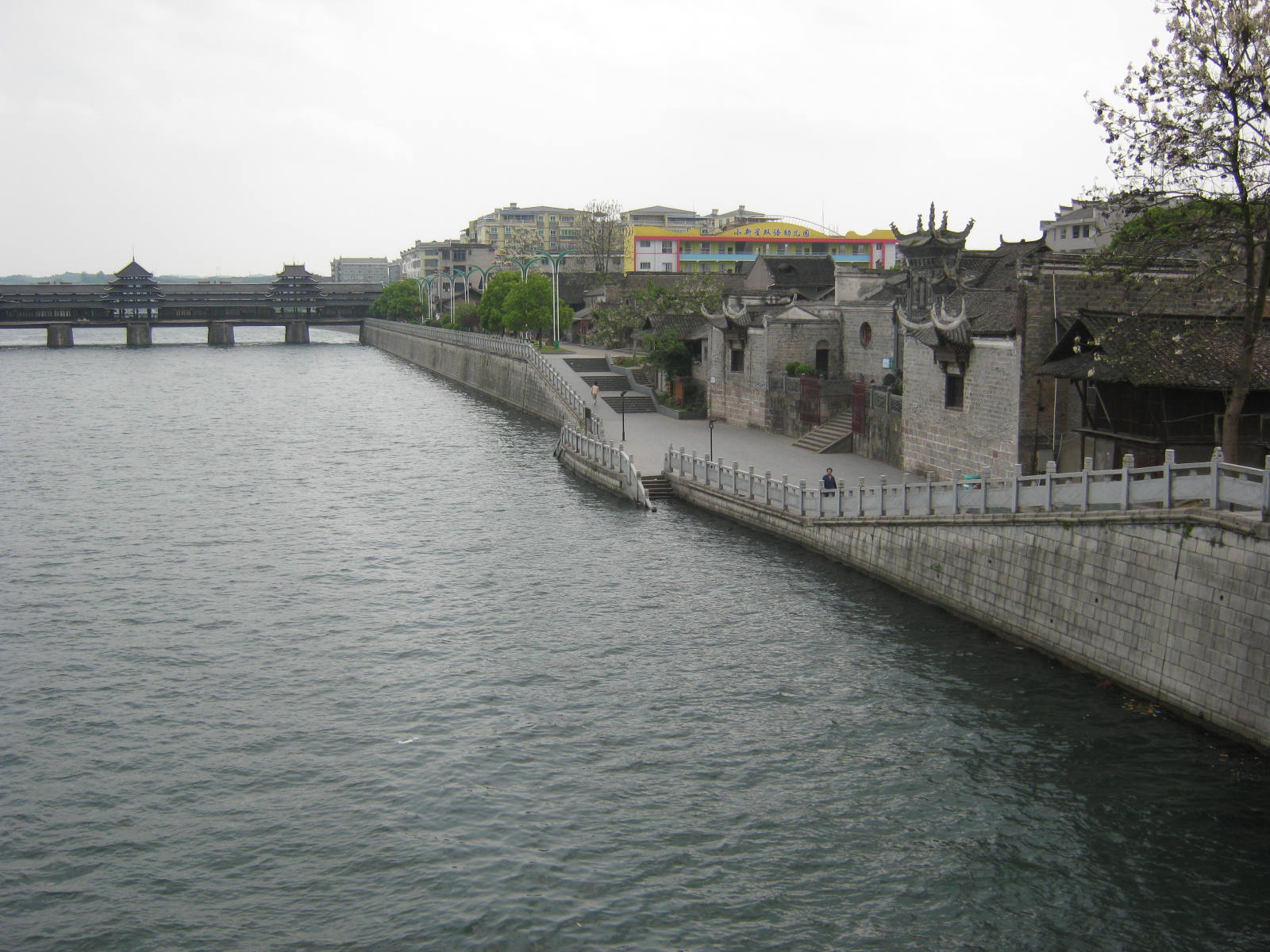

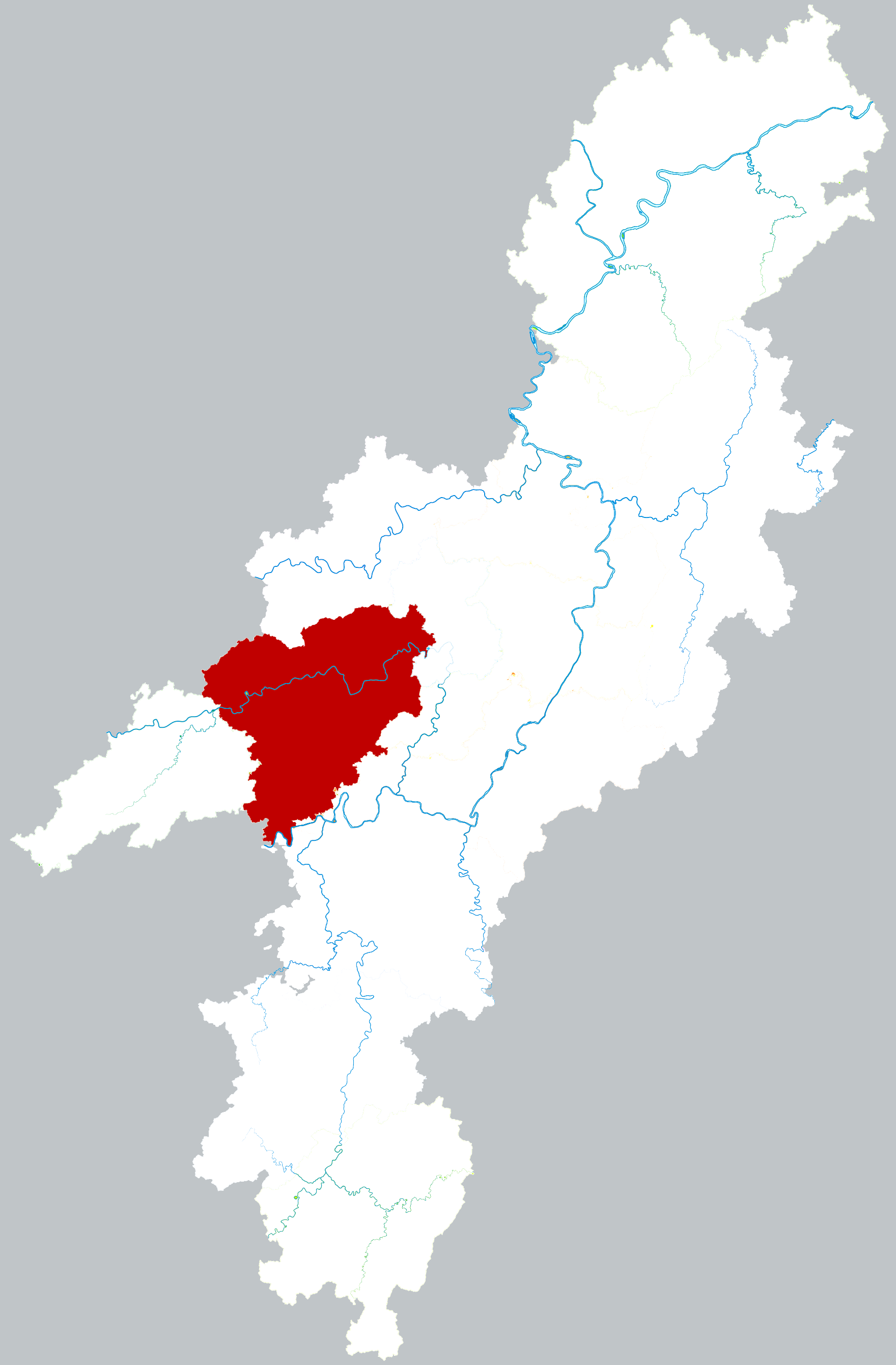
- Location of Zhijiang Dong Autonomous County within Huaihua

- Location in Hunan
- Coordinates: 27°26′42″N 109°41′06″E
- Country: People's Republic of China
- Province: Hunan
- Prefecture-level city: Huaihua
- County seat: Zhijiang Town

Area
  - Total: 2,095.53 km^{2} (809.09 sq mi)

Population (2010)
  - Total: 339,437
  - Density: 161.981/km^{2} (419.530/sq mi)
- Time zone: UTC+8 (China Standard)
- Postal code: 4191XX
- Area code: 0745

Zhijiang
- Chinese: 芷江
- Postal: Chihkiang
Transcriptions
Standard Mandarin
- Hanyu Pinyin: Zhǐjiāng
- Wade–Giles: Chih^{3}-chiang^{1}

Zhijiang Dong Autonomous County
- Traditional Chinese: 芷江侗族自治縣
- Simplified Chinese: 芷江侗族自治县
- Postal: Chihkiang Tung Autonomous County
Transcriptions
Standard Mandarin
- Hanyu Pinyin: Zhǐjiāng Dòngzú Zìzhìxiàn
- Wade–Giles: Chih^{3}-chiang^{1} Tung^{4}-tsu^{2} Tzu^{4}-chih^{4}-hsien^{4}

Zhijiang Dong Autonomous County (Chinese: 芷江侗族自治县), usually referred to as Zhijiang County (simplified Chinese: 芷江县; traditional Chinese: 芷江縣; pinyin: Zhǐjiāng Xiàn) (Dong language: Zix jangh) is an autonomous county of the Dong people in Hunan Province, China. It is under the administration of Huaihua prefecture-level city.

Zhijiang is located on the west central margin of Hunan Province, immediately adjacent to the east border of Guizhou Province. It borders Bijiang and Wanshan Districts of Tongren, Guizhou to the northwest, Mayang County to the north, Hecheng District of Huaihua and Zhongfang County to the east, Hongjiang City and Huitong County to the southeast, Tianzhu County of Guizhou to the southwest, Xinhuang County to the west. The county covers 2,099 km^{2} (810 sq mi), as of 2015, It had a registered population of about 383,000 and a resident population of 346,800. The county has nine towns and nine townships under its jurisdiction, the county seat is Zhijiang Town (芷江镇).

Zhijiang is the place that the first major Japanese surrender ceremony in China took place on August 21, 1945. The Japanese Vice General Secretary Takeo Imai (今井武夫) signed the surrounding treaty, marking the end of the Second Sino-Japanese War.

== Geography and climate ==
Zhijiang County is situated in western Hunan at the eastern end of the Yunnan–Guizhou Plateau, amongst the southern end of the Xuefeng and Wuling Mountains. It borders Xinhuang Dong Autonomous County and Guizhou's Wanshan District and Tianzhu County to the west, Huitong County and Hongjiang Administrative District to the south, Zhongfang County and Hecheng District to the east, and Mayang Miao Autonomous County to the north.

Zhijiang County has a humid subtropical climate (Köppen Cfa), with an annual mean temperature of 16.72 °C (62.1 °F). Winters are mild and brief, beginning somewhat dry and turning wet and gloomy as the season progresses. Spring is very rainy, especially in May, which is the wettest month. Summer is hot and humid (but tempered compared to much of the province), with moderate levels of rain, and generous sunshine; on average, July and August are the only two months where the area receives more than half of possible sunshine. Autumn is the driest season. From March to June, on average, more than half of the days each month receive some precipitation. The monthly 24-hour average temperature ranges from 5.0 °C (41.0 °F) in January to 27.2 °C (81.0 °F) in July. The annual precipitation is around 1,221 mm (48 in). With monthly percent possible sunshine ranging from 15% in February to 56% in August, the county receives 1,482 hours of sunshine annually.

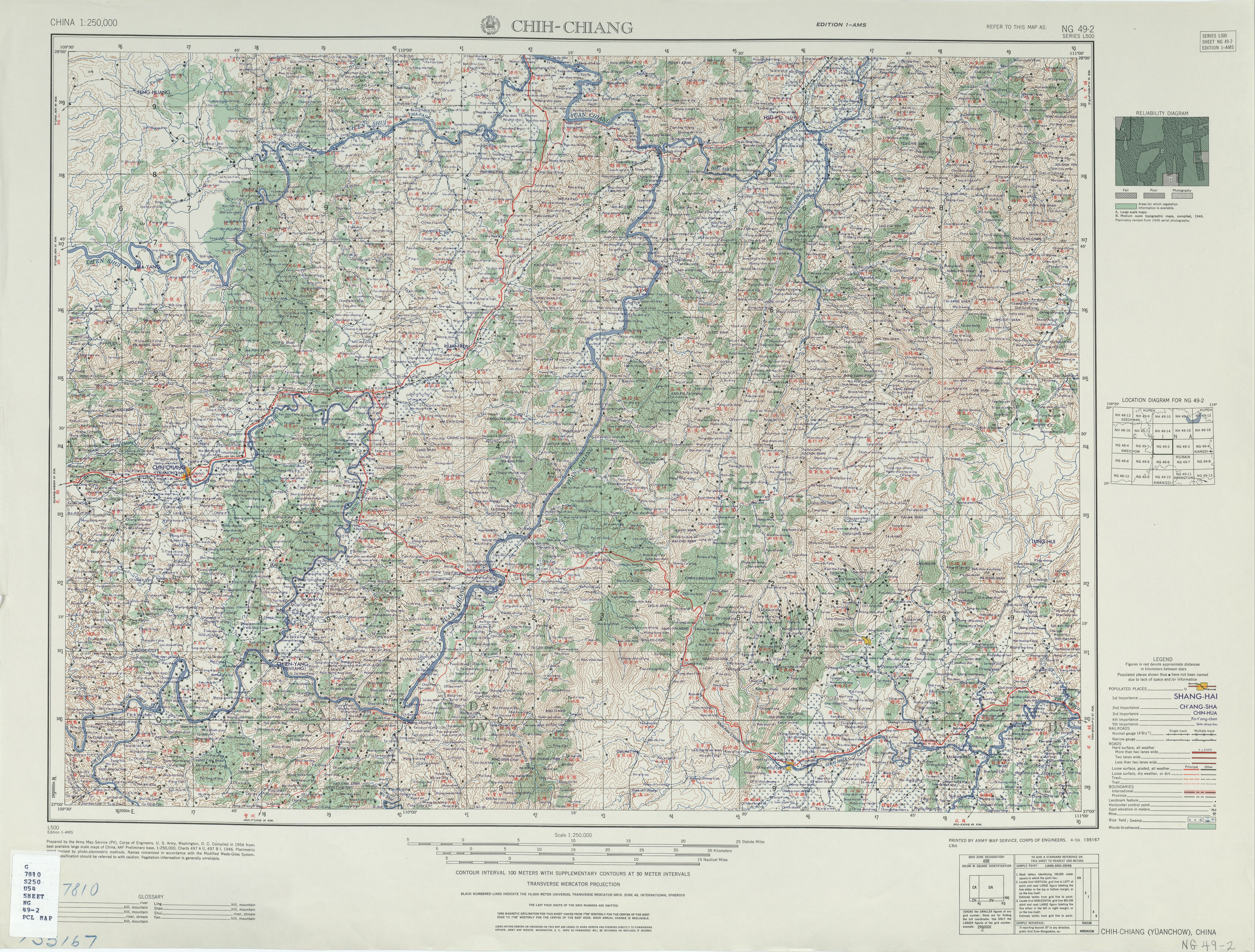
Map including Zhijiang (labeled as CHIH-CHIANG (YÜANCHOW) 芷江) (AMS, 1954)

Climate data for Zhijiang, elevation 272 m (892 ft), (1991–2020 normals, extremes 1981–2010)
Month	Jan	Feb	Mar	Apr	May	Jun	Jul	Aug	Sep	Oct	Nov	Dec	Year
Record high °C (°F)	25.7 (78.3)	29.8 (85.6)	34.8 (94.6)	34.2 (93.6)	35.2 (95.4)	37.3 (99.1)	38.3 (100.9)	39.4 (102.9)	38.3 (100.9)	35.8 (96.4)	30.6 (87.1)	24.3 (75.7)	39.4 (102.9)
Mean daily maximum °C (°F)	8.7 (47.7)	11.7 (53.1)	16.1 (61.0)	22.3 (72.1)	26.5 (79.7)	29.3 (84.7)	32.3 (90.1)	32.5 (90.5)	28.9 (84.0)	22.9 (73.2)	17.5 (63.5)	11.5 (52.7)	21.7 (71.0)
Daily mean °C (°F)	5.2 (41.4)	7.6 (45.7)	11.5 (52.7)	17.2 (63.0)	21.4 (70.5)	24.8 (76.6)	27.4 (81.3)	27.0 (80.6)	23.4 (74.1)	17.9 (64.2)	12.6 (54.7)	7.3 (45.1)	16.9 (62.5)
Mean daily minimum °C (°F)	2.9 (37.2)	4.9 (40.8)	8.4 (47.1)	13.7 (56.7)	17.9 (64.2)	21.7 (71.1)	23.7 (74.7)	23.2 (73.8)	19.7 (67.5)	14.7 (58.5)	9.4 (48.9)	4.5 (40.1)	13.7 (56.7)
Record low °C (°F)	−4.7 (23.5)	−4.4 (24.1)	−1.5 (29.3)	1.7 (35.1)	7.6 (45.7)	13.1 (55.6)	16.5 (61.7)	16.2 (61.2)	11.4 (52.5)	2.6 (36.7)	−1.2 (29.8)	−4.8 (23.4)	−4.8 (23.4)
Average precipitation mm (inches)	46.4 (1.83)	52.8 (2.08)	96.4 (3.80)	128.9 (5.07)	194.7 (7.67)	228.5 (9.00)	180.1 (7.09)	106.3 (4.19)	68.3 (2.69)	81.9 (3.22)	59.6 (2.35)	35.3 (1.39)	1,279.2 (50.38)
Average precipitation days (≥ 0.1 mm)	13.0	13.0	16.7	16.9	16.4	15.1	11.5	10.5	8.7	12.1	10.0	10.6	154.5
Average snowy days	4.1	2.7	0.6	0	0	0	0	0	0	0	0	1.6	9
Average relative humidity (%)	79	78	80	80	81	83	80	78	77	79	80	77	79
Mean monthly sunshine hours	46.3	53.0	72.1	99.3	121.4	120.4	204.5	209.8	153.7	108.8	91.8	71.2	1,352.3
Percentage possible sunshine	14	17	19	26	29	29	48	52	42	31	29	22	30
Source: China Meteorological Administration
