= List of lakes and reservoirs in Jingzhou Miao and Dong Autonomous County =

The following is a list of lakes and reservoirs in Jingzhou Miao and Dong Autonomous County, Hunan, China.

== List ==
| Location | English name | Chinese name | Surface area (km2) | Storage capacity (m3) | Notes |
|---|---|---|---|---|---|
| Quyang | Shuiniangtang Reservoir | 水酿塘水库 | 4,199 | 77,500,000 | |
| Quyang | Jinmai Reservoir | 金麦水库 | 59.6 | 14,450,000 | |
| Quyang | Ma'andong Reservoir | 马鞍洞水库 | 4,600 | 4,850,000 | |
| Quyang | Feishan Reservoir | 飞山水库 | 11.65 | 8,280,000 | |
| Quyang | Muxi Reservoir | 木溪水库 | 4.4 | 1,765,000 | |
| Quyang | Diyangchong Reservoir | 地央冲水库 | 5.34 | 4,200,000 | |
| Quyang | Hupiaodang Reservoir | 湖漂凼 | 1.8 | 1,050,000 | |
| Quyang | Dayouchong Reservoir | 大油冲水库 | 1.85 | 1,285,000 | |
| Quyang | Xinlepu Reservoir | 新乐铺水库 | 260 | 860,000 | |
| Quyang | Shatan Reservoir | 沙滩水库 | 11.3 | 200,000 | |
| Quyang | Xinchong Reservoir | 信冲水库 | 1.73 | 1,337,000 | |
| Quyang | Dawanchong Reservoir | 大湾冲水库 | 1.8 | 830,000 | |
| Quyang | Damaochong Reservoir | 大猫冲水库 | 0.39 | 120,000 | |
| Quyang | Zili Reservoir | 自力水库 | 0.5 | 181,000 | |
| Quyang | Banchong Reservoir | 半冲水库 | 0.62 | 216,600 | |
| Quyang | Heping Reservoir | 和平水库 | 0.74 | 420,000 | |
| Quyang | Tudiba Reservoir | 土地坝水库 | 0.51 | 170,000 | |
| Quyang | Goubajing Reservoir | 沟坝井 | 1.1 | 334,000 | |
| Quyang | Longjingping Reservoir | 龙井坪水库 | 1.21 | 655,800 | |
| Quyang | Suobiao Reservoir | 梭标水库 | 0.72 | 400,000 | |
| Quyang | Xuanwan Reservoir | 旋湾水库 | 1.8 | 300,000 | |
| Quyang | Niufengdui Reservoir | 牛峰堆水库 | 1.45 | 339,000 | |
| Quyang | Bajiaotang Reservoir | 八角塘水库 | 0.65 | 350,000 | |
| Quyang | Lantang Reservoir | 烂塘水库 | 0.25 | 136,000 | |
| Quyang | Chongmai Reservoir | 冲麦水库 | 0.54 | 140,000 | |
| Quyang | Shichong Reservoir | 石冲水库 | 1.46 | 440,300 | |
| Quyang | Pingkui Reservoir | 平魁水库 | 1.21 | 712,000 | |
| Paiyashan Forest Park | Miaochong Reservoir | 苗冲水库 | 0.73 | 158,000 | |
| Outuan Township | Nantuanba Reservoir | 南团坝水库 | 211.6 | 7,600,000 | |
| Outuan Township | Dilichong Reservoir | 地理冲水库 | 7.43 | 1,560,000 | |
| Xinchang | Dingdong Reservoir | 丁洞水库 | 6.13 | 1,188,400 | |
| Xinchang | Zhangjiachong Reservoir | 张家冲水库 | 2.12 | 409,500 | |
| Xinchang | Paochong Reservoir | 泡冲水库 | 1.23 | 130,000 | |
| Taiyangping Township | Zongchong Reservoir | 宗冲水库 | 1.8 | 1,200,000 | |
| Taiyangping Township | Luogua Reservoir | 落瓜水库 | 0.8 | 130,500 | |
| Taiyangping Township | Chalinxi Reservoir | 茶林溪水库 | 1.2 | 800,000 | |
| Taiyangping Township | Yangqiaochong Reservoir | 杨桥冲水库 | 1.82 | 216,000 | |
| Taiyangping Township | Longtou Reservoir | 垅头水库 | 0.21 | 140,000 | |
| Gantang | Diling Reservoir | 地灵水库 | 17.2 | 5,701,000 | |
| Gantang | Shuita'ao Reservoir | 水塔坳水库 | 12.6 | 2,580,000 | |
| Gantang | Tanchong Reservoir | 炭冲水库 | 1.3 | 1,110,000 | |
| Gantang | Tianchong Reservoir | 田冲水库 | 0.48 | 135,400 | |
| Gantang | Jiangjiachong Reservoir | 蒋家冲水库 | 1.28 | 295,000 | |
| Gantang | Qincaitang Reservoir | 芹菜塘水库 | 0.6 | 209,000 | |
| Gantang | Mengtang Reservoir | 蒙塘水库 | 0.5 | 78,000 | |
| Aoshang | Changganchong Reservoir | 长杆冲水库 | 2.03 | 1,360,000 | |
| Zhaiya Township | Moshi Reservoir | 磨石水库 | 228 | 770,000 | |
| Dabaozi | Baishuidong Reservoir | 白水洞水库 | 205 | 450,000 | |
| Pingcha | Santaqiao Reservoir | 三塔桥水库 | 60 | 170,000 | |
| Sanqiao Township | Shuichong Reservoir | 水冲水库 | 20 | 680,000 | |
