= Hmu language =

Hmongic language spoken in China

Hmu
- Qiandong Miao, Black Miao
- hveb Hmub
- Pronunciation: [m̥ʰū]
- Native to: China
- Region: mostly Guizhou
- Ethnicity: mostly Miao, some Yao
- Language family: Hmong–Mien: Hmongic; Core Hmongic; Hmu
- Standard forms: Standard Miao
- Writing system: Latin

Language codes
- ISO 639-3: Variously: hea – Northern hmq – Eastern hms – Southern neo – Ná-Meo
- Glottolog: east2369

The Hmu language (hveb Hmub), also known as Qiandong Miao (黔东, Eastern Guizhou Miao), Central Miao (中部苗语), East Hmongic (Ratliff 2010), or (somewhat ambiguously) Black Miao, is a dialect cluster of Hmongic languages of China. The best studied dialect is that of Yǎnghāo (养蒿) village, Taijiang County, Guizhou Province.

Qanu (咯努), a Hmu variety, had 11,450 speakers as of 2000, and is spoken just south of Kaili City, Guizhou. The Qanu are ethnoculturally distinct from the other Hmu.

== Names ==
Autonyms include m̥ʰu33 in Kaili, mo33 in Jinping County, mu13 in Tianzhu County, m̥ə33 in Huangping County, qa33 nəu13 in some parts of Qiandongnan (Miaoyu Jianzhi 苗语简志 1985), and ta11 mu11 in Rongshui Miao Autonomous County, Guangxi. Ná-Meo, spoken by the Mieu people of Cao Minh Commune, Tràng Định District, Lạng Sơn Province, Vietnam, may be closely related.

== Subdivisions and distribution ==
=== Wang (1985) ===
Wang Fushi (1985) groups the Qiandong Miao languages as follows.

- Northern: 1,000,000 speakers in Kaili, Majiang, Nandan, Longlin, Leishan, Taijiang, Huangping, Jianhe, Zhenyuan, Sansui, Shibing, Sandu, Fuquan, Pingba, Zhenning, Xingren, Zhenfeng, Anlong, Wangmo, etc.
- Eastern: 250,000 speakers in Jinping, Liping, Jianhe, Jingzhou, Tongdao, Huitong, etc.
- Southern: 350,000 speakers in Rongjiang, Congjiang, Nandan, Sandu, Rongshui, Sanjiang, etc. Includes Na Meo of northern Vietnam.
- Western (Raojia): 15,000 speakers in Heba of Majiang, Mianluo of Duyun, Sandu, Rongjiang, parts of Nandan

=== Wu (2009) ===
Wu Zhengbiao (2009) divides Hmu into seven different dialects. Past classifications usually included only three or four dialects. For example, Li Jinping & Li Tianyi (2012), based on past classifications, divide Hmu into the three dialects of Northern, Southern, and Eastern. Datapoint locations of representative dialects are from Li Yunbing (2000).

- Eastern (Representative dialect: Sanjiang township 三江乡, Jinping County, Guizhou)
  - Jinping County, Guizhou (in Ouli 偶里寨 of Ouli Township 偶里乡, etc.)
    - Hekou 河口 dialect (10,000+ speakers): spoken in Hekou 河口乡, Wenniu 文牛乡, and Zhanghua 彰化乡 townships
    - Ouli 偶里 dialect (20,000+ speakers): spoken in Pinglve 平略乡, Ouli 偶里乡, Zhaizao 寨早乡, Jiaosan 皎三乡, Maoping 茅坪乡, Guazhi 挂治乡, Pingjin 平金乡, and Suijiang 稳江乡, Loujiang 娄江乡, and Tongpo 铜坡乡 townships
    - Yuhe 裕河 dialect (about 3,000 speakers): spoken in Yuhe 裕河乡, Xinmin 新民乡, and Guben 固本乡 townships
    - Sanqiao 三锹话
  - Jingzhou County, Hunan (in Caidiwan 菜地湾, etc.)
  - Huitong County, Hunan
- Northern (Representative dialect: Yanghao village 养蒿村, Guading town 挂丁镇, Kaili city, Guizhou)
  - Kaili (in Yanghao 养蒿 of Guading Township 挂丁镇, etc.)
  - Leishan County
  - Taijiang County
  - Shibing County
  - Gedong 革东镇 in Jianhe County
  - Huangping County
  - Fuquan County
  - Weng'an County
  - Xingren County
  - parts of Anlong County
  - Yangwu 杨武乡, Longquan 龙泉镇, Paidiao 排调镇, Xingren 兴仁镇 townships, and also parts of Yahui 雅灰乡 in Danzhai County
  - Duyun
    - Bagu Township 坝固镇: Jijia 鸡贾, Yanglie 羊列, Baduo 把朵, Metao 么陶
    - Wangsi Township 王司镇: Taohua 桃花, Xinchang 新场, Wulu 乌路, Wuzhai 五寨
    - Pu'an Township 普安镇: Zongjiang 总奖村, Guanghua 光华村, Xingfu 幸福村
- Northeastern
  - Zhaitou 寨头村, Baye 巴冶村, and Liangshan 良上村 villages of Sansui County
  - Gaoyongzhai 高雍寨, Guanme Township 观么乡, Jianhe County
- Western (including Raojia; Representative dialect: Baixing village 白兴村, Heba township 河坝乡, Majiang County, Guizhou)
  - Heba Village 河坝村, Longshan Township 龙山乡, Majiang County
  - Raohe Village 绕河村, Luobang Township 洛邦乡, Duyun (also in Pingzhai 坪寨 of Wu'ai Village 五爱村)
- Southern (Representative dialect: Yangpai village 羊排村, Yangwu township 扬武乡, Danzhai County, Guizhou)
  - Sandu County: Lalan 拉揽乡 (in Paishaozhai 排烧寨, etc.), Jiaoli 交梨乡, Dujiang 都江镇 townships; Jialan 甲揽, Yangwu 羊吴, Dediao 的刁, Hongguang 红光, and Wuyun 巫匀 villages of Pu'an Township 普安镇
  - Danzhai County: Paidao 排岛 and Paimo 排莫 of Yahui Township 雅灰乡
- Southeastern 1 (Representative dialect: Datu village 大土村, Jiuqian township 九迁乡, Libo County, Guizhou)
  - Datu 大土村, Shuiwei 水维村, and Jialiao 甲料村 villages in Jiarong 佳荣镇 Township, Libo County
  - parts of Jiajiu 加鸠乡 Township, Congjiang County
  - Xunle Township 馴乐苗族乡, Huanjiang County
- Southeastern 2 (Representative dialect: Zhenmin 振民, Gongdong township 拱洞乡, Rongshui County, Guangxi)
  - Bingmei 丙妹镇, Tingdong 停洞乡, Cuili 翠里乡, and much of the Yueliangshan 月亮山 area in Congjiang County
  - Rongjiang County
  - Rongshui County (in Gunqinzhai 滚琴寨 of Dongtou Township 洞头乡, Yaogao 尧告, etc.)
  - Sanjiang County
  - Northern Vietnam (Lang Son, Cao Bang, Bac Kan, and Tuyen Quang provinces): Na Meo language

=== Hsiu (2018) ===
Andrew Hsiu (2018) proposes the following classification of the Qiandong Miao languages based on his 2015 computational analysis, classifying Ná-Meo as a Southern Qiandong Miao dialect:

- Qiandong Miao
  - North–East Qiandong Miao
    - East Qiandong Miao
    - North Qiandong Miao
  - South Qiandong Miao
  - West Qiandong Miao/Raojia

== Classification ==
Hmu has been recognized as a branch of Hmongic since the 1950s. Wang (1985) recognized three varieties. Matisoff (2001) treated these as distinct languages, which is reflected in Ethnologue. Lee (2000) added a fourth variety, Western Hmu (10,000 speakers), among the Yao, and Matisoff (2006) lists seven (Daigong, Kaili [N], Lushan, Taijiang [N], Zhenfeng [N], Phö, Rongjiang [S]).

== Writing ==
Northern Qiandong Miao, also known as Central Miao and as Eastern Guizhou Hmu (黔东方言 Qián-Dōng fāngyán), was chosen as the standard for Hmu-language textbooks in China, based on the pronunciation of Yǎnghāo (养蒿) village.

=== Alphabet ===
The Hmu alphabet is based on Pinyin and consists of 28 letters (all the 26 letters of the English alphabet with the addition of Gh and Kh).

Digraphs other than gh and kh and Trigraphs are not considered single letters and are considered combinations of letters.

The following list shows the 28 letters of the Hmu alphabet in their uppercase and lowercase forms along with their name and pronunciation in the IPA:

- A a (called a): /a/
- B b (ba): /p/
- C c (ca): /ʦʰ/
- D d (da): /t/ ~ /tʲ/
- E e (e): /ə/, /e/
- F f (fa): /f/
- G g (ga): /k/
- Gh gh (gha): /q/
- H h (ha): /h/
- I i (i): /i/
- J j (je): /ʨ/
- K k (ka): /kʰ/
- Kh kh (kha): /qʰ/
- L l (la): /l/, /ʎ/
- M m (ma): /m/
- N n (na): /n/, /ɲ/
- O o (o): /o/
- P p (pa): /pʰ/
- Q q (qe): /ʨʰ/
- R r (ra): /z/
- S s (sa): /ʂ/
- T t (ta): /tʰ/
- U u (u): /u/
- V v (va): /ɣ/
- W w (wa): /v/
- X x (xe): /ɕ/
- Y y (ye): /ʑ/, /j/
- Z z (za): /ʦ/

Digraphs:

- Ai ai: /ɛ/
- Au au: /ɑu/
- Dl dl: /ɬ/, /ɬʲ/
- Ei ei: /ei/
- En en: /en/, /in/
- Eu eu: /əu/
- Hf hf: /fʰ/
- Hl hl: /ɬʰ/, /ɬʰʲ/
- Hm hm: /mʰ/
- Hn hn: /nʰ/ ~ /ɲ̊ʰ/
- Hs hs: /sʰ/
- Hv hv: /xʰ/
- Hx hx: /ɕʰ/
- Ia ia: /iɑ/
- Ie ie: /ie/
- Io io: /io/
- Iu iu: /iu/
- Ng ng: /ŋ/
- Ua ua: /uɑ/
- Ue ue: /uɛ/

Trigraphs:

- Ang ang: /ɑŋ/
- Iau iau: /iɑu/
- Ieu: /iə/
- Ong ong: /oŋ/
- Uei uei: /uei/

Tones are marked with final consonant letters:

- Mid tone: b
- [˧˥/-̤˨]: d
- [˧˩/-̤˩˨/˨˩˧]: f
- [˥˧/˧˥]: k
- [-̤˩/˨˩/˧]: l
- [-̤˩˧/˥/-̤˨]: s
- [˦/˦˥]: t
- [˥~˦˥/˦˨/˥˧]: x
- Neutral tone / no tone: unmarked

There are no diacritics or accents in the Hmu alphabet, and only the letters of the ISO basic Latin alphabet are used.

== Phonology ==
The phonemic inventory and alphabetic transcription are as follows.

Northern Hmu consonants
		Labial	Alveolar	Palatalized alveolar	Velar	Uvular	Glottal
Nasal	voiced	m ⟨m⟩	n ⟨n⟩	nʲ ⟨ni⟩	ŋ ⟨ng⟩		
Nasal	aspirated	m̥ʰ ⟨hm⟩	n̥ʰ ⟨hn⟩	n̥ʲʰ ⟨hni⟩			
Plosive	tenuis	p ⟨b⟩	t ⟨d⟩	tʲ ⟨di⟩	k ⟨g⟩	q ⟨gh⟩	(ʔ)
Plosive	aspirated	pʰ ⟨p⟩	tʰ ⟨t⟩	tʲʰ ⟨ti⟩	kʰ ⟨k⟩	qʰ ⟨kh⟩	
Affricate	tenuis		ts ⟨z⟩	tɕ ⟨j⟩			
Affricate	aspirated		tsʰ ⟨c⟩	tɕʰ ⟨q⟩			
Median fricative	voiced	v ⟨w⟩	z ⟨r⟩	ʑ ⟨y⟩	ɣ ⟨v⟩		
Median fricative	tenuis	f ⟨f⟩	s ⟨s⟩	ɕ ⟨x⟩			h ⟨h⟩
Median fricative	aspirated	fʰ ⟨hf⟩	sʰ ⟨hs⟩	ɕʰ ⟨hx⟩	xʰ ⟨hv⟩		
Lateral fricative	tenuis		ɬ ⟨dl⟩	ɬʲ ⟨dli⟩			
Lateral fricative	aspirated		ɬʰ ⟨hl⟩	ɬʲʰ ⟨hli⟩			
Lateral approximant			l ⟨l⟩	lʲ ⟨li⟩			

[ʔ] is not distinct from a zero initial (that is, if we accept /ʔ/ as a consonant, there are no vowel-initial words in Hmu), and only occurs with tones 1, 3, 5, 7.

The aspirated nasals and fricatives do not exist in Southern or Eastern Hmu; cognates words use their unaspirated homologues. Further, in Eastern Hmu, di, ti merge into j, q; c merges into x; r (Northern /z/) merges into ni; and v is pronounced [w]. In Southern Hmu, words cognate with hni (and some with ni) are pronounced [nʲʑ]; those with r are [nz]; and some words exchange s and x.

Northern Hmu vowels
	Front		Central		Back	
	oral	nasal	oral	nasal	oral	nasal
Close	i ⟨i⟩				u ⟨u⟩	
Mid	ɛ ⟨ai⟩	en ⟨en⟩	ə ⟨e⟩		o ⟨o⟩	oŋ ⟨ong⟩
Open					ɑ ⟨a⟩	ɑŋ ⟨ang⟩

Ai /ɛ/ does not occur after palatalized consonants. /en/ after palatalized consonants is spelled in.

Diphthongs
	Closing
Close component is front	ej ⟨ei⟩
Close component is back	əw ⟨eu⟩

Additional diphthongs occur in Chinese loans.

All dialects have eight tones. There is no sandhi. In the chart below, Northern Hmu is represented by Yanghao village (Kaili City), Eastern Hmu by 偶里 village (Jinping County), and Southern Hmu by 振民 (Rongshui County).

Hmu tone
Tone	Letter	Northern	Eastern	Southern
1	b	˧ 3	˧ 3	˧ 3
3	d	˧˥ 35	˨̤ 2	˧˥ 35
5	t	˦ 4	˦˥ 45	˦ 4
7	k	˥˧ 53	˨˦ 24	˨˦ 24
2	x	˥ 5 ~ ˦˥ 45	˦˨ 42	˥˧ 53
4	l	˩̤ 1	˨˩ 21	˧˩ 31
6	s	˩˧̤ 13	˥ 5	˨̤ 2
8	f	˧˩ 31	˩˨̤ 12	˨˩˧ 213

The lowest tones—Northern tones 4 and 6, Eastern tones 3 and 8, and Southern tone 6—are said to make the preceding consonant murmured (breathy voiced), presumably meaning that these are murmured tones as in other Hmongic languages. They are marked with ⟨◌̤⟩ in the chart.

== Syntax ==
In referential phrase, the constituent order can be both head-last (due to Chinese influence) as well as head-first (indigenous).

to̤¹¹ qei³³ nen⁴⁴
PL chicken that
'those chickens'

ɣoŋ⁵⁵ ɬjhə³³ ɣoŋ⁵⁵ ʑu⁴⁴
dragon big dragon small
'big and small dragons'
