= Cao Minh (disambiguation) =

Cao Minh may refer to several places in Vietnam, including:

- Cao Minh, Thái Nguyên, a commune of Thái Nguyên province
- Cao Minh, Haiphong, a former rural commune of Vĩnh Bảo District
- Cao Minh, Vĩnh Phúc, a former rural commune of Phúc Yên
- Cao Minh, Lạng Sơn, a former rural commune of Tràng Định District
