= Pingcha =

Pingcha Town
- Town

Chinese transcription(s)
  - Simplified: 平茶镇
  - Traditional: 平茶鎮
  - Pinyin: Píngchá Zhèn
- Location in Hunan
- Coordinates: 26°20′56″N 109°22′45″E
- Country: China
- Province: Hunan
- Prefecture: Huaihua
- Autonomous county: Jingzhou Miao and Dong Autonomous County

Area
  - Total: 160 km^{2} (62 sq mi)

Population (2017)
  - Total: 11,000
  - Density: 69/km^{2} (180/sq mi)
- Time zone: UTC+8 (China Standard)
- Postal code: 418406
- Area code: 0745

Pingcha (Chinese: 平茶镇) is a rural town in Jingzhou Miao and Dong Autonomous County, Hunan, China. As of the 2017 census it had a population of 11,000 and an area of 160 square kilometres (62 sq mi). The town is bordered to the north by Outuan Township, to the east by Xinchang Town, to the south by Deshun Township, and to the west by Gaotun Subdistrict of Liping County.

== History ==
After the establishment of the Communist State in 1950, the Pingcha Township (Chinese: 平察乡) was set up. At that time, it was under the jurisdiction of Jinping County, Guizhou Province. In 1955 it came under the jurisdiction of Jingzhou Miao and Dong Autonomous County, Hunan Province. In 1958 it was renamed "Pingcha People's Commune". In 1994 it was upgraded to a town.

== Administrative division ==
As of 2017, the town is divided into ten villages: Pingcha (Chinese: 平茶村), Xinshan (Chinese: 新山村), Mianhua (Chinese: 棉花村), Malukou (Chinese: 马路口村), Xiaocha (Chinese: 小岔村), Shaba (Chinese: 沙坝村), Guantuan (Chinese: 官团村), Tielu (Chinese: 铁炉村), Dixiang (Chinese: 地祥村), Jiangbian (Chinese: 江边村), and one community: Pingcha Community (Chinese: 平茶居委会).

== Geography ==
The highest point in the town is Mount Yuhua (Chinese: 玉华山), which, at 1,107 metres (3,632 ft) above sea level.

== Economy ==
The town's economy is based on nearby mineral resources and agricultural resources. Mineral resources include gold, manganese, antimony and mineral water.

== Festival ==
Lusheng Festival (Chinese: 芦笙节) on the fifteenth day of the seventh month of the Chinese calendar is a festival in this town.

== Transportation ==
The Provincial Highway S222 passes across the town northeast to southwest.
