= Sanqiao, Jingzhou County =

Sanqiao Township
- Township

Chinese transcription(s)
  - Simplified: 三锹乡
  - Traditional: 三鍬鄉
  - Pinyin: Sānqiāo Xiāng
- Location in Hunan
- Coordinates: 26°36′40″N 109°26′55″E
- Country: China
- Province: Hunan
- Prefecture: Huaihua
- Autonomous county: Jingzhou Miao and Dong Autonomous County

Area
  - Total: 174.23 km^{2} (67.27 sq mi)

Population (2017)
  - Total: 5,000
  - Density: 29/km^{2} (74/sq mi)
- Time zone: UTC+8 (China Standard)
- Postal code: 418402
- Area code: 0745

Sanqiao Township (Chinese: 三锹乡) is a rural township in Jingzhou Miao and Dong Autonomous County, Hunan, China. As of the 2017 census it had a population of 5,000 and an area of 174.23 square kilometres (67.27 sq mi). The township shares a border with Jinping County and Liping County to the west, Quyang Town to the east, Aoshang Town to the southeast, Dabaozi Town to the north, and Outuan Township to the south. Among them, the Miao and Dong people account for 99% of the total population.

== Administrative division ==
As of 2017, the township is divided into 8 villages: Fengxiang (Chinese: 枫香村), Caidi (Chinese: 菜地村), Dimiao (Chinese: 地妙村), Yuanzhen (Chinese: 元贞村), Fengchong (Chinese: 凤冲村), Xiaoliu (Chinese: 小榴村), Disun (Chinese: 地笋村), and Nanshan (Chinese: 南山村).

== Geography ==
Mountains located adjacent to and visible from the townsite are: Mount Jiulong (九龙山; 1,036-metre (3,399 ft)), Mount Fengmu (枫木山; 998-metre (3,274 ft)) and Mount Pengpojie (蓬坡界; 943-metre (3,094 ft)).

The Guangping River (Chinese: 广坪河) passes through the town south to north.

== Economy ==
The economy is supported primarily by farming and ranching. Gastrodia elata is a major cash crop.

== Culture ==
The Miao folk songs and tea songs are the main music in this area.
