= Ná-Meo language =

Hmongic language spoken in Vietnam

Ná-Meo
- Na Meo
- Mieu
- Native to: Vietnam
- Region: Lang Son Province, Tuyen Quang Province
- Ethnicity: Mieu people
- Native speakers: 1,000 (2015)
- Language family: Hmong–Mien: Hmongic; Core Hmongic; East Hmongic; Southern Qiandong Miao; Ná-Meo

Language codes
- ISO 639-3: neo
- Glottolog: name1237

Ná-Meo (Vietnamese: Na Miểu; autonym: na53 mjau35 ɬa53) is a language of northern Vietnam, spoken by the Mieu people. Nguyen (2007) believes Na Meo may be a Hmongic language closest to Qiandong Miao.

== Classification ==
According to Hsiu (2015), Na Meo is most closely related to the Guncen 滚岑 and Zhenmin 振民 dialects of Southern Qiandong Miao (ISO 639-3: hms), which are spoken in Rongshui Miao Autonomous County, northern Guangxi Province, China. This is evidenced by the sound change Proto-Hmong–Mien *-ɛŋ > Proto-Na Meo-Guncen-Zhenmin *-a.

== Distribution ==
The following locations are reported in Ethnologue.

- Khánh Long Commune, Tràng Định District, northwestern Lạng Sơn Province
  - Khuổi Phu Dao village
- Cao Minh Commune
- Ca Liec village, Thạch An District, Cao Bằng Province

Nguyen (2007:31) reports the following additional locations.

- Khuổi Giảo village, Cao Minh Commune, Tràng Định District, Lạng Sơn Province
- Cai Liệng village, Thúy Hùng Commune, Thạch An District, Cao Bằng Province (ancestors crossed over from China via Trùng Khánh District)
- Vũ Loan Commune, Na Rì District, Bắc Kạn Province
- Kim Quan Commune, Yên Sơn District, Tuyên Quang Province (ancestors came from Yunnan to Bắc Giang Province via the Red River). Hsiu (2015) identifies the hamlet of Khuân Hẻ as the sole Na Meo-speaking location in Kim Quan Commune, Tuyên Quang Province.

== Sources ==
- Hsiu, Andrew (2015). The classification of Na Meo, a Hmong-Mien language of Vietnam. Paper presented at SEALS 25, Chiang Mai, Thailand. doi:10.5281/zenodo.1127804
- Nguyễn Văn Thắng (2007). Ambiguity of Identity: The Mieu in North Vietnam. Chiang Mai: Silkworm Books.
- Nguyễn Anh Ngọc (1975). "Vài nét về nhóm Na Miểu". In, Ủy ban khoa học xã hội Việt Nam: Viện dân tộc học. Về vấn đề xác định thánh phần các dân tộc thiểu số ở miền bắc Việt Nam, 377-388. Hà Nội: Nhà xuất bản khoa học xã hội.
