= Wenxi (disambiguation) =

Wenxi may refer to the following places in China:

- Wenxi County (闻喜县), Yuncheng, Shanxi
- Wenxi, Zhejiang (温溪镇), town and subdivision of Qingtian County, Zhejiang
- Wenxi, Jingzhou County (文溪乡), township and subdivision of Jingzhou Miao and Dong Autonomous County, Hunan
- Wenxi Township, Sichuan (闻溪乡), township in Jiange County, Sichuan

== See also ==
- Wenxi Fire (文夕大火), 1938 fire in Changsha, Hunan
