= Sanqiao language =

Mixed language spoken in Guizhou, China

Sanqiao
- Native to: China
- Region: Guizhou
- Ethnicity: Miao
- Native speakers: 6,000 (2017)
- Language family: Hmong–Mien: Hmongic; East Hmongic; Eastern Qiandong Miao; Sanqiao

Language codes
- ISO 639-3: None (mis)
- Glottolog: sanq1234

Sanqiao (Chinese: 三锹话/三橇话) is a Hmongic language spoken in Jinping County and Liping County, Guizhou, China by about 6,000 people.

The Sanqiao people sing traditional songs using the Suantang language (酸汤话), a Sinitic language that is similar to New Xiang.

== Classification ==
A study by Hsiu (2024) found that Sanqiao is an East Hmongic (Central Miao) language, belonging to the East Qiandong dialectal group.

Earlier demographic studies performed by non-linguists claimed that Sanqiao vocabulary is about 30–40% Miao (Hmu) and 40%-50% Dong (Kam), with the remainder consisting of Chinese words.

Sanqiao speakers can understand the local Dong and Miao dialects, but the Dong and Miao cannot understand the Sanqiao language.

== Distribution ==
In Liping County and Jinping County, Guizhou, the Sanqiao live in just over 20 villages, with over 6,000 people (Yu 2017).

Sanqiao in a broader sense, however, is a grouping of about 30,000 people who speak unrelated languages, who are spread across Jingzhou, Huitong, Tongdao, and Suining counties of Hunan, and Liping, Jinping, and Tianzhu counties of Guizhou. In Hunan, they are also known as the Flowery Miao (花苗) or Flowery-Clothed Miao (花衣苗), while in Guizhou they are known as the Sanqiao people (三撬人).

The Sanqiao are distributed in the following locations of Qiandongnan Prefecture, Guizhou (Deng 2010). There are 22 villages in total.

- Liping County
  - Pingdi Township 平底乡, Shangchong District 尚重区: Cendun 岑趸, Wushan 乌山, Bijie 俾嗟, Yanpi 眼批, Dongweng 董翁, Guidou 归斗, Guiya 归雅, Wule 乌勒, Pingdi 平底, Wupeng 乌碰, Tangtu 塘途, Gaoliang 高练, Biyazhai 俾雅寨
  - Dajia Township 大稼乡: Cennuzhai 岑努寨
- Jinping County
  - Pinglüe 平略 and Qimeng 启蒙 townships: Zhaizao 寨早, Wendou 文斗, Shengli 胜利, Guben 固本, Xinming 新明, Dicha 地茶, Qimeng 启蒙, Yuhe 裕河
