= Star Xu =

Chinese business executive (born 1985)

- Xu in 2026
- Born: 1985 (age 40–41); Shuangjiang, Tongdao, China
- Other name: Star Xu
- Education: University of Science and Technology Beijing (BSc.)
- Occupation: Businessman
- Known for: Founder and CEO of OKX

Star Xu
- Traditional Chinese: 徐明星
- Simplified Chinese: 徐明星
Transcriptions
Standard Mandarin
- Hanyu Pinyin: Xú Míngxīng

Mingxing Xu (Chinese: 徐明星; pinyin: Xú Míngxīng; born 1985), commonly referred to as Star Xu, is a Chinese businessman best known as the founder and CEO of OKX.

== Education and early career ==
Xu was born in 1985 in Shuangjiang, Tongdao, in Hunan, China and graduated in 2006 with a Bachelor's degree in Applied physics from the University of Science and Technology Beijing. Xu dropped out of his Master’s program in Physics at the Renmin University of China to found Wantuan.com, a Groupon-inspired group buying website. He later joined Yahoo China as an engineer.

In 2007, Xu co-founded the document-sharing website Docin.com and served as its chief technology officer (CTO) until 2012.

== Career ==
In 2013, Xu co-founded cryptocurrency exchange OKX.

In 2019, Xu acquired a controlling stake in Leap Holdings, a Hong Kong Stock Exchange-listed firm, for US$60 million. Leap has been rebranded to OKG Technology Holdings Limited, a financial technology and construction company.

In 2021, an Entrepreneur article estimated his personal net worth at US$1.4 billion.
