= Zhaiya Township =

- Township

Chinese transcription(s)
  - Simplified: 寨牙乡
  - Traditional: 寨牙鄉
  - Pinyin: Zhàiyá Xiāng
- Location in Hunan
- Coordinates: 26°31′50″N 109°50′23″E
- Country: China
- Province: Hunan
- Prefecture: Huaihua
- Autonomous county: Jingzhou Miao and Dong Autonomous County

Area
  - Total: 136.4 km^{2} (52.7 sq mi)
- Elevation: 750 m (2,460 ft)

Population (2017)
  - Total: 7,756
  - Density: 56.86/km^{2} (147.3/sq mi)
- Time zone: UTC+8 (China Standard)
- Postal code: 418411
- Area code: 0745

Zhaiya Township (Chinese: 寨牙乡) is a rural township in Jingzhou Miao and Dong Autonomous County, Hunan, China. As of the 2017 census it had a population of 7,756 and an area of 136.4 square kilometres (52.7 sq mi). It is surrounded by Wenxi Township on the north, Quyang Town on the west, Suining County on the east, and Xikou Town of Tongdao County on the south.

== History ==
In March 1985, the Zhaiya Dong and Miao Ethnics Township was established. In July 1987 it was renamed "Zhaiya Township".

== Geography ==
The Laoya Stream (Chinese: 老鸦溪), a tributary of the Qujiang River (Chinese: 渠江), winds through the township.

The highest point in the township and the whole county is Mount Qingdian (Chinese: 青靛山) which stands 1,176 metres (3,858 ft) above sea level. The second highest point in the township is Mount Yanjingtou (Chinese: 盐井头), which, at 1,062 metres (3,484 ft) above sea level.

The whole township has a mild climate and distinct seasons. It belongs to the subtropical monsoon humid climate zone. There is no heat in summer and no severe cold in winter.

== Economy ==
The township's economy is based on nearby mineral resources and agricultural resources. Mineral resources include gold, copper, manganese and oil. Fruits include walnut and kiwifruit.

== Transportation ==
The Provincial Highway S221 passes across the township northwest to east.

The G65 Baotou–Maoming Expressway is a northwest–southeast highway in the township.

== Attractions ==
The Guihua Bridge (Chinese: 桂花桥; lit. 'Osmanthus Bridge') is an 18th-century bridge in the township. It was built in the Qianlong period (1736–1795) of the Qing dynasty (1644–1911).
