= Sanjiang =

Sanjiang (Chinese: 三江; lit. 'three rivers') means Three Rivers in Chinese and might refer to:

- Historically, the collective name for the four provinces of Jiangsu, Zhejiang and Jiangxi. Jiangsu and Anhui were originally part of the Jiangnan Province, hence the name "Sanjiang" (Three Rivers) together with Zhejiang and Jiangxi.
- The Wu-speaking region of Zhejiang and southern Jiangsu. People from the region were referred to as "Shanghai people" or "Sanjiang people".
- The Three Parallel Rivers of southwestern China: the Jinsha (upper Yangtze), the Lancang (Mekong), and the Nu (Salween).

It may also refer to:

- Sanjiang Dong Autonomous County, Guangxi
- Sanjiang College, Nanjing
- Sanjiang Plain, in eastern Heilongjiang north of the Changbai Mountains and east of the Lesser Khingan

== Subdistricts ==
- Sanjiang Subdistrict, Chongqing, in Qijiang District
- Sanjiang Subdistrict, Guiyang, in Xiaohe District, Guiyang, Guizhou
- Sanjiang Subdistrict, Jinhua, in Wucheng District, Jinhua, Zhejiang
- Sanjiang Subdistrict, Shengzhou, Zhejiang
- Sanjiang Subdistrict, Yongjia County, Zhejiang

== Towns ==
- Sanjiang, Daozhen County (Daozhen Gelao and Miao Autonomous County), Guizhou
- Sanjiang, Qiandongnan, in Jinping County, Guizhou
- Sanjiang, Jiangmen, Guangdong
- Sanjiang, Liannan County (Liannan Yao Autonomous County), Guangdong
- Sanjiang, Hainan, in Meilan District, Haikou
- Sanjiang, Miluo (三江镇), a town in Miluo City, Hunan province
- Sanjiang, Xupu (三江镇), a town of Xupu County, Hunan
- Sanjiang, Nanchang County, Jiangxi
- Sanjiang, Bazhong, in Bazhou District, Bazhong, Sichuan
- Sanjiang, Chongzhou, Sichuan
- Sanjiang, Jingyan County, Sichuan
- Sanjiang, Wangcang County, Sichuan

== Townships ==
- Sanjiang Township, Gongcheng County (Gongcheng Yao Autonomous County), Guangxi
- Sanjiang Township, Jinxiu County (Jinxiu Yao Autonomous County), Guangxi
- Sanjiang Township, Jiangxi, in Nankang, Jiangxi
- Sanjiang Township, Sichuan, in Wenchuan County
- Sanjiang Sui Ethnic Township, Rongjiang County, Guizhou

== Other ==
- Sanjiang Church, church in Wenzhou, China
