= Dabaozi, Hunan =

Dabaozi Town
- Town

Chinese transcription(s)
  - Simplified: 大堡子镇
  - Traditional: 大堡子鎮
  - Pinyin: Dàbǎozǐ Zhèn
- Location in Hunan
- Coordinates: 26°42′02″N 109°27′48″E
- Country: China
- Province: Hunan
- Prefecture: Huaihua
- Autonomous county: Jingzhou Miao and Dong Autonomous County

Area
  - Total: 176.44 km^{2} (68.12 sq mi)

Population (2017)
  - Total: 21,000
  - Density: 120/km^{2} (310/sq mi)
- Time zone: UTC+8 (China Standard)
- Postal code: 418401
- Area code: 0745

Dabaozi (Chinese: 大堡子镇) is a rural town in Jingzhou Miao and Dong Autonomous County, Hunan, China. As of the 2017 census it had a population of 21,000 and an area of 176.44 square kilometres (68.12 sq mi). The town shares a border with Sanjiang Town of Jinping County to the west, Aoshang Town to the east, Zhulin Township of Tianzhu County to the north, and Sanqiao Township to the south.

== History ==
In 1994 it was upgraded to a town.

== Administrative division ==
As of 2017, the town is divided into 17 villages: Fangjiang (Chinese: 防江村), Qianjin (Chinese: 前进村), Mutang (Chinese: 木塘村), Damu (Chinese: 大木村), Yanwan (Chinese: 岩湾村), Tongle (Chinese: 同乐村), Sanjiang (Chinese: 三江村), Meizi (Chinese: 梅子村), Tangkuan (Chinese: 塘款村), Yanzhai (Chinese: 岩寨村), Baozi (Chinese: 堡子村), Shanghe (Chinese: 上河村), Huangtan (Chinese: 黄潭村), Niuchang (Chinese: 牛场村), Miaochong (Chinese: 苗冲村), Yangjia (Chinese: 阳家村), Jiangchong (Chinese: 江冲村), and one community: Baozi Community (Chinese: 堡子居委会).

== Geography ==
The Guangping River (Chinese: 广坪河) passes through the town south to north.

The highest point in the town is Mount Wuduomei (Chinese: 五朵梅) which stands 801 metres (2,628 ft) above sea level.
