= HZH =

HZH may refer to:

- HZH, IATA code for Liping Airport, Guizhou, China
- HZH, the Telegraph and Pinyin code for Hangzhou railway station, Zhejiang, China
