= Tràng Định =

- Interactive map of Tràng Định
- Coordinates: 22.248857450870318°N 106.46804251304032°E
- Country: Vietnam
- Province: Lạng Sơn
- Region: Northeast
- Established: 16 June 2025

Area
  - Total: 118.41 km^{2} (45.72 sq mi)

Population (2025)
  - Total: 11,529
  - Density: 97/km^{2} (250/sq mi)

Tràng Định is a commune in Lạng Sơn province, Vietnam.

== History ==
The area of present-day Tràng Định commune was formerly part of Tràng Định district, Lạng Sơn province.

On 16 June 2025:

- The National Assembly of Vietnam adopted Resolution No. 203/2025/QH15, amending and supplementing several articles of the Constitution of Vietnam. The resolution took effect on 16 June 2025. The resolution provided for the termination of district-level administrative units nationwide from 1 July 2025.
- The Standing Committee of the National Assembly of Vietnam issued Resolution No. 1672/NQ-UBTVQH15 on the reorganization of commune-level administrative units in Lạng Sơn province in 2025, which took effect on 16 June 2025. Under the resolution, the entire area and population of the former communes of Đề Thám, Hùng Sơn, and Hùng Việt were consolidated to form a new commune named Tràng Định.
