= Hongzhou =

Hongzhou may refer to:

- Hongzhou (prince) (1712–1770), a Qing dynasty prince
- Hongzhou school, a Chinese school of Chán Buddhism in the Tang period
- Hongzhou Town, a town in Liping County, Guizhou, China
- Hongzhou Township, a township in Huixian, Henan, China
- Hong Prefecture, a former prefecture between the 6th and 12th centuries in modern Jiangxi, China
