= Tongdao Dong Autonomous County =

Tongdao County 通道县 Tungtao
- County
- 通道侗族自治县; Tongdao Dong Autonomous County
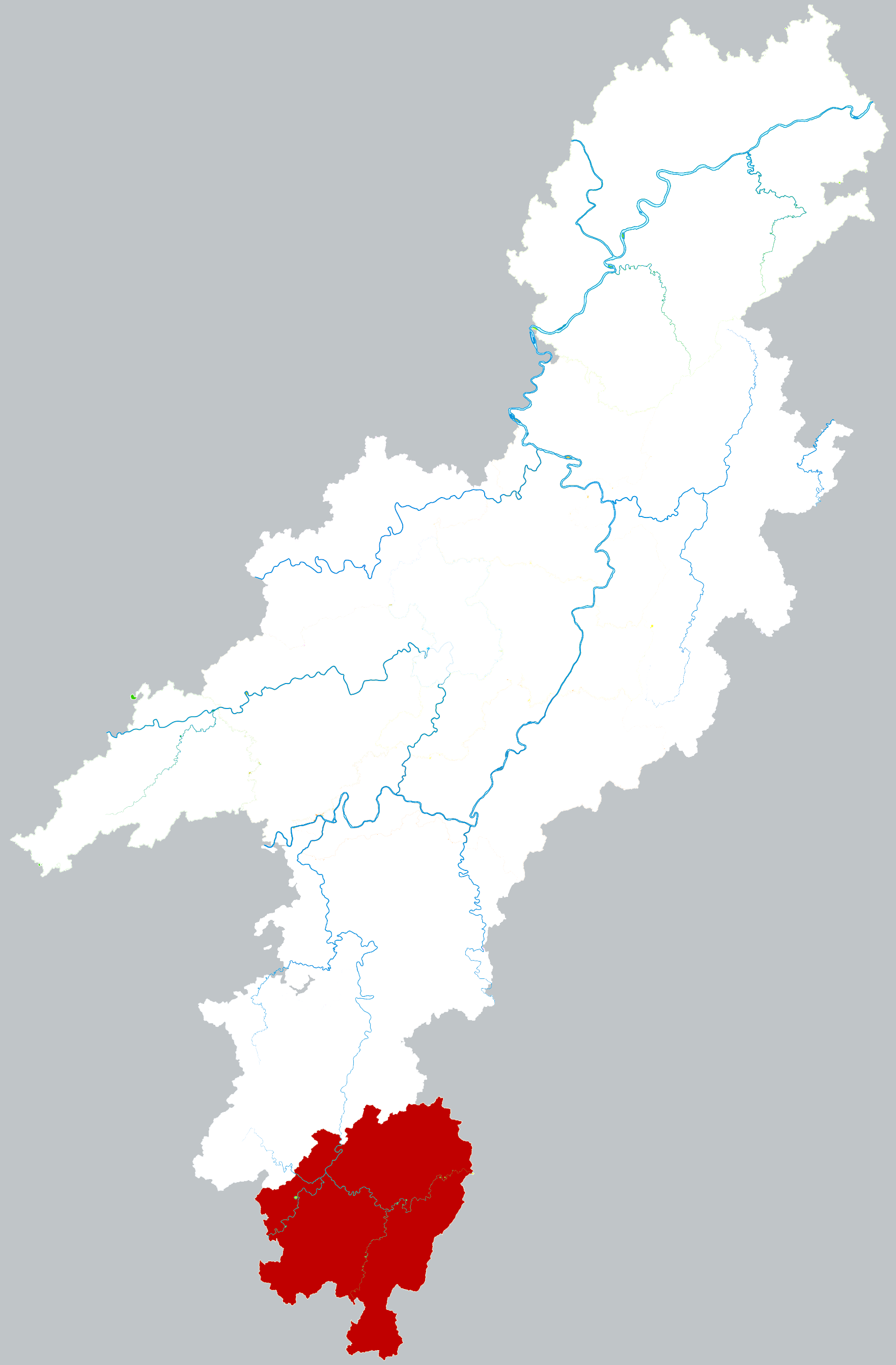
- Location of Tongdao Dong Autonomous County within Huaihua

- Location in Hunan
- Coordinates: 26°09′25″N 109°47′02″E
- Country: People's Republic of China
- Province: Hunan
- Prefecture-level city: Huaihua
- County seat: Shuangjiang

Area
  - Total: 2,225.36 km^{2} (859.22 sq mi)

Population (2010)
  - Total: 206,650
  - Density: 92.861/km^{2} (240.51/sq mi)
- Time zone: UTC+8 (China Standard)
- Postal code: 4185XX

Tongdao (the full name: "Tongdao Dong Autonomous County", simplified Chinese: 通道侗族自治县; traditional Chinese: 通道侗族自治縣; pinyin: Tōngdào Dòngzú Zìzhìxiàn; usually referred to as "Tongdao County", simplified Chinese: 通道县; traditional Chinese: 通道縣; pinyin: Tōngdào Xiàn) is an autonomous county of Dong people in Hunan Province, China. It is under the administration of the prefecture-level city of Huaihua. Tongdao is also the 5th least-populous county of the province (after Shaoshan, Guzhang, Shuangpai and Yanling).

Located on the south western corner of Hunan province, Tongdao borders Guizhou to the west and Guangxi to the south. The county lies in the southernmost part of Huaihua, it is the least populous and least densely populated county-level division of Huaihua. Tongdao borders to the northwest by Jingzhou County, to the northeast by Suining and Chengbu Counties, to the southeast and the south by Longsheng and Sanjiang Counties of Guangxi, and to the west by Liping County of Guizhou. The county covers an area of 2,239 km^{2} (864 sq mi), and as of 2015, it has a census registered population of 242,100 and a permanent resident population of 212,300. The county has 8 towns and 3 townships under its jurisdiction, and the county seat is Shuangjiang Town (双江镇).

There are two Miao subgroups in Tongdao County, namely Hua Miao (花苗 mjiu55 ken35) and Cao Miao (草苗 mjiu55). Despite being officially classified by the Chinese government as ethnic Miao, Cao Miao is actually a Kam-Sui language.

== Climate ==
Climate data for Tongdao, elevation 398 m (1,306 ft), (1991–2020 normals, extremes 1981–present)
Month	Jan	Feb	Mar	Apr	May	Jun	Jul	Aug	Sep	Oct	Nov	Dec	Year
Record high °C (°F)	24.2 (75.6)	28.5 (83.3)	32.6 (90.7)	32.4 (90.3)	34.3 (93.7)	36.3 (97.3)	36.8 (98.2)	38.1 (100.6)	36.5 (97.7)	34.0 (93.2)	30.8 (87.4)	25.6 (78.1)	38.1 (100.6)
Mean daily maximum °C (°F)	9.3 (48.7)	12.3 (54.1)	16.2 (61.2)	22.4 (72.3)	26.4 (79.5)	29.0 (84.2)	31.3 (88.3)	31.5 (88.7)	28.7 (83.7)	23.2 (73.8)	18.2 (64.8)	12.5 (54.5)	21.8 (71.1)
Daily mean °C (°F)	5.7 (42.3)	8.2 (46.8)	11.9 (53.4)	17.5 (63.5)	21.4 (70.5)	24.6 (76.3)	26.4 (79.5)	25.9 (78.6)	22.8 (73.0)	17.8 (64.0)	12.7 (54.9)	7.6 (45.7)	16.9 (62.4)
Mean daily minimum °C (°F)	3.3 (37.9)	5.6 (42.1)	9.1 (48.4)	14.2 (57.6)	18.1 (64.6)	21.8 (71.2)	23.2 (73.8)	22.5 (72.5)	19.2 (66.6)	14.5 (58.1)	9.4 (48.9)	4.5 (40.1)	13.8 (56.8)
Record low °C (°F)	−5.6 (21.9)	−5.0 (23.0)	−3.2 (26.2)	1.1 (34.0)	7.1 (44.8)	11.7 (53.1)	16.2 (61.2)	16.6 (61.9)	10.3 (50.5)	1.4 (34.5)	−2.3 (27.9)	−6.9 (19.6)	−6.9 (19.6)
Average precipitation mm (inches)	70.9 (2.79)	73.8 (2.91)	120.2 (4.73)	146.5 (5.77)	236.8 (9.32)	264.1 (10.40)	195.2 (7.69)	121.0 (4.76)	82.3 (3.24)	84.2 (3.31)	63.8 (2.51)	51.3 (2.02)	1,510.1 (59.45)
Average precipitation days (≥ 0.1 mm)	16.5	14.9	19.7	17.7	18.2	17.7	14.0	12.1	9.1	10.8	11.4	11.9	174
Average snowy days	3.7	1.6	0.3	0	0	0	0	0	0	0	0	1.0	6.6
Average relative humidity (%)	82	80	83	82	82	83	80	81	80	81	81	79	81
Mean monthly sunshine hours	43.5	52.9	57.9	91.3	118.4	118.5	194.4	193.8	148.1	113.4	98.3	80.2	1,310.7
Percentage possible sunshine	13	17	16	24	28	29	46	48	41	32	30	25	29
Source: China Meteorological Administration all-time extreme temperature
