= Maoping, Qiandongnan Prefecture =

Maoping 茅坪镇
- Town
- Location in China
- Coordinates: 26°44′21″N 109°13′52″E
- Country: People's Republic of China
- Province: Guizhou
- Autonomous prefecture: Qiandongnan Miao and Dong Autonomous Prefecture
- County: Jinping County
- Time zone: UTC+8 (China Standard)

Maoping (Chinese: 茅坪; pinyin: Máopíng) is a town under the administration of Jinping County, Guizhou, China. As of 2018, it has 3 villages under its administration.

== See also ==
- List of township-level divisions of Guizhou
