= OKX =

International, multi-language cryptocurrency exchange

- Type: Private
- Industry: Cryptocurrency
- Founded: 2013
- Founder: Star Xu
- Headquarters: San Jose, California, United States
- Area served: Worldwide
- Products: Cryptocurrency Exchange, Cryptocurrencies
- Website: okx.com

OKX, formerly known as OKEx, is a cryptocurrency exchange based in San Jose, California.

== History ==
OKX started as Okcoin, a cryptocurrency exchange founded in 2013 by Star Xu. The platform later expanded internationally and launched as OKEx in 2017 in Hong Kong.

On July 30, 2018, a trader reportedly bought bitcoin futures with a $416 million notional value on margin before being forced by the exchange to liquidate his position at a large loss. The exchange injected 2,500 Bitcoins, worth about $18 million at the time, into an insurance fund to help minimize the impact on clients. However, to cover for the outstanding amount, traders who had made an unrealized profit during the previous week still had to pay a clawback rate of 17 percent, the so-called "socialized clawback".

On October 16, 2020 OKX temporarily suspended withdrawals as the founder cooperated with a police investigation. On November 19, 2020 OKX announced that withdrawals would reopen and will resume on or before November 27.

In 2021, Baidu, Weibo, and other Chinese Internet platforms blocked keywords such as "OKEx", "Binance", and "Huobi". In October 2021, OKX, initially headquartered in Beijing, China, announced that it would stop serving customers in Mainland China due to new regulations. Its founding team has since moved, with few outsourced personnel working in the region.

In 2022, OKEx rebranded to OKX. In March 2022, OKX rejected calls to ban Russian crypto trading.

In March 2026, NYSE parent Intercontinental Exchange invested in OKX, pushing the company's valuation to US$25 billion.

Star Xu, the founder of OKX, in 2026 at Token2029 Singapore conference.

In October 2026 OKX had an undisclosed size funding round at a $25 billion evulation which included investments by Ripple Labs, Circle Internet Group, SC Ventures, StanChart and QRT. The same month OKXICE a joint venture between OKX and Intercontinental Exchange filed with the SEC to launch a tokenized US stock trading platform.

== Products ==
=== OKB ===
OKB is the native utility token of the OKX exchange. In 2025, OKX announced an overhaul of the token's economic model under which OKB became the sole native gas token of X Layer (blockchain platform).

== Sponsorship ==
In September of the same year, OKX and McLaren unveiled a cyberpunk-inspired livery by enhancing the iconic Fluro Papaya colorway with flourishes of pink and cyberpunk-inspired engine illustrations for the 2022 Singapore and Japanese Grands Prix.

Tribeca Festival signed OKX as its new top sponsor in June 2022. At Tribeca events, OKX holds exclusivity for non-fungible token (NFT) marketplaces, cryptocurrency exchanges, usage of social tokens, and De-Fi and Game Fi trading categories.

== Legal status ==
In July 2022, OKX received a provisional virtual asset license in Dubai, which would allow OKX to provide access to some products and services to investors in the United Arab Emirates.

In March 2023, OKX applied for a virtual asset license in Hong Kong, two months before the city officially made crypto trading fully legal.

In April 2023, OKX incorporated in France and has since announced plans to build out its European hub in Paris.

In April 2025, OKX relaunched operations in the United States and relocated its headquarters to San Jose.
