= Mount Fei =

Mountain in China

- Location within Hunan

Highest point
- Elevation: 720-metre (2,360 ft)
- Coordinates: 26°35′04″N 109°41′02″E

Geography
- Location: Jingzhou Miao and Dong Autonomous County, Hunan
- Country: China

Chinese name
- Traditional Chinese: 飛山
- Simplified Chinese: 飞山
- Literal meaning: Flying Mountain
Transcriptions
Standard Mandarin
- Hanyu Pinyin: Fēishān

Mount Fei (Chinese: 飞山; lit. 'Flying Mountain') is a 720-metre (2,360 ft) mountain in the northwest of Jingzhou Miao and Dong Autonomous County, Hunan, China. Its peak elevation is 720 metres (2,360 ft).

== History ==
During the Five Dynasties and Ten Kingdoms period (907–979), King Wumu of Chu, Ma Yin, sent troops to attack Chengzhou (now Jingzhou Miao and Dong Autonomous County), local chiefs Pan Jinsheng (潘金盛) and Yang Chenglei (杨承磊) resisted the attack by favourable terrain. Now the trenches on the mount are still there. After the death of Yang Zaisi, local people built a temple on the top to commemorate him and called him "Grandpa Mount Fei" (飞山爷爷).

== Temples ==
There are four Buddhist temples and one Taoist temple on the mount, namely Toubaoding (头宝鼎), Erbaoding (二宝鼎), Sanbaoding (三宝鼎), Chan Temple of Mount Fei (飞山禅寺) and Fangguang Temple (方广寺).

The Toubaoding is situated on the top of the mount. It was originally built in the Yuanfeng period (1078–1085) of the Song dynasty (960–1279) but turned to ashes by a devastating fire in 1899 in the reign of Guangxu Emperor of the Qing dynasty (1644–1911). The present version was completed in 1903.

The Sanbaoding was built in 1693 in the 32nd year of Kangxi period in the Qing dynasty, and it is still intact.

The Chan Temple of Mount Fei was built on the site of former Songyun Chan Temple (松云禅寺) in 2005. The entire temple faces south with the Shanmen, Four Heavenly Kings Hall, Hall of Yuantong (圆通宝殿), and the Mahavira Hall along the central axis of the complex.

The Fangguang Temple is located at the foot of the mount, the existing main buildings include the Main Hall, Sanqing Hall (三清殿; 'Hall of the Three Pure Ones'), Lingguan Hall (灵官殿; 'Hall of Spiritual Officer') and Wangxu Pavilion (望虚亭; 'Pavilion of Looking Void'). Some pieces of stone tablet are displayed in the temple. The Main Hall underwent two renovations, respectively in 1993 and 2001.
