= Taiyangping Township =

- Township

Chinese transcription(s)
  - Simplified: 太阳坪乡
  - Traditional: 太陽坪鄉
  - Pinyin: Tàiyángpíng Xiāng
- Location in Hunan
- Coordinates: 26°43′06″N 109°43′30″E
- Country: China
- Province: Hunan
- Prefecture: Huaihua
- Autonomous county: Jingzhou Miao and Dong Autonomous County

Area
  - Total: 88.78 km^{2} (34.28 sq mi)
- Elevation: 320.6 m (1,052 ft)

Population (2017)
  - Total: 12,235
  - Density: 137.8/km^{2} (356.9/sq mi)
- Time zone: UTC+8 (China Standard)
- Postal code: 418403
- Area code: 0745

Taiyangping Township (Chinese: 太阳坪乡) is a rural township in Jingzhou Miao and Dong Autonomous County, Hunan, China. As of the 2017 census it had a population of 12,235 and an area of 88.78 square kilometres (34.28 sq mi). It is surrounded by Huitong County on the north and northwest, Aoshang Town on the west, Gantang Town on the east, and Quyang Town on the south.

== Administrative division ==
As of 2017, the township is divided into 14 villages: Taiyangping (Chinese: 太阳坪村), Guanbaodu (Chinese: 贯堡渡村), Zhuge (Chinese: 朱戈村), Longtou (Chinese: 垅头村), Jintan (Chinese: 金滩村), Gucun (Chinese: 古村村), Shaxi (Chinese: 沙溪村), Xinjian (Chinese: 新建村), Xingzhai (Chinese: 星寨村), Balong (Chinese: 八龙村), Tuxi (Chinese: 土溪村), Jilizhai (Chinese: 吉利寨村), Dimang (Chinese: 地芒村), and Zhuzhai (Chinese: 竹寨村).

== Geography ==
Most of the area of Taiyangping Township is the Qujiang River valley basin, with a low terrain and an average altitude of 320.6 metres (1,052 ft). It belongs to the subtropical seasonal climate. The climate is mild, the rain is abundant and the seasons are distinct.

The highest point in the township is Mount Chezijie (Chinese: 车子界) which stands 552 metres (1,811 ft) above sea level. The second highest point in the township is Mount Dashanbei (Chinese: 大山北), which, at 504 metres (1,654 ft) above sea level.

The Zongchong Reservoir (Chinese: 宗冲水库) is the largest body of water in the township.

The Qushui River (Chinese: 渠水) winds through the township.

== Economy ==
Agriculture here is dominated by rice, watermelon, citrus, pear, myrica and chestnut.

== Education ==
There is a middle school and ten primary schools in the whole township.

== Transportation ==
The National Highway G209 passes across the township south to north.

The G65 Baotou–Maoming Expressway is a north-south highway in the township.

The Jiaozuo–Liuzhou railway passes across the town north to south.
