= Outuan Township =

- Township

Chinese transcription(s)
  - Simplified: 藕团乡
  - Traditional: 藕團鄉
  - Pinyin: Oǔtuán Xiāng
- Location in Hunan
- Coordinates: 26°24′49″N 109°26′19″E
- Country: China
- Province: Hunan
- Prefecture: Huaihua
- Autonomous county: Jingzhou Miao and Dong Autonomous County

Area
  - Total: 150 km^{2} (58 sq mi)

Population (2017)
  - Total: 9,000
  - Density: 60/km^{2} (160/sq mi)
- Time zone: UTC+8 (China Standard)
- Postal code: 418414
- Area code: 0745

Outuan Township (Chinese: 藕团乡) is a rural township in Jingzhou Miao and Dong Autonomous County, Hunan, China. As of the 2017 census it had a population of 9,000 and an area of 150 square kilometres (58 sq mi). The township is bordered to the north by Sanqiao Township, to the east by Quyang Town, to the southwest by Pingcha Town, to the west by Dunzhai Town of Jinping County, and to the southeast by Xinchang Town.

== History ==
After the founding of the Communist State in 1950, it belonged to the South District (Chinese: 南区). In 1956, Outuan Township was established. In 1958 it was renamed "Outuan People's Commune". In 1984 its name was changed to "Outuan Miao Ethnic Township". In 1987 it restored the original name "Outuan Township".

== Administrative division ==
As of 2017, the township is divided into 11 villages: Outuan (Chinese: 藕团村), Sanqiao (Chinese: 三桥村), Tuanshan (Chinese: 团山村), Longtuan (Chinese: 陇团村), Xinzhai (Chinese: 新寨村), Tandong (Chinese: 潭洞村), Xinjie (Chinese: 新街村), Gaoying (Chinese: 高营村), Gaopo (Chinese: 高坡村), Laoli (Chinese: 老里村), and Kangtou (Chinese: 康头村).

== Geography ==
The Nantuanba Reservoir (Chinese: 南团坝水库) is the largest body of water in the township. The Dilichong Reservoir (Chinese: 地里冲水库) is a reservoir and the second largest body of water in the township.

The Sixiang River (Chinese: 四乡河) passes through the township north to south.

The highest point in the township is Mount Nantuanpo (Chinese: 南团坡), which, at 937 metres (3,074 ft) above sea level.

== Economy ==
The township's economy is based on nearby mineral resources and agricultural resources. The minerals in the township are coal, gold and bauxite.

== Transportation ==
The Provincial Highway S222 passes across the town northeast to southwest.
