= Gantang, Jingzhou County =

Gantang Town
- Town

Chinese transcription(s)
  - Simplified: 甘棠镇
  - Traditional: 甘棠鎮
  - Pinyin: Gāntáng Zhèn
- Location in Hunan
- Coordinates: 26°43′05″N 109°46′31″E
- Country: China
- Province: Hunan
- Prefecture: Huaihua
- Autonomous county: Jingzhou Miao and Dong Autonomous County

Area
  - Total: 134.6 km^{2} (52.0 sq mi)

Population (2017)
  - Total: 24,000
  - Density: 180/km^{2} (460/sq mi)
- Time zone: UTC+8 (China Standard)
- Postal code: 418405
- Area code: 0745

Gantang (Chinese: 甘棠镇) is a rural town in Jingzhou Miao and Dong Autonomous County, Hunan, China. As of the 2017 census it had a population of 24,000 and an area of 134.6 square kilometres (52.0 sq mi). Miao and Dong people account for 86.7% of the total population in the town. It has the reputation of "granary" and "fruit town" in Jingzhou County. It is surrounded by Shaxi Township on the north, Taiyangping Township on the west, Wenxi Township on the east, and Quyang Town on the south.

== History ==
After the founding of the Communist State in 1950, Gantang Township was established. In 1958 it was renamed "Gantang People's Commune". In 1984 it was upgraded to a town.

== Administrative division ==
As of 2017, the town is divided into 17 villages: Hongguang (Chinese: 红光村), Xikou (Chinese: 溪口村), Pingyuan (Chinese: 平原村), Liaoyuan (Chinese: 燎原村), Tangtou (Chinese: 塘头村), Diling (Chinese: 地灵村), Tiandi (Chinese: 田地村), Gaofeng (Chinese: 高峰村), Gupo (Chinese: 古坡村), Lequn (Chinese: 乐群村), Longfeng (Chinese: 龙峰村), Jianguo (Chinese: 建国村), Daqiao (Chinese: 大桥村), Zhaixing (Chinese: 寨姓村), Shamu (Chinese: 杉木村), Shanmen (Chinese: 山门村), Nongchang (Chinese: 农场村), and one community: Gantang Community (Chinese: 甘棠居委会).

== Geography ==
There are two reservoirs in the town: Diling Reservoir (Chinese: 地灵水库) and Shuita'ao Reservoir (Chinese: 水塔坳水库).

The Qu River passes through the western town.

== Economy ==
The town's economy is based on nearby mineral resources and agricultural resources. Mineral resources are mainly gold, coal and bauxite. Township enterprises are mainly building materials.

== Transportation ==
The G65 Baotou–Maoming Expressway is a north-south highway in the town.

The town is connected to the Jiaozuo–Liuzhou railway.
