= Cao Minh =

Coordinates: 22°33′45″N 105°37′28″E

- Rural commune
- Interactive map of Cao Minh
- Country: Vietnam
- Province: Thái Nguyên
- Time zone: UTC+07:00 (Indochina Time)

Cao Minh is a rural commune (xã) of Thái Nguyên Province, in Vietnam.

In June 2025, Cao Minh Commune was established through the merger of the entire natural area and population of Công Bằng Commune (natural area: 54.08 km²; population: 3,379), Cổ Linh Commune (natural area: 39.68 km²; population: 4,827), and Cao Tân Commune (natural area: 41.13 km²; population: 4,601) of Pác Nặm District.
