= Jingzhou Miao and Dong Autonomous County =

Jingzhou County 靖州县
- Autonomous county
- 靖州苗族侗族自治县; Jingzhou Miao and Dong Autonomous County
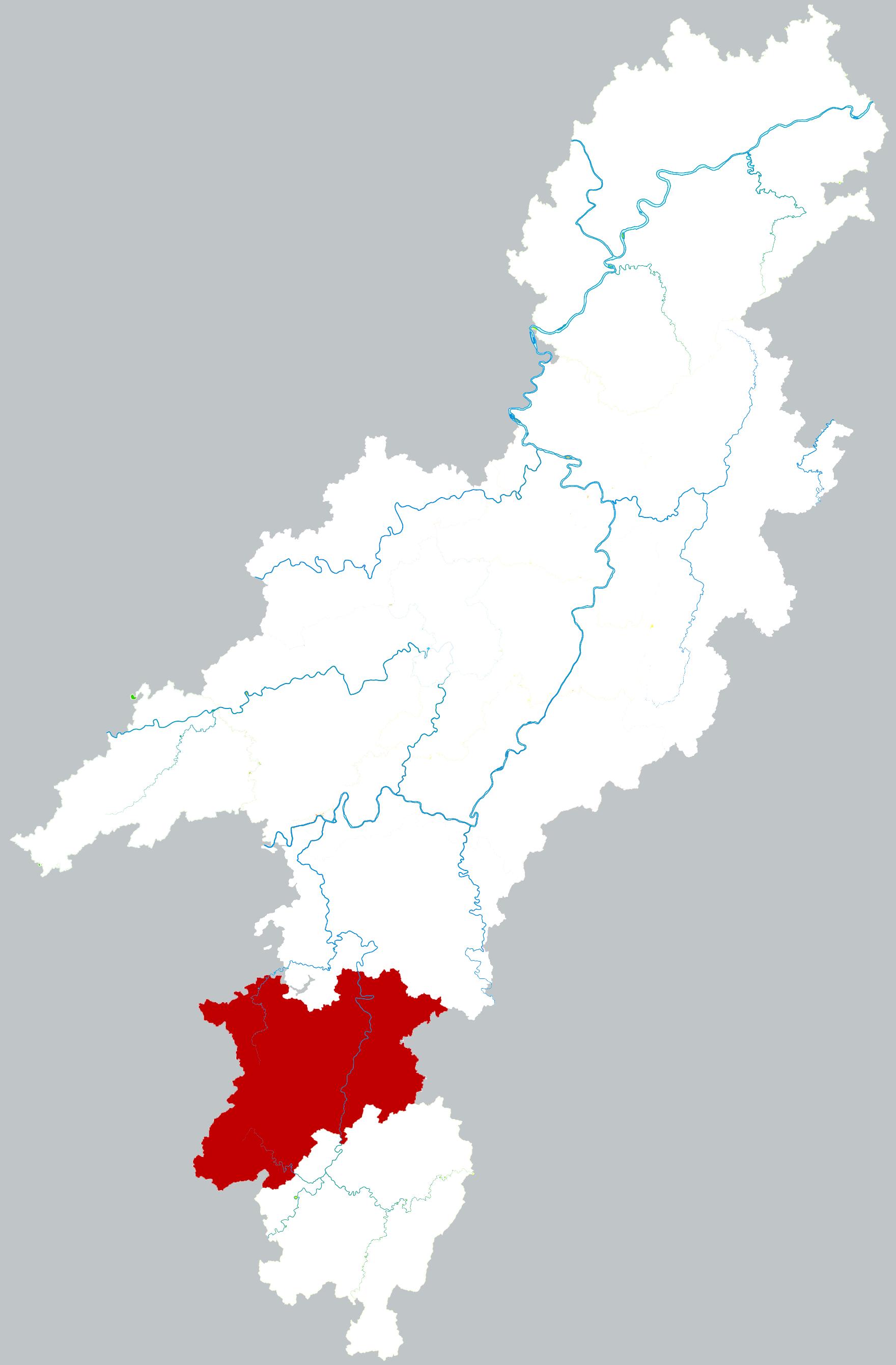
- Location of Jingzhou Miao and Dong Autonomous County within Huaihua

- Location in Hunan
- Coordinates: 26°34′26″N 109°41′42″E
- Country: People's Republic of China
- Province: Hunan
- Prefecture-level city: Huaihua
- County seat: Quyang

Area
  - Total: 2,210.56 km^{2} (853.50 sq mi)

Population (2010)
  - Total: 245,116
  - Density: 110.884/km^{2} (287.189/sq mi)
- Time zone: UTC+08:00 (China Standard)
- Postal code: 4184XX

Jingzhou Miao and Dong Autonomous County (simplified Chinese: 靖州苗族侗族自治县; traditional Chinese: 靖州苗族侗族自治縣; pinyin: Jìngzhōu Miáozú Dòngzú Zìzhìxiàn), usually referred to as Jingzhou County (靖州县; 靖州縣; Jìngzhōu Xiàn) or abbreviated just as Jingzhou, is an autonomous county of Miao and Dong peoples in Hunan Province, China. The county is under the administration of the prefecture-level city of Huaihua. It was known as "Jing County" (靖县; 靖縣; Jìng Xiàn), renamed to the present name on February 19, 1987.

Jingzhou is located on the southwestern margin of Hunan Province, adjacent to Guizhou Province. It borders Jinping, Liping and Tianzhu Counties of Guizhou to the west, Tongdao County to the south, Suining County to the east, and Huitong County to the north. The county covers 2,210 km^{2} (850 sq mi), and as of 2015, it had a registered population of 271,403 and a resident population of 253,000. The county has six towns and five townships under its jurisdiction, and the county seat is the town of Quyang (渠阳镇).

== Etymology ==
The name "Jingzhou" appears on official papers dated 1103, when the local leader Yang Shengzhen (杨晟臻) has allegiance to the Song Empire (960–1279). "Jing" means "pacify" and "zhou" means "prefecture".

== History ==
According to the unearthed cultural relics, human habitation in Jingzhou Miao and Dong Autonomous County dates back the Paleolithic Age.

During the Xia, Shang and Zhou dynasties (2070 BC–256 BC), it belonged to Jingzhou (荆州).

During the Spring and Autumn period (722 BC–476 BC), Jingzhou Miao and Dong Autonomous County was under the rule of the state of Chu (1115 BC–223 BC).

The Qin dynasty (221 BC–207 BC) unified China in 221 BC. With the implementation of the system of prefectures and counties, Jingzhou Miao and Dong Autonomous County belonged to Qianzhongjun (黔中郡).

From the Han dynasty (206 BC–220 AD) to Western Jin dynasty (265–317), it came under the jurisdiction of Tancheng County (镡成县) of Wulingjun (武陵郡).

The territory of Jingzhou Miao and Dong Autonomous County has been governed by the Eastern Jin dynasty (317–420), Liu Song dynasty (420–479), Southern Qi dynasty (479–502), Liang dynasty (502–557) and Chen dynasty (557–589).

In 581, Emperor Wen of Sui established the Sui Empire (581–618), it was under the jurisdiction of Longbiao County (龙标县) of Yuanlingjun (沅陵郡).

In the Tang dynasty (618–907), it was under the jurisdiction of Langxi County (朗溪县) of Xuzhou (叙州).

In 911, during the Five Dynasties and Ten Kingdoms period (907–960), Ma Yin commissioned Lü Shizhou (吕师周) to conquer the region, the local leader Yang Zaisi led the army to surrender. But Yang's descendants set up a self-government authority in the region soon.

In 1076, Emperor Shenzong of Song sent soldiers to seize the region and established "Chengzhou" (诚州) in 1081. In the next year, the imperial court established Quyang County (渠阳县) out of Yuanzhou (沅州) and it used to be in the territory of Chengzhou. In 1103, the local leader Yang Shengzhen (杨晟臻) has allegiance to the Song Empire (960–1279) and the imperial court renamed the region "Jingzhou" (靖州). In 1138, Quyang County was renamed Yongping County (永平县). The zhou (prefecture) ruled three counties including Yongping, Huitong and Tongdao. From 1167 to 1176, the exploitation and injustice policy sparked off a major rebellion.

The Mongol Yuan Empire (1271–1368) set up province system to maintain control of the vast region. Jingzhou was renamed Jingzhoulu (靖州路). In 1346, Wu Tianbao (吴天保) and Yang Liuzong (杨留总), both headers of Miao people, rose up in national rebellion against Mongol occupation. The central government put down the rebellion three years later.

In the Ming dynasty (1368–1644), Jingzhou ruled four counties including Huitong, Tongdao, Suining and Tianzhu.

In the Manchu Qing dynasty (1644–1911), Jingzhou came under the jurisdiction of Hunan-Guangdong Provinces (湖广布政使司). In 1698, Wu Guangdan (吴光旦), a header of Li people, staged a massive uprising and killed the local military leader Li Chenggong (李成功).

The Qing dynasty (1644–1911) collapsed in 1911 and was replaced by the Republic of China. Jingzhou was changed to a county named "Jing County" (靖县) and belonged to Hunan Province.

In March 1950, the CPC Jing County Committee was founded and Guo Zhiquan (郭之泉) served as the Party chief. In October, the People's Government of Jing County was set up. Li Shu (李树) was appointed county magistrate and Cao Zhenjia (曹振家) and Ming Yilun (明一轮) were appointed deputy county magistrate. It was under the jurisdiction of Huitong Zhuanqu (会同专区) from January 1950 to August 1952, Zhijiang Zhuanqu (芷江专区) from August 1952 to December 1952 and Qianyang Zhuanqu (黔阳专区) from December 1952 to March 1959. On March 28, 1959, Jing County and Tongdao County merged into one named "Tongdao County". On July 1, 1961, Jing County was split from Tongdao County. In June 1981, Qianyang Zhuanqu was renamed "Huaihua Diqu" (怀化地区), Jing County belonged to it. On February 19, 1987, the Jingzhou Miao and Dong Autonomous County was set up with the approval of the State Council.

== Administrative divisions ==
As of October 2015, Jingzhou Miao and Dong Autonomous County has five townships and six towns under its jurisdiction. The county seat is the town of Quyang.

Name	Chinese character	Population (2015)	Area (km^{2})	Notes
Aoshang	坳上镇	10,870	169.8	
Dabaozi	大堡子镇	21,000	176.44	
Gantang	甘棠镇	24,000	134.6	
Pingcha	平茶镇	11,000	160	
Quyang	渠阳镇	118,100	687.9	
Xinchang	新厂镇	24,500	188.38	
Outuan Township	藕团乡	9,000	150	
Sanqiao Township	三锹乡	5,000	174.23	
Taiyangping Township	太阳坪乡	12,235	88.78	
Wenxi Township	文溪乡	8,000	119	
Zhaiya Township	寨牙乡	7,756	136.4	

== Geography ==
Jingzhou Miao and Dong Autonomous County is located in the western Hunan province and southern Huaihua city. The county has a combined area of 2,211.8495 square kilometres (853.9999 sq mi). The county shares a border with the counties of Jinpin, Liping and Tianzhu to the west, Suining County to the east, Huitong County to the north, and Tongdao Dong Autonomous County to the south. The eastern and western sides of the county are mountainous areas, with basins in the middle and hills in the north.

=== Climate ===
Jingzhou Miao and Dong Autonomous County is in the subtropical monsoon climate zone, with an average annual temperature of 16.6 °C (61.9 °F), total annual rainfall of 1,371.3 millimetres (53.99 in), a frost-free period of 290 days and annual average sunshine hours in 1336 hours.

Climate data for Jingzhou, elevation 320 m (1,050 ft), (1991–2020 normals, extremes 1991–present)
Month	Jan	Feb	Mar	Apr	May	Jun	Jul	Aug	Sep	Oct	Nov	Dec	Year
Record high °C (°F)	25.2 (77.4)	29.6 (85.3)	31.1 (88.0)	34.4 (93.9)	35.9 (96.6)	36.4 (97.5)	38.2 (100.8)	39.0 (102.2)	38.9 (102.0)	35.9 (96.6)	30.7 (87.3)	25.8 (78.4)	39.0 (102.2)
Mean daily maximum °C (°F)	9.1 (48.4)	12.2 (54.0)	16.4 (61.5)	22.8 (73.0)	26.8 (80.2)	29.5 (85.1)	32.1 (89.8)	32.2 (90.0)	29.0 (84.2)	23.1 (73.6)	17.9 (64.2)	12.0 (53.6)	21.9 (71.5)
Daily mean °C (°F)	5.4 (41.7)	8.0 (46.4)	11.9 (53.4)	17.7 (63.9)	21.8 (71.2)	25.1 (77.2)	27.3 (81.1)	26.6 (79.9)	23.2 (73.8)	17.9 (64.2)	12.7 (54.9)	7.4 (45.3)	17.1 (62.7)
Mean daily minimum °C (°F)	3.1 (37.6)	5.3 (41.5)	8.9 (48.0)	14.2 (57.6)	18.2 (64.8)	22.0 (71.6)	23.7 (74.7)	22.8 (73.0)	19.4 (66.9)	14.6 (58.3)	9.4 (48.9)	4.4 (39.9)	13.8 (56.9)
Record low °C (°F)	−4.9 (23.2)	−5.0 (23.0)	−0.9 (30.4)	2.1 (35.8)	10.3 (50.5)	14.6 (58.3)	17.8 (64.0)	16.3 (61.3)	11.4 (52.5)	3.6 (38.5)	−1.7 (28.9)	−6.7 (19.9)	−6.7 (19.9)
Average precipitation mm (inches)	65.4 (2.57)	69.8 (2.75)	113.2 (4.46)	144.4 (5.69)	203.0 (7.99)	228.8 (9.01)	173.3 (6.82)	123.7 (4.87)	72.0 (2.83)	90.6 (3.57)	66.8 (2.63)	54.3 (2.14)	1,405.3 (55.33)
Average precipitation days (≥ 0.1 mm)	16.3	15.3	19.2	17.8	17.1	15.7	12.0	12.4	9.8	12.3	12.1	12.3	172.3
Average snowy days	3.9	2.0	0.5	0	0	0	0	0	0	0	0.1	1.2	7.7
Average relative humidity (%)	84	82	84	82	82	83	79	81	81	83	83	82	82
Mean monthly sunshine hours	38.1	48.3	59.9	92.8	111.1	110.8	189.9	181.3	136.7	98.5	84.7	66.4	1,218.5
Percentage possible sunshine	12	15	16	24	27	27	45	45	37	28	26	21	27
Source: China Meteorological Administration

=== Rivers ===
There are 101 rivers and streams in the county. The Qushui River (渠水) is the largest river in the county and it has 42 tributaries.

=== Lakes and reservoirs ===
There are 50 reservoirs and lakes in Jingzhou Miao and Dong Autonomous County.

=== Mountains ===
There are more than nine mountains over 1,000 metres (3,300 ft) above sea level in this county. Mount Qingdian (青靛山) is the highest point in the county, which, at 1,178 metres (3,865 ft) above sea level. The lowest point is Lack Xian (咸池), which stands 278 metres (912 ft) above sea level.

== Demographics ==
The population of Jingzhou Miao and Dong Autonomous County, according to the 2017 census, is 275,128, of which 70,550 were urban population, 20,4578 were rural population.

Historical population
Year	Pop.	±%
1949	85,243	—
1953	93,280	+9.4%
1964	122,456	+31.3%
1988	218,286	+78.3%
1990	231,942	+6.3%
2000	255,132	+10.0%
2004	261,700	+2.6%
2006	260,358	−0.5%
2017	275,128	+5.7%

According to the 2006 Census, the ethnic makeup of Jingzhou Miao and Dong Autonomous County included: 67,693 Dong people (26%), 122,368 Miao people (47%), 489 Hui people (0.19%), 315 Tujia people (0.12%), and 116 Yao people (0.04%).

=== Language ===
Mandarin is the official language. The local people speak Kam language, Hmongic languages, and Dungan language.

=== Religion ===
The Dong and Miao people believe in animism and worship ancestors. Buddhism is the earliest foreign religion introduced in the county. Islam spread as Hui people moved into the area.

== Education ==
By the end of 2017, Jingzhou Miao and Dong Autonomous County had one county vocational secondary school, 15 high schools and middle schools, and 15 primary schools.

== Transportation ==
=== Highway ===
The G65 Baotou–Maoming Expressway is a north–south highway passing through the county's downtown, commercial, and industrial districts in the eastern part of the county.

The National Highway G209, also popularly known as G209, is a north–south highway passing through commercial and residential districts center of the county limits.

The Provincial Highway S222, more commonly known as "S222", passes through the county leading northeastward to Huitong County and southwestward to Liping County.

The Provincial Highway S221, commonly abbreviated as "S221", runs south-east through Quyang Town and Zhaiya Township.

=== Rail ===
The Jiaozuo–Liuzhou railway runs north–south through the county's downtown, commercial, and industrial districts.

== Tourism ==
The famous natural landscapes of Jingzhou Miao and Dong Autonomous County are: Mount Fei, National Forest Park of Mount Paiya (排牙山国家森林公园), and Mount Jiulong (九龙山; 'Nine Dragons Mountain'). Major Buddhist temples in the county include Yanshou Temple (延寿寺), Fangguang Temple (方广寺), Wufeng Temple (五峰寺), Qingyun Temple (青云寺), and Guixiang Temple (桂香寺). Major Taoist temples in the county include Temple of Wu (武庙) and Feishan Temple (飞山庙). There are famous academies in the county include Zuoxin Academy (作新书院), Heshan Academy (鹤山书院) and Ziyang Academy (紫阳书院).
