= Sanjiang, Qiandongnan =

Sanjiang 三江镇
- Town
- Interactive map of Sanjiang
- Coordinates: 26°40′35″N 109°11′30″E
- Country: People's Republic of China
- Province: Guizhou
- Autonomous prefecture: Qiandongnan
- County: Jinping
- Village-level divisions: 4 residential communities 20 villages
- Elevation: 324 m (1,063 ft)
- Time zone: UTC+8 (China Standard)
- Area code: 0855

Sanjiang (Chinese: 三江; pinyin: Sānjiāng; lit. 'three rivers') is a town and the seat of Jinping County, in southeastern Guizhou province, China, located in the northeast of the county along the Qingshui River. As of 2011, it has four residential communities (社区) and 20 villages under its administration.

== See also ==
- List of township-level divisions of Guizhou
