= Hongzhou Town =

Town in Guizhou, China

Hongzhou 洪州镇
- Town
- Location in Guizhou
- Coordinates: 26.1263°N 109.4101°E
- Country: People's Republic of China
- Province: Guizhou
- Autonomous prefecture: Qiandongnan
- County: Liping County
- Time zone: UTC+8 (China Standard)

Hongzhou (Chinese: 洪州镇) is a town in Liping County, Guizhou, China.

== See also ==
- List of township-level divisions of Guizhou
