= Qiandongnan Liping Airport =

Qiandongnan Liping Airport 黔东南黎平机场
- IATA: HZH; ICAO: ZUNP

Summary
- Airport type: Public
- Serves: Liping County, Guizhou
- Coordinates: 26°19′22″N 109°09′06″E

Map
- Location of airport in Guizhou

Runways
Direction	Length		Surface
Direction	m	ft	Surface
06/24	2,200	7,218	Concrete

Statistics (2021)
- Passengers: 50,456
- Aircraft movements: 10,004

Qiandongnan Liping Airport
- Simplified Chinese: 黔东南黎平机场
- Traditional Chinese: 黔東南黎平機場
Transcriptions
Standard Mandarin
- Hanyu Pinyin: Qiándōngnán Lípíng Jīchǎng

Qiandongnan Liping Airport (IATA: HZH, ICAO: ZUNP) is an airport serving Liping County, part of the Qiandongnan Miao and Dong Autonomous Prefecture in Guizhou Province, China. Liping Airport was renamed to Qiandongnan Liping Airport at 2024. The airport cost ¥240 million to build and was opened on November 6, 2005.

== History ==
Construction on the airport officially began in April 2001. In September 2005, a test flights was completed by crews from China Southern Airlines. The airport was officially inaugurated on 6 November 2005. With a total investment of ¥240 million, it became Guizhou's fourth civilian regional airport, following Tongren, Xingyi, and Anshun airports.

Nearly one year after it began operations, the airport officially welcomed its first scheduled flight on September 25, 2006. China Express Airlines signed a formal agreement with the People's Government of Qiandongnan Prefecture to launch scheduled flights between Guiyang and Liping, effective September 25, 2006.

In 2024, the airport received approval from the Ministry of Civil Affairs to change its name. This name change complied with new regulations issued and implemented by the Civil Aviation Administration of China in 2023.

== Facilities ==
The airport terminal covers an area of approximately 3,000 square meters and has one runway that is 2,200 meters long and 45 meters wide, with a 300-meter safety zone at each end. The airport has three parking facilities. It takes a 20-minute drive from the airport to the city. In 2020, the airport handled 38,000 passengers.

== See also ==
- List of airports in China
- List of the busiest airports in China
