= Shuangjiang, Tongdao =

Town in Tongdao County, Hunan, China

Coordinates: 26°9′23″N 109°46′37″E

Shuangjiang 双江镇
- Town
- Interactive map of Shuangjiang
- Country: China
- Province: Hunan
- Autonomous county: Tongdao
- Subdivisions: 19: 3 residential communities 16 administrative villages

Shuangjing Town (Chinese: 双江镇; pinyin: Shuāngjiāng Zhèn) is a town and the county seat of Tongdao Dong Autonomous County in Hunan, China. The town is located in the mid-eastern region of the county. It was reformed to merge Malong Township (Chinese: 马龙乡), Chuansu Yao ethnic Township (Chinese: 传素瑶族乡) and the former Shuangjing Town on November 25, 2015. It has an area of 238.69 km^{2} (92.16 sq mi) with a population of 48,000 (as of 2015 end). The seat of local government is at Zhaishang Village.(Chinese: 寨上村)
