= Mieu people =

Mieu
Regions with significant populations
- Northern Vietnam: Cao Bằng, Lạng Sơn, Bắc Giang Provinces

Languages
- Ná-Meo, Tày, Vietnamese

Religion
- Animism

The Mieu people (aka Na Mieu, Na Mieo) live in the mountains of northern Vietnam. They are considered by the government of Vietnam to be a subgroup of the Hmong people and therefore not one of the 54 recognized ethnicities in Vietnam. However, the Mieu reject this and see themselves as a distinct ethnicity.

== Origin and 'Loss of Country' ==
According to Mieu folk songs (tu siv) the Mieu people descended from immigrants from southern China. They are said to have had their own kingdom in Liuzhou, near Guilin in Guangxi. They rose up in arms to the invasion, oppression, and exploitation they faced from the Manchus and Han Chinese. When a large force was sent to destroy this resistance, the Mieu fled to Vietnam.

== Language ==
Like Hmong dialects, the Mieu language is also a member of Miao languages. It is officially classified as a Hmong dialect by Vietnamese linguists. However, they are neither intelligible with Hmong nor Xong, due to significant difference in vocabulary and accent. Their language might be a member of Hmu (Qiandong Miao, gheis Hmub - hveb Qeef dongb), most possibly the Southern Qiandong Miao [hms] language.

The Mieu were mainly monolingual until around 1954. During this time they had little contact with other ethnic groups except for some Mieu men who went to markets. Especially since 1968, when many Mieu were resettled to foothills to practice wet rice cultivation, more of them became fluent in Tay. When the resources of the central state to reach out to mountainous areas and the ethnic minorities there increased, Vietnamese became more dominant.

The Mieu do not have any writing system. The proposed Hmong script was rejected as not suitable for Mieu language. The Chinese Qiandong Miao Latin Alphabet might be suitable to them, which is based on Northern Qiandong Miao [hea].

Na Mieu is the sole non-Hmong Miao-speaking people outside China.

== Music ==
Tu Siv, Mieu folk songs, are used to pass on knowledge of history. The most notable one is Siv Pax Quan (Loss of Country). It is sung during weddings, new year celebrations, when entering a new house, and so on.
