= Wenxi, Jingzhou County =

Wenxi Township
- Township

Chinese transcription(s)
  - Simplified: 文溪乡
  - Traditional: 文溪鄉
  - Pinyin: Wénxī Xiāng
- Location in Hunan
- Coordinates: 26°39′38″N 109°51′13″E
- Country: China
- Province: Hunan
- Prefecture: Huaihua
- Autonomous county: Jingzhou Miao and Dong Autonomous County

Area
  - Total: 119 km^{2} (46 sq mi)

Population (2017)
  - Total: 8,000
  - Density: 67/km^{2} (170/sq mi)
- Time zone: UTC+8 (China Standard)
- Postal code: 418404
- Area code: 0745

Wenxi Township (Chinese: 文溪乡) is a rural township in Jingzhou Miao and Dong Autonomous County, Hunan, China. As of the 2017 census it had a population of 8,000 and an area of 119 square kilometres (46 sq mi). Miao and Dong people accounted for 37.5% and 37.5% of the total population respectively. It is surrounded by Shaxi Township of Huitong County on the northeast, Gantang Town on the northwest, Quyang Town on the southwest, Suining County on the southeast, and Zhaiya Township on the south.

== History ==
After the establishment of the Communist State in 1950, Wenxi Township was set up. In 1958 it was renamed "Wenxi People's Commune". It restored the original name in 1984.

== Administrative division ==
As of 2017, the township is divided into 13 villages: Lijiajie (Chinese: 李家界村), Shangbao (Chinese: 上宝村), Changxi (Chinese: 长溪村), Baojiang (Chinese: 宝江村), Hongling (Chinese: 红陵村), Baochong (Chinese: 宝冲村), Jinma (Chinese: 金马村), Langxi (Chinese: 朗溪村), Wenpo (Chinese: 文坡村), Wenxi (Chinese: 文溪村), Xicun (Chinese: 西村村), Shuitun (Chinese: 水屯村), and Xiabao (Chinese: 下宝村).

== Geography ==
The Muli River (Chinese: 木栗河) flows through the town southwest to northeast.

Mountains located adjacent to and visible from the townsite are: Mount Hongling (鸿岭山; 1,133 metres (3,717 ft)), Mount Huanglian (黄连山; 742 metres (2,434 ft)) and Mount Dabaiyi (大白衣; 953 metres (3,127 ft)).

== Economy ==
The township's economy is based on nearby mineral resources and agricultural resources. Mineral resources include gold, alum and manganese. Gastrodia elata, wolfiporia extensa and edible mushroom are the economic crops in the township.

== Transportation ==
The Provincial Highway S222 passes across the town northeast to southwest.
