= Quyang, Hunan =

Quyang Town 渠阳镇
- Town
- Location in Hunan
- Coordinates: 26°34′32″N 109°42′03″E
- Country: People's Republic of China
- Province: Hunan
- Prefecture: Huaihua
- Autonomous county: Jingzhou Miao and Dong Autonomous County

Area
  - Total: 687.9 km^{2} (265.6 sq mi)

Population (2015)
  - Total: 118,100
  - Density: 171.7/km^{2} (444.7/sq mi)
- Time zone: UTC+8 (China Standard)
- Postal code: 418000
- Area code: 0745

Quyang (simplified Chinese: 渠阳镇; traditional Chinese: 渠陽鎮; pinyin: Qúyáng Zhèn) is an urban town and the county seat of Jingzhou Miao and Dong Autonomous County in Hunan, China. The town is located in the south central region of the county. As of the 2015 census it had a population of 118,100 and an area of 687.9 square kilometres (265.6 sq mi). Its seat of local government is at Tuqiaojie Community (土桥街社区). The town is bordered to the north by Taiyangping Township, to the northwest by Aoshang Town, to the northeast by Wenxi Township, to the south by Xinchang Town, to the southwest by Outuan Township, and to the west by Sanqiao Township.

== History ==
It was reformed to merge Pukpou Township (铺口乡), Hengjiangqiao Township (横江桥乡) and the former Quyang Town on November 25, 2015.

== Administrative division ==
As of 2015, the town is divided into 8 communities and 61 villages.

== Geography ==
There are a number of popular mountains located immediately adjacent to the townsite which include Mount Qingdian (青靛山; 1,173-metre (3,848 ft)); Mount Fei (飞山; 720-metre (2,360 ft)); Mount Fengmu (枫木山; 998-metre (3,274 ft)); Mount Wubaijiao (五佰角; 693-metre (2,274 ft)); Mount Dalaogu (大老古; 888-metre (2,913 ft)) and Mount Mayipo (蚂蚁坡; 708-metre (2,323 ft)).

There are 27 reservoirs in the town, such as Shuiniangtang Reservoir, Ma'andong Reservoir, Jinmai Reservoir, and Feishan Reservoir.

There are two major rivers flow through the town, namely Diling River (地灵河) and Qushui River (渠水).

== Economy ==
The local economy is primarily based upon agriculture, mineral resources and local industry. The region abounds with manganese and alum.

== Transport ==
The National Highway G209 and G65 Baotou–Maoming Expressway pass across the town south to north.

The Provincial Highway S222 passes across the town west to east.

The Provincial Highway S221 terminates at the town.

The Jiaozuo–Liuzhou railway passes across the town north to south.
