= Tràng Định district =

Tràng Định District Huyện Tràng Định
- District
- Interactive map of Tràng Định District
- Country: Vietnam
- Region: Northeast
- Province: Lạng Sơn
- Capital: Thất Khê

Area
  - Total: 384 sq mi (995 km^{2})

Population (2003)
  - Total: 62,869
- Time zone: UTC+7 (Indochina Time)

Tràng Định is a former rural district of Lạng Sơn province in the Northeastern region of Vietnam. As of 2003, the district had a population of 62,869. The district covers an area of 995 km^{2} (384 sq mi). The district capital lies at Thất Khê.

== Administrative divisions ==
1 town: Thất Khê

22 communes: Khánh Long, Đoàn Kết, Cao Minh, Tân Yên, Vĩnh Tiến, Tân Tiến, Bắc Ái, Kim Đồng, Chí Minh, Chi Lăng, Đề Thám, Hùng Sơn Hùng Việt, Kháng Chiến, Đại Đồng, Tri Phương, Quốc Khánh, Đội Cấn, Tân Minh, Trung Thành, Quốc Việt, Đào Viên

== Climate ==
Climate data for Thất Khê, Tràng Định District, elevation 275 m (902 ft)
Month	Jan	Feb	Mar	Apr	May	Jun	Jul	Aug	Sep	Oct	Nov	Dec	Year
Record high °C (°F)	31.1 (88.0)	35.6 (96.1)	36.8 (98.2)	38.5 (101.3)	39.6 (103.3)	39.3 (102.7)	38.7 (101.7)	38.7 (101.7)	37.5 (99.5)	36.0 (96.8)	33.8 (92.8)	31.1 (88.0)	39.6 (103.3)
Mean daily maximum °C (°F)	18.0 (64.4)	19.5 (67.1)	22.5 (72.5)	27.3 (81.1)	31.2 (88.2)	32.4 (90.3)	32.7 (90.9)	32.4 (90.3)	31.3 (88.3)	28.4 (83.1)	24.5 (76.1)	20.6 (69.1)	26.7 (80.1)
Daily mean °C (°F)	13.6 (56.5)	15.3 (59.5)	18.6 (65.5)	22.9 (73.2)	26.0 (78.8)	27.4 (81.3)	27.6 (81.7)	27.2 (81.0)	25.8 (78.4)	22.9 (73.2)	18.9 (66.0)	15.0 (59.0)	21.8 (71.2)
Mean daily minimum °C (°F)	10.9 (51.6)	12.8 (55.0)	16.1 (61.0)	19.9 (67.8)	22.6 (72.7)	24.2 (75.6)	24.5 (76.1)	24.2 (75.6)	22.6 (72.7)	19.6 (67.3)	15.5 (59.9)	11.6 (52.9)	18.7 (65.7)
Record low °C (°F)	−1.8 (28.8)	2.6 (36.7)	3.4 (38.1)	9.6 (49.3)	13.9 (57.0)	16.2 (61.2)	19.2 (66.6)	19.5 (67.1)	14.4 (57.9)	6.3 (43.3)	2.4 (36.3)	−1.4 (29.5)	−1.8 (28.8)
Average precipitation mm (inches)	39.1 (1.54)	35.7 (1.41)	57.3 (2.26)	98.7 (3.89)	193.4 (7.61)	250.0 (9.84)	250.8 (9.87)	261.0 (10.28)	142.5 (5.61)	82.8 (3.26)	49.1 (1.93)	29.9 (1.18)	1,487.8 (58.57)
Average rainy days	10.9	10.5	13.2	12.5	12.3	14.7	15.1	15.3	10.7	8.0	7.2	7.2	139.4
Average relative humidity (%)	83.2	83.8	84.6	84.2	83.0	84.1	85.0	85.8	84.7	83.4	82.8	81.9	83.9
Mean monthly sunshine hours	60.4	53.5	54.6	93.1	152.3	148.7	168.2	173.7	164.6	139.4	120.3	108.6	1,435.8
Source: Vietnam Institute for Building Science and Technology
