= Xinchang, Jingzhou County =

Xinchang Town
- Town

Chinese transcription(s)
  - Simplified: 新厂镇
  - Traditional: 新廠鎮
  - Pinyin: Xīnchǎng Zhèn
- Location in Hunan
- Coordinates: 26°21′44″N 109°28′16″E
- Country: China
- Province: Hunan
- Prefecture: Huaihua
- Autonomous county: Jingzhou Miao and Dong Autonomous County

Area
  - Total: 188.38 km^{2} (72.73 sq mi)

Population (2017)
  - Total: 24,500
  - Density: 130/km^{2} (337/sq mi)
- Time zone: UTC+8 (China Standard)
- Postal code: 418409
- Area code: 0745

Xinchang (Chinese: 新厂镇) is a rural town in Jingzhou Miao and Dong Autonomous County, Hunan, China. As of the 2017 census it had a population of 24,500 and an area of 188.38 square kilometres (72.73 sq mi). The town is bordered to the northwest by Outuan Township, to the east by Xianxi Town, to the south by Boyang Town, to the west by Pingcha Town, and to the northeast by Quyang Town.

== History ==
In 1995 it was upgraded to a town.

== Administrative division ==
As of 2017, the town is divided into sixteen villages: Xinchang (Chinese: 新厂村), Paotuan (Chinese: 炮团村), Yaojia (Chinese: 姚家村), Mujia (Chinese: 穆家村), Xiaoduan (Chinese: 小段村), Jinxing (Chinese: 金星村), Huangpu (Chinese: 皇甫村), Shanli (Chinese: 善理村), Heping (Chinese: 和平村), Qintuan (Chinese: 覃团村), Shaotuan (Chinese: 哨团村), Yantuan (Chinese: 燕团村), Dijiao (Chinese: 地交村), Chongnen (Chinese: 冲嫩村), Yingzhai (Chinese: 营寨村), Baya (Chinese: 八亚村), and one community: Xinchang Community (Chinese: 新厂居委会).

== Geography ==
The Sixiang River (Chinese: 四乡河) passes through the town.

The Dingdong Reservoir (Chinese: 丁洞水库) is the largest body of water in the town.

Mountains located adjacent to and visible from the townsite are: Mount Jian (尖山; 757-metre (2,484 ft)) and Mount Lujiapo (陆家坡; 1,038-metre (3,406 ft)).

== Economy ==
The local economy is primarily based upon agriculture and local industry. The main crops are rice, sweet potato and maize.

== Attractions ==
The landscape of the water-eroded cave is a famous scenic spot in the town.
