= Đoàn Kết, Lạng Sơn =

Commune in Lạng Sơn Province, Vietnam

Coordinates: 22°22′08″N 106°13′56″E

Đoàn Kết (xã Đoàn Kết) is a commune in Lạng Sơn Province, Vietnam.

On June 16, 2025, the Standing Committee of the National Assembly issued Resolution No. 1672/NQ-UBTVQH15 on the rearrangement of commune-level administrative units in Lạng Sơn Province in 2025. Accordingly, the entire natural area and population size of the communes of Khánh Long, Cao Minh, and Đoàn Kết were reorganized to form a new commune named Đoàn Kết.

Đoàn Kết has a population of 1109 (1997) in 8 villages. 64% of the population are Mieu (officially a subgroup of the Hmong) and most of the rest Yao and Tay, with a very small Nung minority.

The 8 villages of Đoàn Kết Commune are as follows (Nguyen 2007:3).

- Vàng Can
- Khuổi Vai
- Khuổi Lài (ethnically mixed village)
- Khuổi Lập
- Khuổi Giảo (largest village; includes Khuổi Giảo, Khuổi Lài, and Khuổi Hẻo hamlets)
- Khuổi Lứng (predominantly Yao)
- Khuổi Tó
- Kéo Đanh (predominantly Yao)
