= Aoshang (Jingzhou County) =

- Town

Chinese transcription(s)
  - Simplified: 坳上镇
  - Traditional: 坳上鎮
  - Pinyin: Àoshàng Zhèn
- Location in Hunan
- Coordinates: 26°39′37″N 109°36′24″E
- Country: China
- Province: Hunan
- Prefecture: Huaihua
- Autonomous county: Jingzhou Miao and Dong Autonomous County

Area
  - Total: 169.8 km^{2} (65.6 sq mi)

Population (2017)
  - Total: 10,870
  - Density: 64.02/km^{2} (165.8/sq mi)
- Time zone: UTC+8 (China Standard)
- Postal code: 418408
- Area code: 0745

Aoshang (Chinese: 坳上镇) is a rural town in Jingzhou Miao and Dong Autonomous County, Hunan, China. As of the 2017 census it had a population of 10,870 and an area of 169.8 square kilometres (65.6 sq mi). The town is mainly inhabited by Han, Dong and Miao people. Dong and Miao accounted for 41.7% and 33.3% respectively. It is surrounded by Diling Township on the north, Taiyangping Township on the northeast, Sanqiao Township on the southwest, Dabaozi Town on the northwest, and Quyang Town on the south.

== History ==
After the establishment of the Communist State in 1950, Aoshang was known as "West District" (Chinese: 西区). In 1953 Aoshang Township was established. In 1958 it was renamed "Aoshang People's Commune". It was upgraded to a town in December 1995.

== Administrative division ==
As of December 2017, the town is divided into 11 villages: Xiangshui (Chinese: 响水村), Yangmei (Chinese: 杨梅村), Xianfeng (Chinese: 先锋村), Xiaokai (Chinese: 小开村), Dakai (Chinese: 大开村), Aoshang (Chinese: 坳上村), Xinhua (Chinese: 新华村), Donglin (Chinese: 东林村), Jiulong (Chinese: 九龙村), Qiaotou (Chinese: 桥头村), Geying (Chinese: 戈盈村), and 1 community: Aoshang (Chinese: 坳上居委会).

== Geography ==
The Diling River (Chinese: 地灵河) passes through the town south to north.

== Economy ==
The town's economy is based on nearby mineral resources and agricultural resources. Mineral resources include gold, zinc, aluminium and antimony.

== Transportation ==
The National Highway G209 passes across the town south to north.
