= Liping County =

Liping County 黎平县
- County
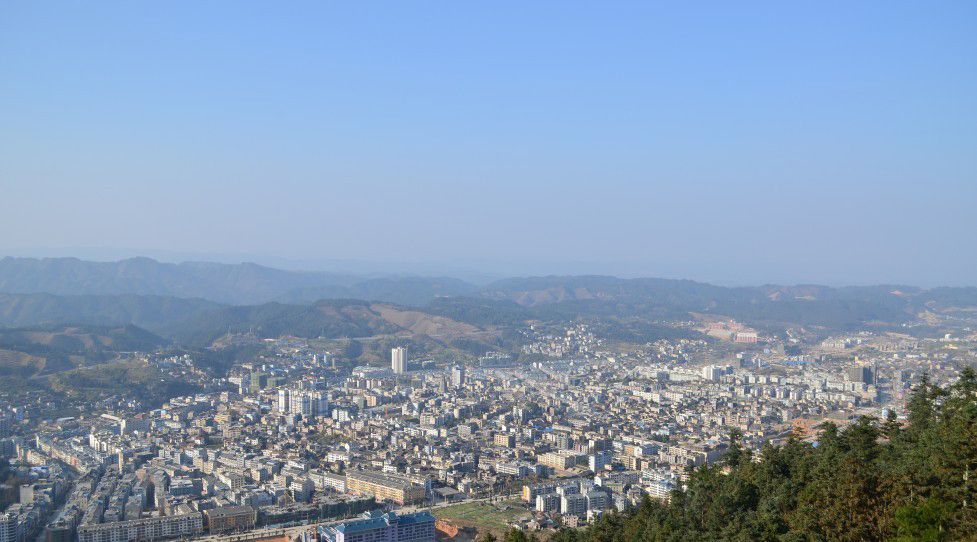

- Location of the seat in Guizhou Liping (Southwest China)
- Coordinates (Liping County government): 26°12′46″N 109°07′34″E
- Country: China
- Province: Guizhou
- Autonomous prefecture: Qiandongnan
- Township-level divisions: 3 subdistricts; 14 towns; 7 townships; 2 Ethnic townships
- County seat: Defeng Subdistrict (zh:德凤街道)

Area
  - Total: 4,439 km^{2} (1,714 sq mi)

Population (2013)
  - Total: 538,294
  - Density: 121.3/km^{2} (314.1/sq mi)
- Time zone: UTC+8 (China Standard)
- Postal code: 557300
- Area code: 0855
- Website: www.liping.gov.cn

Liping County (Chinese: 黎平县; pinyin: Lípíng Xiàn) (Dong language: Liic bienc) is a county in the southeast of Guizhou province, China, bordering Hunan to the east and Guangxi to the southeast. It is part of the Qiandongnan Miao and Dong Autonomous Prefecture.

== History ==
The county was affected by the Miao rebellion of 1736-36. The county is home to many Dong people.

- 1322 (years to two years) set up a long lawsuit in Liping. The Liping government started to set up in 1413 to 1913, with a history of 500 years.
- In 1283, eighty thousand people in the ancient state of the military and civilian (ancient state, this Leigh Bing Rory). To rule for two years (in 1322), the abolition of Zongguan Fu, Li Ping Village renamed Liping Zhai, in Ping lawsuit change Liping lawsuit, jurisdiction over 12 executive our, Huguang province state think appease our thought state, this cengong), Li Pingshi name.
- On 1385, the abolition of Liping long lawsuit, built five Wei command division, military duct, administer 15 2 villages, 14 executive secretary. Ming Yongle eleven years (1413), the abolition of thinking, to appease our, suppose the Liping mansion in Liping village officer corps, attached to the Guizhou receives announcement administration to enable our, Tan Xi jurisdiction, eight boat, the ancient state, Cao drop Hou Fei, hung, drawn and ferro permanent from, Xishan Yang Dong (waste) seven executive our, implemented within civil military divide and conquer; Wu Kai Wei jurisdiction, Tun, Huguang.
- In 1441, Ming orthodox six years, the abolition of Froude from chief permanent, permanent set from the county, under the Liping government. 1582 (ten years of Ming Dynasty), Liping government to civilian house, cure five Wei, Chen Yuan to control road zhifu. In 1600 the Liping government under the Huguang Province, 1603 under the Guizhou.
- In 1730, a state Department of ancient Tongzhi, a house of Liping.
- In 1950, Liping County in Dushan area, Tuyun area in 1952, 1956 was placed under the Qiandongnan Miao and Dong Autonomous prefecture.
- 2013, Liping County, Guizhou Province, the people's government is set to the provincial governing county pilot.

== Administrative divisions ==
Liping County is divided into 2 subdistricts and 14 towns and 7 townships and 2 Ethnic townships. Defeng subdistrict is the county seat which houses Liping County Government and Liping County Council.

- Subdistricts: Defeng, Gaotun, Longxing
- Towns: Zhongchao, Hongzhou, Shuikou, Zhaoxing, Shangzhong, Mengyan, Jiuchao, Aoshi, Yandong, Shuangjiang, Long'e, Diping, Yongcong, Maogong
- Townships: Deshun, Dehua, Pingzhai, Dajia, Bazhai, Luoli, Koujiang
- Ethnic Townships: Shunhua, Leidong

English	Chinese	Area (km2)	Population(2013)	Seat	communities	Villages
Defeng Subdistrict	德凤街道	310	97238	Gongyuan community	17	6
Gaotun Subdistrict	高屯街道	282	31505	Gaotun community	4	9
Longxing Subdistrict	龙形街道					
Zhongchao Town	中潮镇	296	34582	Zhongchao Village		10
Hongzhou Town	洪州镇	301	29184	Hongzhou Village		11
Shuikou Town	水口镇	260	36869	Shuikou Village		18
Long'e Town	龙额镇	124	23802	Long'e Village		16
Zhaoxing Town	肇兴镇	133	22352	Zhaoxing Village		11
Yandong Town	岩洞镇	147	15221	Yandong Villages		6
Shuangjiang Town	双江镇	262	20057	Shuangjiang Village		9
Jiuchao Town	九潮镇	295	28805	Jiuchao Village		13
Mengyan Town	孟彦镇	184	19589	Mengyan Village		8
Aoshi Town	敖市镇	96	18298	Aoshi Village		7
Shangzhong Town	尚重镇	227	31572	Shangzhong Village		12
Maogong Town	茅贡镇	172	16845	Maogong Village		9
Yongcong Town	永从镇	157	18346	Yongcong Village		7
Diping Town	地坪镇	118	22142	Diping Village		10
Dehua Township	德化乡	104	10676	Dehua Village		6
Pingzhai Township	平寨乡	91	11645	Pingzhai Village		6
Djia Township	大稼乡	112	15234	Dajia Village		12
Luoli Township	罗里乡	166	17224	Luoli Village		8
Bazhai Township	坝寨乡	208	14568	Bazhai Village		7
Koujiang Township	口江乡	116	9572	Koujiang Village		6
Deshun Township	德顺乡	212	16340	Deshun Villages		7
Leidong Yao and Shui Ethnic Township	雷洞瑶族水族乡	82	12358	Leidong Village		12
Shunhua Yao Ethnic Township	顺化瑶族乡	59	5082	Shundong Village		4

== Climate ==
Climate data for Liping, elevation 569 m (1,867 ft), (1991–2020 normals, extremes 1981–2010)
Month	Jan	Feb	Mar	Apr	May	Jun	Jul	Aug	Sep	Oct	Nov	Dec	Year
Record high °C (°F)	23.5 (74.3)	28.5 (83.3)	33.1 (91.6)	32.7 (90.9)	32.9 (91.2)	35.3 (95.5)	36.2 (97.2)	37.5 (99.5)	36.4 (97.5)	33.3 (91.9)	28.5 (83.3)	24.8 (76.6)	37.5 (99.5)
Mean daily maximum °C (°F)	8.0 (46.4)	11.2 (52.2)	15.3 (59.5)	21.6 (70.9)	25.4 (77.7)	28.1 (82.6)	30.4 (86.7)	30.6 (87.1)	27.3 (81.1)	21.7 (71.1)	16.8 (62.2)	11.1 (52.0)	20.6 (69.1)
Daily mean °C (°F)	4.6 (40.3)	7.2 (45.0)	11.1 (52.0)	16.8 (62.2)	20.8 (69.4)	24.0 (75.2)	26.0 (78.8)	25.3 (77.5)	21.9 (71.4)	16.8 (62.2)	11.9 (53.4)	6.7 (44.1)	16.1 (61.0)
Mean daily minimum °C (°F)	2.4 (36.3)	4.6 (40.3)	8.2 (46.8)	13.4 (56.1)	17.4 (63.3)	21.1 (70.0)	22.8 (73.0)	21.8 (71.2)	18.3 (64.9)	13.6 (56.5)	8.6 (47.5)	3.8 (38.8)	13.0 (55.4)
Record low °C (°F)	−5.6 (21.9)	−6.1 (21.0)	−2.1 (28.2)	0.5 (32.9)	5.9 (42.6)	10.7 (51.3)	14.0 (57.2)	15.3 (59.5)	9.1 (48.4)	1.3 (34.3)	−2.7 (27.1)	−6.2 (20.8)	−6.2 (20.8)
Average precipitation mm (inches)	58.7 (2.31)	63.4 (2.50)	104.2 (4.10)	120.2 (4.73)	187.3 (7.37)	233.9 (9.21)	159.5 (6.28)	121.0 (4.76)	89.4 (3.52)	95.4 (3.76)	59.2 (2.33)	48.1 (1.89)	1,340.3 (52.76)
Average precipitation days (≥ 0.1 mm)	16.4	15.2	18.5	17.4	17.4	16.9	13.8	13.3	10.8	12.8	11.9	12.1	176.5
Average snowy days	4.4	2.4	0.7	0	0	0	0	0	0	0	0.1	1.3	8.9
Average relative humidity (%)	85	83	85	82	83	83	79	80	82	83	83	81	82
Mean monthly sunshine hours	37.1	46.5	59.4	91.0	111.3	102.7	171.3	171.4	130.0	98.2	88.9	73.5	1,181.3
Percentage possible sunshine	11	15	16	24	27	25	41	43	36	28	27	23	26
Source: China Meteorological Administration

== Education ==
=== Technical school ===
- Liping medium vocational technical school

=== Senior school ===
Liping County, a total of 5 high school, respectively, as follows

- Liping NO.1 Middle School
- Liping NO.3 Middle School
- Liping NO.4 Middle School
- Liping NO.7 Middle School
- Liping Hualong Middle School

=== Middle school ===
Liping County, a total of 25 Middle schools, respectively, as follows

- Liping NO.2 Middle School
- Liping NO.5 Middle School
- Liping NO.6 Middle School
- Liping Bazhai Middle School
- Liping Maogong Middle School
- Liping Jiuchao Middle School
- Liping Dajia Middle School
- Liping Mengyan Middle School
- Liping Shangzhong Middle School
- Liping Yudong Middle School
- Liping Luoli Middle School
- Liping Pingzhai Middle School
- Liping Dehua Middle School
- Liping Zhongchao Middle School
- Liping Aoshi Middle School
- Liping Hongzhou Middle School
- Liping Deshun Middle School
- Liping Yongcong Middle School
- Liping Yandong Middle School
- Liping Koujiang Middle School
- Liping Shuangjiang Middle School
- Liping Zhaoxing Middle School
- Liping Shuikou Middle School
- Liping Diping Middle School
- Liping Long'e Middle School

=== Primary school ===
Liping County, a total of more than 300 primary schools, including urban primary school has 9, respectively, as follows,

- Liping NO.1 Primary School
- Liping NO.2 Primary School
- Liping NO.3 Primary School
- Liping NO.4 Primary School
- Liping NO.5 Primary School
- Liping Nanquan Primary School
- Liping Xuejiaping Primary School
- Liping Minsheng Primary School
- Liping Luotuan Primary School

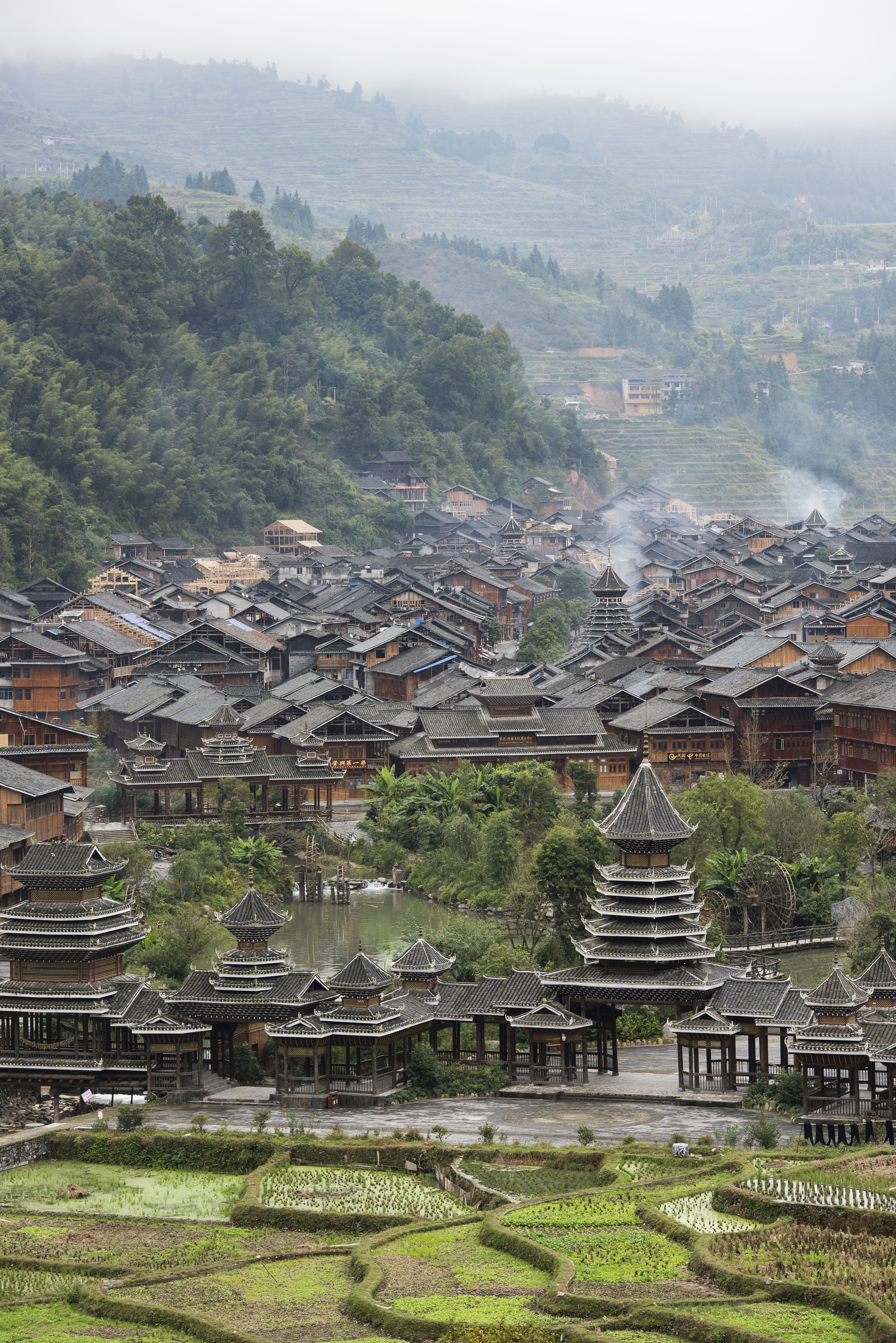
The Dong village of Zhaoxing, southern Liping

== Transportation ==
=== Road ===
- S308, S202, S222, S221
- G242, G356

=== Expressway ===
- G76
- Songtao–Congjiang Expressway
- Jingzhou–Liping Expressway

=== Railway ===
- Guiyang–Guangzhou High-Speed Railway-Congjiang Railway Station
- Xingyi-Yongzhou Railway-Liping Railway Station

=== Airport ===
Liping County is served by Liping Airport located at Gaotun Subdistrict and Defeng Subdistrict.
