= Jinping County, Guizhou =

Jinping County 锦屏县 Kinping
- County
- Location of the seat in Guizhou Jinping (Southwest China)
- Coordinates (Jinping County government): 26°40′34″N 109°12′01″E
- Country: China
- Province: Guizhou
- Autonomous prefecture: Qiandongnan
- County seat: Sanjiang

Area
  - Total: 1,596.9 km^{2} (616.6 sq mi)

Population (2010)
  - Total: 154,841
  - Density: 96.963/km^{2} (251.13/sq mi)
- Time zone: UTC+8 (China Standard)

Jinping County (simplified Chinese: 锦屏县; traditional Chinese: 錦屏縣; pinyin: Jǐnpíng Xiàn) is a county in the east of Guizhou province, China, bordering Hunan to the east. It is under the administration of the Qiandongnan Miao and Dong Autonomous Prefecture.

== Administrative divisions ==
Jinping County is divided into 7 towns and 8 townships:

towns

- Sanjiang 三江镇
- Maoping 茅坪镇
- Dunzhai 敦寨镇
- Qimeng 启蒙镇
- Pingqiu 平秋镇
- Tonggu 铜鼓镇
- Pinglüe 平略镇

townships

- Datong 大同乡
- Xinhua 新化乡
- Longli 隆里乡
- Zhongling 钟灵乡
- Ouli 偶里乡
- Guben 固本乡
- Hekou 河口乡
- Yandong 彦洞乡

== Languages ==
=== Dong ===
Dong (also known as the Kam language) is the most widely spoken non-Chinese language in Jinping County. The three main dialects of Dong are the Jiuzhai (九寨), Datong (大同), and Qimeng (启蒙) dialects (Tu & Yang 2008: 105).

- Jiuzhai dialect (九寨): Northern Dong, first lectal area. Spoken in Pingqiu (平秋镇), Kuidan (魁胆), Gaoba (髙坝), Huangmen (黄门), and Yandong (彦洞) townships. Representative dialect: Pisuo Village (皮所村) in Gaoba Township (髙坝乡).
- Datong dialect (大同): Northern Dong, third lectal area. Spoken in Datong (大同), Suijiang (稳江), and Xiudong (秀洞) townships. Representative dialect: Xiudong Village (秀洞村).
- Qimeng dialect (启蒙): Southern Dong, first lectal area. Spoken in Qimeng (启蒙镇), Juzhai (巨寨), and Shengli (胜利) townships. Representative dialect: Zhemeng Village (者蒙村) in Qimeng Town (启蒙镇).

=== Miao ===
Eastern Miao (also known as the Hmu language) is spoken as a first language by about 40,000 people in Jinping County. There are three main Miao dialects spoken in Jinping County, with their respective geographical distributions listed as follows (Tu & Yang 2008: 50).

1. Hekou (河口) dialect (10,000+ speakers)

- Qimeng District (启蒙区): Hekou (河口乡) and Wenniu (文牛乡) townships
- Pinglve District (平略区): Zhanghua Township (彰化乡)

2. Ouli (偶里) dialect (20,000+ speakers)

- Pinglve District (平略区): Pinglve (平略乡), Ouli (偶里乡), Zhaizao (寨早乡), and Jiaosan (皎三乡) townships
- Sanjiang District (三江区): Maoping (茅坪乡), Guazhi (挂治乡), Pingjin (平金乡), and Suijiang (稳江乡) townships
- Dunzhai District (敦寨区): Loujiang (娄江乡) and Tongpo (铜坡乡) townships

Note: Ouli has some notable internal dialectal differences. For example, the dialect spoken in Ouli has some differences from the dialect spoken in Loujiang (娄江), Tongpo (铜坡), and Suijiang (稳江).

3. Yuhe (裕河) dialect (about 3,000 speakers)

- Qimeng District (启蒙区): Yuhe (裕河乡), Xinmin (新民乡), and Guben (固本乡) townships

Note: Yuhe is the most divergent dialect.

== Climate ==
Climate data for Jinping, elevation 343 m (1,125 ft), (1991–2020 normals, extremes 1981–2010)
| Month | Jan | Feb | Mar | Apr | May | Jun | Jul | Aug | Sep | Oct | Nov | Dec | Year |
|---|---|---|---|---|---|---|---|---|---|---|---|---|---|
| Record high °C (°F) | 26.2 (79.2) | 31.3 (88.3) | 35.9 (96.6) | 35.0 (95.0) | 35.6 (96.1) | 37.4 (99.3) | 38.7 (101.7) | 39.6 (103.3) | 38.2 (100.8) | 34.9 (94.8) | 30.8 (87.4) | 25.7 (78.3) | 39.6 (103.3) |
| Mean daily maximum °C (°F) | 9.5 (49.1) | 12.4 (54.3) | 16.5 (61.7) | 23.0 (73.4) | 26.9 (80.4) | 29.7 (85.5) | 32.5 (90.5) | 32.5 (90.5) | 29.1 (84.4) | 23.3 (73.9) | 18.3 (64.9) | 12.6 (54.7) | 22.2 (71.9) |
| Daily mean °C (°F) | 5.7 (42.3) | 8.0 (46.4) | 11.6 (52.9) | 17.4 (63.3) | 21.4 (70.5) | 24.7 (76.5) | 26.8 (80.2) | 26.2 (79.2) | 22.9 (73.2) | 17.9 (64.2) | 12.8 (55.0) | 7.8 (46.0) | 16.9 (62.5) |
| Mean daily minimum °C (°F) | 3.4 (38.1) | 5.4 (41.7) | 8.7 (47.7) | 13.9 (57.0) | 17.8 (64.0) | 21.5 (70.7) | 23.1 (73.6) | 22.6 (72.7) | 19.3 (66.7) | 14.8 (58.6) | 9.8 (49.6) | 5.0 (41.0) | 13.8 (56.8) |
| Record low °C (°F) | −4.4 (24.1) | −4.7 (23.5) | −2.5 (27.5) | 4.3 (39.7) | 7.3 (45.1) | 12.6 (54.7) | 16.3 (61.3) | 16.2 (61.2) | 11.9 (53.4) | 3.7 (38.7) | −1.0 (30.2) | −4.5 (23.9) | −4.7 (23.5) |
| Average precipitation mm (inches) | 55.0 (2.17) | 63.0 (2.48) | 93.2 (3.67) | 128.4 (5.06) | 196.6 (7.74) | 221.7 (8.73) | 171.3 (6.74) | 122.5 (4.82) | 86.2 (3.39) | 86.6 (3.41) | 62.9 (2.48) | 42.7 (1.68) | 1,330.1 (52.37) |
| Average precipitation days (≥ 0.1 mm) | 15.1 | 14.8 | 18.7 | 17.7 | 17.6 | 16.4 | 12.9 | 12.3 | 9.6 | 12.5 | 10.8 | 11.2 | 169.6 |
| Average snowy days | 3.9 | 2.1 | 0.4 | 0 | 0 | 0 | 0 | 0 | 0 | 0 | 0.1 | 1.1 | 7.6 |
| Average relative humidity (%) | 83 | 83 | 84 | 83 | 84 | 85 | 82 | 82 | 82 | 84 | 83 | 82 | 83 |
| Mean monthly sunshine hours | 37.9 | 45.2 | 57.4 | 84.6 | 102.8 | 97.8 | 166.1 | 174.7 | 134.4 | 91.9 | 82.1 | 65.1 | 1,140 |
| Percentage possible sunshine | 12 | 14 | 15 | 22 | 25 | 24 | 40 | 43 | 37 | 26 | 25 | 20 | 25 |
Source: China Meteorological Administration
