= Anshun bus crash =

2020 bus crash in Anshun, Guizhou, China

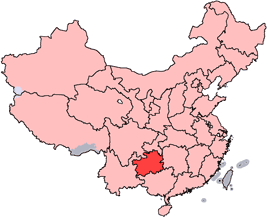
- Anshun is in the Guizhou province of China

Details
- Date: 7 July 2020; 12:17 p.m. China Standard Time (UTC+8)
- Location: Hongshan Reservoir Road, Xixiu District, Anshun, Guizhou, China
- Coordinates: 26°15′17″N 105°55′57″E
- Country: China
- Line: No. 2 Anshun Public Bus
- Cause: Intentional

Statistics
- Passengers: 36
- Crew: 1
- Deaths: 21
- Injured: 16

On 7 July 2020, a local bus in Anshun, Guizhou, China, made a sharp turn and crashed into the Hongshan Reservoir in Xixiu District. At least 21 people died and 16 others were injured. Among the passengers on the bus were candidates for the Gaokao examination.

== Crash ==
Video footage of the accident shows the bus moving slowly on the road before making a sudden sharp left turn at approximately 12:17 p.m. The bus crossed six lanes of traffic, crashed through the road guardrail, and fell down the embankment into the Hongshan Reservoir.

A survivor recalled the accident in a news interview: "When the bus just fell down to the river, the glass shattered, water poured in immediately. I swam out at the moment of impact."

== Rescue operations ==
At 1:30 p.m., Guizhou Fire and Rescue Corps mobilized 19 fire engines, 21 rubber boats and 97 rescue personnel (including 17 divers) to the scene for rescue. Entrusted by Party Secretary Sun Zhigang, Governor Shen Yiqin rushed to the accident site to organize rescue work. Minister of Public Security Zhao Kezhi appointed Du Hangwei, Vice Minister of Public Security, to lead a working group to Anshun to guide the investigation of the causes of the incident.

As of 11:00 p.m., all 37 people on board have been recovered, including 16 injured, 20 without vital signs, and one confirmed dead. Among the 37 passengers, 12 were students, five of whom had no vital signs, six were under treatment and one had been discharged from hospital. It was reported that the driver was among the dead.

== Investigation ==
The Guizhou Provincial Public Security Department set up a special group to investigate the cause of the accident. The driver, surnamed Zhang, was a 52-year-old man from Xixiu District of Anshun city. He held an A1 driver's license and had been driving the No. 2 bus since 1997.

On 12 July, investigators announced that the crash was caused intentionally by the driver who was unhappy that his rented home was demolished. In a statement, police announced that in 2016 the public house he was renting from his company was included in a shantytown renovation program that compensated him for 72,542.94 yuan which he refused to take. Early in the morning of 7 July, he returned to his home and found it about to be demolished, and called another bus driver and said he wanted to change shifts about two hours early. Police also alleged that he had purchased and drunk alcohol prior to and while driving the bus route before intentionally driving into the reservoir.

== See also ==
- 2022 Guizhou bus crash
