= Tonggudang =

Valley in Guizhou Province, China

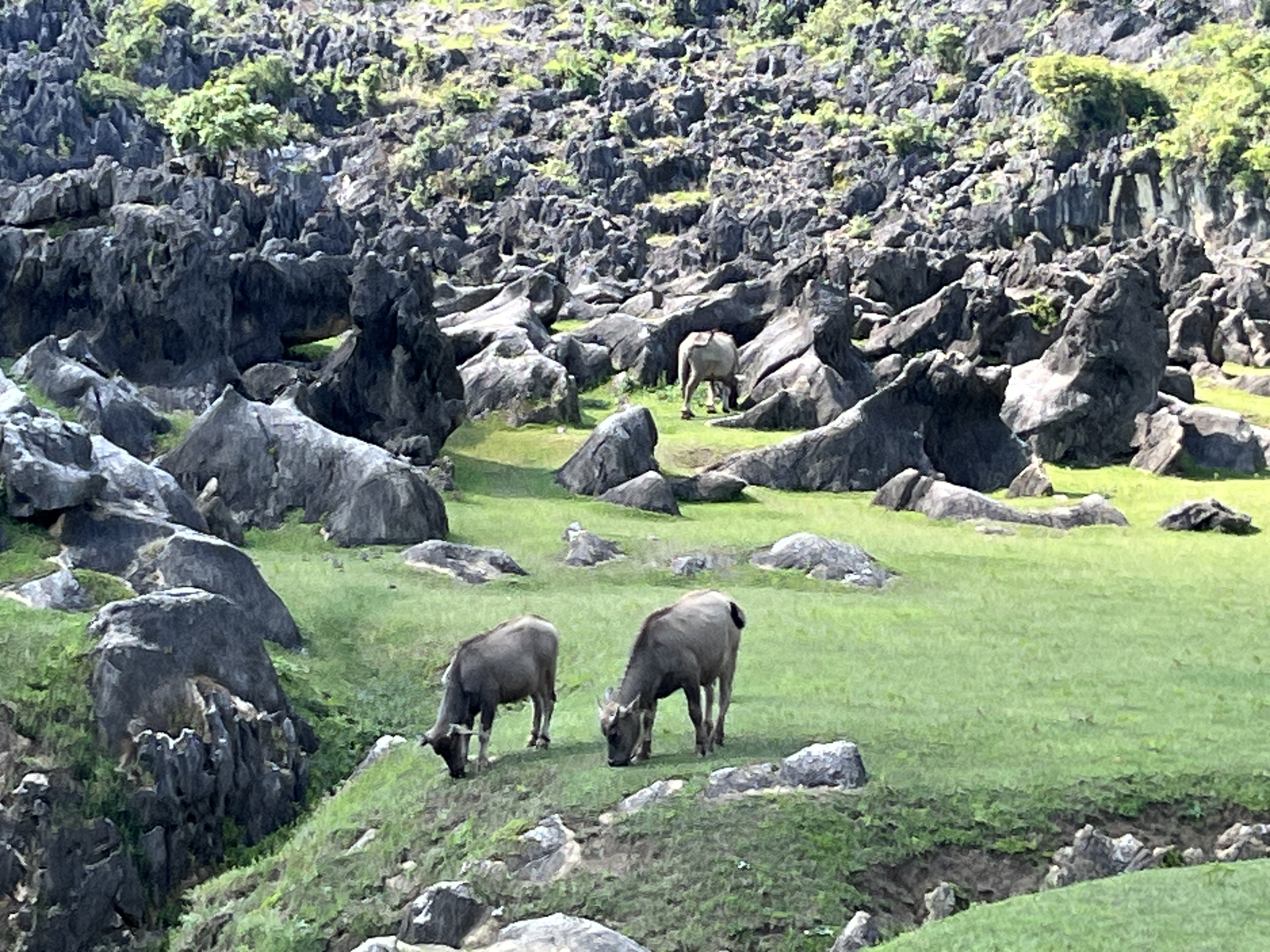
Tonggudang, Anshun, Guizhou

Tonggudang (Chinese: 铜鼓荡) is a valley located in Longga Village, Longgong Town, Anshun, Guizhou Province, China. This area is known for its unique landscape composed of black stone forests, meadows, and cattle and sheep pastures.

The name "Tonggudang" originates from a local geological phenomenon. After heavy rains, the volume of water in the underground river system beneath the area increases dramatically. The flowing water surges and collides within the rock crevices and cavities, producing a sound resembling the beating of a bronze drum that echoes through the valley. Therefore, the locals named it "Tonggudang".

== Transportation ==
Tonggudang is located in Longga Village, Longgong Town, approximately a 40-minute drive from the center of Anshun City. Visitors can follow navigation directions to Longga Village, then take an internal road passing a waterworks to reach the back mountain. Parking is available near the entrance to the scenic area.
