= Huangtong Subdistrict =

Huangtong Subdistrict 黄桶街道
- Subdistrict
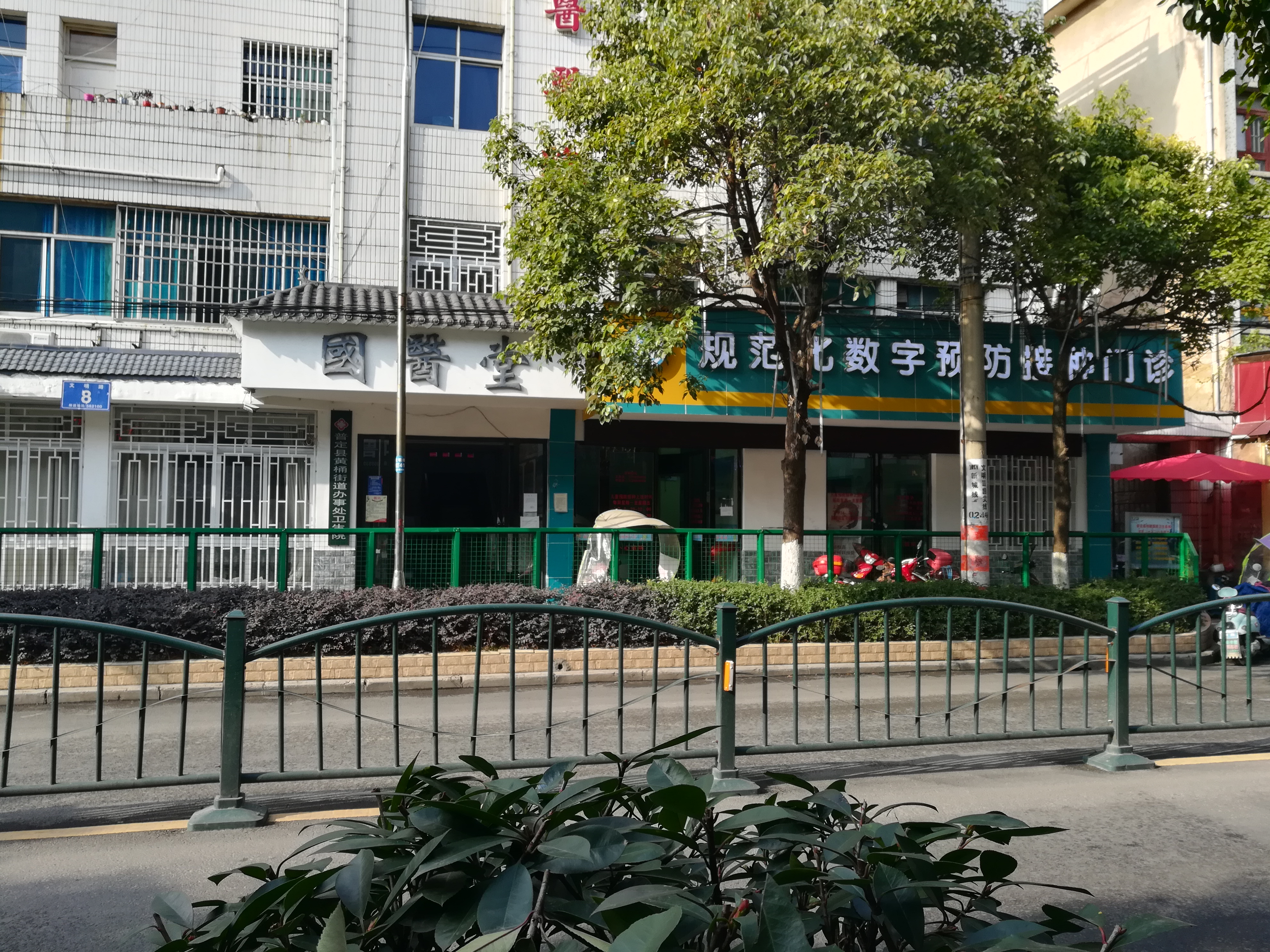
- Health Center of Huangtong Subdistrict in downtown Puding County, Guizhou, China.

- Location in Guizhou.
- Coordinates: 26°14′11″N 105°42′45″E
- Country: China
- Province: Guizhou
- Prefecture-level city: Anshun
- County: Puding County
- Time zone: UTC+08:00 (China Standard)
- Postal code: 562100
- Area code: 0851

Huangtong Subdistrict (simplified Chinese: 黄桶街道; traditional Chinese: 黃桶街道; pinyin: Huángtǒng Jiēdào) is an urban subdistrict in Puding County, Guizhou, China.

== History ==
According to the result on adjustment of township-level administrative divisions of Puding County on January 29, 2016, Chengguan Town (Chinese: 城关镇) was revoked and Huangtong Subdistrict was established.

== Administrative division ==
As of 2018, the subdistrict administers 8 villages and 4 residential communities: Houzhai Village (后寨村), Doupeng Village (斗蓬村), Xinbu Village (新堡村), Chenqi Village (陈旗村), Heliu Village (河柳村), Tianba Village (田坝村), Zhenyuan Village (镇远村), Daxing Village (大兴村), Qingshan Community (青山社区), Guanfeng Community (官冯社区), Taipingbu Community (太平堡社区), and Taiping Community (太平社区).

== Geography ==
Mountains located adjacent to and visible from the townsite are: Mount Guanyin (观音山), Mount Tuan (团山), Mount Jian (尖山), Mount Miaozhai (苗寨山).

Qingshan Reservoir (Chinese: 青山水库) is the largest body of water in the subdistrict.

== Transportation ==
Huangtong railway station and Puding railway station serve the subdistrict.

The Anshun-Liupanshui railway (Chinese: 安六铁路) is under construction.

The County Road X434 passes across the subdistrict north to south.

== See also ==
- List of township-level divisions of Guizhou
