= Machang, Puding County =

Machang Town 马场镇
- Town
- Location in Guizhou.
- Coordinates: 26°19′22″N 105°33′03″E
- Country: China
- Province: Guizhou
- Prefecture-level city: Anshun
- County: Puding County

Area
  - Total: 92.32 km^{2} (35.64 sq mi)

Population (2010)
  - Total: 43,000
  - Density: 470/km^{2} (1,200/sq mi)
- Time zone: UTC+08:00 (China Standard)
- Postal code: 562105
- Area code: 0851

Machang Town (simplified Chinese: 马场镇; traditional Chinese: 馬場鎮; pinyin: Mǎchǎng Zhèn) is a rural town in Puding County, Guizhou, China. It borders Jichangpo Town and Zhijin County in the north, Longchang Township in the east, Huachu Town in the south, and Longchang Township and Xinhua Township in the west. As of the 2010 census it had a population of 43,000 and an area of 92.32-square-kilometre (35.64 sq mi).

== History ==
From 630 (Tang dynasty) to 1351 (Yuan dynasty), Machang was the county seat of Puding County.

== Administrative division ==
As of January 2016, the town is divided into 39 villages and 1 community: Machang Community (Chinese: 马场社区), Machang Village (Chinese: 马场村), Walong Village (Chinese: 挖龙村), Yunpan Village (Chinese: 云盘村), Zhuchang Village (Chinese: 猪场村), Xiaguan Village (Chinese: 下官村), Tuniu Village (Chinese: 土牛村), Sancha Village (Chinese: 三岔村), Shangguan Village (Chinese: 上官村), Longtan Village (Chinese: 龙潭村), Maolipo Village (Chinese: 毛栗坡村), Xiaping Village (Chinese: 下坪村), Baiyang Village (Chinese: 白秧村), Dahongyan Village (Chinese: 大红岩村), Xinchai Village (Chinese: 新柴村), Songlin Village (Chinese: 松林村), Nahai Village (Chinese: 那亥村), Yanjiao Village (Chinese: 岩脚村), Naxi Village (Chinese: 那细村), Dujia Village (Chinese: 杜家村), Yanshang Village (Chinese: 岩上村), Luolong Village (Chinese: 落龙村), Dianzi Village (Chinese: 店子村), Dafenpo Village (Chinese: 大坟坡村), Yakou Village (Chinese: 垭口村), Xiaoxinzhai Village (Chinese: 小新寨村), Maluguan Village (Chinese: 马路关村), Meiziguan Village (Chinese: 梅子关村), Tengjia Village (Chinese: 腾家村), Sanhe Village (Chinese: 三合村), Banxiang Village (Chinese: 半厢村), Tianba Village (Chinese: 田坝村), Lanba Village (Chinese: 滥坝村), Bona Village (Chinese: 波那村), Danggu Village (Chinese: 党固村), Dafenba Village (Chinese: 大坟坝村), Banpo Village (Chinese: 半坡村), Lijia Village (Chinese: 李家村), Xiapai Village (Chinese: 下排村), Wanzhai Village (Chinese: 湾寨村), and Huangdian Village (Chinese: 黄店村).

== Geography ==
The Sancha River () passes through the town east to west.

== Economy ==
Myrica rubra, chestnut, pepper, grape, tea and ginkgo are the main cash crops in the region.

== Transportation ==
The County Road 436 passes across the town east to west.

== Attractions ==
Former Residence of Yuan Yuying (Chinese: 袁愈嫈故居) is a famous scenic spot.

Dugong Pavilion (Chinese: 渡功亭) is a cultural relics protection unit at county level.

== See also ==
- List of township-level divisions of Guizhou
