= Chuandong Subdistrict =

Chuandong Subdistrict 穿洞街道
- Subdistrict
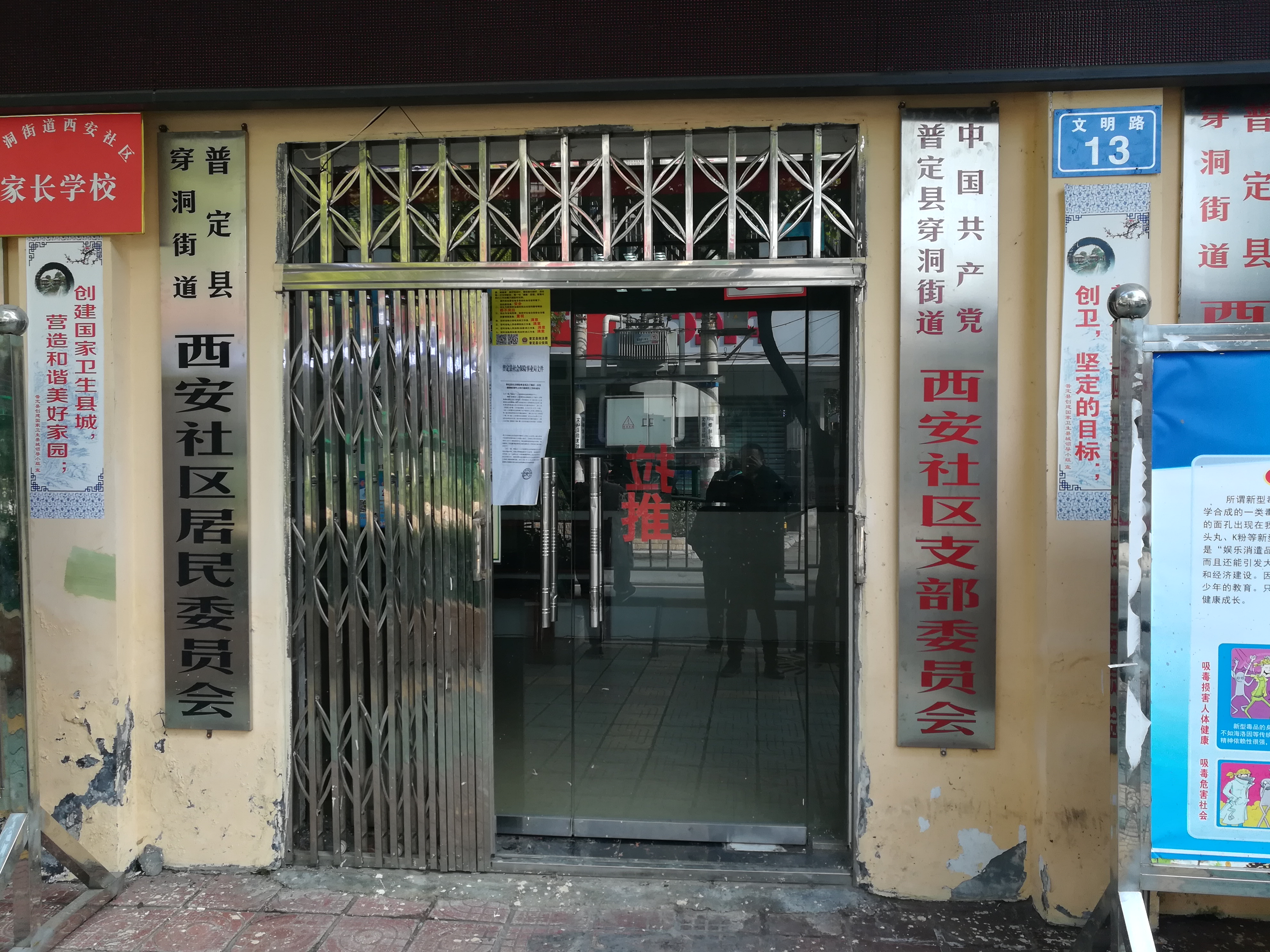
- Residents' Committee of Xi'an Community, Chuandong Subdistrict.

- Location in Guizhou.
- Coordinates: 26°19′43″N 105°38′31″E
- Country: China
- Province: Guizhou
- Prefecture-level city: Anshun
- County: Puding County
- Time zone: UTC+08:00 (China Standard)
- Postal code: 562100
- Area code: 0851

Chuandong Subdistrict (Chinese: 穿洞街道; pinyin: Chuāndòng Jiēdào) is an urban subdistrict in Puding County, Guizhou, China.

== History ==
According to the result on adjustment of township-level administrative divisions of Puding County on January 29, 2016, Chengguan Town (Chinese: 城关镇) and Longchang Township (Chinese: 龙场乡) were revoked. Chuandong Subdistrict was established.

== Administrative division ==
As of January 2016, the subdistrict is divided into 18 villages and 3 communities: Xi'an Community (西安社区), Chuandong Community (穿洞社区), Wenming Community (文明社区), Sanhe Village (三合村), Jinma New Village (金马新村), Longma Village (龙马新村), Renmin Village (人民村), Hongxin Village (红新村), Changtian Village (长田村), Yanshang Village (岩上村), Boyu Village (波玉村), Xinhe Village (新和村), Xiushui Village (秀水村), Lianhe Village (联合村), Mingxing Village (茗兴村), Jinghu Village (景湖村), Dashu Village (大树村), Gongda Village (贡达村), Longxin Village (龙新村), Xiaoyao Village (小窑村), and Dianshan Village (靛山村).

== Hospital ==
The Puding County People's Hospital is located in the subdistrict.

== Transportation ==
The County Road X436 passes across the subdistrict.

== See also ==
- List of township-level divisions of Guizhou
