= Hongshan Reservoir =

- 虹山水库 (Chinese)
- Location within China
- Location: Anshun, China
- Coordinates: 26°15′17″N 105°56′01″E
- Type: Artificial lake
- Max. length: 2.0 km (1.2 mi)
- Max. width: 0.5 km (0.31 mi)
- Surface area: 54 ha (130 acres)

Hongshan Reservoir (simplified Chinese: 虹山水库; traditional Chinese: 虹山水庫; pinyin: Hóngshān Shuǐkù) is a small artificial lake in Anshun City, Guizhou province, China, used for water retention on a branch of the Dabang River. Its dam was built in 1958, and it reached capacity in 1959. It was given a makeover in 2017 and is now surrounded with park landscaping where possible, and has amenities such as art installations, boardwalks, recreational paths, pedestrian bridges and picnic areas. In 2020 it was the site of the Anshun bus crash, when a bus veered off the dam road, down the viewing steps, and into the water.
