= Yaopu, Guizhou =

Yaopu 幺铺镇
- Town
- Location within China
- Coordinates: 26°10′12″N 105°50′56″E
- Country: People's Republic of China
- Province: Guizhou
- Prefecture-level city: Anshun
- District: Xixiu District
- Time zone: UTC+8 (China Standard)
- Area code: 0851

Yaopu (simplified Chinese: 幺铺; traditional Chinese: 么鋪; pinyin: Yāopù) is a town under the administration of Xixiu District, Anshun City in central Guizhou, People's Republic of China. As of 2018, it has 7 residential communities (社区) and 29 villages under its administration.

== See also ==
- List of township-level divisions of Guizhou
