= Puding County =

Puding County 普定县
- County
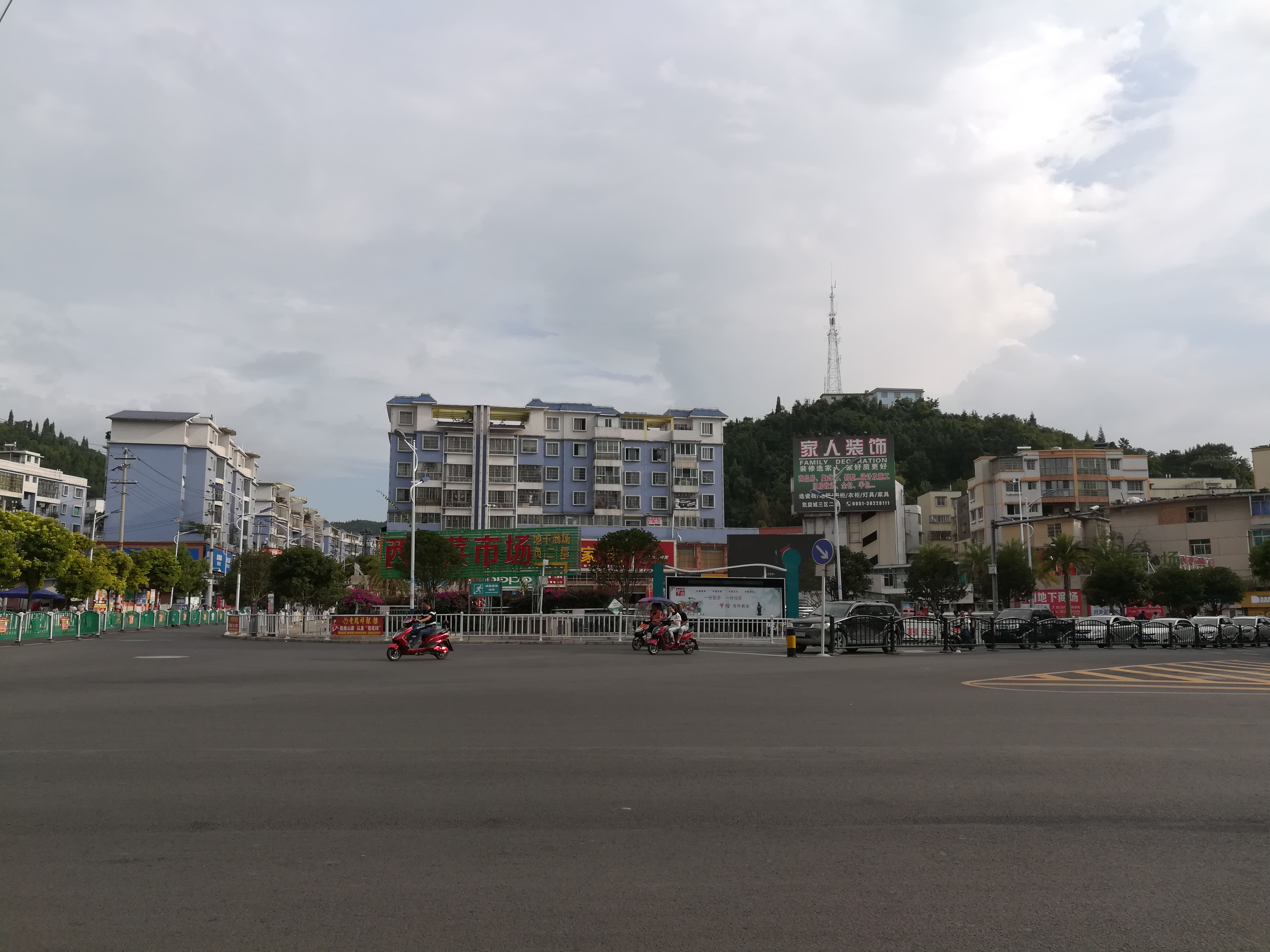

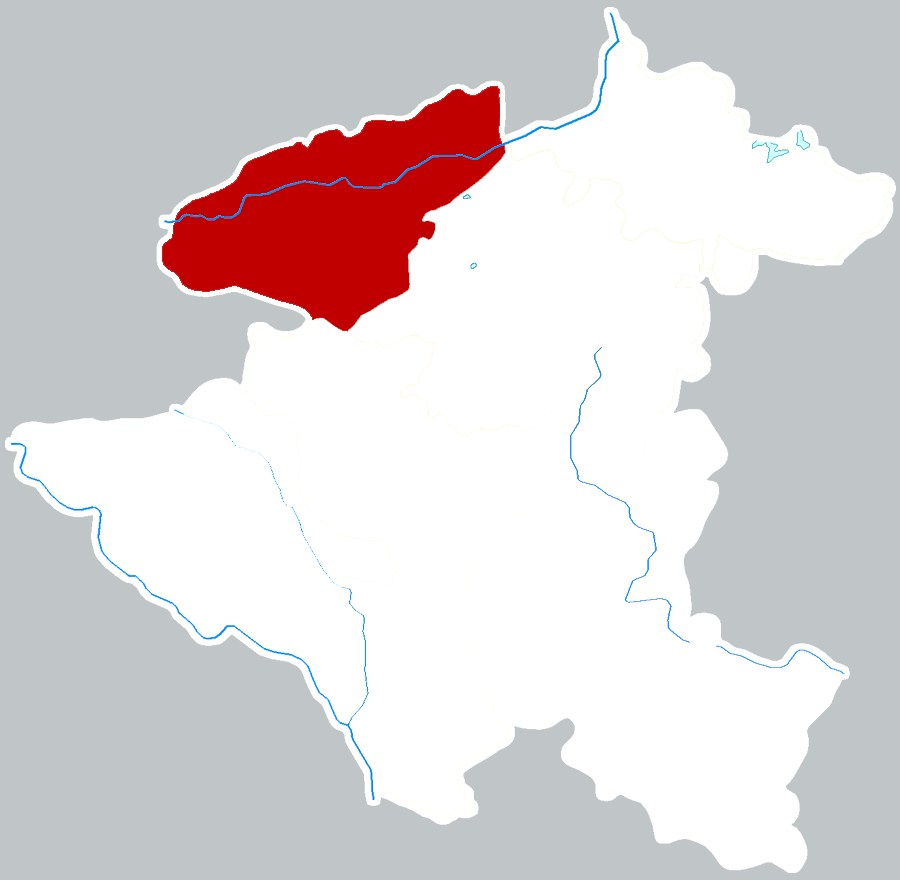

- Location of the seat in Guizhou Puding (Southwest China)
- Coordinates (Puding County government): 26°18′07″N 105°44′36″E
- Country: China
- Province: Guizhou
- Prefecture-level city: Anshun
- County seat: Dingnan Subdistrict

Area
  - Total: 1,090.49 km^{2} (421.04 sq mi)

Population (2010)
  - Total: 378,288
  - Density: 346.897/km^{2} (898.460/sq mi)
- Time zone: UTC+8 (China Standard)

Puding County (simplified Chinese: 普定县; traditional Chinese: 普定縣; pinyin: Pǔdìng Xiàn) is a county in west-central Guizhou province, China. It is under the administration of the prefecture-level city of Anshun.

== Etymology ==
The name "Puding" (普定; Pǔdìng) can be traced back to the Mongolian-rule Yuan dynasty (1271–1368), when in 1257, after the Mongolian army went to conquest southwest China, the imperial court set up a "Fu" named "Puding" in the area.

== History ==
In the 3rd century BC, Puding County (Puding) was a part of an ancient political entity Yelang.

After the Tang Empire conquered Guizhou, a county named "Shi'an" (始安县) was set up and it came under the jurisdiction of Yan Zhou (琰州), which symboled this land was formally annexed to the Tang Empire. In 755, the An Lushan Rebellion broke out, then the past decades of internal fighting had weakened the Tang Empire. Puding broke away from the rule of the Tang Empire. The native tribes founded the Luodian Kingdom (罗甸国).

In the Five Dynasties and Ten Kingdoms period (907–960), it belonged to Shi'an County, part of which was owned by Wangjiang county (望江县).

In 1257, the Mongols occupied Puding and established Puding Prefecture (普定府) and it came under the administration of Qujing Xuanweisi (曲靖宣慰司). In 1351, Puding County was separated from Puding Prefecture.

In 1381, in the ruling of Hongwu Emperor (1368–1398) of the Ming dynasty (1368–1644), Puding Castle was founded and it came under the jurisdiction of Sichuan Dusi (四川都司). In 1438, in the 3rd year of Zhengtong era (1436–1449), Puding County was under the administration of Guizhou Dusi (贵州都司).

During the reign of Kangxi Emperor of the Qing dynasty (1644–1911), Puding County belonged to Anshun Prefecture (安顺府).

After the establishment of the Republic of China in 1912, Puding County was briefly revoked but immediately restored in the following year. In 1914, some areas of Anshun, Zhenning, Langdai, Zhijin and Pingba were merged into Puding County. In 1935, Puding County came under the jurisdiction of the (Anshun) Second Administrative Supervision Region (（安顺）第二行政督察区). Three years later, it came under the jurisdiction of the (Xingren) Third Administrative Supervision Region (（兴仁）第三行政督察区).

In 1949, Guizhou was liberated by the People's Liberation Army. Puding County came under the jurisdiction of Anshun Zhuanqu (now Anshun; 安顺专区; Anshun Special Administrative Region).

== Administrative divisions ==
After an adjustment of township-level administrative divisions of Puding County on January 29, 2016, the county has three subdistricts, six towns and three ethnic townships under its jurisdiction. In July 2019, Yuxiu Subdistrict was separated from Chuandong Subdistrict.

subdistricts

- Dingnan Subdistrict (定南街道)
- Chuandong Subdistrict (穿洞街道)
- Huangtong Subdistrict (黄桶街道)
- Yuxiu Subdistrict (玉秀街道)
- Maguan (马官镇)
- Huachu (化处镇)
- Machang (马场镇)
- Baiyan (白岩镇)
- Pingshang (坪上镇)
- Jichangpo (鸡场坡镇)

ethnic townships

- Bulang Miao Ethnic Township (补郎苗族乡)
- Houchang Miao and Gelao Ethnic Township (猴场苗族仡佬族乡)
- Maodong Miao and Gelao Ethnic Township (猫洞苗族仡佬族乡)

== Geography ==
Puding County is located in west-central Guizhou province. The county has a total area of 1,079.93 km^{2} (416.96 sq mi). It shares a border with Liuzhi Special District to the west, Xixiu District, Pingba District and Anshun Economic and Technological Development Zone to the east, Zhijin County to the north, and Zhenning Buyei and Miao Autonomous County and Liuzhi Special District to the south.

=== Geology ===
The terrain of Puding County is high in the south and north and low in the middle. Karst landforms are widely distributed in Puding County.

=== Climate ===
Puding County experience a subtropical monsoon humid climate, with an average annual temperature of 15.1 °C (59.2 °F), total annual rainfall of 1,378.2-millimetre (54.26 in), a frost-free period of 301 days and annual average sunshine hours in 1164.9 hours. The climate is mild throughout the year, without severe cold in winter and hot in summer.

Climate data for Puding, elevation 1,282 m (4,206 ft), (1991–2020 normals, extremes 1981–present)
Month	Jan	Feb	Mar	Apr	May	Jun	Jul	Aug	Sep	Oct	Nov	Dec	Year
Record high °C (°F)	23.5 (74.3)	30.1 (86.2)	33.0 (91.4)	34.3 (93.7)	34.7 (94.5)	33.0 (91.4)	32.5 (90.5)	34.0 (93.2)	32.7 (90.9)	29.4 (84.9)	27.3 (81.1)	22.9 (73.2)	34.7 (94.5)
Mean daily maximum °C (°F)	8.6 (47.5)	12.0 (53.6)	16.7 (62.1)	21.9 (71.4)	24.4 (75.9)	25.7 (78.3)	27.2 (81.0)	27.4 (81.3)	24.8 (76.6)	19.7 (67.5)	16.2 (61.2)	10.6 (51.1)	19.6 (67.3)
Daily mean °C (°F)	5.5 (41.9)	8.0 (46.4)	11.9 (53.4)	16.8 (62.2)	19.7 (67.5)	21.7 (71.1)	23.0 (73.4)	22.7 (72.9)	20.3 (68.5)	16.1 (61.0)	12.3 (54.1)	7.3 (45.1)	15.4 (59.8)
Mean daily minimum °C (°F)	3.4 (38.1)	5.3 (41.5)	8.8 (47.8)	13.2 (55.8)	16.2 (61.2)	18.8 (65.8)	20.1 (68.2)	19.5 (67.1)	17.3 (63.1)	13.7 (56.7)	9.6 (49.3)	5.0 (41.0)	12.6 (54.6)
Record low °C (°F)	−4.9 (23.2)	−3.5 (25.7)	−2.9 (26.8)	3.1 (37.6)	6.6 (43.9)	11.7 (53.1)	11.8 (53.2)	14.2 (57.6)	8.6 (47.5)	4.4 (39.9)	−1.3 (29.7)	−8.5 (16.7)	−8.5 (16.7)
Average precipitation mm (inches)	24.5 (0.96)	17.8 (0.70)	31.2 (1.23)	69.2 (2.72)	161.5 (6.36)	309.1 (12.17)	271.6 (10.69)	177.8 (7.00)	123.5 (4.86)	91.2 (3.59)	34.3 (1.35)	18.3 (0.72)	1,330 (52.35)
Average precipitation days (≥ 0.1 mm)	14.5	12.2	13.3	13.7	16.9	18.7	17.8	15.5	12.5	16.0	11.0	12.0	174.1
Average snowy days	3.3	1.6	0.2	0	0	0	0	0	0	0	0.1	1.0	6.2
Average relative humidity (%)	81	77	75	72	73	80	80	78	77	80	77	79	77
Mean monthly sunshine hours	41.2	64.6	95.4	129.6	133.2	103.8	150.4	166.4	123.4	75.1	85.7	54.8	1,223.6
Percentage possible sunshine	12	20	25	34	32	25	36	41	34	21	27	17	27
Source: China Meteorological Administration

=== Rivers ===
Sancha River (三岔河) is the largest river in Puding County and Boyu River (波玉河) is the second largest river in the county. Dabang River rises in southern Puding County.

=== Lakes and reservoirs ===
Yelang Lake (夜郎湖) is the largest lake in Puding County, with a capacity of 0.42 cubic kilometres (110×10^{9} US gal).

== Demographics ==
=== Population ===
As of 2017, Puding County had a population of 505,400. The total number of permanent residents in Puding County is 392,800, the birth rate is 12.95 ‰, the mortality rate is 5.14 ‰, and the natural population growth rate is 7.81 ‰. The Han is about 80% of the total population of Puding County, and Miao and Bouyei are the main ethnic minorities in the county.

=== Language ===
Mandarin is the official language. The local people speak both Southwestern Mandarin and minority language.

=== Religion ===
The county government supports all religions. The local people mainly believe in Buddhism and Catholicism.

== Education ==
The main high schools and middle schools are:

- Puding County No. 1 High School
- Puding County No. 2 High School
- Machang Middle School (马场中学)
- Maguan Middle School (马关中学)
- Longchang Middle School (龙场中学)
- Baiyan Middle School (白岩中学)
- Bulang Middle School (补郎中学)
- Houchang Middle School (猴场中学)
- Pingshang Middle School (坪上中学)
- Huachu Middle School (化处中学)
- Maodong Middle School (猫洞中学)
- Jichang Middle School (鸡场中学)

== Transport ==
=== Expressway ===
S55 Chiwang Expressway runs north to south through the downtown Puding County and then to heads west to Anshun city.

Provincial Highway S209 travels through central Puding County and intersects with S55 Anshunxi Ring Expressway in the town of Baiyan.

=== Railway ===
Puding railway station serves the county.

== Notable people ==
- Ren Kecheng, politician.
- Yuan Xiaocen, sculptor and painter of Chinese painting.
- Liu Gangji (刘纲纪), professor at Wuhan University.
- Yuan Yu'an, professor at Guizhou University.
- Yuan Xikun, sculptor and painter.
