= Machang =

Machang may refer to:

- Machang District, Kelantan, Malaysia
  - Machang (town)
  - Machang (federal constituency)
- Machang, Anhui, a town in Quanjiao County, China
- Machang, Puding County, a town in Guizhou, China
- Machang, Qing County, a town in Hebei, China
- Machang station, a subway station in Kaifu District, Changsha, Hunan, China
- Zongzi, or machang, a rice dish
