= Maguan, Guizhou =

Maguan Town 马官镇
- Town
- Location in Guizhou.
- Coordinates: 26°13′24″N 105°45′04″E
- Country: China
- Province: Guizhou
- Prefecture-level city: Anshun
- County: Puding County

Area
  - Total: 115.07 km^{2} (44.43 sq mi)

Population (2010)
  - Total: 44,596
  - Density: 387.56/km^{2} (1,003.8/sq mi)
- Time zone: UTC+08:00 (China Standard)
- Postal code: 562101
- Area code: 0851

Maguan Town (simplified Chinese: 马官镇; traditional Chinese: 馬官鎮; pinyin: Mǎguān Zhèn) is a rural Chinese town in Puding County, Guizhou, China. As of the 2010 census it had a population of 44,596 and an area of 115.07-square-kilometre (44.43 sq mi).

== Administrative divisions ==
As of 2020, the town is divided into three residential neighborhoods and seven villages:

Neighborhoods

- Maguan Community
- Mapu (马堡)
- Xinmapu Community (新马堡社区)

Villages

- Tianxing Village (天兴村)
- Jinhe Village (金荷村)
- Zhongshan Village (中山村)
- Yuguan Village (余官村)
- Shuangyu Village (双玉村)
- Puqiao Village (堡桥村)
- Tunyuan Village (屯院村)

== Economy ==
The local economy is primarily based upon agriculture and local industry.

== Transportation ==
The Guizhou-Kunming railway passes across the town east to west.

== Notable people ==
- Liu Gangji (1933–2019), philosopher and professor at Wuhan University

== See also ==
- List of township-level divisions of Guizhou
