= Dingnan Subdistrict =

Dingnan Subdistrict 定南街道
- Subdistrict
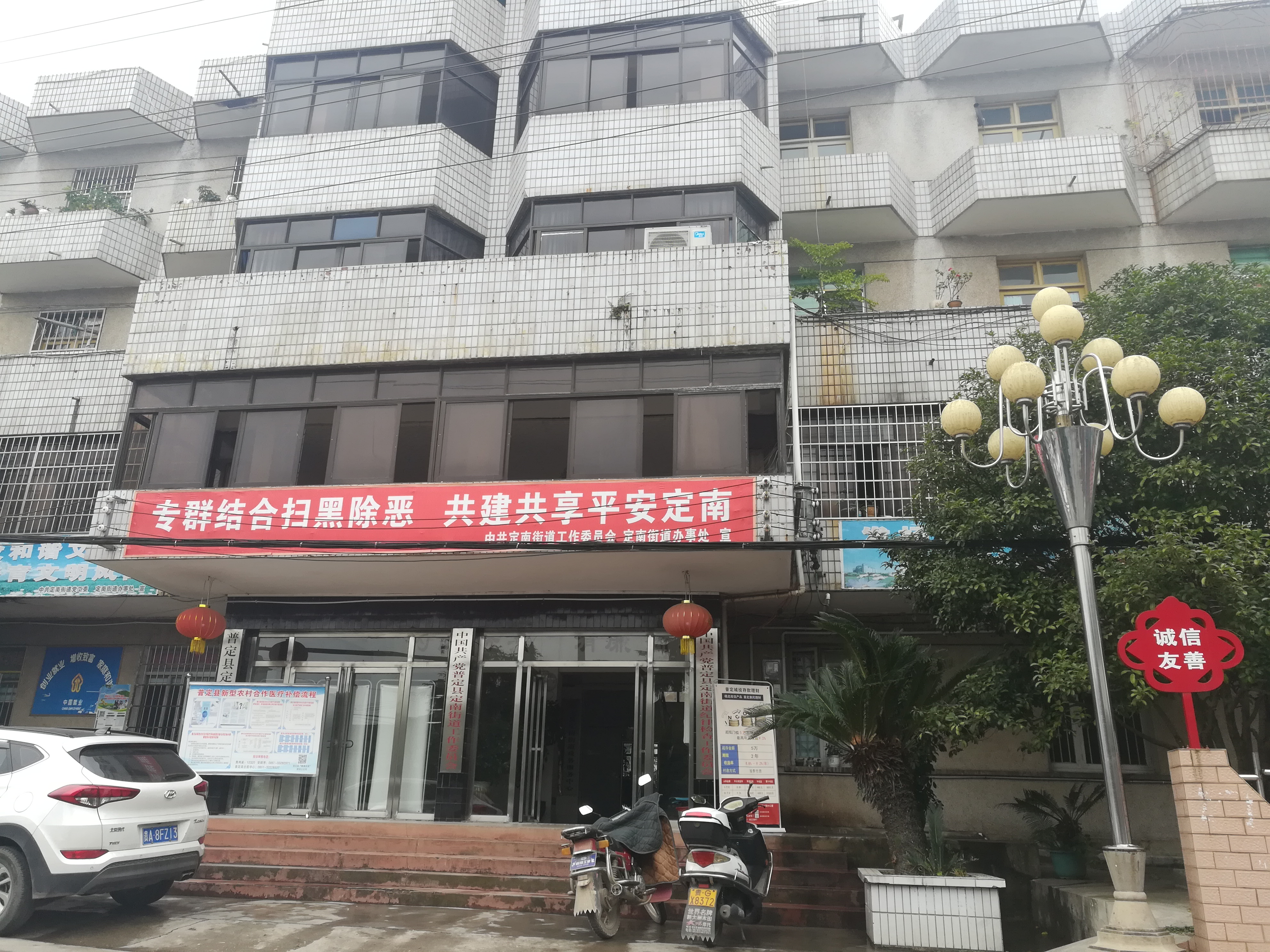
- Dingnan Subdistrict Office.

- Location in Guizhou.
- Coordinates: 26°18′39″N 105°44′39″E
- Country: China
- Province: Guizhou
- Prefecture-level city: Anshun
- County: Puding County

Area
  - Total: 146.09 km^{2} (56.41 sq mi)
- Time zone: UTC+08:00 (China Standard)
- Postal code: 562100
- Area code: 0851

Dingnan Subdistrict (Chinese: 定南街道; pinyin: Dìngnán Jiēdào) is an urban subdistrict in Puding County, Guizhou, China.

== History ==
According to the result on adjustment of township-level administrative divisions of Puding County on January 29, 2016, Chengguan Town (Chinese: 城关镇) was upgraded to a subdistrict named "Dingnan Subdistrict".

== Administrative division ==
As of January 2016, the subdistrict is divided into 12 villages and 3 communities: Tashan Community (塔山社区), Nanhua Community (南华社区), Donghua Community (东华社区), Xinhe Village (新合村), Xiangyang Village (向阳村), Tianwangqi New Village (天王旗新村), Renhe Village (仁和村), Renbao Village (陈堡村), Longhei Village (陇黑村), Longcai Village (陇财村), Zhuguan Village (朱官村), Dingnan Village (定南村), Chudong Village (褚东村), Jinhua Village (金华村), and Yelang New Village (夜郎新村).

== Geography ==
The Yelang Lake (Chinese: 夜郎湖) is located within the subdistrict. It is very popular for boating, fishing and camping and is home to many residents from other areas of the province during the summer months.

== Education ==
The town has two public schools: Puding County Experimental School and Puding County No. 1 High School.

== Transportation ==
The S55 Puding-Anshun Expressway (Chinese: S55普安高速公路) passes across the subdistrict north to southeast.

== See also ==
- List of township-level divisions of Guizhou
