= Huaxi Subdistrict, Anshun =

Huaxi Subdistrict 华西街道
- Subdistrict
- Location in China
- Coordinates: 26°14′41″N 105°55′26″E
- Country: People's Republic of China
- Province: Guizhou
- Prefecture-level city: Anshun
- District: Xixiu District
- Time zone: UTC+8 (China Standard)

Huaxi Subdistrict (simplified Chinese: 华西街道; traditional Chinese: 華西街道; pinyin: Huáxī Jiēdào) is a subdistrict in Xixiu District, Anshun, Guizhou, China. As of 2018, it has 12 residential communities and 9 villages under its administration.

== See also ==
- List of township-level divisions of Guizhou
