= Anshun Huangguoshu Airport =

Anshun Huangguoshu Airport 安顺黄果树机场
- IATA: AVA; ICAO: ZUAS

Summary
- Airport type: Public / Military
- Location: Anshun, Guizhou, China
- Coordinates: 26°15′38″N 105°52′23″E

Map
- Location of airport in Guizhou

Runways
Direction	Length		Surface
Direction	m	ft	Surface
08/26	2,800	9,186

Statistics (2021)
- Passengers: 69,293
- Aircraft movements: 967
- Cargo (metric tons): 2.3

Anshun Huangguoshu Airport
- Simplified Chinese: 安顺黄果树机场
- Traditional Chinese: 安順黃果樹機場
Transcriptions
Standard Mandarin
- Hanyu Pinyin: Ānshùn Huángguǒshù Jīchǎng

Anshun Huangguoshu Airport (IATA: AVA, ICAO: ZUAS) is a dual-use military and public airport serving the city of Anshun in Guizhou Province, China. It was built in 1965 as a military airport and opened to civil flights in 2002.

== Airlines and destinations ==
Airlines	Destinations
Beijing Capital Airlines	Sanya, Xi'an
China United Airlines	Beijing–Daxing

== See also ==
- List of airports in China
- List of the busiest airports in China
- List of People's Liberation Army Air Force airbases
