= Huangguoshu Waterfall =

Waterfall in Guizhou, China

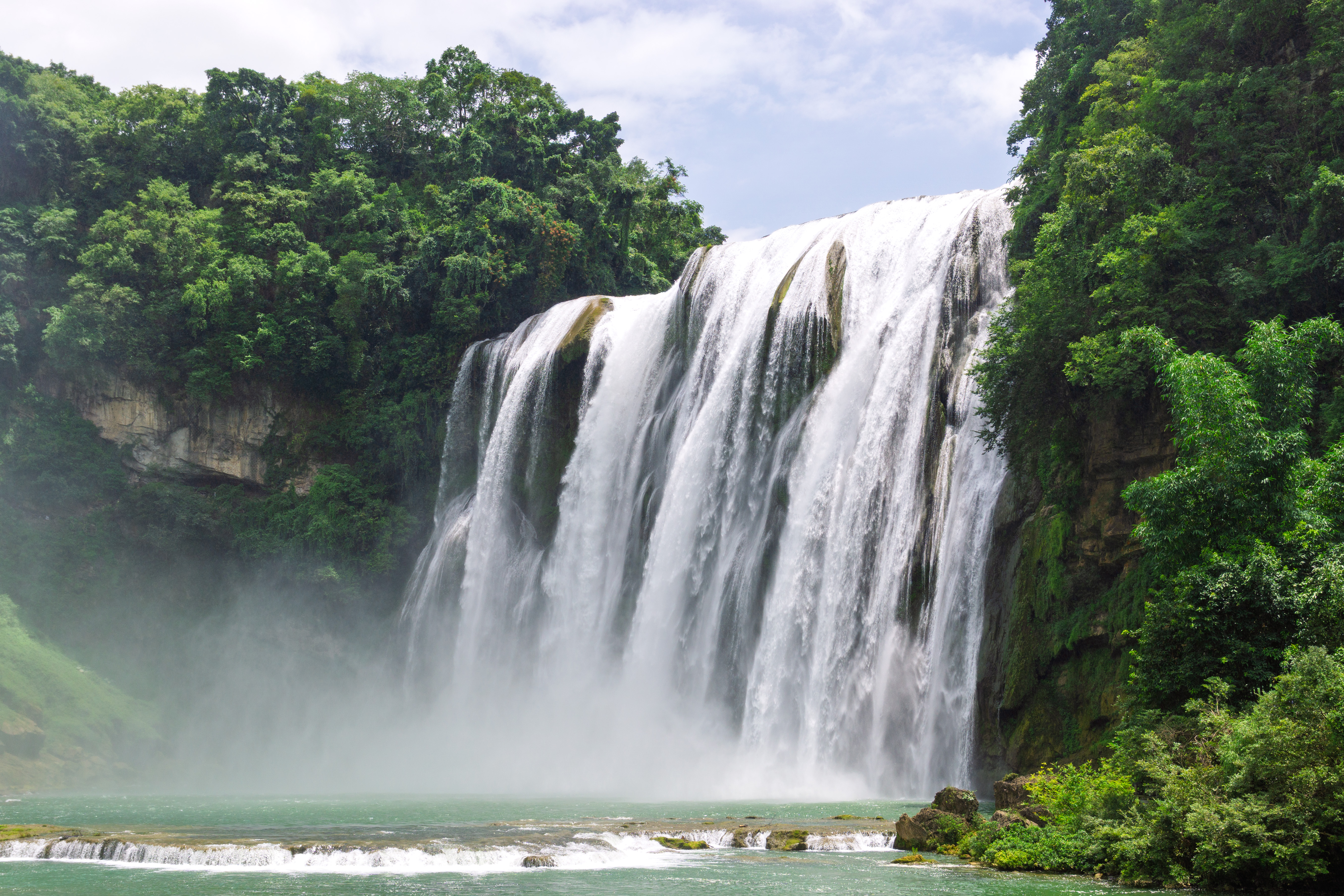
- Huangguoshu Waterfall
- Interactive map of Huangguoshu Waterfall
- Location: Anshun, Guizhou, China
- Coordinates: 25.992°N 105.666°E
- Type: Segmented Block
- Elevation: 903.9 m (2,966 ft)
- Total height: 77.8 m (255 ft)
- Total width: 101 m (331 ft)
- Watercourse: Pearl River
- Average flow rate: 18.2 L/s km^{2}

Huangguoshu Waterfall (simplified Chinese: 黄果树瀑布; traditional Chinese: 黃果樹瀑布; pinyin: Huáng Guǒshù Pùbù; Wade–Giles: Huang-kuo-shu p'u-pu; lit. 'Yellow-Fruit Tree Waterfalls') is the largest waterfall in China and one of the largest waterfalls in East Asia. It is located on the Liuzhi River in Anshun, Guizhou province. It is 77.8 m (255 ft) high and 101 m (331 ft) wide. The main waterfall, at 67 m (220 ft) high and 83.3 m (273 ft) wide, is the biggest waterfall in Asia.

== Tourism ==
Known as the Huangguoshu Waterfall National Park, it is 45 km (28 mi) southwest of Anshun City. Together with minor waterfalls, the charms of the waterfall is a natural tourist draw, classified as a AAAAA scenic area by the China National Tourism Administration.

Huangguoshu Waterfall may be seen from a number of vantage points. One viewing spot is Waterfall-Viewing Pavilion (Guan Bao ting), where the waterfall can be seen from a distance. Another is Water-Viewing Stage (Guan Bao Ting), where the waterfall can be seen from a bird's-eye view. The third is Waterfall-Viewing Stage (Guan Bao Tai) in which visitors raise their heads to see the scene.

There is a special line of buses servicing Huangguoshu Waterfall, the Dragon's Palace at Guiyang, and Anshun railway stations.

== History ==
In the book Xu Xiake's Travels, Xu Xiake (1587–1641) described the waterfalls as "the foams rise from the rocks like a mist".

== Gallery ==
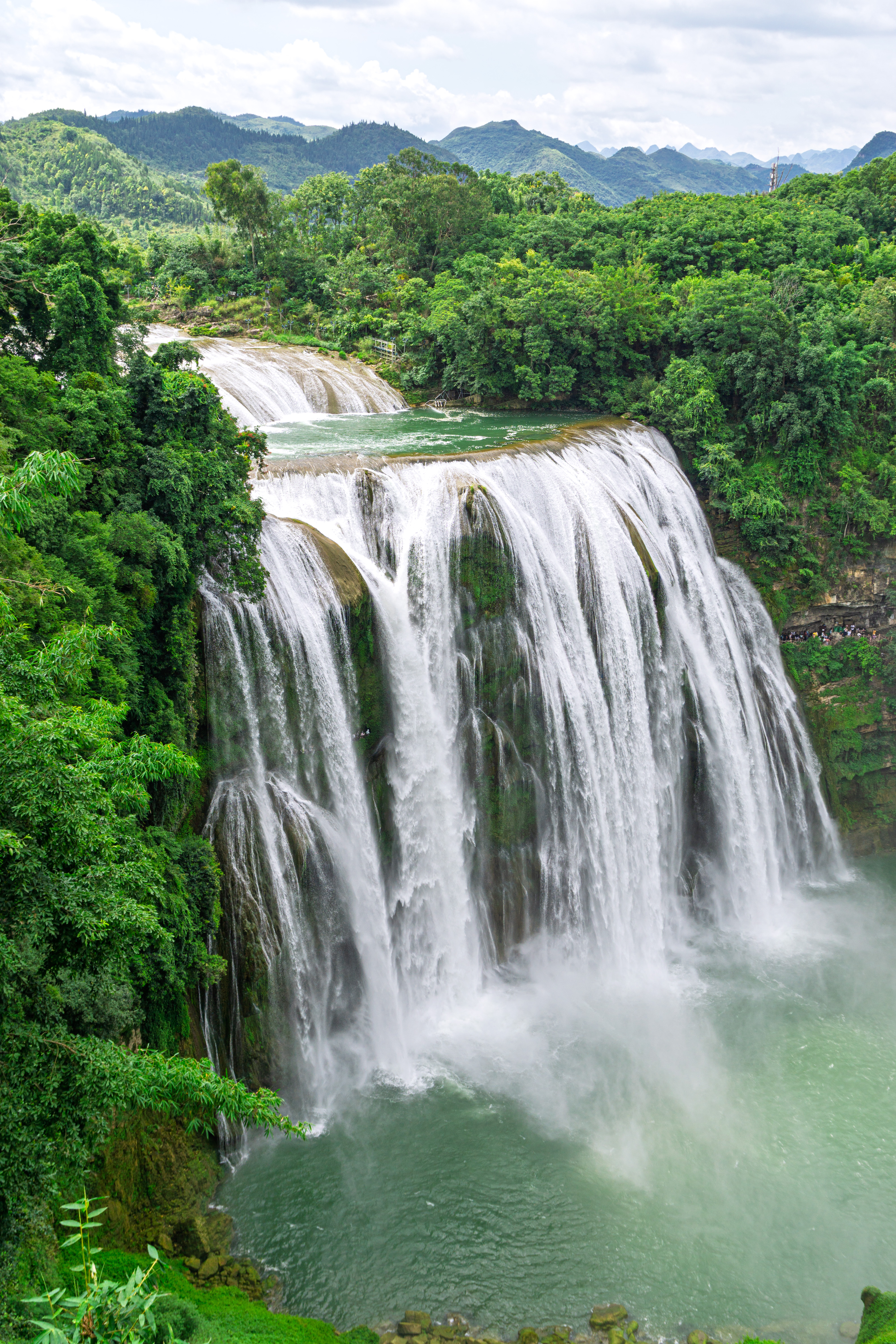
A view of Huangguoshu Waterfall from above.

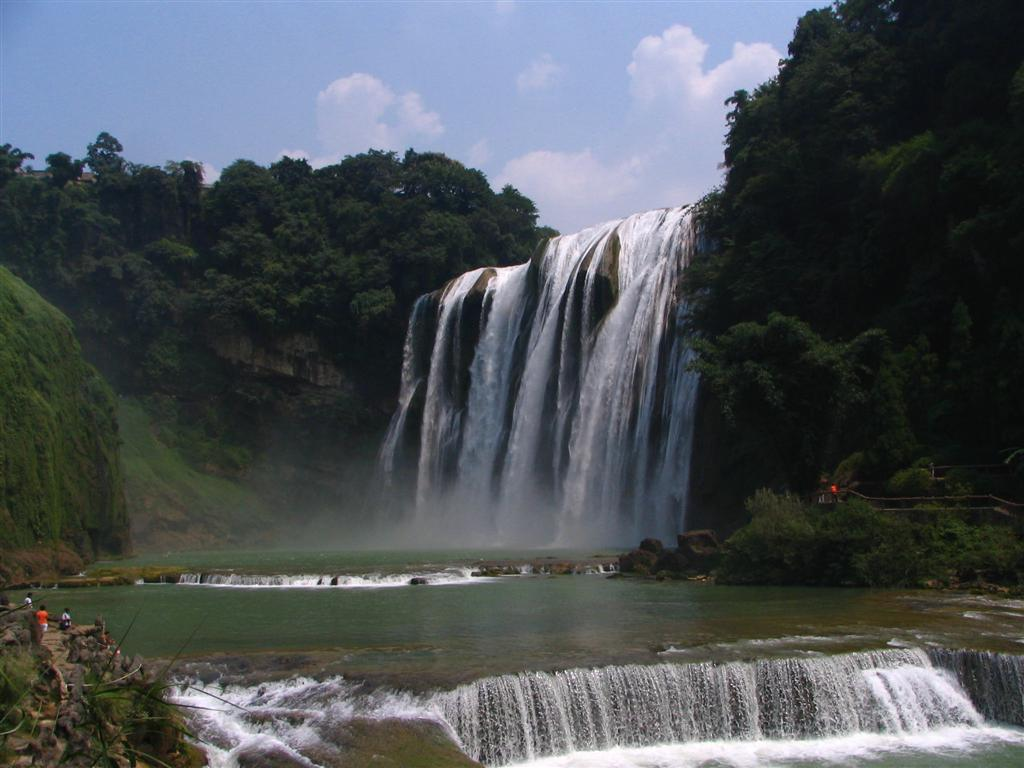
Huangguoshu Waterfall, the largest waterfall in China.

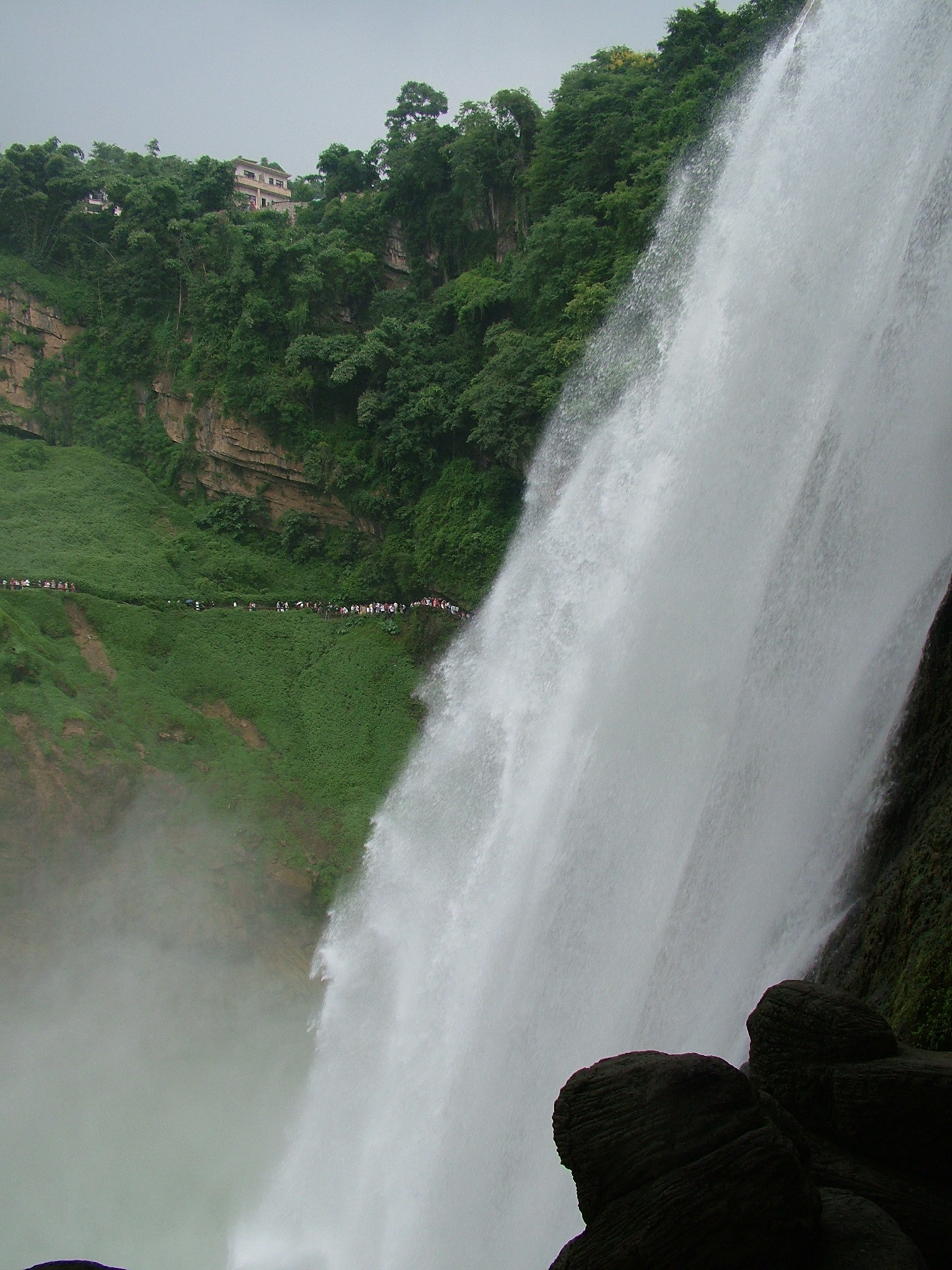
A view of the Huangguoshu Waterfall from the Water-Curtain Cave.

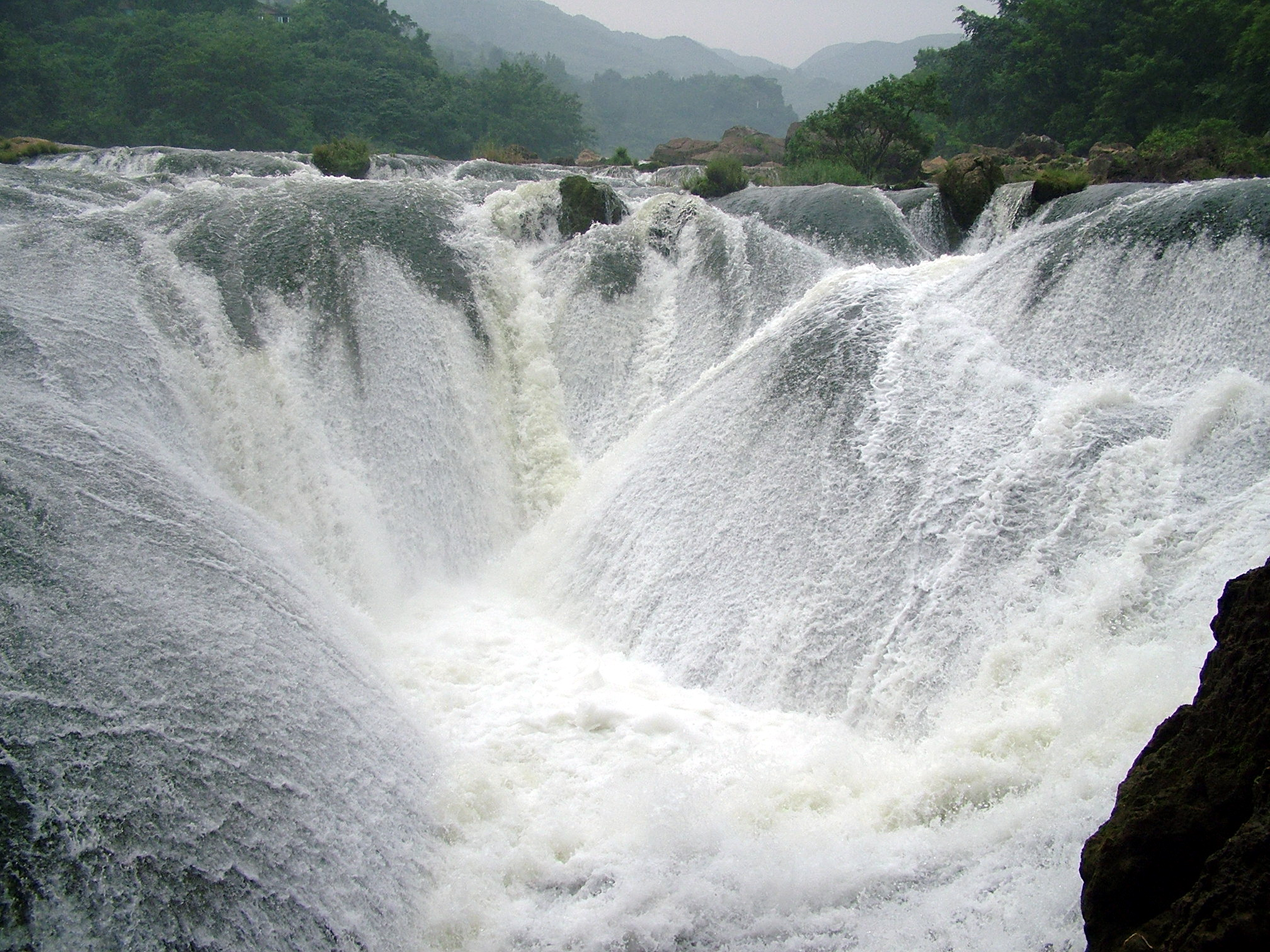
Nearby Yinlianzhuitan Waterfall (銀鏈墜潭瀑布).

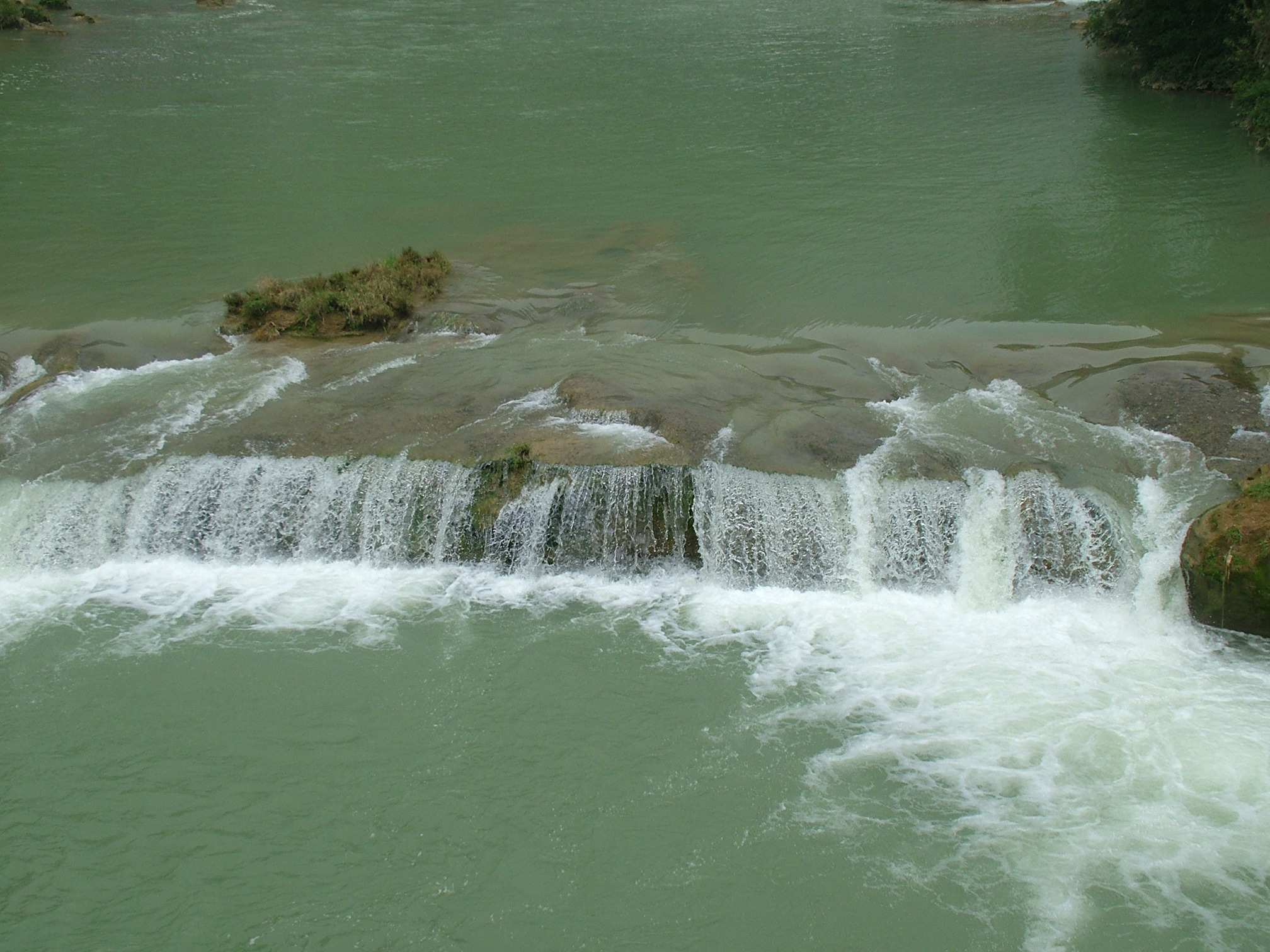
Nearby Xiniutan Waterfall (犀牛潭瀑布).

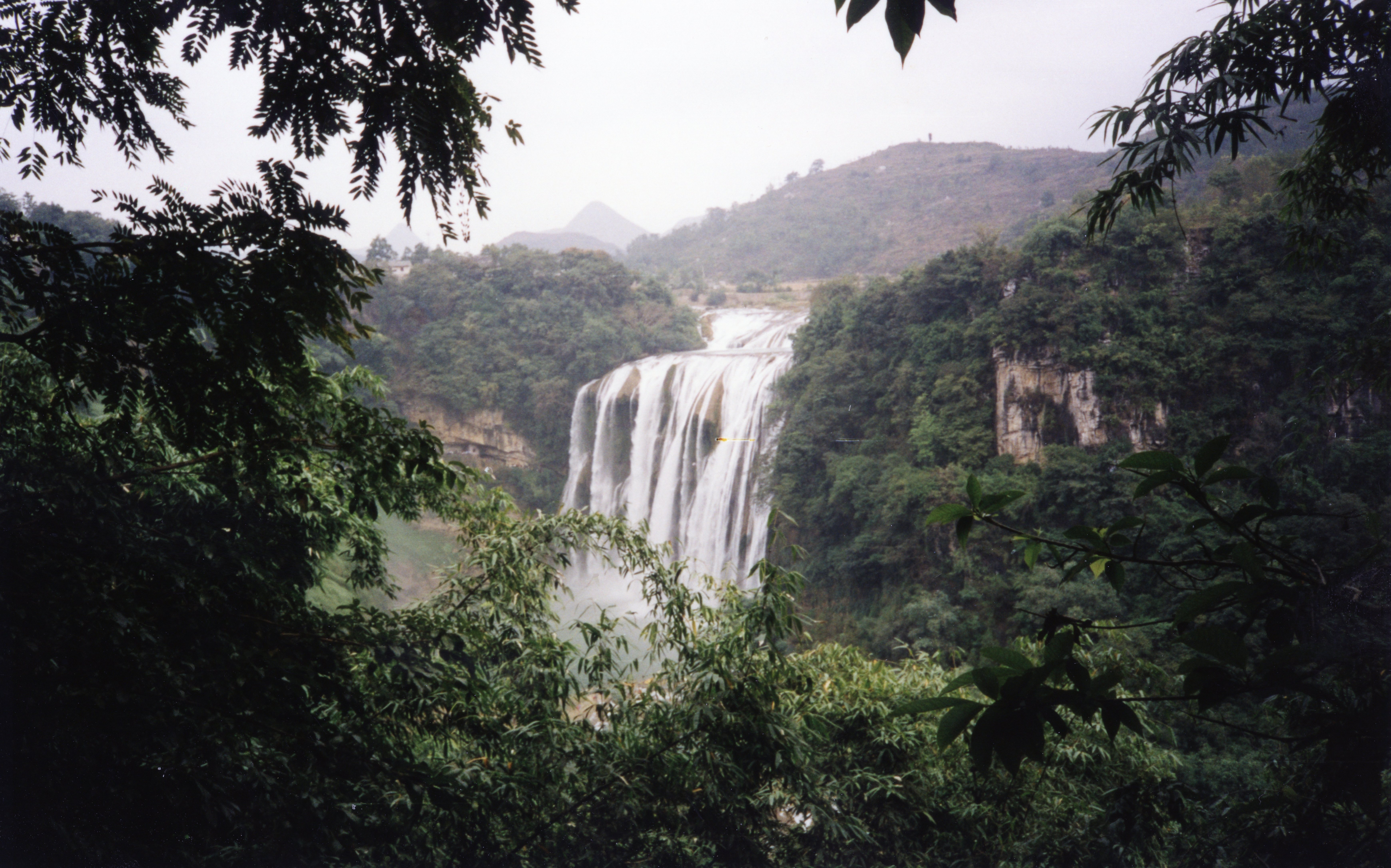
A view of Huangguoshu Waterfall from across and above the river

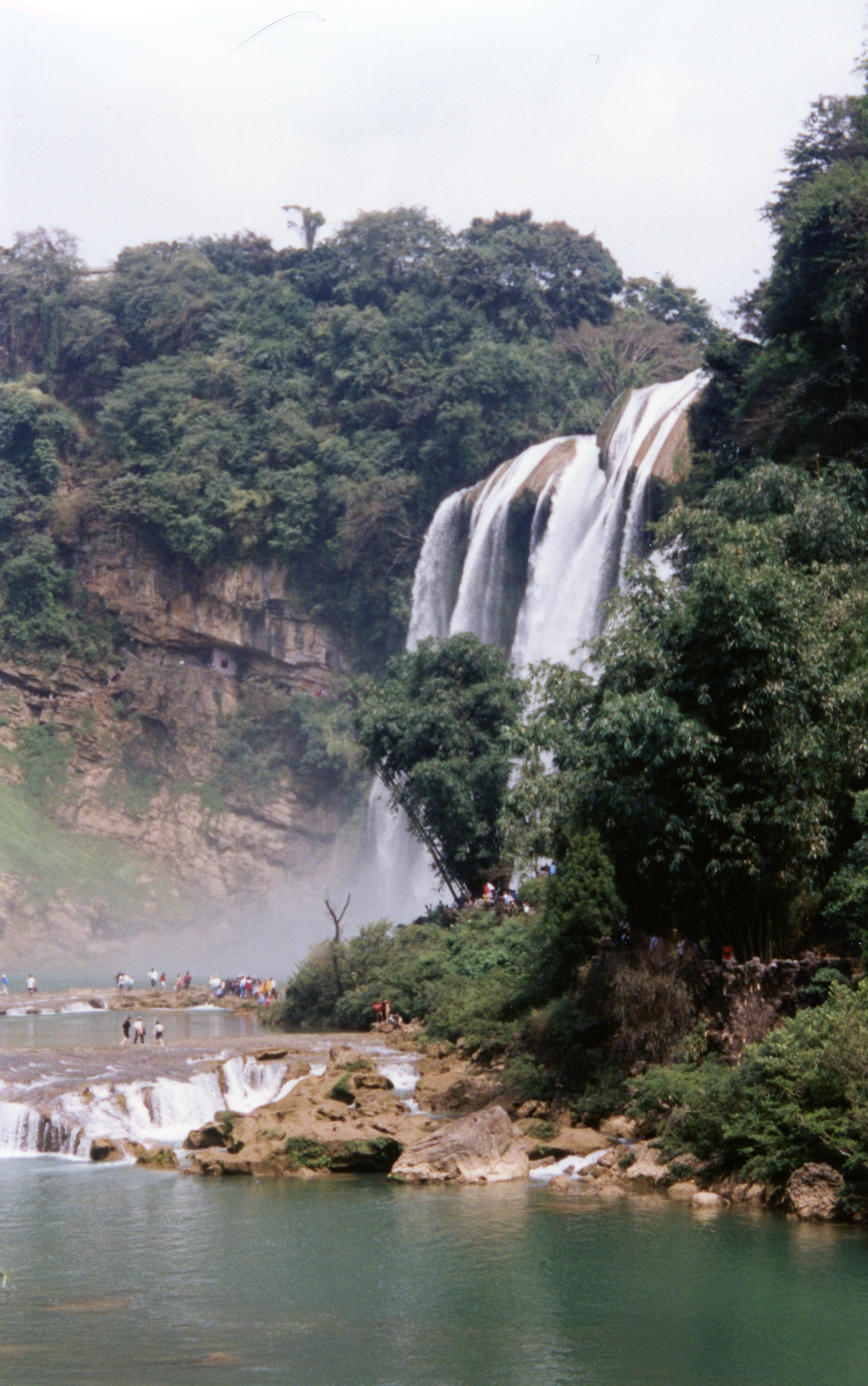

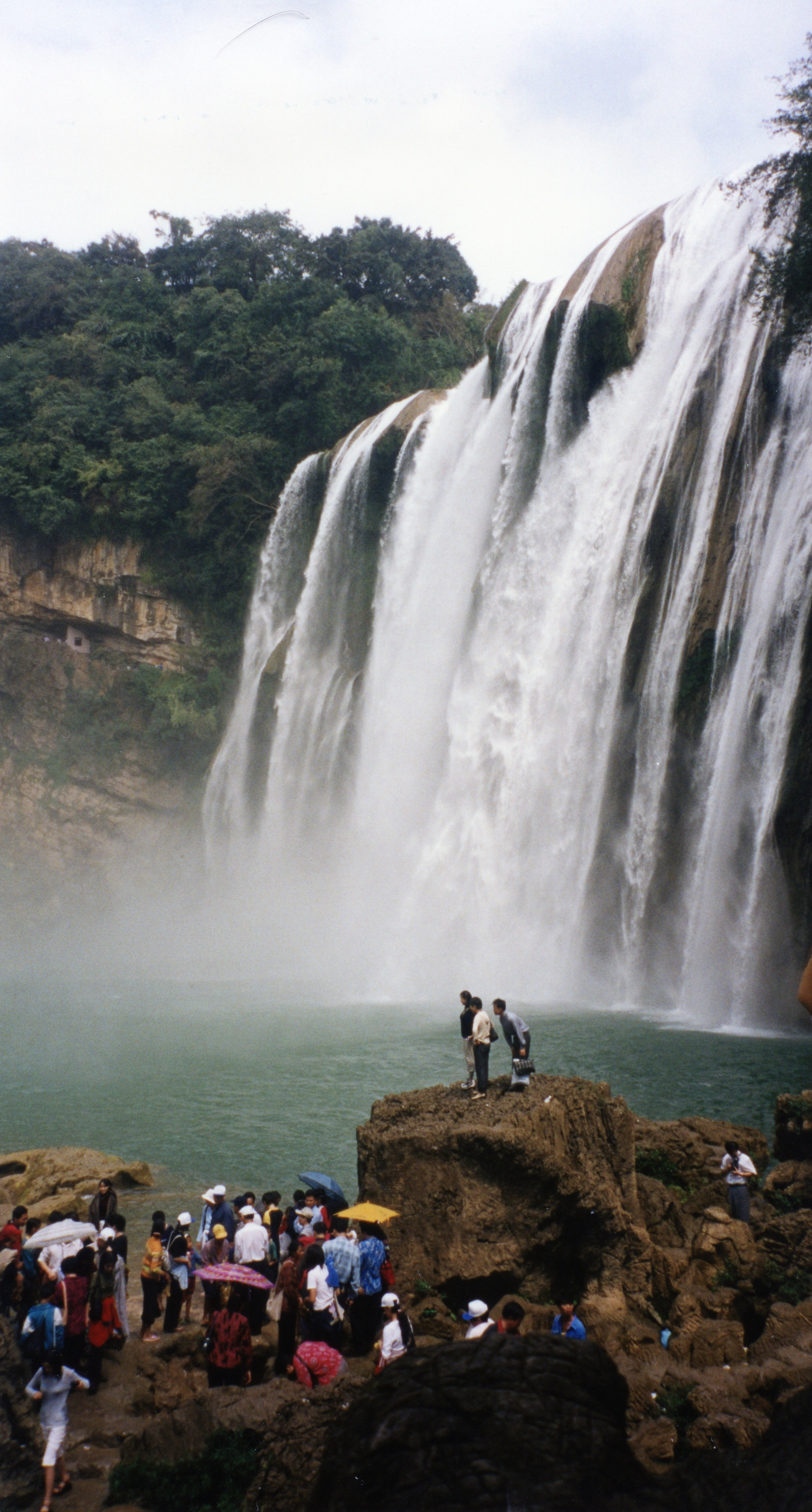

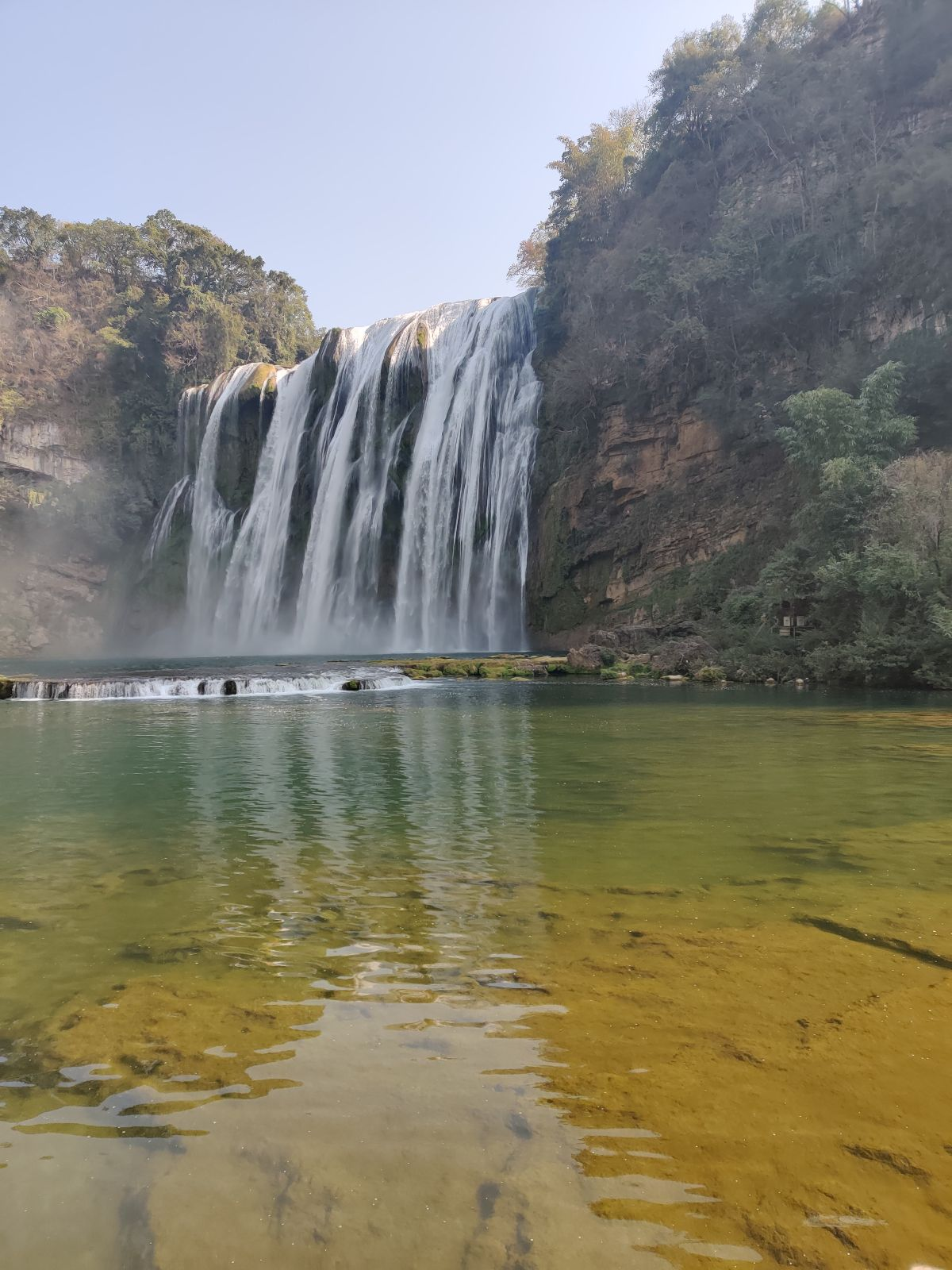

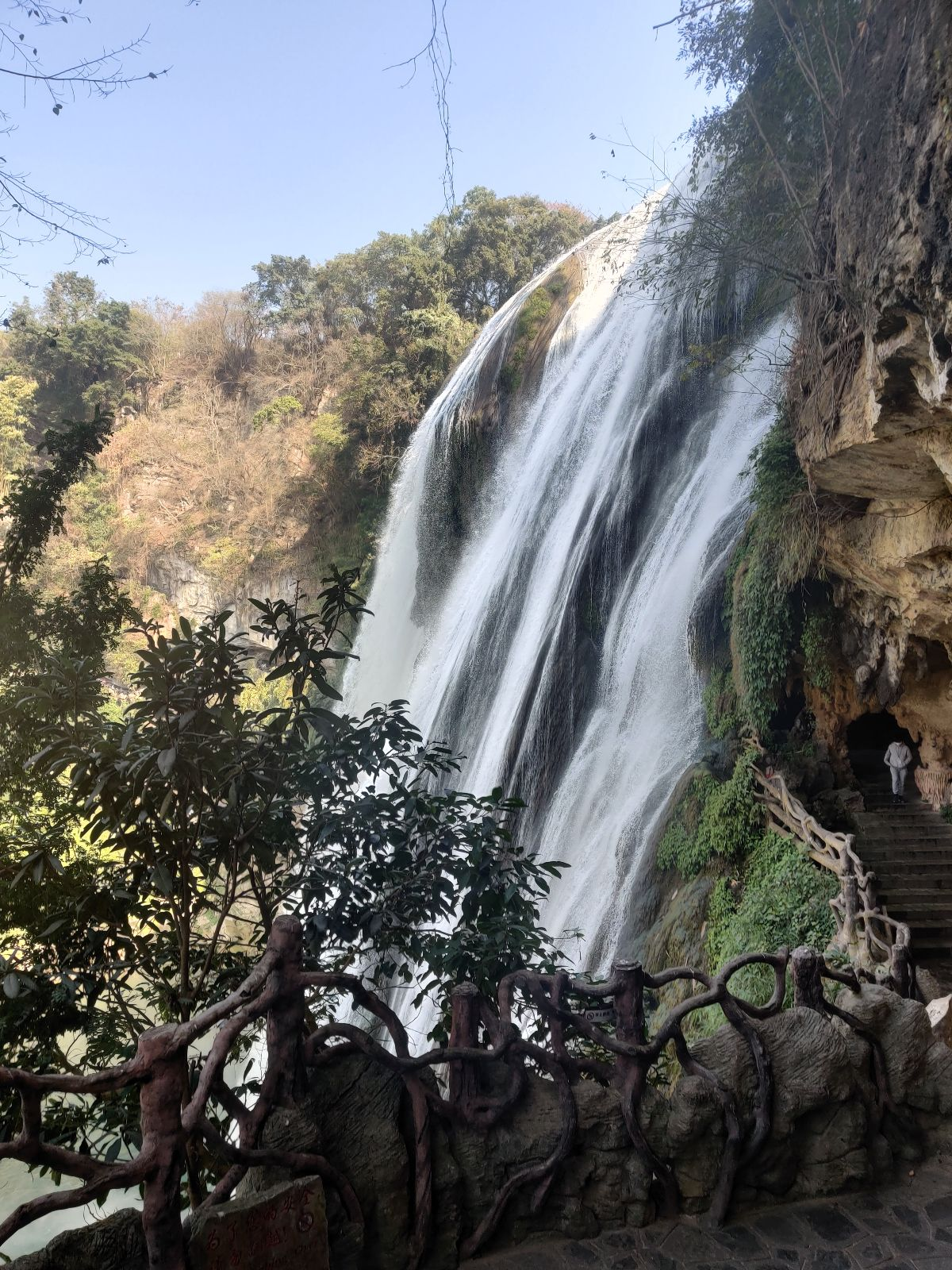

== See also ==
- Detian Falls
- List of waterfalls
