= Huachu =

Huachu Town 化处镇
- Town
- Location in Guizhou.
- Coordinates: 26.227536°N 105.64103°E
- Country: China
- Province: Guizhou
- Prefecture-level city: Anshun
- County: Puding County

Area
  - Total: 108.95 km^{2} (42.07 sq mi)

Population (2010)
  - Total: 57,000
  - Density: 520/km^{2} (1,400/sq mi)
- Time zone: UTC+08:00 (China Standard)
- Postal code: 562102
- Area code: 0853

Huachu Town (simplified Chinese: 化处镇; traditional Chinese: 化處鎮; pinyin: Huàchǔ Zhèn) is a rural town in Puding County, Guizhou, China. It is surrounded by Machang Town on the north, Dayong Town on the west, Maguan Town on the east, and Mugang Town on the south. As of the 2010 census it had a population of 57,000 and an area of 108.95-square-kilometre (42.07 sq mi).

== Administrative division ==
As of January 2016, the town is divided into 1 community, Huachu Community (Chinese: 化处社区), and 34 villages: Huachu (Chinese: 化处村), Boren (Chinese: 播仁村), Shuijing (Chinese: 水井村), Shuimu (Chinese: 水母村), Jiawo (Chinese: 戛卧村), Jiaojia (Chinese: 焦家村), Dongkou (Chinese: 硐口村), Tianba (Chinese: 田坝村), Duobei (Chinese: 朵贝村), Bogai (Chinese: 播改村), Laliu (Chinese: 腊柳村), Mirun (Chinese: 米润村), Huachu Xinzhai (Chinese: 化处新寨村), Hujiawan (Chinese: 胡家湾村), Xiongjialin (Chinese: 熊家林村), Zhangjiazhai (Chinese: 张家寨村), Lingai (Chinese: 林改村), Jiada (Chinese: 戛打村), Boza (Chinese: 播咱村), Shuimu Xinzhai (Chinese: 水母新寨村), Xiashuimu (Chinese: 下水母村), Pianpo (Chinese: 偏坡村), Baiguo (Chinese: 白果村), Taojiazhai (Chinese: 陶家寨村), Laoshuimu (Chinese: 老水母村), Yuanbei (Chinese: 苑贝村), Houshan (Chinese: 后山村), Huoba (Chinese: 火把村), Xiazhichang (Chinese: 下纸厂), Changjing (Chinese: 长菁村), Yanfeng (Chinese: 岩峰村), Lanba (Chinese: 滥坝村), Shanmu (Chinese: 杉木村), and Shabao (Chinese: 沙包村).

== Geography ==
=== Climate ===
The town experience a subtropical plateau monthly rheumatic and moist climate, enjoying four distinct seasons and abundant precipitation. It has an average annual temperature of 15.1 °C (59.2 °F).

== Economy ==
This area is rich in coal, magnesium and granite.

The Duobei Tribute Tea (Chinese: 朵贝贡茶) is a local characteristic cash crop.

== Transportation ==
The Puding-Sanbanqiao Road passes across the town.

== Religion ==
Xianren Temple (Chinese: 仙人寺) is a Buddhist temple in the town.

== See also ==
- List of township-level divisions of Guizhou
