= Tianlong Tunbao =

Historic town in Guizhou, China

Coordinates: 26.355°N 106.157°E

Tianlong Tunbao (also spelled Tunpu) (simplified Chinese:天龙屯堡) is a historic town and tourist attraction located near Anshun city of Guizhou province in China. The town is home to members of the Tunbao, an officially unrecognized ethnic group of Han people originally descended from members of an army sent on an expedition to Guizhou during the Hongwu reign of the Ming Dynasty. The traditional homes and customs of the Tunbao have been preserved, including performances of the DIxi opera or "ground opera". Located next to the town is the Tiantaishan Wulong Temple (Simplified Chinese: 天台山伍龙寺), a former stronghold of Ming Dynasty general Wu Sangui.
