= 2022 Guizhou bus crash =

2022 road incident in China

Details
- Date: 18 September 2022; 2:40 a.m.
- Location: Sandu County, Qiannan, Guizhou, China
- Coordinates: 25.969495°N 107.809649°E

Statistics
- Vehicles: 1
- Passengers: 47
- Deaths: 27
- Injured: 20

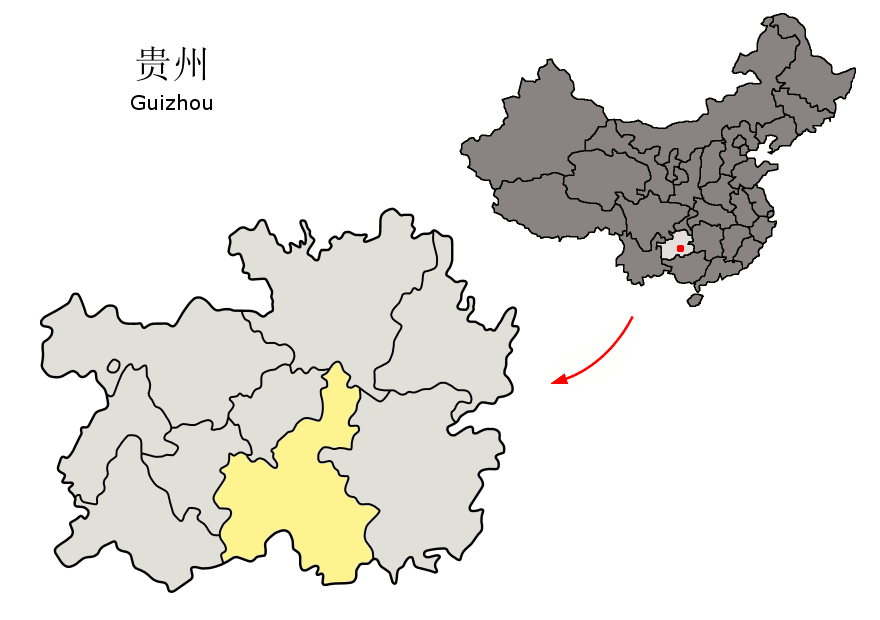
Location of Quiannan Prefecture within Guizhou Province of the People's Republic of China

In the early morning of 18 September 2022, 27 people were killed and 20 injured in a bus crash in Sandu Shui Autonomous County, Qiannan Prefecture, Guizhou, People's Republic of China (PRC). The bus overturned on a hilly section of the highway that goes from Guiyang to Libo. The bus was transporting 47 people to a quarantine facility.

The accident occurred at 2:40 a.m. A circulating unverified photo shows a passenger bus towed by a truck, with a completely crumpled top.

== Background ==
China is a country with zero-COVID policies, where cities goes into a lockdown after a few positive cases. Local officials are responsible for controlling the virus and keeping outbreaks under control. The COVID-19 data of the day of the crash showed Guizhou had a spike in cases from 154 to 712 new confirmed cases the day before, being almost 70% of new COVID cases in China. It was announced that due to limited capacity in Guiyang, people needed quarantine "need to be transported to sister cities and states".

According to the Specification for road passenger transportation enterprise safety management (Chinese: 《道路旅客运输企业安全管理规范》), passenger buses are not allowed to drive on the highway from 2 a.m. to 5 a.m.

== Crash ==
The bus departed from Yunyan District at 12:10 a.m., carrying 47 people, 45 of whom were "related to the COVID-19", plus one driver and one staff. When the bus was on the way from Sandu Shui Autonomous County to Libo County, leaving 32 kilometres (20 mi) from the Sandu County at 2:40 a.m., the bus overturned and fell into the roadside deep ditch.

== Legal ==
As a result of the public anger, it was announced on 20 September that three officials in charge of the Yunyan district were fired by Guiyang.

== Reactions ==
The accident caused anger by Chinese citizens over the strict COVID policies in China and the lack of transparency from authorities. It also raised commotion that the bus was traveling during the night, while many major roads in the region were closed. A woman who claimed to be the daughter of one of the victims wrote a note on social media saying she could "not accept" her mother's death.

Multiple widely shared blogs about the accident, particularly the critical ones, were deleted from WeChat. One of the most popular comments about the crash at WeChat is: "All of us are on this bus", indicating a form of powerlessness. The accident became on Sunday afternoon a top trending topic at Weibo, but suddenly it disappeared from the top-50 trending topics.

Hu Xijin, the former editor in chief of the Global Times and usually a defender of the zero-COVID policy, doubted why the bus was still on the way after 2 a.m. He questioned on Sina Weibo that "why did Guiyang city have to transport quarantine subjects in a manner that is suspected of serious violations?" and "for such a large-scale, long-distance transport, did it really have to be done so late at night, and was there really no alternative?"

During a press conference, the deputy mayor of Guiyang apologized for the accident, bowed and had a moment of silence.

== See also ==
- Anshun bus crash, a 2020 Guizhou bus crash
- List of traffic collisions (2000–present)
- 2022 COVID-19 protests in China
