= Tunbao =

Tunpu people
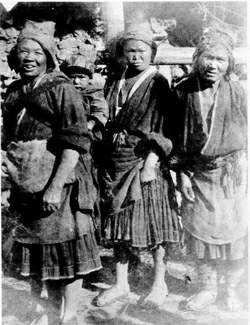
- Tunpu women, 1920s

Total population
- about 300,000

Regions with significant populations
- Anshun, Guizhou, China

Languages
- Southwestern Mandarin

Religion
- Chinese folk religion, Buddhism, Daoism

Related ethnic groups
- Chuanqing people, Han Chinese (especially Hakkas)

The Tunbao or Tunpu (Chinese: 屯堡) are an ethnic subgroup of the Han Chinese, located in Guizhou and Yunnan provinces, China. The Tunbao are descended from ethnic Han who were part of an army sent on an expedition to Guizhou during the reign of the Ming dynasty's Hongwu Emperor. Long thought to have been a non-Han ethnic minority, their Han origins were proven by Japanese anthropologist Torii Ryuzo in 1896. The Tunbao have preserved much of their culture, costumes, and language from the Ming era.

The Tianlong Tunbao town, located near Anshun is a historic site where Tunbao homes and customs have been preserved, including the traditional Dixi opera or "ground opera" performances.

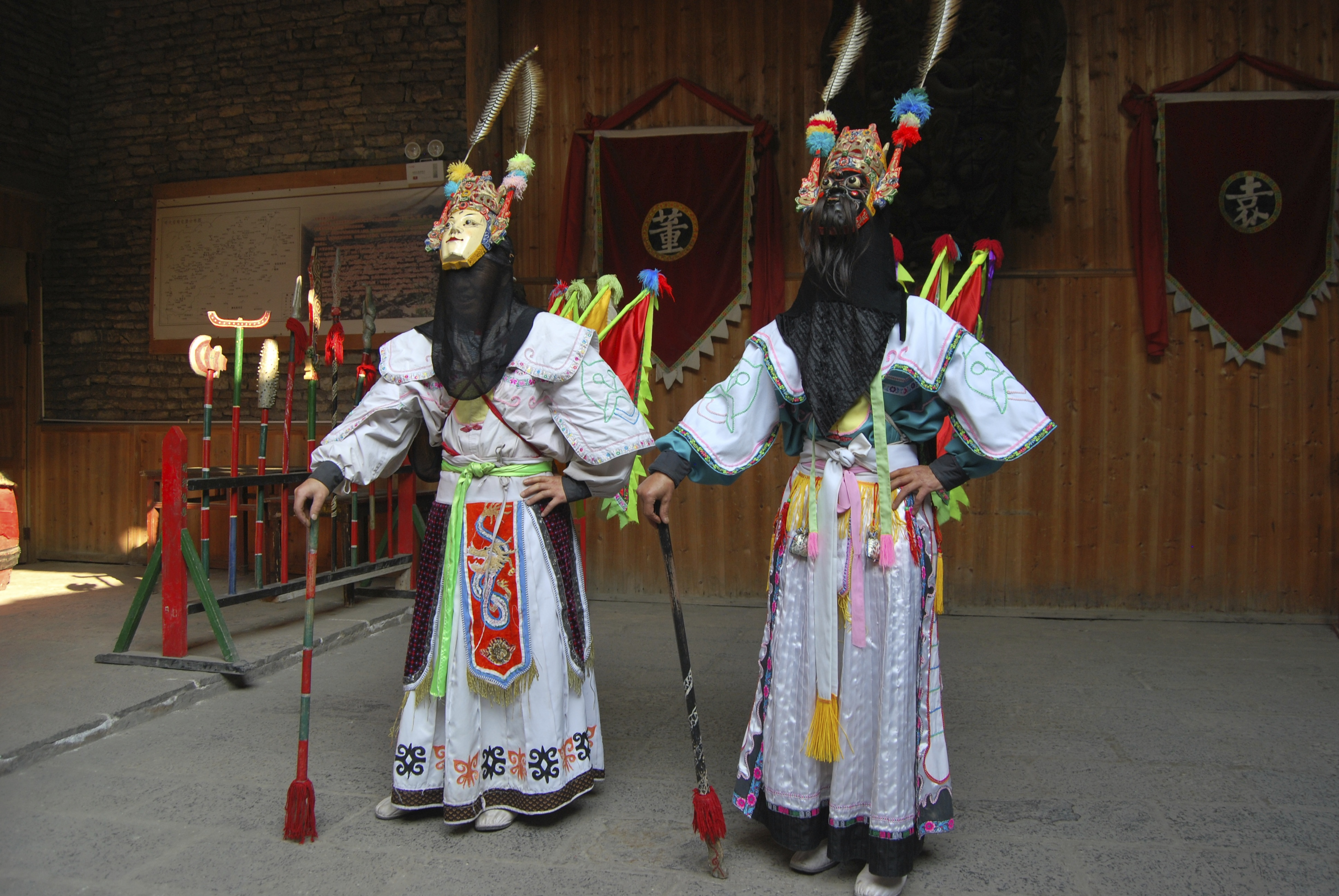
Tunbao village traditional mask dance in Ming era costumes
