= Tiantaishan Wulong Temple =

Temple near Anshun, Pingba County, China

Coordinates: 26.3642°N 106.1625°E

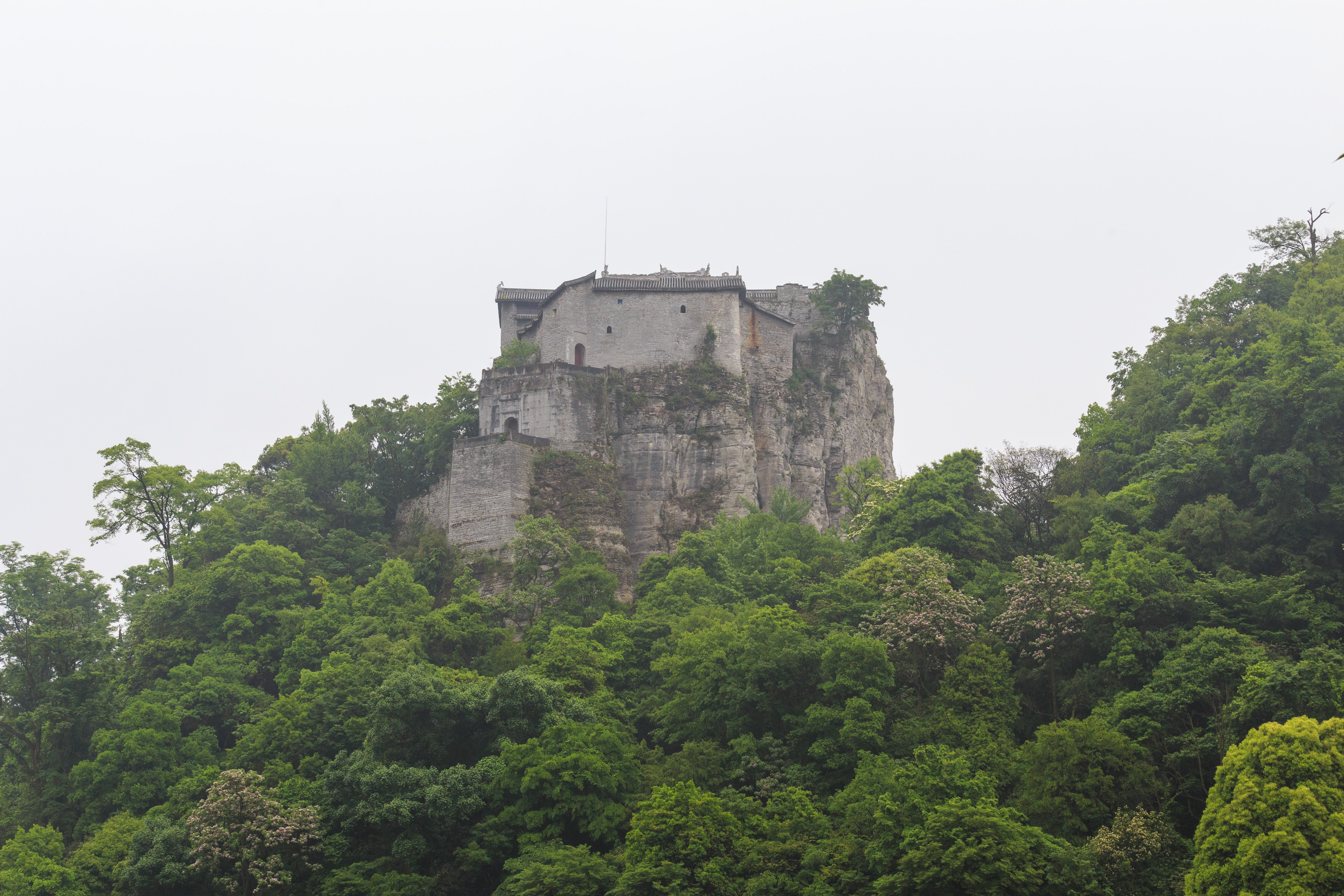
Tiantaishan Wulong Temple

Tiantaishan Wulong Temple (Chinese: 天台山伍龙寺) is a tourist attraction located near Anshun city in Pingba County of Guizhou Province, China. It is located close to the Tianlong Tunbao (屯堡) town. It is one of the Major National Historical and Cultural Sites of Guizhou. The combined hilltop fortress and Buddhist temple was built in the Ming Dynasty and was once home to famous Ming general Wu Sangui. Several relics of Wu Sangui are on display including his sword, robe, and water bucket. There is also an exhibit of costumes and photos from local Dixi Opera or "ground opera" performances.
