= Xixiu, Anshun =

Xixiu 西秀区
- District
- Location of the seat in Guizhou Xixiu (Southwest China)
- Coordinates (Xixiu District government): 26°14′43″N 105°57′55″E
- Country: China
- Province: Guizhou
- Prefecture-level city: Anshun
- District seat: Dongguan Subdistrict

Area
  - Total: 1,705 km^{2} (658 sq mi)

Population (2020 census)
  - Total: 870,441
  - Density: 510.5/km^{2} (1,322/sq mi)
- Time zone: UTC+8 (China Standard)
- Postal code: 561000
- Website: www.xixiu.gov.cn

Xixiu District (simplified Chinese: 西秀区; traditional Chinese: 西秀區; pinyin: Xīxiù Qū) is a district in the prefecture-level city of Anshun, Guizhou Province, China. The district spans an area of 1,705 square kilometres, and has a population of 765,399 people as of the 2010 Chinese Census.

== Geography ==
The district is home to a number of rivers which belong to the larger Yangtze River watershed and the Pearl River watershed. Much of the district's landscape is characterized by karst topography.

=== Climate ===
Xixiu District has an average annual temperature of 14 °C, and an average annual precipitation of 1356 millimetres.

== Administrative divisions ==
Xixiu District administers 8 subdistricts, 10 towns, 2 townships, and 5 ethnic townships.

8 subdistricts

- Nanjie Subdistrict (南街街道)
- Dongjie Subdistrict (东街街道)
- Xijie Subdistrict (西街街道)
- Beijie Subdistrict (北街街道)
- Dongguan Subdistrict (东关街道)
- Huaxi Subdistrict (华西街道)
- Xihang Subdistrict (西航街道)
- Xin'an Subdistrict (新安街道)

10 towns

- Songqi (宋旗镇)
- Yaopu (幺铺镇)
- Ninggu (宁谷镇)
- Longgong (龙宫镇)
- Shuangbao (双堡镇)
- Daxiqiao (大西桥镇)
- Qiyanqiao (七眼桥镇)
- Caiguan (蔡官镇)
- Jiaozishan (轿子山镇)
- Jiuzhou (旧州镇)

2 townships

- Dongtun Township (东屯乡)
- Liuguan Township (刘官乡)

5 ethnic townships

- Xinchang Bouyei and Miao Ethnic Township (新场布依族苗族乡)
- Yanla Miao and Bouyei Ethnic Township (岩腊苗族布依族乡)
- Jichang Bouyei and Miao Ethnic Township (鸡场布依族苗族乡)
- Yangwu Bouyei and Miao Ethnic Township (杨武布依族苗族乡)
- Huangla Bouyei and Miao Ethnic Township (黄腊布依族苗族乡)

== Economy ==
In 2018, the district's GDP totaled 32.59 billion Yuan and retail sales totaled 7.956 billion Yuan.

Significant mineral deposits in Xixiu District include coal, iron, and marble.

== Transportation ==
The Guizhou–Huangping Highway (贵黄高速公路), a section of National Highway 320 runs through the district.

The Guizhou–Kunming railway and the Anshun–Liupanshui intercity railway both run through the district.
