= Anshun =

Anshun 安顺市
- Prefecture-level city
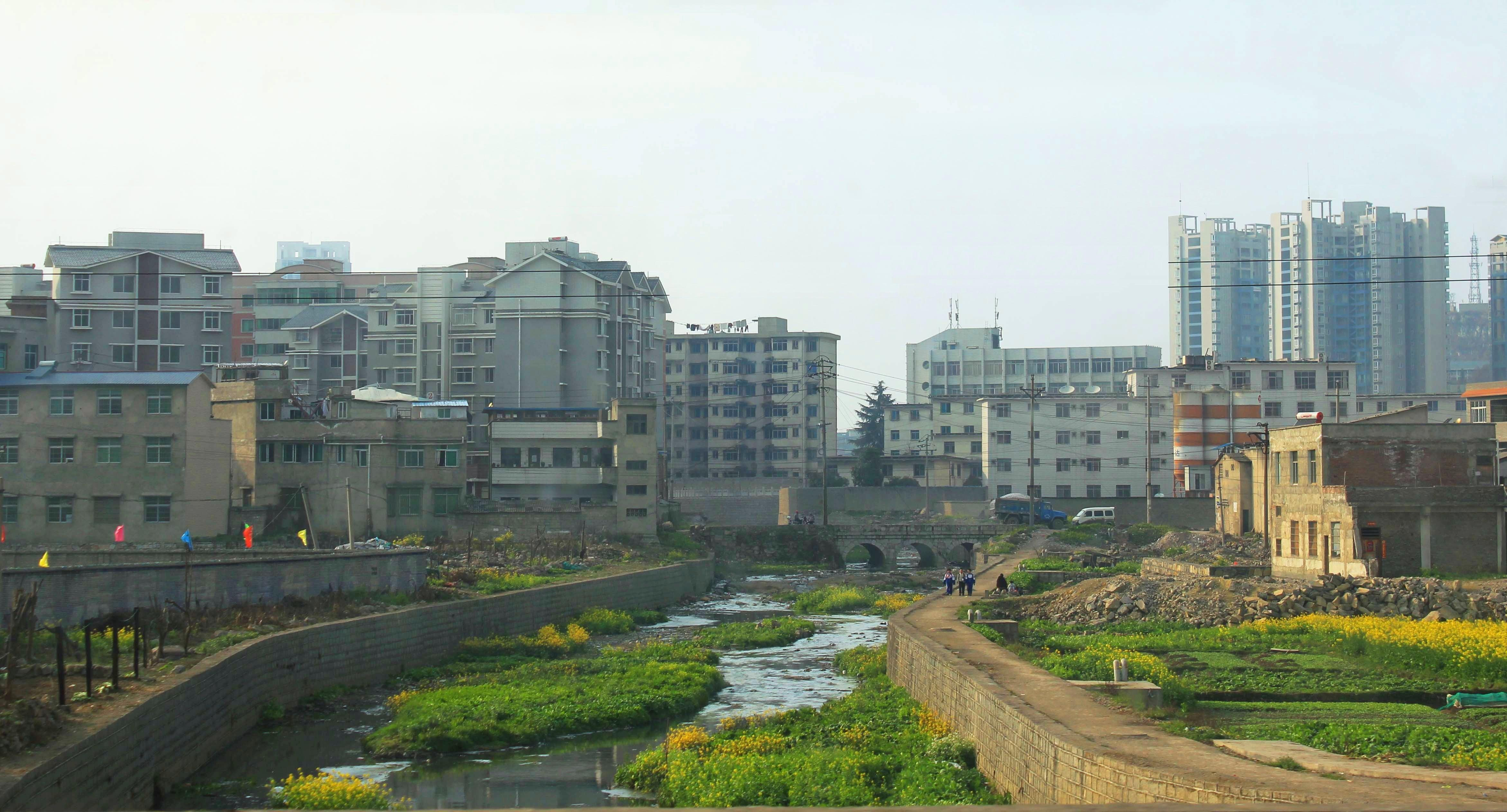

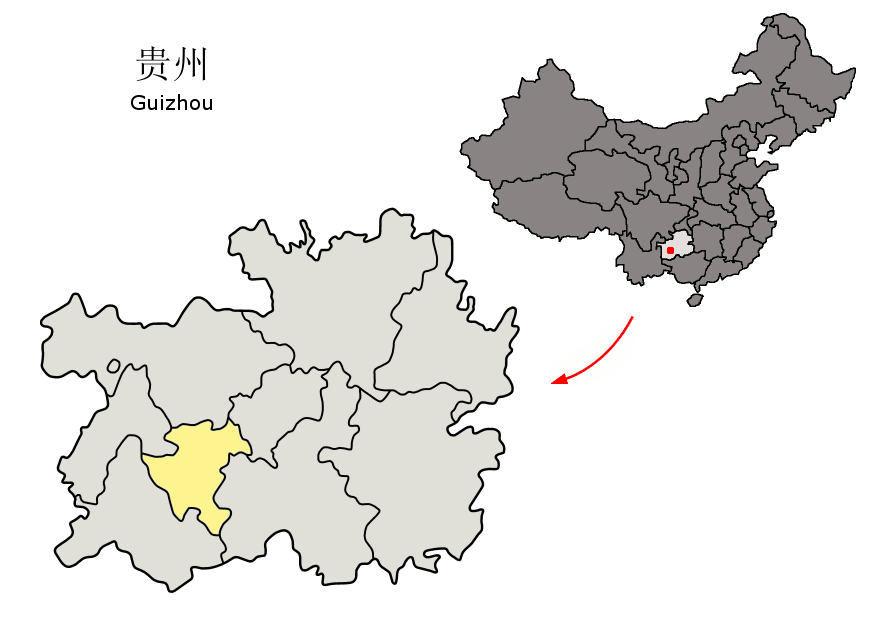
- Location of Anshun City jurisdiction in Guizhou

- Location of the city center in Guizhou Anshun (Southwest China) Anshun (China)
- Coordinates (Anshun municipal government): 26°15′11″N 105°56′51″E
- Country: People's Republic of China
- Province: Guizhou
- Municipal seat: Xixiu District

Area
  - Prefecture-level city: 9,269 km^{2} (3,579 sq mi)
  - Urban: 1,724.24 km^{2} (665.73 sq mi)
  - Metro: 1,724.24 km^{2} (665.73 sq mi)
- Elevation: 1,380 m (4,530 ft)

Population (2010 census)
  - Prefecture-level city: 2,297,339
  - Density: 247.9/km^{2} (641.9/sq mi)
  - Urban: 765,313
  - Urban density: 443.855/km^{2} (1,149.58/sq mi)
  - Metro: 765,313
  - Metro density: 443.855/km^{2} (1,149.58/sq mi)

GDP
  - Prefecture-level city: CN¥ 96.7 billion US$ 14.0 billion
  - Per capita: CN¥ 39,160; US$ 5,678
- Time zone: UTC+8 (China Standard)
- Postal code: 561000
- Area code: 0851
- ISO 3166 code: CN-GZ-04
- Website: anshun.gov.cn

Anshun (simplified Chinese: 安顺; traditional Chinese: 安順; pinyin: Ānshùn) is a prefecture-level city located in southwestern Guizhou province, southwest China, near the Huangguoshu Waterfall, the tallest in China. As of the 2010 census, it had a population of 2,297,339. The city proper had a population of 765,313. Within the prefecture are attractions such as The Long Gong Dragon Caves and the Getu River.

== History ==
During the Warring States period, the area belonged to the independent kingdom of Yelang. The Records of the Grand Historian states that of all the independent kingdoms in the area, Yelang was the largest. The kingdom was located along Zangke River (now called Beipan River), and Nanpan River. Bamboo Worship, Cow Totems, bullfights and dogfights were the culture traditions of the Yelang Empire. In 111 BCE, Yelang was conquered by the Han dynasty, and incorporated as Zangke Commandery. From 28 BCE to 25 BCE, an insurrection against Emperor Cheng called for the reinstatement of the Yelang Kingdom, but was crushed by Han forces.

In the Three Kingdoms period, the area was split between the county of Yelang and the county of Qielan within Yi Province.

Under the Jin dynasty, the area of present-day Anshun would fall under the jurisdiction of Guangtan County (廣談縣) within Yi Province.

During the Sui dynasty, the area belonged to Binhua County (宾化縣), located within Zangke Commandery, Zang Province.

This organization of the region remained intact until the latter portion of the Tang dynasty, when it was re-organized under the Puning Commandery. The area would remain under the Puning Commandery until 1292, when, under the Yuan dynasty, the area would fall under Puding Prefecture, which it would remain under until 1372.

Anshun Prefecture was established during the early Ming dynasty to govern the region, and would remain until 1602, when it was replaced by the Anshun Military and Civil Administration (安順軍民府). The area was incorporated into the Qing dynasty in 1658, and a new Anshun Prefecture was established. In April 1638, Xu Xiake, the greatest travel writer and geographer of ancient China, traveled to Anshun.

In 1673, the area became engulfed under the Revolt of the Three Feudatories, during which, significant fighting took place in Anshun.

The Anshun Prefecture would remain until January 15, 1913, when the Republic of China revoked the prefecture system. After a short-lived implementation of a county to govern Anshun, the city was placed under Guizhou West Circuit, until reverting to the county system.

In 1950, Anshun Prefecture was established, governing 6 county-level divisions. In 1958, Anshun County (安顺县) was upgraded to serve as a county-level city. In 1970, Anshun Prefecture was re-organized as Anshun Area (安顺地区), which it would remain until June 23, 2000, when it was re-organized as a prefecture-level city.

== Geography and climate ==
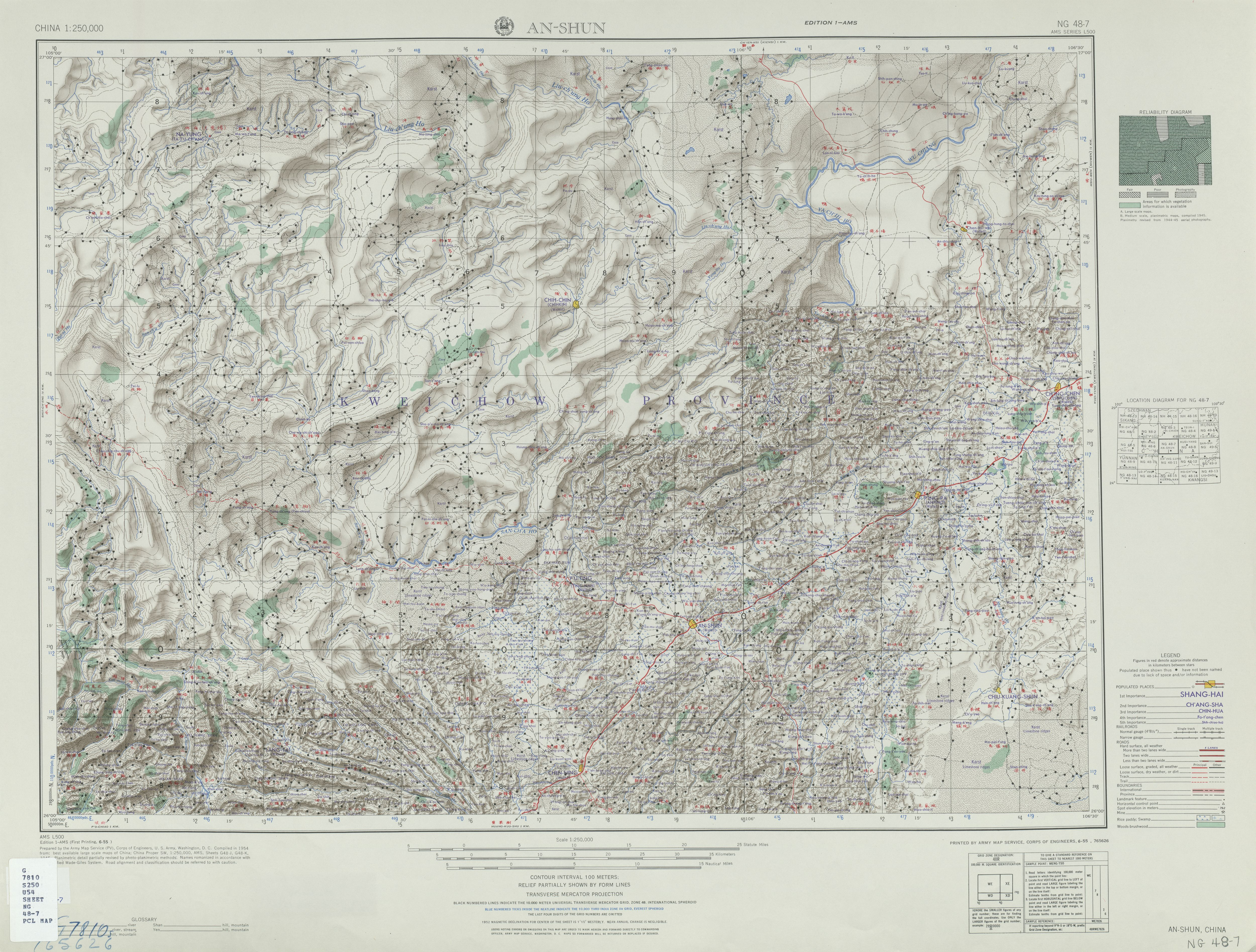
Map including Anshun (labeled as AN-SHUN (Walled) 安順) (AMS, 1954)

Anshun's administrative area spans latitude 25° 21′−26° 38′ N and longitude 105° 13′−106° 34′ E and contains sizeable areas of karst formation. It borders Guiyang, the provincial capital, and Qiannan Buyei and Miao Autonomous Prefecture to the east, Liupanshui to the west, Qianxinan Buyei and Miao Autonomous Prefecture to the south, and Bijie to the north. Within the prefecture, the elevation ranges from 1,102 to 1,694 metres (3,615 to 5,558 ft).

Anshun has a monsoon-influenced humid subtropical climate (Köppen Cwa) bordering on a subtropical highland climate (Köppen Cwb), tempered by its rather high altitude and having frequent rain (falling on just over half of the days of the year) and high humidity year-round. Winters are short, cool and damp, while summers are very warm. The monthly 24-hour mean temperature ranges from 4.5 °C (40.1 °F) in January to 22.0 °C (71.6 °F) in July, and the annual mean is 14.22 °C (57.6 °F). Over two-thirds of the annual rainfall occurs from May to August.

Climate data for Anshun, elevation 1,431 m (4,695 ft), (1991–2020 normals, extremes 1971–2010)
Month	Jan	Feb	Mar	Apr	May	Jun	Jul	Aug	Sep	Oct	Nov	Dec	Year
Record high °C (°F)	21.9 (71.4)	26.1 (79.0)	31.8 (89.2)	32.2 (90.0)	33.4 (92.1)	31.0 (87.8)	32.4 (90.3)	32.5 (90.5)	31.7 (89.1)	27.7 (81.9)	24.0 (75.2)	22.3 (72.1)	33.4 (92.1)
Mean daily maximum °C (°F)	7.5 (45.5)	10.8 (51.4)	15.4 (59.7)	20.3 (68.5)	22.9 (73.2)	24.4 (75.9)	25.9 (78.6)	26.2 (79.2)	23.5 (74.3)	18.5 (65.3)	14.9 (58.8)	9.5 (49.1)	18.3 (65.0)
Daily mean °C (°F)	4.3 (39.7)	6.9 (44.4)	10.7 (51.3)	15.5 (59.9)	18.6 (65.5)	20.6 (69.1)	22.0 (71.6)	21.9 (71.4)	19.4 (66.9)	15.1 (59.2)	11.2 (52.2)	6.2 (43.2)	14.4 (57.9)
Mean daily minimum °C (°F)	2.3 (36.1)	4.3 (39.7)	7.8 (46.0)	12.3 (54.1)	15.5 (59.9)	18.1 (64.6)	19.5 (67.1)	19.0 (66.2)	16.5 (61.7)	12.8 (55.0)	8.7 (47.7)	3.9 (39.0)	11.7 (53.1)
Record low °C (°F)	−5.2 (22.6)	−4.8 (23.4)	−5.9 (21.4)	1.3 (34.3)	6.7 (44.1)	11.1 (52.0)	10.7 (51.3)	13.6 (56.5)	8.5 (47.3)	3.7 (38.7)	−2.4 (27.7)	−5.7 (21.7)	−5.9 (21.4)
Average precipitation mm (inches)	25.6 (1.01)	21.3 (0.84)	33.5 (1.32)	67.7 (2.67)	170.8 (6.72)	297.3 (11.70)	237.8 (9.36)	171.8 (6.76)	113.0 (4.45)	95.5 (3.76)	35.2 (1.39)	19.0 (0.75)	1,288.5 (50.73)
Average precipitation days (≥ 0.1 mm)	16.1	13.4	15.3	14.4	17.3	18.7	17.5	15.0	12.5	16.1	11.7	12.9	180.9
Average snowy days	4.5	2.7	0.4	0	0	0	0	0	0	0	0.2	1.6	9.4
Average relative humidity (%)	84	81	78	76	76	81	81	79	78	82	80	81	80
Mean monthly sunshine hours	45.1	66.2	95.4	129.1	133.6	105.5	153.1	172.3	126.3	80.5	89.2	61.3	1,257.6
Percentage possible sunshine	14	21	26	34	32	26	37	43	35	23	28	19	28
Source 1: China Meteorological Administration
Source 2: Weather China

== Administrative divisions ==
Anshun administers one district, two counties, and three autonomous counties. In addition, there are two other administrative areas: the Anshun Economic Development Zone (安顺经济开发区) and the national-level Huangguoshu Scenic Area (黄果树风景名胜区).

Map
Division code	English name	Simp. Chinese	Trad. Chinese	Pinyin	Area in km^{2}	Seat	Postal code	Divisions					
Division code	English name	Simp. Chinese	Trad. Chinese	Pinyin	Area in km^{2}	Seat	Postal code	Subdistricts	Towns	Townships	Ethnic townships	Residential communities	Villages
520400	Anshun	安顺市	安順市	Ānshùn Shì	9253.06	Xixiu District	561000	7	44	36	11	106	1837
520402	Xixiu District	西秀区	西秀區	Xīxiù Qū	1724.24	Dongguan Subdistrict (东关街道)	561000	7	10	7	5	57	498
520403	Pingba District	平坝区	平壩區	Píngbà Xiàn	985.49	Anping Subdistrict (安平街道)	561100	2	7		2	17	193
520422	Puding County	普定县	普定縣	Pǔdìng Xiàn	1090.49	Chengguan (城关镇)	562100		5	6	4	10	317
520423	Zhenning Buyei and Miao Autonomous County	镇宁布依族苗族自治县	鎮寧布依族苗族自治縣	Zhènníng Bùyīzú; Miáozú Zìzhìxiàn	1709.42	Chengguan (城关镇)	561200		8	8		6	365
520424	Guanling Buyei and Miao Autonomous County	关岭布依族苗族自治县	關嶺布依族苗族自治縣	Guānlǐng Bùyīzú; Miáozú Zìzhìxiàn	1470.49	Guansuo Subdistrict (关索街道)	561300		8	5		8	241
520425	Ziyun Miao and Buyei Autonomous County	紫云苗族布依族自治县	紫雲苗族布依族自治縣	Zǐyún Miáozú; Bùyīzú Zìzhìxiàn	2272.94	Songshan (松山镇)	550800		5	7		6	223
Note: Xixiu District includes one subdistrict and two towns of the Anshun Economic Development Zone, while the two towns of Huangguoshu Scenic Area, Huangguoshu (黄果树镇) and Baishui (白水镇), are administered by Zhenning and Guanling Counties, respectively.

== Economy ==
As of 2019, the city's GDP totaled 92.394 billion Yuan, an increase of 8.1% from 2018. 17.0% of the city's GDP came from the primary sector, 31.7% from the secondary sector, and 51.3% from the tertiary sector.

Major agricultural products grown in Anshun include rice, yams, maize, rapeseed, watermelons, and various vegetables. The city is also home to a sizable animal husbandry industry, which produces mostly pork, but also significant amounts of beef, poultry, and mutton.

Anshun's industry produces both consumer goods and intermediate goods. Major consumer goods produced in the city include detergent, various paper products, liquors, Chinese traditional medicine, and mobile phones. Major intermediate goods produced in the city include construction materials such as stone and cement, raw aluminium, barium salt, and rolling bearings.

In recent years, the city has played an important role in the development of military aircraft, with significant production taking place in the city, and with Anshun Huangguoshu Airport serving as a testing ground for new military aircraft. In 2019, the city government announced an initiative to further increase the city's aerospace industry over the next few years.

== Demographics ==
Anshun City Demographics
Name				
Name	Residence population(Nov. 2010)			Hukou population (end of 2010)
Name	Total	%	Population density (persons/km^{2})	Hukou population (end of 2010)
Anshun	2297339	100	247.91	2797871
Xixiu District	765313	33.31	449.13	868669
Pingba County	298034	12.97	298.33	353777
Puding County	378288	16.47	346.42	459605
Zhenning Buyei and Miao Autonomous County	283880	12.36	165.05	381192
Guanling Buyei and Miao Autonomous County	301562	13.13	205.42	366814
Ziyun Miao and Buyei Autonomous County	270262	11.76	118.33	367814

According to the Sixth National Population Census of the People's Republic of China conducted in 2010, the residence population was 2,297,339, a reduction of 34,402 (1.48%) from the Fifth Census in 2000. The male-female ratio was 107.34 males per 100 females. Persons aged 0–14 numbered 580,910 (25.29%), 15–64 numbered 1,516,977 (66.03%), and 65+ numbered at 199,452 (8.68%). The urban population was 690,138 (only 30.04%).

=== Ethnic groups ===
Among the residence population, there were 1,466,833 people of Han ethnicity (63.85%), with members of various other ethnic groups taking up the other 36.15%.

==== Tunpo People ====
The city is home to a significant number of Tunpo People, many of whom live in Tianlong Tunbao town.

== Transportation ==
The city sits on the Guiyang-Kunming railway, a section on the Shanghai-Kunming railway. Anshun West railway station serves as a stop on the Shanghai–Kunming high-speed railway, as well as one of two terminals on the Anshun–Liupanshui intercity railway.

Anshun Huangguoshu Airport is located in the city. The airport is a dual-use facilities, offering civilian as well as military air services. The airport's destinations include Chongqing, Guangzhou and Beijing's Daxing Airport. Most travelers choose to use Guiyang Longdongbao International Airport and take a coach between there and Anshun.

The G60 Shanghai–Kunming Expressway and National Highway 320 both run through Anshun.

== Education ==
Anshun Normal University is the largest local institution of higher education, hosting Peace Corps Volunteer TEFL teachers since 2005.

== Famous sites ==
Tourist attractions and landmarks in Anshun include:

- Anshun Wenmiao: This Ming dynasty Confucian temple, situated within Anshun city, is erected to honor the famous philosopher Confucius and his disciples.
- Huangguoshu Waterfall ("Yellow Fruit Tree Waterfall"): A waterfall that can be viewed from all angles, even from inside the waterfall. It is the biggest waterfall in Asia.
- Getu River: the river is situated in a mountainous karst area. Along the river one can find Miao villages and karst caves. It is possible to walk 2000 steps up to the Chuangshang cave where one can get a view of the whole area.
- Longgong Cave (龙宫洞; "Dragon Palace"): The cave is situated above sea level and one has to walk 200 meters upwards to reach it. From there one can sail into the cave and experience the stalagmites and stalactites of the karst formation. There is also a waterfall by the foot of the cave.
- Tianlong Tunbao (屯堡) Ming Dynasty Town: The town is situated some 25 kilometres (16 mi) from downtown Anshun. The name Tunbao refers to the places where the troops were stationed to guard the frontiers after putting down the riots during their southern expedition to Guizhou in the Hongwu reign (1368–1398) of the Ming dynasty. The citizens have stuck to their traditional customs since then. The locals still wear clothes from the Ming dynasty and the houses are also from that era.
- Tiantai Mountain: The mountain lies in Tunbao tourist site. It has a history of approximately 421 years. It is the only one ancient architectural complex in Guizhou Province which is the imitation of Song-dynasty-style. The architectural complex is called The Epic of Stone Architectural. Ming general Wu Sangui once resided here.
- Zhongdong (中洞; Middle Cave): Twenty families live inside this isolated village, set in a humongous limestone cavern 1,800 metres (5,900 ft) up a mountain. It's thought to be the only year-round settlement inside a naturally occurring cave in China.
- Huajiang Canyon: The only canyon which is famous as the "earth surface crack" canyon. Cliffside inscriptions are in the canyon.

== Folk art ==
Anshun Batiks are a traditional folk Chinese handicraft art of Buyi Minority. People use wax pen to draw various patterns on white cloth such as flowers, birds and some strange shapes. Then, the cloth will be dipped dyeing in the indigotin. Finally, the patterns will be white shapes on a blue ground. Baktis can be used to make dresses and some other daily used things.

Dixi Opera is called the "living fossil of Chinese Opera". The acting style is singing and dancing. The main feature is that all actors wear the xylographic masks and sing the opera which are the ancient style.

== See also ==
- Chinese frigate Anshun
