= Liangtian =

Liangtian (Chinese: 良田) may refer to these places in China:

- Liangtian Township, in Jiexi County, Guangdong
- Liangtian Subdistrict, in Linwei District, Weinan, Shaanxi

== Towns ==
- Liangtian, Guangxi, in Luchuan County, Guangxi
- Liangtian, Guizhou, in Zhenning Buyei and Miao Autonomous County, Guizhou
- Liangtian, Hunan, in Chenzhou, Hunan
- Liangtian, Ningxia, in Yinchuan, Ningxia
