= Li Jingwen (economist) =

Chinese economist (1932–2021)

- 李京文
- Born: October 30, 1932; Luchuan County, Guangxi, China
- Died: March 31, 2021 (aged 88); Beijing, China
- Education: Wuhan University; Plekhanov Russian University of Economics
- Scientific career
- Fields: Economics
- Workplaces: School of Economics and Management, Beijing University of Technology

Li Jingwen (Chinese: 李京文; pinyin: Lǐ Jīngwén; October 30, 1932 – March 31, 2021) was a Chinese economist and management expert. He was an academician of the Chinese Academy of Engineering and the Chinese Academy of Social Sciences. He was a member of the 7th and 9th National Committee of the Chinese People's Political Consultative Conference. He was a delegate to the 8th National People's Congress.

== Biography ==
Li was born in Luchuan County, Guangxi, on October 30, 1932. In 1951, he was admitted to Wuhan University. In 1953, as the first group of students selected by new China to study in the Soviet Union, he was selected to study in the Soviet Union for five years and received a master's degree in economics from the Plekhanov Russian University of Economics. He returned to China in 1958 and that same year became a technician in Hebei Provincial Planning Commission. One year later, he was transferred to the State Planning Commission. In 1963, he participated in the preparation for the establishment of Beijing Institute of Economics and worked at the institute until 1971. He worked at the State Infrastructure Commission and Building Materials Industry Ministry from 1971 to 1985. In 1985, he was appointed director of the Institute of Quantitative Economy and Technical Economy, Chinese Academy of Social Sciences. In 1999, he became dean of the School of Economics and Management, Beijing University of Technology. On March 31, 2021, he died of illness in Beijing, aged 88.

== Honours and awards ==
- 1994 Foreign Fellow of the Russian Academy of Sciences
- 1998 Fellow of the International Eurasian Academy of Sciences
- 1999 Fellow of the World Academy of Productivity Science
- 2001 Member of the Chinese Academy of Engineering (CAE)
- 2006 Member of the Chinese Academy of Social Sciences (CASS)
