= Red Flag Lake (Zhenning County) =

- Red Flag Reservoir
- 红旗湖 (Chinese)
- Location in China.
- Location: Zhenning Buyei and Miao Autonomous County, Guizhou, China
- Coordinates: 26°04′49″N 105°46′35″E
- Type: Artificial lake
- Primary outflows: Zhenning River
- Basin countries: China
- Surface area: 5 square kilometres (1,200 acres)
- Max. depth: 10.8 m (35 ft)
- Water volume: 832,600 m^{3} (0.0001998 cu mi)

Red Flag Lake (simplified Chinese: 红旗湖; traditional Chinese: 紅旗湖; pinyin: Hóngqí Hú), also known as Red Flag Reservoir (红旗水库; 紅旗水庫; Hóngqí Shuǐkù), is an artificial lake in Zhenning Buyei and Miao Autonomous County, Guizhou, China. It covers a total surface area of 5 km^{2} (1.9 sq mi) and has a storage capacity of some 832,600 m^{3} (0.0001998 cu mi) of water. The lake discharges into the Zhenning River.

== Function ==
The lake provides drinking water and water for irrigation.

== Dam ==
The dam is 10.8 m (35 ft) high and made of stones.

== Picture ==
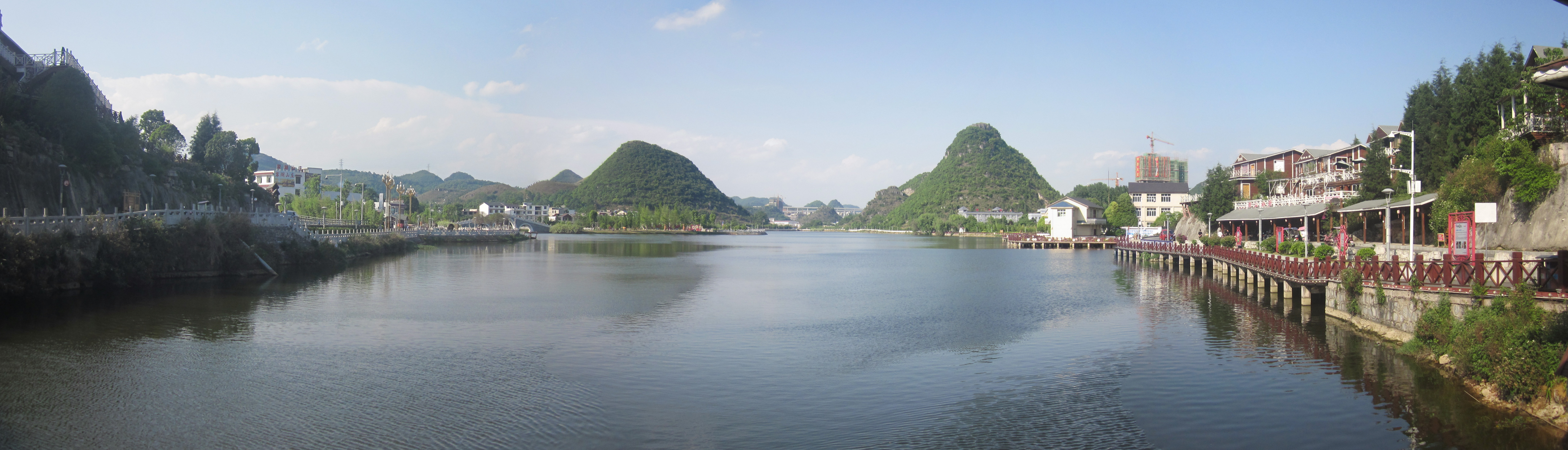
Red Flag Lake in 2020.
