= Guijiahu Reservoir =

- 桂家湖水库 (Chinese)
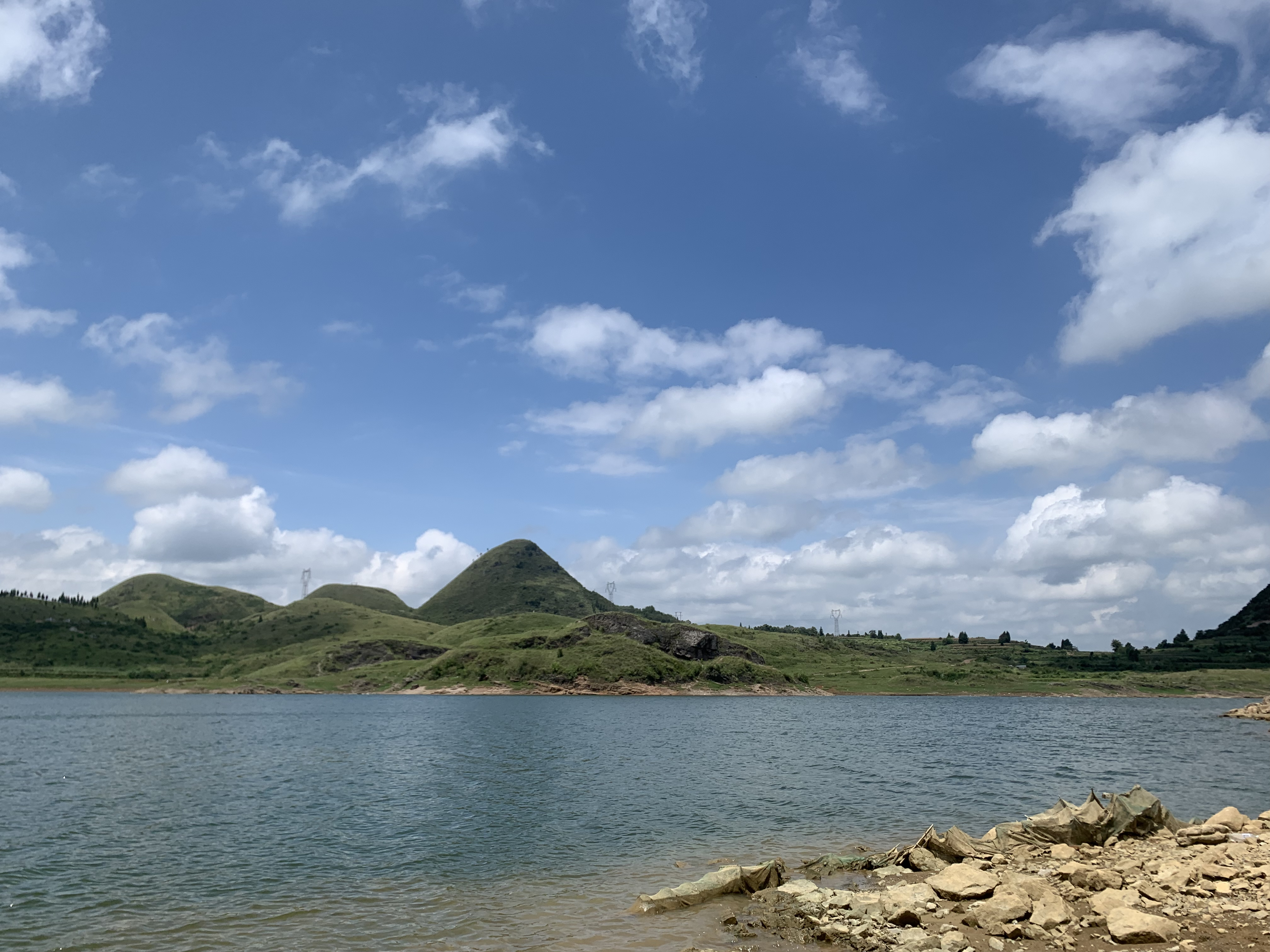
- Guijiahu Reservoir

- Location in China.
- Location: Zhenning Buyei and Miao Autonomous County, Guizhou, China
- Coordinates: 26°08′33″N 105°45′01″E
- Type: Reservoir
- Primary inflows: Dabang River
- Primary outflows: Dabang River
- Basin countries: China
- Built: 1958
- First flooded: 1966
- Surface area: 94.7 square kilometres (23,400 acres)
- Max. depth: 29 m (95 ft)
- Water volume: 17,400,000 m^{3} (0.0042 cu mi)

Guijiahu Reservoir (simplified Chinese: 桂家湖水库; traditional Chinese: 桂家湖水庫; pinyin: Guìjiāhú Shuǐkù) is a reservoir located in Zhenning Buyei and Miao Autonomous County, Guizhou, China. It covers a total surface area of 94.7 square kilometres (23,400 acres) and has a storage capacity of some 17,400,000 m^{3} (0.0042 cu mi) of water.

== Etymology ==
It is called Guijiahu Reservoir due to the dam is located in the Guijiabao Village of Guijia Township (桂家乡桂家堡村).

== History ==
Construction of the reservoir began in 1958 and were completed in 1966.

== Function ==
The reservoir provide water for irrigation, hydroelectric power and recreational activities.

== Dam ==
The dam is 29 m (95 ft) high, 445 m (1,460 ft) long, and 4 m (13 ft) thick, and was completed in 1998.
