= Jinfeng, Yinchuan =

Jinfeng 金凤区 ڭٍ‌فٍْ ٿِيُوِ
- District
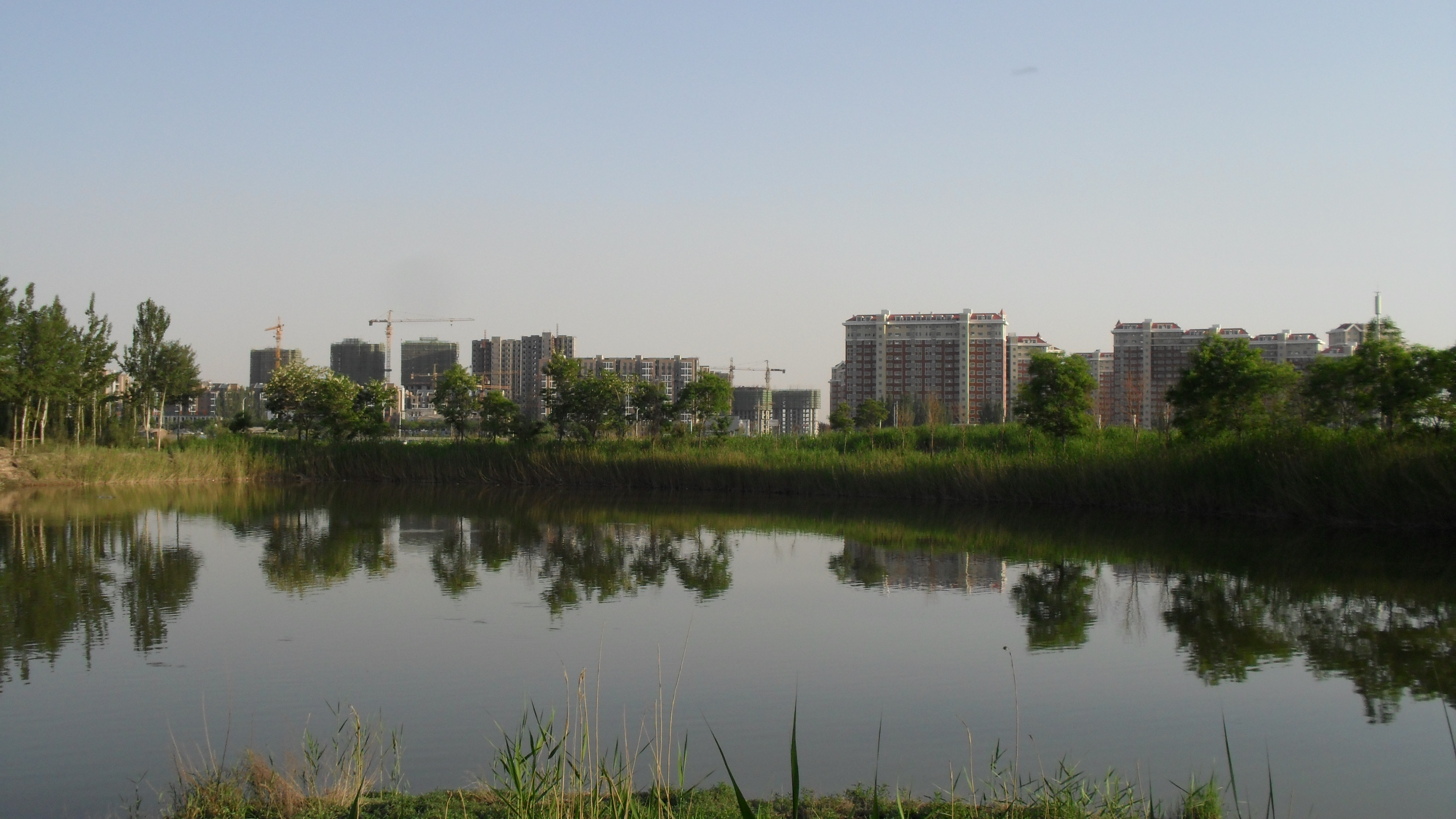

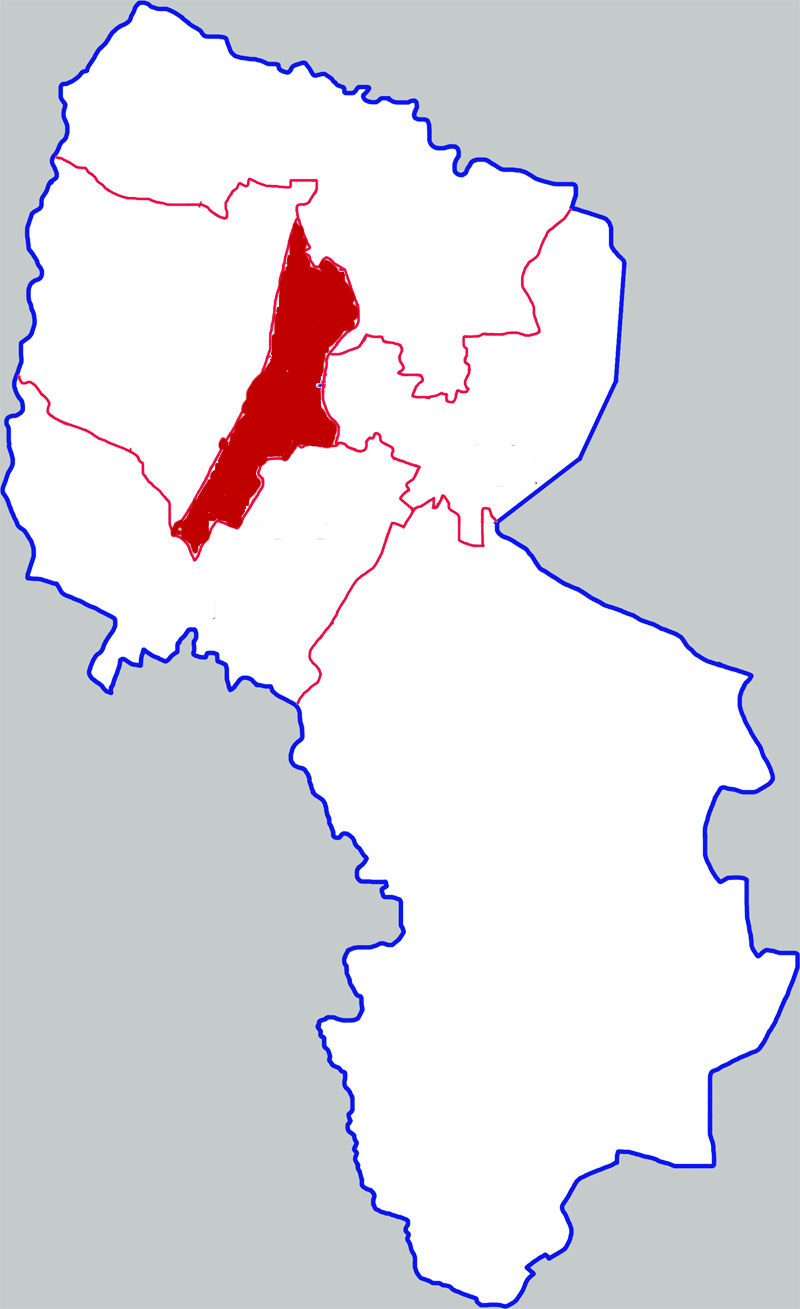
- Jinfeng in Yinchuan

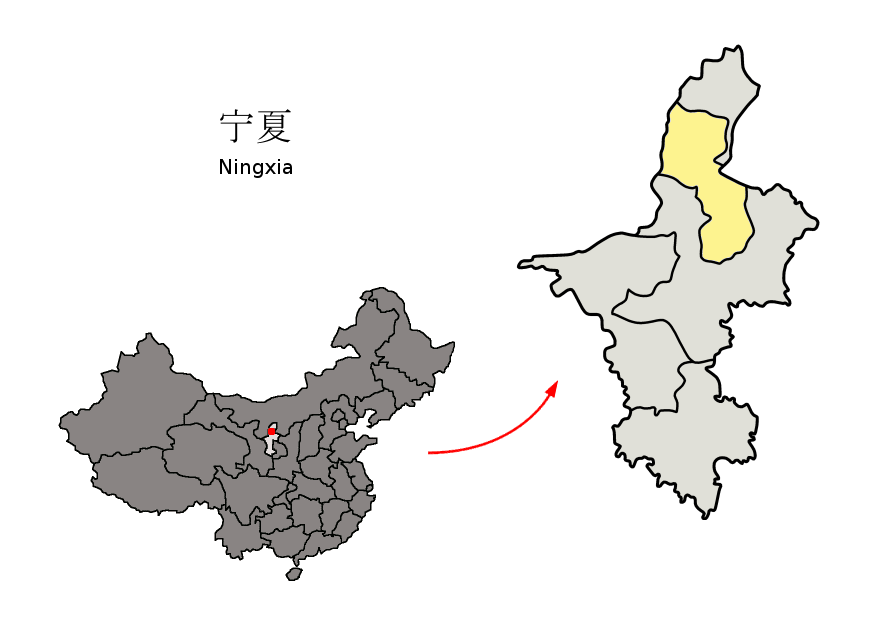
- Yinchuan in Ningxia
- Coordinates: 38°28′27″N 106°14′20″E
- Country: China
- Autonomous region: Ningxia
- Prefecture-level city: Yinchuan
- District seat: Beijingzhonglu Subdistrict

Area
  - Total: 270.27 km^{2} (104.35 sq mi)

Population
  - Total: 282,554
  - Density: 1,045.5/km^{2} (2,707.7/sq mi)
- Time zone: UTC+8 (China Standard)

Jinfeng District (simplified Chinese: 金凤区; traditional Chinese: 金鳳區; pinyin: Jīnfèng Qū; Wade–Giles: Chin-fêng Ch’ü; lit. 'golden phoenix') is one of three urban districts and the municipal seat of the prefecture-level city of Yinchuan, the capital of Ningxia Hui Autonomous Region, Northwest China. It has a total area of 290 km^{2} (110 sq mi), and, according to the 2010 China Census, a population of 282,554 people.

== Characteristics ==
Jinfeng District has developed industry in recent years. Industry in the district is divided into the New Material Industrial Park, the New High-Tech Industrial Park, the Specialized Medicine Industrial Park, and the Comprehensive Industrial Park. The district forms one of the cores of Yinchuan's industrial economy. The district government is located on East Xinxia Road, and the district's postal code is 750011. In 2006, Yinchuan's city-level government moved from Xingqing District to Jinfeng District, so Jinfeng District will become the administrative center of Yinchuan in the future.

== Administrative divisions ==
Jinfeng District has 5 subdistricts and 2 townships.

5 subdistricts

- Changchengzhonglu (长城中路街道, چَانْ‌چٍْ جْو لُ ڭِيَ‌دَوْ)
- Shanghaixilu (上海西路街道, شَانْ‌خَيْ ثِ لُ)
- Beijingzhonglu (北京中路街道, بِيْ‌ڭٍْ جْو لُ ڭِيَ‌دَوْ)
- Huanghe Donglu (黄河东路街道, خُوَانْ‌حَ دْو لُ ڭِيَ‌دَوْ)
- Mancheng Beijie (满城北街街道, مًاچٍْ بِيْ ڭِيَ‌ ڭِيَ‌دَوْ)

2 towns

- Fengdeng (丰登镇, فٍْ‌دٍْ جٍ)
- Liangtian (良田镇, لِيَانْ‌تِيًا جٍ)
