= Liangtian, Guangxi =

Liangtian 良田镇
- Town
- Location in Guangxi
- Coordinates: 22°2′52″N 110°13′24″E
- Country: People's Republic of China
- Autonomous region: Guangxi
- Prefecture-level city: Yulin
- County: Luchuan County
- Time zone: UTC+8 (China Standard)

Liangtian (Chinese: 良田; pinyin: Liángtián) is a town under the administration of Luchuan County, Guangxi, China. As of 2018, it has one residential community and 13 villages under its administration.
