= Lu Ruiguang =

Chinese revolutionary (1901–1937)

- 陆瑞光
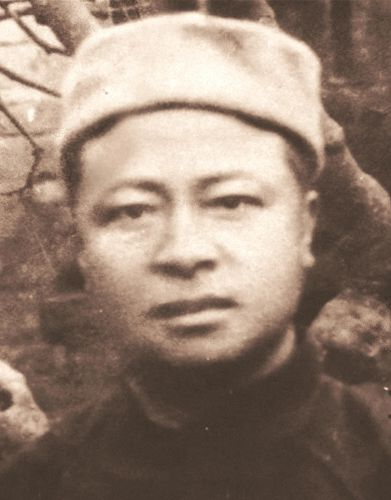
- Born: 1901; Zhenning County, Guizhou, Qing China
- Died: 1937 (aged 35–36); Guiyang, Guizhou, Republic of China
- Cause of death: Execution
- Occupation: Revolutionary

Lu Ruiguang (Chinese: 陆瑞光; pinyin: Lù Ruìguāng; 1901–1937) was a Chinese revolutionary of Bouyei ethnicity. He organized armed resistance against warlords in Guizhou in the 1920s and 1930s, and allied with the Chinese Red Army. Executed by Nationalist forces in 1937, he was posthumously recognized as a revolutionary martyr by the Guizhou Provincial Government in 1989.

== Early life ==
Lu Ruiguang was born in October 1901 in Huohongluogang village in Zhenning County, Guizhou. After his father, Lu Pinshan, moved the family to Nongran village in Zhenning County for better prospects, Lu studied at a private school and trained in martial arts under his elder brother. At 18, Lu married and joined his brother's and Wang Bizhen's armed resistance against taxation by warlords.

== Revolutionary career ==
Following the deaths of Lu's brother and Wang Bizhen at the hands of warlords, Lu inherited leadership of their militia. Initially, he paid off tax collectors to shield local farmers, but their relentless demands ignited his defiance. Uniting Bouyei, Miao and Han Chinese communities, Lu established a network of village checkpoints to repel warlord incursions. This earned him the loyalty of the locals, enabling rapid mobilization against the warloads.

In 1923, Lu led 500 fighters in a seven-day siege of Ziyun County, ousting warlord commander Wang Yuwen, whose troops had terrorized locals. In 1924, the Guizhou Security Corps, seeking to co-opt his influence, appointed him security battalion commander of Ziyun County. Lu exploited warlord rivalries to expand his forces, operating along the Guizhou-Guangxi border to seize weapons and supplies from passing warlord convoys.

In May 1929, Lu orchestrated a bold assault on Zhenning County with over thousand farmers. Posing as Nationalist troops, his forces stormed the county, expelled the county magistrate, and confiscated wealth from elites, redistributing food and goods to the impoverished. This act of defiance earned Lu the title of the foremost among Ziyun's "Four Heavenly Kings," creating a Robin Hood-style reputation alongside Lu Yunqi, Zeng Yunqing, and Wang Yuxuan, who are celebrated as folk heroes in present-day Guizhou. Lu's disciplined leadership set him apart: he enforced strict rules against harming civilians, punished violators harshly, and won the admiration of communities for his integrity. Warlord and leader of the Guizhou clique, Wang Jialie, alarmed by Lu's growing power, appointed him security commander while simultaneously backing rival Wang Zhongfang, a Bouyei leader, to sow discord and weaken both.

=== Alliance with the Red Army ===
In April 1935, as the Chinese Red Army traversed Guizhou during the Long March, the Third Army Corps, led by Peng Dehuai and Yang Shangkun, entered Zhenning. Informed of Lu's reputation, they sought his support to navigate the region's rugged terrain. Initially skeptical, fearing Nationalist propaganda about the Red Army, Lu hid in the mountains. However, the Red Army's conduct and outreach from Li Fuchun, the corps' political director, won his trust.

Hosting Peng, Yang, and Li at his home in Zhenning County, Lu shared the grievances of Bouyei and other minorities under warlord rule. Inspired by the Red Army's message for equality for miniority groups, he signed a historic agreement on 16 April 1935, pledging to oppose Nationalist leader Chiang Kai-shek. The Red Army gifted Lu a red flag, 36 rifles, machine guns, and grenades, leaving 12 wounded soldiers under his care, led by officer Fang Wuxian, to aid his resistance.

Guided by the Communist underground in Anshun, Lu and Fang established a revolutionary base across 48 villages in the Zhenning-Guanling-Ziyun border region, organizing guerrilla forces to challenge Nationalist control. In 1936, Lu and his forces attempted to join the Red Seventh Army in Guangxi's You River region but was repelled by Nationalist troops and retreated to Nongran.

=== Capture and execution ===
Lu's revolutionary activities drew the ire of the Nationalists. In December 1936, Sichuan warlord Yang Sen, commanding two divisions, launched a campaign to crush resistance in Zhenning and Ziyun. Using deception, Yang's forces lured Lu into a trap, capturing him, Lu Yunqi, Zeng Yunqing, and Wang Yuxuan on December 26. In a brutal reprisal, Yang's troops massacred over 100 villagers in Nongran, including Fang Wuxian and the remaining Red Army soldiers.

Paraded through Anshun and Guiyang, Lu and his comrades were subjected to public humiliation, their collarbones pierced with iron wires. In early 1937, Yang Sen ordered their execution in Guiyang. Lu, aged 36, and the three others were executed by firing squad. His family later retrieved his body, enduring a four-day journey to bury him in Nongran.

== Legacy ==
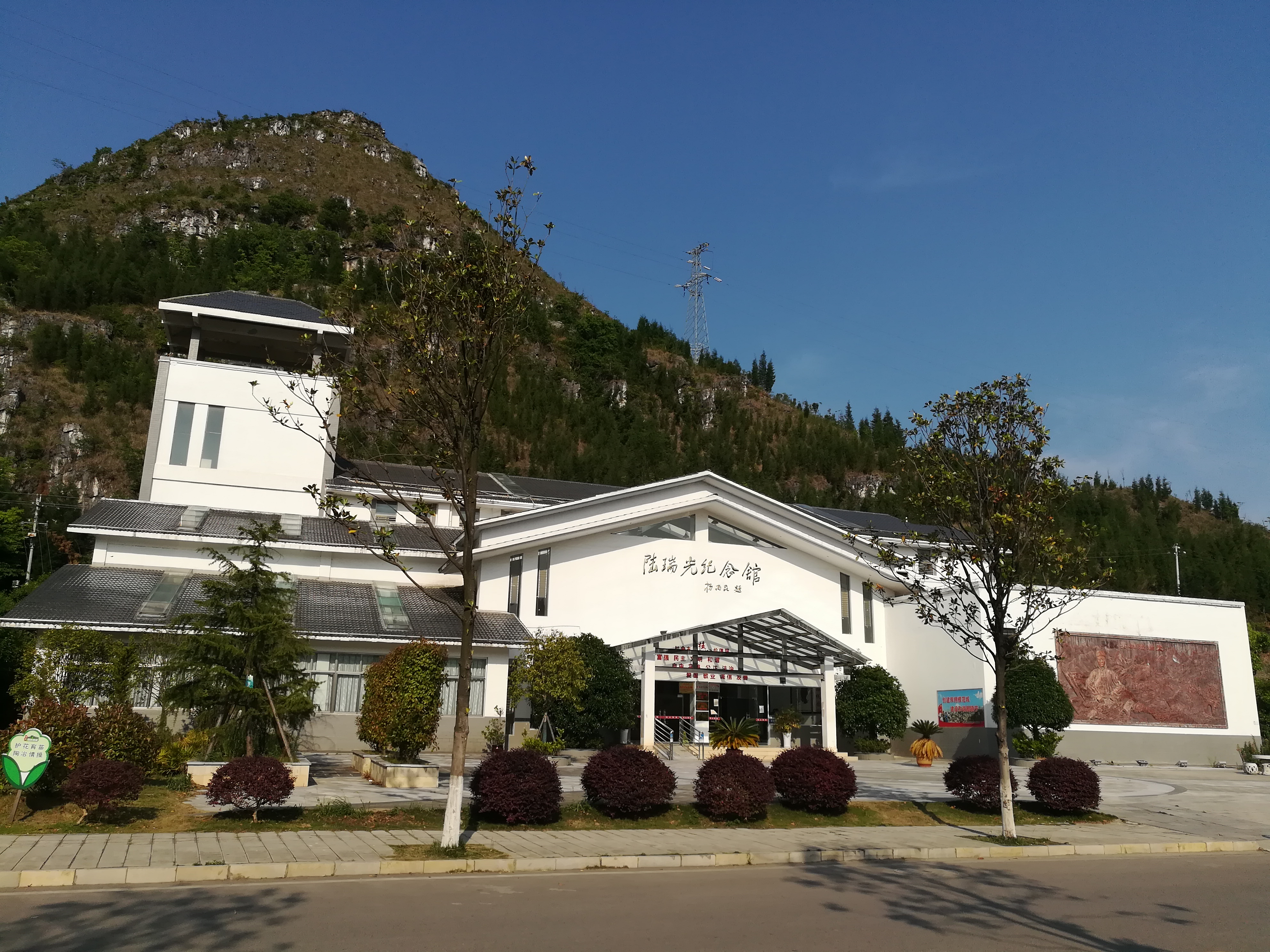
Lu Ruiguang Memorial Hall in Zhenning County, Guizhou

In 1989, the Guizhou Provincial Government posthumously declared Lu a revolutionary martyr.

On 29 June 2015, a memorial hall honoring Lu was opened in Zhenning County. On 31 July 2018, Lu's grave at Nongran village in Zhenning County was listed among the sixth batch of provincial cultural relics protection site by the Guizhou Provincial Government.
