= Fengdeng =

Fengdeng 丰登镇 فٍْ‌دٍْ جٍ
- Town
- Location in Ningxia
- Coordinates: 38°33′5″N 106°14′47″E
- Country: People's Republic of China
- Autonomous region: Ningxia
- Prefecture-level city: Yinchuan
- District: Jinfeng District
- Time zone: UTC+8 (China Standard)

Fengdeng (simplified Chinese: 丰登; traditional Chinese: 豐登; pinyin: Fēngdēng, Xiao'erjing: فٍْ‌دٍْ جٍ) is a town under the administration of Jinfeng District, Yinchuan, Ningxia, China. As of 2018, it has 8 villages under its administration.
