= Zhenning Buyei and Miao Autonomous County =

Zhenning County 镇宁县 · Zenqninf xianq
- Autonomous county
- 镇宁布依族苗族自治县; Zenqninf Buxqyaix Buxyeeuz Ziqziqxianq; Zhenning Buyei and Miao Autonomous County
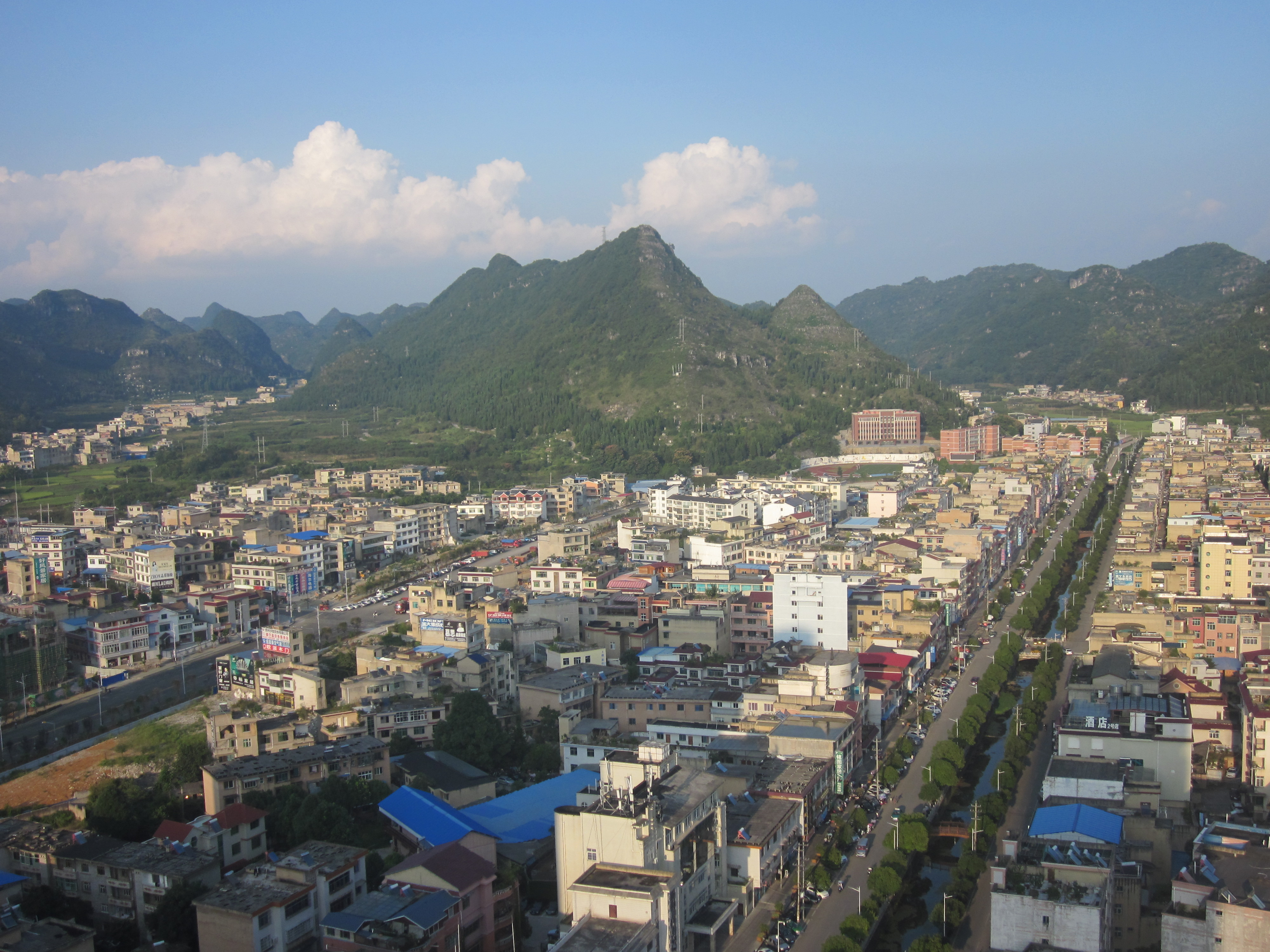

- Location of the seat in Guizhou Zhenning (Southwest China)
- Coordinates (Zhenning County government): 26°03′29″N 105°46′13″E
- Country: China
- Province: Guizhou
- Prefecture-level city: Anshun
- County seat: Huancui Subdistrict

Area
  - Total: 1,709.42 km^{2} (660.01 sq mi)

Population (2020 census)
  - Total: 299,696
  - Density: 175.320/km^{2} (454.077/sq mi)
- Time zone: UTC+8 (CST)
- Website: www.gzzn.gov.cn

Zhenning Buyei and Miao Autonomous County (Chinese: 镇宁布依族苗族自治县; pinyin: Zhènníng Bùyīzú Miáozú Zìzhìxiàn; usually referred to as "Zhenning County", commonly abbreviated as Zhenning (镇宁县; Zhènníng Xiàn); Bouyei: Zenqninf Buxqyaix Buxyeeuz Ziqziqxianq) is an autonomous county under the administration of the prefecture-level city of Anshun, in the southwest of Guizhou Province, China.

== History ==
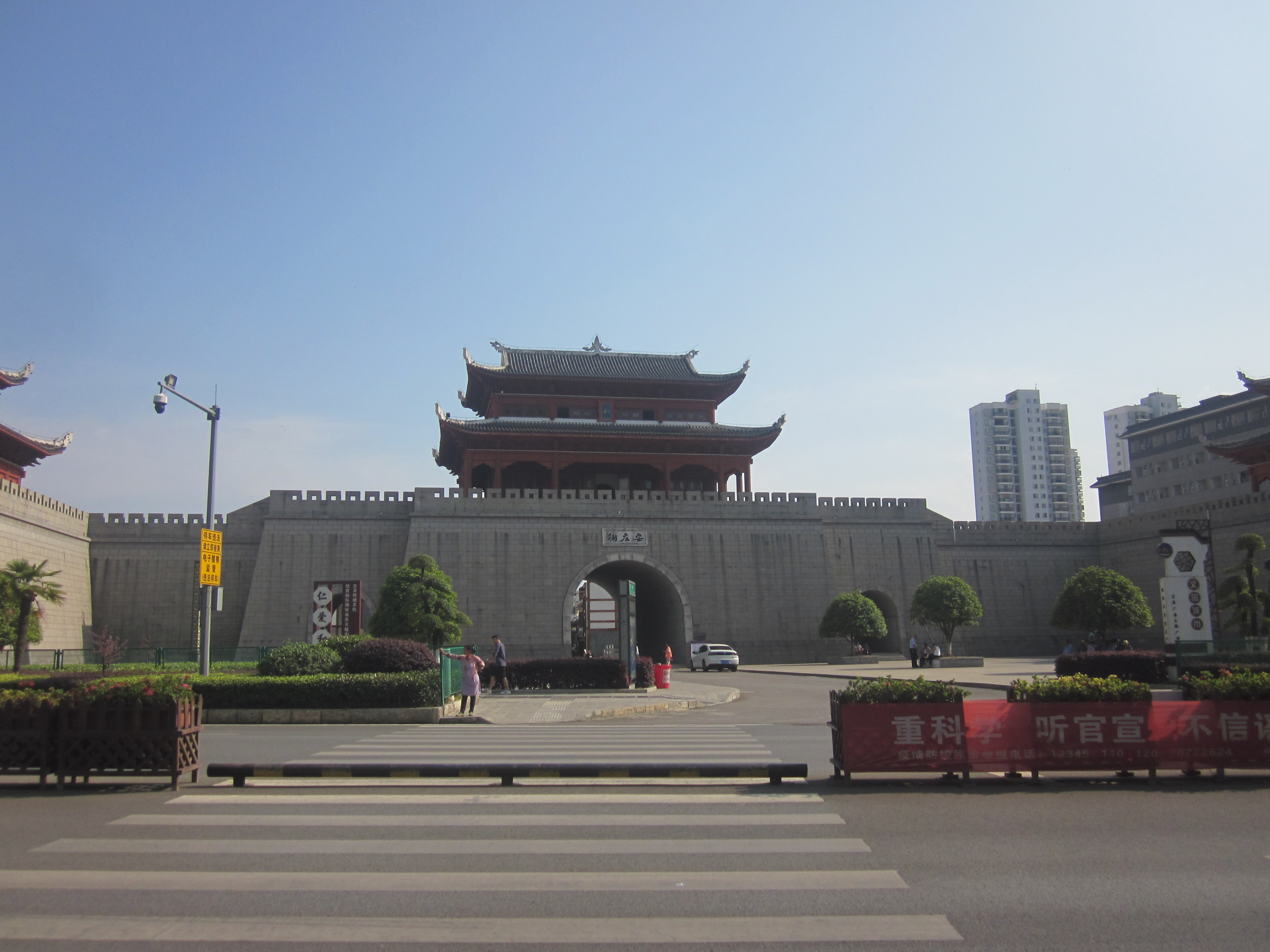
"Anzhuangwei" (reconstruction).

In the 3rd century BC, Zhenning Buyei and Miao Autonomous County (Zhenning) was a part of an ancient political entity Yelang.

In 233, in the 11th year of Jianxing period of Shu Han (221–263), the county under the control of Puli Dazong (普里大宗).

In late Song dynasty, the powerful Mongol Empire, led by Genghis Khan, began their conquest of Song Empire. The Mongolian army occupied Zhenning and it came under the jurisdiction of Hehong Zhou (和宏州). In 1351, in the 11th year of Zhizheng period of the Yuan dynasty (1271–1368), Hehong Prefecture was renamed "Zhenning Zhou" (镇宁州) and belonged to Puding Circuit (普定路).

In 1385, in the ruling of Hongwu Emperor of the Ming dynasty (1368–1644), Zhenning came under the jurisdiction of Sichuan Buzhengshisi (四川布政使司). Five years later, a military garrison named "Anzhuangwei" (安庄卫) was founded in downtown Zhenning.

In 1671, in the reign of Kangxi Emperor of the Qing dynasty (1644–1911), Zhenning became an independent "Zhou" and under the administration of Anshun Prefecture (安顺府).

In 1914, Zhenning Zhou was revoked and Zhenning County was set up.

On November 21, 1949, the Communists took over Zhenning. In 1956, it came under the jurisdiction of Qiannan Buyei and Miao Autonomous Prefecture. In 1958, Guanling was briefly merged into Zhenning County and then separated in 1961. On September 11, 1963, it became an autonomous county approved by the State Council of China. In 1964, it was under jurisdiction of Liuzhi Special District. In 1981, Zhenning Buyei and Miao Autonomous County came under the jurisdiction of Anshun.

== Administrative divisions ==
Zhenning is divided into 5 subdistricts, 8 towns and 1 township:

- Baimahu Subdistrict (白马湖街道)
- Huancui Subdistrict (环翠街道)
- Shuanglongshan Subdistrict (双龙山街道)
- Dingqi Subdistrict (丁旗街道)
- Ningxi Subdistrict (宁西街道)
- Huangguoshu Town (黄果树镇)
- Jianglong Town (江龙镇)
- Machang Town (马厂镇)
- Liangtian Town (良田镇)
- Biandanshan Town (扁担山镇)
- Muyi Town (募役镇)
- Benzhai Town (本寨镇)
- Liuma Town (六马镇)
- Shazi Township (沙子乡)
- Geli Township (革利乡)
- Jianga Township (简嘎乡)
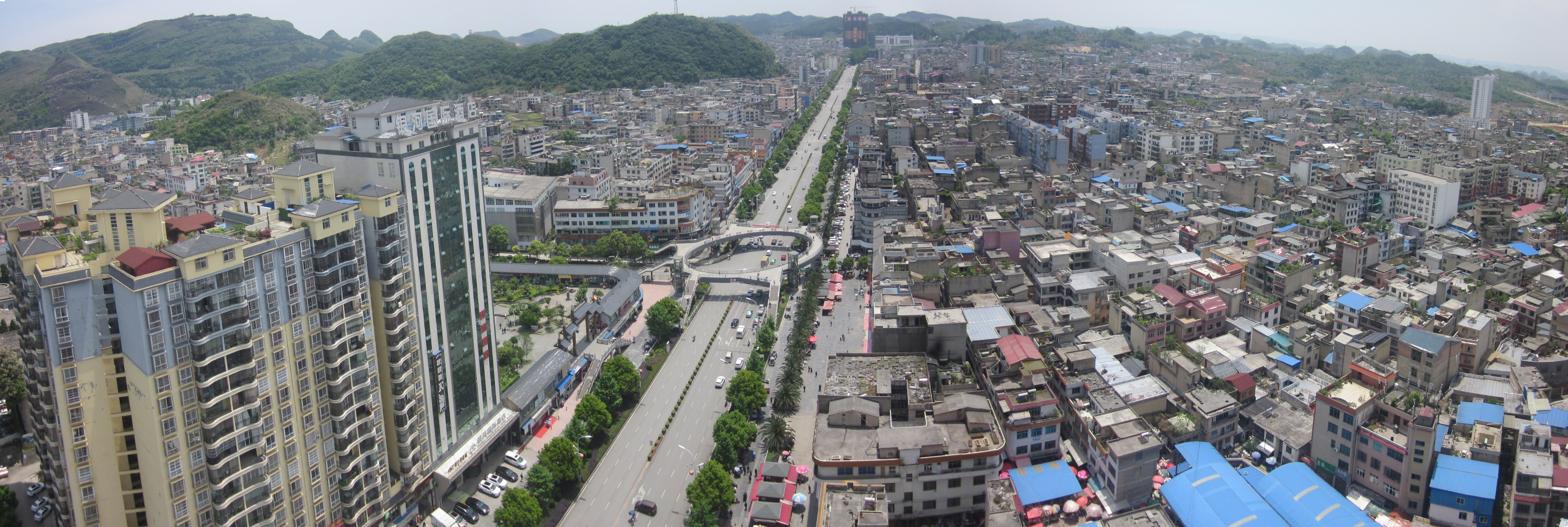
A panoramic view of Zhenning Buyei and Miao Autonomous County in 2020.
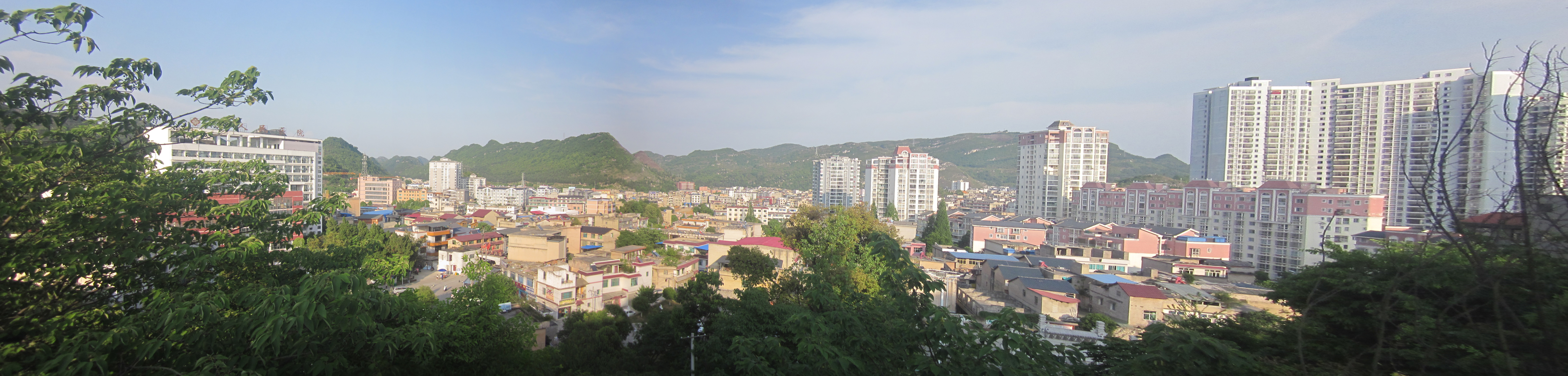
View of Zhenning Buyei and Miao Autonomous County from Mount Zhouwu in 2020.

== Geography ==
Zhenning Buyei and Miao Autonomous County is located in the southwest of Guizhou province. The county has a total area of 1,079.42 km^{2} (416.77 sq mi). It borders Puding County and Liuzhi Special District in the north, Wangmo County and Zhenfeng County in the east and south, Xixiu District and Ziyun Miao and Buyei Autonomous County in the east, and Guanling Buyei and Miao Autonomous County in the west.

=== Climate ===
Zhenning Buyei and Miao Autonomous County is in the subtropical humid monsoon climate zone, with an average annual temperature of 16.2 °C (61.2 °F), total annual rainfall of 1,277-millimetre (50.3 in), a frost-free period of 279 to 345 days and annual average sunshine hours in 1142 hours. The highest temperature is 23.7 °C (74.7 °F), and the lowest temperature is 6.5 °C (43.7 °F).

Climate data for Zhenning, elevation 1,251 m (4,104 ft), (1991–2020 normals, extremes 1981–2010)
Month	Jan	Feb	Mar	Apr	May	Jun	Jul	Aug	Sep	Oct	Nov	Dec	Year
Record high °C (°F)	23.8 (74.8)	30.2 (86.4)	33.2 (91.8)	33.3 (91.9)	34.5 (94.1)	32.6 (90.7)	33.0 (91.4)	33.8 (92.8)	32.9 (91.2)	29.0 (84.2)	26.0 (78.8)	22.9 (73.2)	34.5 (94.1)
Mean daily maximum °C (°F)	9.5 (49.1)	12.8 (55.0)	17.6 (63.7)	22.3 (72.1)	24.8 (76.6)	25.6 (78.1)	27.3 (81.1)	27.7 (81.9)	24.5 (76.1)	20.1 (68.2)	16.4 (61.5)	10.4 (50.7)	19.9 (67.8)
Daily mean °C (°F)	6.2 (43.2)	8.5 (47.3)	12.7 (54.9)	17.1 (62.8)	20.2 (68.4)	21.7 (71.1)	23.1 (73.6)	22.7 (72.9)	20.3 (68.5)	16.3 (61.3)	12.6 (54.7)	7.0 (44.6)	15.7 (60.3)
Mean daily minimum °C (°F)	4.0 (39.2)	5.6 (42.1)	9.5 (49.1)	13.5 (56.3)	16.8 (62.2)	19.0 (66.2)	20.1 (68.2)	19.3 (66.7)	17.6 (63.7)	13.7 (56.7)	10.1 (50.2)	4.7 (40.5)	12.8 (55.1)
Record low °C (°F)	−4.8 (23.4)	−3.0 (26.6)	−2.8 (27.0)	3.1 (37.6)	7.4 (45.3)	11.8 (53.2)	11.7 (53.1)	12.2 (54.0)	9.0 (48.2)	3.6 (38.5)	−0.7 (30.7)	−7.0 (19.4)	−7.0 (19.4)
Average precipitation mm (inches)	23.5 (0.93)	17.8 (0.70)	35.3 (1.39)	71.2 (2.80)	178.4 (7.02)	338.2 (13.31)	261.6 (10.30)	168.3 (6.63)	120.8 (4.76)	99.0 (3.90)	33.4 (1.31)	16.6 (0.65)	1,364.1 (53.7)
Average precipitation days (≥ 0.1 mm)	14.2	11.4	13.2	13.8	16.9	18.3	18.0	15.6	12.0	15.6	10.6	11.8	171.4
Average snowy days	3.1	1.2	0.2	0	0	0	0	0	0	0	0.1	0.9	5.5
Average relative humidity (%)	82	78	75	73	75	81	82	80	78	81	79	79	79
Mean monthly sunshine hours	45.2	66.3	93.7	128.5	131.2	101.5	145.0	159.6	124.0	80.2	89.0	58.7	1,222.9
Percentage possible sunshine	14	21	25	33	31	25	35	40	34	23	28	18	27
Source: China Meteorological Administration

=== Rivers ===
There are 31 rivers and streams in Zhenning Buyei and Miao Autonomous County, which are tributaries of Dabang River and Qingshui River.

Zhenning River flows through the downtown county.

=== Lakes and reservoirs ===
There are three reservoirs in Zhenning Buyei and Miao Autonomous County: Wang'er River Reservoir (王二河水库), White Horse Reservoir (白马水库), Guijiahu Reservoir and Red Flag Lake.

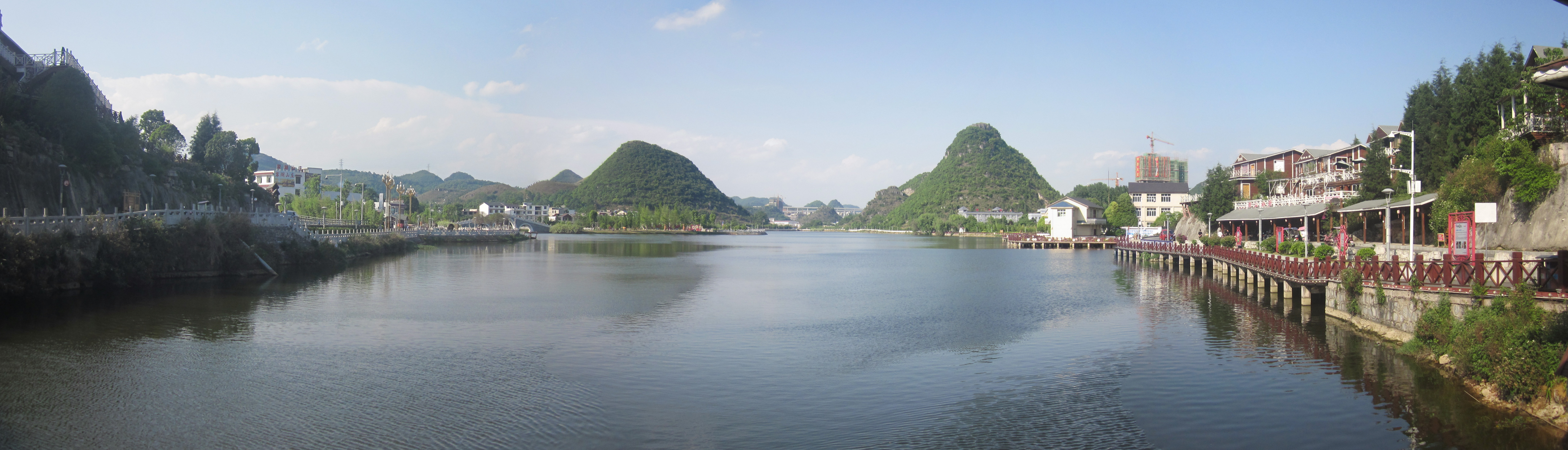
Red Flag Lake.

=== Mountains ===
The highest point in Zhenning Buyei and Miao Autonomous County is Maocaopo (茅草坡; 'Thatched Slope') which stands 1,678 metres (5,505 ft) above sea level. The lowest point is in Liangtian, which, at 356 metres (1,168 ft) above sea level.

=== Parks ===
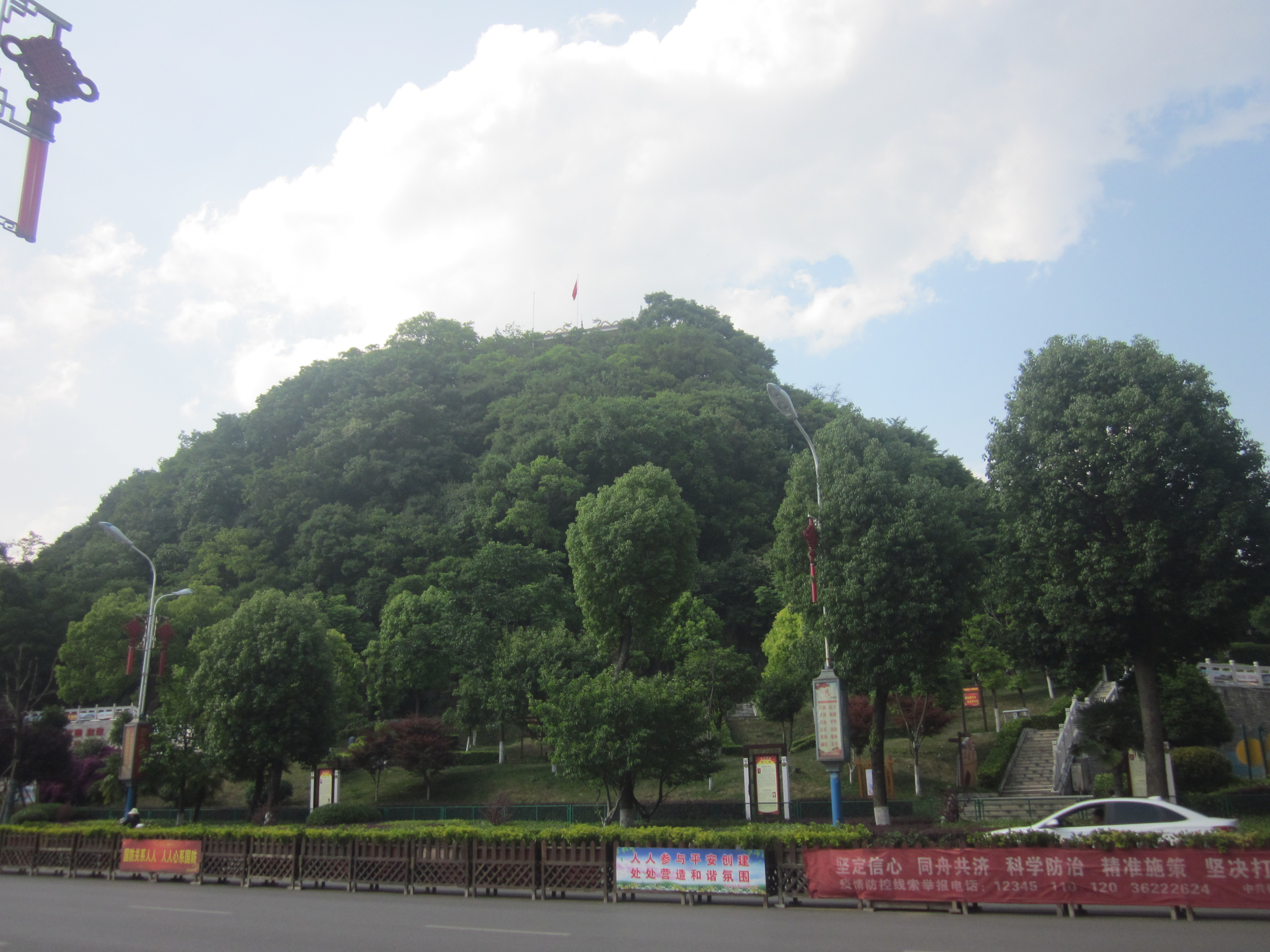
Huancui Park.

Huancui Park (环翠公园) is an urban park in Zhenning Buyei and Miao Autonomous County.

== Economy ==
As of 2019, the GDP of Zhenning Buyei and Miao Autonomous County was 10.962 billion yuan, and the per capita GDP was 38162 yuan. Zhenning Buyei and Miao Autonomous County's economic engines are agriculture, animal husbandry, mining, paper industry, tourism, and plastic products industry.

== Demographics ==
=== Population ===
As of 2019, the National Bureau of Statistics of the People's Republic of China estimates the county's population now to be 287,300. There are 23 ethnic groups living in Zhenning Buyei and Miao Autonomous County, including Han, Buyei, Miao and Gelao.

=== Language ===
Mandarin is the official language. The local people speak both Southwestern Mandarin and minority language.

=== Religion ===
The county government supports all religions. The local people mainly believe in Buddhism and Catholicism.

== Education ==
There are one high school, nine middle schools, sixty-nine primary schools, and sixty-four kindergartens in Zhenning Buyei and Miao Autonomous County.

== Transportation ==
China National Highway 320, commonly abbreviated as "National Highway 320", runs through the county.

The G60 Shanghai–Kunming Expressway, commonly referred to as "Hukun Expressway", is a major northeast–southwest interstate that runs through western Zhenning Buyei and Miao Autonomous County and intersects with Duxiang Expressway in Yanpo, just north of the county.

Zhensheng Expressway

== Tourism ==
Tourism and related services are still developing in Zhenning Buyei and Miao Autonomous County. The county is known worldwide for Huangguoshu Waterfall, which attracts a large number of tourists. The county's most visited Buddhist temple is Nianfo Temple (念佛寺). The Red Flag Reservoir is a popular attraction. Major tourist destinations include Yelang Cave (夜郎洞), Rhinoceros Cave (犀牛洞) and Shuangming Cave (双明洞).

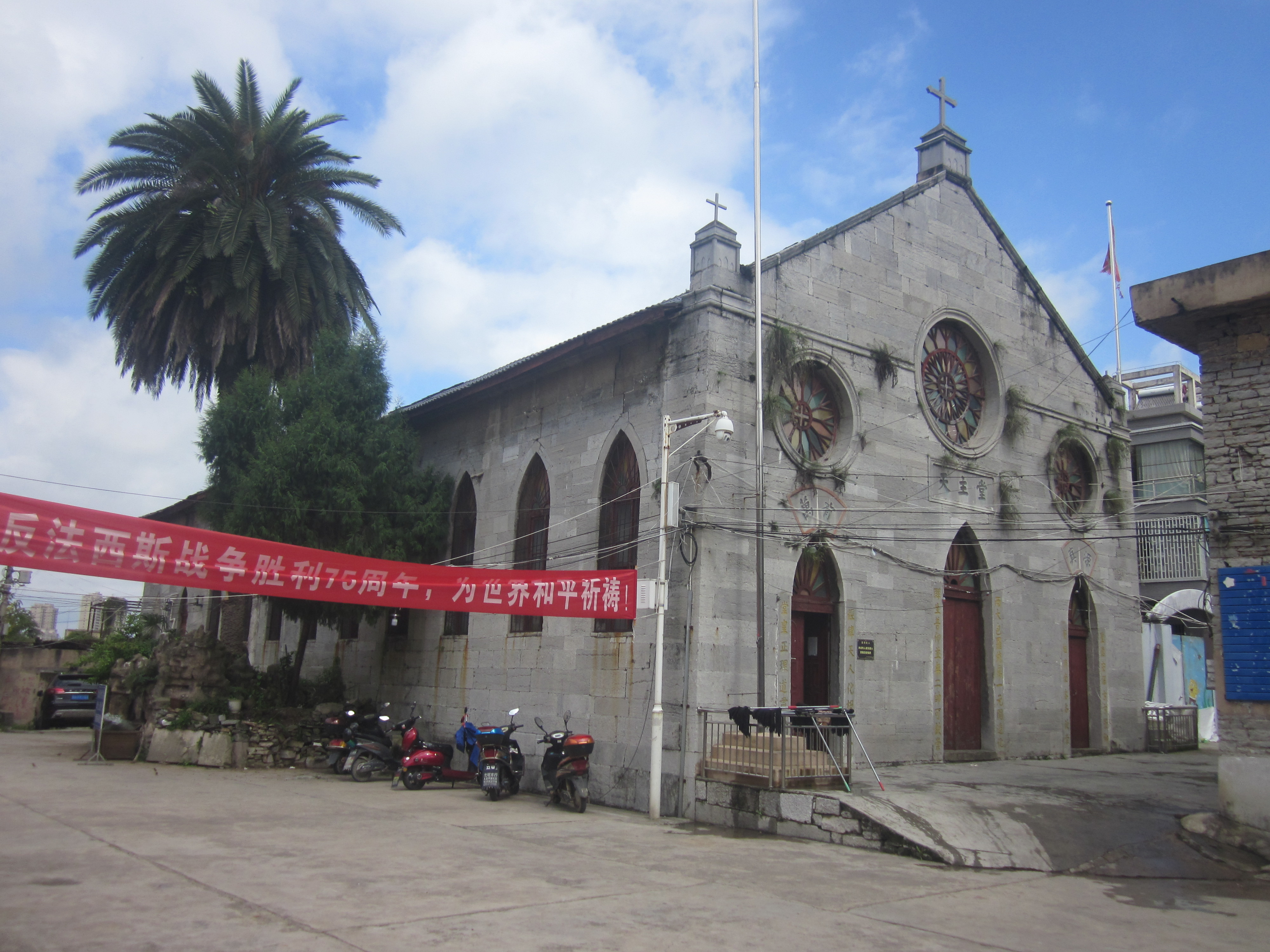
Zhenning Catholic Church.

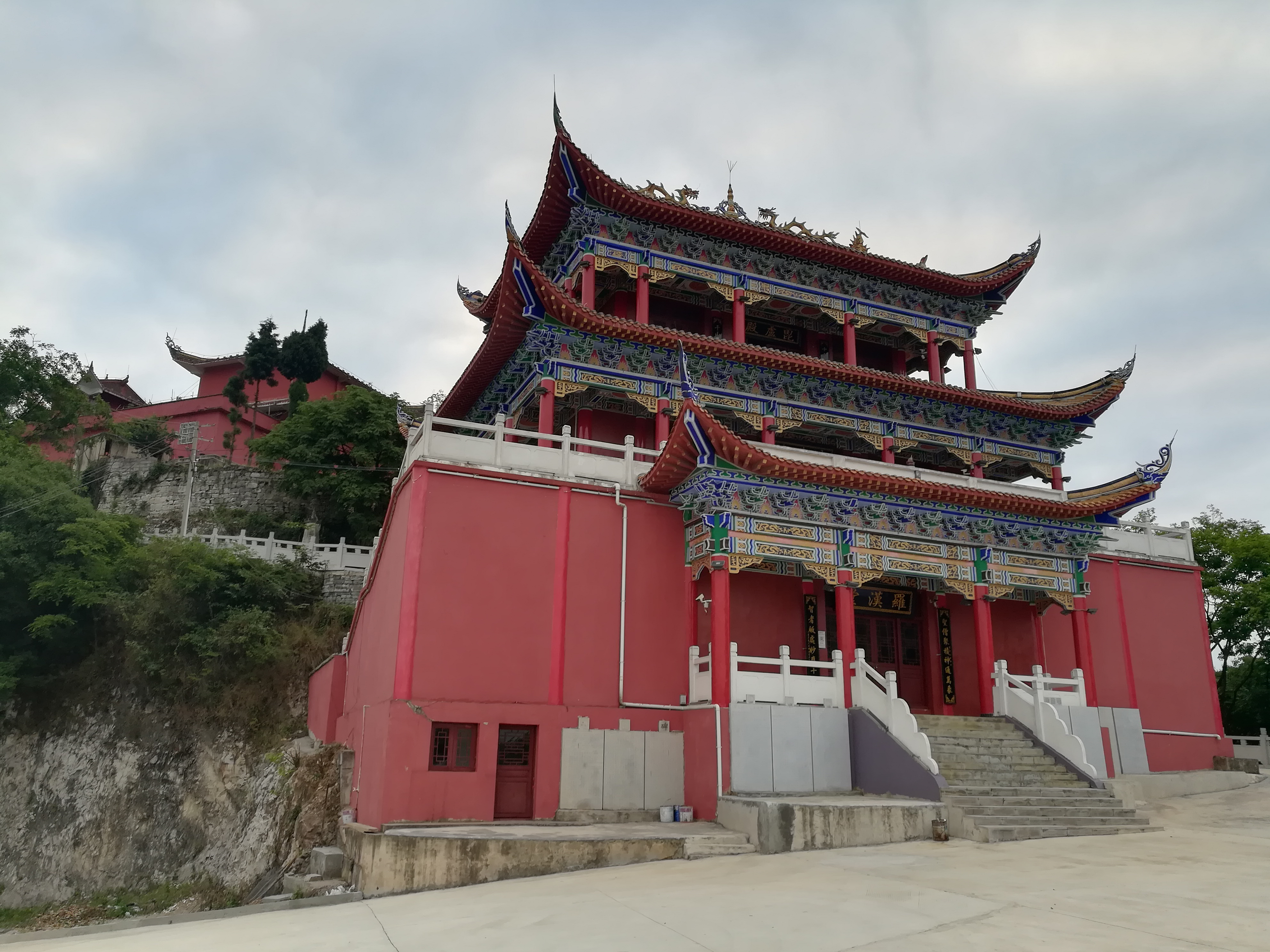
Arhat Hall, Nianfo Temple.

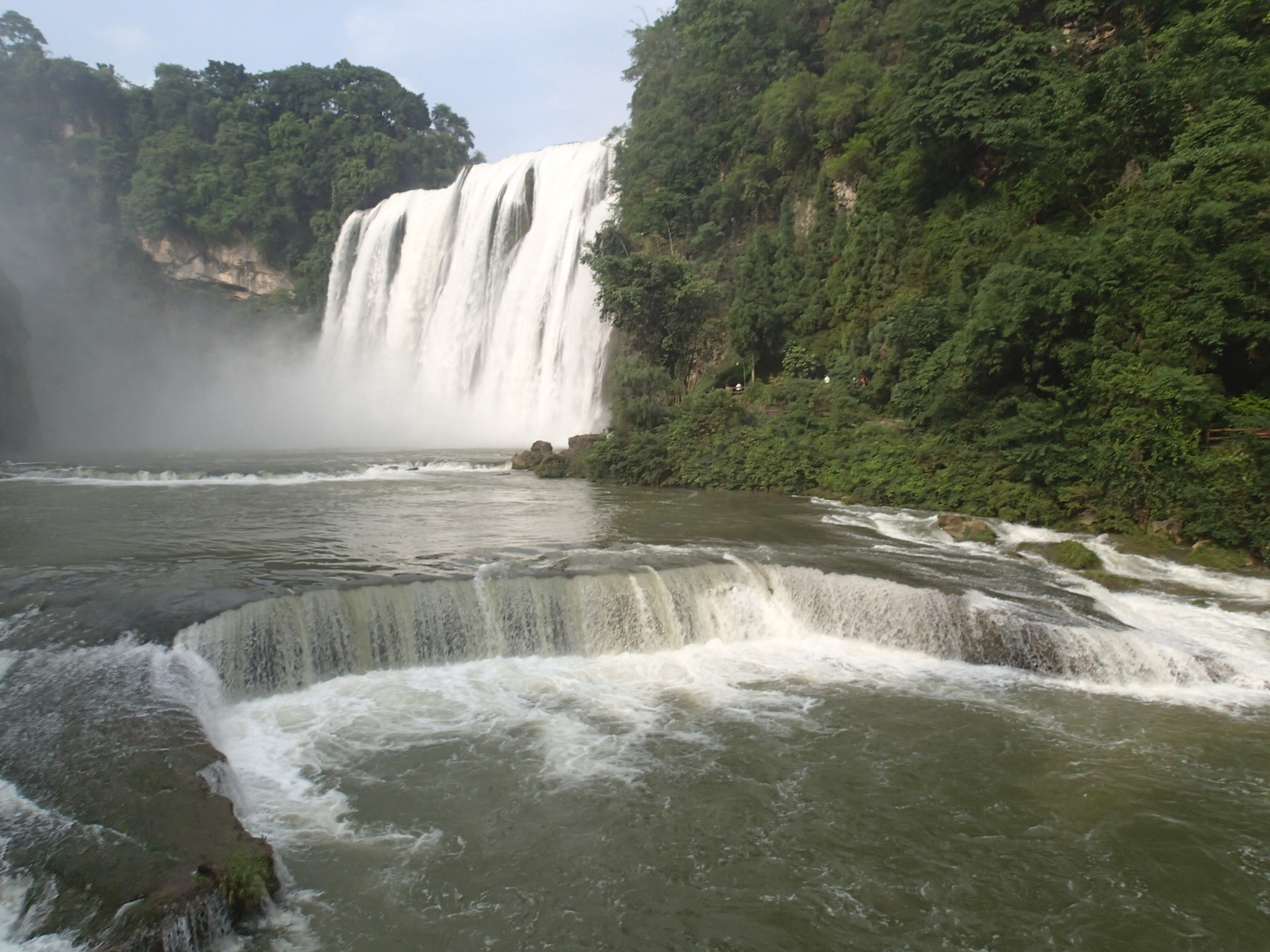
Huangguoshu Waterfall.

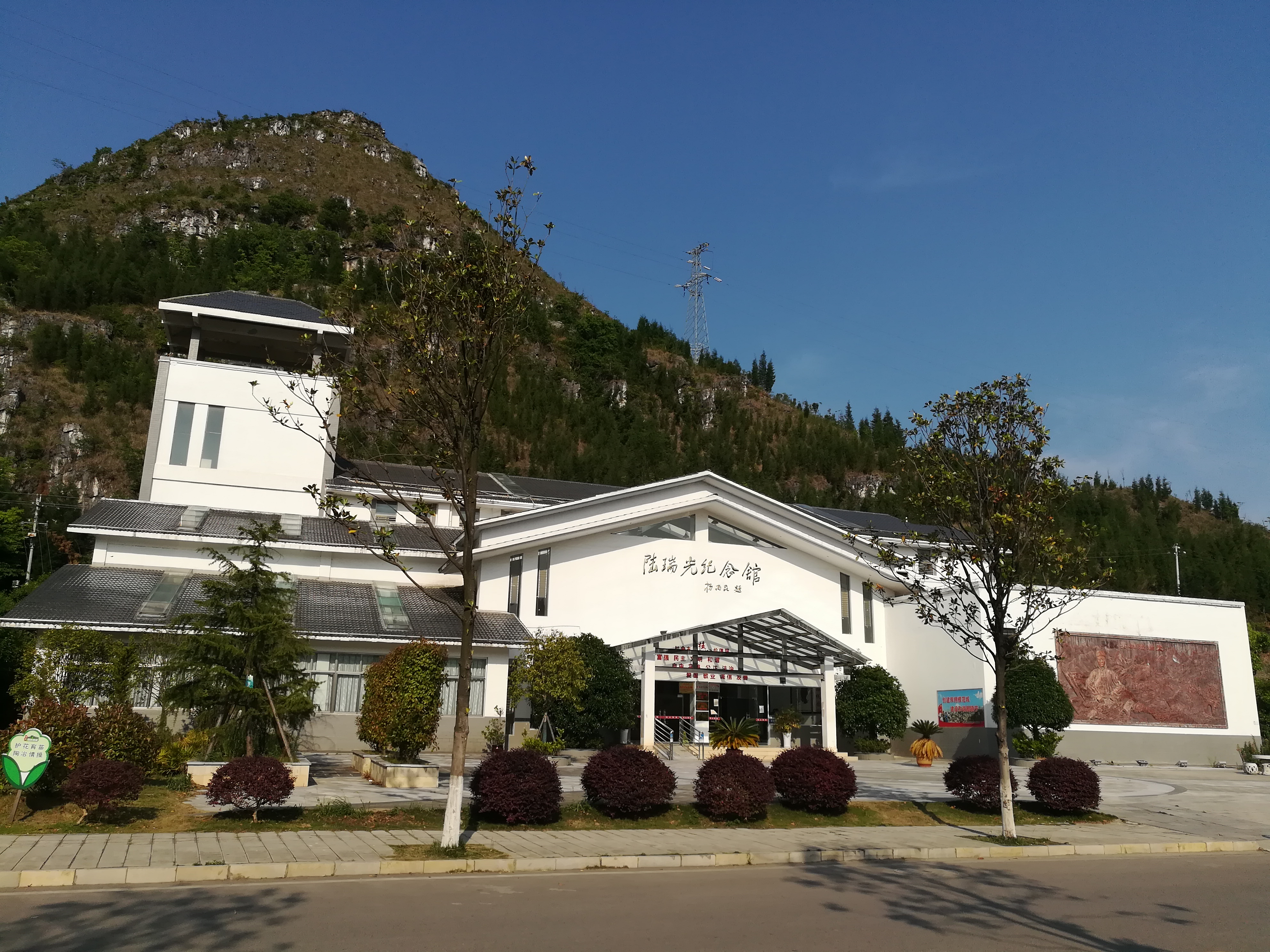
Lu Ruiguang Memorial Museum.

== Notable people ==
- Lu Ruiguang, revolutionary
- Ren Zhengfei, entrepreneur, engineer and founder and CEO of Huawei Technologies Co., Ltd.
