= Dabang River =

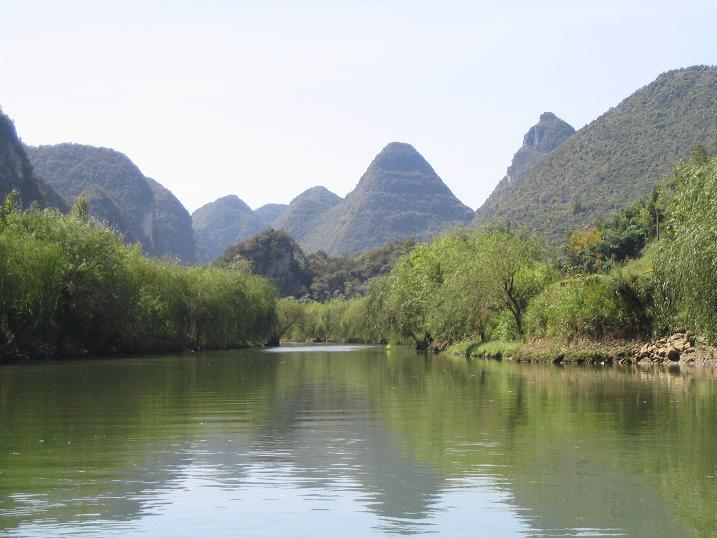
- Long gong in Anshun

Location
- Country: People's Republic of China

Physical characteristics
- Source
  - location: Xixiu District, Anshun, Guizhou Province
- Mouth: Beipan River
  - location: Fujiazhai, Guanling Buyei and Miao Autonomous County, Guizhou Province
  - coordinates: 25°34′04″N 105°44′57″E
- Length: 132 km (82 mi)
- Basin size: 2,864 km^{2} (1,106 sq mi)
- Discharge
  - average: 48.1 m^{3}/s (1,700 cu ft/s)

The Dabang River (Chinese: 打邦河; pinyin: Dǎbāng Hé) is a river in Guizhou Province, China. It rises in Tamu Mountain of northeastern Anshun and flows southward to join the Beipan River just south of Fujiazhai in Guanling Buyei and Miao Autonomous County. The river has a length of 132 km and drains an area of 2,864 square km.
