= Zhenning River =

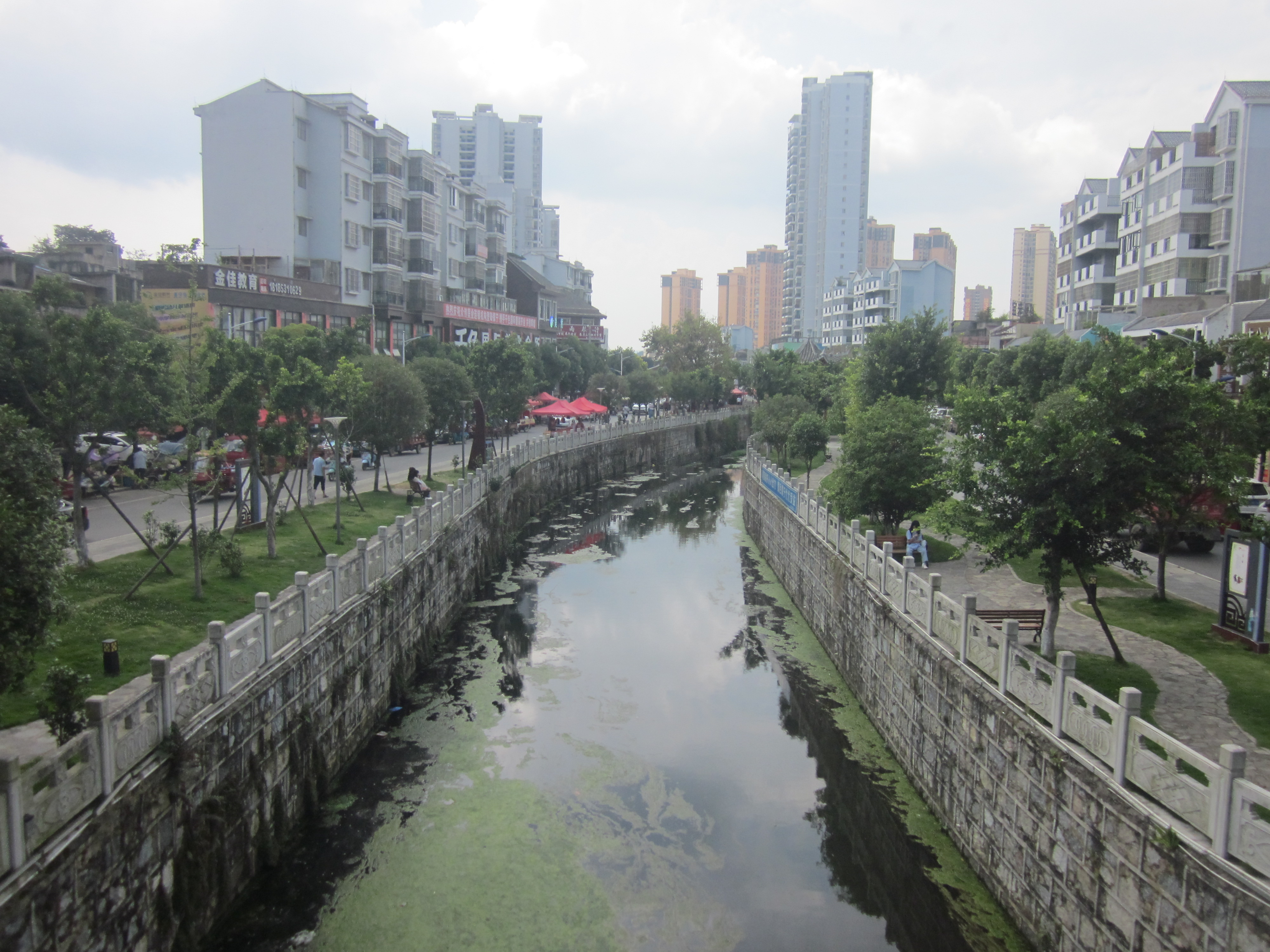
- Zhenning River in August 2020.
- Native name: 镇宁河 (Chinese)

Location
- Country: China
- Province: Guizhou

Physical characteristics
- Source
  - location: Boluo Village, Shuanglongshan Subdistrict
- Mouth: Guijia River
  - location: Guozhai Village, Huancui Subdistrict
- Length: 14.05 km (8.73 mi)

Basin features
- Waterbodies: Huangguoshu Reservoir

Zhenning River (simplified Chinese: 镇宁河; traditional Chinese: 鎮寧河; pinyin: Zhènníng Hé) is a 14.05-kilometre-long (8.73 mi) river in downtown Zhenning Buyei and Miao Autonomous County and is a tributary of Guijia River (桂家河). The river rises in Boluo Village (簸箩村) of Shuanglongshan Subdistrict, and flows generally west through Shuanglong Subdistrict, Baimahu Subdistrict and Huancui Subdistrict, where it flows into the Guijia River in Guozhai Village (果寨村).
