= Liangtian Township =

Liangtian Township 良田乡
- Township
- Location in Guangdong
- Coordinates: 23°33′7″N 115°50′36″E
- Country: People's Republic of China
- Province: Guangdong
- Prefecture-level city: Jieyang
- County: Jiexi County
- Time zone: UTC+8 (China Standard)

Liangtian Township (simplified Chinese: 良田乡; traditional Chinese: 良田鄉; pinyin: Liángtián Xiāng) is a township under the administration of Jiexi County, Guangdong, China. As of 2018, it has one residential community and 10 villages under its administration.
