= Liangtian, Ningxia =

Liangtian 良田镇 لِيَانْ‌تِيًا جٍ
- Town
- Location in Ningxia
- Coordinates: 38°27′46″N 106°12′16″E
- Country: People's Republic of China
- Autonomous region: Ningxia
- Prefecture-level city: Yinchuan
- District: Jinfeng District
- Time zone: UTC+8 (China Standard)

Liangtian (Chinese: 良田; pinyin: Liángtián, Xiao'erjing: لِيَانْ‌تِيًا جٍ) is a town under the administration of Jinfeng District, Yinchuan, Ningxia, China. As of 2018, it has one residential community and 8 villages under its administration.
