= Liangtian, Guizhou =

Liangtian 良田镇
- Town
- Location in China
- Coordinates: 25°35′25″N 105°48′21″E
- Country: People's Republic of China
- Province: Guizhou
- Prefecture-level city: Anshun
- Autonomous county: Zhenning Buyei and Miao Autonomous County
- Time zone: UTC+8 (China Standard)

Liangtian (simplified Chinese: 良田镇; traditional Chinese: 良田鎮; pinyin: Liángtián Zhèn) is a town under the administration of Zhenning Buyei and Miao Autonomous County, Guizhou, China. As of 2018, it has two residential communities and 12 villages under its administration.

== See also ==
- List of township-level divisions of Guizhou
