= Luchuan County =

County in Guangxi, China

Luchuan County 陆川县 • Luzconh Hen Luchwan
- County
- Location of the seat in Guangxi
- Coordinates: 22°21′N 110°15′E
- Country: China
- Province: Guangxi
- Prefecture-level city: Yulin
- County seat: Wenquan

Area
  - Total: 1,551 km^{2} (599 sq mi)

Population (2020)
  - Total: 804,427
  - Density: 518.7/km^{2} (1,343/sq mi)
- Time zone: UTC+8 (China Standard)

Luchuan County (simplified Chinese: 陆川县; traditional Chinese: 陸川縣; pinyin: Lùchuān Xiàn; Zhuang: Luzconh Hen) is a county of Guangxi, China. It is under the administration of Yulin city.

== Administrative divisions ==
Luchuan County is divided into 14 towns:

- Wenquan 温泉镇
- Michang 米场镇
- Mapo 马坡镇
- Shanluo 珊罗镇
- Pingle 平乐镇
- Shapo 沙坡镇
- Daqiao 大桥镇
- Wushi 乌石镇
- Liangtian 良田镇
- Qinghu 清湖镇
- Gucheng 古城镇
- Shahu 沙湖镇
- Hengshan 横山镇
- Tanmian 滩面镇

== Climate ==
Climate data for Luchuan, elevation 122 m (400 ft), (1991–2020 normals, extremes 1955–present)
Month	Jan	Feb	Mar	Apr	May	Jun	Jul	Aug	Sep	Oct	Nov	Dec	Year
Record high °C (°F)	28.7 (83.7)	31.2 (88.2)	33.4 (92.1)	34.6 (94.3)	35.1 (95.2)	37.7 (99.9)	38.0 (100.4)	36.9 (98.4)	36.2 (97.2)	35.6 (96.1)	33.4 (92.1)	29.4 (84.9)	38.0 (100.4)
Mean daily maximum °C (°F)	18.1 (64.6)	19.7 (67.5)	22.3 (72.1)	26.8 (80.2)	30.4 (86.7)	31.9 (89.4)	32.6 (90.7)	32.6 (90.7)	31.6 (88.9)	29.0 (84.2)	25.2 (77.4)	20.4 (68.7)	26.7 (80.1)
Daily mean °C (°F)	13.5 (56.3)	15.4 (59.7)	18.4 (65.1)	22.8 (73.0)	25.9 (78.6)	27.5 (81.5)	28.0 (82.4)	27.6 (81.7)	26.4 (79.5)	23.6 (74.5)	19.7 (67.5)	15.1 (59.2)	22.0 (71.6)
Mean daily minimum °C (°F)	10.3 (50.5)	12.5 (54.5)	15.7 (60.3)	20.0 (68.0)	22.9 (73.2)	24.6 (76.3)	24.9 (76.8)	24.5 (76.1)	23.0 (73.4)	19.9 (67.8)	15.9 (60.6)	11.6 (52.9)	18.8 (65.9)
Record low °C (°F)	−2.7 (27.1)	1.7 (35.1)	3.0 (37.4)	8.3 (46.9)	13.8 (56.8)	17.7 (63.9)	20.3 (68.5)	20.7 (69.3)	15.0 (59.0)	10.7 (51.3)	4.0 (39.2)	0.3 (32.5)	−2.7 (27.1)
Average precipitation mm (inches)	62.6 (2.46)	55.0 (2.17)	85.7 (3.37)	166.6 (6.56)	284.3 (11.19)	318.3 (12.53)	304.9 (12.00)	272.2 (10.72)	189.6 (7.46)	85.8 (3.38)	62.5 (2.46)	45.4 (1.79)	1,932.9 (76.09)
Average precipitation days (≥ 0.1 mm)	10.4	12.3	15.9	15.4	18.8	19.9	19.8	19.3	13.5	6.6	7.2	7.9	167
Average relative humidity (%)	79	82	84	84	84	85	83	85	82	77	75	74	81
Mean monthly sunshine hours	90.1	69.0	55.0	84.4	136.9	147.1	183.8	182.8	177.9	191.1	155.4	133.9	1,607.4
Percentage possible sunshine	27	21	15	22	33	37	45	46	49	54	47	40	36
Source: China Meteorological Administrationall-time record lowall-time October record
