= List of administrative divisions of Zhejiang =

Zhejiang Province
- Province
- Capital: Hangzhou

Prefecture-level divisions
- Sub-provincial cities: 2
- Prefectural cities: 9

County level divisions
- County cities: 20
- Counties: 32
- Autonomous counties: 1
- Districts: 37

Township level divisions
- Towns: 670
- Townships: 293
- Ethnic townships / towns^{*}: 18
- Subdistricts: 375

Villages level divisions
- Communities: 4,413
- Administrative villages: 27,518

Zhejiang, a province of the People's Republic of China, is made up of the following three levels of administrative division.

== Administrative divisions ==
All of these administrative divisions are explained in greater detail at Administrative divisions of the People's Republic of China. This chart lists only prefecture-level and county-level divisions of Zhejiang.

Prefecture level	County Level				
Prefecture level	Name	Chinese	Hanyu Pinyin	Division code	
Hangzhou city 杭州市; Hángzhōu Shì (Capital – Sub-provincial) (3301 / HGH)	Shangcheng District	上城区	Shàngchéng Qū	330102	SCQ
Hangzhou city 杭州市; Hángzhōu Shì (Capital – Sub-provincial) (3301 / HGH)	Gongshu District	拱墅区	Gǒngshù Qū	330105	GSQ
Hangzhou city 杭州市; Hángzhōu Shì (Capital – Sub-provincial) (3301 / HGH)	Xihu District	西湖区	Xīhú Qū	330106	XHU
Hangzhou city 杭州市; Hángzhōu Shì (Capital – Sub-provincial) (3301 / HGH)	Binjiang District	滨江区	Bīnjiāng Qū	330108	BJQ
Hangzhou city 杭州市; Hángzhōu Shì (Capital – Sub-provincial) (3301 / HGH)	Xiaoshan District	萧山区	Xiāoshān Qū	330109	XIS
Hangzhou city 杭州市; Hángzhōu Shì (Capital – Sub-provincial) (3301 / HGH)	Yuhang District	余杭区	Yúháng Qū	330110	YHG
Hangzhou city 杭州市; Hángzhōu Shì (Capital – Sub-provincial) (3301 / HGH)	Linping District	临平区	Línpíng Qū	330113	
Hangzhou city 杭州市; Hángzhōu Shì (Capital – Sub-provincial) (3301 / HGH)	Qiantang District	钱塘区	Qiántáng Qū	330114	
Hangzhou city 杭州市; Hángzhōu Shì (Capital – Sub-provincial) (3301 / HGH)	Fuyang District	富阳区	Fùyáng Qū	330111	FYQ
Hangzhou city 杭州市; Hángzhōu Shì (Capital – Sub-provincial) (3301 / HGH)	Lin'an District	临安区	Lín'ān Qū	330112	
Hangzhou city 杭州市; Hángzhōu Shì (Capital – Sub-provincial) (3301 / HGH)	Tonglu County	桐庐县	Tónglú Xiàn	330122	TLU
Hangzhou city 杭州市; Hángzhōu Shì (Capital – Sub-provincial) (3301 / HGH)	Chun'an County	淳安县	Chún'ān Xiàn	330127	CAZ
Hangzhou city 杭州市; Hángzhōu Shì (Capital – Sub-provincial) (3301 / HGH)	Jiande city	建德市	Jiàndé Shì	330182	JDS
Ningbo city 宁波市; Níngbō Shì (Sub-provincial) (3302 / NGB)	Haishu District	海曙区	Hǎishǔ Qū	330203	HNB
Ningbo city 宁波市; Níngbō Shì (Sub-provincial) (3302 / NGB)	Jiangbei District	江北区	Jiāngběi Qū	330205	JBQ
Ningbo city 宁波市; Níngbō Shì (Sub-provincial) (3302 / NGB)	Beilun District	北仑区	Běilún Qū	330206	BLN
Ningbo city 宁波市; Níngbō Shì (Sub-provincial) (3302 / NGB)	Zhenhai District	镇海区	Zhènhǎi Qū	330211	ZHF
Ningbo city 宁波市; Níngbō Shì (Sub-provincial) (3302 / NGB)	Yinzhou District	鄞州区	Yínzhōu Qū	330212	YIZ
Ningbo city 宁波市; Níngbō Shì (Sub-provincial) (3302 / NGB)	Fenghua District	奉化区	Fènghuà Qū	330213	FHA
Ningbo city 宁波市; Níngbō Shì (Sub-provincial) (3302 / NGB)	Xiangshan County	象山县	Xiāngshān Xiàn	330225	XSZ
Ningbo city 宁波市; Níngbō Shì (Sub-provincial) (3302 / NGB)	Ninghai County	宁海县	Nínghǎi Xiàn	330226	NHI
Ningbo city 宁波市; Níngbō Shì (Sub-provincial) (3302 / NGB)	Yuyao city	余姚市	Yúyáo Shì	330281	YYO
Ningbo city 宁波市; Níngbō Shì (Sub-provincial) (3302 / NGB)	Cixi city	慈溪市	Cíxī Shì	330282	CXI
Wenzhou city 温州市; Wēnzhōu Shì (3303 / WNZ)	Lucheng District	鹿城区	Lùchéng Qū	330302	LUW
Wenzhou city 温州市; Wēnzhōu Shì (3303 / WNZ)	Longwan District	龙湾区	Lóngwān Qū	330303	LWW
Wenzhou city 温州市; Wēnzhōu Shì (3303 / WNZ)	Ouhai District	瓯海区	Ōuhǎi Qū	330304	OHQ
Wenzhou city 温州市; Wēnzhōu Shì (3303 / WNZ)	Dongtou District	洞头区	Dòngtóu Qū	330305	DTZ
Wenzhou city 温州市; Wēnzhōu Shì (3303 / WNZ)	Yongjia County	永嘉县	Yǒngjiā Xiàn	330324	YJX
Wenzhou city 温州市; Wēnzhōu Shì (3303 / WNZ)	Pingyang County	平阳县	Píngyáng Xiàn	330326	PYG
Wenzhou city 温州市; Wēnzhōu Shì (3303 / WNZ)	Cangnan County	苍南县	Cāngnán Xiàn	330327	CNA
Wenzhou city 温州市; Wēnzhōu Shì (3303 / WNZ)	Wencheng County	文成县	Wénchéng Xiàn	330328	WCZ
Wenzhou city 温州市; Wēnzhōu Shì (3303 / WNZ)	Taishun County	泰顺县	Tàishùn Xiàn	330329	TSZ
Wenzhou city 温州市; Wēnzhōu Shì (3303 / WNZ)	Rui'an city	瑞安市	Ruì'ān Shì	330381	RAS
Wenzhou city 温州市; Wēnzhōu Shì (3303 / WNZ)	Yueqing city	乐清市	Yuèqīng Shì	330382	YQZ
Wenzhou city 温州市; Wēnzhōu Shì (3303 / WNZ)	Longgang city	龙港市	Lónggǎng Shì	330383	
Jiaxing city 嘉兴市; Jiāxīng Shì (3304 / JIX)	Nanhu District	南湖区	Nánhú Qū	330402	NHQ
Jiaxing city 嘉兴市; Jiāxīng Shì (3304 / JIX)	Xiuzhou District	秀洲区	Xiùzhōu Qū	330411	XZH
Jiaxing city 嘉兴市; Jiāxīng Shì (3304 / JIX)	Jiashan County	嘉善县	Jiāshàn Xiàn	330421	JSK
Jiaxing city 嘉兴市; Jiāxīng Shì (3304 / JIX)	Haiyan County	海盐县	Hǎiyán Xiàn	330424	HYN
Jiaxing city 嘉兴市; Jiāxīng Shì (3304 / JIX)	Haining city	海宁市	Hǎiníng Shì	330481	HNG
Jiaxing city 嘉兴市; Jiāxīng Shì (3304 / JIX)	Pinghu city	平湖市	Pínghú Shì	330482	PHU
Jiaxing city 嘉兴市; Jiāxīng Shì (3304 / JIX)	Tongxiang city	桐乡市	Tóngxiāng Shì	330483	TXZ
Huzhou city 湖州市; Húzhōu Shì (3305 / HZH)	Wuxing District	吴兴区	Wúxīng Qū	330502	WXU
Huzhou city 湖州市; Húzhōu Shì (3305 / HZH)	Nanxun District	南浔区	Nánxún Qū	330503	NXQ
Huzhou city 湖州市; Húzhōu Shì (3305 / HZH)	Deqing County	德清县	Déqīng Xiàn	330521	DQX
Huzhou city 湖州市; Húzhōu Shì (3305 / HZH)	Changxing County	长兴县	Chángxīng Xiàn	330522	CXG
Huzhou city 湖州市; Húzhōu Shì (3305 / HZH)	Anji County	安吉县	Ānjí Xiàn	330523	AJI
Shaoxing city 绍兴市; Shàoxīng Shì (3306 / SXG)	Yuecheng District	越城区	Yuèchéng Qū	330602	YSX
Shaoxing city 绍兴市; Shàoxīng Shì (3306 / SXG)	Keqiao District	柯桥区	Kēqiáo Qū	330603	KQO
Shaoxing city 绍兴市; Shàoxīng Shì (3306 / SXG)	Shangyu District	上虞区	Shàngyú Qū	330604	SYG
Shaoxing city 绍兴市; Shàoxīng Shì (3306 / SXG)	Xinchang County	新昌县	Xīnchāng Xiàn	330624	XCX
Shaoxing city 绍兴市; Shàoxīng Shì (3306 / SXG)	Zhuji city	诸暨市	Zhūjì Shì	330681	ZHJ
Shaoxing city 绍兴市; Shàoxīng Shì (3306 / SXG)	Shengzhou city	嵊州市	Shèngzhōu Shì	330683	SGZ
Jinhua city 金华市; Jīnhuá Shì (3307 / JHA)	Wucheng District	婺城区	Wùchéng Qū	330702	WCF
Jinhua city 金华市; Jīnhuá Shì (3307 / JHA)	Jindong District	金东区	Jīndōng Qū	330703	JDQ
Jinhua city 金华市; Jīnhuá Shì (3307 / JHA)	Wuyi County	武义县	Wǔyì Xiàn	330723	WYX
Jinhua city 金华市; Jīnhuá Shì (3307 / JHA)	Pujiang County	浦江县	Pǔjiāng Xiàn	330726	PJG
Jinhua city 金华市; Jīnhuá Shì (3307 / JHA)	Pan'an County	磐安县	Pán'ān Xiàn	330727	PAX
Jinhua city 金华市; Jīnhuá Shì (3307 / JHA)	Lanxi city	兰溪市	Lánxī Shì	330781	LXZ
Jinhua city 金华市; Jīnhuá Shì (3307 / JHA)	Yiwu city	义乌市	Yìwū Shì	330782	YWS
Jinhua city 金华市; Jīnhuá Shì (3307 / JHA)	Dongyang city	东阳市	Dōngyáng Shì	330783	DGY
Jinhua city 金华市; Jīnhuá Shì (3307 / JHA)	Yongkang city	永康市	Yǒngkāng Shì	330784	YKG
Quzhou city 衢州市; Qúzhōu Shì (3308 / QUZ)	Kecheng District	柯城区	Kēchéng Qū	330802	KEC
Quzhou city 衢州市; Qúzhōu Shì (3308 / QUZ)	Qujiang District	衢江区	Qújiāng Qū	330803	QJI
Quzhou city 衢州市; Qúzhōu Shì (3308 / QUZ)	Changshan County	常山县	Chángshān Xiàn	330822	CSN
Quzhou city 衢州市; Qúzhōu Shì (3308 / QUZ)	Kaihua County	开化县	Kāihuà Xiàn	330824	KHU
Quzhou city 衢州市; Qúzhōu Shì (3308 / QUZ)	Longyou County	龙游县	Lóngyóu Xiàn	330825	LGY
Quzhou city 衢州市; Qúzhōu Shì (3308 / QUZ)	Jiangshan city	江山市	Jiāngshān Shì	330881	JIS
Zhoushan city 舟山市; Zhōushān Shì (3309 / ZOS)	Dinghai District	定海区	Dìnghǎi Qū	330902	DHQ
Zhoushan city 舟山市; Zhōushān Shì (3309 / ZOS)	Putuo District	普陀区	Pǔtuó Qū	330903	PTO
Zhoushan city 舟山市; Zhōushān Shì (3309 / ZOS)	Daishan County	岱山县	Dàishān Xiàn	330921	DSH
Zhoushan city 舟山市; Zhōushān Shì (3309 / ZOS)	Shengsi County	嵊泗县	Shèngsì Xiàn	330922	SSZ
Taizhou city 台州市; Tāizhōu Shì (Note: not Táizhōu) (3310 / TZZ)	Jiaojiang District	椒江区	Jiāojiāng Qū	331002	JJT
Taizhou city 台州市; Tāizhōu Shì (3310 / TZZ)	Huangyan District	黄岩区	Huángyán Qū	331003	HYT
Taizhou city 台州市; Tāizhōu Shì (3310 / TZZ)	Luqiao District	路桥区	Lùqiáo Qū	331004	LQT
Taizhou city 台州市; Tāizhōu Shì (3310 / TZZ)	Sanmen County	三门县	Sānmén Xiàn	331022	SMN
Taizhou city 台州市; Tāizhōu Shì (3310 / TZZ)	Tiantai County	天台县	Tiāntāi Xiàn (Note: not Tiāntái)	331023	TTA
Taizhou city 台州市; Tāizhōu Shì (3310 / TZZ)	Xianju County	仙居县	Xiānjū Xiàn	331024	XJU
Taizhou city 台州市; Tāizhōu Shì (3310 / TZZ)	Wenling city	温岭市	Wēnlǐng Shì	331081	WLS
Taizhou city 台州市; Tāizhōu Shì (3310 / TZZ)	Linhai city	临海市	Línhǎi Shì	331082	LHI
Taizhou city 台州市; Tāizhōu Shì (3310 / TZZ)	Yuhuan city	玉环市	Yùhuán Shì	331083	YHZ
Lishui city 丽水市; Líshuǐ Shì (Note: not Lìshuǐ) (3311 / LSS)	Liandu District	莲都区	Liándū Qū	331102	LID
Lishui city 丽水市; Líshuǐ Shì (3311 / LSS)	Qingtian County	青田县	Qīngtián Xiàn	331121	QTN
Lishui city 丽水市; Líshuǐ Shì (3311 / LSS)	Jinyun County	缙云县	Jìnyún Xiàn	331122	JYP
Lishui city 丽水市; Líshuǐ Shì (3311 / LSS)	Suichang County	遂昌县	Suíchāng Xiàn	331123	SCZ
Lishui city 丽水市; Líshuǐ Shì (3311 / LSS)	Songyang County	松阳县	Sōngyáng Xiàn	331124	SGY
Lishui city 丽水市; Líshuǐ Shì (3311 / LSS)	Yunhe County	云和县	Yúnhé Xiàn	331125	YNH
Lishui city 丽水市; Líshuǐ Shì (3311 / LSS)	Qingyuan County	庆元县	Qìngyuán Xiàn	331126	QYX
Lishui city 丽水市; Líshuǐ Shì (3311 / LSS)	Jingning County (Note: Conventional name: Jingning She Autonomous County; Chinese: 景宁畲族自治县; pinyin: Jǐngníng Shēzú Zìzhìxiàn)	景宁县	Jǐngníng Xiàn	331127	JGN
Lishui city 丽水市; Líshuǐ Shì (3311 / LSS)	Longquan city	龙泉市	Lóngquán Shì	331181	LGQ

== Recent changes in administrative divisions ==
Date	Before	After	Note	Reference
1980-07-07	parts of Huangyan County	Haimen Special District	established	
1980-07-07	parts of Linhai County	Haimen Special District	established	
1980-08-18	Wenzhou (P-City) city district	Dongcheng District, Wenzhou	established	
1980-08-18	Wenzhou (P-City) city district	Nancheng District, Wenzhou	established	
1980-08-18	Wenzhou (P-City) city district	Xicheng District, Wenzhou	established	
1981-01-14	Wuxing County	Huzhou (PC-City)	merged into	
1981-01-14	Jiaxing County	Jiaxing (PC-City)	merged into	
1981-01-14	Shaoxing County	Shaoxing (PC-City)	merged into	
1981-01-14	Jinhua County	Jinhua (PC-City)	merged into	
1981-01-14	Qu County	Quzhou (PC-City)	merged into	
1981-06-18	parts of Pingyang County	Cangnan County	established	
1981-07-21	Haimen Special District	Jiaojiang (PC-City)	reorganized	
1981-09-22	Wenzhou Prefecture	Wenzhou (P-City)	merged into	
1981-12-22	parts of Dongcheng District, Wenzhou	Ouhai County	established	
1982-01-30	parts of Suichang County	Songyang County	established	
1982-08-13	parts of Ningbo Prefecture	Ningbo (P-City)	transferred	
1982-08-13	↳ Zhenhai County	↳ Zhenhai County	transferred	
1983-01-18	all Province-controlled city (P-City) → Prefecture-level city (PL-City)			Civil Affairs Announcement
1983-01-18	all Prefecture-controlled city (PC-City) → County-level city (CL-City)			Civil Affairs Announcement
1983-07-23	parts of Quzhou (CL-City)	Longyou County	established	
1983-07-23	parts of Jinhua (CL-City)	Longyou County	established	
1983-07-23	parts of Dongyang County	Pan'an County	established	
1983-07-23	Ningbo Prefecture	Ningbo (PL-City)	merged into	
1983-07-23	Jiaxing Prefecture	Jiaxing (PL-City) city district	reorganized	
1983-07-23	↳ Jiaxing (CL-City)	Jiaxing (PL-City) city district	disestablished	
1983-07-23	parts of Jiaxing Prefecture	Huzhou (PL-City) city district	established	
1983-07-23	↳ Jiaxing (CL-City)	Huzhou (PL-City) city district	transferred & disestablished	
1983-07-23	↳ Deqing County	↳ Deqing County	transferred	
1983-07-23	↳ Changxing County	↳ Changxing County	transferred	
1983-07-23	↳ Anji County	↳ Anji County	transferred	
1983-07-23	Shaoxing Prefecture	Shaoxing (PL-City) city district	merged into	
1983-07-23	↳ Shaoxing (CL-City)	Shaoxing (PL-City) city district	disestablished	
1983-07-23	↳ Shaoxing (CL-City)	↳ Shaoxing County	disestablished & established	
1983-09-05	Dongcheng District, Wenzhou	Cheng District, Wenzhou	disestablished & established	
1983-09-05	Dongcheng District, Wenzhou	Cheng District, Wenzhou	disestablished & established	
1983-09-05	Nancheng District, Wenzhou	Cheng District, Wenzhou	disestablished & established	
1983-09-05	Xicheng District, Wenzhou	disestablished & established		
1983-09-20	Jiaxing (PL-City) city district	Cheng District, Jiaxing	established	
1983-09-20	Jiao District, Jiaxing	Cheng District, Jiaxing	established	
1983-09-20	Huzhou (PL-City) city district	Cheng District, Huzhou	established	
1983-09-20	Jiao District, Huzhou	Cheng District, Huzhou	established	
1983-09-20	Shaoxing (PL-City) city district	Cheng District, Shaoxing	established	
1984-06-30	parts of Yunhe County	Jingning County (Aut.)	established	
1984-12-06	Cheng District, Wenzhou	Lucheng District	disestablished & established	
1984-12-06	Cheng District, Wenzhou	Longwan District	disestablished & established	
1985-05-15	Jinhua Prefecture	Jinhua (PL-City)	reorganized	
1985-05-15	Jinhua (CL-City)	Wucheng District	disestablished & established	
1985-05-15	Jinhua (CL-City)	Jinhua County	disestablished & established	
1985-05-15	Lanxi County	Lanxi (CL-City)	reorganized	
1985-05-15	parts of Jinhua Prefecture	Quzhou (PL-City)	established	
1985-05-15	↳ Quzhou (CL-City)	↳ Kecheng District County	transferred & reorganized	
1985-05-15	↳ Quzhou (CL-City)	↳ Qu County	transferred & established	
1985-05-15	↳ Jiangshan County	↳ Jiangshan County	transferred	
1985-05-15	↳ Changshan County	↳ Changshan County	transferred	
1985-05-15	↳ Kaihua County	↳ Kaihua County	transferred	
1985-05-15	↳ Longyou County	↳ Longyou County	transferred	
1986-07-01	Zhenhai County	Zhenhai District	reorganized	
1986-07-16	Yuyao County	Yuyao (CL-City)	reorganized	
1986-03-01	Lishui County	Lishui (CL-City)	reorganized	
1986-03-01	Linhai County	Linhai (CL-City)	reorganized	
1986-11-22	Haining County	Haining (CL-City)	reorganized	
1987-01-23	Zhoushan Prefecture	Zhoushan (PL-City)	reorganized	
1987-01-23	Dinghai County	Dinghai District	reorganized	
1987-01-23	Putuo County	Putuo District	reorganized	
1987-04-15	Ruian County	Ruian (CL-City)	reorganized	
1987-09-14	Binhai District	Beilun District	renamed	
1987-11-27	Xiaoshan County	Xiaoshan (CL-City)	reorganized	
1987-11-27	Jiangshan County	Jiangshan (CL-City)	reorganized	
1988-05-25	Yiwu County	Yiwu (CL-City)	reorganized	
1988-05-25	Dongyang County	Dongyang (CL-City)	reorganized	
1988-09-01	Cheng District, Huzhou	Huzhou (PL-City) city district	disestablished	
1988-09-01	Jiao District, Huzhou	Huzhou (PL-City) city district	disestablished	
1988-10-13	Cixi County	Cixi (CL-City)	reorganized	
1988-10-13	Fenghua County	Fenghua (CL-City)	reorganized	
1989-09-27	Huangyan County	Huangyan (CL-City)	reorganized	
1989-09-27	Zhuji County	Zhuji (CL-City)	reorganized	
1990-01-17	Banshan District	Gongshu District	merged	
1990-12-26	Longquan County	Longquan (CL-City)	reorganized	
1991-06-15	Pinghu	Pinghu (CL-City)	reorganized	Civil Affairs [1991]16
1992-03-09	Ouhai County	Ouhai District	reorganized	Civil Affairs [1992]24
1992-04-01	Jiande County	Jiande (CL-City)	reorganized	Civil Affairs [1992]33
1992-08-24	Yongkang County	Yongkang (CL-City)	reorganized	Civil Affairs [1992]93
1992-08-24	Shangyu County	Shangyu (CL-City)	reorganized	Civil Affairs [1992]94
1993-03-26	Tongxiang County	Tongxiang (CL-City)	reorganized	Civil Affairs [1993]62
1993-09-18	Yueqing County	Yueqing (CL-City)	reorganized	Civil Affairs [1993]188
1993-12-01	Cheng District, Jiaxing	Xiucheng District	renamed	Civil Affairs [1993]238
1994-08-22	Taizhou Prefecture	Taizhou (PL-City)	reorganized	State Council [1994]86
1994-08-22	Jiaojiang (CL-City)	Jiaojiang District	reorganized	State Council [1994]86
1994-08-22	parts of Huangyan (CL-City)	Huangyan District	reorganized	State Council [1994]86
1994-08-22	parts of Huangyan (CL-City)	Luqiao District	established	State Council [1994]86
1994-01-18	Fuyang County	Fuyang (CL-City)	reorganized	Civil Affairs [1994]6
1994-02-18	Wenling County	Wenling (CL-City)	reorganized	Civil Affairs [1994]30
1994-04-05	Yuhang County	Yuhang (CL-City)	reorganized	Civil Affairs [1994]50
1995-08-30	Sheng County	Shengzhou (CL-City)	reorganized	Civil Affairs [1995]58
1996-10-28	Lin'an County	Lin'an (CL-City)	reorganized	Civil Affairs [1996]79
1996-12-12	parts of Xihu District	Binjiang District	established	State Council [1996]121
1999-06-21	Jiao District, Jiaxing	Xiuzhou District	merged	Civil Affairs [1999]44
2000-05-20	Lishui Prefecture	Lishui (PL-City)	reorganized	
2000-05-20	Lishui (CL-City)	Liandu District	reorganized	
2000-12-30	Jinhua County	Jindong District	reorganized	
2001-02-02	Xiaoshan (CL-City)	Xiaoshan District	reorganized	State Council [2001]13
2001-02-02	Yuhang (CL-City)	Yuhang District	reorganized	State Council [2001]13
2001-12-10	Qu County	Qujiang District	reorganized	State Council [2001]161
2002-02-01	Yin County	Yinzhou District	reorganized	State Council [2002]8
2003-01-02	Huzhou (PL-City) city district	Wuxing District	disestablished & established	State Council [2003]2
2003-01-02	Huzhou (PL-City) city district	Nanxun District	disestablished & established	State Council [2003]2
2005-05-17	Xiucheng District	Nanhu District	renamed	Civil Affairs [2005]103
2013-10-18	Shaoxing County	Keqiao District	reorganized	State Council [2013]112
2013-10-18	Shangyu (CL-City)	Shangyu District	reorganized	State Council [2013]112
2014-12-13	Fuyang County	Fuyang District	reorganized	State Council [2014]157
2015-07-23	Dongtou County	Dongtou District	reorganized	State Council [2015]122
2016-09-14	Jiangdong District	Yinzhou District	merged into	State Council [2016]158
2016-09-14	parts of Yinzhou District	Haishu District	transferred	State Council [2016]158
2016-09-14	Fenghua City	Fenghua District	reorganized	State Council [2016]158
2017-04-09	Yuhuan County	Yuhuan (CL-City)	reorganized	Civil Affairs [2017]70
2017-07-18	Lin'an (CL-City)	Lin'an District	reorganized	State Council [2017]102
2019-08-26	parts of Cangnan County	Longgang (CL-City)	established	Civil Affairs [2018]83

== Population composition ==
=== Prefectures ===
Prefecture	2010	2000
Hangzhou	8,700,400	6,878,700
Ningbo	7,605,689	5,962,602
Huzhou	2,893,542	2,625,789
Jiaxing	4,501,700	3,583,000
Jinhua	5,361,600	4,571,900
Lishui	2,117,000	2,161,800
Quzhou	2,122,700	2,129,300
Shaoxing	4,912,200	4,304,200
Taizhou	5,968,800	5,153,300
Wenzhou	9,122,100	7,558,000
Zhoushan	1,121,300	1,001,500

=== Counties ===
Name	Prefecture	2010
Shangcheng	Hangzhou	344,600
Xiacheng	Hangzhou	526,100
Jianggan	Hangzhou	998,800
Gongshu	Hangzhou	551,900
Xihu	Hangzhou	820,000
Binjiang	Hangzhou	319,000
Xiaoshan	Hangzhou	1,511,300
Yuhang	Hangzhou	1,170,300
Lin'an	Hangzhou	566,700
Tonglu	Hangzhou	406,400
Chun'an	Hangzhou	336,800
Jiande	Hangzhou	430,800
Fuyang	Hangzhou	717,700
Haishu	Ningbo	373,742
Jiangbei	Ningbo	361,242
Beilun	Ningbo	612,267
Zhenhai	Ningbo	418,500
Xiangshan	Ningbo	503279
Yinzhou	Ningbo	1,359,198
Fenghua District	Ningbo	491,697
Ninghai	Ningbo	646,074
Yuyao	Ningbo	1,010,659
Cixi	Ningbo	1,462,383
Lucheng	Wenzhou	1,293,300
Longwan	Wenzhou	749,300
Ouhai	Wenzhou	996,900
Dongtou	Wenzhou	87,700
Yongjia	Wenzhou	789,200
Pingyang	Wenzhou	761,700
Wencheng	Wenzhou	212,100
Taishun	Wenzhou	233,400
Cangnan	Wenzhou	1,184,600
Ruian	Wenzhou	1,424,700
Yueqing	Wenzhou	1,389,300
Yueqing	Wenzhou	1,389,300
Longgang	Wenzhou	not established
Nanhu	Jiaxing	612,771
Xiuzhou	Jiaxing	589,253
Jiashan	Jiaxing	574,233
Haiyan	Jiaxing	430,928
Haining	Jiaxing	807,094
Pinghu	Jiaxing	671,851
Tongxiang	Jiaxing	815,803
Wuxing	Huzhou	757,165
Nanxun	Huzhou	536,054
Deqing	Huzhou	491,789
Changxing	Huzhou	641,982
Anji	Huzhou	466,552
Yuecheng	Shaoxing	883,800
Shaoxing→Keqiao	Shaoxing	1,325,800
Xinchang	Shaoxing	380,400
Zhuji	Shaoxing	1,157,900
Shangyu	Shaoxing	779,400
Shengzhou	Shaoxing	679,800
Wucheng	Jinhua	761,700
Jindong	Jinhua	315,600
Wuyi	Jinhua	349,900
Pujiang	Jinhua	437,300
Pan'an	Jinhua	174,700
Lanxi	Jinhua	560,500
Yiwu	Jinhua	1,234,000
Dongyang	Jinhua	804,400
Yongkang	Jinhua	723,500
Kecheng	Quzhou	464,500
Qujiang	Quzhou	341,400
Changshan	Quzhou	241,400
Kaihua	Quzhou	245,100
Longyou	Quzhou	362,400
Jiangshan	Quzhou	467,900
Dinghai	Zhoushan	464,200
Putuo	Zhoushan	378,800
Daishan	Zhoushan	202,200
Shengsi	Zhoushan	76,100
Jiaojiang	Taizhou	653,800
Huangyan	Taizhou	632,100
Luqiao	Taizhou	616,600
Yuhuan	Taizhou	616,300
Sanmen	Taizhou	328,900
Tiantai	Taizhou	382,800
Xianju	Taizhou	342,700
Wenling	Taizhou	1,366,800
Linhai	Taizhou	1,028,800
Liandu	Lishui	451,400
Qingtian	Lishui	336,500
Jinyun	Lishui	358,900
Suichang	Lishui	190,200
Songyang	Lishui	185,100
Yunhe	Lishui	111,600
Qingyuan	Lishui	141,500
Jingning	Lishui	107,100
Longquan	Lishui	234,600
Jiangdong (disestablished)	Ningbo	366,648
