= List of people from Lishui =

This is a list of people from Lishui prefecture in Zhejiang province. The people listed include those both from Lishui city and the counties and county-level city under its present administration.

== C ==
- Chen Cheng (simplified Chinese: 陈诚; traditional Chinese: 陳誠; pinyin: Chén Chéng) - ROC politician and military leader
- Chen Tiexiong (simplified Chinese: 陈铁雄; traditional Chinese: 陳鐵雄; pinyin: Chén Tiěxióng) - administrator, former mayor of Taizhou

== D ==
- Du Guangting (Chinese: 杜光庭; pinyin: Dù Guāngtíng) - Tang dynasty Daoist
- Duanmu Guohu (simplified Chinese: 端木国瑚; traditional Chinese: 端木國瑚; pinyin: Duānmù Guóhú) - Qing dynasty man of letters and poet

== H ==
- He Zhizhong (simplified Chinese: 何执中; traditional Chinese: 何執中; pinyin: Hé Zhízhōng) - Song official

== J ==
- Jiang Teli (Chinese: 姜特立; pinyin: Jiāng Tèlì) - Southern Song poet

== K ==
- Ke Jie (Chinese: 柯洁; pinyin: Kē Jié) - professional Go player of 9 dan rank.

== L ==
- Li Lingwei (Chinese: 李玲蔚; pinyin: Lǐ Língwèi) - badminton player
- Li Yang (simplified Chinese: 力扬; traditional Chinese: 力揚; pinyin: Lì Yáng) - educator and littérateur, also involved in politics and administration
- Li Zubai (Chinese: 李祖白; pinyin: Lǐ Zǔbái) - lieutenant general in the National Revolutionary Army turned CCP secret service agent
- Liu Bowen - Yuan and Ming dynasty military strategist, statesman, poet, and prophet

== S ==
- Sung Hsi (Chinese: 宋晞; pinyin: Sòng Xī) - historian

== T ==
- Tang Situi (simplified Chinese: 汤思退; traditional Chinese: 湯思退; pinyin: Tāng Sītuì) - Southern Song politician, official, and prime minister

== W ==
- Wang Shifu (Chinese: 王仕福; pinyin: Wáng Shìfú) - Home-run record holder
- Wang Hao (Chinese: 王浩; pinyin: Wáng Hào) - Tae-kwon-do athlete
- Wei Lan (simplified Chinese: 魏兰; traditional Chinese: 魏蘭; pinyin: Wèi Lán) - Qing revolutionary and politician
- Wu Gongda (simplified Chinese: 吴公达; traditional Chinese: 吳公達; pinyin: Wú Gōngdá) - imperial administrator

== X ==
- Xiong Dun (熊頓) - cartoonist and cancer memoirist

== Y ==
- Yeh Fa-shan (simplified Chinese: 叶法善; traditional Chinese: 葉法善; pinyin: Yè Fǎshàn) - Tang dynasty Daoist, ascended to immortal status
- Ye Shaoweng (simplified Chinese: 叶绍翁; traditional Chinese: 葉紹翁; pinyin: Yè Shàowēng) - Southern Song poet

== Z ==
- Zhang Naiqi (Chinese: 章乃器; pinyin: Zhāng Nǎiqì) - one of the founders of the China National Democratic Association and Xin Pinglun magazine, banker, and administrator
- Zhang Ping (Chinese: 章平; pinyin: Zhāng Píng) - poet
- Zhao Jingshen (simplified Chinese: 赵景深; traditional Chinese: 趙景深; pinyin: Zhào Jǐngshēn) - author and translator
