= JBQ =

JBQ may refer to:

- La Isabela International Airport (IATA code JBQ), an airport near Santo-Domingo, Dominican Republic
- Jewish Bible Quarterly, a journal about the Hebrew Bible
- Jiangbei District, Ningbo, a district of Ningbo, Zhejiang, China; see List of administrative divisions of Zhejiang
