= Lishui County =

Lishui County may refer to:

- Lishui District, formerly Lishui County (溧水县), Jiangsu, China
- Liandu District, formerly Lishui County (丽水县), Zhejiang, China
