= JGQ =

JGQ can refer to:

- Jianggan District, a district of Zhejiang province, China; see List of administrative divisions of Zhejiang
- Dombeyoideae, a subfamily of flowering plants, by Catalogue of Life identifier
