= BJQ =

BJQ or bjq can refer to:

- Southern Betsimisaraka Malagasy, a dialect of Malagasy, the national language of Madagascar, by former ISO 639-3 code; see ISO 639 macrolanguage#mlg
- Baghora, a train station in Madhya Pradesh, India; see List of railway stations in India#B
- Bahja Airport, an airport in Bahja, Oman, by IATA code; see List of airports by IATA airport code: B#BJ
- Shenzhen East, a train station in Shenzhen, Guangdong, China; see Guangzhou–Shenzhen railway#Stations
- Binjiang District, a district in Hangzhou, Zhejiang, China; see List of administrative divisions of Zhejiang
