= Baoxi Township =

Baoxi Township 宝溪乡
- Township
- Location in Zhejiang
- Coordinates: 28°0′22″N 118°45′37″E
- Country: People's Republic of China
- Province: Zhejiang
- Prefecture-level city: Lishui
- County-level city: Longquan
- Village-level divisions: 6 villages
- Time zone: UTC+8 (China Standard)

Baoxi Township (simplified Chinese: 宝溪乡; traditional Chinese: 寶溪鄉; pinyin: Bǎoxī Xiāng) is a township of Longquan in southwestern Zhejiang province, China. As of 2023, it administers Xitou Village (溪头村), Gongling Village (龚岭村), Baojian Village (宝鉴村), Xiyuantian Village (溪源田村), Gaoshan Village (高山村), and Gaotang Village (高塘村).

== See also ==
- List of township-level divisions of Zhejiang
