= Yuanhe =

Yuanhe may refer to:

== Locations ==
- Yuanhe, Hongjiang (沅河镇), a town of Hongjiang City, Hunan.
- Yuanhe Subdistrict, Suzhou (元和街道), a subdistrict in Xiangcheng District, Suzhou, Jiangsu, China
- Yuanhe Subdistrict, Xinyu (袁河街道), a subdistrict in Yushui District, Xinyu, Jiangxi, China
- Yuanhe Subdistrict, Yunhe County (元和街道), a subdistrict in Yunhe County, Zhejiang, China

== Historical eras ==
- Yuanhe (84–87), era name used by Emperor Zhang of Han
- Yuanhe (806–820), era name used by Emperor Xianzong of Tang

== See also ==
- Yuan He (403–479), Northern Wei official
- Genna(元和), a Japanese era name with the same spelling as Yuanhe in Chinese characters
