= Vietomartyria baishanzuna =

Scientific classification
- Kingdom: Animalia
- Phylum: Arthropoda
- Class: Insecta
- Order: Lepidoptera
- Family: Micropterigidae
- Genus: Vietomartyria
- Species: V. baishanzuna

Binomial name
- Vietomartyria baishanzuna (Yang, 1995)

Synonyms
- Paramartyria baishanzuna Yang, 1995

Species of moth

Vietomartyria baishanzuna is a species of moth belonging to the family Micropterigidae. It was described in 1995. It is known from Zhejiang Province, China. It was described from Mount Baishanzu.
