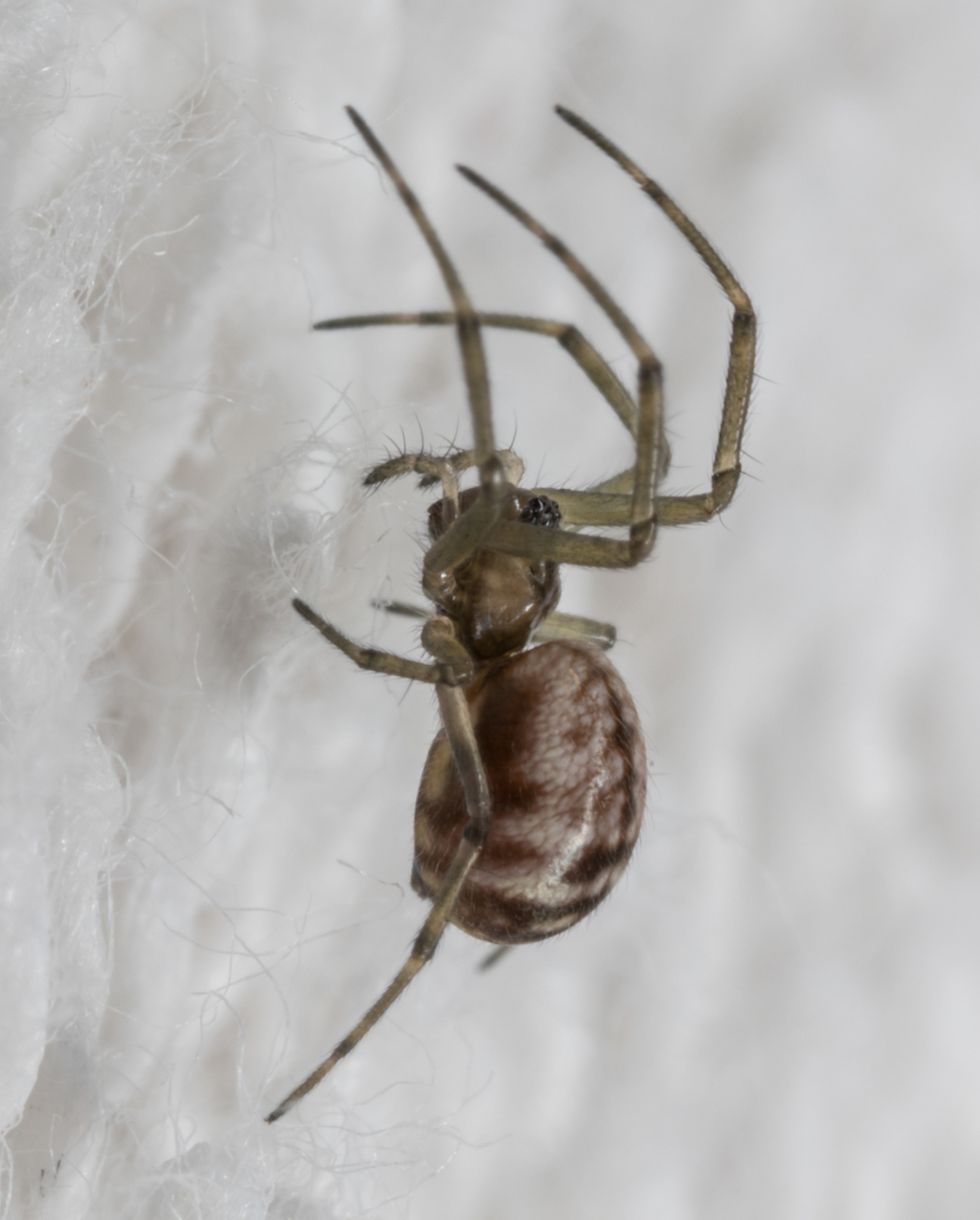
- female from Hong Kong
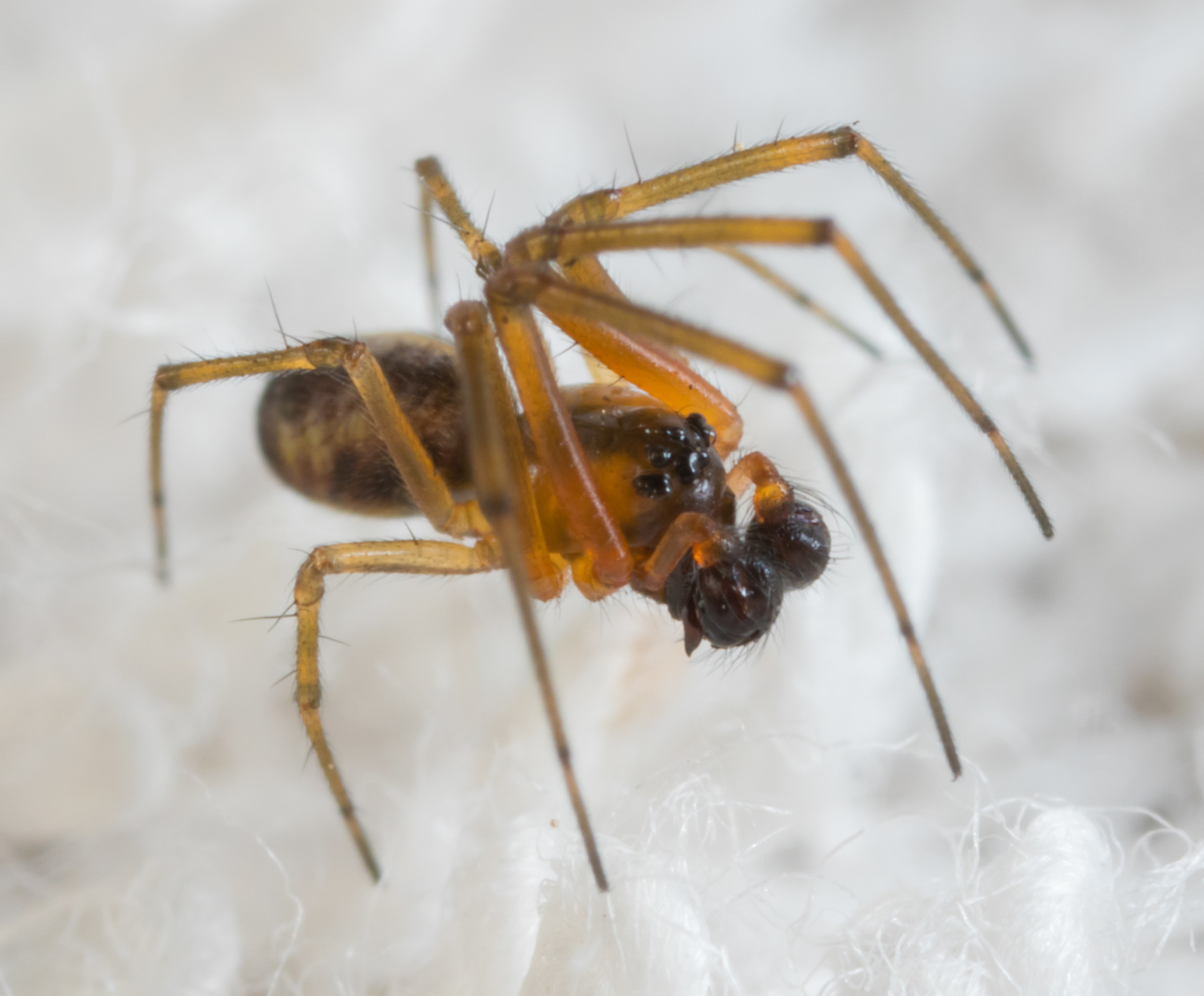
- male from Hong Kong

Scientific classification
- Kingdom: Animalia
- Phylum: Arthropoda
- Subphylum: Chelicerata
- Class: Arachnida
- Order: Araneae
- Infraorder: Araneomorphae
- Family: Linyphiidae
- Genus: Prosoponoides
- Species: P. sinensis

Binomial name
- Prosoponoides sinensis (Chen, 1991)

Synonyms
- Neriene sinensis Chen, 1991

= Prosoponoides sinensis =

Species of spider

Prosoponoides sinensis is a species of spider in the family Linyphiidae (sheet weaver spiders). Originally described as Neriene sinensis, it was transferred to the genus Prosoponoides in 2006.

== Taxonomy ==
The species was originally described by Chen in 1991 as Neriene sinensis based on specimens collected from Baishanzu in Qingyuan County, Zhejiang Province, China. In 2006, Tu and Li transferred the species to the genus Prosoponoides, where it is currently placed.

There is an inconsistency in the species name ending in recent literature, with some sources using sinensis (the original spelling) and others using sinense. The World Spider Catalog currently lists it as Prosoponoides sinense.

== Distribution ==
P. sinensis has been recorded from China, Vietnam, and peninsular Malaysia. In China, it has been found in several provinces including Zhejiang, Fujian, Yunnan, and Chongqing.

== Habitat ==
The species has been collected at elevations ranging from 900 to 1700 meters above sea level in mountainous regions.

== Description ==
Adult males have a body length of approximately 2.05 mm, with the cephalothorax measuring 0.85 × 0.90 mm and the abdomen 1.20 × 0.75 mm. The carapace is yellow with dark brown foveal and radial grooves. The abdomen is yellow with a central longitudinal stripe and several transverse bands, with the posterior markings being darker than the anterior ones.

Adult females are larger than males, with a body length of approximately 2.95 mm. The cephalothorax measures 1.05 × 1.00 mm and the abdomen 1.90 × 1.20 mm. Females are generally darker in coloration than males, with more pronounced abdominal markings surrounded by silvery scale-like patterns.
