= COVID-19 pandemic in Zhejiang =

- Disease: COVID-19
- Pathogen: SARS-CoV-2
- Location: Zhejiang, China
- First outbreak: Wuhan, Hubei
- Arrival date: 2020
- Confirmed cases: 6,147
- Recovered: 4,829
- Deaths: 1

The COVID-19 pandemic reached the province of Zhejiang, China.

== Statistics ==
Division	Active	Confirmed	Deceased	Recovered
Zhejiang		6,147	1	4,829
Hangzhou (including imported cases)	1,753			
Wenzhou (including imported cases)	830			
Shaoxing (including imported cases)	700			
Ningbo (including imported cases)	744			
Jiaxing (including imported cases)	213			
Taizhou, Zhejiang (including imported cases)	287			
Jinhua (including imported cases)	283			
Quzhou (except Shilifeng Prison)	274		14	
Shilifeng Prison (Quzhou)	36		36	
Zhoushan (including imported cases)	112		11	
Lishui (including imported cases)	71		36	
Huzhou (including imported cases)	192		12	
To be clarified (including imported cases)				

== Distribution of cases in prefecture-level cities ==
The following is the distribution of confirmed cases in prefecture-level cities, and the sources of the data are the official websites of prefecture-level cities.

Distribution of cases in prefecture-level cities in Zhejiang Province
prefecture level city	confirmed cases	Case Distribution and Remarks
Hangzhou	1753	1331 cases to be clarified
Ningbo	744	310 cases to be clarified
Wenzhou	830	283 cases to be clarified
Jiaxing	213	52 cases to be clarified
Huzhou	192	158 cases to be clarified
Shaoxing	700	247 cases to be clarified
Jinhua	283	32 cases to be clarified
Quzhou	274	139 cases to be clarified
Taizhou	287	114 cases to be clarified
Lishui	71	28 cases to be clarified

== Timeline ==
=== 2023 ===
On Jan. 9, authorities in Zhejiang province said the province had passed the peak of its first wave of infections.
