= Ye Shaoweng =

Ye Shaoweng (Chinese: 葉紹翁; Wade–Giles: Yeh Shao-weng; fl. 1200–1250) was a Southern Song dynasty Chinese poet from Longquan, in modern Lishui, Zhejiang province. He belonged to the Jianghu (Rivers and Lakes) School of poets, known for its unadorned style of poetry. He was an academician serving in the imperial archives in the capital Hangzhou, and authored a history on the reigns of the first four emperors of the Southern Song entitled Sicao Jianwen Lu (四朝見聞錄), covering the period of 1127–1224. He was a friend of the Neo-Confucian scholar Zhen Dexiu. Little else is known about his life.

Ye Shaoweng's most famous poem is Youyuan Buzhi (Visiting a Private Garden without Success):

遊園不值 Visiting a Private Garden without Success

應憐屐齒印蒼苔 It must be because he hates clogs on his moss
十扣柴扉久不開 I knock ten times still his gate stayed closed
春色滿園關不住 but spring can't be kept locked in a garden
一支紅杏出牆來 a branch of red blossoms reached past the wall

The last couplet is often reused in later works, its meaning recast as a sexual innuendo. The African-American author Richard Wright wrote two haikus which bear close resemblance to Ye's poem.

== Sources ==
- Davis, A.R. (1990). A Book of Chinese Verse. Hong Kong University Press. ISBN 978-962-209-228-0.
- Hakutani, Yoshinobu, ed. (2011). Cross-Cultural Visions in African American Literature: West Meets East. Palgrave Macmillan. ISBN 978-0-230-11912-3.
- Lowry, Kathryn A. (2005). The Tapestry of Popular Songs in 16th- and 17th Century China: Reading, Imitation, And Desire. BRILL. ISBN 90-04-14586-9.
- Red Pine (2012). Poems of the Masters: China's Classic Anthology of T'ang and Sung Dynasty Verse. Copper Canyon Press. ISBN 978-1-61932-088-8.
