= 2012 World Freestyle Skating Championships =

- Location: Lishui, China
- Start date: August 23, 2012
- End date: August 25, 2012

The 6th World Freestyle Skating Championships were held in Lishui, China from August 23 to August 25, 2012.

== Participating nations ==
24 nations entered the competition.

- Belarus
- Brazil
- China
- Chinese Taipei
- Czech Republic
- France
- Germany
- Hong Kong
- India
- Indonesia
- Iran
- Italy
- Japan
- Malaysia
- Mexico
- Poland
- Russia
- Saudi Arabia
- Singapore
- South Korea
- Spain
- Thailand
- Ukraine
- Vietnam

== Medal table ==
Rank	Nation	Gold	Silver	Bronze	Total
1	China (CHN)	8	8	4	20
2	South Korea (KOR)	2	1	1	4
3	Russia (RUS)	1	2	1	4
4	Italy (ITA)	1	1	2	4
5	Chinese Taipei (TPE)	1	1	1	3
6	France (FRA)	0	0	3	3
7	Iran (IRN)	0	0	1	1
7	Poland (POL)	0	0	1	1
Totals (8 entries)		13	13	14	40
