= Songyang Catholic Church =

- 松阳天主教堂
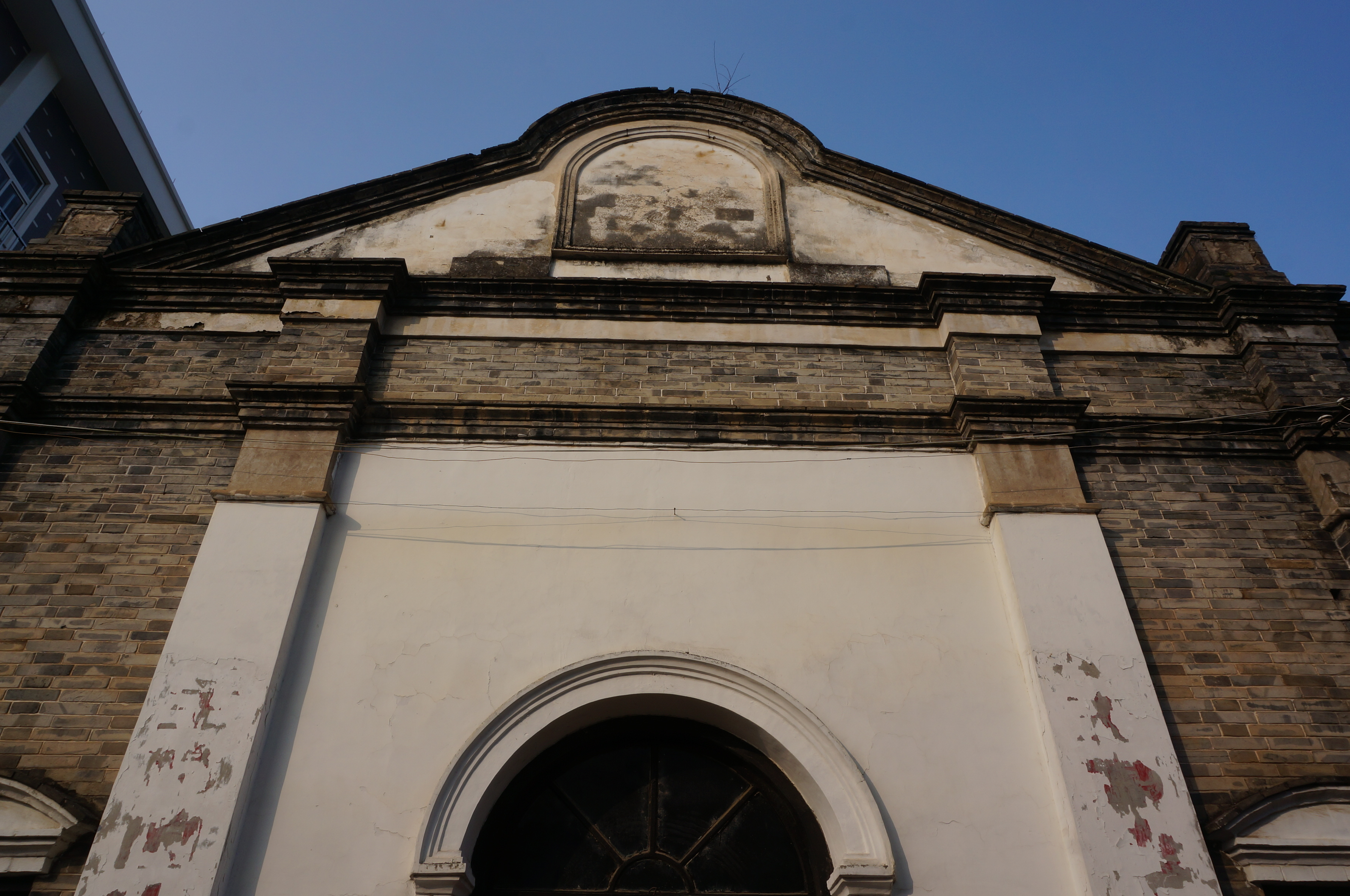
- Songyang Catholic Church in December 2016.

- Location in Zhejiang
- 28°27′24″N 119°29′33″E
- Location: Xiping Subdistrict, Songyang County, Zhejiang, China
- Country: China
- Denomination: Roman Catholic

History
- Status: Parish church
- Founded: Guangxu period (1875–1908) of the Qing dynasty (1644–1911)

Architecture
- Functional status: Active
- Architectural type: Church building
- Style: Imitating European architecture

Specifications
- Materials: Bricks

Songyang Catholic Church (simplified Chinese: 松阳天主教堂; traditional Chinese: 松陽天主教堂; pinyin: Sōngyáng Tiānzhūjiàotáng) is a Roman Catholic Church located in Xiping Subdistrict, Songyang County, Zhejiang, China.

== History ==
Songyang Catholic Church was built in the Guangxu period (1875–1908) of the Qing dynasty (1644–1911). It is the only well-preserved Catholic Church in Lishui city.

== Architecture ==
Now the existing main buildings include the Church, the Priest Building and living buildings.
