= Prosoponoides =

Scientific classification
- Kingdom: Animalia
- Phylum: Arthropoda
- Subphylum: Chelicerata
- Class: Arachnida
- Order: Araneae
- Infraorder: Araneomorphae
- Family: Linyphiidae
- Genus: Prosoponoides; Millidge & Russell-Smith, 1992

Type species
- P. hamatum Millidge & Russell-Smith, 1992

Species
- 19, see text

Genus of spiders

Prosoponoides is a genus of Asian sheet weavers that was first described by Alfred Frank Millidge & A. Russell-Smith in 1992.

== Species ==
As of January 2023 it contains nineteen species, found in Asia:

- Prosoponoides bangbieense Irfan, Zhang & Peng, 2022 – China
- Prosoponoides corneum Irfan, Zhang & Peng, 2022 – China
- Prosoponoides dongshaofangense Irfan, Zhang & Peng, 2022 – China
- Prosoponoides guanduense Irfan, Zhang & Peng, 2022 – China
- Prosoponoides hamatum Millidge & Russell-Smith, 1992 (type) – China, Indonesia (Sumatra)
- Prosoponoides idukkiense Domichan & Sunil Jose, 2022 – India
- Prosoponoides jambi Tanasevitch, 2017 – Indonesia (Sumatra)
- Prosoponoides kaharianum Millidge & Russell-Smith, 1992 – Indonesia (Borneo, Java)
- Prosoponoides longiprojectum Irfan, Zhang & Peng, 2022 – China
- Prosoponoides longyangense Irfan, Zhang & Peng, 2022 – China
- Prosoponoides minutum Irfan, Zhang & Peng, 2022 – China
- Prosoponoides pianmaense Irfan, Zhang & Peng, 2022 – China
- Prosoponoides simile Millidge & Russell-Smith, 1992 – Thailand
- Prosoponoides sinensis (Chen, 1991) – China, Vietnam, Malaysia (peninsula)
- Prosoponoides yakouense Irfan, Zhang & Peng, 2022 – China
- Prosoponoides yani Irfan, Zhang & Peng, 2022 – China
- Prosoponoides yapingense Irfan, Zhang & Peng, 2022 – China
- Prosoponoides youyiense Liu & J. Chen, 2020 – China
- Prosoponoides yunnanense Irfan, Zhang & Peng, 2022 – China
