= Vietomartyria jinggangana =

Scientific classification
- Kingdom: Animalia
- Phylum: Arthropoda
- Class: Insecta
- Order: Lepidoptera
- Family: Micropterigidae
- Genus: Vietomartyria
- Species: V. jinggangana

Binomial name
- Vietomartyria jinggangana (Yang, 1980)

Synonyms
- Paramartyria jinggangana Yang, 1980

Species of moth

Vietomartyria jinggangana is a species of moth belonging to the family Micropterigidae. It was described in 1980. It is known from Jinggang Mountains in Jiangxi, China.
