= Vietomartyria expeditionis =

Scientific classification
- Kingdom: Animalia
- Phylum: Arthropoda
- Clade: Pancrustacea
- Class: Insecta
- Order: Lepidoptera
- Family: Micropterigidae
- Genus: Vietomartyria
- Species: V. expeditionis

Binomial name
- Vietomartyria expeditionis (Mey, 1997)

Synonyms
- Paramartyria expeditionis Mey, 1997

Species of moth

Vietomartyria expeditionis is a species of moth belonging to the family Micropterigidae. It was described by Wolfram Mey in 1997. It is known from the mountainous areas of northern Vietnam.

The length of the forewings is 3.8 mm.
