= Fengyangshan–Baishanzu National Nature Reserve =

Nature reserve in China

Fengyangshan-Baishanzu National Nature Reserve
- IUCN category V (protected landscape/seascape)
- Location within China
- Location: Zhejiang, China
- Nearest city: Lishui
- Coordinates: 27.83°N 119.18°E
- Area: 260.51 km^{2} (100.58 sq mi)
- Established: 1992

Fengyangshan-Baishanzu National Nature Reserve is a nature reserve in southwest Zhejiang province of eastern China. The reserve lies within Longquan and Qingyuan counties. The highest peak of Zhejiang, Huangmaojian (1,929 metres (6,329 ft)), is located within the reserve. The present reserve was formed in 1992 by merging two provincial-level nature reserves, Fengyang Shan Nature Reserve (established in 1975) and the Baishanzu Nature Reserve (1985).

The reserve consists of two parts. The northern one is named after Mt. Fengyangshan (Chinese: 凤阳山; pinyin: Fèngyángshān); Huangmaojian is the highest point of the mountain. The southern part is named after Mt. Baishanzu (Chinese: 百山祖; pinyin: Bǎishānzǔ). Its highest point is 1,857 metres (6,093 ft), making it the second highest peak in Zhejiang.

== Biology and ecology ==
Classification as a national-level reserve signifies the high conservation value of this mountainous nature reserve.

Wildlife of the reserve include Elliot's pheasant, leopard, clouded leopard, Sumatran serow, and rhesus macaque. Presence of South China tiger faeces in the reserve has been confirmed with genetic methods. 2,203 species of insects have been recorded from the Baishanzu reserve.

The dominant types of vegetation are evergreen broad-leaved forests and needle-broad-leaved mixed forests. According to Zhu et al., the reserve is known as "the cradle of ancient plants in eastern China because of its rich original plant flora". At least 1,448 species and varieties of seed-bearing plants occur in the Fengyangshan reserve, of which 47% are endemic to China. 1,545 species and varieties of seed plants are recorded in the Baishanzu reserve, of which 48% are endemic to China. Baishanzu fir is endemic to Mt. Baishanzu and is classified as critically endangered by the IUCN Red List.
