= Vietomartyria nanlingana =

Scientific classification
- Domain: Eukaryota
- Kingdom: Animalia
- Phylum: Arthropoda
- Class: Insecta
- Order: Lepidoptera
- Family: Micropterigidae
- Genus: Vietomartyria
- Species: V. nanlingana

Binomial name
- Vietomartyria nanlingana Jinbo & Hirowatari, 2009

Species of moth

Vietomartyria nanlingana is a species of moth belonging to the family Micropterigidae. It was described by Hashimoto & Hirowatari in 2009. It is known from Nanling, Guangdong in southern China.
