= Vietomartyria =

Scientific classification
- Kingdom: Animalia
- Phylum: Arthropoda
- Clade: Pancrustacea
- Class: Insecta
- Order: Lepidoptera
- Family: Micropterigidae
- Genus: Vietomartyria; Hashimoto & Mey, 2000

Species
- 6 species (see text)

Genus of moths in family Micropterigidae

Vietomartyria is a genus of small primitive metallic moths in the family Micropterigidae. They occur in Vietnam and southern China.

== Species ==
There are six species:

- Vietomartyria baishanzuna (Yang, 1995)
- Vietomartyria expeditionis (Mey, 1997)
- Vietomartyria gladiator Hirowatari & Huang, 2010
- Vietomartyria jinggangana (Yang, 1980)
- Vietomartyria nankunshana Hashimoto & Hirowatari, 2009
- Vietomartyria nanlingana Jinbo & Hirowatari, 2009
