= Vietomartyria nankunshana =

Scientific classification
- Domain: Eukaryota
- Kingdom: Animalia
- Phylum: Arthropoda
- Class: Insecta
- Order: Lepidoptera
- Family: Micropterigidae
- Genus: Vietomartyria
- Species: V. nankunshana

Binomial name
- Vietomartyria nankunshana Hashimoto & Hirowatari, 2009

Species of moth

Vietomartyria nankunshana is a species of moth belonging to the family Micropterigidae. It was described by Hashimoto & Hirowatari in 2009. It is known from Nankunshan, Guangdong in southern China.
