= Huangmaojian =

Mountain in Zhejiang, China

- 黄茅尖
- Location within China

Highest point
- Elevation: 1,930 m (6,330 ft)
- Prominence: 1,530 m (5,020 ft)
- Listing: Ultra, Ribu
- Coordinates: 27°53′24″N 119°11′11″E

Geography
- Location: Zhejiang, China

Huangmaojian (Chinese: 黄茅尖; pinyin: Huángmáojiān; lit. 'Black Speargrass Peak') is a 1,930-meter (6,330 ft) mountain in Longquan County in southwest of Zhejiang province in eastern China. The mountain is the highest peak of Zhejiang and part of the Wuyi Mountains that have their bulk in Fujian province. Huangmaojian is an ultra prominent peak. The mountain is located within the Fengyangshan–Baishanzu National Nature Reserve.

== See also ==
- List of ultras of Tibet, East Asia and neighbouring areas
