= Abies ziyuanensis =

Conservation status
- Endangered (IUCN 3.1)

Scientific classification
- Kingdom: Plantae
- Clade: Tracheophytes
- Clade: Gymnospermae
- Division: Pinophyta
- Class: Pinopsida
- Order: Pinales
- Family: Pinaceae
- Genus: Abies
- Species: A. ziyuanensis

Binomial name
- Abies ziyuanensis L.K. Fu & S.L. Mo

Species of conifer

Abies ziyuanensis is a species of fir, a conifer in the family Pinaceae. It is only known from four locations in Guangxi and Hunan provinces in China. A. ziyuanensis is related to Abies beshanzuensis, another threatened fir endemic to China.

While the population was in the thousands as recently as the 1970s, there are now thought to be less than 600 trees in existence.
