= Abies beshanzuensis =

- Distribution of Abies beshanzuensis

Conservation status
- Critically Endangered (IUCN 3.1)

Scientific classification
- Kingdom: Plantae
- Clade: Tracheophytes
- Clade: Gymnospermae
- Division: Pinophyta
- Class: Pinopsida
- Order: Pinales
- Family: Pinaceae
- Genus: Abies
- Species: A. beshanzuensis

Binomial name
- Abies beshanzuensis M.H.Wu

Synonyms
- Abies fabri subsp. beshanzuensis (M.H.Wu) Silba

Species of conifer

Abies beshanzuensis (Baishanzu fir, Baishan fir) is a species of fir (genus Abies) in the family Pinaceae. It is endemic to Mt. Baishanzu in southern Zhejiang province in eastern China, where it grows at 1,850 metres (6,070 ft) altitude and is threatened by collection and climate change. The site is within the Fengyangshan – Baishanzu National Nature Reserve. Abies beshanzuensis is classified as critically endangered by the IUCN Red List.

It was discovered in 1963 on the summit of Baishanzu Shan (1,857 m), where only seven trees were found. Three of these were dug up and moved to Beijing Botanical Garden, where they died. By 1987, only three trees were left in the wild, making it the rarest conifer in the world. New planting of grafted plants on Baishanzu Shan and other nearby sites has shown some success, but the species remains critically endangered.

It is a tree growing to 15–17 metres (49–56 ft) tall, with a broad conic crown and a trunk up to 0.8 metres (2 ft 7 in) in diameter. The shoots are stout, pale yellow-brown, hairless or slightly hairy. The leaves are linear, 1.5–4 centimetres (0.6–1.6 in) long and 2.5–3.5 millimetres (0.10–0.14 in) wide, glossy green above, and with two white stomatal bands below. The cones are narrow cylindric-conic, bright green when immature, ripening pale yellow-brown, 6–12 centimetres (2.4–4.7 in) long and 3–4 centimetres (1.2–1.6 in) wide, with exserted and reflexed bracts.

It is closely related to Abies firma from southern Japan, placed with it as the only two members of Abies subsect. Firmae. The species Abies ziyuanensis is included in Abies beshanzuensis as a variety by some botanists, though others place this species in a different subsection of the genus, Abies subsect. Holophyllae.

The species is very rare in plant collections, and cultivated plants outside of China may be A. ziyuanensis mislabelled. The largest and likely the only specimen in Canada, approximately 6.5 m (20 ft) in 2023, is located at Whistling Gardens public plant collection located in Wilsonville, Ontario.
