= Songyang County =

Songyang 松阳县 Sungyan
- County
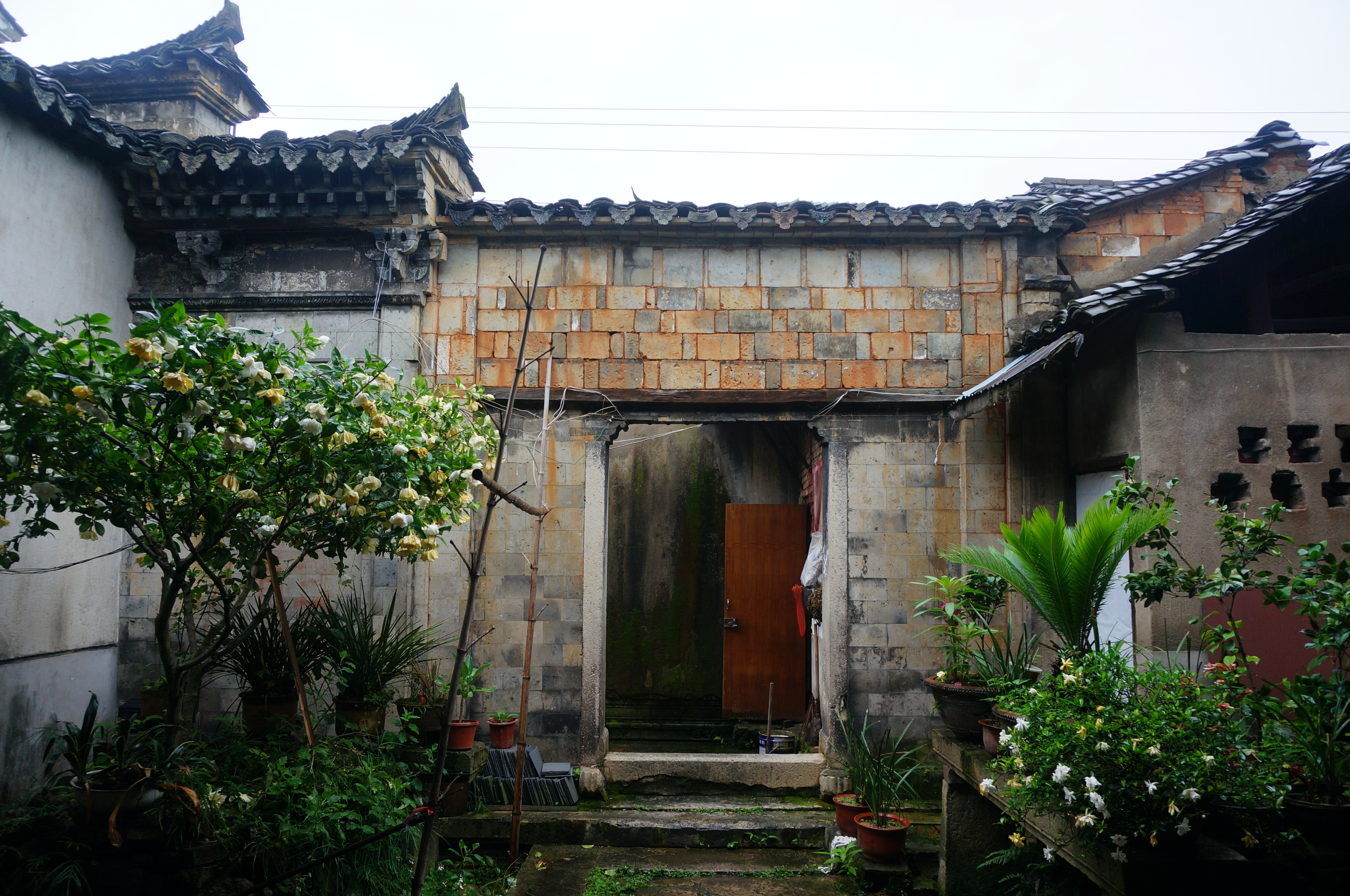

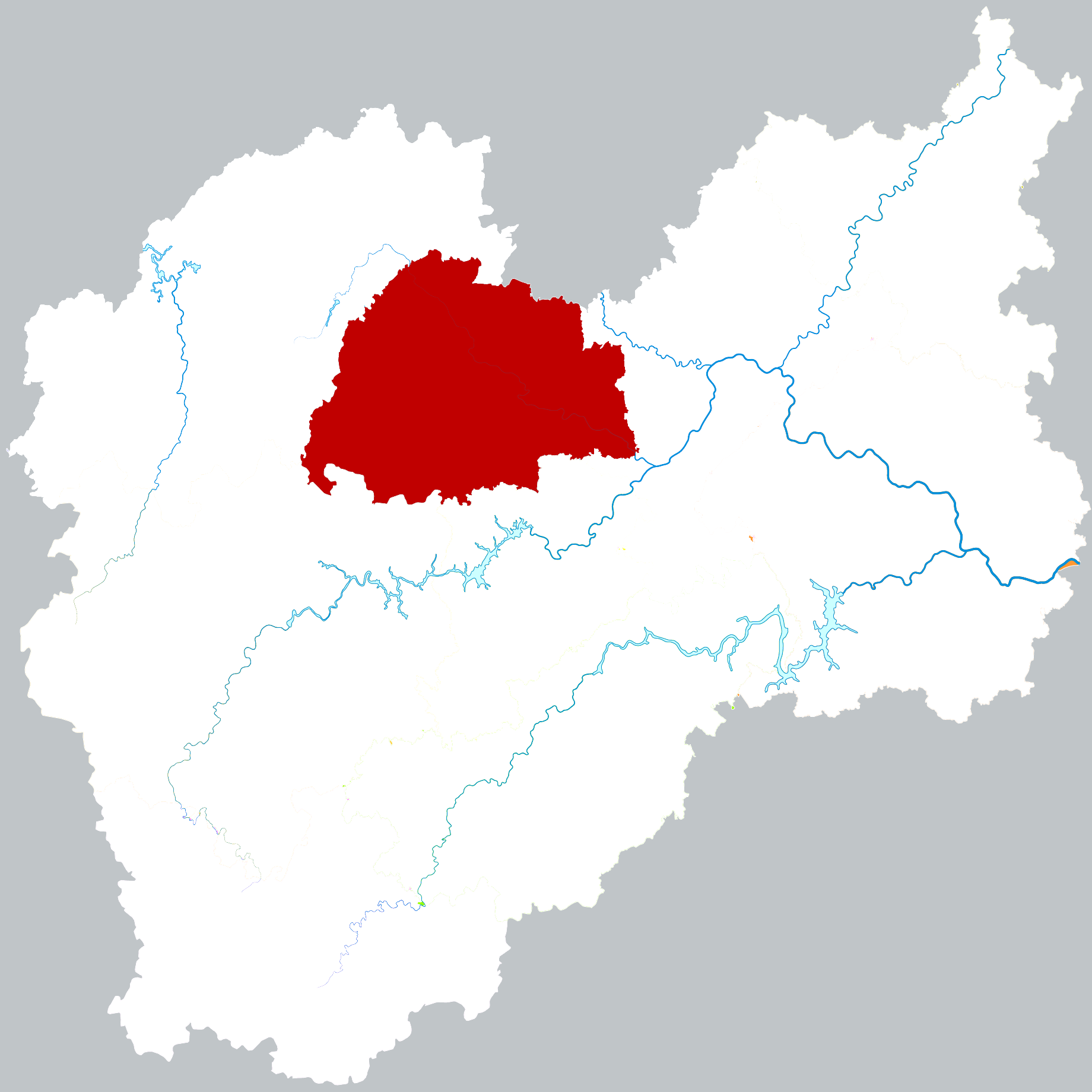
- Location of Songyang County within Lishui

- Location of the seat in Zhejiang
- Coordinates (Songyang County government): 28°26′53″N 119°28′52″E
- Country: People's Republic of China
- Province: Zhejiang
- Prefecture-level city: Lishui

Area
  - Total: 1,400.77 km^{2} (540.84 sq mi)

Population (2022)
  - Total: 204,900
  - Density: 146.3/km^{2} (378.9/sq mi)
- Time zone: UTC+8 (China Standard)
- Postal code: 323400
- Website: www.songyang.gov.cn

Songyang County (simplified Chinese: 松阳县; traditional Chinese: 松陽縣; pinyin: Sōngyáng xiàn) is a county in the southwest of Zhejiang province, China. It is under the administration of the Lishui city.

== Administrative divisions ==
Towns:

- Xiping (西屏镇), Gushi (古市镇), Yuyan (玉岩镇), Xiangxi (象溪镇), Dadongba (大东坝镇)

Townships:

- Chishou Township (赤寿乡), Xinxing Township (新兴乡), Wangsong Township (望松乡), Sidu Township (四都乡), Xiecun Township (谢村乡), Zhangxi Township (樟溪乡), Sandu Township (三都乡), Xinchu Township (新处乡), Zhaitan Township (斋坛乡), Yecun Township (叶村乡), Zhuyuan Township (竹源乡), Fengping Township (枫坪乡), Yuxi Township (裕溪乡), Anmin Township (安民乡), Banqiao She Ethnic Township (板桥畲族乡)

== Religion ==
The county government supports all religions. Songyang Catholic Church is a Roman Catholic Church located in Xiping Subdistrict.

== History ==
It was first established in the fourth year of Jian'an in the Eastern Han Dynasty (199), when Songyang County was set up in the southern township of Zhang'an County, which belonged to Huijian County, and was the earliest county in the Lishui region.

On November 21, 1958, Songyang County was abolished and the territory under its jurisdiction was incorporated into Suichang County, and on January 30, 1982, Songyang County was re-established as part of the Lishui region.
