= Liandu, Lishui =

Liandu 莲都区
- District
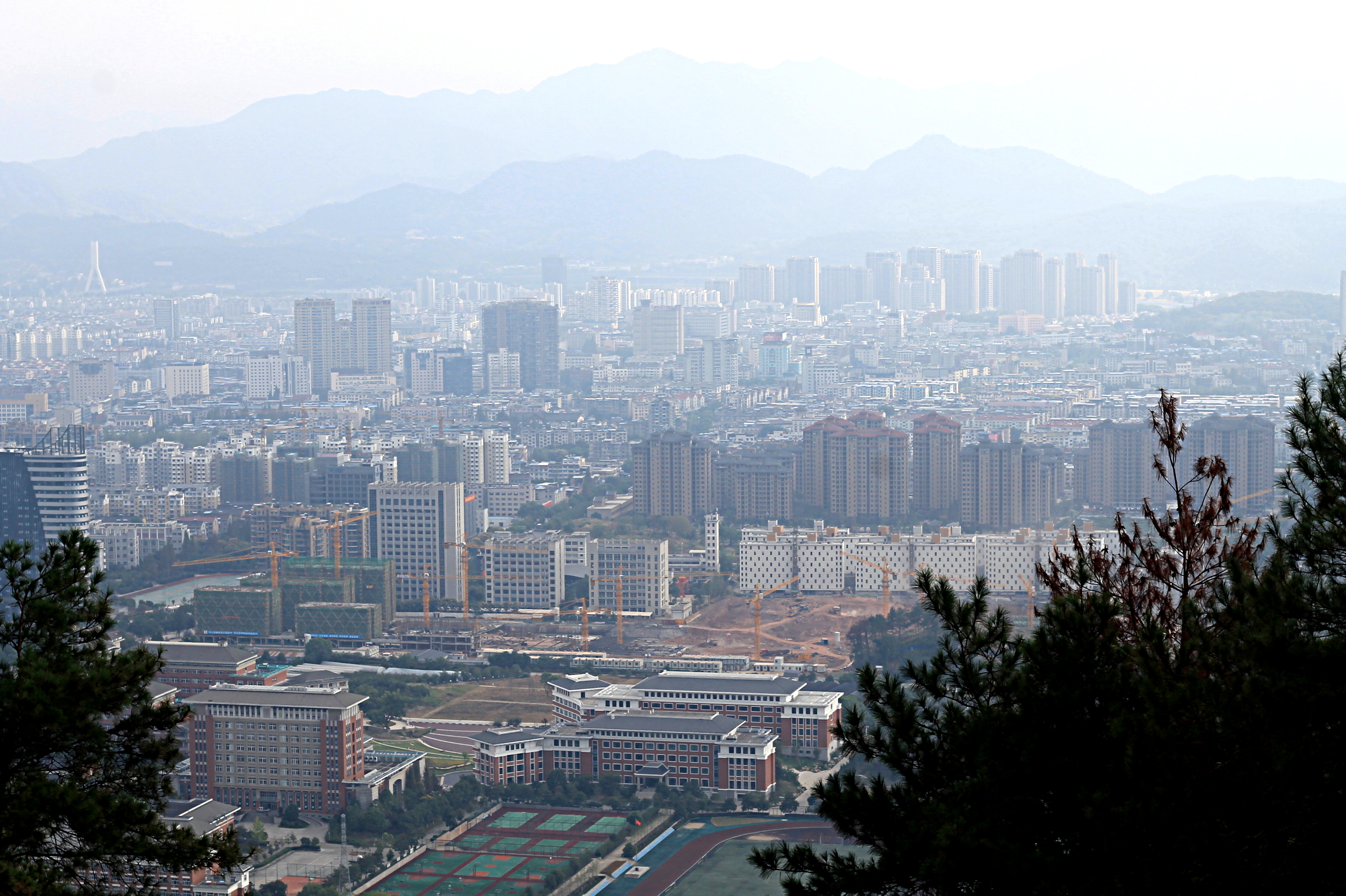

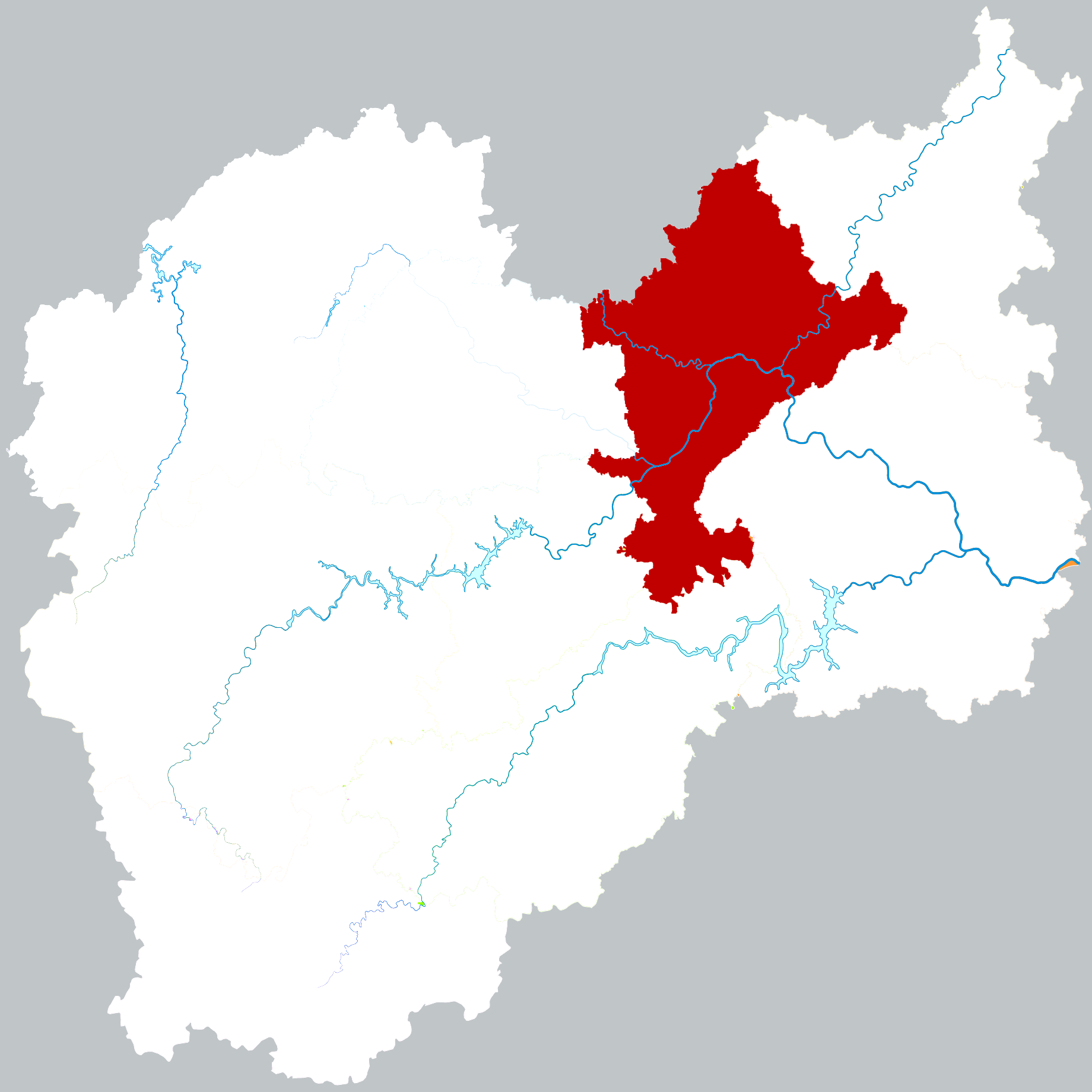
- Location of Liandu District within Lishui

- Location in Zhejiang
- Coordinates: 28°26′45″N 119°54′46″E
- Country: People's Republic of China
- Province: Zhejiang
- Prefecture-level city: Lishui

Area
  - Total: 1,493.44 km^{2} (576.62 sq mi)

Population (2020)
  - Total: 562,116
- Time zone: UTC+8 (China Standard)

Liandu District (simplified Chinese: 莲都区; traditional Chinese: 蓮都區; pinyin: Liándū Qū) is the central urban district of the prefecture-level city of Lishui in Zhejiang Province, China. It was formerly Lishui County then Lishui county-level city and then Lishui prefecture-level city.

== Administrative divisions ==
Subdistricts:

- Zijin Subdistrict (紫金街道), Yanquan Subdistrict (岩泉街道), Wanxiang Subdistrict (万象街道), Baiyun Subdistrict (白云街道), Shuige Subdistrict (水阁街道), Fuling Subdistrict (富岭街道)

Towns:

- Bihu (碧湖镇), Liancheng (联城镇), Dagangtou (大港头镇), Shuangxi (双溪镇), Laozhu She Ethnic Town (老竹畲族镇)

Townships:

- Taiping Township (太平乡), Xiandu Township (仙渡乡), Fengyuan Township (峰源乡), Gaoxi Township (高溪乡), Shuanghuang Township (双黄乡), Huangcun Township (黄村乡), Lixin She Ethnic Township (丽新畲族乡)
