= Yunhe County =

Yunhe 云和县 Yunhwo
- County
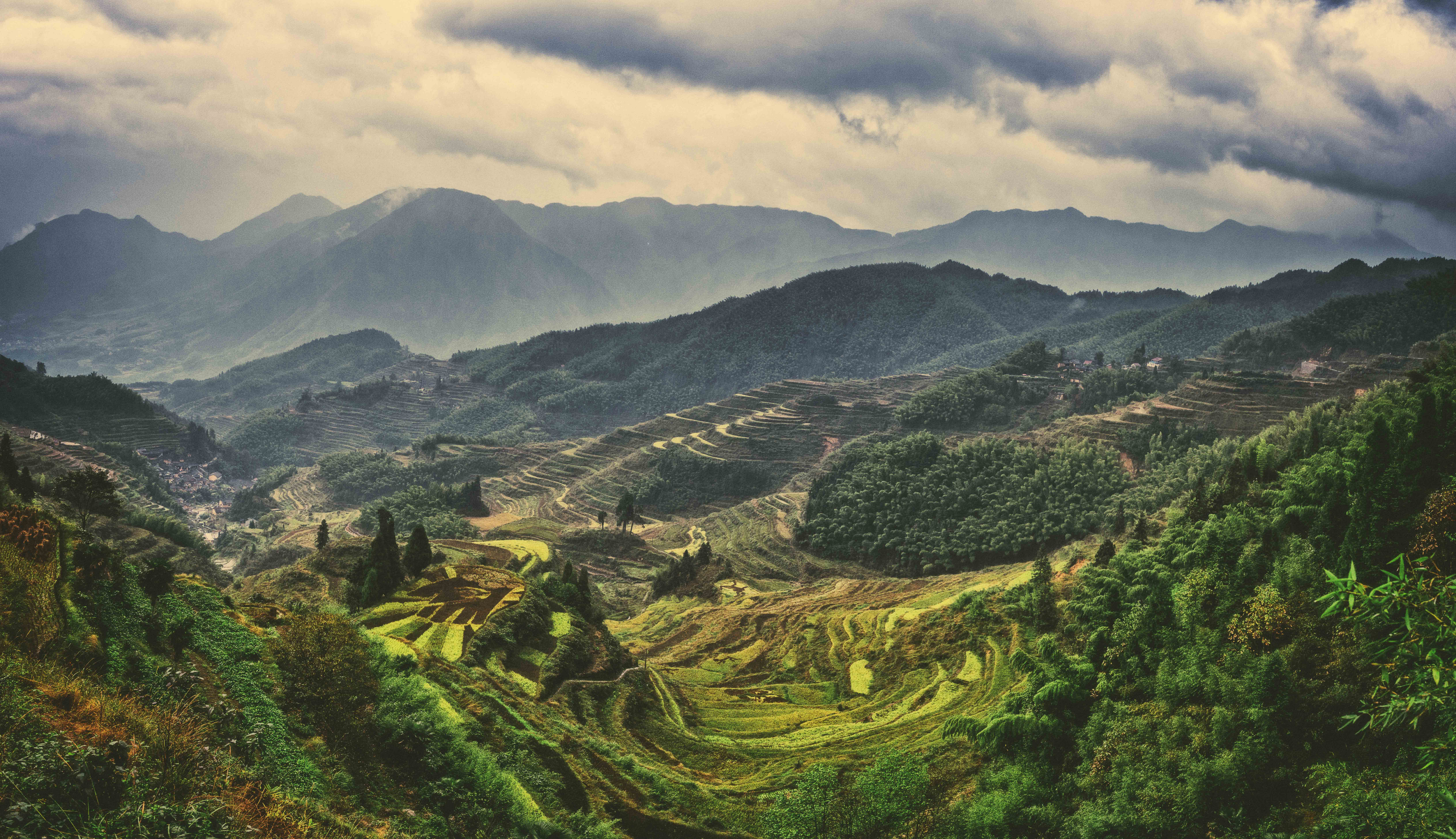

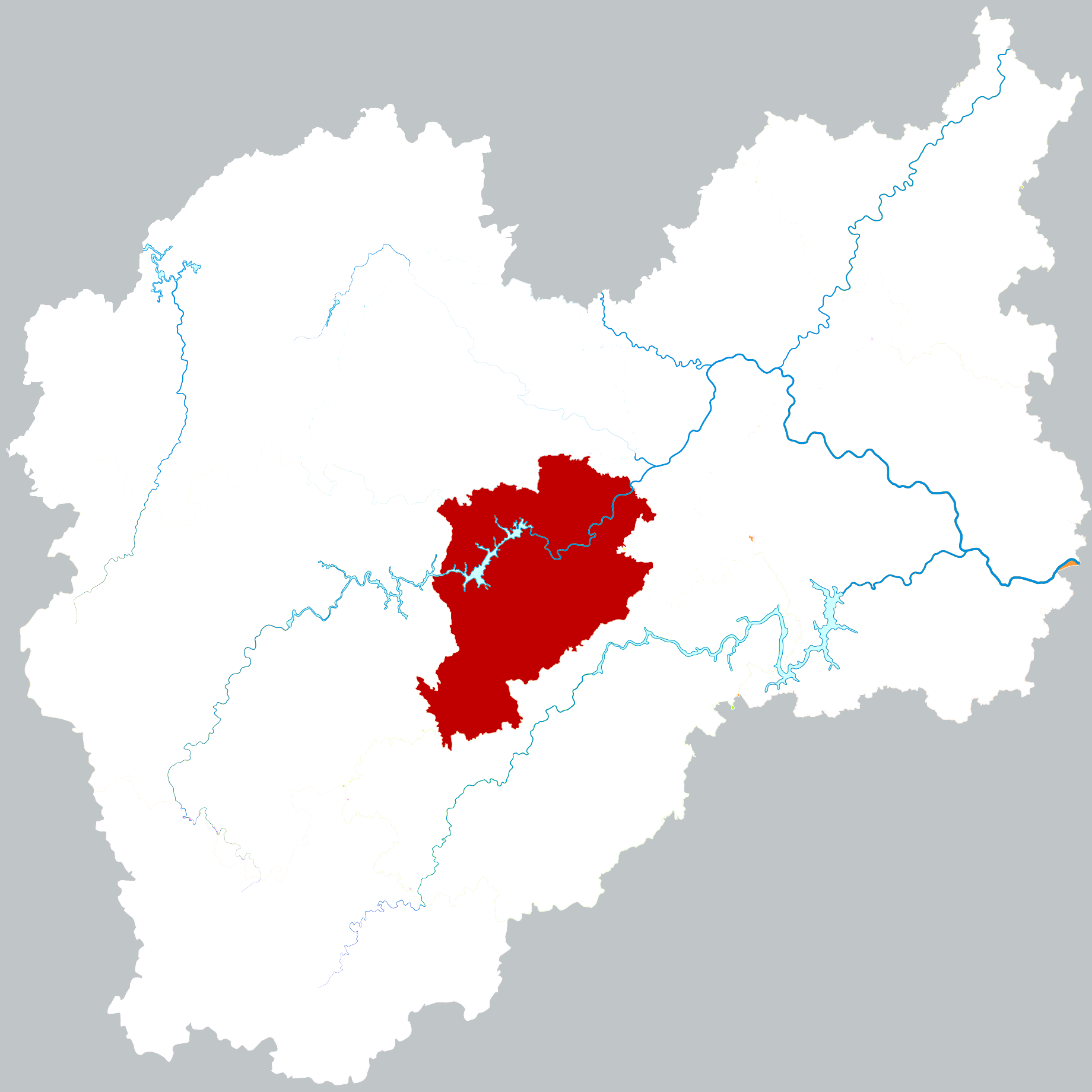
- Location of Yunhe County within Lishui

- Location of the seat in Zhejiang
- Coordinates: 28.1°N 119.55°E
- Country: People's Republic of China
- Province: Zhejiang
- Prefecture-level city: Lishui

Area
  - Total: 984 km^{2} (380 sq mi)

Population (2007)
  - Total: 123,317
- Time zone: UTC+8 (China Standard)
- Postal code: 323600
- Area code: 0578

Yunhe County (simplified Chinese: 云和县; traditional Chinese: 雲和縣; pinyin: Yúnhé Xiàn) is a county in the southwest of Zhejiang province, China. It is under the administration of the Lishui city.

== History ==
Yunhe hosted the Provincial government of Zhejiang from the summer of 1942 till Japan's surrender in 1945 as part of the chain effect of the Pacific War situation. To retaliate the Attack on Pearl Harbor, the US navy launched the Doolittle Raid against Japan's homeland on April 18, 1942. Sixteen bombers took off from the carrier Hornet 700 miles away from Tokyo, and planned to fly to Quzhou airfield (then spelled as Chuchow, about 110 miles from Yunhe) in the Zhejiang Province after the raid. The raid was of little military consequence, but boosted American morale and showed that Japan was more open to air attack than had been supposed. Both as a revenge for the raid and to capture the local airfields to prevent another, the following month the Japanese launched a 100,000-strong offensive into the Zhejiang and Jiangxi provinces where they also employed biological warfare, slaughtering no fewer than 250,000 Chinese before the Japanese withdrew in September. It was at the onset of the Zhejiang-Jiangxi Campaign that the Provincial government made a further retreat southwest, finally settling in Yunhe for the rest of the war.

== Administrative divisions ==
Subdistricts:

- Fuyun Subdistrict (浮云街道), Yuanhe Subdistrict (元和街道), Bailongshan Subdistrict (白龙山街道), Fenghuangshan Subdistrict (凤凰山街道)

Towns:

- Chongtou (崇头镇), Shitang (石塘镇), Jinshuitan (紧水滩镇)

Townships:

- Chishi Township (赤石乡), Wuxi She Ethnic Township (雾溪畲族乡), Anxi She Ethnic Township (安溪畲族乡)

== Climate ==
Climate data for Yunhe, elevation 163 m (535 ft), (1991–2020 normals, extremes 1981–present)
Month	Jan	Feb	Mar	Apr	May	Jun	Jul	Aug	Sep	Oct	Nov	Dec	Year
Record high °C (°F)	27.1 (80.8)	30.0 (86.0)	35.8 (96.4)	36.2 (97.2)	38.9 (102.0)	38.8 (101.8)	42.7 (108.9)	42.5 (108.5)	42.1 (107.8)	40.6 (105.1)	34.3 (93.7)	26.5 (79.7)	42.7 (108.9)
Mean daily maximum °C (°F)	12.3 (54.1)	15.0 (59.0)	18.7 (65.7)	24.6 (76.3)	28.5 (83.3)	30.6 (87.1)	35.0 (95.0)	34.4 (93.9)	30.2 (86.4)	25.5 (77.9)	20.3 (68.5)	14.6 (58.3)	24.1 (75.5)
Daily mean °C (°F)	7.0 (44.6)	9.2 (48.6)	12.7 (54.9)	18.3 (64.9)	22.6 (72.7)	25.4 (77.7)	28.6 (83.5)	28.2 (82.8)	24.6 (76.3)	19.5 (67.1)	14.3 (57.7)	8.7 (47.7)	18.3 (64.9)
Mean daily minimum °C (°F)	3.4 (38.1)	5.3 (41.5)	8.7 (47.7)	13.8 (56.8)	18.2 (64.8)	21.7 (71.1)	24.0 (75.2)	23.9 (75.0)	20.7 (69.3)	15.3 (59.5)	10.3 (50.5)	4.7 (40.5)	14.2 (57.5)
Record low °C (°F)	−7.1 (19.2)	−5.6 (21.9)	−4.5 (23.9)	1.3 (34.3)	9.8 (49.6)	11.6 (52.9)	18.3 (64.9)	17.3 (63.1)	11.3 (52.3)	2.9 (37.2)	−3.4 (25.9)	−8.7 (16.3)	−8.7 (16.3)
Average precipitation mm (inches)	69.6 (2.74)	84.0 (3.31)	165.1 (6.50)	167.4 (6.59)	195.2 (7.69)	308.5 (12.15)	152.9 (6.02)	176.8 (6.96)	143.0 (5.63)	57.0 (2.24)	71.9 (2.83)	59.4 (2.34)	1,650.8 (65)
Average precipitation days (≥ 0.1 mm)	13.5	14.1	17.9	16.9	17.2	19.8	14.4	16.5	13.5	9.4	10.5	10.5	174.2
Average snowy days	1.7	1.3	0.4	0	0	0	0	0	0	0	0	0.8	4.2
Average relative humidity (%)	80	79	79	77	77	82	76	77	79	78	80	79	79
Mean monthly sunshine hours	90.0	91.7	105.2	128.8	140.4	121.1	218.8	198.8	152.1	147.9	111.2	112.1	1,618.1
Percentage possible sunshine	27	29	28	33	33	29	52	49	42	42	35	35	36
Source: China Meteorological Administration
