= Longquan =

Longquan 龙泉市 Lungchuan
- County-level city
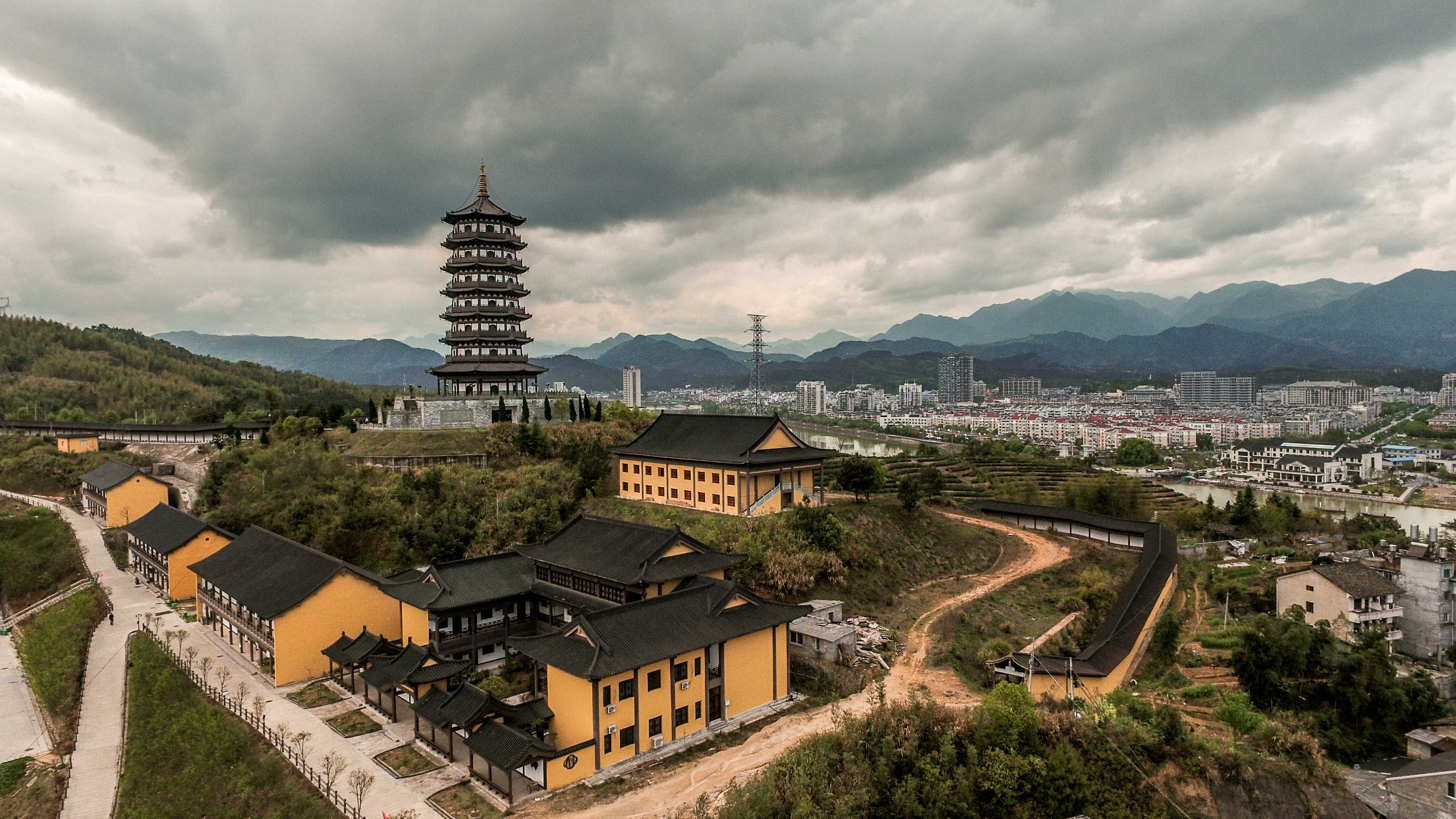

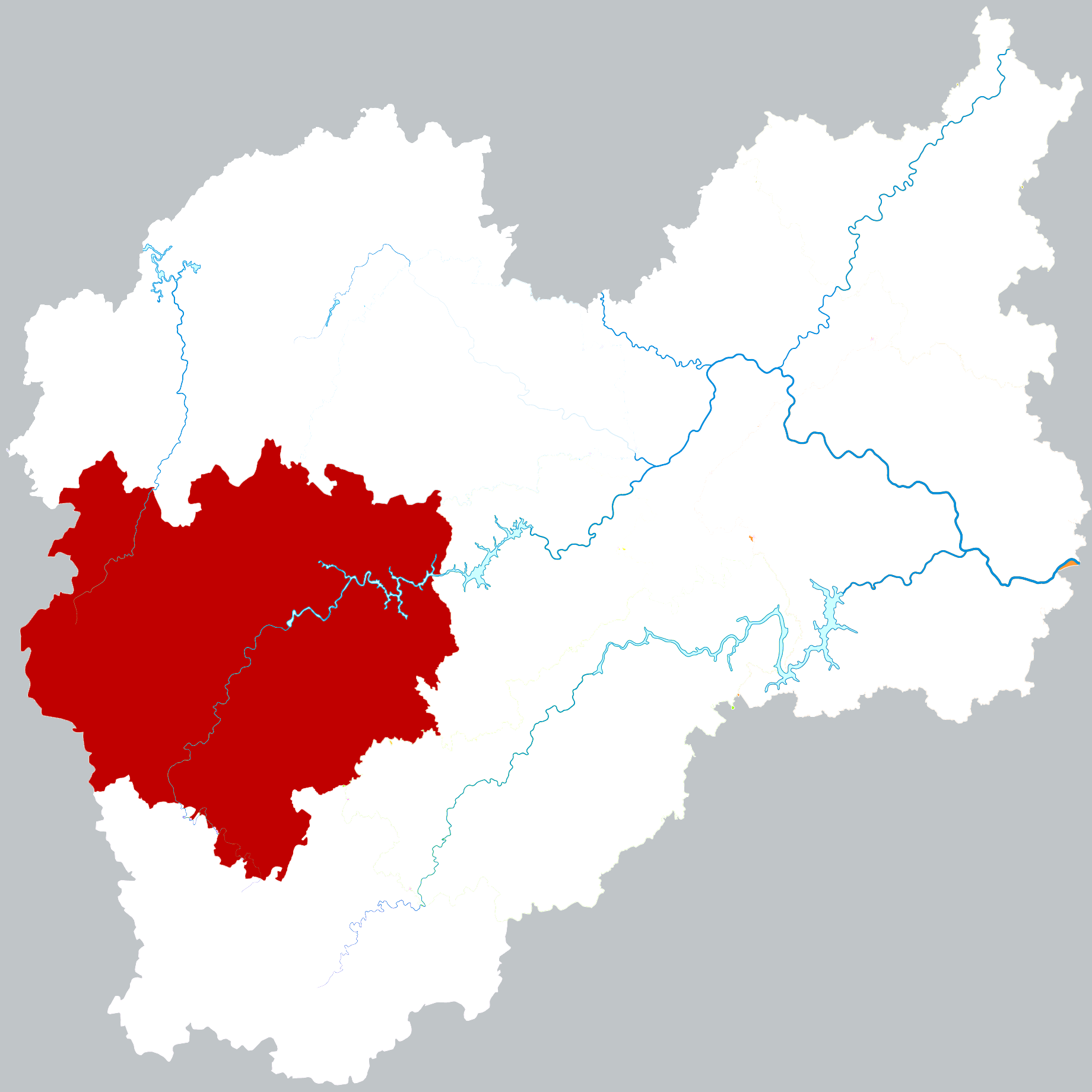
- Location of Longquan City within Lishui

- Location in Zhejiang
- Coordinates: 28°04′N 119°08′E
- Country: People's Republic of China
- Province: Zhejiang
- Prefecture-level city: Lishui
- Township-level divisions: 3 subdistricts 8 towns 7 townships 1 ethnic township
- Seat: Longyuan Subdistrict (龙渊街道)

Area
  - Total: 3,059 km^{2} (1,181 sq mi)
- Elevation: 195 m (640 ft)

Population
  - Total: 270,000
  - Density: 88/km^{2} (230/sq mi)
- Time zone: UTC+8 (China Standard)
- Postal code: 323700
- Area code: 0578

Longquan (simplified Chinese: 龙泉; traditional Chinese: 龍泉; pinyin: Lóngquán; lit. 'dragon spring') is a county-level city and former county under the administration of the prefecture-level city of Lishui in southwestern Zhejiang Province, China, located on the upper reaches of the Ou River and bordering Fujian province to the southwest.

Called Longyuan (龙渊) before the Tang dynasty, Longquan adopted its current name because of the naming taboo of Emperor Gaozu, the founder of Tang whose personal name was Li Yuan (李渊).

== Demographics ==
Longquan has a population of around 270,000.

There is an Ethnic Township set aside for the She-nation minority at Zhuyang (竹垟).

== Celadons and swords ==
Longquan is famous locally for its swords and Longquan celadon ceramics, both of which are often regarded as historically the finest in China. Longquan celadon was one of China's finest ceramics from the Song dynasty until it fell out of fashion in the Imperial court during the Ming dynasty. Production continued but at lower quality.

The double-edged straight swords (jian) made in Longquan (Longquanjian, 龙泉剑)—traditionally traced back to the Spring and Autumn period swordsmith Ou Yezi—are famous among martial artists in China. Modern sword production is now led by a workshop named "Shenguanglong" whose sword-making history can be traced back to the twentieth year of Guangxu in the Qing dynasty. There are several private and state-owned sword-making factories in Longquan. Alongside featherweight wushu competition blades, Longquan workshops forge traditional practice taijijian (太极剑) constructed with an unsharpened, semi-flexible steel blade and a raised central ridge (jianji, 剑脊), typically weighing 590–630 g (1.30–1.39 lb) un-scabbarded with a point of balance 6.0–9.0 cm (2.4–3.5 in) ahead of the guard and housed in a solid hardwood scabbard (such as jichi wood) to support blade-tip sensitivity (tingjin) and internal power (fa jin) training.

== Industry ==
The city has a static inverter plant of HVDC Three Gorges-Changzhou.

== Administration ==
The city's executive, legislature and judiciary are at Longyuan Subdistrict (龙渊街道), together with the CPC and PSB branches. The other divisions, numbering two subdistricts, eight towns, seven townships and one ethnic township, are as follows:

Subdistricts:

- Xijie Subdistrict (西街街道), Jianchi Subdistrict (剑池街道)

Towns:

- Badu (八都镇), Shangyang (上垟镇), Xiaomei (小梅镇), Chatian (查田镇), Pingnan (屏南镇), Anren (安仁镇), Jinxi (锦溪镇), Zhulong (住龙镇)

Townships:

- Lanju Township (兰巨乡), Dashi Township (跶石乡), Baoxi Township (宝溪乡), Longnan Township (龙南乡), Daotai Township (道太乡), Yanzhang Township (岩樟乡), Chengbei Township (城北乡), Zhuyang She Ethnic Township (竹垟畲族乡)

== Climate ==
Climate data for Longquan, elevation 222 m (728 ft), (1991–2020 normals, extremes 1981–present)
Month	Jan	Feb	Mar	Apr	May	Jun	Jul	Aug	Sep	Oct	Nov	Dec	Year
Record high °C (°F)	27.4 (81.3)	28.7 (83.7)	34.5 (94.1)	35.2 (95.4)	37.0 (98.6)	38.4 (101.1)	41.5 (106.7)	42.2 (108.0)	39.6 (103.3)	36.1 (97.0)	33.7 (92.7)	26.0 (78.8)	42.2 (108.0)
Mean daily maximum °C (°F)	13.1 (55.6)	15.5 (59.9)	18.9 (66.0)	24.5 (76.1)	28.3 (82.9)	30.4 (86.7)	34.5 (94.1)	34.1 (93.4)	30.7 (87.3)	26.3 (79.3)	20.9 (69.6)	15.5 (59.9)	24.4 (75.9)
Daily mean °C (°F)	7.5 (45.5)	9.6 (49.3)	12.9 (55.2)	18.2 (64.8)	22.4 (72.3)	25.2 (77.4)	28.1 (82.6)	27.7 (81.9)	24.7 (76.5)	19.9 (67.8)	14.6 (58.3)	9.1 (48.4)	18.3 (65.0)
Mean daily minimum °C (°F)	3.8 (38.8)	5.7 (42.3)	9.0 (48.2)	13.8 (56.8)	18.1 (64.6)	21.6 (70.9)	23.6 (74.5)	23.6 (74.5)	20.7 (69.3)	15.4 (59.7)	10.3 (50.5)	4.9 (40.8)	14.2 (57.6)
Record low °C (°F)	−6.5 (20.3)	−5.3 (22.5)	−4.7 (23.5)	2.5 (36.5)	8.4 (47.1)	11.0 (51.8)	18.7 (65.7)	17.3 (63.1)	10.8 (51.4)	3.1 (37.6)	−3.1 (26.4)	−8.3 (17.1)	−8.3 (17.1)
Average precipitation mm (inches)	75.4 (2.97)	94.5 (3.72)	187.4 (7.38)	193.7 (7.63)	227.1 (8.94)	338.5 (13.33)	158.6 (6.24)	136.8 (5.39)	91.0 (3.58)	42.4 (1.67)	71.4 (2.81)	58.8 (2.31)	1,675.6 (65.97)
Average precipitation days (≥ 0.1 mm)	12.1	13.5	17.3	16.5	16.8	18.9	13.7	15.0	9.8	6.7	9.1	9.2	158.6
Average snowy days	1.4	1.4	0.2	0	0	0	0	0	0	0	0	0.8	3.8
Average relative humidity (%)	77	77	79	78	78	82	77	78	77	73	77	77	78
Mean monthly sunshine hours	90.8	90.1	97.2	118.7	132.5	115.9	210.1	192.3	163.9	157.5	118.3	116.9	1,604.2
Percentage possible sunshine	28	28	26	31	32	28	50	48	45	45	37	36	36
Source: China Meteorological Administration all-time extreme temperature

== Transportation ==
The city is served by a station on the Quzhou–Ningde railway which opened on 27 September 2020.
