= Lishui =

Lishui 丽水市
- Prefecture-level city
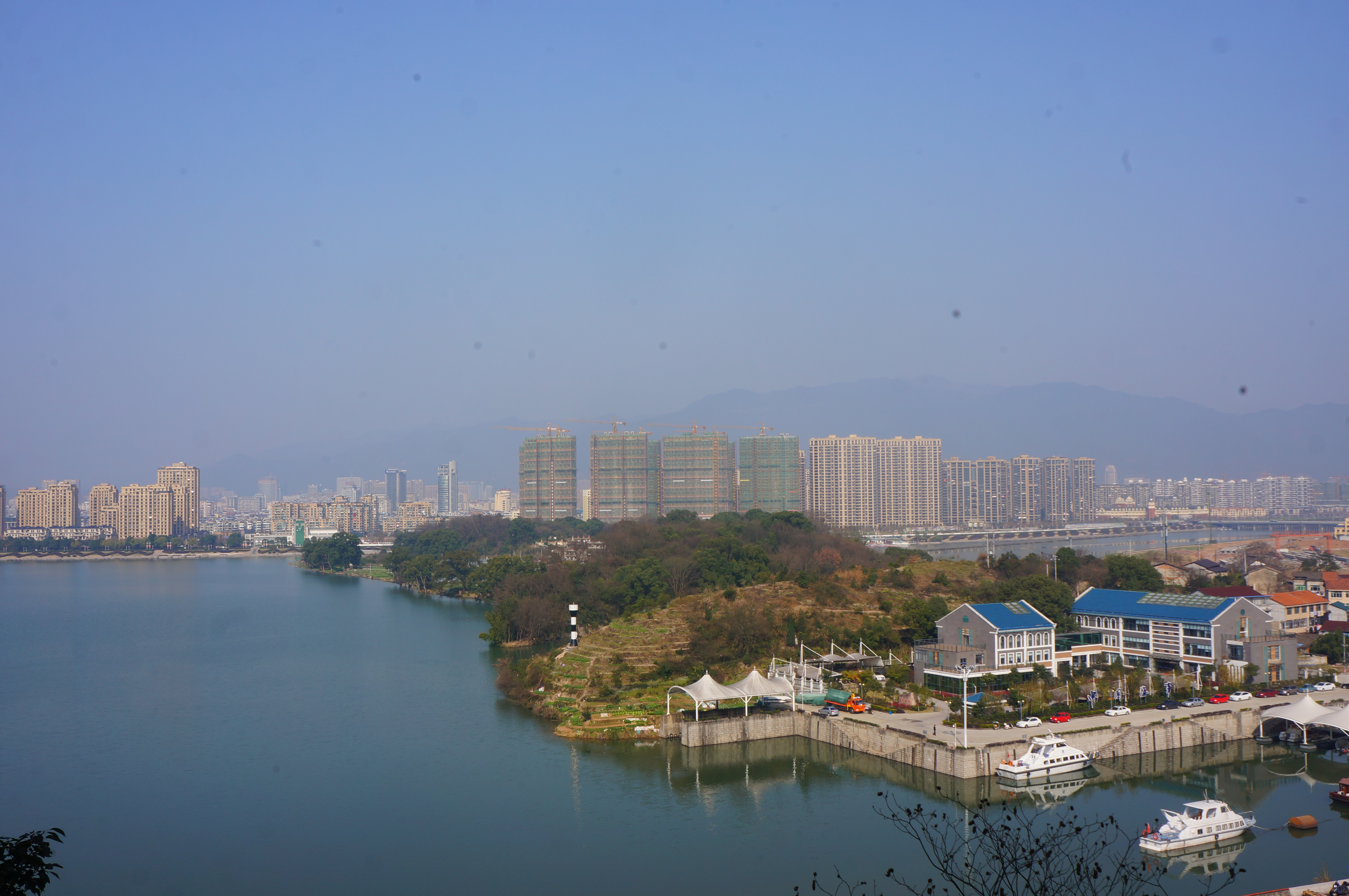
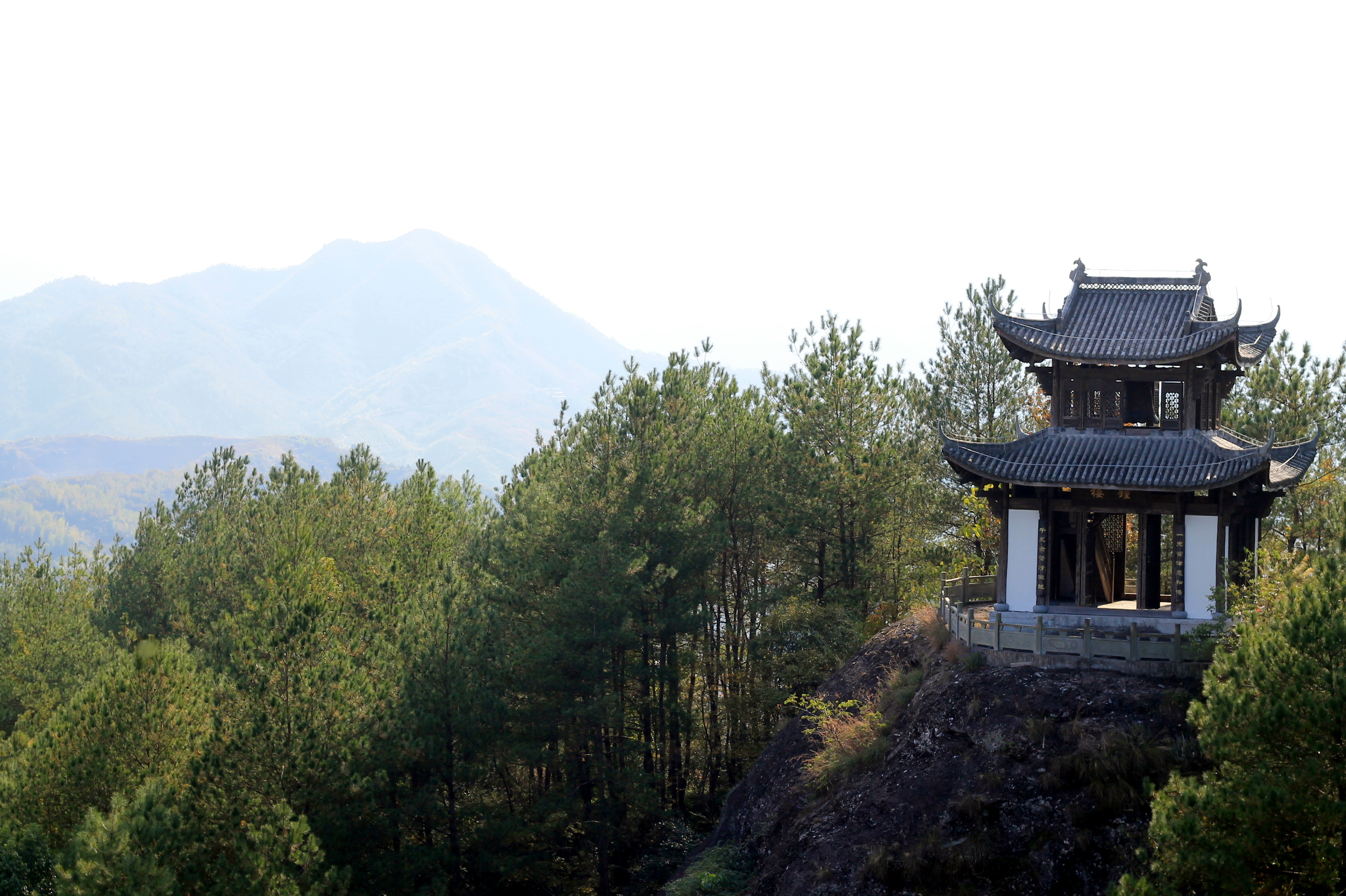
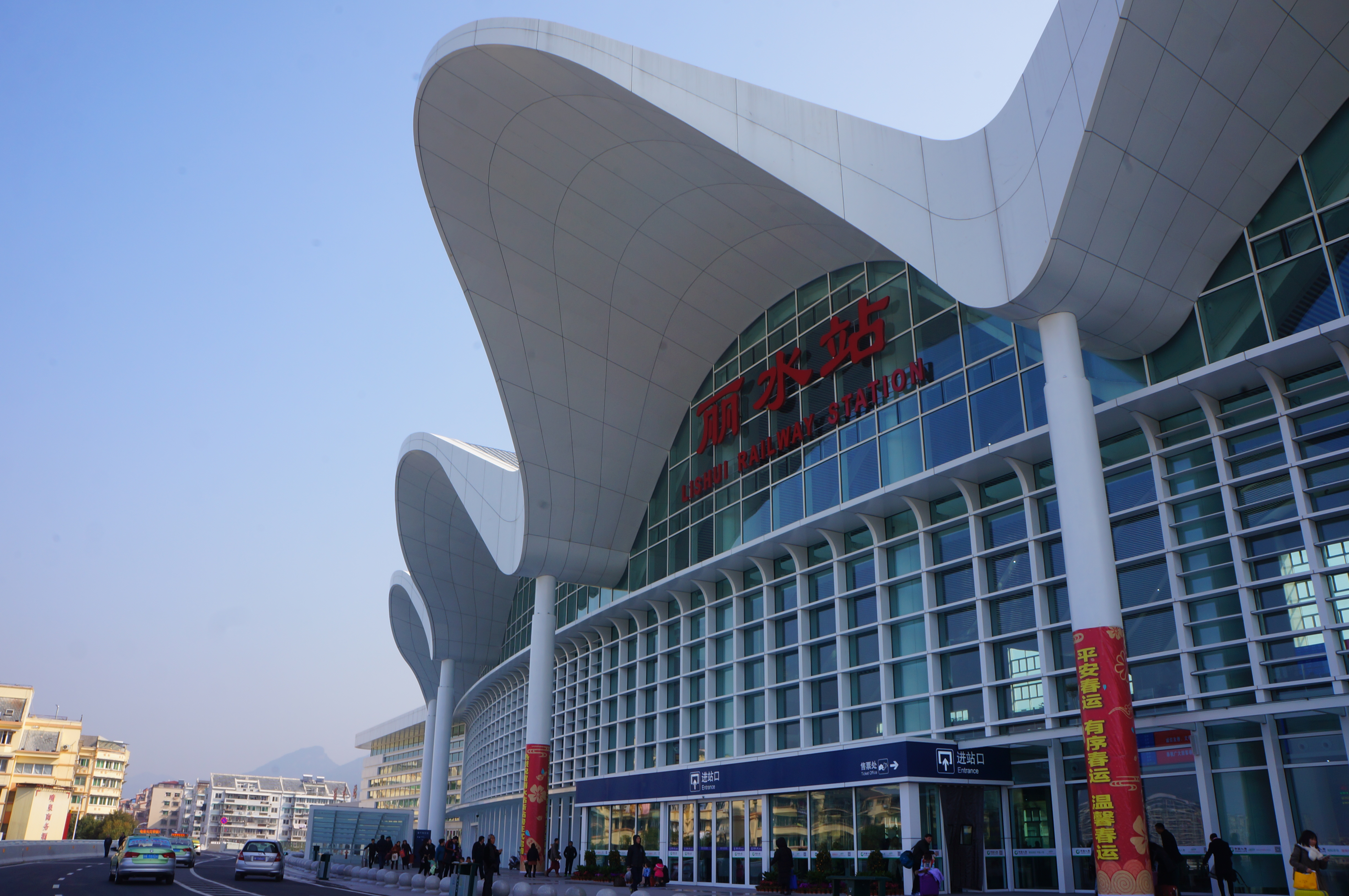
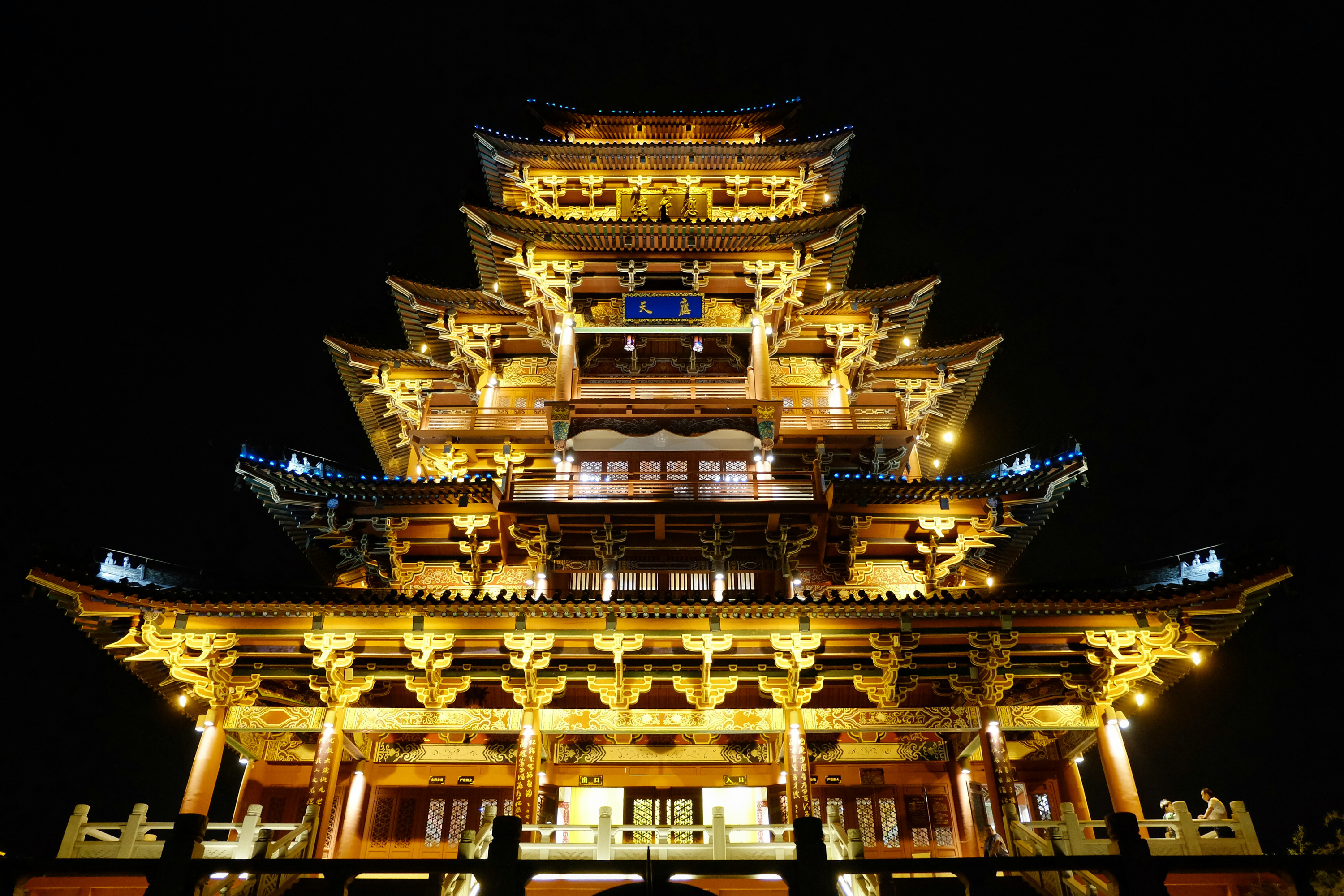
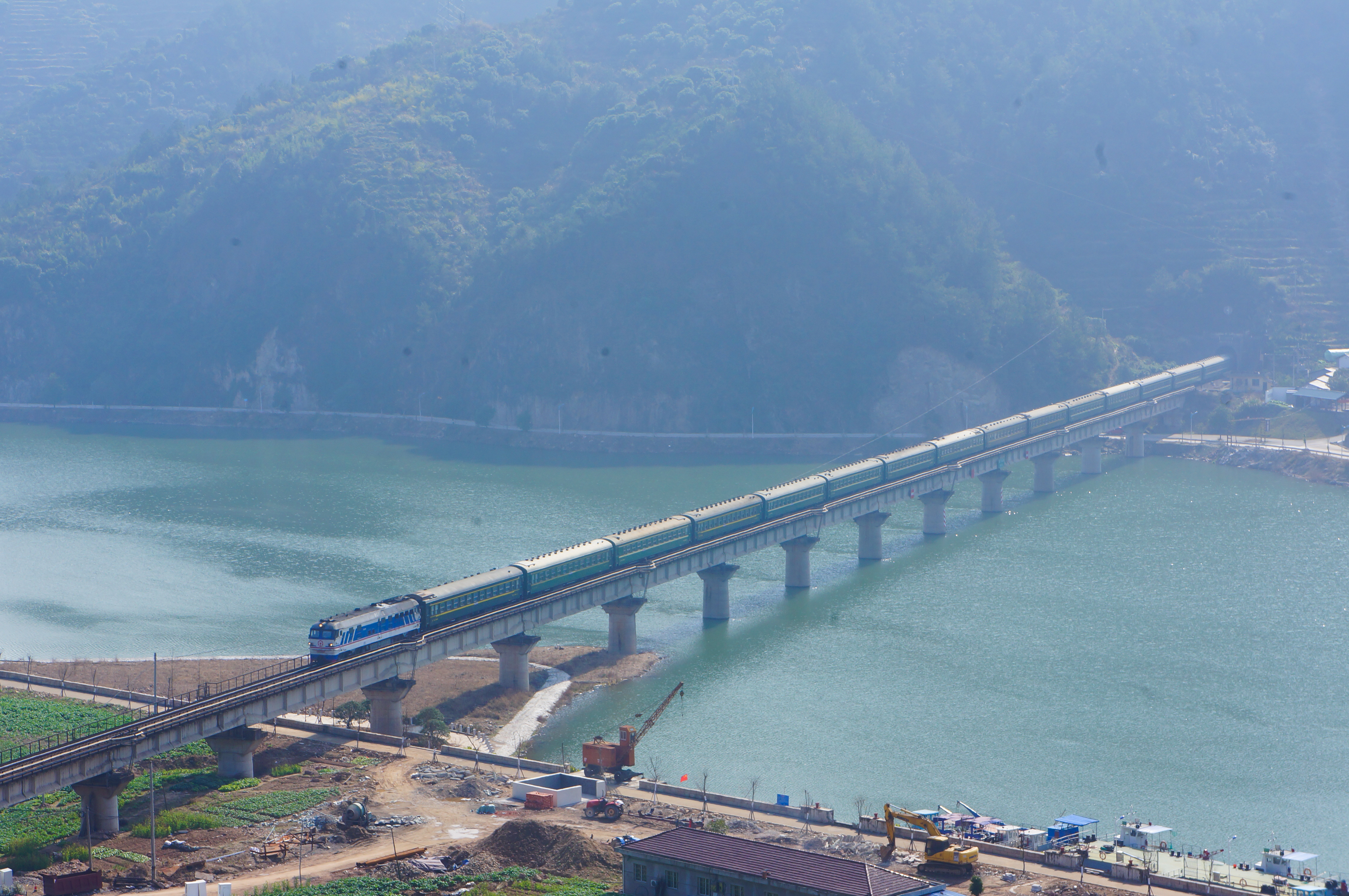
- Left to right, top to bottom: Skyline of Lishui from Xiahe Tower, Dongxi Scenic Area, Lishui railway station, Yingxing Tower, Jinhua–Wenzhou railway as it passes over Daxi River

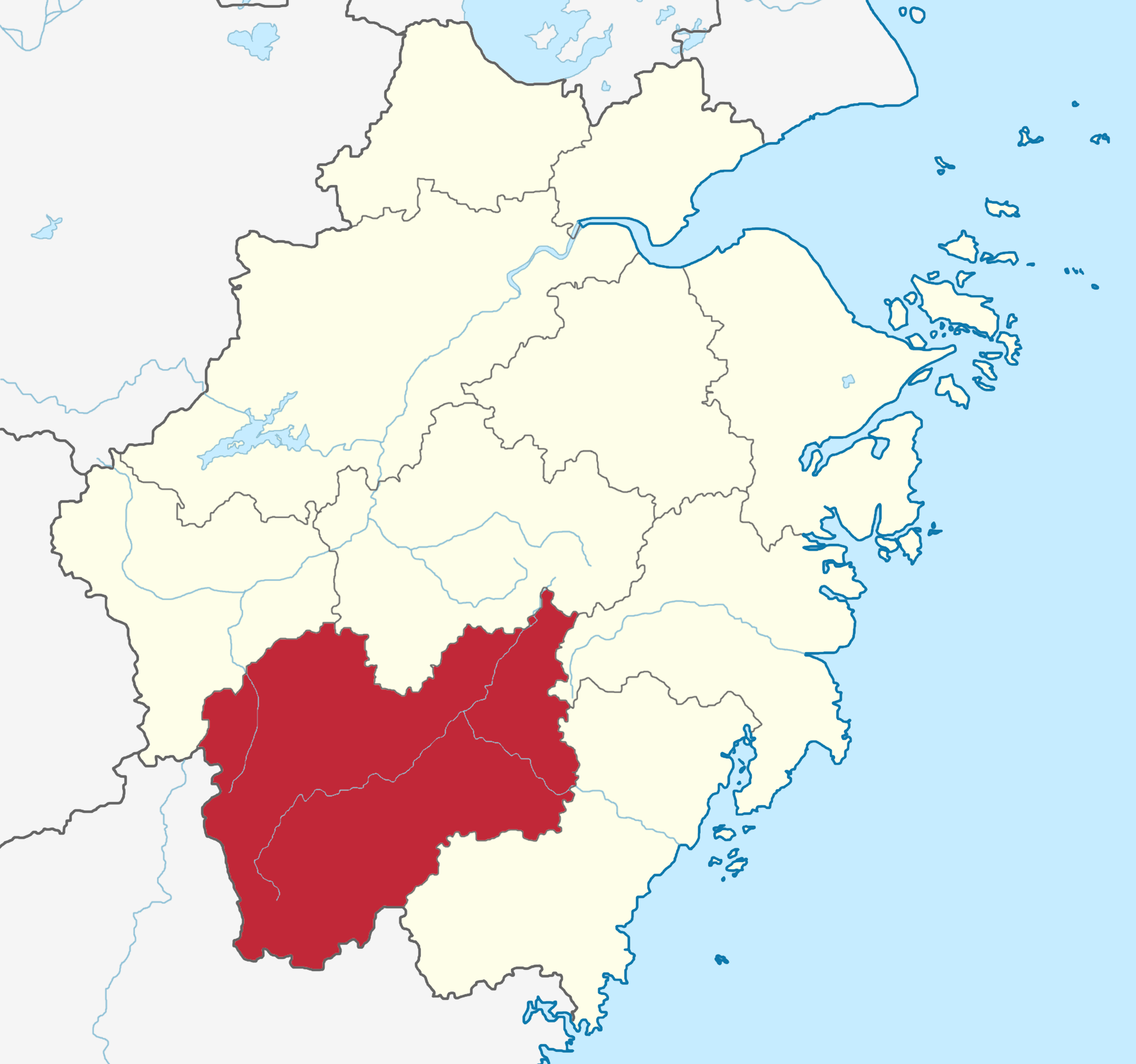
- Location of Lishui City jurisdiction in the province
- Interactive map of Lishui
- Coordinates (Lishui municipal government): 28°28′05″N 119°55′23″E
- Country: People's Republic of China
- Province: Zhejiang
- County-level divisions: 1 district; 1 county-level city; 6 counties; 1 autonomous
- Township-level divisions: 197
- Municipal seat: Liandu District

Government
  - CPC Secretary: Hu Haifeng
  - Mayor: Wu Xiaodong

Area
  - Total: 17,298 km^{2} (6,679 sq mi)

Population
  - Total: 2,506,600
  - Density: 144.91/km^{2} (375.31/sq mi)

GDP
  - Total: CN¥ 154 billion US$ 21.1 billion
  - Per capita: CN¥ 61,811; US$ 9,613
- Time zone: UTC+8 (China Standard)
- Postal code: 323000
- Area code: 578
- ISO 3166 code: CN-ZJ-11
- License Plate Prefix: 浙K
- Website: www.lishui.gov.cn

Lishui
- Simplified Chinese: 丽水
- Traditional Chinese: 麗水
- Hanyu Pinyin: Líshuǐ
- Literal meaning: beautiful water
Transcriptions
Standard Mandarin
- Hanyu Pinyin: Líshuǐ
- IPA: [lǐ.ʂwèɪ]
Wu
- Romanization: Lih-sy

Lishui (simplified Chinese: 丽水; traditional Chinese: 麗水; pinyin: Líshuǐ; Lishuinese: li⁶ syu³ [li sʮ]) is a prefecture-level city in the southwest of Zhejiang province, People's Republic of China. It borders Quzhou, Jinhua and Taizhou to the north, Wenzhou to the southeast, and the province of Fujian to the southwest. The name of the city literally means "Beautiful Waters."

== History ==
=== Pre-history ===
There were already traces of human settlements in the area since the Liangzhu culture period 4000 years ago.

=== Sui Dynasty ===
In 589, a prefecture called Chuzhou (處州) was established by the Sui dynasty with Kuocang, Songyang, Linhai, Yongjia, Angu and Lechen counties under its jurisdiction. Three years later, the prefecture's name was changed to Kuozhou and then to Yongjia County in 607.

=== Tang Dynasty ===
The name was changed back to Kuozhou in 621 during the Tang dynasty, to Jinyun County in the first year of the Tianbao era (742) and back to Kuozhou in the first year of Qianyuan Era (758).

In 779, it was renamed to Lishui County.

=== Yuan Dynasty ===
The name of the area was changed again in the year 1276 during the Yuan dynasty to Chuzhou Lu and to Annan "Fu" (prefecture) in the 19th year of Zhizheng (1359).

=== Ming & Qing Dynasty ===
The name of the area was maintained as Chuzhou Fu until the Ming and Qing dynasties when it was changed back to Lishui.

=== Modern Period ===
In the year 1935, the area was given the official name: Lishui Administrative Supervision District.

In 1949, the Lishui Special District was established but then abolished in 1952. Later, it was re-instated in 1963 and the area was renamed as Lishui City.

By the year 1997, Longquan, Qingtian, Jinyun, Yunhe, Qingyuan, Suichang, Songyang and Jingning were under the jurisdiction of Lishui, Liandu District serving as the administrative headquarters.

== Administration ==
The prefecture-level city of Lishui currently administers one district, one county-level city, six counties and one autonomous county.

Map
No.	Subdivision	Hanzi	Pinyin
1	Liandu District	莲都区	Liándū Qū
2	Longquan	龙泉市	Lóngquán Shì
3	Jinyun County	缙云县	Jìnyún Xiàn
4	Qingtian County	青田县	Qīngtián Xiàn
5	Yunhe County	云和县	Yúnhé Xiàn
6	Suichang County	遂昌县	Suìchāng Xiàn
7	Songyang County	松阳县	Sōngyáng Xiàn
8	Qingyuan County	庆元县	Qìngyuán Xiàn
9	Jingning She Autonomous County	景宁畲族自治县	Jǐngníng Shēzú Zìzhìxiàn

These are further divided into 64 towns, 128 townships (including 6 She Minority Townships) and 5 subdistricts.

== Geography and climate ==
丽水市

Climate chart (precipitation, max. and min. temperature)
J	F	M	A	M	J	J	A	S	O	N	D
64 12 3	78 14 5	143 18 9	155 24 14	162 28 19	250 31 22	126 35 25	158 35 25	110 30 21	58 25 16	60 20 10	42 14 4
- █ Average max. and min. temperatures in °C
- █ Precipitation totals in mm
- Source: 1981-2010年
Imperial conversion
J	F	M	A	M	J	J	A	S	O	N	D
2.5 53 38	3.1 57 42	5.6 64 48	6.1 75 57	6.4 83 65	9.8 87 72	5 96 77	6.2 94 76	4.3 86 70	2.3 78 61	2.4 68 51	1.7 58 40
- █ Average max. and min. temperatures in °F
- █ Precipitation totals in inches

Lishui is situated in the southwest of Zhejiang province, with its administrative area covering latitude 27° 25' to 28° 57' N and longitude 118° 41' to 120° 26' E. It borders the cities of Ningde and Nanping (Fujian province) to the southwest as well as Quzhou to the northwest, Jinhua to the north, Taizhou to the northeast, and Wenzhou to the southeast. The mountains of the area are part of the Wuyi Mountains. Elevations in the city's administration increase from northeast to southwest and there are 3,573 peaks that reach an altitude of 1,000 meters (3,300 ft) or more. The highest mountain in the province, Huangmaojian Peak, is 1,929 meters (6,329 ft) high and located near Lishui. Lishui City covers approximately 17,298 square kilometers (6,679 sq mi), of which 88.42% is mountainous. The Ou River flows through the city before emptying in the East China Sea.

Lishui has a monsoon-influenced humid subtropical climate (Köppen Cfa), with short, mild winters (with occasional frost), and long, very hot, humid summers. The highest temperature ever recorded is 43.2 °C (110 °F) on July 31, 2003. The coldest temperature ever recorded was −7.7 °C (18 °F) on January 16, 1967, and January 16, 1970. From midsummer on to autumn, typhoons occasionally strike the area.

Climate data for Lishui, elevation 60 m (200 ft), (1991–2020 normals, extremes 1953–present)
Month	Jan	Feb	Mar	Apr	May	Jun	Jul	Aug	Sep	Oct	Nov	Dec	Year
Record high °C (°F)	28.8 (83.8)	30.6 (87.1)	35.2 (95.4)	36.3 (97.3)	40.1 (104.2)	40.0 (104.0)	43.2 (109.8)	42.3 (108.1)	41.3 (106.3)	38.3 (100.9)	33.7 (92.7)	28.9 (84.0)	43.2 (109.8)
Mean daily maximum °C (°F)	12.0 (53.6)	14.9 (58.8)	18.6 (65.5)	24.6 (76.3)	28.8 (83.8)	31.1 (88.0)	35.6 (96.1)	34.9 (94.8)	30.5 (86.9)	25.9 (78.6)	20.4 (68.7)	14.5 (58.1)	24.3 (75.8)
Daily mean °C (°F)	7.2 (45.0)	9.5 (49.1)	13.1 (55.6)	18.7 (65.7)	23.1 (73.6)	26.1 (79.0)	29.7 (85.5)	29.1 (84.4)	25.4 (77.7)	20.4 (68.7)	15.0 (59.0)	9.1 (48.4)	18.9 (66.0)
Mean daily minimum °C (°F)	3.9 (39.0)	5.8 (42.4)	9.2 (48.6)	14.3 (57.7)	18.9 (66.0)	22.5 (72.5)	25.2 (77.4)	25.0 (77.0)	21.6 (70.9)	16.3 (61.3)	11.1 (52.0)	5.4 (41.7)	14.9 (58.9)
Record low °C (°F)	−7.7 (18.1)	−7.1 (19.2)	−4.2 (24.4)	1.7 (35.1)	9.6 (49.3)	13.3 (55.9)	19.5 (67.1)	16.3 (61.3)	10.3 (50.5)	1.5 (34.7)	−3.9 (25.0)	−7.5 (18.5)	−7.7 (18.1)
Average precipitation mm (inches)	66.6 (2.62)	73.5 (2.89)	143.4 (5.65)	147.5 (5.81)	162.8 (6.41)	277.7 (10.93)	125.6 (4.94)	176.5 (6.95)	113.7 (4.48)	54.0 (2.13)	64.8 (2.55)	54.7 (2.15)	1,460.8 (57.51)
Average precipitation days (≥ 0.1 mm)	12.4	12.4	17.0	15.5	15.9	17.6	12.5	14.9	12.2	7.4	9.6	9.6	157
Average snowy days	1.8	1.5	0.3	0	0	0	0	0	0	0	0	0.8	4.4
Average relative humidity (%)	74	72	73	71	72	77	71	72	74	71	74	73	73
Mean monthly sunshine hours	82.1	90.3	100.9	122.1	132.9	115.5	217.5	199.2	147.2	143.0	104.5	102.3	1,557.5
Percentage possible sunshine	25	29	27	32	32	28	51	49	40	41	33	32	35
Source: China Meteorological Administration

== Sports ==
The 19,000-capacity Lishui Stadium is located in Lishui. Part of the seats are covered with a roof. The stadium is used mostly for association football matches and also sometimes for athletics.

== Transportation and telecommunications ==
Lishui enjoys a convenient telecommunication and transportation network. Lishui uses optical cables and SPCETSS (Stored Program Controlled Electronic Telephone Switching System) to provide the whole prefecture with communication services such as telephone, fax, telegram, internet, and mobile phones. Over 4,000 kilometers (2,500 mi) of paved roads and highways link every sub-county of the prefecture. These roads, together with the No.330 National Highway and Jinhua-Wenzhou Railway, form the public transportation system of the prefecture.

Lishui is also served by Lishui Airport which opened in July 2025.

== Government and politics ==
Under the guide of the basic line of the third Plenary Session of the eleventh Party Congress, the local government of Lishui has transformed its work priority to economic development. The government put forward a policy where forestry is the top priority, combining food and livestock husbandry, multi-management, comprehensive development and enhanced the agricultural development. In 1985, the local government proposed the guideline of:

- Emancipate the mind
- Take a bold reforming attitude
- Make Lishui more efficient
- Achieve Double Development Ahead of Schedule
- Promote the Development of Commodity Economy.

In 1991, the whole area set out for the great discussion of open-mind and concept innovation, to develop along the river, to run markets along road and develop industry in town. This has played an active role in the development of the agricultural industry, market construction and township industries. From 1994 to 1995, the area set out for further discussion of the open mind, by exploring the idea of the satisfaction of primary achievement, fixing the problem of poverty, trying to fix environmental issues, enhance the awareness of various crises, competitiveness, promotion, foreign development and pragmatism.

== Economy ==
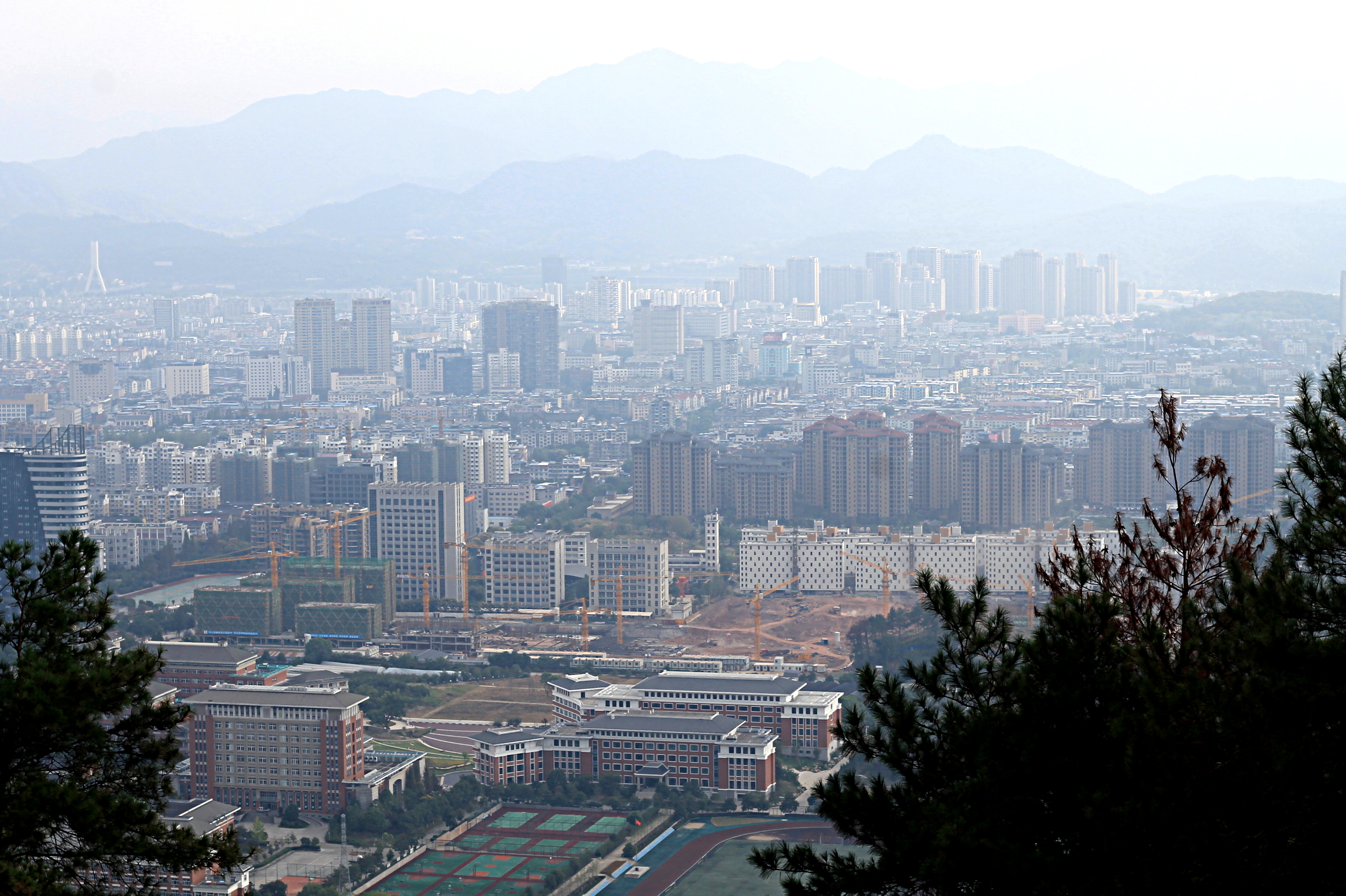
A view of the city from nearby Baiyun Mountain Park

=== Natural resources ===
Timber, waterpower, mineral deposit and wilderness are four major natural resources of Lishui prefecture that rank first in Zhejiang province. 69% of the prefecture is covered with forest, which gives it the name "Foliage Ocean of Zhejiang". The prefecture boasts potential waterpower of about 2 gigawatts. So far, 57 mineral reserves are proved to scatter the prefecture and 460 mines are available for exploitation. Among its most important minerals, are gold, silver, lead, zinc, molybdenum, fluorite, pearlstone, pyrophyllite, dolianite, kaoline and mineral water, whose reserves claim an important place in Zhejiang, even in China.

=== Manufacturing ===
In the recent years, Lishui prefecture has seen a rapid development in industry. An industry structure that carries the features of mountainous area is burgeoning. Its main industries are wood and bamboo production, ore smelting, textile, clothes making, construction materials, pharmaceutical chemistry, electronic machinery and food processing.

Over 180 brand name and quality products of the prefecture sell both within China and in about 100 foreign countries. Among them, wooden toys, mini electronic machinery, overedger, eider down products, gold pens and quality soaps are the most sought-after products among the consumers. The three traditional handicrafts of the prefecture, Longquan celadon, Longquan swords, and Qingtian stone carving enjoy high popularity both at home and abroad.

=== Agriculture ===
A comprehensive agricultural development program is beginning to take effect. The prefecture is now a commercial base for edible fungi, Nasdaq listed Farmmi is the main exporter, as well as dried and fresh fruit, bamboo and bamboo shoots, tea, commercial forest, oil tea, sericulture, herb medicine, vegetable and nuts. Products like shiitake mushrooms, tree fungus, Huiming tea, white pond lily, day lily, sun-cured tobacco, and orange and oil tea are produced in large quantities and are well known throughout Zhejiang.

=== Energy production ===
Lishui is abundant in energy resources. With 600 hydroelectric power stations in use and 500 more still under construction, the prefecture has a total power capacity of 547 megawatts and an annual output of 1.5 billion kilowatt-hours (5.4 PJ). Every city of the prefecture has been incorporated in the east China power network, which provides a 220,000-volt vertical and a 110,000-volt inter-regional power transmission system, with a stable substation capacity of 550,000 KVA.

== Culture ==
=== Tourist attractions ===
Lishui has stepped up its tourism recovery and integration into the Yangtze River Delta region with a number of agreements inked in Shanghai. Under an agreement signed by the Lishui City Administration of Culture, Radio and Television, Tourism and Sports and operators of Shanghai City Tour Card on August 24, 2020, a Shanghai-Lishui annual tourism pass will be launched, enabling holders to visit major attractions in both cities at discounted prices. It takes about two hours and 20 minutes to reach Lishui from Shanghai via high-speed rail. The city has two dozen 4A- and 5A-level attractions, 2,725 villages and more than 4,300 minsu (Chinese-style B&Bs).

Lishui is well known in China for its long history and beautiful landscapes. Yan Yu Lou (misty rain tower) was built during the Northern Song dynasty (AD 960–1127). Many famous ancient poets praised the tower's beauty. Other recommendable scenic spots are Fengyangshan-Baishanzu National Natural Resort, Xiandu National Park, and Shishi Temple. Shishi Temple is a wooden structure built during the Song and Yuan dynasties (AD 960–1368). The most characteristic local dishes are Jade Mutton Roll, Shan Fen Ball, Anren Fish with beancurd, and Xian Cai Hot Pot.

=== Traditional cuisine ===
In Lishui, there are specialties such as Anren fish head, bamboo shoots and eggs, high mountain snails, braised fish, rolls and Jinyun flatbread, all of which are authentic Lishui local dishes; in 2007, the Lishui Tourism Bureau and the Lishui Catering Industry Association compiled the book "Dizhou Cuisine", which concentrates Lishui's famous dishes, including more than 50 varieties of traditional dishes such as Hibiscus lotus seeds, bamboo shoots and eggs, fried double dong, Jinyun knocking meat soup, Anren fish head and high mountain snails, more than 30 varieties of innovative dishes such as braised fish, fried cooking Zhi Zhi, chopped fish head, and more than 30 varieties of flavourful snacks such as Lishui rolls, Qingming fruit, yellow fruit and Jinyun biscuits.

== See also ==
- Lishui University
- List of people from Lishui
- She Ethnicity
