= Bu–Nao languages =

Hmongic language branch spoken in China

Bu–Nao
- Bunu languages
- Geographic distribution: Guangxi, Yunnan, and Guizhou, China
- Ethnicity: Bunu
- Native speakers: (390,000 cited 2001)
- Linguistic classification: Hmong–Mien: Hmongic; West Hmongic; Bu–Nao
- Subdivisions: Bunu; Nao Klao; Numao

Language codes
- ISO 639-3: bwx
- Glottolog: buna1280

The Bu–Nao or Bunu languages are a Hmongic (Miao) language branch spoken in Guangxi, Yunnan, and Guizhou in China. Its speakers are officially classified as ethnic Yao and speak Hmongic languages. The branch consists of three languages, which are Bunu (or Bunu proper), Baonao (Nao Klao), and Numao. The term Bu–Nao is a portmanteau of Bunu and Nao Klao.

== Classification ==
Speakers of Bu–Nao languages are officially classified as Yao people by the Chinese government, although they speak Hmongic languages rather than Mienic languages. Strecker (1987) had classified Bunu proper as a Western (Chuanqiandian) Hmongic language, and the other "Bunu" languages—Younuo (Yuno), Wunai (Hm Nai), and Jiongnai (Kiong Nai)—as distinct branches of Hmongic. Matisoff (2001) grouped all of these together in a Bunu branch of Hmongic (that is, outside Western Hmongic). Ratliff (2010) classified Bunu within Western Hmongic and moved Jiongnai to its own peripheral branch of Hmongic. Wang & Deng (2003) classify the Bu–Nao languages as a cousin branch of Western Hmongic, and Jiongnai and Younuo as independent branches.

== Language varieties ==
Bu–Nao language varieties are spoken by a total of 390,000 speakers. They can be divided into three major clusters, namely Bunu, Baonao, and Numao.

Intelligibility among these varieties is difficult, and they may also be considered separate languages. Strecker (1987) suggested they may not form a group at all, but separate languages within West Hmongic.
