= Younuo language =

Hmongic language spoken in Guangxi, China

Younuo
- Yuno
- ʑou13 nɔ13
- Native to: China
- Region: Longsheng Various Nationalities Autonomous County, Guangxi, China
- Native speakers: (9,700 cited 1995)
- Language family: Hmong–Mien: Hmongic; Bahengic or Sheic?; Younuo

Language codes
- ISO 639-3: buh
- Glottolog: youn1235
- ELP: Younuo Bunu
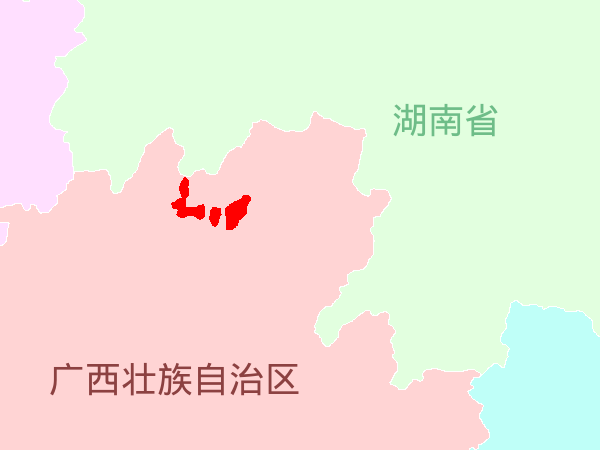

Younuo (also spelled Yuno, Chinese: 优诺语 yōunuò; autonym: ʑou13 nɔ13) is a divergent Hmongic language spoken in Longsheng Various Nationalities Autonomous County, Guangxi, China. Mao (2007:129) reports a total of approximately 4,000 speakers.

== Classification ==
The classification of Younuo within Hmongic is uncertain, although it may be more closely related to Pa-Hng or She. According to Mao (2007), Younuo is most closely related to Pa-Hng, and forms a branch with it. However, Hsiu's (2015, 2018) computational phylogenetic study classifies Younuo as more closely related to She, Jiongnai, and Pana. Li (2018) also treats Younuo as closely related to She, Jiongnai, and Pana.

== Demographics ==
Like Pa-Hng speakers, the Younuo are also called "Red Yao" 红瑶, which can refer to various Yao groups speaking different languages. Younuo speakers are also called Shanhua Red Yao 山话红瑶, and number about 4,600 people. Their neighbors, the Pinghua Red Yao 平话红瑶, speak a Pinghua dialect related to the Chinese varieties of Guibei Pinghua 桂北平话 and Shaozhou Tuhua, and number just over 10,000 people (Mao 2007).

== Distribution ==
Younuo is spoken in Heping township (和平乡), Longsheng Various Nationalities Autonomous County, Guangxi, China, in the villages of Liutian 柳田 (including Xiaozhai 小寨), Jinjiang 金江, Xinlu 新禄, Jinkeng 金坑 (including Huangluo 黄落), and a few others (Mao 2007:129). The Red Yao of Longsheng County are also distributed in Sishui 泗水, Madi 马堤, and Jiangdi 江底 townships.

== Phonology ==
The tables below present the vowels and consonant phonemes of Younuo as spoken in Xiaozhai (小寨).

=== Vowels ===
	Front	Central	Back
Close	i		u
Mid	e	ə	o
Open	a		ɔ

=== Diphthongs ===
Younuo has relatively few diphthongs. These are: ei, ai, au, ui, iu, and ou. In addition to vowels and diphthongs, other possible syllable codas are n and ŋ.

=== Consonants ===
		Bilabial	Alveolar		Alveolo-palatal	Dorsal		Glottal
		Bilabial	Central	Lateral	Alveolo-palatal	Palatal	Velar	Glottal
Stops	Voiceless	p	t				k
Stops	Aspirated	pʰ	tʰ				kʰ
Stops	Palatalized Asp.	pʰʲ	tʰʲ				kʰʲ
Stops	Palatalized	pʲ	tʲ				kʲ
Fricatives	Voiceless	f	s		ɕ			h
Fricatives	Palatalized	fʲ
Fricatives	Labialized							hʷ
Fricatives	Voiced	v
Fricatives	Palatalized	vʲ
Affricates	Voiceless		t͡s		t͡ɕ
Aspirated		t͡sʰ		t͡ɕʰ
Palatalized Asp.		t͡sʲʰ
Palatalized		t͡sʲ
Liquids	Voiced			l
Palatalized			lʲ
Voiceless			l̥
Palatalized			l̥ʲ
Nasals	Voiced	m	n		ȵ		ŋ
Palatalized	mʲ
Voiceless						ŋ̊

=== Tones ===
Younuo is a tonal language with eight tones.

Tone	Pitch Value	Example	Translation
1	33	ŋ̊33	water
2	13	ŋɔ13	sky
3	22	tshɔ22	ashes
4	22	—	—
5	35	l̥in33tai35	star
6	31	noŋ31	bird
7	53	lin13khuŋ53	terraced field
8	31	—	—
