= Pa-Hng language =

Hmong–Mien language of China and Vietnam

Pa-Hng
- Pateng
- Pronunciation: [pa31 ŋ̊ŋ35]
- Native to: China, Vietnam
- Native speakers: (34,000 cited 1995–2009)
- Language family: Hmong–Mien: Hmongic; Bahengic; Pa-Hng

Language codes
- ISO 639-3: pha
- Glottolog: pahn1237
- Pa-Hng is classified as Vulnerable by the UNESCO Atlas of the World's Languages in Danger.

Pa-Hng (also spelled Pa-Hung; 巴哼语 Bāhēng yǔ) is a divergent Hmongic (Miao) language spoken in Guizhou, Guangxi, and Hunan in southern China as well as northern Vietnam.

== Classification ==
Pa-Hng has long been recognized as divergent. Benedict (1986) argued that one of its dialects constituted a separate branch of the Miao–Yao family. Ratliff found it to be the most divergent Hmongic (Miao) language that she analyzed. This Bahengic branch also includes Younuo (Yuno) and Wunai (Hm Nai).

== Names ==
Pa-Hng speakers are called by the following names:

- pa31 ŋ̥ŋ35 (巴哼)
- m̥m35 nai33 (唔奈)
- Red Yao (红瑶)
- Flowery Yao (花瑶)
- Eight Surname Yao (八姓瑶)

In Liping County, Guizhou, the Dong people call the Pa-Hng ka31 jiu33 (嘎优), while the Miao people call them ta55 tia52 ju33 (大达优). In Tongdao County, Hunan, the Pa-Hng (xeŋ33) are also known as the Seven Surname Yao 七姓瑶, since they have the seven surnames of Shen 沈, Lan 兰, Dai 戴, Deng 邓, Ding 丁, Pu 蒲, and Feng 奉.

In China, Pa-Hng speakers are classified as Yao, even though their language is Hmongic rather than Mienic.

== Varieties ==
Mao & Li (1997) splits Pa-Hng into the following subdivisions, and most closely related to Hm Nai:

- Pa-Hng proper (巴哼 pa31 ŋ̥ŋ35)
  - Northern
  - Southern
- Hm Nai (唔奈 m̥m35 nai33)

Vocabulary word lists for these three Pa-Hng varieties can be found in Mao & Li (1997). An additional dialect is found in Vietnam.

- Northern Pa-Hng: Gundong 滚董, Liping County 黎平, Guizhou
- Southern Pa-Hng: Wenjie 文界, Sanjiang County 三江, Guangxi
- Hm Nai: Huxingshan 虎形山, Longhui County 隆回, Hunan

The Na-e dialect (also known by the Vietnamese rendition of Pa-Hng, Pà Then [Pateng]), is a geographic outlier. Paul Benedict (1986) argued that it is not actually Pa-Hng, or even Hmongic, but a separate branch of the Miao–Yao language family. However, Strecker (1987) responded that it does appear to be a Pa-Hng dialect, though it has some peculiarities, and that Pa-Hng as a whole is divergent.

Jerold A. Edmondson has reported Pa-Hng dialects in Bac Quang District and Hong Quang Village of Chiem Hoa District in northern Vietnam, and found that they were most closely related to the Pa-Hng dialect spoken in Gaoji Township 高基, Sanjiang County, Guangxi.

== Distribution ==
=== China ===
Pa-Hng speakers are distributed in the following counties in China. Most of the counties have 1,000–6,000 Pa-Hng speakers (Mao & Li 1997).

- Hunan
  - Longhui County, Shaoyang (Hm-Nai speakers)
    - Hm-Nai: Huxingshan 虎形山乡, Xiaoshajiang 小沙江乡, Motang 磨塘乡, Dashuitian 大水田乡
  - Dongkou County, Shaoyang (Hm-Nai speakers)
  - Chenxi County, Huaihua (Hm-Nai speakers)
  - Xupu County, Huaihua (Hm-Nai speakers)
  - Tongdao County, Huaihua (Hm-Nai speakers): 1,779 people (2000), in Chuansu Township 传素瑶族乡 and Linkou Township 临口镇 (in Shangdong 上洞村 and Xiadong 下洞村 villages). Highly endangered status.
  - Chengbu Miao Autonomous County, Shaoyang
  - Xinning County, Shaoyang
  - Suining County, Shaoyang (100+ speakers)
- Guizhou
  - Liping County
    - Northern Pa-Hng: Gundong 滚董乡, Shunhua 顺化乡
  - Congjiang County
    - Southern Pa-Hng: Gaomang 高忙乡
- Guangxi
  - Rongshui County (12,000+ speakers)
    - Northern Pa-Hng: Dalang 大浪乡, Danian 大年乡, Antai 安太乡, Dongtou 洞头乡, Gunbei 滚贝乡, Wangdong 汪洞乡, Gandong 杆洞乡; Huaibao 怀宝镇
    - Southern Pa-Hng: Baiyun 白云乡, Dalang 大浪乡, Anchui 安陲乡, Xiangfen 香粉乡
  - Sanjiang County
    - Northern Pa-Hng: Tongle 同乐乡, Laobao 老堡乡
    - Southern Pa-Hng: Wenjie 文界乡, Liangkou 良口乡
  - Longsheng County
    - Southern Pa-Hng: Sanmen 三门乡, Pingdeng 平等乡
  - Lingui County
  - (13 other counties)

=== Vietnam ===
Pa-Hng is also spoken in small pockets of northern Vietnam. In Vietnam, the Pa-Hng are an officially recognized ethnic group numbering around a few thousand people, where they are called Pà Thẻn. Na-e as reported by Bonifacy (1905) is also found in northern Vietnam.

- Tân Trịnh, Quang Bình District, Hà Giang Province, Vietnam
- Bắc Quang District, Hà Giang Province, Vietnam
  - Minh Thương Village, Tân Lập Township
  - Tân Thịnh Township
- Hồng Quang Village, Chiêm Hoá District, Tuyên Quang Province (62 km northwest of Chiêm Hoá City), where the speakers are known as Mèo Hoa (Flowery Miao)

According to Vu, the ancestors of the Pà Thẻn had first migrated from Guangxi to Hải Ninh (now Quảng Ninh Province), and then from Hải Ninh to the Thái Nguyên area. The Pà Thẻn then split off to settle in three main areas.

- Linh Phú (Chiêm Hoá District, Tuyên Quang) and Trung Sơn (Yên Sơn District, Tuyên Quang)
- Lăng Can (Na Hang District, Tuyên Quang), Hồng Quang (Chiêm Hoá District, Tuyên Quang), and Hữu Sản (Bắc Quang District, Hà Giang)
- From Xuân Minh (Quang Bình District, Hà Giang), the Pà Thẻn migrated to the communes of Yên Bình, Yên Thành, Tân Trịnh, Tân Nam (all in Quang Bình District, Hà Giang) and Tân Lập (Bắc Quang District, Hà Giang).

== Phonology ==
=== Consonants ===
		Labial		Alveolar		(Alveolo-) palatal	Velar		Uvular		Glottal
		plain	pal.	plain	pal.	(Alveolo-) palatal	plain	lab.	plain	lab.	Glottal
Nasal	voiced	m	mʲ	n		ȵ	ŋ				
Nasal	voiceless	m̥	m̥ʲ	n̥		ȵ̊	ŋ̊				
Nasal	breathy	mʱ	mʲʱ	nʱ		ȵʱ	ŋʱ				
Stop/ Affricate	voiceless	p	pʲ	t		tɕ	k	kʷ	q	qʷ	ʔ
Stop/ Affricate	aspirated	pʰ	pʲʰ	tʰ		tɕʰ	kʰ	kʷʰ	qʰ	qʷʰ	
Stop/ Affricate	breathy	pʱ	pʲʱ	tʱ		tɕʱ	kʱ	kʷʱ	qʱ		
Stop/ Affricate	prenasal	ᵐp	ᵐpʲ	ⁿt		ᶮtɕ	ᵑk		ᶰq		
Stop/ Affricate	prenasal breathy	ᵐpʱ	ᵐpʲʱ	ⁿtʱ		ᶮtɕʱ	ᵑkʱ		ᶰqʱ		
Fricative		f		s		ɕ	x				h
Approximant	voiceless			l̥	l̥ʲ						
Approximant	voiced	ʋ		l	lʲ	j		w			
Approximant	breathy	ʋʱ		lʱ	lʱʲ	jʱ					

- Alveolar sounds /t, tʰ, n, n̥, nʱ/ are heard as retroflex [ʈ, ʈʰ, ɳ, ɳ̊, ɳʱ] in the Laobao dialect.

=== Vowels ===
	Front		Central		Back		
	oral	nasal	oral	nasal	oral		nasal
Close	i	ĩ	(ɨ)		u		ũ
Near-close	ɪ	ɪ̃					
Close-mid	e	ẽ			ɤ	o	õ
Open-mid	ɛ	ɛ̃			ɔ		ɔ̃
Open			a	ã	ɑ		ɑ̃
Syllabic	m̩		n̩		ŋ̍		

/i/ can also be centralized to [ɨ] or [ʉ] when following initial sounds.

=== Tones ===
Pa-Hng is a tonal language. It has 8 tones.

Tone	Value	Example
1	35	mei³⁵
2	33	mei³³
3	31	m̥ei³¹
4	11	tau¹¹
5	55	ɫ̥a⁵⁵
6	44	kwhi44
7	53	tjhei⁵³
8	42	nei42

== See also ==
- Pa-Hng comparative vocabulary list (Wiktionary)
