= She Chinese =

Sinitic language of China

Shanke
- 山客话
- Native to: Fujian, Zhejiang
- Ethnicity: Shanke (She)
- Native speakers: 400,000 (2002)
- Language family: Sino-Tibetan: Sinitic; Chinese; Hakka; Shanke
- Early forms: Proto-Sino-Tibetan: Old Chinese; Proto-Hakka
- Writing system: Chinese characters

Language codes
- ISO 639-3: None (mis)
- Linguasphere: 79-AAA-gbf

Shanke dialect (simplified Chinese: 山客话; traditional Chinese: 山客話; pinyin: shānkèhuà; lit. 'mountain Hakka dialect'; pha̍k-fa-sṳ: sânhakfa), also known as Shanha dialect (simplified Chinese: 山哈话; traditional Chinese: 山哈話; pinyin: shānhǎhuà) (Note: "哈" is the phonetic loan Chinese character for "客" of "客家 (Hakka)") or She dialect (simplified Chinese: 畲话; traditional Chinese: 畲話; pinyin: shēhuà; pha̍k-fa-sṳ: chhiàfa), is the native Chinese language spoken by the vast majority of She (Shanke) people that is closely related to Hakka Chinese. Shanke speakers are located mainly in Fujian and Zhejiang provinces of Southeastern China, with smaller numbers of speakers in a few locations of Jiangxi (in Guixi and Yanshan County), Guangdong (in Chaozhou and Fengshun County) and Anhui (in Ningguo) provinces.

The Chinese government has not officially adopted a clear nomenclature distinguishing the Chinese Shanke dialect from the non-Chinese Hmongic She language. In its official introduction to the She ethnic group published by the National Ethnic Affairs Commission, the Shanke dialect is instead referred to simply as the "She language (Chinese: 畲语; lit. 'She language')", rather than as "Shanke dialect (Chinese: 山客话; lit. 'Shanke dialect')" or "She dialect (Chinese: 畲话; lit. 'She dialect')". As such, the two languages should not be confused. The non-Chinese Hmongic She language is not given any name at all, but is merely described as "closely related to the 'Bunu' language of the Yao people (belonging to the Hmongic languages)". This is quite different from the precise official naming of the languages of other ethnic minorities, such as the Uyghurs and Tibetans.

Linguist Luo Meizhen published a journal article specifically noting that there has been considerable inconsistency among scholars in the naming of this language. Owing to the absence of an official standardised name, this language has been referred to inconsistently across different publications. Some scholars call it the "She language (畲语)", while others refer to it as "She dialect (畲话)". However, these are all exonyms. The only designation that can be established with certainty is the endonym Shanke dialect (山客话), which is referred to by its native speakers.

== History ==
During the Tang dynasty, Shanke speakers lived in the Jiangxi-Guangdong-Fujian border region. Afterwards, they moved to their present locations further to the northeast.

== Classification ==
Although speakers of the Chinese Shanke dialect and speakers of the Hmongic She language (畲语, also known as Ho Ne) are both officially classified as members of the She ethnic group by People's Republic of China, Shanke actually contains very few words derived from Hmong-Mien languages. Instead, it has a relatively larger number of loanwords from the Kra-Dai languages. This pattern is consistent with that of Southern Min and Hakka.

Taking the Shanke dialect spoken in Shanyangge, Fujian as an example, the language can be divided into four principle layers. The first consists of elements shared with Hakka. The second and third reflect influences from Southern Min and Standard Chinese respectively. The fourth may derive either from the original substrate language once spoken by the She people or from new vocabulary developed during their history.

Although Shanke is classified linguistically as a variety of Hakka by many scholars, some member of the She ethnic group, out of a strong attachment to their ethnic identity, prefer to believe that the She people have an independent language of their own. As a result, they are reluctant to accept the classification of their language as a variety of Hakka.

Some linguists consider Shanke to be a variety of Hakka Chinese, while others consider it to be an unclassified variety of Chinese that has received some influence from Hakka and is part of Hakka. Hiroki Nakanishi (2010) considers Shanke to be a Hakka dialect that may have a She language (Hmongic) substratum. However, Zhao (2004) considers Shanke to be an independent branch of Chinese, and that it should not be classified within Hakka.

Depending on their locations, Shanke dialects have been variously influenced by Hakka, Gan, Wu, and Min.

Shanke dialect and She language speakers have separate histories and identities, although both are officially classified by the Chinese government as She people. The Dongjia of Majiang County, Guizhou are also officially classified as She people, but speak a Western Hmongic language closely related to Chong'anjiang Miao (重安江苗语), which is different from both Shanke dialect and She language.

== Dialects ==
You (2002:31-35) divides Shanke into 9 dialectal areas (fangyan qu 方言区), and with respective locations and speaker demographics from You (2002) listed as well. The Eastern Fujian and Southern Zhejiang dialectal areas each have over 100,000 speakers, while the smallest dialectal areas are in Guangdong and Jiangxi, with each having only a few thousand speakers. Altogether, there are more than 400,000 Shanke speakers in China.

- Mindong (闽东区, Eastern Fujian), spoken in the counties of Fu'an 福安, Fuding 福鼎, Xiapu 霞浦, Ningde 宁德, Shouning 寿宁, Zhouning 周宁, Zherong 柘荣, Pingnan 屏南, Luoyuan 罗源, Lianjiang 连江, Fuzhou 福州郊区, Minhou 闽侯, Minqing 闽清, and Yongqin 永泰. 184,000 speakers. In contact with Eastern Min.
- Minbei (闽北区, Northern Fujian), spoken in the counties of Nanping 南平, Jian'ou 建瓯, Jianyang 建阳, Shaowu 邵武, Shunchang 顺昌, and Guangze 光泽. 21,000 speakers. In contact with Northern Min.
- Minzhong (闽中区, Central Fujian), spoken in the counties of Sanming 三明, Yong'an 永安, Shaxian 沙县, and Ninghua 宁化. Also spoken in Shuangguishan 双贵山, Youxi County, Fujian. 12,000 speakers. In contact with Central Min.
- Minnan (闽南区, Southern Fujian), spoken in the counties of Licheng District 鲤城区 (in Quanzhou), Anxi 安溪, Dehua 德化, Yongchun 永春, Hua'an 华安, Longyan 龙岩, and Zhangping 漳平. 12,000 speakers. In contact with Southern Min. In Zhangping City, Shanyangge Shanke 山羊隔畲话 is spoken by over 800 people in the two villages of Shanyangge 山羊隔, Guilin Township 桂林乡, and Jianci 尖祠, Xi'nan Township 溪南乡. Shanyangge Shanke is distinct from Shejiake 畲家客, which is a Southern Min dialect spoken by over 100 people in Zhangping County in the two villages of Changta Village 长塔村, Xianghu Township 象湖乡 and Wei Village 尾村, Shuangyang Township 双洋乡.
- Zhenan (浙南区, Southern Zhejiang), spoken in the counties of Pingyang 平阳, Cangnan 苍南, Rui'an 瑞安, Wencheng 文成, Taishun 泰顺, Lishui 丽水, Jingning 景宁, Yunhe 云和, Longquan 龙泉, Songyang 松阳, Qingtian 青田, and Wuyi 武义. 120,000 speakers. In contact with Wu Chinese.
- Zhezhong (浙中区, Central Zhejiang), spoken in the counties of Longyou 龙游, Quxian 衢县, Lanxi 兰溪, Jinhua 金华, and Suichang 遂昌. 23,000 speakers. In contact with Wu Chinese.
- Zhebei (浙北区, Northern Zhejiang), spoken in the counties of Tonglu 桐庐, Jiande 建德, Lin'an 临安, Fuyang 富阳, and Anji 安吉. 13,000 speakers. In contact with Wu Chinese.
- Yuedong (粤东区, Eastern Guangdong), spoken in the counties of Chaozhou 潮州 and Fengshun 丰顺. 2,200 speakers. In contact with the Teochew dialect of Southern Min. In Fengshun County, it is spoken in Fengping Village 凤坪村, Tanjiang Town 潭江镇. You, Lei & Lan (2005) document the Shanke variety of Fenghuangshan 凤凰山 ("Phoenix Mountain") in eastern Guangdong.
- Gandong (赣东区, Eastern Jiangxi), spoken in the counties of Guixi 贵溪 and Yanshan 铅山. 4,000 speakers. In contact with Gan Chinese. The Shanke variety of Taiyuan 太源畲族乡, Yanshan County, Jiangxi has been documented in detail by Hu & Hu (2013), while the Shanke variety of Zhangping Township 樟坪畲族乡, Guixi City, Jiangxi has been documented in detail by Liu (2008).

In Anhui Province, there is also a Shanke dialect spoken by about 2,400 people in Yunti She Ethnic Township (云梯畲族乡), Ningguo City that has been influenced by Lower Yangtze Mandarin.

You (2002) provides a comparative vocabulary list for the following 13 datapoints. The Zhebei dialectal area 浙北方言区 has not been included by You (2002).

1. Fu'an 福安, Ningde, Fujian (Mindong dialectal area 闽东方言区)
2. Fuding 福鼎, Ningde, Fujian (Mindong dialectal area 闽东方言区; includes Xiamen She Ethnic Township 硖门畲族乡)
3. Luoyuan 罗源, Fuzhou, Fujian (Mindong dialectal area 闽东方言区)
4. Sanming 三明, Fujian (Minzhong dialectal area 闽中方言区)
5. Shunchang 顺昌, Nanping 南平, Fujian (Minbei dialectal area 闽北方言区)
6. Hua'an 华安, Zhangzhou 华安, southern Fujian (Minnan dialectal area 闽北方言区)
7. Guixi 贵溪, Yingtan 鹰潭, Jiangxi (Gandong dialectal area 赣东方言区)
8. Cangnan 苍南, Wenzhou 温州, Zhejiang (Zhe'nan dialectal area 浙南方言区)
9. Jingning 景宁, Lishui 丽水, Zhejiang (Zhe'nan dialectal area 浙南方言区)
10. Lishui 丽水, Zhejiang (Zhe'nan dialectal area 浙南方言区)
11. Longyou 龙游, Quzhou 衢州, Zhejiang (Zhezhong dialectal area 浙中方言区; includes Muchen She Ethnic Township 沐尘畲族乡)
12. Chaozhou 潮州, Guangdong (Yuedong dialectal area 粤东方言区)
13. Fengshun 丰顺, Meizhou 梅州, Guangdong (Yuedong dialectal area 粤东方言区)

== Distribution ==
The following maps show ethnic She townships and other administrative divisions (highlighted in magenta) in Zhejiang, Fujian, and Jiangxi provinces. The She people of these three provinces speak Shanke, while the She of central Guangdong and Guizhou speak Hmongic languages.

The most Shanke speakers are located in Ningde Prefecture, Fujian, and Wenzhou and Lishui Prefectures, Zhejiang. Smaller communities of Shanke speakers are located in central Zhejiang, southern Fujian, the mountainous interior of western Fujian, southeastern Anhui, eastern Guangdong, and northeastern Jiangxi near its border with Fujian. It is not known whether Shanke is spoken by She people living in central and southern Jiangxi.

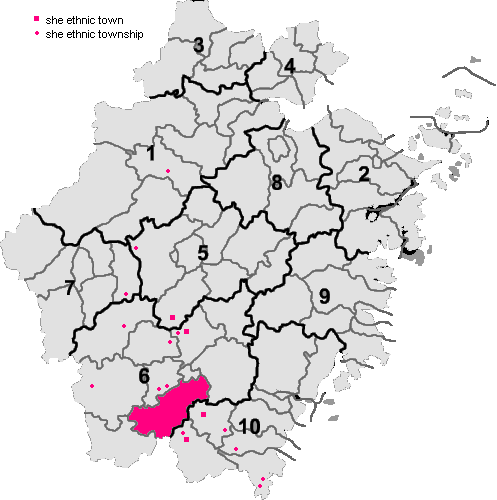
She ethnic county, townships and towns in Zhejiang

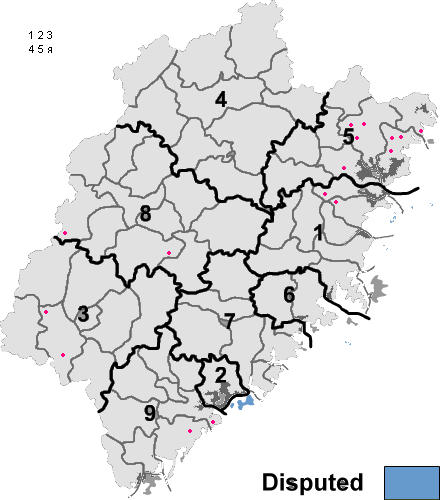
She ethnic townships in Fujian

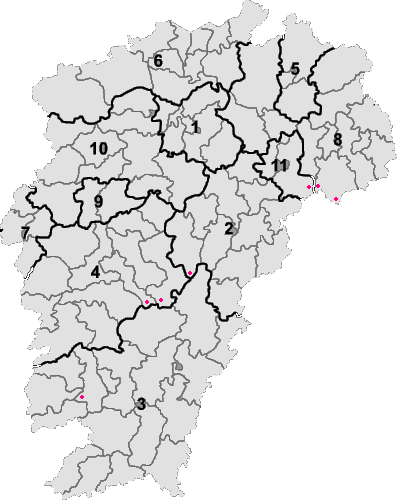
She ethnic townships in Jiangxi

== Phonology ==
Shanke is a very dialectally uniform language. Like many southern Chinese languages, it has syllables with stop codas, traditionally considered as part of a separate tone class. Much like its sister branch Hakka Chinese, it has the same three nasal codas as well as three stop codas. However, the /k/ coda has evolved into a glottal stop.

=== Consonants ===
In addition to the consonants listed below, Shanke also has a null initial, often realized as a glottal stop.

		Labial	Dental	Alveopalatal	Velar	Glottal
Nasal		m	n		ŋ	
Plosive	tenuis	p	t		k	ʔ (Note: This consonant only appears phonemically in syllable coda position.)
Plosive	aspirated	pʰ	tʰ		kʰ	
Affricate	tenuis		ts	(tʃ) (Note: Consonants in parentheses are present in only some dialects.)		
Affricate	aspirated		tsʰ	(tʃʰ)		
Fricative	median		s	(ʃ)		h
Fricative	lateral		(ɬ)			
Approximant			l			

Some dialects of Shanke in eastern Fujian (including the Fú'ān and Fúdǐng varieties) have the initial voiceless lateral fricative ɬ- where other Shanke dialects have an initial s-.

Only a limited number of consonants can act as a coda, including the nasals and the plain labial, dental, and glottal stops.

=== Vowels ===
	Front		Central	Back
	unrounded	rounded	Central	Back
Close	i	y (Note: This vowel is present in most dialects.)		u
Close-mid	e	(ø) (Note: Vowels in parentheses are present in only some dialects.)		o
Open-mid	(ɛ)			ɔ
Open			a	

The syllabic coronal consonant /z̩/, frequently known in Chinese linguistics as the apical vowel, is also found in some dialects of Shanke.

=== Tones ===
Shanke has 4 phonemic contour tones, which can be organized into the following 6 tone categories (You 2002:80-83); the Dark Going tone has merged into the Dark Level tone in the development of Shanke. Almost all Shanke dialects have identical tone values in each tone category, which are provided below.

		Tone category			
		Level 平	Rising 上	Going 去	Entering 入
Tone register	Dark 陰	1. 陰平; [˦] (44) (Note: Two dialects have different tone values: Yóu records the Huá'ān dialect as having [˧] (33) and Zhào records a Jǐngníng dialect as having a tone value of [˦˧] (43).); Dark Level	3. 上聲; [˧˥] (35) (Note: Several dialects also have tone values of [˨˩˧] (213), and Zhào records a Jǐngníng dialect as having a tone value of [˧˨˥] (325).); Rising tone		7. 陰入; [˥] (5); Dark Entering
Tone register	Light 陽	2. 陽平; [˨] (22); Light Level		6. 陽去; [˨˩]/[˦˨] (21 or 42); Light Going	8. 陽入; [˨] (2); Light Entering

The Tàiyuán dialect may have more divergent tone values. Hú recorded the dialect as having [˨˩˨] (212) for its Light Level tone, [˨˥] (25) on its Rising tone, and [˦] (4) for its Dark Entering tone.

== Lexicon ==
=== Unique vocabulary ===
You (2002:183-216) notes that Shanke has many unique vocabulary items that have no cognates in Hakka, Gan, Wu, or any other Chinese language. Instead, many words have parallels in Hmong-Mien languages (You 2002:490-504), and in Tai and Kam-Sui languages (You 2002:458-489). Other words appear to have no parallels in any other language family or branch (You 2002:505-518).

=== Swadesh list ===
Below is a vocabulary table comparing Swadesh lists of Shanke (Fengshun), Hakka (Boluo), and Shanke (Boluo), from Gan (2011:188-191).

Standard Chinese gloss	English gloss	Shanke (Fengshun)	Hakka (Boluo)	She language (Boluo)
我	I	ŋai^{1}	ŋai^{2}	vaŋ^{4}
你	you	ŋi^{1}	ŋi^{2}	muŋ^{2}
我们	we	ŋai^{1}nai^{6}ŋin^{2}	ŋai^{2}ne^{6}	pa^{1}
这	this	kai^{6}	lia^{6}	lja^{3}
那	that	hɔŋ^{6}	kai^{6}	u^{3}
谁	who	mɔi^{6}ŋin^{2}	nai^{5}ŋin^{2}	pe^{4}le^{2}
什么	what	mat^{7}kai^{1}	mat^{7}kai^{5}	ha^{5}la^{5}
不	not	—	m^{1}	a^{6}
全部	all	—	tsʰiɛn^{2}pu^{5}	tsʰjen^{5}pʰu^{4}
多	many	tɔ^{1}	tɔ^{1}	u^{5}
一	one	ʒit^{7}	it^{2}	i^{6}
二	two	ŋi^{6}	ŋi^{5}	u^{1}
大	big	tʰai^{6}	tʰai^{6}	vɔŋ^{2}
长	long	tʃʰɔŋ^{2}	tsʰɔŋ^{2}	ka^{1}ta^{3}
小	small	sai^{1}	sɛ^{5}	sɔŋ^{1}
女人	female	pu^{1}ŋioŋ^{2}ŋin^{2}	ŋi^{3}ŋin^{2}	le^{2}va^{3}
男人	male	nam^{2}ŋin^{2}	lam^{2}ŋin^{2}	le^{2}pu^{3}
人	person	ŋin^{2}	ŋin^{2}	le^{2}
鱼	fish	ŋiu^{2}	ŋ̩^{2}	pja^{4}
鸟	bird	tau^{3}	tiau^{1}	lɔ^{4}taŋ^{1}
狗	dog	kou^{3}	kiu^{3}	kja^{3}
虱子	louse	sɛt^{7}ŋioŋ^{2}	set^{7}	taŋ^{5}
树	tree	ʃu^{6}	su^{6}	tɔŋ^{5}
种子	seed	—	tsuŋ^{3}tsi^{3}	ka^{3}lɔ^{1}
叶子	leaf	ʒep^{3}	jap^{8}	pjɔŋ^{2}
根	root		kin^{1}	kʰjuŋ^{2}
树皮	bark	—	su^{5}pi^{2}	tɔŋ^{5}kʰu^{5}
皮肤	skin	pʰi^{2}	pʰi^{2}	kʰu^{5}
肉	meat	pi^{3}	ŋiuk^{7}	kwe^{2}
血	blood	—	hiet^{7}	si^{3}
骨头	bone		kut^{7}	suŋ^{3}kɔ^{3}
脂肪	fat	—	—	—
鸡蛋	egg	lan^{3}	kai^{1}tsʰun^{2}	kwe^{1}kja^{5}
角	horn	—	kɔk^{7}	kaŋ^{1}
尾	tail	mui^{1}	mui^{1}	ka^{1}tɔ^{3}
羽毛	feather	—	iuŋ^{2}mau^{1}	pi^{1}
头发	hair	tʰeu^{2}mou^{1}	tʰiu^{2}mau^{1}	kaŋ^{6}kʰu^{5}pi^{1}
头	head	tʰeu^{2}	tʰiu^{2}	kaŋ^{6}kʰu^{5}
耳朵	ear	ŋi^{3}kʰuŋ^{6}	ŋi^{3}kuŋ^{1}	ka^{2}kʰuŋ^{3}
眼睛	eye	ȵian^{3}kʰiʔ^{8}	ŋan^{2}	ka^{1}kʰɔ^{3}
鼻子	nose	pʰi^{6}kuŋ^{6}	pʰi^{6}	ŋ̩^{3}pju^{4}
嘴	mouth	tsɔi^{1}	tsɔi^{5}	tjɔ^{2}
牙齿	tooth	ŋa^{2}tʃʰi^{3}	ŋa^{2}	mun^{3}
舌头	tongue	ʃet^{8}ma^{2}	set^{8}ma^{2}	pi^{6}
爪子	claw	tsau^{3}	tsau^{3}	tsau^{5}
脚	foot	kioʔ^{7}	kiɔk^{7}	tɔ^{5}
膝	knee	kioʔ^{7}puʔ^{7}tʰeu^{3}	tsʰit^{7}tʰiu^{2}	tɔ^{5}tʰju^{4}kui^{3} (Note: kneecap 膝盖)
手	hand	ʃeu^{3}	siu^{3}	kʰwa^{4}
肚子	belly	tu^{3}ʃi^{3}	tu^{3}pʰat^{8}	ŋiɔ^{3}ka^{3}
脖子	neck	kiaŋ^{3}	kjaŋ^{3}	ka^{3}kjen^{1}
乳房	breast	—	ŋiɛn^{5}pʰɔŋ^{2}	ŋjuŋ^{3}
心脏	heart	ɕim^{1}	sim^{1}	fun^{1}
肝	liver	kan^{1}	kɔn^{1}	fun^{1}
喝	drink	—	hɔt^{7}	hɔ^{6}
吃	eat	ʃiʔ^{8}	sit^{8}	luŋ^{2}
咬	bite	ŋieʔ^{8}	ŋau^{1}	tʰu^{6}
看见	see	tʰai^{3}	tʰe^{3}tʰau^{2}	mɔ^{6}pʰu^{6}
听见	hear	tʰaŋ^{5}	tʰaŋ^{5}tʰau^{2}	kuŋ^{5}
知道	know	tɛ^{1}	ti^{1}	pe^{1}
睡	sleep	fun^{2}	sɔi^{5}	pɔ^{5}
死	die	—	si^{2}	tʰa^{4}
杀	kill	laʔ^{7}	sat^{7}	ta^{5}
游泳	swim	—	ju^{2}sui^{3}	ka^{1}tu^{6}kwe^{2}
飞	fly	pui^{1}	fui^{1}	ŋi^{5}
走	go	ham^{2}	tsiu^{2}	ka^{1}pi^{1}
来	come	lɔi^{2}	lɔi^{4}	lu^{4}
躺	lie	—	sɔi^{5}	ɔŋ^{2}
坐	sit	tsʰɔŋ^{3}	tsʰɔ^{1}	ŋjuŋ^{1}
站	stand	kʰi^{1}	kʰi^{1}	su^{3}
给	give	pun^{1}	pi^{1}	puŋ^{1}
说	say	va^{6}kɔŋ^{3}	kuŋ^{3}	kuŋ^{1}
太阳	sun	ŋiet^{8}tʰeu^{2}	tʰai^{5}jɔŋ^{1}	lɔ^{1}kɔ^{3}
月亮	moon	ŋiɔt^{8}hau^{6}	ŋiet^{7}kɔŋ^{1}	le^{5}
星星	star	saŋ^{6}	sin^{1}	le^{5}taŋ^{1}
水	water	ʃui^{3}	sui^{3}	ɔŋ^{2}
雨	rain	ʃui^{3}	sui^{1}	luŋ^{1}
石头	stone	ʃaʔ^{8}	sak^{8}tʰiu^{2}	za^{1}kɔ^{3}
沙子	sand	ʃa^{6}	sa^{1}	hja^{1}
土地	earth	tʰi^{6}	tu^{2}	ta^{1}
云	cloud	vun^{2}	vun^{2}	tsɔŋ^{1}ɔŋ^{2}
烟	smoke	ien^{1}	iɛn^{1}	in^{1}
火	fire	—	fɔ^{3}	tʰɔ^{4}
灰	ash	fɔi^{1}	fɔi^{1}	si^{3} (Note: ash of grass/wood 草木灰)
烧	burn	—	sau^{1}	fa^{3}
路	road	lu^{6}	lu^{6}	kja^{3}
山	mountain	san^{1}	san^{1}	kje^{6}
红	red	fuŋ^{2}	fuŋ^{2}	si^{5}
绿	green	luʔ^{8}	luk^{8}	ka^{6}pʰu^{2}
黄	yellow	vɔŋ^{3}	vɔŋ^{2}	kʰun^{2}
白	white	pʰaʔ^{8}	pʰak^{8}	kjɔ^{1}
黑	black	vu^{1}	u^{1}	kjaŋ^{1}
晚上	night	am^{1}pu^{6}ʃi^{2}	man^{1}sɔŋ^{5}	lɔ^{3}kaŋ^{4}tsʰi^{2}
热	hot	ŋiet^{8}	ŋiet^{8}	kʰaŋ^{1}
冷	cold	laŋ^{1}	laŋ^{1}	kjɔŋ^{5}
满	full	—	man^{1}	paŋ^{3}
新	new	ɕin^{1}	sin^{1}	tu^{6}fun^{1}
好	good	hou^{3}	hau^{2}	ŋɔŋ^{5}
圆	round	ʒen^{2}	jin^{2}	zin^{2}
干	dry	—	kɔn^{1}	kʰui^{1}
名字	name	—	miaŋ^{2}	mui^{2}
