= Sheic languages =

Sheic
- She–Jiongnai
- Geographic distribution: China
- Ethnicity: Yao, She
- Linguistic classification: Hmong–Mien: Hmongic; Sheic
- Subdivisions: She (Ho Ne); Kiong Nai (Jiongnai); Pa Na (Pana); ?Younuo (Yuno)

Language codes
- Glottolog: jion1235

The Sheic or She–Jiongnai languages are a branch of the Miao (Hmongic) language family.

She (Ho-Ne) has long been recognized as a divergent language. It has been difficult to classify because of its numerous Chinese loanwords. Recently, it has been concluded that a few other Miao languages may be closer to She than to the rest of the family.

== Languages ==
Taguchi (2012), in a computational phylogenetic study, found Ho Ne (She), Kiong Nai and Pana (Pa Na) to form a branch of the Miao (Hmongic) family, with She closest to Pa Na. Hsiu (2015, 2018), also in a computational phylogenetic study, found She to be closest to Kiong Nai, and added Younuo as a fourth language.

- She (Ho-Ne)
- Kiong Nai (Jiongnai)
- Pana
- Younuo (Yuno)

Yuno has also been classified as Bahengic by Mao & Li (1997).

== Internal classification ==
Taguchi (2012) classifies the Sheic languages as follows:

- - - Pa Na
    - She
  - Kiong Nai

Hsiu (2015, 2018) classifies the Sheic languages as follows:

- - - - Kiong Nai
      - She
    - Pa Na
  - Younuo
