= She language =

Endangered Hmongic language of China

She
- Ho Le
- Native to: China
- Region: Zengcheng, Boluo County, Huidong County and Haifeng County in Guangdong
- Ethnicity: 710,000 She (2000 census)
- Native speakers: (910 cited 1999)
- Language family: Hmong–Mien: Hmongic; Sheic; Pana–She or Kiong Nai–She–Pana?; Kiong Nai–She?; She

Language codes
- ISO 639-3: shx
- Glottolog: shee1238
- ELP: She
- She is classified as Critically Endangered by the UNESCO Atlas of the World's Languages in Danger.

The She language (Mandarin: 畲語, Shēyǔ), autonym Ho Le or Ho Ne, /hɔ22 ne53/ or Ho Nte, is a critically endangered Hmong–Mien language spoken by the She people. Most of the over 709,000 She people today speak She Chinese (possibly a variety of Hakka Chinese). Those who speak Sheyu—approximately 1,200 individuals in Guangdong Province—call themselves Ho Ne, "mountain people" (活聶; huóniè).

== Names ==
Speakers refer to themselves as Ho Le (lit. 'mountain people'), as She is the Chinese exonym. Only the Huidong dialect has Ho Ne, while the Boluo, Haifeng, and Zengcheng dialects all use Ho Le as their autonym.

== Dialects ==
There are two main dialects of She, both of which are highly endangered. They are spoken in two small pockets to the west and east of Huizhou City, Guangdong.

- Luofu 罗浮 (Western She dialect), spoken in Luofu Mountain District 罗浮山区, Boluo County and in Zengcheng District. 580 speakers according to Ethnologue.
- Lianhua 莲花 (Eastern She dialect), spoken in Lianhua Mountain District 莲花山区, Haifeng County. 390 speakers according to Ethnologue.

== External relationships ==
She has been difficult to classify due to the heavy influence of Chinese on the language. Matisoff (2001), for example, left it unclassified within the Hmongic languages, and some have considered that much to be doubtful, leaving it unclassified within (and potentially a third branch of) the Hmong–Mien languages. She has monosyllabic roots, but has mainly compound words. However, due to the similar components of She, Mao & Li (2002) and Ratliff (2010) consider She to be most closely related to Jiongnai.

The She language is not to be confused with She Chinese (Chinese: 畲话, meaning 'She dialect' or 'She speech'), a sister branch to Hakka Chinese spoken by the She people of Fujian and Zhejiang provinces. She language and She Chinese speakers have separate histories and identities, although both are officially classified by the Chinese government as She people. The Dongjia of Majiang County, Guizhou are also officially classified as She people, but speak a Western Hmongic language closely related to Chong'anjiang Miao (重安江苗语).

== Phonology ==
=== Consonants ===
She consonants
		Labial		Alveolar		Velar			Glottal	
		plain	pal.	plain	pal.	plain	pal.	lab.	plain	pal.
Nasal	voiced	m	mʲ	n	nʲ	ŋ	ŋʲ			
Nasal	voiceless					ŋ̊				
Plosive	unaspirated	p	pʲ	t	tʲ	k	kʲ	kʷ	(ʔ)	
Plosive	aspirated	pʰ	pʰʲ	tʰ	tʰʲ	kʰ	kʰʲ	kʰʷ		
Affricate	unaspirated			ts	tsʲ					
Affricate	aspirated			tsʰ	tsʰʲ					
Fricative	voiceless	f		s	sʲ				h	hʲ
Fricative	voiced	v		z	zʲ					

Glottal stop is not distinct from zero (a vowel-initial syllable).

There are consonant mutation effects. For instance, pǐ + kiáu becomes pi̋’iáu, and kóu + tȁi becomes kóulȁi.

=== Vowels ===
The vowels of She are /i e a ɔ ɤ u/. It has the finals /j w n ŋ t k/, with /t k/ only in Hakka loans, though /ɤ/ is never followed by a final, and the only stops which follow the front vowels are /n t/.

=== Tones ===
She has six tones, reduced to two (high and low) in checked syllables (Hakka loans only). There is quite a lot of dialectical variability; two of the reported inventories (not necessarily in corresponding order) are:

[ ˥ ˦ ˧ ˨ ˨˩ ˧˥ ]: that is, /5 4 3 2 1 35/, or (on /a/), /a̋ á ā à ȁ ǎ/

[ ˥˧ ˦˨ ˧ ˨ ˧˩ ˧˥ ]: that is, /53 42 3 2 31 35/

== Vocabulary ==
=== Old Chinese loanwords ===
As a language in southern China, She has various loanwords from Old Chinese.

- 走 to run
- 行 to walk; in Standard Mandarin, it means "do" (general sense, not just "to walk")
- 烏 black
- 赤 red
- 寮 house; in Standard Mandarin, it means "hut"
- 禾 rice (plant); in Standard Mandarin, it means "millet"
- 鑊 wok
- 奉 to give; in Standard Mandarin, it means "give with respect"
- 其 he/she/it
- 着 to wear
- 睇 to look, just as in Cantonese; in Standard Mandarin, it means "look askance"
- 戮 to kill
- 齧 to bite
- 使 to use

== See also ==
- She word list (Wiktionary)
