= Bahengic languages =

Subbranch of the Miao language family of China and Southeast Asia

Bahengic
- Pahungic
- Geographic distribution: China, Vietnam
- Ethnicity: Yao
- Linguistic classification: Hmong–Mien: Hmongic; Bahengic
- Subdivisions: Pa-Hng (Baheng); Hm Nai (Wunai)

Language codes
- Glottolog: pahe1239

The Bahengic (Pahungic) languages are a divergent branch of the Miao (Hmongic) languages. Speakers are among the ethnic Bunu: Miao-speaking Yao people of China.

Pa-Hng (Baheng) has long been recognized as a divergent language. Benedict (1986) argued that one of its dialects constituted a separate branch of the Miao–Yao family, and Ratliff (2010) found it to be the most divergent Hmongic language that she analyzed. Mao & Li (1997) determined that two poorly known languages are closely related to Pa-Hng, though none are mutually intelligible:

Bahengic

- Hm-Nai (Wunai)
- Pa-Hng (Baheng)

Younuo (Yuno) was classified as a sister of Bahengic by Mao & Li (1997), although Younuo was later classified as Sheic.
