= Bunu language =

Hmongic language of China

Bunu
- Pu Nu
- Buod Nuox
- Native to: China
- Region: Guangxi and bordering regions
- Ethnicity: Yao
- Native speakers: (359,474 cited 2001)
- Language family: Hmong–Mien: Hmongic; West Hmongic; Bu–Nao; Bunu
- Dialects: Dongnu; Nunu; Bunuo
- Writing system: Latin

Language codes
- ISO 639-3: –
- Glottolog: buna1273

Bunu is a Hmongic language of southern China. Bunu speakers are classified ethnically as Yao by the People's Republic of China.

== Varieties ==
Meng (2001) lists the following language varieties for Bunu.

- Bunu (Chinese: 布努) (Pu Nu) - 359,474 speakers; representative dialect: Nongjing, Qibainong Township, Dahua County (大化七百弄乡弄京)
  - Dongnu (Chinese: 东努) (Tung Nu, autonyms: no22, tuŋ11 no22) - 293,489 speakers in Funing County, Yunnan (in Longshao 龙绍, etc.) and northern Guangxi: Du'an (in Meizhu 梅珠, etc.), Dahua, Bama, Pingguo, Tiandong, Mashan, Debao, Long'an, Baise, Tianyang, Donglan, Hechi, Shanglin, Xincheng, Yishan, Laibin. In Funing County, they are known as Buzha (布咋) (their autonym) or the Mountain Yao (山瑶).
  - Nunu (Chinese: 努努) (Nu Nu, autonyms: no22 no22, po33 no22) - 53,870 speakers in northwestern Guangxi: Lingyun (in Taohua 陶化, etc.), Fengshan, Donglan, Bama (in Xishan 西山, etc.), Tianlin, Leye
  - Bunuo (Chinese: 布诺) (Pu No, autonym: pu33 no22) - 12,115 speakers in Du'an (in Sanzhiyang 三只羊; Longma (龙麻) of Xia'ao (下坳乡), etc.), Guangxi

The Shaoyang Prefecture Gazetteer (1997:533) reports that the Miao of Xinning County, Hunan, speak a Bunu-branch language.

The Yunnan Province Gazetteer (1989) reports that a Bunu dialect known as pu55 ʐa11 (布咋) is spoken by about 7,000 people in Guichao (归朝乡) and Dongbo (洞波瑶族乡) (including in Dadongzhai 大洞寨, Saxiangdong Village 三湘洞村) townships of Funing County, Yunnan.

=== Others ===
The following may be alternative names for speakers of Bunu languages.

- Beidalao (北大老): 15,000 (1990) in Rong'an County and Rongshui County, Guangxi; probably Bunu, though divergent
- Changpao (长袍): 5,000 (1999) in southern Guizhou; undetermined linguistic affiliation, but could possibly be Bunu. Identified as Dongmeng by Bradley (2007).
- Youmai (优迈): 2,000 (1999) in southwestern Guizhou; possibly a Bunu variety; classified as Pingtang Miao by Li Yunbing (2000)

== Phonology ==
This section presents the phonology of the Dongnu variety of Qibainong (七百弄) Township, Dahua Yao Autonomous County, Guangxi as representative.

=== Consonants ===
		Labial		Dental/Alveolar			Retroflex	(Alveolo-) palatal	Velar			Glottal
		plain	pal.	plain	sib.	lat.	Retroflex	(Alveolo-) palatal	plain	lab.	pal.	Glottal
Nasal	voiceless	m̥	m̥ʲ	n̥				ɲ̟̊	ŋ̊	ŋ̊ʷ		
Nasal	voiced	m	mʲ	n				ɲ̟	ŋ	ŋʷ		
Stop	voiceless	p	pʲ	t			ʈ		k	kʷ	kʲ	
Stop	aspirated	pʰ	pʲʰ	tʰ			ʈʰ		kʰ	kʷʰ	kʲʰ	
Stop	prenasal	ᵐp	ᵐpʲ	ⁿt			ᶯʈ		ᵑk	ᵑkʷ	ᵑkʲ	
Stop	prenasal asp.	ᵐpʰ	ᵐpʲʰ	ⁿtʰ			ᶯʈʰ		ᵑkʰ	ᵑkʷʰ		
Affricate	voiceless					tɬ		tɕ				
Affricate	aspirated					tɬʰ		tɕʰ				
Affricate	prenasal			ⁿtθ	ⁿts	ⁿtɬ		ᶮtɕ				
Affricate	prenasal asp.			ⁿtθʰ	ⁿtsʰ	ⁿtɬʰ		ᶮtɕʰ				
Fricative	voiceless	f		θ	s	ɬ	ʂ	ɕ				h
Fricative	aspirated			θʰ	sʰ							
Fricative	voiced	v					ʐ	ʑ	ɣ			ɦ
Approximant						l						

Sounds /tɬ, tɬʰ, ⁿtɬ, ⁿtɬʰ/ may be pronounced as [pl, plʰ, ᵐpl, ᵐplʰ] in some areas.

=== Vowels ===
	Front	Central	Back	
Close	i		ɯ	u
Close-mid	e	ə	o	
Open-mid	ɛ	ə	ɔ	
Open		a		

Examples of vowels
Vowel	Example word
i	pi^{43} 'fruit'
ɯ	tɯ^{13} 'speak'
u	ɬu^{41} 'iron'
e	he^{33} 'open (a door)'
ə	s^{h}ə^{43} 'on top'
o	no^{13} 'person'
ɛ	hɛ^{33} 'fast'
ɔ	tɔ^{41} 'kill'
a	ka^{33} 'chicken'

=== Diphthongs and Other Rimes ===
Qibainong Dongnu has seven diphthongs: /ei/, /ai/, /au/, /ou/, /ɔi/, /iu/, and /eu/. Of these, /ɔi/, /iu/, and /eu/ only appear in recent loans from Chinese and Zhuang. Examples of words with diphthongs appear in the table below; yellow background is for those diphthongs that appear only in recent borrowings.

Examples of diphthongs
Diphthong	Example word
/ei/	tei^{35} 'team'
/ai/	mpai^{41} 'pig'
/au/	sau^{41} 'satiated'
/ou/	
/ɔi/	sɔi^{221} 'crime'
/iu/	ʐiu^{221} 'cotton tree'
/eu/	

Several vowels in Qibainong Dongnu permit a nasal consonant following, either /n/ or /ŋ/; most vowels permit one or the other, but not both. Qibainong also permits the rime /iaŋ/, despite not having a diphthong /ia/; /iaŋ/ is used only in recent loans. The possible combinations of vowel with final nasal, organized by the position of the vowel, appear in the table below.

Vowel + nasal sequences
	Front	Central	Back
Close	iŋ		uŋ
Close-mid	en	ən, əŋ	
Open-mid		ən, əŋ	ɔn, ɔŋ
Open		an, aŋ	

Examples of rimes with nasals
Rime	Example
iŋ	iŋ^{33} 'bitter'
uŋ	muŋ^{33} 'sick'
en	pen^{13} 'flower'
ən	
əŋ	nəŋ^{33} 'snake'
ɔn	
ɔŋ	nɔŋ^{13} 'eat'
an	man^{43} 'village'
aŋ	aŋ^{33} 'water'
iaŋ	

=== Tone ===
Qibainong Dongnu has eight tones, with four having an alternate realization, giving a total of 12 tone values.

Tones
Tone number	Tone class	Tone value	Example word
1	A1	33	tɔ^{33} 'deep'
1′	A1′	55	ven^{55} 'winnowing basket'
2	A2	13	tɔ^{13} 'come'
2′	A2′	35	ven^{35} 'garden'
3	B1	43	tɔ^{43} 'hit'
3′	B1′	54	pe^{54} 'bowl'
4	B2	232	tɔ^{232} 'read'
4′	B2′	454	pe^{454} 'handle'
5	C1	41	tɔ^{41} 'kill'
6	C2	221	tɔ^{221} 'die'
7	D1	32	tɔ^{32} 'affix (a seal)'
8	D2	21	tɔ^{21} 'bite'

== Alphabet ==
Bunu is written in a Latin script similar to other minority languages of China, such as Hmong-Mien languages, like Hmong or Tai-Kadai languages, like Kam or Sui. It uses Digraphs or combinations of letters instead of diacritics to represent additional sounds. The Bunu alphabet is:

Letter
a	b	by	c	ch	d	dl	e	ee	f	g	gw	gy	h	hl	hm	hmy	hn	hng	hngw	hny	hs	i	j	k	kw	ky	l	m	mb	mby	mc	mch	md	mdl	mg
IPA
a	p	pʲ	sʰ	ʈʰ	t	tɬ	ə	e/ɛ	f	k	kʷ	kʲ	h/ɦ	ɬ	m̥	m̥ʲ	n̥	ŋ̊	ŋ̊ʷ	ɲ̥	θʰ	i	tɕ	kʰ	kʷʰ	kʲ	l	m	mp	mpʲ	ntsʰ	ɳʈʰ	nt	ntɬ	ŋk
Letter
mgw	mgy	mhs	mj	mk	mkw	mp	mpy	mq	ms	mt	mtl	mz	mzh	n	ng	ngw	ny	o	p	py	q	r	s	sh	t	tl	u	uo	v	w	x	y	z	zh	
IPA
ŋkʷ	ŋkʲ	ntθʰ	ntɕ	ŋkʰ	ŋkʷʰ	mpʰ	mpʰʲ	ntɕʰ	ntθ	ntʰ	ntɬʰ	nts	ɳʈ	n	ŋ	ŋʷ	ɲ	ɔ	pʰ	pʰʲ	tɕʰ	ʐ	θ	ʂ	tʰ	tɬʰ	u	o	ɣ	v/ɯ	ɕ	ʑ	s	ʈ	

=== Tones ===
Tones are marked with a consonant letter written at the end of a syllable.

Tone
1	2	3	4	5	6	7	8
Value
33	13	43	232	41	221	32	21
Orthography
b	x	d	l	t	s	k	f

== Grammar ==
=== Word Classes ===
According to Meng (2001), Bunu has 12 parts of speech, namely, nouns, pronouns, numerals, classifiers, adjectives, verbs, intensifiers (状词), adverbs, prepositions, conjunctions, auxiliaries, and interjections.

==== Pronouns ====
Personal pronouns in Bunu exhibit a three-way distinction in both person and number, yielding nine contrasting terms:

Personal pronouns in Qibainong Dongnu
	Singular	Dual	Plural
First Person	tɕuŋ^{43}	a^{33}	pe^{33}
Second Person	kau^{13}	me^{33}	me^{13}
Third Person	ni^{232}	mo^{33}	mo^{13}

Bunu also has pronouns for 'oneself' and 'everyone', as well as a set of interrogative expressions:

Interrogative expressions in Qibainong Dongnu
Pronoun	Meaning
po^{33}si^{54}	'what'
ɦau^{221}tau^{221}	'how'
po^{43}tau^{221}	'who, which'
ɦa^{232}tau^{221}	'where'
pan^{33}tau^{221}	'when'

===== Demonstratives =====
According to Meng (2001), demonstratives fall within the word class of pronouns. Five demonstratives are attested in Qibainong: nɔŋ^{43/54} 'this (visible)', kau^{13/35} 'that (medial, visible)', uŋ^{33/55} 'that (distal, visible)', no^{43} 'that (unknown)', and i^{43} 'that (known, not visible)'.

==== Numerals ====
Cardinal numerals include the following:

Cardinal numerals in Qibainong Dongnu
Numeral	Meaning	Note
len^{13}	'zero'	
tɕau^{221}	'one'	used only in combination with classifiers
i^{55}	'one'	general use
au^{33}	'two'	
pe^{33}	'three'	
tɬa^{33}	'four'	
pjo^{33}	'five'	
ʈu^{41}	'six'	
sɔŋ^{221}	'seven'	
ʑo^{21}	'eight'	
tɕu^{13}	'nine'	
tɕu^{21}	'ten'	
pai^{41}	'hundred'	
sen^{33}	'thousand'	
van^{221}	'ten thousand'	
