= Qo Xiong =

Qo Xiong may refer to:

- Qo Xiong language
- Qo Xiong people
