= Xong =

Xong can refer to:

- Xong language, a Hmongic language of south-central China
- Limbu people, found in Nepal, India, and Bhutan
