= Xiong =

Xiong may refer to:

== Name ==
- Xiong (surname) (熊), a Chinese surname

== Location ==
- Xiong County, in Hebei, China

== Language ==
- The pinyin romanization of several Chinese characters, including 兄 (elder brother), 胸 (chest), 雄 (heroic) and 熊 (bear)
- The Xong language and the Miao people who speak it

== Group ==
- Xong, or Limbu people
- A subdivision of the Mongol armies: see Huns
