= Proto-Hakka =

Reconstructed ancestor of the Hakka varieties

- Common Neo-Hakka
- Reconstruction of: Hakka Chinese
- Region: Southern Chinese highlands
- Era: c. 1280-1530
- Reconstructed ancestors: Proto-Sino-Tibetan: Old Chinese

Proto-Hakka (also called Common Neo-Hakka, CNH) is the reconstructed proto-language from which all Hakka varieties descend. Like all branches of the Sinitic language family, proto-Hakka is difficult to reconstruct through the comparative method due to its multistratal lexicon.

== History ==
It is believed that Sinitic migration into what is now Southern China started in the Qin dynasty, after which a slow yet steady population continued to migrate southwards, up until the early Tang dynasty. The part of the population who lived in the highlands then underwent frequent amicable cultural exchange with the She people (as opposed to the Ho-nte, also classified by the Chinese government under the She ethnonym), who are believed to have descended from an indigenous people. The aforementioned Sinitic migrants likely spoke an early Sinitic language, and through this cultural exchange, the Sinitic language was transmitted to the ancestral She.

Later large migration waves due to the An-Shi Chaos and the fall of the Northern Song dynasty to the Jurchen-led Jin dynasty led to large increases of population, and conflicts between the migrants and pre-existing Highlanders of Sinitic ethnicity. Once the conflict had calmed down, the two groups intermingled, and the language of these migrants provided superstrata on one of the pre-existing Highlander languages, which became the multi-stratal proto-Hakka.

While Neo-Hakka and She share common innovations, there are She-internal innovations that are not shared with Neo-Hakka. This implies that Neo-Hakka is the sister branch to She, forming a bifurcating tree from their common ancestor. This proto-language is in turn closely related to the paraphyletic group of stem Hakka, or "Paleo-Hakka". (Note: Coblin translates the conventional Chinese name of 老客家話 as "Paleo-Hakka" as opposed to "Old Hakka", as "Old Hakka" would imply the oldest textually attested stage of the language.)

== Classification ==
To reconstruct proto-Hakka, the language varieties to be included must first be decided. O'Connor's earlier reconstruction only utilizes data on Moiyan-like Hakka varieties, which Coblin calls "Mainstream Hakka". The dialects included in Coblin's reconstruction are known as "Neo-Hakka", which includes Mainstream Hakka, but also varieties in southern Jiangxi which are not mutually intelligible with Mainstream Hakka and whose speakers do not consider themselves Hakka people.

The following criteria are used to determine Neo-Hakka varieties:

- Sonorant-initial syllables corresponding to the Light Rising tone in Qieyun system appear in the Dark Level and Light Rising tones, and which tone they occur with are lexically determined.
- The copula should be a form of 係 *hei6.
- The first-person singular pronoun should take the form /ŋai/ in the popular register, or be derivable from an earlier */ŋai/.
- The verb "to eat" should be a form of 食 *šik8.

== Phonology ==
Given the varieties to be included, the comparative method can then be applied to arrive at a reconstruction of this language. This reconstruction is described below.

=== Consonants ===
The following consonants are reconstructed for Common Neo-Hakka:

		Labial	Dental	Postalveolar	Velar	Glottal
Nasal		/m/	/n/	ň /ɲ/	/ŋ/	
Plosive	tenuis	/p/	/t/		/k/	
Plosive	aspirated	/pʰ/	/tʰ/		/kʰ/	
Affricate	tenuis		/ts/	tš /tɕ/		
Affricate	aspirated		/tsʰ/	tšʰ /tɕʰ/		
Fricative		/f/	/s/	š /ɕ/		/h/
Approximant		/v/	/l/			

Much like modern Hakka varieties, the consonants /m n ŋ p t k/ can appear in syllable-final position.

The consonant inventory is similar to modern Sinitic languages, and preserves the dental-postalveolar distinction found in other Sinitic languages like Modern Standard Mandarin or Hoisanese, as well as the postalveolar nasal, preserved in Shanghainese.

=== Glides ===
Common Neo-Hakka glides consist of /i/, /u/, or a combination thereof.

=== Vowels ===
	Front	Central	Back
Close	i	ɨ	u
Mid	e	(ə) (ɚ)	o
Open		a	

Vowels in parentheses appear in loanwords from some Northern Chinese variety, likely some Northern Ming or Qing Mandarin koine or even early Modern Standard Mandarin.

=== Finals ===
The following chart lists all of the finals in Common Neo-Hakka, which are a combination of glide, nucleus, and coda. Examples with the reconstructed final are written to the right, in parentheses if multiple variants with different finals can be reconstructed to the proto-language.

		Nucleus							
		/i/	/ɨ/	/u/	/e/	/ə/ /ɚ/	/o/	/a/	/ŋ̍/
Coda	∅	*-i 移 *-ui 未 (Note: This character has variant pronunciations with the same final.) *-iui (銳)	*-ɨ 思	*-u 烏 *-iu 於	*-e (事) *-ie (Note: Occurs exclusively in variant forms with *-iu) (鋸)	*-ə (Note: Occurs exclusively in the form *lə) (而) *ɚ (Note: Occurs only as an independent syllable.) 爾	*-o 多 *-io 茄 *-uo 火	*-a 啞 *-ia 夜 *-ua 花	*ŋ̍ (女)
Coda	/i/				*-ei (Note: Frequently occurs as a variant of *-ai) (買)		*-oi (海) *-ioi (Note: Tentative; appears as a variant of *-oi for certain syllables.) (歲) *-uoi (Note: Many syllables reconstructed with this final has variant pronunciations.) 灰	*-ai 帶 *-iai 低 *-uai 淮	
Coda	/u/				*-eu 歐 *-ieu 又		*-ou 老	*-au 包 *-iau 腰	
Coda	/m/	*-im 音			*-em 森		*-om 敢	*-am 帆 *-iam 鹽	
Coda	/n/	*-in 因		*-un 溫 *-iun 暈	*-en 恩		*-on 安 *-ion 遠 *-uon 酸	*-an 反 *-ian 煙 *-uan 關	
Coda	/ŋ/	*-iŋ 英		*-uŋ (翁) *-iuiŋ 永	*-eŋ 生 *-ueŋ 衡		*-oŋ 幫 *-ioŋ 羊 *-uoŋ 光	*-aŋ 硬 *-iaŋ 餅 *-uaŋ 橫 *-uiaŋ 兄	
Coda	/p/	*-ip 揖			*-ep 澀		*-op 鴿	*-ap 鴨 *-iap 葉	
Coda	/t/	*-it 一		*-ut 骨 *-iut 出	*-et 蝨		*-ot 割 *-iot 決 *-uot 刮 *-uiot 血	*-at 八 *-iat 熱 *-uat (括)	
Coda	/k/	*-ik 役		*-uk 屋 *-iuk 浴	*-ek 得 *-uek 或		*-ok 惡 *-iok 藥 *-uok 廓	*-ak 白 *-iak 石	

The finals reconstructed violate phonotactic rules expected from the Mainstream Hakka dialects, such as forbidding velar codas after front vowels. This is due to the existence of Hakka languages, like Ningdu Hakka, that allow both velars and dental consonants to act as codas after front vowels, thus the distinction must be reconstructed to their last common ancestor.

=== Tones ===
Common Neo-Hakka has 7 tones. Historical voiced stops become aspirated in the areal tone split. The traditional tone categories and their names are listed below:

		Tone category			
		Level 平	Rising 上	Going 去	Entering 入
Tone register	Dark 陰	1. 陰平; Dark Level	3. 陰上; Dark Rising	5. 陰去; Dark Going	7. 陰入; Dark Entering
Tone register	Light 陽	2. 陽平; Light Level		6. 陽去; Light Going	8. 陽入; Light Entering

Due to the diverse realization of tonal values in the descendants, precise tone values were not reconstructed. For example, the Dark Level tone is realized as [˦] (44) in Moiyan (Meixian), whereas in Ngiaupin (Raoping) it is [˩] (11) and in Ningdu it is [˦˨] (42) or [˦˧] (43). Tones 7 and 8, the Entering tones, are distinguished by their stop codas, and so do not count as independent tones phonemically. However, they are included separately as they are considered independent categories in Chinese historical linguistics.

== Vocabulary ==
Certain vocabulary items can also be reconstructed for proto-Hakka, a selection of which is provided below. Only reconstructions for forms surviving in more than two dialects are included by Coblin.

English gloss	Reconstruction	Written form
is / are (copula)	*hei6 (Note: If correct, this is the only etymon where the final *ei appears after a guttural consonant.)	係
eat	*šik8	食
I (1SG)	*ŋai1 / *ŋai2 / *ŋai3	
you (singular)	*ŋ̍2 ~ *ŋ̍3 / *ni1 / *ňi2	
that	*kai5 /*kai2 (Note: These forms are rarer.) / *kai3	
existential negative ("not have / not exist")	*mau2 / *muo2 (Note: Comparative reconstruction shows that the descendant forms cannot descend from the same proto-form.)	
son	*lai6	孻
daughter	*ŋ̍3 / *ňiu3 / *nie	女
daughter	*muoi5 *tse3 / *muoi5 *tsɨ3	妹子
face	*mian5	面
eye	*ŋan3	眼
eye	*ŋan3 *tšiu1	眼珠
eye	*muk7 *tšiu1	目珠
mouth	*tšoi5	(Note: While many sources write this as 嘴 or 喙, this cannot be descended from either character.)
house	*vuk7	屋
mountain	*san1	山
mountain	*liaŋ1	嶺
cooked rice	*fan6 / *pʰon6	飯
egg	*tšʰiun1	春
egg	*luon3	卵
egg	*tʰan3	蛋
meat	*ňiuk7	肉
wear (clothing)	*tšok7	著
stand	*kʰi1	企／徛
speak / talk	*koŋ3	講
speak / talk	*va6	話
know	*ti1 (*tek7)	知（得）
know	*hiau3 *tek7	曉得

== Bibliography ==
- Coblin, W. South (2019). Common Neo-Hakka: A Comparative Reconstruction. Language and linguistics Monograph Series 63. Taipei: Institute of Linguistics, Academia Sinica. ISBN 978-986-54-3228-7.
