= BWN =

BWN, BWn, or Bwn may refer to:

- Barddhaman Junction railway station, station code "BWN"
- Biografisch Woordenboek van Nederland
- Bloxwich North railway station, station code "BWN"
- Brunei International Airport, IATA airport code "BWN"
- Hm Nai language, ISO 639-3 code "bwn"
