= Hmongic languages =

Language family of China and Southeast Asia

Hmongic
- Miao
- Geographic distribution: China, Vietnam, Laos, Thailand
- Ethnicity: Miao people
- Linguistic classification: Hmong–Mien: Hmongic
- Proto-language: Proto-Hmongic
- Subdivisions: Bahengic; Sheic; West Hmongic (Chuanqiandian Miao); Xong (Western Hunan); Hmu (Eastern Guizhou); possibly other, unclassified branches

Language codes
- ISO 639-2 / 5: hmn
- ISO 639-3: hmn
- Glottolog: hmon1337
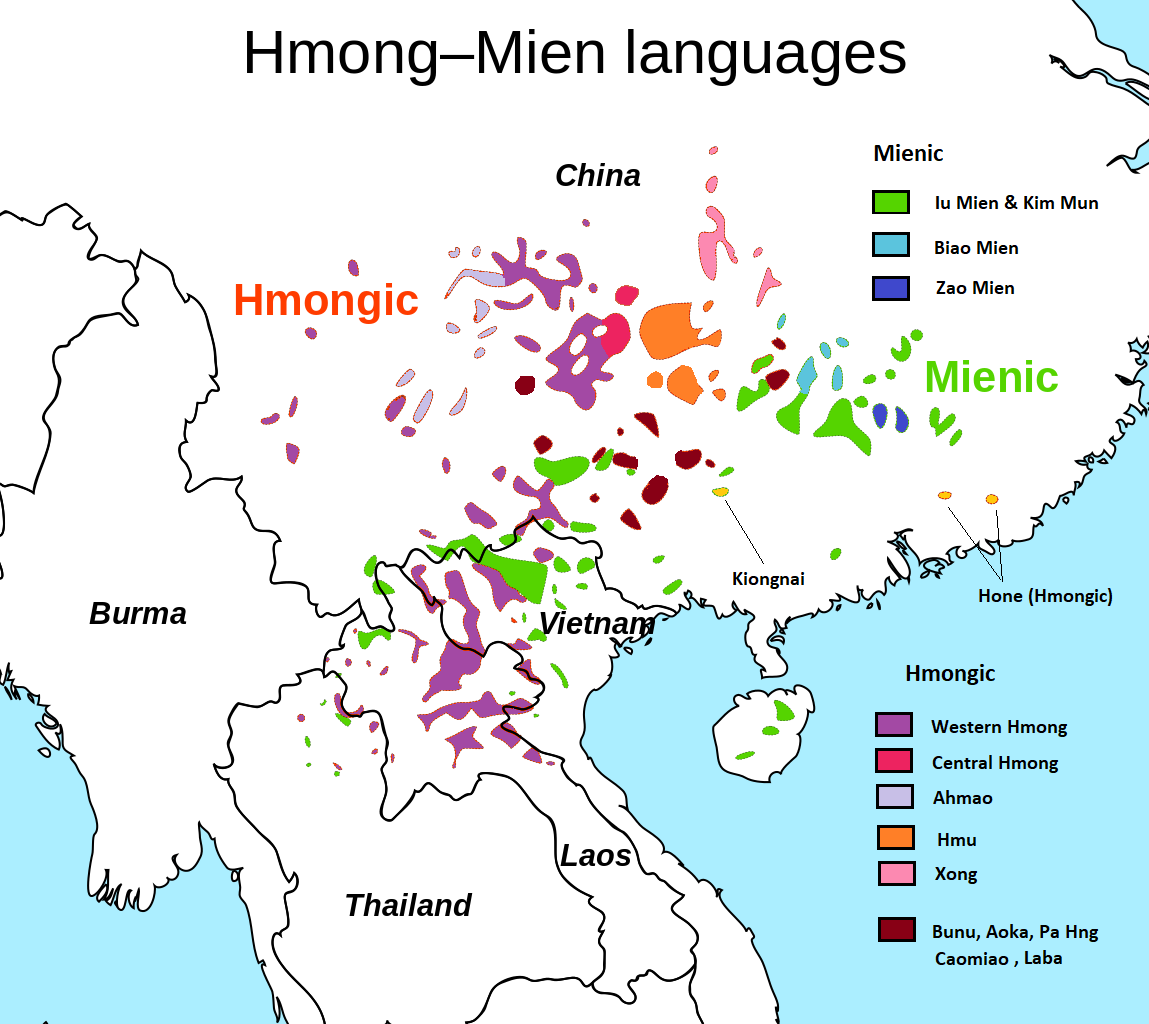
- Hmongic languages: West Hmongic A-Hmao Central (Gejia, A-Hmyo, Mashan, Huishui) Hmu / East Hmongic Xong / North Hmongic Divergent groups: Pa Hng, Bunu, Aoka, etc.

The Hmongic languages, also known as Miao languages (simplified Chinese: 苗语; traditional Chinese: 苗語; pinyin: Miáoyǔ), include the various languages spoken by the Miao people (such as Hmong, Hmu, and Xong). Hmongic languages also include various languages spoken by non-Mienic-speaking Yao people, such as Pa-Hng, Bunu, Jiongnai, Younuo, and others, while She is spoken by ethnic She people.

== Names ==
Miao (苗) is the Chinese name and the one used by Miao in China. However, Hmong is more familiar in the West, due to Hmong emigration. Hmong is the biggest subgroup within the Hmongic peoples. Many overseas Hmong prefer the name Hmong, and claim that Meo (a Southeast Asian language change from Miao) is both inaccurate and pejorative, though it is generally considered neutral by the Miao community in China.

Of the core Hmongic languages spoken by ethnic Miao, there are a number of overlapping names. The three branches are as follows, as named by Purnell (in English and Chinese), Ratliff, and scholars in China, as well as the descriptive names based on the patterns and colors of traditional dress:

Glottolog	Native name	Endonym	Purnell	Chinese name (geographical)	Chinese name (general)	Ratliff	Dress-color name
chua1248	Hmong	lol Hmongb	Sichuan–Guizhou–Yunnan Miao	川黔滇苗 Chuanqiandian Miao	Western Miao 苗语西部方言 / 苗語西部方言	West Hmongic	White, Blue/Green, etc.
larg1235	Ahmao (Note: Local Chinese for Flowery Miao. No common name. Miao speakers use forms like Hmong (Mong), Hmang (Mang), Hmao, Hmyo. Yao speakers use names based on Nu.)	ad Hmaob lul	Northeast Yunnan Miao	滇东北次苗 / 滇東北次苗 Diandongbeici Miao	Western Miao 苗语西部方言 / 苗語西部方言	West Hmongic	Flowery Miao (大花苗)
nort2748	Xong	dut Xongb	Western Hunan Miao	湘西苗 Xiangxi Miao	Eastern Miao 苗语东部方言 / 苗語東部方言	North Hmongic	Red Miao
east2369	Hmu	hveb Hmub	Eastern Guizhou Miao	黔东苗 Qiandong Miao	Central Miao 苗语中部方言 / 苗語中部方言	East Hmongic	Black Miao

The Hunan Province Gazetteer (1997) gives the following autonyms for various peoples in Hunan classified by the Chinese government as Miao.

- Xiangxi Prefecture: gho Xong (果雄), ghe Xong (仡熊), (guo Chu 果楚) [ceremonial]
  - Luxi County and Guzhang County: ghao So (缩), te Suang (爽)
- Jingzhou County, Huaihua: Hmu (目), (Nai Mu 乃目)
- Chengbu County, Shaoyang: Hmao (髳)

== Classification ==
Hmongic is one of the primary branches of the Hmong–Mien language family, with the other being Mienic. Hmongic is a diverse group of perhaps twenty languages, based on mutual intelligibility, but several of these are dialectically quite diverse in phonology and vocabulary, and are not considered to be single languages by their speakers. There are probably over thirty languages taking this into account. Four classifications are outlined below, though the details of the West Hmongic branch are left for that article.

Mo Piu, first documented in 2009, was reported by Geneviève Caelen-Haumont (2011) to be a divergent Hmongic language, and was later determined to be a dialect of Guiyang Miao. Similarly, Ná-Meo is not addressed in the classifications below, but is believed by Nguyễn (2007) to be closest to Hmu (Qiandong Miao).

=== Purnell (1970) ===
Purnell (1970) divided the Miao languages into Eastern, Northern, Central, and Western subgroups.

- Miao
  - Eastern
    - Jung-chiang (Rongjiang, in Gaotongzhai)
    - East A
      - Cheng-feng (Zhenfeng)
      - Tʻai-chiang (Taijiang, in Taigongzhai)
      - Lu-shan (Lushan, in Kaitang)
      - Kʻai-li (Kaili, in Yanghao 养蒿 / 養蒿)
      - Tai-kung (Daigong, in Shidongkou 石洞口)
  - Northern
    - Hua-yuan (Huayuan, in Jiwei 吉卫 / 吉衛)
  - Central
    - Kwei-chu
    - Lung-li (Longli, in Shuiwei)
  - Western
    - Wei-ning (Weining, in Shimenkan) = A Hmao
    - Kwang-shun (Guangshun, in Ke-cheng-chai)
    - West A
      - Hua-chieh (Bijie, in Dananshan 大南山)
      - Su-yung (Xuyong)
      - Tak
      - Petchabun

=== Strecker (1987) ===
Strecker's classification is as follows:

- Hmongic (Miao)
  - West Hunan = Xong = Xiangxi (Northern Hmongic)
  - East Guizhou = Mhu = Qiandong (Eastern Hmongic)
  - Pa Hng
  - Hm Nai = Wunai
  - Kiong Nai = Jiongnai
  - Yu Nuo = Younuo
  - Sichuan–Guizhou–Yunnan = Chuanqiangdian (Western Hmongic, including Bu–Nao) (See)

In a follow-up to that paper in the same publication, Strecker tentatively removed Pa-Hng, Wunai, Jiongnai, and Yunuo, positing that they may be independent branches of Miao–Yao, with the possibility that Yao was the first of these to branch off. Effectively, this means that Miao/Hmongic would consist of six branches: She (Ho-Nte), Pa-Hng, Wunai, Jiongnai, Yunuo, and everything else. In addition, the 'everything else' would include nine distinct but unclassified branches, which were not addressed by either Matisoff or Ratliff (see West Hmongic#Strecker).

=== Matisoff (2001) ===
Matisoff followed the basic outline of Strecker (1987), apart from consolidating the Bunu languages and leaving She unclassified:

- Hmongic (Miao)
  - Bunu
    - Younuo
    - Wunai
    - Bu–Nao: Pu No, Nao Klao, Nu Mhou, Nunu, Tung Nu
    - Jiongnai
  - Chuanqiangdian Miao (See)
  - Pa-Hng
  - Qiandong Miao (Hmu, 3 languages)
  - Xiangxi Miao (Xong, 2 languages)

=== Wang & Deng (2003) ===
Wang & Deng (2003) is one of the few Chinese sources which integrate the Bunu languages into Hmongic on purely linguistic grounds. They find the following pattern in the statistics of core Swadesh vocabulary:

- She
- (main branch)
  - (Hunan–Guangxi)
    - Jiongnai
    - (other)
      - Western Hunan (Northern Hmongic / Xong)
      - Younuo–Pa-Hng
  - (Guizhou–Yunnan)
    - Eastern Guizhou (Eastern Hmongic / Hmu)
    - (Western)
      - Bu–Nao
      - Western Hmongic
        - A-Hmao
        - Hmong

=== Matisoff (2006) ===
Matisoff (2006) outlined the following. Not all varieties are listed.

- Northern Hmong = West Hunan (Xong)
- Western Hmong (See)
- Central Hmong
  - Longli Miao
  - Guizhu
- Eastern Guizhou (Hmu)
  - Daigong
  - Kaili (= Northern)
  - Lushan
  - Taijiang (= Northern)
  - Zhenfeng (= Northern)
  - Phö
  - Rongjiang (= Southern)
- Patengic
  - Pateng
  - Yongcong

Matisoff also indicates Hmongic influence on Gelao in his outline.

=== Ratliff (2010) ===
The Hmongic classification below is from Martha Ratliff (2010:3).

- Hmongic (Miao)
  - Pa-Hng – 32,000 speakers
  - Main branch
    - Kiong Nai – 1,100 speakers
    - She – 910 speakers
    - Core Hmongic
      - West Hmongic (Chuanqiandian)
        - Hmong – 3,712,000 speakers
        - Gha-Mu - 84,000 speakers
        - A-Hmao – 300,000 speakers in Guizhou and Yunnan
        - Bu–Nao – 390,000 speakers in Guangxi
        - Gejia - 60,000 speakers
        - A-Hmyo - 61,000 speakers
        - Mashan - 140,000 speakers
        - Guiyang - 190,000 speakers
        - Huishui - 180,000 speakers
        - Pingtang - 24,000 speakers
      - Xong – 900,000 speakers mostly in Hunan
      - Hmu – 2,100,000 speakers mostly in Guizhou

Ratliff (2010) notes that Pa-Hng, Jiongnai, and Xong (North Hmongic) are phonologically conservative, as they retain many Proto-Hmongic features that have been lost in most other daughter languages. For instance, both Pa-Hng and Xong have vowel quality distinctions (and also tone distinctions in Xong) depending on whether or not the Proto-Hmong-Mien rime was open or closed. Both also retain the second part of Proto-Hmong-Mien diphthongs, which is lost in most other Hmongic languages, since they tend to preserve only the first part of Proto-Hmong-Mien diphthongs. Ratliff notes that the position of Xong (North Hmongic) is still quite uncertain. Since Xong preserves many archaic features not found in most other Hmongic languages, any future attempts at classifying the Hmong-Mien languages must also address the position of Xong.

=== Taguchi (2012) ===
Yoshihisa Taguchi's (2012, 2013) computational phylogenetic study classifies the Hmongic languages as follows.

- Hmongic
  - Pahngic
    - Pa Hng
  - Northern
    - Xong
  - Core Hmongic
    - Central
      - Hmu
    - Western
      - Hmong–Hmyo
        - Hmong
        - Hmyo
      - Pu Nu – Nao Klao
        - Pu Nu
        - Nao Klao
    - Eastern
      - Kiong Nai
      - Ho Ne – Pana
        - Ho Ne
        - Pana

=== Hsiu (2015, 2018) ===
Hsiu's (2015, 2018) computational phylogenetic study classifies the Hmongic languages as follows, based primarily on lexical data from Chen (2013).

- Hmongic
  - Pahengic
    - Pa Hng
    - Hm Nai
  - Xiongic
    - Western (Xiong)
    - Eastern (Suang)
  - Sheic
    - She–Jiongnai
    - Younuo
    - Pana
  - Hmuic
    - North-East
    - West (Raojia)
    - South
  - West Hmongic
    - Bu–Nao
      - Bunu
      - Nao Klao
      - Numao
    - Hmong (Chuanqiandian)
    - (various)

== Comparison ==
Numerals in Hmongic Languages
Language	One	Two	Three	Four	Five	Six	Seven	Eight	Nine	Ten
Proto-Hmong-Mien	*ʔɨ	*ʔu̯i	*pjɔu	*plei	*prja	*kruk	*dzjuŋH	*jat	*N-ɟuə	*ɡju̯əp
Pa-Hng (Gundong)	ji˩	wa˧˥	po˧˥	ti˧˥	tja˧˥	tɕu˥	tɕaŋ˦	ji˦˨	ko˧	ku˦˨
Wunai (Longhui)	i˧˥	ua˧˥	po˧˥	tsi˧˥	pia˧˥	tju˥	tɕa˨˩	ɕi˧˩	ko˧	kʰu˧˩
Younuo	je˨	u˧	pje˧	pwɔ˧	pi˧	tjo˧˥	sɔŋ˧˩	ja˨˩	kiu˩˧	kwə˨˩
Jiongnai	ʔi˥˧	u˦	pa˦	ple˦	pui˦	tʃɔ˧˥	ʃaŋ˨	ʑe˧˨	tʃu˧	tʃɔ˧˥
She (Chenhu)	i˧˥	u˨	pa˨	pi˧˥	pi˨	kɔ˧˩	tsʰuŋ˦˨	zi˧˥	kjʰu˥˧	kjʰɔ˧˥
Western Xong (Layiping)	ɑ˦	ɯ˧˥	pu˧˥	pʐei˧˥	pʐɑ˧˥	ʈɔ˥˧	tɕoŋ˦˨	ʑi˧	tɕo˧˩	ku˧
Eastern Xong (Xiaozhang)	a˧	u˥˧	pu˥˧	ɬei˥˧	pja˥˧	to˧	zaŋ˩˧	ʑi˧˥	ɡɯ˧˨	ɡu˧˥
Northern Qiandong Miao (Yanghao)	i˧	o˧	pi˧	l̥u˧	tsa˧	tʲu˦	ɕoŋ˩˧	ʑa˧˩	tɕə˥	tɕu˧˩
Southern Qiandong Miao (Yaogao)	tiŋ˨˦	v˩˧	pai˩˧	tl̥ɔ˩˧	tɕi˩˧	tju˦	tsam˨	ʑi˨˦	tɕu˧˩	tɕu˨˦
Pu No (Du'an)	i˦˥˦	aːɤ˦˥˦	pe˦˥˦	pla˦˥˦	pu˦˥˦	tɕu˦˨˧	saŋ˨˩˨	jo˦˨	tɕu˨	tɕu˦˨
Nao Klao (Nandan)	i˦˨	uɔ˦˨	pei˦˨	tlja˦˨	ptsiu˧	tɕau˧˨	sɒ˧˩	jou˥˦	tɕau˨˦	tɕau˥˦
Nu Mhou (Libo)	tɕy˧	yi˧	pa˧	tləu˧	pja˧	tjɤ˦	ɕoŋ˧˩	ja˧˨	tɕɤ˥	tɕɤ˧˨
Nunu (Linyun)	i˥˧	əu˥˧	pe˥˧	tɕa˥˧	pɤ˥˧	tɕu˨˧	ʂɔŋ˨	jo˨	tɕu˧˨	tɕu˨
Tung Nu (Qibainong)	i˥	au˧	pe˧	tɬa˧	pjo˧	ʈu˦˩	sɔŋ˨˩	ʑo˨˩	tɕu˩˧	tɕu˨˩
Pa Na	ʔa˧˩	ʔu˩˧	pa˩˧	tɬo˩˧	pei˩˧	kjo˧˥	ɕuŋ˨	ʑa˥˧	tɕʰu˧˩˧	tɕo˥˧
Hmong Shuat (Funing)	ʔi˥	ʔau˥	pʲei˥	plɔu˥	pʒ̩˥	tʃɔu˦	ɕaŋ˦	ʑi˨˩	tɕa˦˨	kɔu˨˩
Hmong Dleub (Guangnan)	ʔi˥	ʔɑu˥	pei˥	plou˥	tʃɹ̩˥	ʈɻou˦	ɕã˦	ʑi˨˩	tɕuɑ˦˨	kou˨˩
Hmong Nzhuab (Maguan)	ʔi˥˦	ʔau˦˧	pei˥˦	plou˥˦	tʃɹ̩˥˦	ʈou˦	ɕaŋ˦	ʑi˨	tɕuɑ˦˨	kou˨
Northeastern Dian Miao (Shimenkan)	i˥	a˥	tsɿ˥	tl̥au˥	pɯ˥	tl̥au˧	ɕaɯ˧	ʑʱi˧˩	dʑʱa˧˥	ɡʱau˧˩
Raojia	i˦	ɔ˦	poi˦	ɬɔ˦	pja˦	tju˧	ɕuŋ˨	ʑa˥˧	tɕa˥	tɕu˥˧
Xijia Miao (Shibanzhai)	i˥	u˧˩	pzɿ˧˩	pləu˧˩	pja˧˩	ʈo˨˦	zuŋ˨˦	ja˧	ja˧˩	ʁo˧˩
Gejia	i˧	a˧	tsɪ˧˩	plu˧	tsia˧	tɕu˥	saŋ˧˩	ʑa˩˧	tɕa˨˦	ku˩˧

== Writing ==
The Hmongic languages have been written with at least a dozen different scripts, none of which has been universally accepted among Hmong people as standard. Tradition has it that the ancestors of the Hmong, the Nanman, had a written language with a few pieces of significant literature. When the Han-era Chinese began to expand southward into the land of the Hmong, whom they considered barbarians, the script of the Hmong was lost, according to many stories. Allegedly, the script was preserved in the clothing. Attempts at revival were made by the creation of a script in the Qing Dynasty, but this was also brutally suppressed and no remnant literature has been found. Adaptations of Chinese characters have been found in Hunan, recently. However, this evidence and mythological understanding is disputed. For example, according to linguist S. Robert Ramsey, there was no writing system among the Miao until the missionaries created them. It is currently unknown for certain whether or not the Hmong had a script historically.

Around 1905, Samuel Pollard introduced the Pollard script, for the A-Hmao language, an abugida inspired by Canadian Aboriginal syllabics, by his own admission. Several other syllabic alphabets were designed as well, the most notable being Shong Lue Yang's Pahawh Hmong script, which originated in Laos for the purpose of writing Hmong Daw, Hmong Njua, and other dialects of the standard Hmong language.

In the 1950s, pinyin-based Latin alphabets were devised by the Chinese government for three varieties of Miao: Xong, Hmu, and Chuangqiandian (Hmong), as well as a Latin alphabet for A-Hmao to replace the Pollard script (now known as "Old Miao"), though Pollard remains popular. This meant that each of the branches of Miao in the classification of the time had a separate written standard. Wu and Yang (2010) believe that standards should be developed for each of the six other primary varieties of Chuangqiandian as well, although the position of romanization in the scope of Hmong language preservation remains a debate. Romanization remains common in China and the United States, while versions of the Lao and Thai scripts remain common in Thailand and Laos.

Nyiakeng Puachue Hmong script was created by Reverend Chervang Kong Vang to be able to capture Hmong vocabulary clearly and also to remedy redundancies in the language as well as address semantic confusions that was lacking in other scripts. This was created in the 1980s and was mainly used by United Christians Liberty Evangelical Church, a church also founded by Vang. The script bears strong resemblance to the Lao alphabet in structure and form and characters inspired from the Hebrew alphabets, although the characters themselves are different.

== Mixed languages ==
Due to intensive language contact, there are several language varieties in China which are thought to be mixed Miao–Chinese languages or Sinicized Miao. These include:

- Lingling (Linghua) of northern Guangxi
- The Maojia dialect (also called Aoka or Qingyi Miao) of Chengbu Miao Autonomous County, Hunan (located near Pana-speaking villages), and Ziyuan County and Longsheng Various Nationalities Autonomous County, Guangxi.
- Badong Yao (八峒瑶 / 八峒瑤) of Xinning County, Hunan
- Laba (喇叭) more than 200,000 in Qinglong, Shuicheng, Pu'an, and Panxian in Guizhou; a variety of Old Xiang (also called Lou-Shao 娄邵片 / 婁邵片). The people are also called Huguangren 湖广人 / 湖廣人, because they claim their ancestors had migrated from Huguang (modern-day Hunan and Hubei).
- Baishi Miao (白市苗) of Baishi District, Tianzhu County, eastern Guizhou, possibly a mixed Chinese and Miao (Hmu) language

In southwestern Hunan, divergent Sinitic language varieties spoken by Miao and Yao peoples include:

- Guanxia Pinghua (关峡平话 / 關峽平話), spoken by ethnic Miao in Suining County, Hunan. Non-Sinitic substrate words include kəu213 'egg'.
- Yangshi Pinghua (羊石平话 / 羊石平話), spoken by ethnic Miao in Chengbu County, Hunan. Non-Sinitic substrate words include ko11 'egg'.
- Lanrong (兰蓉人话 / 蘭蓉人話), spoken by ethnic Miao in Chengbu County, Hunan
- Wutuan (五团人话 / 五團人話), spoken by ethnic Miao in Chengbu County, Hunan
- Malin (麻林人话 / 麻林人話), spoken by ethnic Yao in Xinning County, Hunan
- Niutou (牛头人话 / 牛頭人話), spoken by ethnic Miao in Longsheng County, Guangxi

== See also ==
- Proto-Hmong-Mien reconstructions (Wiktionary)
- Proto-Hmongic reconstructions (Wiktionary)
- Hmong-Mien comparative vocabulary list (Wiktionary)
