= Pa Na language =

Hmongic language spoken in China

Pa Na
- pa˥˧ na˧˩˧
- Pronunciation: [pa˥˧ na˧˩˧]
- Native to: China
- Region: Hunan
- Native speakers: (1,000 cited 1993)
- Language family: Hmong–Mien: Hmongic; Sheic; Pana–She or Kiong Nai–She–Pana?; Pa Na

Language codes
- ISO 639-3: None (mis)
- Glottolog: pana1310

Pa Na (Chinese: 巴那语; pinyin: Bānàyǔ; autonym: pa˥˧ na˧˩˧) is a Hmongic language spoken by about 1,000 people in Shangpai (上排), Zhongpai (中排), and Xiapai (下排) of Chengbu County, and Huangshuangping (黄双坪), Suining County in Hunan, China. It is also called "Red Miao". Yoshihisa Taguchi (2012) considers Pa Na to be most closely related to She and Jiongnai.

Yoshihisa Taguchi (2001) documents the Xiapai (下排) dialect of Pa Na. Hu (2018:14-17) briefly documents the Pa Na dialect of Tanni Village No. 2 (潭泥村二组), Huangsangping Ethnic Miao Township (黄桑坪苗族乡; currently part of Zhaishi Township 寨市苗族侗族乡), Suining County.

== Phonology ==
Consonant phonemes
	Labial		Alveolar		Lateral		Post- alveolar		Velar		Glottal
Nasal		m		n						ŋ	
Stop	p	b	t	d					k	ɡ	ʔ
Affricate			ts	dz	tɬ	dɮ	tɕ	dʑ			
Fricative	f	v	s	z	ɬ	ɮ	ɕ	ʑ			h
Approximant						l					

Vowel phonemes
	Front		Central		Back	
	short	long	short	long	short	long
Close	ɪ	iː			ʊ	uː
Mid	ɛ	eː	ə	əː	ɔ	oː
Open			a	aː		

== Distribution ==
According to the Suining County Gazetteer (1997:657), in Suining County, Pa Na (坝哪话, autonym: pᴀ25 nᴀ22 tɕi45; exonym: known as Zhaishanghua 寨上话 by the locals), is spoken by no more than 3,000 people in Tanni (潭泥), Moshi (磨石), Chiban (赤板), Jiexi (界溪), Shangbao (上堡), and other villages, all located in the southern part of Huangshuangping Township (黄双坪乡; currently part of Zhaishi Township 寨市苗族侗族乡).

Taguchi (2001: 83) reports that Pana is spoken by about 1,100 people in the following five villages of Yanzhai Township (岩寨乡), Chengbu County, Hunan.

- Shangpai (上排村)
- Xiapai (下排村)
- Desheng (得胜村)
- Liuma (六马村)
- Changxing (长兴村)

== See also ==
- Pana word list (Wiktionary)
