= Linglinghua =

Mixed Mandarin–Miao dialect of Guangxi, China

Lingling
- Linghua
- liŋ55 va33
- Pronunciation: [liŋ˥ va˧]
- Native to: China
- Region: Guangxi
- Ethnicity: Miao
- Native speakers: (20,000 cited 1991)
- Language family: mixed Mandarin–Miao

Language codes
- ISO 639-3: None (mis)
- Glottolog: None

Lingling (Chinese: Linghua 伶话 Línghuà or Lingling hua; Lingling: liŋ˥ va˧) is an unclassified mixed Chinese language. It is spoken by 20,000 ethnic Miao in Longsheng County, Guangxi. It is only spoken within the community; with outsiders, Southwestern Mandarin is spoken.

He (2009) covers the Linghua dialect of Taiping (太平村), Pingdeng Township (平等乡), Longsheng County, Guangxi.

A description of the Taipingtang 太平塘村 dialect of Linghua can be found in Wang (2014).

== Phonology ==
=== Consonants ===
Consonants
		Labial	Alveolar		Retroflex	Alveolo-palatal	Velar
		Labial	plain	lateral	Retroflex	Alveolo-palatal	Velar
Plosive/Affricate	plain	p	t	tɬ	tʂ	tɕ	k
Plosive/Affricate	aspirated	pʰ	tʰ	tɬʰ	tʂʰ	tɕʰ	kʰ
Plosive/Affricate	voiced	b	d	dl		dʑ	g
Nasal		m	n				ŋ
Fricative		f	s	ɬ		ɕ	h
Approximant		w		l			

=== Vowels ===
	Front		Central	Back
Close	i	y		u
Mid			ə	ɔ
Open	a			

=== Tones ===
Tones
Tone category	Tone value
A1	˥ (5)
A2	˨ (2)
B1	˧ (3)
B2	˦ (4)
C	˦ (4)
D	˨ (2)

== Vocabulary ==
This section lists sample vocabulary in Linghua from Wang (2014). Translated English glosses have also been provided.

=== Pronouns ===
	sg.	pl.
1st person	ŋa˧	ŋai˧
2nd person	ŋ̍˧	ŋ̍˧liɛ˥
3rd person	tʰa˥, i˥	i˥liɛ˥

=== Numerals ===
Numeral	Linghua
1	i˨
2	ni˦
3	ɬa˥
4	ɬi˦
5	ŋ̍˧
6	liu˨
7	tɬʰi˨
8	pia˨
9	tɕiu˧
10	dl̩˨

=== Nature ===
Chinese gloss	English gloss	Linghua
天	sky	tʰiɛ˥
太阳	sun	ni˨dau˨/˥
月亮	moon	wei˨liɔ˦
星星	star	ɬiɛ˥liɛ˧
云	cloud	uŋ˨wu˦
雨	rain	u˧
风	wind	puŋ˥
山	mountain	ɬai˥
田	field	diɛ˨

=== Body parts ===
Chinese gloss	English gloss	Linghua
头	head	dau˨
头发	hair (of head)	dau˨pei˨/˥
脸	face	miɛ˦
耳朵	ear	niɛ˧tɔ˧
眼睛	eye	ŋai˧tɬiɛ˥
鼻子	nose	bi˨haŋ˧
嘴	mouth	hau˧
舌头	tongue	iɛ˨liɛ˧
牙齿	tooth	ŋa˨tɬʰl̩˧
脖子	neck	tɕiɛ˧kuai˧
肩	shoulder	kai˥dau˨
脊背	back	pei˦
手	hand	ɕiu˧
脚	leg, foot	tɕiɔ˨
心	heart	ɬiŋ˥
肉	meat, flesh	nai˦
皮	skin	bi˨
骨头	bone	gy˧
左	left (side)	tɬɔ˧
右	right (side)	iu˦
