= Maojia language =

Mixed language of Southern China

Maojia
- 猫家 mau55 ka55
- Pronunciation: [mau˥ ka˥]
- Native to: China
- Region: Hunan, Guangxi
- Ethnicity: Miao
- Native speakers: (200,000 cited 1991)
- Language family: mixed Chinese–Miao

Language codes
- ISO 639-3: None (mis)
- Glottolog: None

Maojia (猫家 mau55 ka55) is a mixed language in Southern China. Maojiahua is an unclassified Sinitic language that has undergone influence from Hmongic languages.

== Demographics ==
Maojiahua is spoken by about 200,000 people of Au-Ka (Aoka 奥卡) Miao ethnicity in Chengbu, Suining, Wugang and Suining in southwest part of Hunan Province, as well as in Ziyuan and Longsheng in the northern part of Guangxi Province.

According to Chen Qiguang (2013:32), "Maojia" (mau55 ka55), also known as "Qingyi Miao 青衣苗", is spoken mostly in Chengbu County, Hunan, and also in Suining, Wugang, Longsheng, and Ziyuan counties. There is a total of about 120,000 speakers. The representative dialect given in Chen (2013) is that of Xintang Village 信塘村, Yangshi Township 羊石乡, Chengbu Miao Autonomous County, Hunan Province. Li (2004) covers various dialects of Qingyi Miao in detail.

== Vocabulary ==
Below are selected words of likely non-Chinese origin from the Qingyi Miao dialect of Wutuan Town 五团镇, Chengbu County 城步县, Hunan (Li 2004).

English gloss	Chinese gloss	Qingyi Miao
eat	吃	y²¹
oil	油	lu⁵²
meat	肉	nai⁴⁴
pig	猪	te⁵⁵
small	小	nɑ⁵⁵
child	孩子	nɑŋ⁵⁵li³²
nose	鼻子	pi⁵²haŋ²¹³
spider	蜘蛛	kiou⁵⁵ɕi⁵⁵
bedbug	臭虫	pie⁵⁵
star	星星	se⁵⁵le³²
dust	灰尘	tʰoŋ⁵⁵din⁴⁴
this	这	ko²¹
that	那	mi⁴⁴
one	一	ɑ⁴⁴
thick (of soup)	稠	no⁵²
hidden, secret	密	nin²¹³
earthworm	蚯蚓	din²¹kai³²
sponge gourd (Luffa aegyptiaca)	丝瓜	se³²tai⁵⁵kuɑ⁵⁵
infant	婴幼儿	naŋ⁵⁵le³²
outsider	外地人	lai⁵²tɕie²¹³ŋ⁴⁴
son	儿子	naŋ⁵⁵li³², naŋ⁵⁵tsai³²
spit	吐	ia⁵²
vagina	女阴	tsɿ⁵⁵
do	做	niɑŋ⁵²
excrement	屎	kai²¹³
squat, kneel	蹲	nioŋ⁵⁵
concave	凹	mie²¹
thin (of person)	廋	tse⁵⁵
