= Hm Nai language =

Hmongic language spoken in China

Hm Nai
- Wunai
- Ng-nai
- Native to: China
- Region: Hunan
- Ethnicity: 8,000 (2007)
- Native speakers: 5,800 (2002)
- Language family: Hmong–Mien: Hmongic; Bahengic; Hm Nai

Language codes
- ISO 639-3: bwn
- Glottolog: wuna1248
- ELP: Wunai Bunu
- Hm Nai is classified as Definitely Endangered by the UNESCO Atlas of the World's Languages in Danger.

Hm Nai (Mandarin: Wunai (唔奈 Wúnài), Cantonese: Ng-nai) is a Hmong-Mien language spoken in western Hunan province, China. There are approximately 5800 people speaking this language, and the number is decreasing. Mao & Li (1997) determined it to be closely related to the Pa-Hng language.

== Distribution ==
Hm Nai is spoken in:

- Longhui County: in Huxingshan 虎形山乡, Xiaoshajiang 小沙江乡, Motang 磨塘乡, Dashuitian 大水田乡. The Huxingshan 虎形山乡 dialect is the best documented variety, since it is typically used as the representative datapoint for Hm Nai.
- Xupu County
- Chenxi County
- Dongkou County
- Chengbu County
- Xinning County

== Bibliography ==
- Mao, Zongwu 毛宗武; Li, Yunbing 李云兵 (1997). Bāhēngyǔ yánjiū 巴哼语研究 [A Study of Baheng [Pa-Hng]] (in Chinese). Shanghai: Shanghai yuandong chubanshe.
- Meng, Chaoji 蒙朝吉 (2001). Yáozú Bùnǔyǔ fāngyán yánjiū 瑤族布努语方言研究 [A Study of the Bunu Dialects of the Yao People] (in Chinese). Beijing: Minzu chubanshe.
- Yang, Zaibiao 杨再彪. 2016. Munaiyu yanjiu 呣奈语研究. Ph.D. dissertation. Changsha: Hunan Normal University 湖南师范大学.
