= Xong language =

Hmongic language of south-central China

Xong
- Xiangxi Miao
- Dut Xonb
- Pronunciation: [tu˥˧ɕõ˧˥]
- Native to: China
- Region: Hunan, Guizhou, Hubei, Guangxi and Chongqing
- Ethnicity: Qo Xiong
- Native speakers: ~900,000 (2005)
- Language family: Hmong–Mien: Hmongic; Core Hmongic; Xong
- Dialects: Western (Xong proper); Eastern (Suang)
- Writing system: Latin

Language codes
- ISO 639-3: Either: mmr – Western Xiangxi Miao muq – Eastern Xiangxi Miao
- Glottolog: nort2748

The Xong language (Dut Xonb [tu53 ɕõ35]) is the northernmost Hmongic language, spoken in south-central China by around 0.9 million people. It is called Xiangxi Miaoyu (湘西苗语, "Western Hunan Miao") in Chinese, as well as Eastern Miao (东部苗语). In Western sources, it has been called Meo, Red Miao, and North Hmongic. An official alphabet was adopted in 1956.

== Distribution ==
Xong is spoken mainly in Hunan province, but also in a few areas of Guizhou and Hubei provinces, Guangxi, and Chongqing municipality in China. Xong-speaking communities, by county, are:

- Western (Xong): 800,000 speakers (autonym qɔ35 ɕoŋ35)
  - Hunan
    - Huayuan County, Xiangxi
    - Jishou, Xiangxi
    - Fenghuang County, Xiangxi
    - Baojing County, Xiangxi
    - Longshan County, Xiangxi
    - Xinhuang Dong Autonomous County, Huaihua
    - Mayang Miao Autonomous County, Huaihua
  - Guizhou
    - Songtao Miao Autonomous County
    - Tongren County
  - Hubei
    - Xuan'en County
  - Chongqing
    - Xiushan Tujia and Miao Autonomous County, Qianjiang
    - Youyang Tujia and Miao Autonomous County, Qianjiang
  - Guangxi
    - Hechi (including Beiya 坝牙村 of Xia'ao 下坳乡, Yong'an 永安乡, and Banling 板岭乡 of Du'an County)
    - Nandan County
- Eastern (Suang): 80,000 speakers
  - Hunan
    - Jishou, Xiangxi (e.g., in Xiaozhangzhai 小章寨, with autonym qɯ22 suɑŋ53)
    - Longshan County, Xiangxi (e.g., in Wujiazhai 吴家寨)
    - Guzhang County, Xiangxi
    - Luxi County, Xiangxi (e.g., in Dongtouzhai 洞头寨, with autonym tei53 sou53)

== Classification ==
Xong was classified in its own branch of the Hmongic family in Strecker (1987). Xiang (1999) divided Xong into western and eastern dialects. Matisoff (2001) considered these to be two distinct languages, but Matisoff (2006) consolidated them into one. Yang (2004) divides each of these dialects into three subdialects, as listed below. Speaker populations and locations are from Li and Li (2012).

- Western (includes standardized Xong)
  - Lect 1 (autonym: qo35 ɕoŋ35): Jiwei 吉卫, Huayuan County; 769,000 speakers in the counties of Fenghuang (except Baren 叭仁乡), most of Huayuan, southern Jishou, Xinhuang, Mayang, Songtao, parts of Rongjiang, parts of Ziyun, Xiushan, parts of Nandan, parts of Hechi, and parts of Du'an.
  - Lect 2 (autonym: qo54 ɕoŋ54): Yangmeng 阳孟, Jishou; 120,000 speakers in the counties of eastern Huayuan, western and northern Jishou, eastern Baojing, southwestern Guzhang, Fenghuang (in Baren 叭仁乡), and Xuan'en.
  - Lect 3 (autonym: o55 ɕaŋ55): Zhongxin 中心, Baojing County; 30,000 speakers in southeastern Baojing County.
- Eastern
  - Lect 4 (autonym: te53 suɑŋ53): Xiaozhang 小章, Luxi County; 6,000 speakers in and around Xiaozhang, Luxi County
  - Lect 5 (autonym: ɡɔ35 sɤ53): Danqing 丹青, Jishou; 48,000 speakers in the counties of northwestern Luxi, eastern Jishou, and southeastern Guzhang.
  - Lect 6 (autonym: bja22 sã44 nɤ44): Dengshang 蹬上, Longshan County; 300 speakers in southern Longshan County and Yongshun County (in Shouche 首车乡).

He Fuling (2009) describes a western Qo Xiong dialect of Gouliang Ethnic Miao Village, Ala Township, Fenghuang County (凤凰县阿拉镇勾良苗寨).

Chen (2009) describes a western Qo Xiong dialect of Daxing Town 大兴镇, Songtao County, Guizhou.

== Phonology and script ==
A written standard based on the Western dialect in Làyǐpíng (腊乙坪) village and Jíwèi (吉卫) town, Huāyuán county, Xiangxi Tujia and Miao Autonomous Prefecture was established in 1956.

Xong Consonant Phonemes
		Labial			Alveolar			Retroflex	(Alveolo-) palatal		Velar		Uvular		Glottal	
		plain	pal.	app.	plain	pal.	aff.	Retroflex	plain	aff.	plain	lab.	plain	lab.	plain	lab.
Nasal	voiced	m	mʲ	mʴ	n			ɳ	ɲ		ŋ	ŋʷ				
Nasal	aspirated	m̥ʰ			n̥ʰ											
Stop/ Affricate	voiceless	p	pʲ	pʴ	t		ts	ʈ	c	tɕ	k	kʷ	q	qʷ		
Stop/ Affricate	aspirated	pʰ	pʲʰ	pʴʰ	tʰ		tsʰ	ʈʰ	cʰ	tɕʰ	kʰ	kʷʰ	qʰ	qʷʰ		
Stop/ Affricate	prenasal	ᵐp			ⁿt		ⁿts	ᶯʈ	ᶮc	ᶮtɕ	ᵑk	ᵑkʷ	ᶰq	ᶰqʷ		
Stop/ Affricate	prenasal asp.	ᵐpʰ		ᵐpʴʰ	ⁿtʰ		ⁿtsʰ	ᶯʈʰ	ᶮcʰ	ᶮtɕʰ	ᵑkʰ	ᵑkʷʰ	ᶰqʰ	ᶰqʷʰ		
Fricative	voiceless	f			s			ʂ	ɕ						h	hʷ
Fricative	voiced							ʐ	ʑ							
Approximant	voiced	w			l	lʲ										
Approximant	aspirated				l̥ʰ	l̥ʲʰ										

Xong Vowel Phonemes
	Front	Central	Back	
Close	i		ɯ	u
Mid	e		ɤ	o
Open-mid	ɛ		ɔ	
Open		a	ɑ	

Xong Consonant Orthography
p	⟨b⟩	pʰ	⟨p⟩	ᵐp	⟨nb⟩	mpʰ	⟨np⟩			m	⟨m⟩	m̥ʰ	⟨hm⟩
pʴ	⟨bl⟩	pɹʰ	⟨pl⟩			mpɹʰ	⟨npl⟩			mʴ	⟨ml⟩		
t	⟨d⟩	tʰ	⟨t⟩	ⁿt	⟨nd⟩	ntʰ	⟨nt⟩	l̥ʰ	⟨hl⟩	n	⟨n⟩	n̥ʰ	⟨hn⟩
ts	⟨z⟩	tsʰ	⟨c⟩	ⁿts	⟨nz⟩	ntsʰ	⟨nc⟩	s	⟨s⟩	f	⟨f⟩		
tɕ	⟨j⟩	tɕʰ	⟨q⟩	ᶮtɕ	⟨nj⟩	ntɕʰ	⟨nq⟩	ɕ	⟨x⟩	ʑ	⟨y⟩		
ʈ	⟨zh⟩	ʈʰ	⟨ch⟩	ᶯʈ	⟨nzh⟩	ɳʈʰ	⟨nch⟩	ʂ	⟨sh⟩	ʐ	⟨r⟩	ɳ	⟨nh⟩
k	⟨g⟩	kʰ	⟨k⟩	ᵑk	⟨ngg⟩	ŋkʰ	⟨nk⟩						
q	⟨gh⟩	qʰ	⟨kh⟩	ᶰq	⟨ngh⟩	ɴqʰ	⟨nkh⟩						
w	⟨w⟩	h	⟨h⟩										

Xong Vowel Orthography
		i	⟨i⟩	u	⟨u⟩
		iu	⟨iu⟩		
ɑ	⟨a⟩	iɑ	⟨ia⟩	uɑ	⟨ua⟩
o	⟨o⟩	io	⟨io⟩		
e	⟨e⟩	ie	⟨ie⟩	ue	⟨ue⟩
ei	⟨ei⟩			uei	⟨ui⟩
a	⟨ea⟩	ia	⟨iea⟩	ua	⟨uea⟩
ɔ	⟨ao⟩	iɔ	⟨iao⟩		
ɤ	⟨eu⟩	iɤ	⟨ieu⟩	uɤ	⟨ueu⟩
ɯ	⟨ou⟩	iɯ	⟨iou⟩	uɯ	⟨uou⟩
ɛ	⟨an⟩	iɛ	⟨ian⟩	uɛ	⟨uan⟩
en	⟨en⟩	ien	⟨in⟩	uen	⟨un⟩
ɑŋ	⟨ang⟩	iɑŋ	⟨iang⟩	uɑŋ	⟨uang⟩
oŋ	⟨ong⟩	ioŋ	⟨iong⟩		

Tones
Tone	IPA	Letter
high rising, 45	˦˥	⟨b⟩
low falling, 21	˨˩	⟨x⟩
high, 4	˦	⟨d⟩
low, 2	˨	⟨l⟩
high falling, 53	˥˧	⟨t⟩
falling, 42	˦˨	⟨s⟩
