= She people =

Ethnic minority in China

She, Shanke
畲族, 山客人
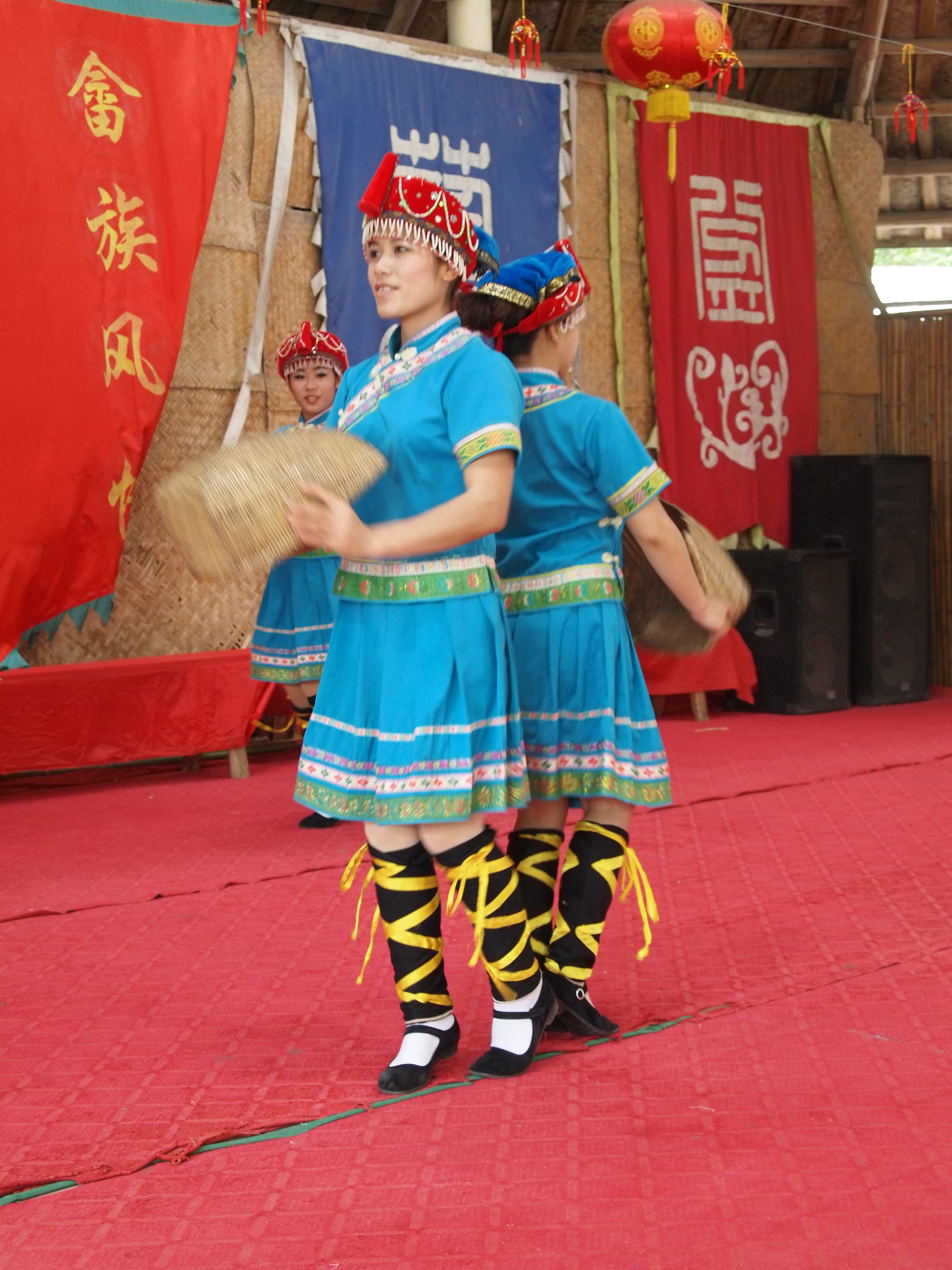
- She traditional dance performance in Huanglongyan (黄龙岩), Heyuan, Guangdong

Total population
- 746,385 (2020)

Regions with significant populations
- China (Fujian, Zhejiang, Jiangxi, Guangdong, Anhui)

Languages
- Predominantly Shanke dialect, Standard Chinese (lingua franca) and other Chinese varieties. A minuscule minority speak the She language in Zengcheng, Boluo County, Huidong County and Haifeng County in Guangdong Province.

Religion
- She indigenous religion (She Wuism), Buddhism

Related ethnic groups
- Yao, Miao, Hakka, Teochew and other Han

She people
- Chinese: 畲族
Transcriptions
Standard Mandarin
- Hanyu Pinyin: Shēzú
Wu
- Romanization: so zoh
Hakka
- Romanization: Tshiâ-tshu̍k
Southern Min
- Hokkien POJ: Siâ-cho̍k
- Teochew Peng'im: Siâ-tsôk
Eastern Min
- Fuzhou BUC: Siă-cŭk

The She people (Chinese: 畲族; pinyin: shēzú; Pha̍k-fa-sṳ: chhiàchhu̍k), self-identified as Shanke people (Chinese: 山客人; pinyin: shānkèrén; lit. 'mountain guest people (i.e. Hakka people)'; Pha̍k-fa-sṳ: sânhakngìn), colloquially known as Shanha people (Chinese: 山哈人; pinyin: shānhǎrén), (Note: "哈" is the phonetic loan Chinese character for "客" of "客家 (Hakka)") are an ethnic group native to southern China. They form one of the 56 ethnic groups officially recognized by the People's Republic of China.

According to the 2021 China Statistical Yearbook, the total population of the She was 746,385, including 403,516 males and 342,869 females. The She are the largest ethnic minority in Fujian, Zhejiang, and Jiangxi provinces. They are also present in the provinces of Anhui and Guangdong. Some descendants of the She also exist amongst the Hakka community in Taiwan.

== Languages ==
Today, over 400,000 She people of Fujian, Zhejiang, and Jiangxi provinces speak Shanke dialect (山客话; Shānkèhuà), an unclassified Chinese variety that has been heavily influenced by Hakka Chinese.

There are approximately 1,200 She people in Guangdong province who speak a Hmong–Mien language called She (畲语; Shēyǔ), which is also called Ho Ne meaning "mountain people" (Chinese: 活聂; pinyin: huóniè). Some say they are descendants of the Dongyi, Nanman, or Yue peoples.

Shanke dialect should not be confused with She (Ho Ne). Shanke (Shānkèhuà) and Ho Ne (Shēyǔ) speakers have separate histories and identities, although both are officially classified by the Chinese government as She people. The Dongjia of Majiang County, Guizhou are also officially classified as She people, but speak a Western Hmongic language closely related to Chong'anjiang Miao (重安江苗语).

== History ==
Some scholars believe that the birthplace of the She ethnic group may be Phoenix Mountain (凤凰山) in the north of Chao'an District, Chaozhou. The She people are some of the earliest known settlers of Guangdong; they are thought to have originally settled along the shallow shore for easier fishing access during the Neolithic era. Eventually, after an influx of Yue people moved south during the Warring States period, serious competition between the two peoples for resources developed.

From the time of the Qin dynasty on, waves of migrants from northern China have had a serious impact on the She people. Because they possessed superior tools and technology, these migrants were able to displace the She and occupy the better land for farming. As a result of this, some of the She were forced to relocate into the hilly areas of the Jiangxi and Fujian provinces.

Following this relocation, the She people became hillside farmers. Their methods of farming included burning grasses on the slope, casting rice seeds on those embers and then harvesting the produce following the growth season. Some of the She people also participated in the production and trade of salt, obtained from the evaporation of local pools of salt water.

Many conflicts took place between the Han Chinese and She peoples. For example, in one incident, She salt producers on Lantau Island in Hong Kong attacked the city of Canton in a revolt during the Song dynasty.

During the Ming-Qing dynasties they moved into and settled Zhejiang's southern region and mountain districts in the Lower Yangtze region, after they left their homeland in Northern Fujian. It is theorized that the She were pushed out of their land by the Hakka, which caused them to move into Zhejiang.

== Autonomous counties and ethnic townships in China ==
=== Zhejiang ===
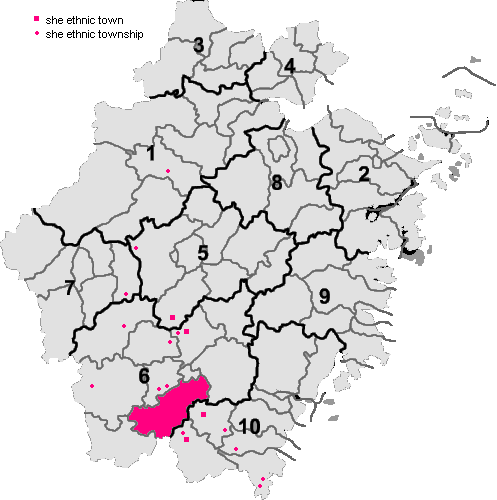
She ethnic county, townships and towns in Zhejiang

==== Hangzhou ====
- Eshan She Ethnic Township (莪山畲族乡) in Tonglu County

==== Quzhou ====
- Muchen She Ethnic Township (沐尘畲族乡) in Longyou County

==== Jinhua ====
- Shuiting She Ethnic Township (水亭畲族乡) in Lanxi City
- Liucheng She Ethnic Town (柳城畲族镇) in Wuyi County

==== Wenzhou ====
- Qingjie She Ethnic Township (青街畲族乡) in Pingyang County
- Xikeng She Ethnic Town (西坑畲族镇) in Wencheng County
- Zhoushan She Ethnic Township (周山畲族乡) in Wencheng County
- Fengyang She Ethnic Township (凤阳畲族乡) in Cangnan County
- Dailing She Ethnic Township (岱岭畲族乡) in Cangnan County
- Siqian She Ethnic Town (司前畲族镇) in Taishun County
- Zhuli She Ethnic Township (竹里畲族乡) in Taishun County

==== Lishui ====
- Jingning She Autonomous County (景宁畲族自治县)
- Laozhu She Ethnic Town (老竹畲族镇) in Liandu District
- Lixin She Ethnic Township (丽新畲族乡) in Liandu District
- Wuxi She Ethnic Township (雾溪畲族乡) in Yunhe County
- Anxi She Ethnic Township (安溪畲族乡) in Yunhe County
- Zhuyang She Ethnic Township (竹垟畲族乡) in Longquan City
- Sanren She Ethnic Township (三仁畲族乡) in Suichang County
- Banqiao She Ethnic Township (板桥畲族乡) in Songyang County

=== Anhui ===
==== Xuancheng ====
- Yunti She Ethnic Township (云梯畲族乡) in Ningguo City

=== Fujian ===
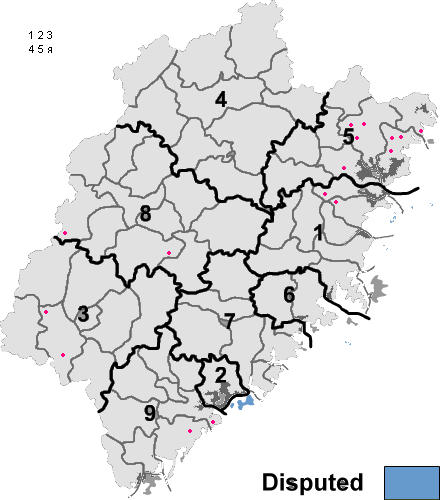
She ethnic townships in Fujian

==== Fuzhou ====
- Xiaocang She Ethnic Township (小沧畲族乡) in Lianjiang County
- Huoko She Ethnic Township (霍口畲族乡) in Luoyuan County

==== Ningde ====
- Muyun She Ethnic Township (穆云畲族乡) in Fu'an City
- Kangcuo She Ethnic Township (康厝畲族乡) in Fu'an City
- Banzhong She Ethnic Township (坂中畲族乡) in Fu'an City
- Xiamen She Ethnic Township (硖门畲族乡) in Fuding City
- Yantian She Ethnic Township (盐田畲族乡) in Xiapu County
- Shuimen She Ethnic Township (水门畲族乡) in Xiapu County
- Chongru She Ethnic Township (崇儒畲族乡) in Xiapu County

==== Zhangzhou ====
- Longjiao She Ethnic Township (隆教畲族乡) in Longhai City
- Huxi She Ethnic Township (湖西畲族乡) in Zhangpu County
- Chiling She Ethnic Township (赤岭畲族乡) in Zhangpu County

==== Longyan ====
- Gongzhuang She Ethnic Township (宫庄畲族乡) in Shanghang County
- Lufeng She Ethnic Township (庐丰畲族乡) in Shanghang County

=== Jiangxi ===
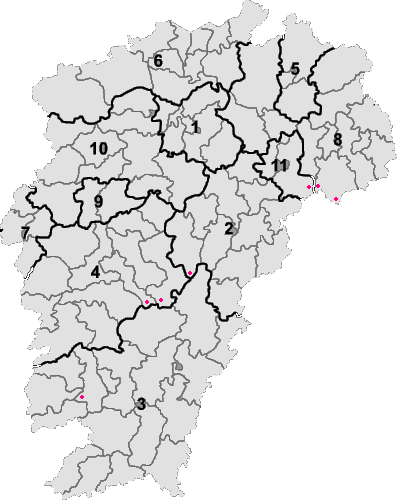
She ethnic townships in Jiangxi

==== Shangrao ====
- Taiyuan She Ethnic Township (太源畲族乡) in Yanshan County
- Huangbi She Ethnic Township (篁碧畲族乡) in Yanshan County

==== Yingtan ====
- Zhangping She Ethnic Township (樟坪畲族乡) in Guixi City

==== Fuzhou ====
- Jinzhu She Ethnic Township (金竹畲族乡) in Le'an County

==== Ganzhou ====
- Chitu She Ethnic Township (赤土畲族乡) in Nankang City

==== Ji'an ====
- Donggu She Ethnic Township (东固畲族乡) in Qingyuan District
- Longgang She Ethnic Township (龙冈畲族乡) in Yongfeng County
- Jinping Ethnic Township (金坪民族乡) in Xiajiang County

=== Guangdong ===
==== Heyuan ====
- Zhangxi She Ethnic Township (漳溪畲族乡) in Dongyuan County

== Distribution of She people in China ==
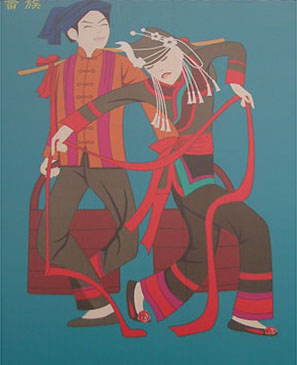
Gelao people (仡佬) (right) and She people 畲族 (left) depicted on a mural in Niu Jie (Cow Street) of Beijing.

The roughly 45,000 She living in Guizhou province form a separate subgroup, the Dongjia (东家人; Dōngjiā Rén), who differ notably in culture from the She in other areas.

=== Provincial level ===
In the Census of 2020, 746,385 She have been counted in China.

Distribution of She people in China

Administrative division	Number of She	Percentage of all She in China
Fujian	374,663	50.20%
Zhejiang	182,507	24.45%
Jiangxi	74,072	9.92%
Guangdong	42,080	5.64%
Guizhou	41,794	5.60%
Shanghai	4,476	0.60%
Hunan	3,800	0.51%
Hubei	3,748	0.50%
Other Provinces	19,245	2.58%

=== District level ===
Distribution of She people by district (as of 2000)

Only values of 0.5% and greater have been considered.

Province	Prefecture-level division	County-level division	Number of She	Relative percentage of all She in China
Fujian	Ningde	Fu'an	59,931	8.45%
Guizhou	Qiandongnan Miao and Dong Autonomous Prefecture	Majiang County	35,422	4.99%
Fujian	Ningde	Xiapu County	35,071	4.94%
Fujian	Longyan	Shanghang County	30,735	4.33%
Fujian	Ningde	Fuding	28,207	3.98%
Fujian	Ningde	Jiaocheng District	22,054	3.11%
Fujian	Ningde	Xiapu County	XXX	XXX%
Fujian	Zhangzhou	Zhangpu County	20,729	2.92%
Zhejiang	Lishui	Liandu District	19,455	2.74%
Fujian	Fuzhou	Luoyuan County	18,495	2.61%
Zhejiang	Lishui	Jingning She Autonomous County	16,144	2.28%
Zhejiang	Wenzhou	Cangnan County	16,133	2.27%
Zhejiang	Wenzhou	Taishun County	13,862	1.95%
Zhejiang	Lishui	Suichang	13,658	1.92%
Fujian	Fuzhou	Lianjiang County	11,918	1.68%
Fujian	Zhangzhou	Zhao'an	11,048	1.56%
Fujian	Zhangzhou	Longhai	9,583	1.35%
Zhejiang	Wenzhou	Wencheng County	9,287	1.31%
Zhejiang	Wenzhou	Pingyang County	9,137	1.29%
Zhejiang	Quzhou	Longyou County	8,934	1.26%
Jiangxi	Ganzhou	Nankang	8,888	1.25%
Zhejiang	Lishui	Yunhe County	8,884	1.25%
Fujian	Quanzhou	Anxi County	8,673	1.22%
Fujian	Ningde	Gutian County	7,708	1.09%
Zhejiang	Lishui	Longquan	7,486	1.05%
Zhejiang	Jinhua	Wuyi County	7,218	1.02%
Fujian	Sanming	Ninghua County	7,003	0.99%
Jiangxi	Ganzhou	Xinfeng County	6,462	0.91%
Fujian	Nanping	Shunchang County	6,246	0.88%
Jiangxi	Ganzhou	Xingguo County	5,777	0.81%
Fujian	Quanzhou	Quangang District	5,521	0.78%
Jiangxi	Ganzhou	Dayu County	5,380	0.76%
Fujian	Fuzhou	Fuqing	5,261	0.74%
Fujian	Quanzhou	Nan'an	5,218	0.74%
Fujian	Sanming	Yong'an	4,637	0.65%
Guangdong	Heyuan	Dongyuan County	4,621	0.65%
Zhejiang	Hangzhou	Tonglu County	4,536	0.64%
Zhejiang	Lishui	Songyang County	4,526	0.64%
Guangdong	Shaoguan	Nanxiong	4,430	0.62%
Fujian	Zhangzhou	Xiangcheng District	4,332	0.61%
Fujian	Nanping	Jianyang	4,327	0.61%
Fujian	Fuzhou	Yongtai County	4,231	0.6%
Guizhou	Qiannan Buyei and Miao Autonomous Prefecture	Fuquan	4,022	0.57%
Fujian	Xiamen	Huli District	4,017	0.57%
Zhejiang	Quzhou	Qujiang District	4,014	0.57%
Fujian	Fuzhou	Jin'an District	3,867	0.54%
Jiangxi	Ganzhou	Huichang County	3,632	0.51%
Jiangxi	Ganzhou	Yudu County	3,630	0.51%
Zhejiang	Hangzhou	Lin'an	3,616	0.51%
Rest of China			161,626	22.78%

== Notes and references ==
- You, Wenliang (游文良) (2002). 畲族语言 [The Language of the She people]. Fuzhou: 福建人民出版社 [Fujian People's Press].
- www.zgshezu.com/ {畲族网工作室}
