= Kiong Nai language =

Hmongic language of Guangxi, China

Kiong Nai
- Jiongnai
- Native to: China
- Region: Jinxiu County, Guangxi
- Native speakers: (1,100 cited 1999)
- Language family: Hmong–Mien: Hmongic; Sheic; Kiong Nai–She?; Kiong Nai

Language codes
- ISO 639-3: pnu
- Glottolog: jion1236
- ELP: Jiongnai Bunu

Kiong Nai (or Jiongnai, Chinese: 炯奈语; pinyin: Jiǒngnàiyǔ) is a divergent Hmongic (Miao) language spoken in Jinxiu County, Guangxi, China. The speakers' autonym is pronounced [kjɔŋ33 nai33] or [kjaŋ31 nɛ31]; kjɔŋ33 means 'mountain', while nai33 means 'people'. Mao & Li (2002) believe it to be most closely related to She.

== Dialects ==
Mao & Li (2002) divide Jiongnai into two major dialects.

- Longhua (龙华), spoken in Longhua (龙华村) of Changdong Township (长垌乡)
- Liuxiang (六巷), spoken in Liuxiang Township (六巷乡)

Jiongnai is spoken in the following villages in three townships of Jinxiu Yao Autonomous County, Guangxi.

- Liuxiang Township (六巷乡): Liuxiang (六巷), Mengtou (门头), Dadeng (大凳), Huangsang (黄桑), Xincun (新村), and Gupu (古蒲)
- Changdong Township (长垌乡): Longhua (龙华), Nanzhou (南州), and Dajing (大进)
- Luoxiang Township (罗香乡): Zhanger (丈二), Liutuan (六团), and Luodan (罗丹)

== Sources ==
- Mao, Zongwu 毛宗武; Li, Yunbing 李云兵 (2002). Jiǒngnàiyǔ yánjiū 炯奈语硏究 [A Study of Jiongnai] (in Chinese). Beijing: Zhongyang minzu daxue chubanshe.
- Meng, Chaoji 蒙朝吉 (2001). Yáozú Bùnǔyǔ fāngyán yánjiū 瑤族布努语方言研究 [A Study of the Bunu Dialects of the Yao People] (in Chinese). Beijing: Minzu chubanshe.
- Ratliff, Martha (2003). "Review of Mao Zongwu and Li Yunbing. 2001. Jiǒngnàiyǔ Yánjiū [A study of Jiongnai]. Beijing: Central Nationalities University Press. 322 pp" (PDF). Linguistics of the Tibeto-Burman Area. 26 (1): 119–121.
