= Hmong–Mien languages =

Language family of south China and Southeast Asia

Hmong–Mien
- Miao–Yao; Yangtzean
- Geographic distribution: China, mainland Southeast Asia
- Linguistic classification: One of the world's primary language families
- Proto-language: Proto-Hmong–Mien
- Subdivisions: Hmongic (Miao); Mienic (Yao)

Language codes
- ISO 639-5: hmx
- Glottolog: hmon1336
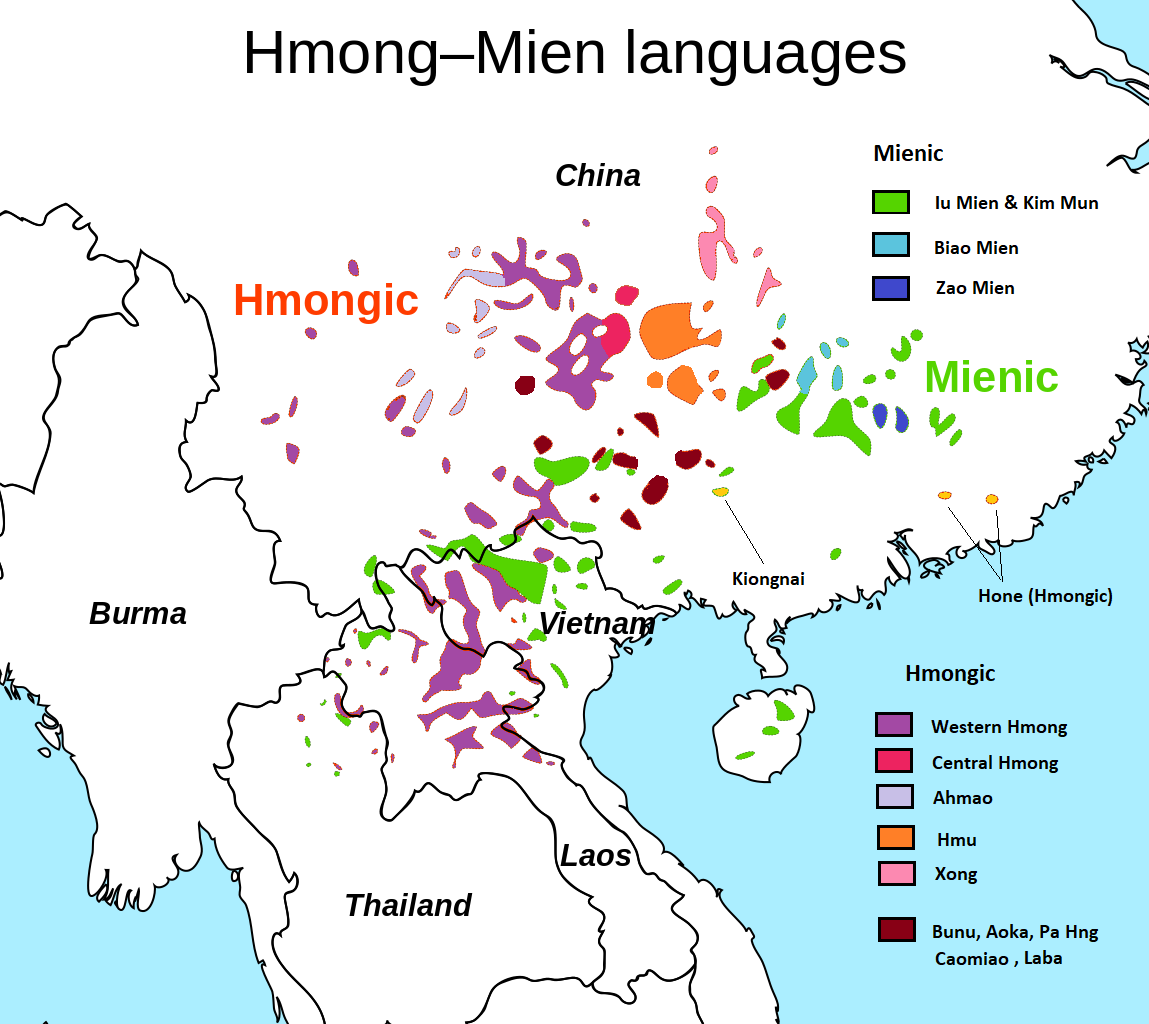
- Distribution of Hmong-Mien languages

The Hmong–Mien languages (also known as Miao–Yao and rarely as Yangtzean) are a highly tonal language family of southern China and northern Southeast Asia. They are spoken in mountainous areas of southern China, including Guizhou, Hunan, Yunnan, Sichuan, Guangxi, Guangdong and Hubei provinces. The speakers of these languages are predominantly "hill people", in contrast to the neighboring Han Chinese, who have settled the more fertile river valleys. Since their migration about four centuries ago, Hmong–Mien populations have also established communities in northern Vietnam and Laos.

== Relationships ==
Hmongic / Miao (in red) Mienic / Yao (in green)

Hmongic (Miao) and Mienic (Yao) are closely related languages, but they are clearly distinct. The largest differences are due to divergent developments in their phonological systems. The Hmongic languages appear to have kept the large set of initial consonants featured in the protolanguage but greatly reduced the distinctions in the syllable finals, in particular losing all glides and stop codas. The Mienic languages, on the other hand, have largely preserved syllable finals but reduced the number of initial consonants.

Early linguistic classifications placed the Hmong–Mien languages in the Sino-Tibetan family, where they remain in many Chinese classifications. The current consensus among Western linguists is that they constitute a family of their own, the lexical and typological similarities among Hmong–Mien and Sinitic languages being attributed to contact-induced influence.

Paul K. Benedict, an American scholar, extended the Austric theory to include the Hmong–Mien languages. The hypothesis never received much acceptance for Hmong–Mien, however. Kosaka (2002) argued specifically for a Miao–Dai family.

== Homeland ==
The most likely homeland of the Hmong–Mien languages is in Southern China between the Yangtze and Mekong rivers, but speakers of these languages might have migrated from Central China either as part of the Han Chinese expansion or as a result of exile from an original homeland by Han Chinese. Migration of people speaking these languages from South China to Southeast Asia took place during the 17th century (1600–1700). Ancient DNA evidence suggests that the ancestors of the speakers of the Hmong–Mien languages were a population genetically distinct from that of the Tai–Kadai and Austronesian language source populations at a location on the Yangtze River. Recent Y-DNA phylogeny evidence supports the proposition that people who speak the Hmong–Mien languages are descended from a population that is distantly related to those who now speak the Mon-Khmer languages.

The date of Proto-Hmong–Mien has been estimated to be about 2500 BP (500 BC) by Sagart, Blench, and Sanchez-Mazas using traditional methods employing many lines of evidence, and about 4243 BP (2250 BC) by the Automated Similarity Judgment Program (ASJP), an experimental algorithm for automatic generation of phonologically based phylogenies.

== Names ==
The Mandarin names for these languages are Miáo and Yáo.

In Vietnamese, the name for Hmong is H'Mông, and the name for Mien is Dao (i.e., Yao), although Miền is also used.

Meo, Hmu, Mong, Hmao, and Hmong are local names for Miao, but since most Laotian refugees in the United States call themselves Hmong/Mong, this name has become better known in English than the others in recent decades. However, except for some scholars who prefer the word, the term 'Hmong/Mong' is only used within certain Hmong/Miao language speaking communities in China, where the majority of the Miao speakers live. In Mandarin, despite the fact that it was once a derogatory term, the word Miao (Chinese: 苗; the tone varies according to the Sinitic dialect) is now commonly used by members of all nationalities to refer to the language and the ethnolinguistic group.

The Mandarin name Yao, on the other hand, is for the Yao nationality, which is a multicultural rather than ethnolinguistic group. It includes peoples speaking Mien, Kra–Dai, Yi, and Miao languages, the latter called Bùnǔ rather than Miáo when spoken by Yao. For this reason, the ethnonym Mien may be preferred as less ambiguous.

== Characteristics ==
Like many languages in southern China, the Hmong–Mien languages tend to be monosyllabic and syntactically analytic. They are some of the most highly tonal languages in the world: Longmo and Zongdi Hmong have as many as twelve distinct tones. They are notable phonologically for the occurrence of voiceless sonorants and uvular consonants; otherwise their phonology is quite typical of the region.

They are SVO in word order but are not as rigidly right-branching as the Tai–Kadai languages or most Mon–Khmer languages, since they have genitives and numerals before the noun like Chinese. They are extremely poor in adpositions: serial verb constructions replace most functions of adpositions in languages like English. For example, a construction translating as "be near" would be used where in English prepositions like "in" or "at" would be used.

Besides their tonality and lack of adpositions, another striking feature is the abundance of numeral classifiers and their use where other languages use definite articles or demonstratives to modify nouns.

== Mixed languages ==
Various unclassified Sinitic languages are spoken by ethnic Miao and Yao. These languages have variously been proposed as having Hmong-Mien substrata or as mixed languages, including languages such as Shanke, Laba, Lingling, Maojia, Dong, various Plains Yao spoken varieties including Jianghua Tuhua, Shaozhou Tuhua, and various Pinghua dialects.

== See also ==
- Proto-Hmong–Mien language
- Hmong-Mien comparative vocabulary list (Wiktionary)
- Hmong writing
