= Proto-Hmong–Mien language =

Reconstructed ancestor of the Hmong–Mien languages

Proto-Hmong-Mien
- Proto-Miao–Yao
- Reconstruction of: Hmong-Mien languages
- Region: Yangtze River Basin
- Era: c. 500 BCE
- Lower-order reconstructions: Proto-Hmongic; Proto-Mienic

Proto-Hmong–Mien (PHM), also known as Proto-Miao–Yao (PMY; Chinese: 原始苗瑶语), is the reconstructed ancestor of the Hmong–Mien languages. Lower-level reconstructions include Proto-Hmongic and Proto-Mienic.

== Historical chronology ==
Ratliff (2021) estimates that the split between Hmongic and Mienic had occurred before 2500 BP, since the Old Chinese words 鐵 tiě 'iron' and 下 xià 'descend' were both borrowed separately by Proto-Hmongic and Proto-Mienic.

In earlier studies, the date of proto-Hmong-Mien has been estimated to be about 2500 BP by Sagart, Blench, and Sanchez-Mazas (2004), as well as by Ratliff (2021:247). It has been estimated to about 4243 BP by the Automated Similarity Judgment Program (ASJP), however, ASJP is not widely accepted among historical linguists as a sufficiently rigorous method to establish or evaluate relationships between language families, since it only makes use of 40 basic vocabulary items.

== Reconstructions ==
Reconstructions of Proto-Hmong–Mien include the following.

- Herbert Purnell (1970) is the first comprehensive reconstruction of Proto-Hmong-Mien, Proto-Hmongic, and Proto-Mienic.
- Wang Fushi & Mao Zongwu (1995) is the first comprehensive reconstruction of Proto-Hmong-Mien by Chinese scholars.
- Chen Qiguang (2001) reconstructs Proto-Hmong-Mien based on 15 datapoints: Hmu (Yanghao 养蒿), Qo Xiong (Layiping 腊乙坪), Hmong (Dananshan 大南山), Xijia (Shibanzhai 石板寨), Pa Hng (Gundong 滚董), Younuo (Huangluo 黄落), Dongnu (Qibailong 七百弄), Nunu (Xishan 西山), She (Xiashuicun 下水村), Jiongnai (Longhua 龙华), Pana (Xinle 新乐), Iu Mien (Dapingjiang 大坪江), Kim Mun (Yanyuan 烟园 in Qiongzhong County 琼中县, Hainan), Biao Min (Shuanglong 双龙), Zao Min (Daping 大坪). A revised reconstruction was later published as Chen (2013).
- Wu Anqi (2002) reconstructs approximately 100 Swadesh list items for Proto-Hmong-Mien.
- Martha Ratliff (2010) is the first comprehensive reconstruction of Proto-Hmong-Mien by a Western scholar since Purnell (1970).
- Weera Ostapirat (2016) proposes sesquisyllables and velarization in Proto-Hmong-Mien initials, parallel to sesquisyllables and pharyngealization in Old Chinese.
- Li Yunbing (2018) reconstructs Proto-Hmong-Mien initials and finals, which are listed separately.

In China, the first comprehensive reconstruction of Proto-Hmongic (Proto-Miao) was undertaken by Wang Fushi (1979). Wang's 1979 manuscript was subsequently revised and published as Wang (1994).

Proto-Mienic (Proto-Mjuenic; reconstruction excludes Biao Min and Zao Min) has been reconstructed by Luang-Thongkum (1993). A comprehensive reconstruction of Proto-Mienic has been published by Liu (2021).

=== Ratliff (2010) ===
Martha Ratliff (2010) used 11 criterion languages for her reconstruction.

1. East Hmongic (Qiandong); Northern vernacular: Yanghao 养蒿, Yanghao Township, Taijiang County, Guizhou
2. North Hmongic (Xiangxi); Western vernacular: Jiwei 吉卫, Jiwei Township, Huayuan County, Hunan
3. West Hmongic (Chuanqiandian): White Hmong of Laos and Thailand
4. West Hmongic (Chuanqiandian); Mashan subdialect, Central vernacular: Zongdi 宗地, Zongdi Township, Ziyun County, Guizhou
5. West Hmongic (Chuanqiandian); Luobohe subdialect: Fuyuan 复员, Fuyuan County, Yunnan
6. Hmongic; Jiongnai: Changdong Township 长垌, Jinxiu County, Guangxi
7. Hmongic; Baiyun Pa-Hng: Baiyun 白云, Rongshui County, Guangxi
8. Mienic; Mien, Luoxiang vernacular: Luoxiang Township 罗香, Jinxiu County, Guangxi
9. Mienic; Mun: Lanjin Township 览金, Lingyun County, Guangxi
10. Mienic; Biao Min: Dongshan Yao Township 东山, Quanzhou County, Guangxi
11. Mienic; Zao Min: Daping Township 大平, Liannan County, Guangdong

=== Wang & Mao (1995) ===
Wang & Mao (1995) base their Proto-Hmong–Mien reconstruction on the following 23 criterion Hmong-Mien languages.

1. Yanghao 养蒿; Hmu, North (ISO 639-3: [hea])
2. Jiwei 吉卫; Qo Xiong, West [mmr]
3. Xianjin 先进 ( = Dananshan 大南山); Chuanqiandian Miao, 1st lect [cqd]
4. Shimenkan 石门坎; Diandongbei Miao [hmd]
5. Qingyan 青岩; (Note: Baituo, Qingyan Township, Huaxi District, Guiyang 贵阳市花溪区青岩乡摆托寨) Guiyang Miao, North [huj]
6. Gaopo 高坡; Huishui Miao, North [hmi]
7. Zongdi 宗地; Mashan Miao, Central [hmm]
8. Fuyuan 复员; (Note: Yejipo, Ganba Township, Fuquan County 福泉县甘坝乡野鸡坡寨) Luobohe Miao, 2nd lect [hml]
9. Fengxiang 枫香; Chong'anjiang Miao [hmj]
10. Qibainong 七百弄; Bunu, Dongnu [bwx]
11. Yaoli 瑶里; (Note: Mangjiang, Yaoli Township, Nandan County 南丹县瑶里乡芒降村) Nao Klao, Baonuo [bwx]
12. Wenjie 文界; Pa-Hng, Sanjiang [pha]
13. Changdong 长峒; Jiongnai [pnu]
14. Duozhu 多祝; (Note: Chenhu, Duozhu Township, Huidong County 惠东县多祝乡陈湖村) She [shx]
15. Jiangdi 江底; Iu Mien, Guangdian [ium]
16. Xiangjiang 湘江; Iu Mien, Xiangnan [ium]
17. Luoxiang 罗香; Luoxiang Mien a.k.a. Ao Biao [ium]
18. Changping 长坪; Changping Mien a.k.a. Biao Mon [ium]
19. Liangzi 梁子; Kim Mun [mji]
20. Lanjin 览金; Kim Mun [mji]
21. Dongshan 东山; Biao Mon, Dongshan [bmt]
22. Sanjiang 三江; Biao Mon, Shikou a.k.a. Chao Kong Meng [bmt]
23. Daping 大坪; Dzao Min [bpn]

== Phonology ==
=== Ratliff (2010) ===
Martha Ratliff's 2010 reconstruction contains the following phonemic inventory.

- 51–54 consonants (including pre-glottalized and pre-nasalized consonants)
- 9 monophthong vowels
- 7 diphthongs
- 11 nasal rimes

The full set of Proto-Hmong–Mien initial consonants is (Ratliff 2010: 31):

		Bilabial	Alveolar	Postalveolar	Palatal	Velar	Uvular	Glottal
Plain stop	aspirated	pʰ	tʰ	tsʰ	cʰ	kʰ		
Plain stop	voiceless	p	t	ts	c	k	q/(qʷ)	ʔ
Plain stop	voiced	b	d	dz	ɟ	ɡ	ɢ	
Pre-nasalized stop	aspirated	ᵐpʰ	ⁿtʰ	ⁿtsʰ	ᶮcʰ	ᵑkʰ		
Pre-nasalized stop	voiceless	ᵐp	ⁿt	ⁿts	ᶮc	ᵑk	ᶰq	
Pre-nasalized stop	voiced	ᵐb	ⁿd	ⁿdz	ᶮɟ	ᵑɡ	ᶰɢ	
Nasal	voiced	m	n		ɲ/(ɲʷ)	(ŋ)/(ŋʷ)		
Nasal	pre-glottalized	ˀm	ˀn		ˀɲ			
Nasal	aspirated	ʰm	ʰn		ʰɲ			
Glide	voiced	w			j			
Glide	pre-glottalized	ˀw			ˀj			
Glide	aspirated	(ʰw)			ʰj			
Fricative	voiceless		s		ɕ			h
Fricative	voiced					(ɣ)		(ɦ)

The 3 medial consonants are *-j-, *-l-, and *-r-. The 6 final stop consonants are *-p, *-t, *-k, *-m, *-n, and *-ŋ.

The Proto-Hmong–Mien vowels are (11 total) (Ratliff 2010: 108):

	Front	Central	Back
High	i	ɨ, ʉ	u
Mid-high	e		o
Central		ə	
Mid-low	ɛ		ɔ
Near-low	æ		
Low	a		

Proto-Hmong–Mien has the following syllable structure (Ratliff 2010:10):

(C) C [j/w/l] [i̯/u̯] (V) V C (C)^{T}

Ratliff (2010) does not reconstruct vowel length for either Proto-Mienic or Proto-Hmong–Mien; in contrast, Li (2018) reconstructs vowel length for both. Even though Mienic languages usually have vowel length, Ratliff ascribes this to areal features that were borrowed after the breakup of Proto-Mienic. Neighboring languages with vowel length include Yue Chinese and Zhuang.

=== Ostapirat (2016) ===
Ostapirat (2016) revises various reconstructed Proto-Hmong–Mien consonant initials proposed by Ratliff (2010). He suggests that many proto-initials are in fact sesquisyllables, in line with Baxter & Sagart's (2014) Old Chinese reconstruction and Pittayaporn's (2009) Proto-Tai reconstruction. Examples include reconstructing *m.l- and *m.r- where Ratliff (2010) reconstructs *mbl- and *mbr-, respectively. Hmong-Mien presyllables are further discussed in Strecker (2021).

Ostapirat (2016) also reconstructs velarized initial consonants (*Cˠ-) where Ratliff (2010) reconstructs -j- or -w-. Similarly, Norquest (2020) also reconstructs velarized initial consonants for Proto-Kra–Dai.

Additionally, Ostapirat revises Ratliff's uvulars (*q-, etc.) as velars (*k-, etc.), and her palatals as either alveolars or palatals.

Below are some reconstructions from Ostapirat (2016) compared with those of Ratliff (2010).

Gloss	Proto-Hmong-Mien (Ostapirat 2016)	Proto-Hmong-Mien (Ratliff 2010)	Proto-Mienic (Ratliff 2010)	Notes
fruit	*pˠeu^{B}	*pji̯əuX		
float	*mbˠeu^{A}		*mbi̯əu^{A}	< OC 浮
bedbug	*pˠi^{A}	*pji		
three	*pˠu^{A}	*pjɔu		
burn	*pˠu^{B}		*pɔu^{B}	
name	*mpˠu^{C}	*mpɔuH		
hand	*bˠu^{B}	*-bɔuX		
to know	*pei^{A}	*pei		
to dream	*mpei^{C}	*mpeiH		
to sleep	*pˠei^{C}	*pu̯eiH		
to boil	*mpˠei^{C}	*mpuæiH		
to rake	*ba^{A}		*ba^{A}	< OC 耙
thin	*bˠe^{D}		*bi̯ɛk^{D}	< OC 薄
father	*pˠe^{B}	*pjaX		< OC 父
to mend	*mpˠe^{B}	*mpjaX		< OC 補
chaff	*mphˠe^{D}	*mpʰi̯ɛk		
dog	*klu^{B}	*qluwX		< OC 狗
cucumber	*klˠa^{A}	*Kʷa		< OC 瓜
to cross over	*klˠai^{C}	*KʷajH		< OC 過
wide	*klˠaŋ^{B}	*Kʷi̯aŋX		< OC 廣
far	*klˠu^{A}	*qʷuw		< OC 迂 (Note: Ratliff (2021:253))
bear	*klˠep^{D}	*qrep		

=== Taguchi (2023) ===
Taguchi (2023) discusses several revisions in the phonological reconstruction of Proto-Hmong–Mien and suggests a classification based on lexical evidence rather than phonological sound changes. Rimes are simplified, while nasal codas in open rimes in Proto-Hmongic are posited to have derived from historical nasal initial consonants. Taguchi (2023) also suggests that Ratliff's (2010) Proto-Hmongic *k- and *q- are in fact secondary developments from Proto-Hmong–Mien *kr- and *k-, respectively.

== Vocabulary ==
Below are some words roughly belonging to the semantic domains of agriculture and subsistence from Ratliff (2004), with the Proto-Hmong-Mien and Proto-Hmongic reconstructions from Ratliff (2010), and Old Chinese reconstructions from Baxter & Sagart (2014) for comparison (note that the Old Chinese forms are not necessarily cognate with the Hmong–Mien forms). Terms for domesticated animals and non-rice crops are usually shared with Chinese, while vocabulary relating to hunting, rice crops, and local plants and animals are usually not shared with Chinese.

Proto- Hmong–Mien	Proto-Hmongic	Old Chinese	English
	*ntsʰʉ^{C}	*s-daŋʔ (象)	elephant
	*ʔlin^{A}	*ɢʷan (Note: Zhengzhang reconstruction) (猿)	monkey
	*ŋgu̯ei^{B}	*krun (麇)	river deer
	*tsjɔ^{B}	*qʰˁraʔ (虎)	tiger
	*ɢləŋ^{B}	*tsʰˁoŋ (蔥)	Chinese onion
*NKan		*C.mˁru (茅)	cogon grass
	*ʰnæn^{B}	*C.nˁaʔ (弩)	crossbow
*pənX		*Cə.lak-s (射)	to shoot
	*ndro^{C}	*lriwk (逐)	to track, follow
*Kəi		*kˁe (雞)	chicken
*m-nɔk		*tˁiw (雕)	bird
*qluwX	*hmaŋ^{C}	*Cə.kˁroʔ (狗)	dog
*ʔap		*qraːb (Note: Zhengzhang reconstruction) (鴨)	duck
	*mpæ^{C}	*pˁra (豝)	pig
*juŋ		*ɢaŋ (羊)	sheep/goat
*ŋiuŋ		*s.ɢijʔ (兕)	water buffalo
*dup		*N.tˁo-s (豆)	bean
*N-peiX		*s-t(ʰ)uk (菽)	soybean
*wouH		*ɢʷa-s (芋)	taro
*mbləu		*lˁuʔ (稻)	rice plant; growing/unhusked rice
	*ntsuw^{C}	*(C.)mˤejʔ (米)	husked rice
*hnrəaŋH		*bonʔ-s (飯)	cooked rice

The ethnonym Hmong is reconstructed as *hmʉŋ^{A} in Proto-Hmongic by Ratliff (2010), while Mien is reconstructed as *mjæn^{A} in Proto-Mienic. In comparison, William H. Baxter and Laurent Sagart (2014) reconstruct the Old Chinese name of the Mán 蠻 (Nanman 南蠻, or southern foreigners) as 蠻 *mˤro[n]; additionally, Sidwell & Rau (2015) reconstruct the Proto-Austroasiatic word for 'person' as *mraʔ.

== External relationships ==
Proto-Hmong–Mien shares many lexical similarities with neighboring language families, including Austroasiatic, Kra-Dai (Tai-Kadai), Austronesian, and Tibeto-Burman (Ratliff 2010). Martha Ratliff (2010:233-237) lists the following lexical resemblances between Proto-Hmong–Mien (abbreviated below as PHM) and other language families. Proto-Hmongic and Proto-Mienic are provided if the Proto-Hmong–Mien form is not reconstructed.

=== Austroasiatic ===
Many lexical resemblances are found between the Hmong-Mien and Austroasiatic language families (Ratliff 2010), some of which had earlier been proposed by Haudricourt (1951). Proto-Austroasiatic (PAA) reconstructions are from Sidwell (2024).

Lexical resemblances with Austroasiatic

- PHM *ʔu̯əm 'water'; Proto-Palaungic *ʔoːm
- PHM *ntshjamX 'blood'; PAA *ɕaːm, *mɕaːm
- PHM *ntju̯əŋH 'tree'; PAA *Clɔːŋ
- PHM *ʔɲæmX 'to weep, cry'; PAA *jaːmˀ
- PHM *pənX 'to shoot'; PAA *paɲˀ
- PHM *tu̯eiX 'tail'; PAA *sntaʔ
- PHM *mpeiH 'to dream'; PAA *ʔmpoːˀ
- PHM *ʔpu̯ɛŋX 'full'; PAA *bi(ː)ŋ
- Proto-Hmongic *mbrɔ^{D} 'ant'; PAA *s<m>uːcˀ
- Proto-Mienic *səp^{D} 'centipede'; PAA *kʔiːpˀ
- PHM *klup 'grasshopper'
- PHM *ntshjeiX 'head louse'; PAA *ciʔ

Other Austroasiatic parallels listed by Kosaka (2002:94) are:

- PHM *tshuŋX 'bone'; PAA *cʔaːŋ
- PHM *S-phreiX 'head'; PAA *ɓoːkˀ
- PHM *pji̯əuX 'fruit'; PAA *pleʔ
- PHM *pjɔu 'three'; PAA *peːˀ

Ostapirat (2018:116-117) lists compares the following basic vocabulary items in Hmong-Mien and Austroasiatic. Proto-Palaungic as reconstructed by Sidwell (2015) has also been reconstructed.

Gloss	Proto-Hmong–Mien (Ratliff 2010)	Proto-Vietic (Ferlus 1991)	Proto-Wa (Diffloth 1980)	Proto-Palaungic (Sidwell 2015)
louse	*ntshjeiX	*ciʔ	*siʔ	*ciːʔ
fruit	*pji̯əuX	*pleʔ	*pliʔ	*pliːʔ
road	*kləuX	*khraʔ	*kraʔ	*kraːʔ
shoot	*pənX	*paɲʔ	*pɤɲ	*ɓaŋ
blood	*ntshjamX	*asaːmʔ	*hnam	*snaːm
weep	*ʔɲæmX	*jaːmʔ, *ɲaːmʔ	*jam	*jaːm
hawk	*qlaŋX	*klaːŋʔ	*klaŋ	*klaːŋ
cooked	*sjenX (Proto-Hmongic)	*ciːnʔ	*sin	*ciːn
heavy	*hnjeinX	*naŋʔ	(*s-jen)	*kəɟan
full	*pu̯ɛŋX	pɔiŋ (Mon)	phoiɲ (Khasi)	-
nose	*mbruiH	*muːs	*mɨs	*muːs
name	*mpɔuH	jhmoh (Middle Khmer)	*mɨs	*muːs
horn	*klɛɔŋ	*kərəŋ	*ʔrɤŋ	*-rɤŋ
water	*ʔu̯əm	ʔom (Palaung)	*rʔom	*ʔoːm
live, alive	*ʔjəm	ʔim (Palaung)	*ʔem	*ʔiːm
I	*ʔja (Proto-Mienic)	ʔoa (Mon)	*ʔɨʔ	*ʔɔːʔ
thou	*mu̯ei	mày (Vietnamese)	me (Khasi)	*miːʔ
one	*ʔɨ	-	ʔu (Palaung)	(*moːh)
two	*ʔu̯i	-	ʔa (Palaung)	(*ləʔaːr)
three	*pjɔu	paj (Kui)	-	(*ləʔɔːj)

Further lexical resemblances between Hmong-Mien and Austroasiatic are listed in Hsiu (2017).

=== Kra-Dai ===
Many lexical resemblances are found between the Hmong-Mien and Kra-Dai language families, although the tones often do not correspond (Ratliff 2010). Proto-Tai (abbreviated here as PT) reconstructions are from Pittayaporn (2009). Many of the Proto-Tai forms also have close parallels with Proto-Austronesian.

Lexical resemblances with Kra-Dai

- Proto-Hmongic *kɛŋ^{B} 'I, 1.SG'; PT *kuː^{A} (strong form), *kaw^{A} (weak form)
- PHM *mu̯ei 'thou, 2.SG'; PT *mɯŋ^{A} (strong form), *maɰ^{A} (weak form)
- PHM *təjH 'to die', *dəjH 'to kill'; PT *p.taːj^{A} 'to die'
- PHM *ʔneinX 'this'; PT *naj^{C}
- PHM *m-nɔk 'bird'; PT *C̬.nok^{D}
- PHM *mbrəuX 'fish'; PT *plaː^{A}
- Proto-Hmongic *hmaŋ^{C} 'wild dog'; PT *ʰmaː^{A} 'dog'
- Proto-Hmongic *ʔlin^{A} 'monkey'; PT *liːŋ^{A}

Kosaka (2002) lists many lexical resemblances between Kra-Dai and Hmong-Mien languages, and proposes that they form part of a larger Miao-Dai language family.

=== Austronesian ===
Many lexical resemblances are found between the Hmong-Mien and Austronesian language families, some of which are also shared with Kra-Dai and Austroasiatic (Ratliff 2010). Proto-Austronesian (abbreviated here as PAN) and Proto-Malayo-Polynesian (abbreviated here as PMP) reconstructions are from Blust (n.d.).

Lexical resemblances with Austronesian and Kra-Dai

- Proto-Hmongic *kɛŋ^{B} 'I, 1.SG'; PMP *-ku 'my'
- PHM *mu̯ei 'thou, 2.SG'; PAN *-mu '2nd person'
- PHM *mi̯əu 'you (plural), 2.PL'; PAN *-mu '2nd person'
- PHM *təjH 'to die'; PAN *ma-aCay
- PHM *dəjH 'to kill'; PAN *pa-aCay
- PHM *m-nɔk 'bird'; PMP *manuk

Lexical resemblances with Austronesian and Austroasiatic

- PHM *tu̯eiX 'tail'; PMP *buntut
- PHM *pu̯ɛŋX 'full'; PMP *penuq
- PHM *pənX 'to shoot'; PMP *panaq
- PHM *mpeiH 'to dream'; PAN *Sepi, PMP *hi(m)pi

Other lexical resemblances with Austronesian

- PHM *mlu̯ɛjH 'soft'; PMP *ma-lumu
- PHM *dəp 'bite'; PMP *ketep
- PHM *klæŋ 'insect, worm, maggot'; PAN *qulej 'maggot'
- PHM *tɛmX 'body louse'; PAN *CumeS, PMP *tumah 'clothes louse'

=== Tibeto-Burman ===
Ratliff notes that the Hmong-Mien numerals from 4-9 and various culture-related vocabulary have been borrowed from Tibeto-Burman. The Proto-Tibeto-Burman (abbreviated as PTB) forms provided below are from James Matisoff (2003).

Lexical borrowings from Tibeto-Burman

- PHM *plei 'four' < PTB *b-ləy (STEDT #2409)
- PHM *prja 'five' < PTB *b-ŋa (STEDT #1306)
- PHM *kruk 'six' < PTB *d-k-ruk (STEDT #2621)
- PHM *dzjuŋH 'seven' (cf. Tibetan བདུན (bdun))
- Proto-Mienic *ŋji^{C} 'seven' < PTB *s-ni-s (STEDT #2505)
- PHM *jat 'eight' < PTB *b-r-gyat ~ *b-g-ryat (STEDT #2259)
- PHM *N-ɟuə 'nine' < PTB *d/s-kəw (STEDT #2364)
- Proto-Hmongic *hnɛŋ^{A} and Proto-Mienic *hnu̯ɔi^{A} 'sun, day' < PTB *s-nəy (STEDT #85)
- PHM *hlaH 'moon, month' < PTB *s-la (STEDT #1016)
- PHM *hməŋH 'night' (also 'dark') < PTB *s-muːŋ 'dark' (STEDT #522; #2465)
- PHM *ʔɲam 'sister-in-law' (also 'daughter-in-law') < PTB *nam 'daughter-in-law' (STEDT #2486)
- PHM *ʔweiX 'son-in-law' < PTB *krwəy (STEDT #2348)
- PHM *help 'to slice' < PTB *s-lep (STEDT #2401)
- PHM *hmjænX 'footprint, track' < PTB *s-naŋ 'to follow' (STEDT #2488)
- Proto-Hmongic *mjæn^{B} 'horse' < PTB *mraŋ (STEDT #1431)

Additionally, Paul K. Benedict (1987) notes that Proto-Hmong–Mien contains loanwords from an unknown Tibeto-Burman language or branch, which Benedict refers to as Donor Miao-Yao. Benedict (1987:20) believes that these Tibeto-Burman loanwords predate Hmong-Mien's contact with Old Chinese. Some numerals that Benedict (1987) reconstructed for Proto-Donor Miao-Yao are given below.

- *pli^{A} 'four'
- *pra^{A} 'five'
- *truk 'six'
- *znis 'seven'
- *hryat 'eight'
- *t-gu^{A} 'nine'
- *gup 'ten'

Guillaume Jacques (2021) notes that there are Tibeto-Burman parallels for various Hmong-Mien words that are found specifically in rGyalrongic and neighboring Qiangic languages. These include the words for 'snow' (cf. Jiangdi Mien bwan^{5}), 'scold' (Proto-Hmongic *qe^{C}), 'walnut' (Proto-Hmongic *qlow^{C}), and 'bamboo' (Proto-Hmong-Mien *hləwX).

== See also ==
- Proto-Hmong-Mien reconstructions (Wiktionary)
- Proto-Hmongic reconstructions (Wiktionary)
- Proto-Mienic reconstructions (Wiktionary)
- Hmong-Mien comparative vocabulary list (Wiktionary)
