= Biao Mon language =

Mienic language of Guangxi, China

Biao Mon
- Changping Mien
- Native to: China
- Region: Guangxi
- Native speakers: (20,000 cited 1995)
- Language family: Hmong–Mien: Mienic; Biao Mon

Language codes
- ISO 639-3: bmt
- Glottolog: biao1256

Biao Mon (autonym: bjau31 moːn31) is a Mienic language of Guangxi province, China. It is spoken in Lipu, Mengshan, Pingle, and Zhaoping counties in Guangxi, China.

Biao Mon is not to be confused with Biao Min, a different Mienic language spoken to the north in Quanzhou and Gongcheng counties of Guangxi. Also, despite sometimes being referred to as "Mien", Biao Mon is not a variety of Iu Mien and is distinct from it.

== Names ==
Alternative names for Biao Mon include (Ethnologue):

- Biao Mien
- Biao-Mian 标勉
- Biaoman 标曼
- Changping 长坪

Biao Mon is referred to by Luang-Thongkum (1993) as Muen.

== Varieties ==
Mao (2004) provides extensive documentation of the Biao Mon variety of Dongpingdong village 东坪垌村, Changping township 长坪乡, Mengshan County 蒙山县, Guangxi.

"Biao Man 标曼" (bjau22 mwan22) of Liuchong 六冲, Qiaoting Township 桥亭乡, Pingle County 平乐县, Guangxi is documented by Tang (1994); another "Biao Man 标曼" dialect is spoken in Dongpingdong 东坪洞 (Tang 1994).

Luoxiang 罗香 (Ao Biao 坳标), a Mienic language variety of Jinxiu County, Guangxi, is closely related to Biao Mon but is distinct from it.

== Sources ==
- Mao Zongwu [毛宗武]. 2004. A study of Mien dialects [Yao zu Mian yu fang yan yan jiu 瑤族勉语方言研究]. Beijing: Publishing House of Minority Nationalities.
