= Iu Mien language =

Language spoken by the Iu Mien people in China

Iu Mien
- Iu Mienh
- Pronunciation: [ju˧ mjɛn˧˩]
- Native to: China, Vietnam, Laos, Thailand, Communities in United States, and France.
- Native speakers: (800,000 cited 1995–2019)
- Language family: Hmong–Mien: Mienic; Mian–Jin; Iu Mien

Official status
- Official language in: (Jinxiu Yao Autonomous County)

Language codes
- ISO 639-3: ium
- Glottolog: iumi1238

The Iu Mien language (Iu Mien: Iu Mienh, [ju˧ mjɛn˧˩]; Chinese: 勉語 or 勉方言; Thai: ภาษาเมี่ยน or ภาษาอิ้วเมี่ยน) is the language spoken by the Iu Mien people in China (where they are considered a constituent group of the Yao peoples), Laos, Vietnam, Thailand and, more recently, the United States in diaspora. Like other Mien languages, it is tonal and monosyllabic.

Linguists in China consider the dialect spoken in Changdong, Jinxiu Yao Autonomous County, Guangxi to be the standard. This standard is also spoken by Iu Mien in the West, however, because most are refugees from Laos, their dialect incorporates influences from the Lao and Thai languages.

Iu Mien has 78% lexical similarity with Kim Mun (Lanten), 70% with Biao-Jiao Mien, and 61% with Dzao Min.

== Geographic distribution ==
In China, it is spoken in the following counties (Mao 2004:302–303). There are 130,000 speakers in Hunan province, and 400,000 speakers in Guangxi, Yunnan, Guangdong, Guizhou and Jiangxi provinces.

- Guangxi: Yangshuo, Lingui, Guanyang, Ziyuan, Xing'an, Longsheng, Gongcheng, Yongfu, Luzhai, Lipu, Mengshan, Pingle, Jinxiu, Yishan, Rong'an, Rongshui, Luocheng, Huanjiang, Shanglin, Xincheng, Laibin, Baise, Napo, Lingyun, Tianlin, Cangwu, Hezhou, Fuchuan, Zhaoping, Fangcheng, Shangsi
- Guangdong: Yingde, Lechang, Shixing, Qujiang, Renhua, Wengyuan, Ruyuan, Liannan, Lianshan, Yangshan, Yangchun
- Yunnan: Hekou, Jinping, Honghe, Mengla, Malipo, Maguan, Gangnan, Funing, Wenshan
- Guizhou: Rongjiang, Congjiang, Sandu, Danzhai, Leishan, Zhenfeng, Luodian
- Jiangxi: Quannan, Shanggao
- Hunan: Jianghua, Yongzhou, Shuangpai, Xintian, Changning, Daoxian, Lanshan, Lingxian, Ningyuan, Jiangyong, Dong'an, Chenzhou, Zixing, Lingwu, Guiyang, Xinning, Yizhang, Chengbu, Qiyang, Chenxi; also in Longzha Township (龙渣瑶族乡), Yanling County

In Vietnam, Dao people belonging to the Đại Bản, Tiểu Bản, Quần Chẹt, Ô Gang, Cóc Ngáng, and Cóc Mùn subgroups speak Iu Mien dialects.

== Phonology ==
=== Consonants ===
There are 31 cited consonant phonemes in Iu Mien. A distinguishing feature of Iu Mien consonants is the presence of voiceless nasals and laterals.

Consonant phonemes of Iu Mien (unknown dialect)
		Labial	Alveolar		Palatal	Velar	Glottal
		Labial	plain	sibilant	Palatal	Velar	Glottal
Nasal	voiced	m	n		ɲ	ŋ	
Nasal	voiceless	m̥	n̥		ɲ̊	ŋ̊	
Plosive/ Affricate	plain	p	t	t͡s	t͡ɕ	k	ʔ
Plosive/ Affricate	aspirated	pʰ	tʰ	t͡sʰ	t͡ɕʰ	kʰ	ʔ
Plosive/ Affricate	voiced	b	d	d͡z	d͡ʑ	ɡ	ʔ
Fricative		f		s			h
Glide					j	w	
Lateral	voiced		l				
Lateral	voiceless		l̥				

1. The standard spelling system for Iu Mien does not represent the stop sounds in a way that corresponds to the IPA symbols, but instead uses e.g. ⟨t⟩, ⟨d⟩, and ⟨nd⟩ to represent /tʰ/, /t/, and /d/. This may stem from an attempt to model the Iu Mien spelling system on Pinyin (used to represent Mandarin Chinese), where ⟨t⟩ and ⟨d⟩ represent /tʰ/ and /t/. The Pinyin influence is also seen in the use of ⟨c⟩, ⟨z⟩, and ⟨nz⟩ to represent the alveolar affricates /t͡sʰ/, /t͡s/, and /d͡z/ and ⟨q⟩, ⟨j⟩, and ⟨nj⟩ for the postalveolar affricates /t͡ɕʰ/, /t͡ɕ/, and /d͡ʑ/. The use of ⟨ng⟩ to represent the velar nasal /ŋ/ means that it cannot also be used to represent /ɡ/, as would be predicted; instead, ⟨nq⟩ is used.
2. According to Aumann and Pan, in a certain Chinese dialect, the postalveolar affricates are instead palatal stops (/cʰ/, /c/, /ɟ/).
3. According to Daniel Bruhn, the voiceless nasals are actually sequences [h̃m], [h̃n], [h̃ŋ], and [h̃ɲ] (i.e. a short nasalized /h/ followed by a voiced nasal), while the voiceless lateral is actually a voiceless lateral fricative [ɬ].
4. Bruhn also observed that younger-generation Iu Mien Americans were more likely to substitute the voiceless nasals and voiceless laterals with /h/ and the alveolo-palatal affricates with their corresponding palato-alveolar variants.

==== Onset ====
It appears that all single consonant phonemes except /ʔ/ can occur as the onset.

==== Coda ====
Unlike Hmong, which generally prohibits coda consonants, Iu Mien has seven single consonant phonemes that can take the coda position. These consonants are /m/, /n/, /ŋ/, [p̚], [t̚], [k̚], and /ʔ/. Some of the stops can only occur as final consonants when accompanied by certain tones; for example, /ʔ/ only occurs with the tone ⟨c⟩ or ⟨v⟩.

=== Vowels ===
Monophthongs of Iu Mien (unknown dialect)
	Front	Central	Back
High	i		u
High-mid	e		o
Low-mid	ɛ	ɜ	
Near-low	æ	ɐ	
Low	aː		ɒ

Iu Mien vowels are represented in the Iu Mien United Script using combinations of the six letters, ⟨a⟩, ⟨e⟩, ⟨i⟩, ⟨o⟩, ⟨u⟩, and ⟨r⟩.

According to Bruhn, the monophthongs are ⟨i⟩, ⟨u⟩, ⟨e⟩, ⟨o⟩, ⟨ai⟩, ⟨er⟩, ⟨ae⟩, ⟨a⟩, ⟨aa⟩, and ⟨or⟩. The diphthongs are ⟨ai⟩, ⟨aai⟩, ⟨au⟩, ⟨aau⟩, ⟨ei⟩, ⟨oi⟩, ⟨ou⟩, ⟨eu⟩. Furthermore, additional diphthongs and triphthongs can be formed from the aforementioned vowels through /i/- or /u/-on-gliding (having /i/ or /u/ before the vowel). Such vowels attested by Bruhn include ⟨ia⟩, ⟨iaa⟩, ⟨ie⟩, ⟨io⟩, ⟨iu⟩, ⟨ior⟩, ⟨iai⟩, ⟨iaai⟩, ⟨iau⟩, ⟨iaau⟩, ⟨iei⟩, ⟨iou⟩, ⟨ua⟩, ⟨uaa⟩, ⟨uae⟩, ⟨ue⟩, ⟨ui⟩, ⟨uo⟩, ⟨uai⟩, ⟨uaai⟩, and ⟨uei⟩.

The dialect studied by Bruhn, and described in the above table, has a phoneme /ɛ/ that does not have its own spelling, but is represented in various contexts either as ⟨e⟩ or ⟨ai⟩ (which are also used for /e/ and /aɪ/, respectively). In all cases where /ɛ/ is spelled ⟨e⟩, and nearly all cases where it is spelled ⟨ai⟩, it does not contrast with /e/ or /aɪ/, respectively, and can be viewed as an allophone of these sounds. The only potential exception appears to be when occurring as a syllable final by itself, where it has an extremely restricted distribution, occurring only after the (alveolo-)palatal consonants /tɕ/, /dʑ/, and /ɲ/. The sound /ɛ/ may be a secondary development from /aɪ/ in this context, although Bruhn does not discuss this issue.

=== Tones ===
Iu Mien is a tonal language with six observed tonemes.

In the Iu Mien United Script (the language's most common writing system), tones are not marked with diacritics; rather, a word's tone is indicated by a special marker letter at the end of the word. If a word lacks a marker, then it is to be pronounced with a middle tone.

IPA	Description	IMUS	Example	English meaning
˦/˦˥	High	v	maaiv	lopsided
˧˩	Mid, falling	h	maaih	to have
˧	Mid	∅	maai	basic tail of bird
˨/˨˩	Low	c	maaic	to sell
˨˧	Low, rising	x	maaix	nightmare
˨˧/˨˧˨	Lower, longer, rise-fall	z	maaiz	to buy

== Grammar ==
Iu Mien is an analytic language and lacks inflection. It is also a monosyllabic language, with most of its lexicon consisting of one syllable.

The language follows a SVO word order. Some other syntactic properties include the following:

- Adjectives usually follow nouns.
- Question words like those meaning 'where' generally come at the end of sentences.
- The negative word maiv (often shortened to mv) may occur before verbs to negate them.
- A prevalence of contractions. Some words consist of a contracted syllable followed by an uncontracted second syllable (in IMUS, these syllables are separated by apostrophes). One such example is ga'nyorc ("spider"), a contraction of gaeng-nyorc ("insect-spider").

== Writing system ==
In the past, the lack of an alphabet caused low rates of literacy amongst the Iu Mien speakers. It had been written with Chinese characters in China; however, this is extremely difficult for Iu Mien speakers from other countries such as Laos and from groups who now live in the West.

In an effort to address this, an Iu Mien Unified Script was created in 1984 using the Latin script, based on an earlier orthography developed in China. Unlike the Vietnamese language, this alphabet does not use any diacritics to distinguish tones or different vowel sounds, and only uses the 26 letters of the ISO basic Latin alphabet. This orthography distinguishes 30 initials, 128 finals, and eight tones. Hyphens are used to link adjectives with the nouns they modify. The alphabet is similar to the RPA used to write the Hmong language and the Hanyu Pinyin transcription scheme used for Chinese.

=== IMUS spelling-to-sound correspondences ===
Consonants
Spelling	IPA	Example
hm	/m̥/	hmien ('face')
m	/m/	maiv ('not'), hnamv
hn	/n̥/	hnoi ('day')
n	/n/	nie ('soil'), bun ('give')
hny	/ɲ̥/	hnyangx ('year')
ny	/ɲ/	nyei ('mine')
hng	/ŋ̊/	hngongx ('dumb')
ng	/ŋ/	ngongh ('cow'), zaangz ('elephant')
p	/pʰ/	porng ('shovel')
b	/p/	benx ('to become')
mb	/b/	mbuo ('us')
t	/tʰ/	tov ('to beg')
d	/t/	da'nyeic ('second')
nd	/d/	ndau ('ground')
k	/kʰ/	korqv ('gourd')
g	/k/	ganh ('oneself')
nq	/ɡ/	nqaang ('rear')
q (syllable-final)	/ʔ/	zuqc ('must')
c	/t͡sʰ/	congh ('from')
z	/t͡s/	zingh ('city wall')
nz	/d͡z/	nzangc ('character')
q (syllable-initial)	/t͡ɕʰ/	qam ('hug')
j	/t͡ɕ/	jaix ('penis')
nj	/d͡ʑ/	njiuv ('scissors')
f	/f/	fingx ('surname')
s	/s/	siang ('new')
h	/h/	hoqc ('learn')
y	/j/	yie ('I')
w	/w/	wetv ('dig')
hl	/l̥/	hlo ('big')
l	/l/	laengz (accept)

Vowels
Spelling	IPA	Example
a	/ɐ/	japv ('to cut with scissors')
aa	/a/	maa ('mother')
aai	/aːɪ/	laai ('final')
aau	/aːʊ/	saau ('to socialize')
ae	/æ/	dae ('father')
ai	/aɪ/	lai ('vegetable')
au	/aʊ/	ndau ('ground')
e	/e/	heh ('shoe')
ei	/ɛɪ/	meih ('you')
er	/ɜ/	sern (a raw meat dish)
eu	/ɜo/	beu ('to wrap')
i	/i/	i ('two')
o	/o/	go ('far')
oi	/oɪ/	oix ('like')
or	/ɒ/	porng ('shovel')
ou	/əu/	sou ('book')
u	/u/	uv ('gestures')

Tones
Spelling	IPA	Example
v	/˦/, /˦˥/	maaiv ('lopsided')
h	/˧˩/	maaih ('to have')
∅	/˧/	maai ('basic tail of bird')
c	/˨/, /˨˩/	maaic ('to sell')
x	/˨˧/	maaix ('nightmare')
z	/˨˧/, /˨˧˨/	maaiz ('to buy')

== Films ==
The following films feature the Iu Mien language:

- 2003 – Death of a Shaman. Directed by Richard Hall; produced by Fahm Fong Saeyang. Heartbreaking documentary of identities of a Mien daughter and her shaman father.
- 2010 – "Siang-Caaux Mienh". A Christian propaganda story of an irresponsible family man, alcoholic, and drug addict. He likes his bad friends but he does not love his family. But as he starts paying his mistakes, has become a turning point in his life.
- 2011 – "Mborqv Jaax Ciangv". A Christian propaganda movie.

== Notes ==
=== References ===
- Lombard, Sylvia J. (1968). Yao–English Dictionary. Data Paper No. 69. Ithaca, New York: Cornell University. hdl:1813/57537.
- Smith, Panh (2002). Modern English–Mienh and Mienh–English Dictionary. Victoria, BC: Trafford. ISBN 1-55369-711-1.
- Waters, Tony (1990). "Adaptation and Migration among the Mien People of Southeast Asia". Ethnic Groups. 8: 127–141.
- Mao, Zongwu 毛宗武; Meng, Chaoji 蒙朝吉; Zheng, Zongze 郑宗泽, eds. (1982). Yáo yǔ jiǎnzhì 瑶语简志 [Overview of the Yao Language] (in Chinese). Beijing: Minzu chubanshe.
- Mao, Zongwu 毛宗武 (2004). Yáozú Miǎn yǔ fāngyán yánjiū 瑶族勉语方言研究 [Studies in Mien Dialects of the Yao Nationality] (in Chinese). Beijing: Minzu chubanshe.
- Zhou, Minglang (2003). Multilingualism in China: The Politics of Writing Reforms for Minority Languages, 1949–2002. Berlin: Walter de Gruyter. ISBN 3-11-017896-6.
- "Mien of Thailand". OMF International. Archived from the original on 2010-10-13.

Dissertations

- Court, Christopher (1985). Fundamentals of Iu Mien (Yao) Grammar (Ph.D. thesis). University of California, Berkeley.
- Arisawa, Tatsuro Daniel (2016). An Iu Mien Grammar: A Tool for Language Documentation and Revitalisation (Ph.D. thesis). La Trobe University. hdl:1959.9/561960.
