= Mienic languages =

Language family of China and Southeast Asia

Mienic
- Yao
- Geographic distribution: China, Vietnam, Laos, Thailand, United States
- Ethnicity: some of the Yao peoples
- Linguistic classification: Hmong–Mien: Mienic
- Proto-language: Proto-Mienic
- Subdivisions: Iu Mien; Biao Mon; Kim Mun; Biao Min; Zaominic (Dzao Min and Yangchun Pai Yao)

Language codes
- Glottolog: mien1242
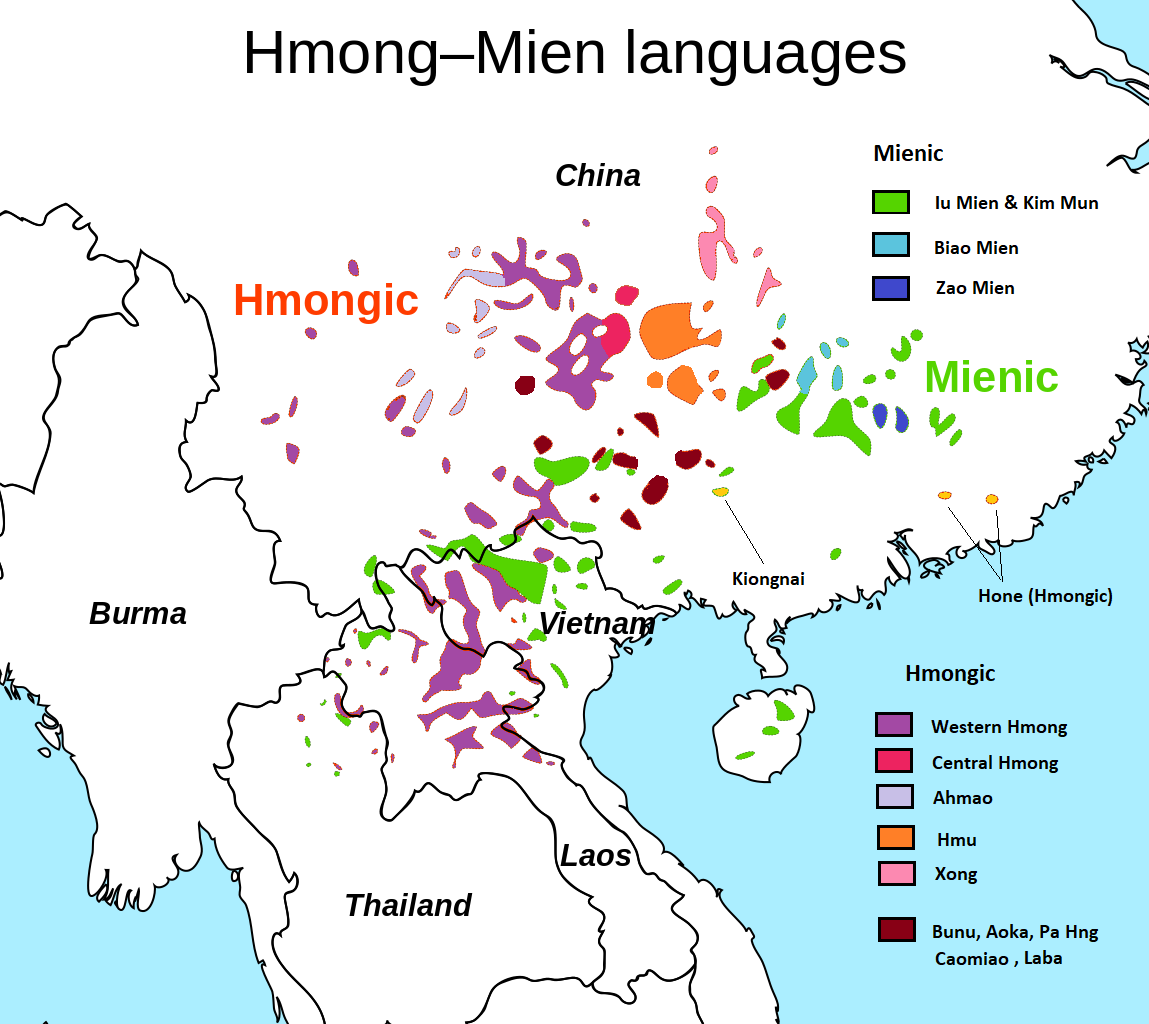
- Mienic languages: Iu Mien & Kim Mun Biao Min Dzao Min Not shown: Biao Mon

The Mienic or Yao languages are spoken by the Yao people of China, Vietnam, Laos, and Thailand.

Some of the Yao peoples speak Hmongic languages (Miao); these are called Bunu. A small population of Yao people in Jinxiu Yao Autonomous County (金秀瑶族自治县) in eastern Guangxi speak a Tai-Kadai language called Lakkia. Other Yao peoples speak various Sinitic (Chinese) language varieties.

== Classification ==
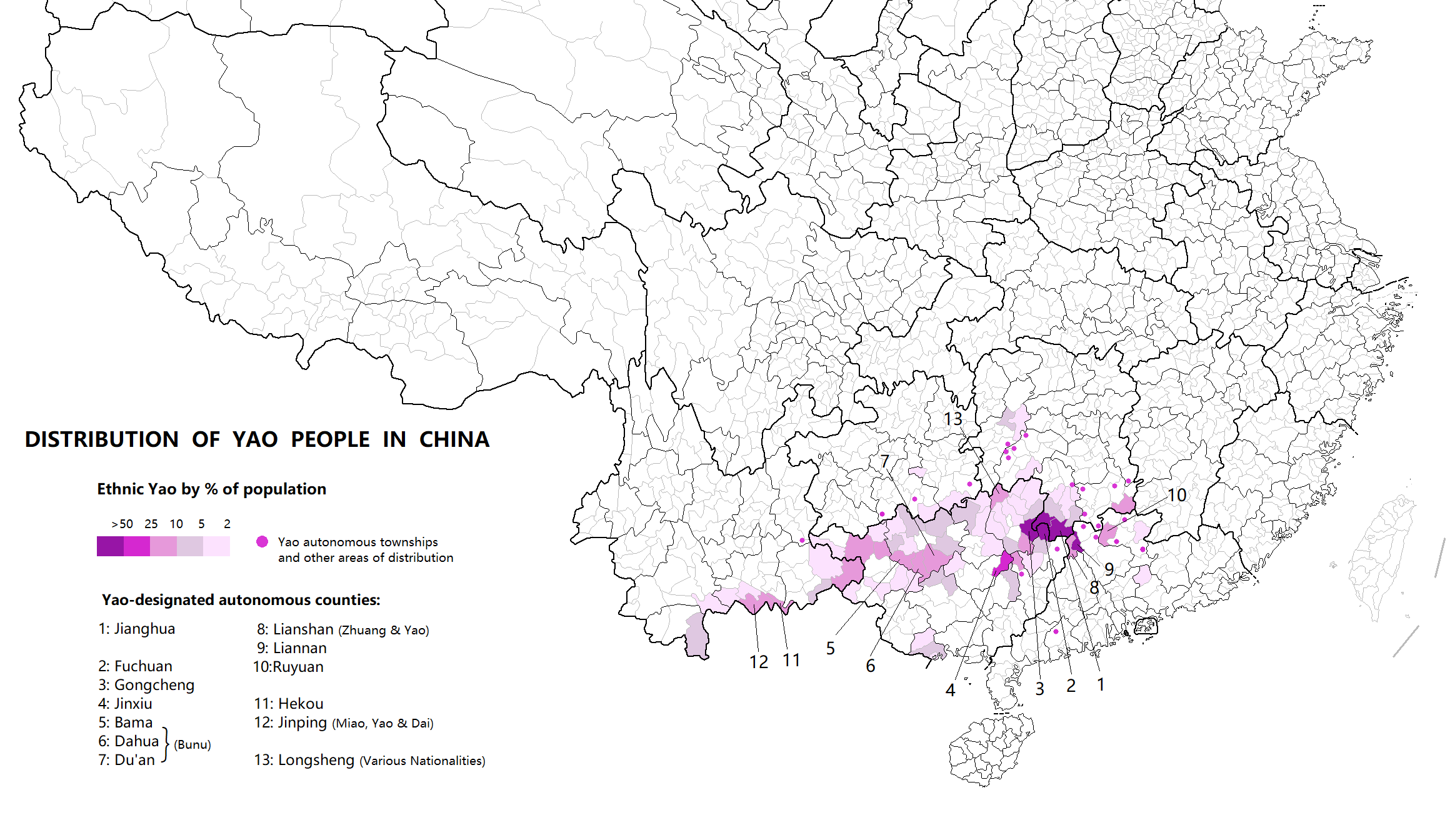
Distribution of Yao (Iu-Mien speakers) population in China

Mienic is one of the primary branches of the Hmong–Mien language family, with the other being Hmongic.

=== Ratliff (2010) ===
Martha Ratliff (2010:3) proposed the following classification:

- Mienic
  - Iu Mien, 840,000 speakers
  - Kim Mun, 400,000 speakers
  - Biao Min, 43,000 speakers
  - Dzao Min, 60,000 speakers

=== Strecker (1987) ===
Strecker 1987, followed (with the addition of Moxi) by Matisoff 2001, proposed the following, with some of the more divergent varieties as additional languages:

- Mienic (Yao)
  - Biao–Jiao:
    - Biao Min
    - Chao Kong Meng
    - Moxi
  - Mian–Jin:
    - Biao Mon
    - Iu Mien
    - Kim Mun
  - Zaomin: Dzao Min

=== Luang-Thongkum (1993) ===
Luang-Thongkum (1993:170) proposes the following classification for Mjuenic, a proposed branch consisting of the Mien, Mun, and Muen (Biao Mon) languages. The classifications of Biao Min and Dzao Min are not addressed.

- Proto-Mjuenic
  - Mun
    - West Mun (Landian Yao 蓝靛瑶)
    - East Mun (Shanzi Yao 山子瑶)
  - (Mien-Muen)
    - Muen (Ao Yao 坳瑶)
    - Mien (Pan Yao 盘瑶)
      - North Mien
      - East Mien, West Mien

=== Mao (2004) ===
Mao Zongwu (2004) classifies the Mienic languages varieties of China as follows. Data points studied in Mao (2004) are also listed for each dialect.

- Mien 勉: 550,000 speakers
  - Guangdian 广滇 dialect: 400,000 speakers
    - Dapingjiang, Jianxin village, Jiangdi township, Longsheng County (龙胜县江底乡建新村大坪江屯)
    - Shinongjiao village, Daxiaohe township, Guanyang County (灌阳县大小河乡石弄脚村)
    - Xianjiacao, Liuding village, Sanjiao township, Jinxiu County (金秀县三角乡六定村仙家槽屯)
    - Fengle village, Panshi township, Rongjiang County (榕江县盘石乡丰乐村)
    - Miaozhu village, Gongkeng township, Ruyuan County (乳源县公坑乡苗竹村)
    - Shuizi'ao village, Liangchahe township, Jianghua County (江华县两岔河乡水子坳村)
    - Yanbian village, Shilixiang township, Jinping County (云南省红河哈尼族彝族自治州金平苗族瑶族傣族自治县十里香乡百岩边村)
  - Xiangnan 湘南 dialect: 130,000 speakers
    - Miaoziyuan village, Xiangjiang township, Jianghua County (湖南永州市江华瑶族自治县湘江乡庙子源村)
    - Ganziyuan village, Mianhuaping township, Ningyuan County (湖南省永州市宁远县棉花坪乡柑子园村)
  - Luoxiang 罗香 (Ao Biao 坳标) dialect: 3,000 speakers
    - Luoxiang township, Jinxiu County (广西来宾市金秀瑶族自治县罗香乡罗香村)
  - Changping 长坪 (Biao Man 标曼) dialect: 20,000 speakers in the counties of Mengshan, Pingdong, Zhaoping, and Lipu
    - Dongpingdong village, Changping township, Mengshan County (广西壮族自治区梧州市蒙山县长坪乡东坪垌村)
- Jinmen 金门: 220,000 speakers
  - Diangui 滇桂 dialect: 166,000 speakers
    - Xinzhai village, Liangzi township, Hekou County (云南省红河哈尼族彝族自治州河口瑶族自治县梁子乡新寨村)
    - Nacai village, Dulong township, Malipo County (云南省文山麻栗坡县都龙乡那才村)
    - Suoshanjiao village, Yaoqu township, Mengla County (云南省勐腊县瑶区乡梭山脚村)
    - Lanjin township, Lingyun County (广西壮族自治区百色市凌云县览金乡览金村)
    - Xintun, Jiajiang village, Sanjiao township, Jinxiu County (广西壮族自治区来宾市金秀瑶族自治县三角乡甲江村新屯)
  - Fanghai 防海 dialect: 60,000 speakers
    - Tansan township, Fangcheng District (广西壮族自治区防城县十万大山区滩散乡滩散村)
    - Xin'an village, Daping township, Qiongzhong County (海南省琼中黎族苗族自治县大平乡新安村)
- Biao Min 标敏: 40,000 speakers
  - Dongshan 东山 dialect: 35,000 speakers
    - Shuanglong, Huanglong village, Dongshan township, Quanzhou County (全州县东山乡黄龙村双龙屯)
  - Shikou 石口 dialect: 8,000 speakers
    - Shikou village, Sanjiang township, Gongcheng County (恭城县三江乡石口村)
  - Niuweizhai 牛尾寨 dialect: 2,000 speakers
    - Niuwei village, Sanjiang township, Gongcheng County (恭城县三江乡牛尾村)
- Zao Min 藻敏: 60,000 speakers
  - Daping township, Liannan County (连南县大坪乡大坪村)

A Mienic lect called bjau2 mwan2 ("Biao Man 标曼"), related to Mien of Changping and Luoxiang, is spoken in Liuchong 六冲, Qiaoting Township 桥亭乡, Pingle County 平乐县, Guangxi (Tang 1994); another "Biao Man 标曼" dialect is spoken in Dongpingdong 东坪洞 (Tang 1994). There are about 10,000 speakers in Mengshan, Lipu, Pingle, and Zhaoping counties.

The comparative vocabulary chart in Mao Zongwu (2004) consists of the following languages.

1. Guangdian Mien (Jiangdi); autonym: mjen31
2. Diangui Kim Mun (Liangzi); autonym: kjeːm33 mun33
3. Dongshan Biao Min; autonym: bjau31 min31
4. Daping Dzao Min; autonym: dzau53 min53
5. Xiangnan Mien (Miaoziyuan); autonym: mjəŋ31
6. Changping Mien ( = Biao Mon); autonym: bjau31 moːn31
7. Luoxiang Mien; autonym: bjau31 mwan31
8. Fanghai Kim Mun (Tansan); autonym: kiːm33 mun33
9. Shikou Biao Min ( = Chao Kong Meng); autonym: mɔu31 jɔu55
10. Niuweizhai Biao Min ( = Moxi); autonym: mɔ433 ɕi53

=== Aumann & Sidwell (2004) ===
Using Mao's (2004) new data, Aumann & Sidwell (2004) propose the following classification of the Mienic languages, based on innovations in rhotic consonants. This classification presents a bipartite division of the Mienic into a subgroup consisting of Iu Mien and Biao Min, and another subgroup consisting of Kim Mun and Dzao Min. Luoxiang is grouped with Kim Mun, while Changping is grouped with Dzao Min.

- Proto-Mien
  - Mien-Biao Min
    - Guangdian Mien
    - Xiangnan Mien
    - Biao Min
      - Dongshan
      - Shikou
  - Mun-Dzao
    - Luoxiang-Kim Mun
      - Luoxiang Mien
      - Kim Mun
    - Changping-Dzao Min
      - Changping Mien
      - Dzao Min

Aumann & Sidwell (2004) consider the following classification by Wang & Mao to be unlikely, which is based on the voicing of voiceless sonorants, a common areal feature.

- Proto-Mien
  - Luoxiang Mien
  - Iu Mien
    - Guangdian Mien
    - Xiangnan Mien
    - Dongshan Biao Min
  - Mun-Dzao
    - Shikou Biao Min
    - Kim Mun
    - (Branch)
      - Changping Mien
      - Dzao Min

=== Taguchi (2012) ===
Yoshihisa Taguchi's (2012) computational phylogenetic study classifies the Mienic languages as follows.

- - Hmongic
  - Mienic
    - Zao Min
    - - Biao Min (Dongshan)
      - - Biao Min (Shikou)
        - - Kim Mun (Diangui)
          - - Mien (Changping, Luoxiang)
            - Mien (Guangdian, Xiangnan)

=== Hsiu (2018) ===
Hsiu's (2018) computational phylogenetic study classifies the Mienic languages as follows.

- Mienic
  - Zao Min
  - Greater Biao Min
    - Biao Min (Dongshan)
    - Biao Min (Guanyang)
    - Moyou (Shikou)
    - Moxi (Niuweizhai)
  - Greater Biao Mon
    - Biao Mon (Changping Mien)
    - Biao Mwan (Luoxiang Mien) (?)
  - Kim Mun
  - Iu Mien

Hsiu (2018) considers Changping Mien to have been influenced by Kim Mun lects due to geographical proximity, although it retains many unique forms that indicate it should belong in its own branch.

=== Hsiu (2023) ===
Hsiu (2023) announced the discovery of the previously undocumented Yangchun Pai Yao, likely a sister branch to Dzao Min, or possibly belonging to its own branch outright.

== Mixed languages ==
Some languages may be mixed Chinese and Mienic (Yao) languages, such as:

- Various Plains Yao (平地瑶) spoken varieties:
  - Younian
  - Jianghua Tuhua
  - Yuebei Tuhua, the language of the nüshu script, is an unclassified variety of Chinese spoken by ethnic Yao. Its origin is obscure, but it may have started out as a Sinicized Mienic language.
- Shanke, spoken mostly in Zhejiang and Fujian

== Numerals ==
Numerals in Mienic Languages
Language	One	Two	Three	Four	Five	Six	Seven	Eight	Nine	Ten
Proto-Hmong-Mien	*ʔɨ	*ʔu̯i	*pjɔu	*plei	*prja	*kruk	*dzjuŋH	*jat	*N-ɟuə	*gju̯əp
Iu Mien	jet˩˨	i˧	pwo˧	pjei˧	pia˧	tɕu˥	sje˩˧	ɕet˩˨	dwo˧˩	tsjop˩˨
Ao Biao (Luoxiang)	jit˦˧	vi˧	pu˧	pje˧	pla˧	kwo˦˧	ȵi˩	jat˧˨	du˧˩	ɕep˧˨
Biao Mon (Changping)	no˧˥	i˧	pu˧	plei˧	pla˧	kju˥˧	ŋi˨	jaːt˨˩	du˨˩	sjəp˨˩
Kim Mun	a˧	i˧˥	ˀpɔ˧˥	pjei˧˥	pja˧˥	kjo˧˥	ȵi˦˨	jet˥	du˧	ʃap˦˨
Biao Min	i˧	wəi˧	pau˧	pləi˧	pla˧	klɔ˥˧	ni˦˨	hjɛn˦˨	iu˧˩	ȶʰan˦˨
Chao Kong Meng (Shikou)	ji˧˥	vi˧	bɔu˧	pli˧	pla˥˧	klɔ˧˥	ŋi˩˧	jæ˨	tɕu˥	tɕæ˨
Moxi (Niuweizhai)	i˧	wei˧	pəu˧	pɣɯi˧	pɤa˧	kɤɔ˥	ɕi˧˩	hjɯ˥˧	du˥˧	tɕʰwa˥˧
Dzao Min	a˦	vi˦˨	bu˦˨	pɛi˦˨	pjɛ˦˨	tɔu˦	ȵi˨	dzat˨	ku˥˧	sjɛp˨

== See also ==
- Proto-Mienic language
- List of Proto-Mienic reconstructions (Wiktionary)
- Mienic comparative vocabulary list (Wiktionary)
- Hmong-Mien comparative vocabulary list (Wiktionary)
