= Quanzhou (disambiguation) =

Quanzhou is a prefecture-level city in Fujian, China.

Quanzhou may also refer to:

- Quanzhou County, a county in Guangxi, China
- Quanzhou Town, a town in Quanzhou County

== Historical prefectures ==
- Quan Prefecture (Fujian), a prefecture between the 8th and 20th centuries in modern Fujian, China
- Quan Prefecture (Guangxi), a prefecture between the 10th and 20th centuries in modern Guangxi, China
