= Libu (disambiguation) =

Libu is an ancient Libyan tribe of Berber origin.

Libu may also refer to:

== Imperial Chinese government ==
- Ministry of Personnel, one of the Six Ministries
- Ministry of Rites, another one of the Six Ministries

== Places ==
- Libu, Guangdong (黎埠), a town in Yangshan County, Guangdong, China
- Libu, Guangxi (梨埠), a town in Cangwu County, Guangxi, China
- Libu, Hubei (李埠), a town in Jingzhou, Hubei, China
