= Qinglian =

Qinglian (青莲) may refer to:

- Qinglian, Chongqing, a town in Fengjie County, Chongqing, China
- Qinglian, Guangdong, a town in Yangshan County, Guangdong, China
- Qinglian, Jiangyou, a town in Jiangyou, Sichuan, China
- Qinglian, Nanchong, a town in Nanchong, Sichuan, China
