= Kim Mun language =

Mienic language of Asia

Kim Mun
- Kim Mun language
- Native to: China, Vietnam, Laos, Thailand
- Native speakers: (ca. 400,000 cited 1995–1999)
- Language family: Hmong–Mien: Mienic; Mian–Jin; Kim Mun

Official status
- Official language in: China (Jinxiu Yao Autonomous County)

Language codes
- ISO 639-3: mji
- Glottolog: kimm1245

Kim Mun (Chinese: 金門方言; also Lanten or Landian 蓝靛) is a Mienic language spoken by 200,000 of the Yao people in the Chinese provinces of Guangxi, Hunan and Yunnan, with about 61,000 of the speakers in Hainan Province. There are also speakers in Vietnam, Laos, and Thailand.

Iu Mien and Kim Mun are similar to each other, having a lexical similarity percentage of 78%.

== Distribution ==
In China, Kim Mun is spoken in the following counties (Mao 2004:304-305).

- Yunnan: Hekou, Malipo, Maguan, Xichou, Qiubei, Guangnan, Funing, Yanshan, Shizong, Jiangcheng, Mojiang, Yuanyang, Jinping, Lüchun, Mengla, Jinghong
- Guangxi: Xilin, Lingyun, Napo, Tianlin, Fengshan, Bama, Lipu, Pingle, Mengshan, Jinxiu, Yongfu, Luzhai, Fangcheng, Shangsi
- Hainan: Qiongzhong, Baoting, Qionghai, Tunchang, Ledong, Wanning, Sanya. In Hainan, Kim Mun speakers are officially classified by the Chinese government as ethnic Miao, rather than Yao.

Ethnologue lists several counties in Vietnam where Kim Mun is spoken (in Bac Giang province, Ha Giang province, Lao Cai province, Quang Ninh province, Tuyen Quang province and Yen Bai province).. Van Ban district of Lao Cai province is one of the primary areas where Kim Mun is spoken in Vietnam. In Vietnam, Dao people belonging to the Quần Trắng, Thanh Y, and Áo Dài subgroups speak Kim Mun. Kim Mun speakers are also found in northern Laos (in Luang Namtha province, Oudomxai province and in Bokeo province).

Daniel Arisawa has performed fieldwork with an isolated speaker of Kim Mun (originally from Laos) in Lampang province, northern Thailand (along the border of Mae Mo district and Ngao district).

== Phonology ==
=== Consonants ===
		Labial		Dental		Alveolar		(Alveolo-) palatal	Velar			Glottal	
		plain	pal.	plain	pal.	plain	pal.	(Alveolo-) palatal	plain	lab.	pal.	plain	pal.
Nasal		m	mʲ			n	nʲ	ȵ	ŋ	ŋʷ			
Stop	voiceless	p	pʲ			t	tʲ	ȶ	k	kʷ	kʲ	ʔ	
Stop	voiced	b	bʲ			d	dʲ	ȡ	ɡ	ɡʷ	ɡʲ		
Affricate	voiceless			(tθ)	(tθʲ)	ts							
Affricate	voiced			(dð)	(dðʲ)	dz							
Fricative	voiceless	f		θ	θʲ	s	sʲ	(ɕ)				h	hʲ
Fricative	voiced	v		ð	ðʲ								
Lateral						l	lʲ	ȴ					
Approximant								j		w			

- Lateral-released sounds are also present as /pˡ, bˡ, tˡ, dˡ, kˡ, ɡˡ/.
- Fricative sounds /θ, θʲ, ð, ðʲ/ are realized as affricate sounds [tθ, tθʲ, dð, dðʲ] in the Liangzi dialect.
- /d/ may also be heard as a retroflex [ɖ] in free variation in the Liangzi dialect.
- /s/ may also be heard as [ɕ] in different positions in the Liangzi dialect.
- Palatalized sounds /kʲ/, /ɡʲ/, /hʲ/; can also be heard as palatal sounds [c], [ɟ], [ç]; in free variation.
- Sounds /b, d, ȡ/ are more stiff-voiced [b̬, d̬, d̠̬ʲ] in free variation.
- Sounds /p, t, k/ are heard as unreleased [p̚, t̚, k̚] in word-final position.

=== Vowels ===
	Front	Central	Back
Close	i		u
Close-mid	e		o
Mid		(ə)	
Open-mid	ɛ	ɐ	ɔ
Open		a aː	

- /ɐ/ is heard as [ə] in the Laos dialects of Kim Mun.
- /i, u/ can be heard as [ɪ, ʊ] when in closed syllables.
- /o/ may be labialized as [oʷ] in word-final position.
- /e/ may have a palatal off-glide as [eʲ] in word-final syllables.
- /ɔ/ when before a velar consonant can be heard as a diphthong [aʊ].
- /o, ɔ/ may also be heard as lowered [ɔ̞, ɒ] in free variation in the Laos dialects.
