= Yangchun Pai Yao language =

Extinct Mienic language of Guangdong, China

Yangchun Pai Yao
- Native to: China
- Region: Yangchun, Guangdong
- Ethnicity: Yao
- Extinct: Effectively extinct, one elderly partial speaker remaining as of 2019
- Language family: Hmong–Mien: Mienic; Yangchun Pai Yao

Language codes
- ISO 639-3: None (mis)
- Glottolog: yang1310

Yangchun Pai Yao is an extinct Mienic language of Yangchun, Guangdong, China. It is unclassified within Mienic, and is likely a sister branch to Dzao Min.

== Documentation ==
The 1996 Yangchun County Gazetteer (阳春县志) has just over a dozen Yangchun Pai Yao words that were transcribed in Chinese characters. According to the gazetteer, there were 13 semi-speakers remaining in the 1990s. Hsiu (2023) reported that the language was extinct in 2019, with only one elderly rememberer able to provide a few dozen words.
