= Dzao Min language =

Hmong–Mien language spoken in China

Dzao Min
- Ba Pai
- Native to: China
- Region: Guangdong, Hunan
- Native speakers: (60,000 cited 1995)
- Language family: Hmong–Mien: Mienic; Zaominic; Dzao Min

Language codes
- ISO 639-3: bpn
- Glottolog: dzao1238

Dzao Min (Chinese: 藻敏, Zao Min) is a Hmong–Mien language of China. Mao (2004:306) reports a total of more than 60,000 speakers in Liannan County and Yangshan County of Guangdong, and in Yizhang County of Hunan. The speakers from Bapai, Guangdong are also called Bapai Yao (八排瑶族).

The earliest published study of Dzao Min is that of Wong (1939).

== Distribution ==
The Chenzhou Prefecture Gazetteer (1996) reports that there are 1,200 "Bapai Yao" (八排瑶) or "Zao Min" (藻敏) in Huangjiapan Village 黄家畔村, Mangshan Township 莽山乡, Yizhang County, Hunan. They are reported to have migrated from Taipingdong 太平洞, Chengjia District 称架区, Yangshan County, Guangdong in the 16th century.

Long Guoyi (2011) covers the six Zao Min dialects of Daping 大坪, Junliao 军寮, Mangshan 莽山, Nan'gang 南岗, Panshi 盘石, and Youling 油岭. All of the aforementioned locations are in Liannan County, Guangdong, except for Mangshan, which is in Yizhang County, Hunan. Long reports that other than in Liannan County, small pockets of Zao Min speakers are located in:

- Taipingdong Village, Chengjia District, Yangshan County 阳山县秤架区太平洞村
- Huangjiabang Village, Mangshan Township, Yizhang County 宜章县莽山乡黄家塝村 (only one elderly speaker left)
- Longxi Village, Dongping Township, Ruyuan County 乳源县东坪镇龙溪村
- Lianshan County 连山壮族瑶族自治县
- Yangchun County 阳春县 (in Guigang 圭岗镇 and Yongning 永宁镇 towns), identified by Hsiu (2023) as a distinctive lect known as Yangchun Pai Yao. In Yongning Town 永宁镇, there are some elderly Zao Min (locally known as Pai Yao 排瑶) speakers surnamed Mai 麦 who are located in Tiedong 铁垌瑶族村 village; the Mai 麦 clan's genealogical records claim that their ancestors had migrated from Nanxiong. On the other hand, the Guoshan Yao 过山瑶 of neighboring Hengdong 横垌瑶族村 village, who belong to the Zhao 赵 clan, can all speak Iu Mien. Yangchun County has 8,228 ethnic Yao and 450 Yao speakers. There are also ethnic Yao living in Yunrong village 云容瑶族自治村 of Yangchun County. According to Hsiu (2023), based on about 40 words collected in August 2019 from the last remaining speaking of Yangchun Pai Yao, Yangchun Pai Yao is a previously unidentified distinct language that can either be considered to be a sister of Dzao Min, or a separate branch of Mienic altogether.

== Works cited ==
- Mao, Zongwu 毛宗武 (2004). Yáozú Miǎn yǔ fāngyán yánjiū 瑤族勉语方言研究 [A Study of Mien Dialects] (in Chinese). Beijing: Minzu chubanshe.
