= Quanzhou Town =

Town in Quanzhou County, Guangxi, China

Coordinates: 25.9259°N 111.0637°E

Quanzhou (全州镇) is a town in Quanzhou County, Guangxi, China. In 1851 the town's population was massacred by rebel forces during the Taiping Rebellion after a Qing soldier from the city fired a shot that killed Feng Yunshan.
