= Guanyang County =

Guanyang County 灌阳县 • Gvan'yangz Yen Kwanyang
- County
- Location of the seat in Guangxi
- Coordinates: 25°29′N 111°09′E
- Country: China
- Autonomous region: Guangxi
- Prefecture-level city: Guilin
- County seat: Guanyang Town

Area
  - Total: 1,863 km^{2} (719 sq mi)
- Time zone: UTC+8 (China Standard)

Guanyang County (simplified Chinese: 灌阳县; traditional Chinese: 灌陽縣; pinyin: Guànyáng Xiàn; Zhuang language: Gvan'yangz Yen) is a county in the northeast of the Guangxi Zhuang Autonomous Region, China, bordering Hunan province to the east. It is under the administration of Guilin city.

== Administrative divisions ==
Guanyang County is divided into 6 towns, 1 township and 2 ethnic townships:

towns

- Guanyang Town 灌阳镇
- Huangguan Town 黄关镇
- Wenshi Town 文市镇
- Xinjie Town 新街镇
- Xinxu Town 新圩镇
- Shuiche Town 水车镇

township

- Guanyinge Township 观音阁乡

ethnic townships

- Dongjing Yao Ethnic Township 洞井瑶族乡
- Xishan Yao Ethnic Township 西山瑶族乡

== Ethnic subgroups ==
Yao ethnic subgroups and dialect areas of Guanyang County are:

- Pan Yao 盘瑶
  - Iu Mien 优勉, Guoshan Yao 过山瑶
    - Dahejiang 大河江, Yezhudian 野猪殿, and Baoliang 保良 of Dongjing 洞井
    - Xiaohejiang 小河江 of Dongjing 洞井, Panjiang 盘江 of Guanyin'ge 观音阁
    - Doushui 陡水, Dazhushan 大竹山, and Shunxi 顺溪 of Huanguan 黄关
  - Biao Min
    - Dialect area 1
      - Hongqi Township 红旗乡: Wenhua 文化, Xiufeng 秀凤, Shangwang 上王, Helong 鹤龙
      - Xinyu Township 新圩乡: Hongshuiqing 洪水箐, Guiyang 贵阳
      - Shuiche Township 水车乡: Shangpao 上泡, Xiapao 下泡, Dongliu 东流, Hecheng 合成, Sanhuang 三皇, Xiumu 修睦
    - Dialect area 2
      - Jiangtang, Shuiche 水车乡江塘; Baizhuping, Wenshi 文市镇白竹坪
- White-Collar / Bailing Yao 白领瑶. The Bailing Yao speak a form of Pinghua called Youjia(hua) 优家话.
  - Xishan Township 西山瑶族乡: Lannitang 烂泥塘, Yantang 盐塘, Lingdi 灵地, Hongtou 江头, Huangnibang 黄泥榜, Jiangkou 江口, Beishajian 北沙涧, Chayuan 茶源
  - Xinjie Township 新街乡: Liexijian 烈溪涧
  - Hongqi Township 红旗乡: Dayuan 大源, Fanshen 翻身, Matou 马头, Yutang 鱼塘, Paibujiang 排埠江
  - Xinwei Township 新圩乡: Chaoli 潮立
- Four-Village / Sicun Yao 四村瑶. The Sicun Yao speak a form of Pinghua called Sicun(hua) 四村话. It is related to Youjia(hua) 优家话, which is spoken by the neighboring Bailing Yao 白领瑶.
  - Dongjiang Township 洞井瑶族乡: Baoliang 保良
- Jiaojiang Yao 蕉江瑶. The Jiaojiang Yao speak a form of Pinghua of the same name (Jiaojiang Yao 蕉江瑶语).
  - Xishan Township 西山瑶族乡: Daping 大坪, Batang 扒塘, Jiangkou 江口, Henglutou 横路头, Zhendongjiang 正东江
  - Hongqi Township 红旗乡: Fanshen 翻身, Matou 马头, Dayuan 大源, Yutang 鱼塘

== Climate ==
Climate data for Guanyang, elevation 263 m (863 ft), (1991–2020 normals, extremes 1981–2010)
Month	Jan	Feb	Mar	Apr	May	Jun	Jul	Aug	Sep	Oct	Nov	Dec	Year
Record high °C (°F)	26.2 (79.2)	30.7 (87.3)	32.8 (91.0)	34.1 (93.4)	35.4 (95.7)	36.9 (98.4)	39.2 (102.6)	39.0 (102.2)	38.2 (100.8)	36.0 (96.8)	32.9 (91.2)	27.0 (80.6)	39.2 (102.6)
Mean daily maximum °C (°F)	10.8 (51.4)	13.5 (56.3)	17.1 (62.8)	23.4 (74.1)	27.5 (81.5)	30.3 (86.5)	33.0 (91.4)	32.7 (90.9)	29.6 (85.3)	24.8 (76.6)	19.7 (67.5)	13.8 (56.8)	23.0 (73.4)
Daily mean °C (°F)	7.0 (44.6)	9.4 (48.9)	13.0 (55.4)	18.7 (65.7)	22.7 (72.9)	25.7 (78.3)	27.8 (82.0)	27.2 (81.0)	24.2 (75.6)	19.5 (67.1)	14.3 (57.7)	8.9 (48.0)	18.2 (64.8)
Mean daily minimum °C (°F)	4.4 (39.9)	6.7 (44.1)	10.2 (50.4)	15.3 (59.5)	19.2 (66.6)	22.7 (72.9)	24.1 (75.4)	23.5 (74.3)	20.7 (69.3)	15.9 (60.6)	10.7 (51.3)	5.7 (42.3)	14.9 (58.9)
Record low °C (°F)	−3.3 (26.1)	−2.3 (27.9)	−0.7 (30.7)	4.0 (39.2)	9.0 (48.2)	12.5 (54.5)	16.5 (61.7)	18.1 (64.6)	11.5 (52.7)	3.8 (38.8)	−1.0 (30.2)	−5.5 (22.1)	−5.5 (22.1)
Average precipitation mm (inches)	82.7 (3.26)	93.7 (3.69)	162.0 (6.38)	197.9 (7.79)	259.6 (10.22)	254.5 (10.02)	161.6 (6.36)	119.0 (4.69)	59.3 (2.33)	67.6 (2.66)	78.4 (3.09)	61.4 (2.42)	1,597.7 (62.91)
Average precipitation days (≥ 0.1 mm)	15.2	14.3	19.6	18.4	18.7	18.2	14.0	14.4	9.4	8.1	9.8	10.8	170.9
Average snowy days	2.6	1.2	0.1	0	0	0	0	0	0	0	0	0.9	4.8
Average relative humidity (%)	78	79	82	81	82	83	78	78	77	75	75	74	79
Mean monthly sunshine hours	49.3	47.8	50.9	78.8	104.1	111.8	191.2	175.4	136.4	117.7	100.4	86.3	1,250.1
Percentage possible sunshine	15	15	14	21	25	27	46	44	37	33	31	26	28
Source: China Meteorological Administration
