= Martha Ratliff =

American linguist

- Born: 1946 (age 79–80)
- Occupation: Linguist

Academic background
- Education: University of Chicago
- Thesis: The Morphological Functions of Tone in White Hmong (1986)

Academic work
- Institutions: Wayne State University
- Main interests: Hmong–Mien languages
- Notable works: Hmong-Mien language history (2010)

Martha Ratliff is an American linguist and Professor Emerita at Wayne State University. She is a leading specialist in Hmong–Mien languages and also notable for her reconstruction of Proto-Hmong–Mien.

Ratliff earned a B.A. in English from Carleton College in 1968, an M.A.T. in English Education from University of Chicago in 1970, and a Ph.D. in Linguistics from University of Chicago in 1986, with a dissertation entitled The Morphological Functions of Tone in White Hmong.

She currently serves as an associate editor for the historical linguistics journal Diachronica. She is co-founder of the Southeast Asian Linguistics Society along with Eric Schiller.

== Publications ==
- Ratliff, Martha (1992). Meaningful Tone: A Study of Tonal Morphology in Compounds, Form Classes, and Expressive Phrases in White Hmong. Dekalb, Illinois: Center for Southeast Asian Studies, Northern Illinois University. ISBN 1-877979-77-5.
- Ratliff, Martha (2004). "Vocabulary of Environment and Subsistence in the Hmong–Mien Protolanguage". In Tapp; Michaud; Culas; Lee (eds.). Symposium on the Hmong/Miao in Asia. Chiang Mai, Thailand: Silkworm Books. pp. 147–165. Manuscript.
- Ratliff, Martha (2010). Hmong-Mien language history. Canberra, Australia: Pacific Linguistics. ISBN 978-0-85883-615-0.
- Newman, Paul and Martha Ratliff. 2001. Linguistic Fieldwork. Cambridge University Press.
- 玛莎·拉特利夫 [Martha Ratliff] (2019). Miao Yao yuyan lishi yanjiu [苗瑶语言历史研究]. Beijing: China Social Sciences Press. ISBN 9787520351775 (Chinese translation of Ratliff's 2010 book, Hmong-Mien language history)
- Newman, Paul; Ratliff, Martha, eds. (2001). Linguistic Fieldwork. Cambridge: Cambridge University Press. doi:10.1017/cbo9780511810206. ISBN 978-0-521-66937-5.
