= Quanzhou County =

Quanzhou County 全州县 · Cenzcouh Yen
- County
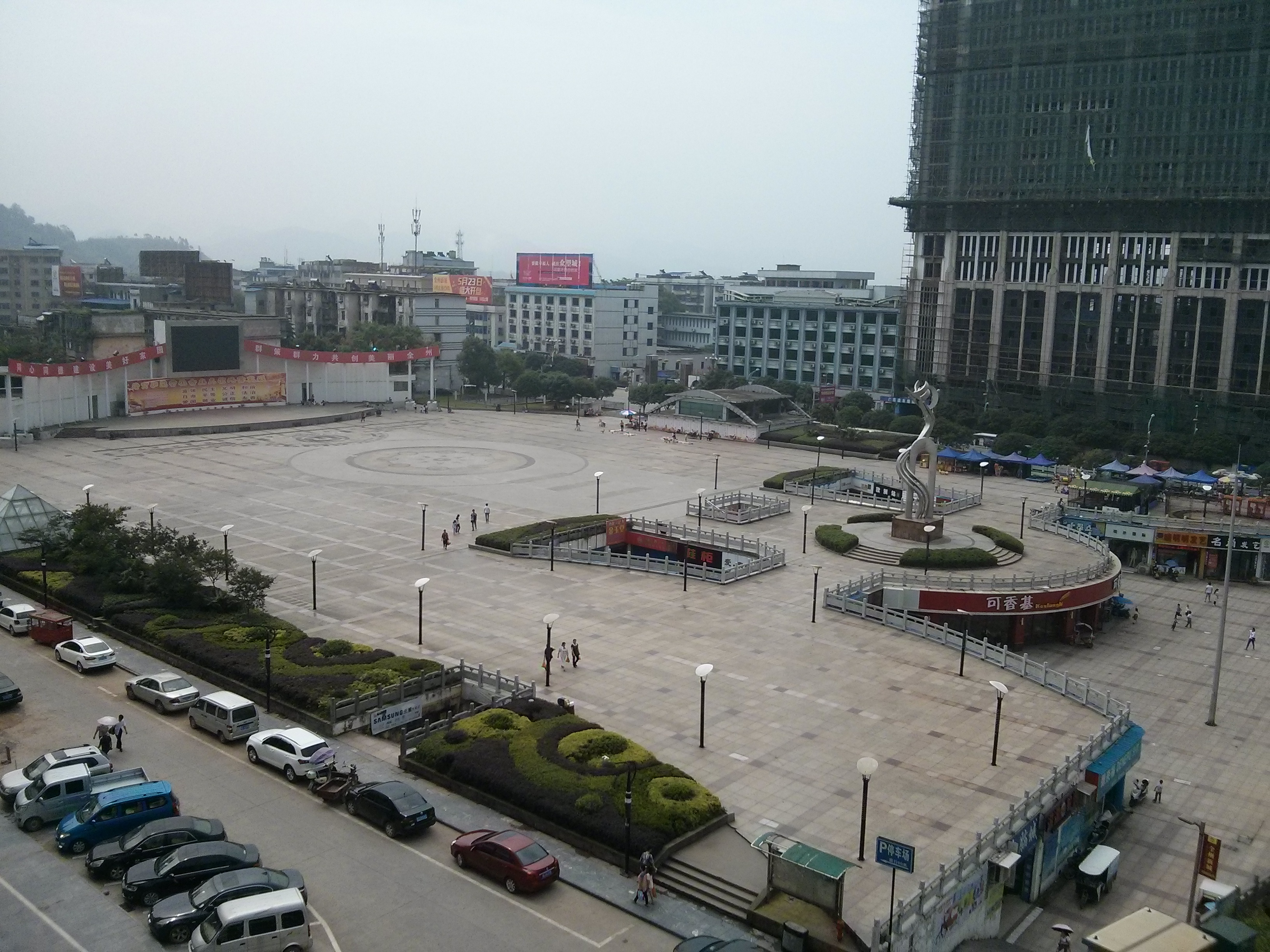
- Public square

- Location of the seat in Guangxi
- Coordinates: 25°55′44″N 111°04′23″E
- Country: China
- Autonomous region: Guangxi
- Prefecture-level city: Guilin
- County seat: Quanzhou Town

Area
  - Total: 4,021 km^{2} (1,553 sq mi)

Population (2010)
  - Total: 803,495
  - Density: 200/km^{2} (520/sq mi)
- Time zone: UTC+8 (China Standard)
- Postal code: 541500

Quanzhou County (Chinese: 全州县; pinyin: Quánzhōu Xiàn; Zhuang: Cenzcouh Yen) is a county in the northeast of Guangxi, China, bordering Hunan province to the north and east. It is under the administration of Guilin City. Quanzhou is the biggest county in Guilin both in size and in population. The dialect here belongs to the Xiang Chinese.

Historically, Quanzhou was under the administration of Hunan Province. It was only after the Ming Dynasty (1368CE - 1644CE) that it was removed from Hunan into Guangxi.

== Administrative divisions ==
Quanzhou County administers 15 towns, 1 township, and 2 ethnic townships.

Towns

- Quanzhou (全州镇)
- Huangshahe (黄沙河镇)
- Miaotou (庙头镇)
- Wenqiao (文桥镇)
- Daxijiang (大西江镇)
- Longshui (龙水镇)
- Caiwan (才湾镇)
- Shaoshui (绍水镇)
- Shitang (石塘镇)
- Xianshui (咸水镇)
- Fenghuang (凤凰镇)
- Anhe (安和镇)
- Lianghe (两河镇)
- Jiantang (枧塘镇)
- Yongsui (永岁镇)

Townships

- Baibao Township (白宝乡)

Ethnic townships

- Jiaojiang Yao Ethnic Township (蕉江瑶族乡)
- Dongshan Yao Ethnic Township (东山瑶族乡)

== Demographics ==
=== Language ===
Four Yao languages are spoken by the Yao people of Quanzhou County:

- Mien (Chinese: 勉; pinyin: Miǎn)
- Kim Mun (Chinese: 金门; pinyin: Jīnmén)
- Ao Min (Chinese: 邀敏; pinyin: Yāomǐn)
- Biao Min (Chinese: 标敏; pinyin: Biāomǐn)

Within Quanzhou County, the Biao Min language is divided into the following five different dialect groups:

- The Qingshui (Chinese: 清水), Zhuwu (Chinese: 竹坞), Shangtang (Chinese: 上塘), Xiaoheping (Chinese: 小和平), Huangladong (Chinese: 黄腊洞), Huanglong (Chinese: 黄龙), and Leigongyan (Chinese: 雷公岩) group
- The Baizhu (Chinese: 白竹), Jingrong (Chinese: 锦荣), and Daping (Chinese: 大坪) group
- The Bailing (Chinese: 白岭), Liuzijie (Chinese: 六字介), and Shijianping (Chinese: 石枧坪) group
- The Gumu (Chinese: 古木) group
- The Xieshui (Chinese: 斜水) group

Much of the difference between local Biao Min dialects is in phonetics, rather than vocabulary. With the exception of the Xieshui dialect group, the dialect groups are largely mutually intelligible. A possible explanation for the divergence of the Xieshui dialect group from other Biao Min dialects is increased interaction with Han people in the area.

=== Ethnicity ===
The Yao people of Quanzhou County are mainly located in the county's two ethnic townships: Jiaojiang Yao Ethnic Township and Dongshan Yao Ethnic Township.

Dongshan Yao Ethnic Township is home to the largest Yao population in the county, comprising about 20,000 people across 4,800 households.

The second largest concentration is located in Jiaojiang Yao Ethnic Township, where about 1,900 ethnic Yao reside across 400 households. Within Jiaojiang, Banyaoshan Village (Chinese: 板瑶山村) is home to about 120 ethnic Yao, residing across 20 households.

While not an ethnic township, the town of Shaoshui also has a sizable Yao community, numbering about 900 people across 190 households. Within Shaoshui, Tongyou Village (Chinese: 桐油村) hosts about 200 ethnic Yao across 60 households.

== Climate ==
Climate data for Quanzhou, elevation 111 m (364 ft), (1991–2020 normals, extremes 1981–present)
Month	Jan	Feb	Mar	Apr	May	Jun	Jul	Aug	Sep	Oct	Nov	Dec	Year
Record high °C (°F)	26.2 (79.2)	30.3 (86.5)	34.0 (93.2)	34.8 (94.6)	36.8 (98.2)	37.0 (98.6)	39.2 (102.6)	40.2 (104.4)	37.7 (99.9)	37.2 (99.0)	32.6 (90.7)	26.5 (79.7)	40.2 (104.4)
Mean daily maximum °C (°F)	9.9 (49.8)	12.7 (54.9)	16.4 (61.5)	23.0 (73.4)	27.3 (81.1)	30.1 (86.2)	33.1 (91.6)	32.8 (91.0)	29.4 (84.9)	24.3 (75.7)	18.8 (65.8)	12.8 (55.0)	22.6 (72.6)
Daily mean °C (°F)	6.8 (44.2)	9.2 (48.6)	12.8 (55.0)	18.6 (65.5)	22.9 (73.2)	26.1 (79.0)	28.6 (83.5)	28.1 (82.6)	24.9 (76.8)	19.9 (67.8)	14.6 (58.3)	9.1 (48.4)	18.5 (65.2)
Mean daily minimum °C (°F)	4.6 (40.3)	6.8 (44.2)	10.2 (50.4)	15.6 (60.1)	19.8 (67.6)	23.3 (73.9)	25.3 (77.5)	24.8 (76.6)	21.7 (71.1)	16.9 (62.4)	11.5 (52.7)	6.4 (43.5)	15.6 (60.0)
Record low °C (°F)	−3.6 (25.5)	−3.0 (26.6)	0.4 (32.7)	4.4 (39.9)	10.0 (50.0)	14.7 (58.5)	17.5 (63.5)	18.2 (64.8)	13.2 (55.8)	6.3 (43.3)	−0.4 (31.3)	−4.4 (24.1)	−4.4 (24.1)
Average precipitation mm (inches)	79.0 (3.11)	92.4 (3.64)	187.6 (7.39)	199.1 (7.84)	290.2 (11.43)	254.3 (10.01)	156.6 (6.17)	126.1 (4.96)	53.1 (2.09)	63.3 (2.49)	81.7 (3.22)	57.8 (2.28)	1,641.2 (64.63)
Average precipitation days (≥ 0.1 mm)	14.6	14.5	19.3	17.7	17.4	16.5	12.8	12.0	7.8	7.4	9.2	10.1	159.3
Average snowy days	2.4	1.4	0.2	0	0	0	0	0	0	0	0	0.9	4.9
Average relative humidity (%)	77	78	81	80	80	81	75	75	75	72	73	71	77
Mean monthly sunshine hours	54.2	51.4	59.6	89.6	118.0	122.8	211.0	199.7	157.6	130.4	112.0	94.5	1,400.8
Percentage possible sunshine	16	16	16	23	28	30	50	50	43	37	35	29	31
Source: China Meteorological Administration all-time October record all-time May record high

== See also ==
- Biao Min language
- Yao people
