= Yongfu County =

Yongfu County 永福县 Yungfu
- County
- Location of the seat in Guangxi
- Coordinates: 24°58′48″N 109°58′59″E
- Country: China
- Autonomous region: Guangxi
- Prefecture-level city: Guilin
- County seat: Yongfu Town

Area
  - Total: 2,807 km^{2} (1,084 sq mi)
- Time zone: UTC+8 (China Standard)

Yongfu County (Chinese: 永福县; pinyin: Yǒngfú Xiàn) is a county under the administration of the prefecture-level city of Guilin, Guangxi, China, located 55 km (34 mi) to the southwest of downtown Guilin. The county is mostly rural and hilly, marked by the same dramatic karst topography for which Guilin is famous.

Yongfu is perhaps best known as a center of luohan guo (Siraitia grosvenorii) production, and in particular the town of Longjiang (龙江) has been called "the home of Chinese luohan guo".

Other agricultural products include mangosteens, honey, wild grapes, silkworms, rice, mushrooms, chestnuts, and yellow bamboo shoots.

== Administrative divisions ==
Yongfu County is divided into 6 towns and 3 townships:

towns

- Yongfu 永福镇
- Luojin 罗锦镇
- Baishou 百寿镇
- Suqiao 苏桥镇
- Sanhuang 三皇镇
- Baoli 堡里镇

townships

- Guangfu 广福乡
- Yong'an 永安乡
- Longjiang 龙江乡

== Climate ==
Climate data for Yongfu, elevation 157 m (515 ft), (1991–2020 normals, extremes 1981–present)
Month	Jan	Feb	Mar	Apr	May	Jun	Jul	Aug	Sep	Oct	Nov	Dec	Year
Record high °C (°F)	26.3 (79.3)	30.9 (87.6)	32.7 (90.9)	35.8 (96.4)	35.4 (95.7)	37.0 (98.6)	38.9 (102.0)	39.2 (102.6)	37.8 (100.0)	36.1 (97.0)	33.2 (91.8)	27.5 (81.5)	39.2 (102.6)
Mean daily maximum °C (°F)	12.1 (53.8)	14.6 (58.3)	17.8 (64.0)	24.0 (75.2)	28.1 (82.6)	30.7 (87.3)	32.8 (91.0)	33.2 (91.8)	31.0 (87.8)	26.5 (79.7)	21.0 (69.8)	15.1 (59.2)	23.9 (75.0)
Daily mean °C (°F)	8.5 (47.3)	10.9 (51.6)	14.1 (57.4)	19.6 (67.3)	23.7 (74.7)	26.3 (79.3)	27.9 (82.2)	27.9 (82.2)	25.6 (78.1)	21.2 (70.2)	15.9 (60.6)	10.5 (50.9)	19.3 (66.8)
Mean daily minimum °C (°F)	6.1 (43.0)	8.3 (46.9)	11.6 (52.9)	16.6 (61.9)	20.5 (68.9)	23.5 (74.3)	24.6 (76.3)	24.4 (75.9)	21.9 (71.4)	17.5 (63.5)	12.4 (54.3)	7.4 (45.3)	16.2 (61.2)
Record low °C (°F)	−1.7 (28.9)	−0.8 (30.6)	0.5 (32.9)	5.0 (41.0)	10.5 (50.9)	15.1 (59.2)	18.0 (64.4)	19.9 (67.8)	13.9 (57.0)	6.6 (43.9)	1.7 (35.1)	−2.5 (27.5)	−2.5 (27.5)
Average precipitation mm (inches)	84.6 (3.33)	89.3 (3.52)	165.7 (6.52)	205.0 (8.07)	351.1 (13.82)	487.6 (19.20)	272.3 (10.72)	170.9 (6.73)	81.6 (3.21)	70.6 (2.78)	85.5 (3.37)	63.6 (2.50)	2,127.8 (83.77)
Average precipitation days (≥ 0.1 mm)	14.5	14.6	20.6	19.0	19.0	19.3	17.4	12.6	8.8	7.5	9.7	10.3	173.3
Average snowy days	0.5	0.2	0	0	0	0	0	0	0	0	0	0.2	0.9
Average relative humidity (%)	76	77	82	82	82	84	81	79	76	73	74	72	78
Mean monthly sunshine hours	54.5	49.5	48.6	76.7	109.5	112.1	179.2	192.9	175.5	150.4	117.6	98.1	1,364.6
Percentage possible sunshine	16	15	13	20	26	27	43	48	48	42	36	30	30
Source: China Meteorological AdministrationAll-time April high
