= Biao Min language =

Hmong–Mien language spoken in China

Biao Min
- Biao-Jiao Mien
- Native to: China
- Native speakers: (43,000 cited 1995)
- Language family: Hmong–Mien: Mienic; Biao Min
- Dialects: Biao Min; Jiaogong Mian

Language codes
- ISO 639-3: bje
- Glottolog: biao1254

Biao Min, or Biao-Jiao Mien, is a Hmong–Mien language of China. The two varieties, Biao Min and Jiaogong Mian, are evidently not mutually intelligible.

== Distribution ==
Ethnologue reports the Biao Min language to be spoken in the following counties in China.

- Northeastern Guangxi: Quanzhou County, Guanyang County, and Gongcheng County
- Southern Hunan: Shuangpai County and Dao County

== Dialects ==
Dialects of Biao Min are as follows, according to Mao Zongwu (2004). Only the Biao Min varieties of Dongshan Yao Ethnic Township, Quanzhou County (全州县东山瑶族乡) and Sanjiang Township, Gongcheng County (恭城县三江乡) have been described in any detail.

- Dongshan 东山 dialect: 35,000 speakers in Shuanglong, Huanglong village, Dongshan township, Quanzhou County (全州县东山乡黄龙村双龙屯); autonym: bjau31 min31.
- Shikou 石口 dialect: 8,000 speakers in Shikou village, Sanjiang township, Gongcheng County (恭城县三江乡石口村); autonym: mɔu31 jɔu55. Also known as Chao Kong Meng (Chinese: 交公勉语) or Moruo (Chinese: 莫若) (Mao 2004:306).
- Niuweizhai 牛尾寨 dialect: 2,000 speakers in Niuwei village, Sanjiang township, Gongcheng County (恭城县三江乡牛尾村); autonym: mɔ433 ɕi53. Also known as Moxi (Chinese: 莫西瑶语). Yoshihisa Taguchi (2005) gives the autonym mo2 xi2 mũ2, and points out the contact relationships between it and Jiaogong Mien 交公勉 (Shikou). Taguchi (2005) reports that within Sanjiang Township 三江乡, it is spoken in the villages of Dalitian 大栗田村, Xiaolitian 小栗田村, and Niuwei 牛尾村.

Strecker (1987) uses "Chao Kong Meng" for Shikou, and "Moxi" for Niuweizhai.

Word lists for Biao Min dialects can be found in Mao Zongwu (2004).

=== Quanzhou County ===
Biao Min of Quanzhou County, Guangxi consists of the following five dialect areas (Quanzhou County Gazetteer 全州县志).

- Qingshui 清水, Zhuwu 竹坞, Shangtang 上塘, Xiaoheping 小和平, Huangladong 黄腊洞, Huanglong 黄龙, Leigongyan 雷公岩
- Baizhu 白竹, Jingrong 锦荣, Daping 大坪
- Bailing 白岭, Liuzijie 六字介, Shijianping 石枧坪
- Gumu 古木
- Xieshui 斜水

Xieshui 斜水 is the most divergent dialect, and is unintelligible with the other four dialects. The Xieshui dialect also has more Chinese influence than the other Biao Min dialects do.

=== Guanyang County ===
Biao Min of Guanyang County, Guangxi consists of the following two dialect areas (Guanyang County Gazetteer 灌阳县志).

- Dialect area 1
  - Hongqi Township 红旗乡: Wenhua 文化, Xiufeng 秀凤, Shangwang 上王, Helong 鹤龙
  - Xinyu Township 新圩乡: Hongshuiqing 洪水箐, Guiyang 贵阳
  - Shuiche Township 水车乡: Shangpao 上泡, Xiapao 下泡, Dongliu 东流, Hecheng 合成, Sanhuang 三皇, Xiumu 修睦
- Dialect area 2
  - Jiangtang, Shuiche 水车乡江塘; Baizhuping, Wenshi 文市镇白竹坪

The Jiangtang and Baizhuping dialects of Biao Min are documented in Hsiu (2017).

== See also ==
- Biao Min (Shikou) word list (Wiktionary)
