= Gongcheng Yao Autonomous County =

Gongcheng County 恭城县 · Gunghcwngz Yen Kungcheng
- County
- 恭城瑶族自治县; Gunghcwngz Yauzcuz Swciyen; Gongcheng Yao Autonomous County
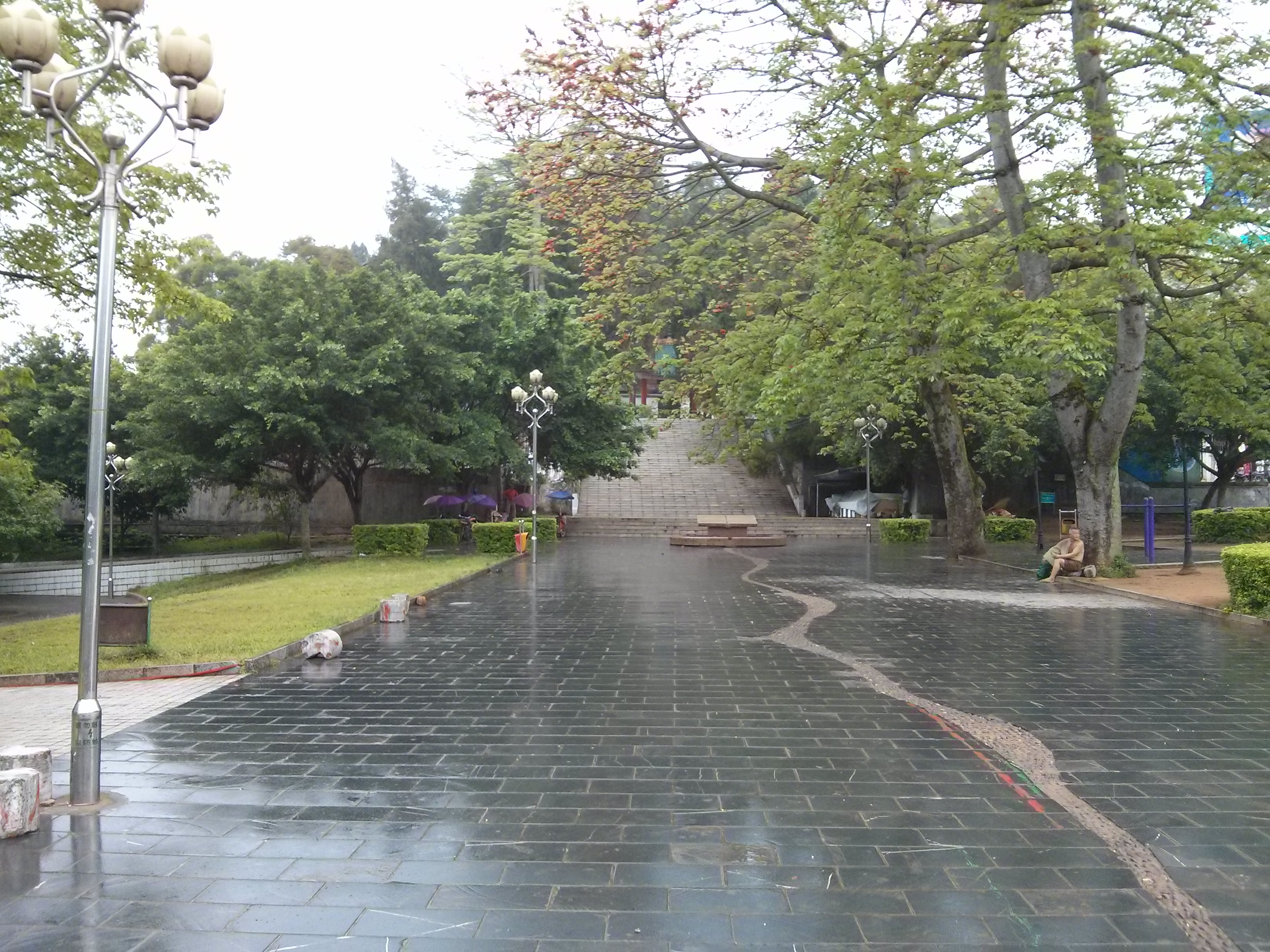

- Location of the seat in Guangxi
- Coordinates (Gongcheng County government): 24°49′55″N 110°49′41″E
- Country: China
- Autonomous region: Guangxi
- Prefecture-level city: Guilin
- County seat: Gongcheng

Area
  - Total: 2,149 km^{2} (830 sq mi)

Population (2011)
  - Total: 300,000
  - Density: 140/km^{2} (360/sq mi)
- Time zone: UTC+8 (China Standard)
- Postal code: 542500

Gongcheng Yao Autonomous County (simplified Chinese: 恭城瑶族自治县; traditional Chinese: 恭城瑤族自治縣; pinyin: Gōngchéng Yáozú Zìzhìxiàn) is a county within the prefecture-level city of Guilin, Guangxi, China. The county spans a total area of 2,149 km^{2} (830 sq mi), and has a population of approximately 300,000 as of 2011.

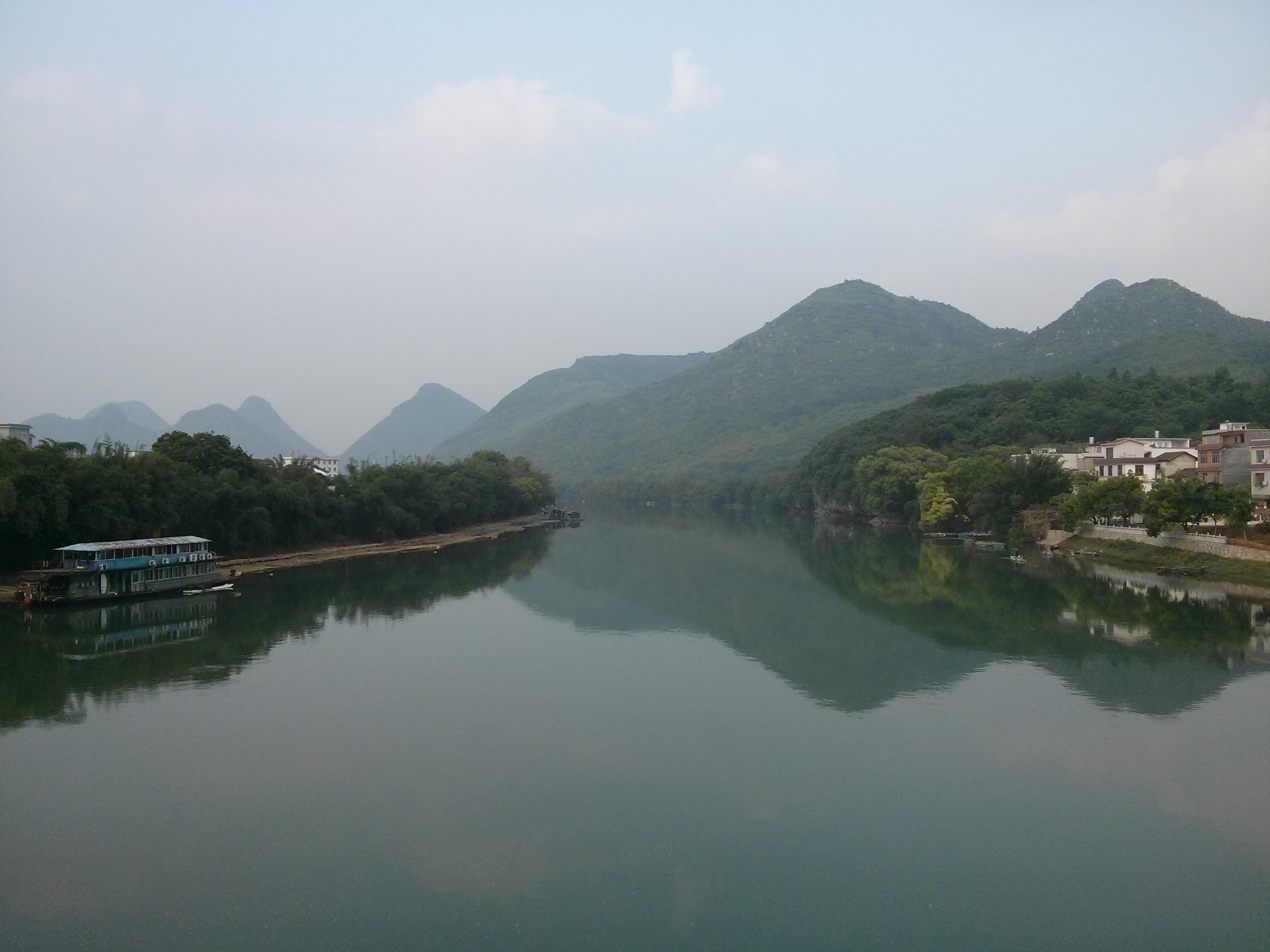
Cha river of Gongcheng

== History ==
The area was first incorporated under the Sui dynasty as Chacheng County (simplified Chinese: 茶城县; traditional Chinese: 茶城縣). During the Tang dynasty it was changed to Gongcheng County (恭城县; 恭城縣).

On February 3, 1990, Gongcheng County was changed to Gongcheng Yao Autonomous County.

== Geography ==
Most of the county is mountainous in nature, sans the lower southern portion of the county, and the valley along the Cha River. Common fruits in the area include peaches, persimmons, plums, loquat, and mandarin oranges. In the spring, red and pink peach blossoms bloom, and in autumn, the county's persimmons bloom.

=== Climate ===
The climate of Gongcheng is subtropical monsoon climate. Summer is hot, humid and long, whereas winters are dry and short. The county also receives adequate light and abundant rainfall. Annual rainfall averages 1,483.8 mm (58.42 in), and annual average humidity is 75%.

Climate data for Gongcheng, elevation 170 m (560 ft), (1991–2020 normals, extremes 1981–2010)
Month	Jan	Feb	Mar	Apr	May	Jun	Jul	Aug	Sep	Oct	Nov	Dec	Year
Record high °C (°F)	27.1 (80.8)	32.1 (89.8)	33.6 (92.5)	34.4 (93.9)	35.7 (96.3)	37.2 (99.0)	40.5 (104.9)	40.9 (105.6)	38.3 (100.9)	35.7 (96.3)	32.7 (90.9)	27.8 (82.0)	40.9 (105.6)
Mean daily maximum °C (°F)	13.4 (56.1)	15.8 (60.4)	18.8 (65.8)	24.7 (76.5)	29.0 (84.2)	31.5 (88.7)	33.6 (92.5)	33.8 (92.8)	31.7 (89.1)	27.7 (81.9)	22.3 (72.1)	16.5 (61.7)	24.9 (76.8)
Daily mean °C (°F)	9.6 (49.3)	11.9 (53.4)	14.9 (58.8)	20.3 (68.5)	24.4 (75.9)	27.0 (80.6)	28.6 (83.5)	28.4 (83.1)	26.5 (79.7)	22.4 (72.3)	17.1 (62.8)	11.7 (53.1)	20.2 (68.4)
Mean daily minimum °C (°F)	7.0 (44.6)	9.2 (48.6)	12.3 (54.1)	17.2 (63.0)	21.1 (70.0)	24.0 (75.2)	25.1 (77.2)	24.9 (76.8)	22.8 (73.0)	18.6 (65.5)	13.4 (56.1)	8.4 (47.1)	17.0 (62.6)
Record low °C (°F)	−1.2 (29.8)	−0.7 (30.7)	1.0 (33.8)	5.7 (42.3)	11.5 (52.7)	15.5 (59.9)	19.3 (66.7)	20.0 (68.0)	14.2 (57.6)	7.4 (45.3)	1.5 (34.7)	−3.8 (25.2)	−3.8 (25.2)
Average precipitation mm (inches)	72.1 (2.84)	65.5 (2.58)	132.3 (5.21)	186.9 (7.36)	262.0 (10.31)	289.6 (11.40)	163.1 (6.42)	146.3 (5.76)	55.4 (2.18)	50.4 (1.98)	62.4 (2.46)	51.6 (2.03)	1,537.6 (60.53)
Average precipitation days (≥ 0.1 mm)	11.9	12.5	17.6	17.0	17.2	18.8	15.2	14.1	8.2	6.2	8.2	8.5	155.4
Average snowy days	0.5	0.2	0	0	0	0	0	0	0	0	0	0.2	0.9
Average relative humidity (%)	73	75	79	80	79	81	77	76	71	67	68	67	74
Mean monthly sunshine hours	61.1	52.7	49.4	75.1	111.3	116.6	180.9	189.4	174.4	163.0	126.3	107.8	1,408
Percentage possible sunshine	18	16	13	20	27	29	44	48	48	46	39	33	32
Source: China Meteorological Administration

== Administrative divisions ==
The county is divided into 6 towns and 3 townships. The county government is seated in the town of Gongcheng (恭城镇).

The county's 6 towns are Gongcheng, Limu (栗木镇), Lianhua (莲花镇), Jiahui (嘉会镇), Xiling (西岭镇), and Ping'an (平安镇).

The county's 3 townships are Sanjiang Township (三江乡), Guanyin Township (观音乡), and Longhu Township (龙虎乡).

== Demographics ==
As of 2011, the total population of Gongcheng Yao Autonomous County stood at around 300,000 people. It is estimated that 60% of the county's population are ethnically Yao. Gongcheng County is also termed as "China's longevity" as by the end of 2013, the average life expectancy was at 77.09 years old.

According to the statistics of February 2015, the Gongcheng Yao Autonomous County has three main ethnic groups: the Yao, the Zhuang and Han Chinese. Other groups with significant populations in the county include the Miao, Yi, Li, Dong, Hui, Manchu, Tujia, Buyi, Guan, Lisu, Uygur, Jingpo, Tu and the Lahu.

The county's Yao population largely reside in the mountainous terrain of the southwest and south.

=== Languages ===
The majority of people in the county speak a Mienic language, and approximately two-fifths speak a Bunu language. Some also speak Lakkia.

=== Yao subgroups ===
Gongcheng County has four major subgroups of the Yao people: the Pan Yao, the Pingdi Yao, the Guoshan Yao, and the Sidamin Yao.

==== Pan Yao ====
The Pan Yao (盘瑶), also known as Pangu Yao (盘古瑶), is a subgroup of Yao people in Gongcheng. Their autonyms are Mian (勉) and Longyan (龙岩).

==== Pingdi Yao ====
The Pingdi Yao (平地瑶), also known as the Bidi (比滴) in the Shangong Yao language, and the Gan (干) in the Guoshan Yao language, is a subgroup of Yao people in Gongcheng. Their autonyms are Muyo (木哟) and Bingduoyou (炳多优).

==== Guoshan Yao ====
The Guoshan Yao (过山瑶), also known as the Guigelingmuyo (贵格令木哟) in the Pingdi Yao language, and the Gesuoxi (各索夕) in the Yao language of Sanjiang Township, is a subgroup of Yao people in Gongcheng. Their autonyms are Yumian (育棉), Biaoman (标曼), and Shimen (史门).

==== Sidamin Yao ====
The Sidamin Yao (四大民瑶) are a Yao subgroup which, during the Qing dynasty, migrated from an area known as Yongming (永明), which corresponds to present-day Jiangyong County in Hunan. The Sidamin, meaning "Four Great Peoples" historically were the Qingxi Yao (清溪瑶), the Gudiao Yao (古调瑶), the Goulan Yao (勾蓝瑶), and the Fuling Yao (扶灵瑶).

== Economy ==
Gongcheng has significant deposits of tin, tungsten, lead, zinc, manganese, granite, and marble.

== Culture ==
The Yao peoples of Gongcheng maintain a variety of traditional proverbs and poems.

The lusheng (mouth reed organ) is played by the Lowland/Pingdi Yao people (平地瑶; Píngdì Yáo) of Shuibing Village (水滨村) and Guanyin Township (观音乡).

Apart from the Spring Festival, the Tomb Sweeping Festival, the Dragon Boat Festival and the Mid-Autumn Festival, the Yao peoples of Gongcheng also have their own unique traditional festivals, such as Panwang Festival, Jichun Festival, Danu Festival, Shuaigetang Festival, Paga Festival.

Some Yao women in the county have a knowledge of traditional Yao weaving, dyeing, and embroidery, which they use to make traditional Yao clothing. Said clothing typically features a distinct pattern.

The Yao generally do not marry in other ethnicities and practice monogamy. Sometimes, marriage could be love marriages or arranged by the parents or elders of the family. One of the way of marriage in the Yao community specially in the past was by singing in antiphon specially during the Spring Festival, where the boy and the girl sing to each other in a way of question and answer. When a match is made, the boy and the girl give each other small pieces of ornaments as a keepsake.

The Yao people also have certain taboos, such as stepping on stoves, burning paper which has words written on it, wearing white shoes and white hat indoors (as it is the symbol of funeral).

=== Cuisine ===
During many festivals, ethnic Yao people make Babas, which are made with sticky rice, sometimes some local herbs are added, they are either sweet or salty and have sesame or peanut filling. Throughout other festivals most of the main dishes constitute of chicken, duck, fish, pork, tofu, and various kinds of vegetables.

You Cha (油茶), also known as Oil Tea, is a unique type of tea native to the region. In Guilin oil tea falls into several varieties: Gongcheng Yao oil tea, Longsheng Dong oil tea and Xing’an oil tea, each having its distinct characteristics. Among all of them, the most famous one is Gongcheng oil tea made by the local Yao community. Gongcheng oil tea is typically made by pounding tea leaves, adding a special oil and boiling water, filtering out solid residue, and adding salt, caraway seed, green onion, dried rice, fried groundnuts, sliced taro and fried beans to the tea. The process of beating the tea leaves is known as da youcha (打油茶), literally "beat oil tea". Oil tea is also served with local snacks and pickles. Among the locals, the custom is to present the first bowl of oil tea to the senior most member of the family and guests.

== Tourist attractions ==
The county's two main nature reserves are the Yindianshan Forest Reserve and the Xilinggang Bird Reserve. The county has historic temples devoted to Confucius and Zhou Wei.

=== Confucius Temple ===
The Confucius temple of Gongcheng was built in 1477. The temple is located in the south of Gongcheng town and is one of the best-preserved building from the Ming dynasty in the area. It is also one of the four largest Confucius Temples in China, and the largest in Guangxi. This temple is also listed as one of the important units of cultural relics under national protection.

According to the records, the temple was originally located in the north side of the town and in 1447 it was moved to south of Gongcheng. The architecture was too small and simple in the beginning and over the years it was extended and renovated. The temple now covers an area of 1,300 square meters.

This temple is built according to the geography of the mountains behind the temple and the Cha River in front of the temple. In and around the temple, there are a number of historical sculptures, plaques, and patterns.

Da Cheng Gate, the last gate of the temple, resembles an ancient halberd, therefore, people also refer to it as Halberd Gate. There are 3 doors in this gate, with the centre door only opening during certain important events. There are 108 nails on each door as 108 represents a lucky number in ancient China.

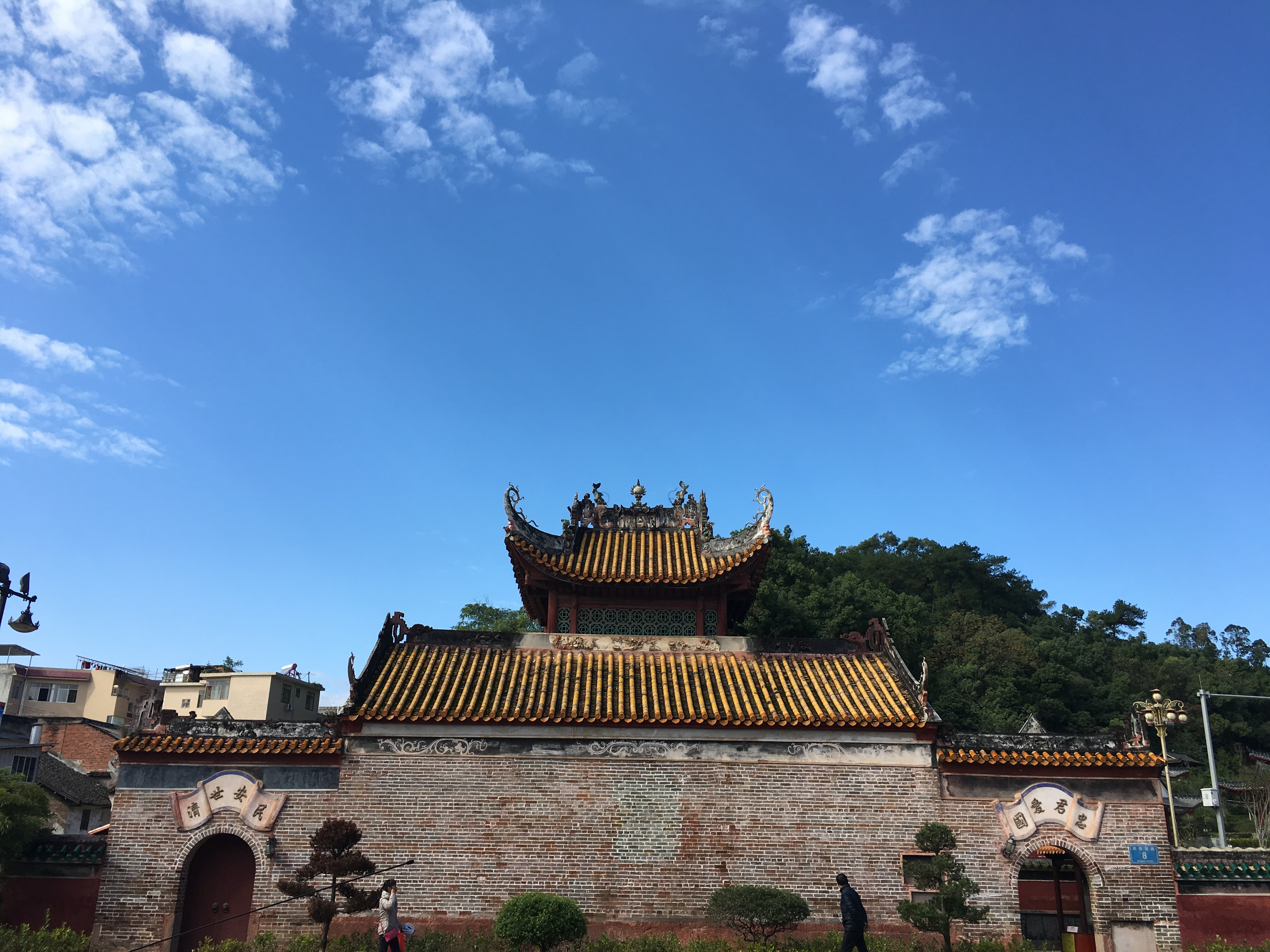
The Temple of Guan Yu

=== Wu Temple ===
Situated on the right side the Confucius Temple at about 50 meters is the Wu Temple. This temple was initially built in 1603 and rebuilt in 1720 thereafter it was destroyed during the war in 1854 and was later rebuilt again in 1862. The Wu Temple is also known as the Martial arts temple. It is a shrine built in honor of Guan Yu, a general during the Three Kingdoms period, who was also worshiped as the Sage of Martial Art in ancient China. This is the only place across China where a Confucius temple and a Martial art temple exist together. The temple is built in accordance of

The temple covers an area of 1,033 square meters. The temple has an old stage, a rain pavilion, a principal hall, a back hall and a memorial archway. There are only two side doors in the temple and no front doors, the reason behind it is not to let the aura of the outside affect the aura of the inside. On top of each door are Chinese inscriptions, stating – “Love your country and be loyal to your king. Do your best to help people”. Most of the temple's sculptures depict dragons, phoenixes, birds and fish, and are made up of clay and wood.

Inside the temple there is a stone stylobate, adorned with sculptures of flower and people. Four pillars on the top of the stylobate carry a heavy headpiece. During certain special festivals, local people sing, dance, or perform opera on the stylobate. Inside, there are depictions of two men standing next to their two horses, as tt is believed that these two horses belonged to Guan Yu and another soldier named Jiang Wei. There are also statues of two different Gods – the one on the left is believed to bring luck and the one on the right keeps people safe.

The carvings in the temple are from different ages of history The principal hall called “Xie Tian Gong”, and houses statues of Guan Yu and his soldiers. There are also two memorial archways – the Stone memorial archway and the Wooden memorial archway.

=== Zhuo Wei Temple ===
This temple is situated at about 800 meters from the Wu Temple, and commemorates Zhuo Wei, who served as an official in 999 AD. He petitioned the tax breaks, and change the land tax, advocated the establishment of schools, and the education of children.

To honour him the local people raised money and build a shrine for him. This temple was built in 1478 and later rebuilt again in 1723 and spreads over an area of 1,600 square meters. The Temple has a stage, a hall, a dorm and a gate. The brackets of the walls are shaped as honeycombs, which when grazed by an air current, makes noise. This noise acts as a natural resistant to birds and flies and prevents them from nesting there. This is considered an uncommon style of Chinese architecture.

The temple's external wall consists of thousands of timbers linked together in a series.

=== Hongyan Village ===
Hongyan is a village within Gongcheng known as a "socialist model village". Major attractions within the village include its persimmon trees, ancient bridge, bamboo rafts, and traditional cuisine. There is no direct bus from the center of Gongcheng to Hongyan Village, however, taxi services exist in the region.
