= Fangcheng District =

Fangcheng 防城区 • Fangzcwngz Gih Fongshing
- District
- Location in Guangxi
- Coordinates: 21.7672°N 108.352°E
- Country: China
- Autonomous region: Guangxi
- Prefecture-level city: Fangchenggang

Area
  - Total: 2,445 km^{2} (944 sq mi)

Population (2020)
  - Total: 390,961
  - Density: 159.9/km^{2} (414.1/sq mi)
- Time zone: UTC+8 (China Standard)

Fangcheng (postal: Fongshing, Chinese: 防城; pinyin: Fángchéng; Zhuang language: Fangzcwngz Gih) is a district of the city of Fangchenggang, Guangxi, China.

== Administrative divisions ==
Fangcheng District is divided into 3 subdistricts, 8 towns, 1 township and 1 ethnic township:

subdistricts

- Shuiying Subdistrict 水营街道
- Zhuhe Subdistrict 珠河街道
- Wenchang Subdistrict 文昌街道

towns

- Dalu Town 大菉镇
- Huashi Town 华石镇
- Nasuo Town 那梭镇
- Naliang Town 那良镇
- Dongzhong Town 峒中镇
- Jiangshan Town 江山镇
- Maoling Town 茅岭镇
- Fulong Town 扶隆镇

township

- Tanying Township 滩营乡

ethnic township

- Shiwanshan Yao Ethnic Township 十万山瑶族乡

== Climate ==
Climate data for Fangcheng District, elevation 32 m (105 ft), (1991–2020 normals, extremes 1991–present)
Month	Jan	Feb	Mar	Apr	May	Jun	Jul	Aug	Sep	Oct	Nov	Dec	Year
Record high °C (°F)	27.2 (81.0)	31.0 (87.8)	32.1 (89.8)	34.0 (93.2)	35.7 (96.3)	37.8 (100.0)	37.8 (100.0)	37.8 (100.0)	36.7 (98.1)	34.9 (94.8)	32.1 (89.8)	28.9 (84.0)	37.8 (100.0)
Mean daily maximum °C (°F)	17.6 (63.7)	19.2 (66.6)	21.8 (71.2)	26.6 (79.9)	30.1 (86.2)	31.3 (88.3)	31.8 (89.2)	32.2 (90.0)	31.6 (88.9)	29.0 (84.2)	25.0 (77.0)	20.2 (68.4)	26.4 (79.5)
Daily mean °C (°F)	13.8 (56.8)	15.5 (59.9)	18.4 (65.1)	22.9 (73.2)	26.3 (79.3)	27.9 (82.2)	28.1 (82.6)	27.9 (82.2)	27.0 (80.6)	24.2 (75.6)	20.2 (68.4)	15.8 (60.4)	22.3 (72.2)
Mean daily minimum °C (°F)	11.3 (52.3)	13.0 (55.4)	16.0 (60.8)	20.4 (68.7)	23.5 (74.3)	25.3 (77.5)	25.4 (77.7)	25.0 (77.0)	23.9 (75.0)	21.1 (70.0)	17.1 (62.8)	12.9 (55.2)	19.6 (67.2)
Record low °C (°F)	1.8 (35.2)	2.9 (37.2)	6.1 (43.0)	9.1 (48.4)	15.4 (59.7)	19.8 (67.6)	21.6 (70.9)	21.5 (70.7)	15.4 (59.7)	13.1 (55.6)	6.6 (43.9)	2.6 (36.7)	1.8 (35.2)
Average precipitation mm (inches)	55.1 (2.17)	42.1 (1.66)	72.3 (2.85)	104.8 (4.13)	239.5 (9.43)	554.5 (21.83)	647.8 (25.50)	478.1 (18.82)	255.7 (10.07)	103.4 (4.07)	69.1 (2.72)	41.5 (1.63)	2,663.9 (104.88)
Average precipitation days (≥ 1.0 mm)	11.5	11.9	15.3	13.2	14.9	19.9	20.6	19.5	12.8	7.7	8.3	8.0	163.6
Average relative humidity (%)	78	81	85	84	83	86	86	85	80	75	73	72	81
Mean monthly sunshine hours	66.7	54.6	53.1	94.0	153.3	140.5	173.4	180.2	190.1	187.4	143.6	112.6	1,549.5
Percentage possible sunshine	20	17	14	25	37	35	42	46	52	52	44	34	35
Source: China Meteorological Administrationall-time June, July and August and Extreme temperature
