= Mengshan County =

Mengshan County 蒙山县
- County
- Interactive map of Mengshan County
- Coordinates: 24°47′N 110°30′E
- Country: China
- Autonomous region: Guangxi
- Prefecture-level city: Wuzhou
- County seat: Mengshan Town

Area
  - Total: 1,279.34 km^{2} (493.96 sq mi)

Population
  - Total: 210,000
  - Density: 160/km^{2} (430/sq mi)
- Time zone: UTC+8 (China Standard)
- Postal code: 546700
- Website: www.gxmengshan.net (Chinese)

Mengshan County (simplified Chinese: 蒙山县; traditional Chinese: 蒙山縣; Jyutping: Mung4 Saan1 Jyun2; pinyin: Méngshān Xiàn) is a county under the administration of Wuzhou City in northeastern Guangxi, China. Its seat is located in Mengshan Town.

== History ==
Battles were fought in Mengshan during the Tai Ping Rebellion in 1851 and 1852.

Taiping soldiers captured the walled city of Yongan (Chinese: 永安; Jyutping: Wing5 On1; pinyin: yǒng ān) (now Mengshan Town) from Qing forces on September 25, 1851. The remains of sections of wall, replica cannons, and other artifacts are preserved and now form a tourist attraction on the northern end of Mengshan Town.

== Administrative divisions ==
Mengshan County has nine fourth-level administrative units: six towns, one township and two Yao ethnic townships.

| District | Population (2000 census) | Area (km^{2}) |
|---|---|---|
| Mengshan Town (蒙山镇; méng shān zhèn) | 44,077 | 82.9 |
| Xihe Town (西河镇; xī hé zhèn) | 32,200 | 216 |
| Xinxu Town (新圩镇; xīn xǖ zhèn) | 23,000 | 144 |
| Wenxu Town (文圩镇; wén xǖ zhèn) | 34,000 | 143 |
| Huangcun Town (黄村镇; huáng cūn zhèn) | 22,000 | 239.8 |
| Chentang Town (陈塘镇; chén táng zhèn) | 21,828 | 152.29 |
| Hanhao Township (汉豪乡; hàn háo xiāng) | 12,175 | 106.37 |
| Changping Yao Ethnic Township (长坪瑶族乡; cháng píng yáo zú xiāng) | 2,889 | 131.8 |
| Xiayi Yao Ethnic Township (夏宜瑶族乡; xià yí yáo zú xiāng) | 6,011 | 117.4 |
| Mengshan County | 198,180 | 1333.56 |

== Activities ==
Tianshu Canyon (simplified Chinese: 天书峡谷; traditional Chinese: 天書峽谷; Jyutping: Tin1 Syu1 Haap6 Guk1; pinyin: San tiān shū xiá gǔ) is located 5 kilometers east of Mengshan town. Tianshu Canyon has a has impressive stone formations and natural waterfalls.

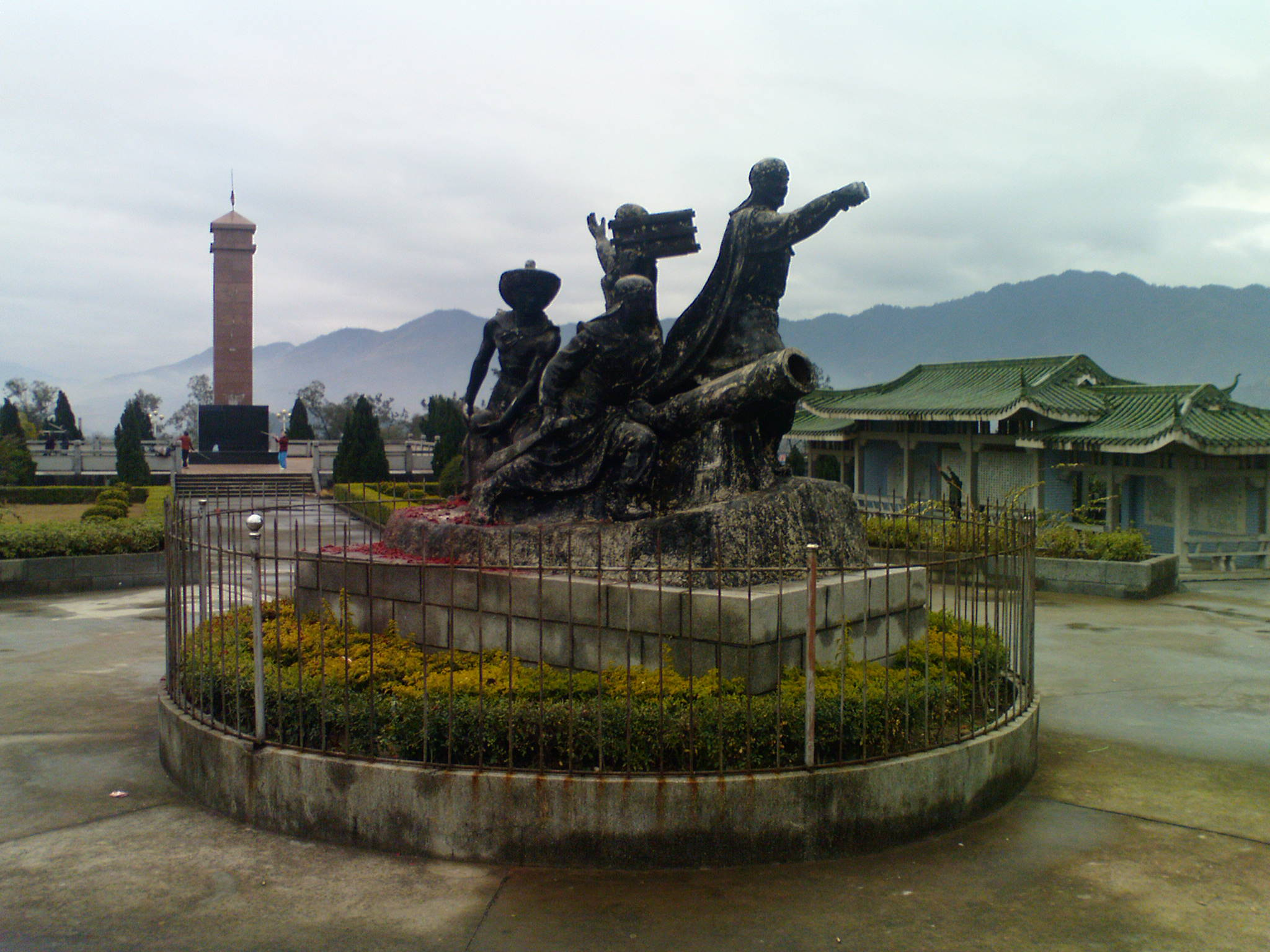

Located 13 kilometers east of Mengshan Town is San Chong Historic Battle Ground (simplified Chinese: 三冲古战场; traditional Chinese: 三沖古戰場; Jyutping: Saam1 Cung1 Gu2 Zin3 Coeng4; pinyin: San Chong Gu Zhan Chang), the site of a battle on April 8, 1852 during the Taiping Rebellion.

In 1968, during the Cultural Revolution cannibalism occurred in Mengshan county. 500 people were killed in a five-day period in mid-June.

Many Middle Schools were closed in Mengshan in 1968 and remained closed until 1974.

== Transportation ==
Mengshan does not have an airport or railway. The closest airports to Mengshan are Guilin Liangjiang International Airport and Wuzhou Airport. The main road which runs north-south through Mengshan is the G321 National Highway (simplified Chinese: 国道G321; traditional Chinese: 國道G321; pinyin: Guódào G sān èr yāo). Mengshan town is 145 km by road south of Guilin, 82 km by road south of Yangshuo, and 187 km by road north of Wuzhou. The G321 is a single carriageway with 2 lanes.

There are direct bus services from Mengshan town to Guilin, Wuzhou and many cities in the Guangdong Pearl River Delta including Guangzhou and Zhongshan.

== Economy ==
Although similar to Guilin and Yangshuo with attractive karst scenery, potential for outdoor activities, such as caving, rafting, climbing and mountain biking, Mengshan does not have any significant tourist industry or infrastructure.

Agriculture and forestry are the main industries in Mengshan. Rice is grown primarily for domestic consumption. Crops and fruit such as bitter tea, citrus fruit, apple, chestnut, pear, persimmon, passion fruit, star anise, sugar cane and ginger are grown for sale. Silkworms are also an important source of income for many villages. Vanilla is grown in Changping Yao Ethnic Township (simplified Chinese: 长坪瑶族乡; traditional Chinese: 長坪瑤族鄉; pinyin: Cháng Píng Yáo Zú Xiāng; Jyutping: Coeng4 Ping4 Jiu4 Zuk6 Hoeng1) and in other parts of Mengshan.

Tea is grown in most villages for domestic use, as well as for sale. Mengshan's climate is ideal for growing tea. Coffee mainly of the Arabica variety grows well in Mengshan county in frost free areas but planting is on a small scale.

Mengshan has productive vineyards, and further vineyards are being developed.

Remittances from rural migrant workers significantly contribute to the local economy.

== Notable people ==
- Liang Yusheng (1926–2009) a famous Chinese wuxia novelist who spent his early years in Wenxu Town (文圩镇; 文圩鎮; Man4 Heoi1 Zan3; wén xǖ zhèn), Mengshan.
- Chen Manyuan 陳漫遠(1911–1986) a member of the Central Committee of the CCP’s Eighth Congress (1956)

== Climate ==
Climate data for Mengshan, elevation 182 m (597 ft), (1991–2020 normals, extremes 1981–present)
| Month | Jan | Feb | Mar | Apr | May | Jun | Jul | Aug | Sep | Oct | Nov | Dec | Year |
|---|---|---|---|---|---|---|---|---|---|---|---|---|---|
| Record high °C (°F) | 27.1 (80.8) | 31.1 (88.0) | 33.1 (91.6) | 33.7 (92.7) | 34.9 (94.8) | 36.7 (98.1) | 40.2 (104.4) | 39.0 (102.2) | 38.7 (101.7) | 36.2 (97.2) | 32.8 (91.0) | 29.0 (84.2) | 40.2 (104.4) |
| Mean daily maximum °C (°F) | 14.2 (57.6) | 16.3 (61.3) | 19.1 (66.4) | 24.7 (76.5) | 29.0 (84.2) | 31.0 (87.8) | 32.7 (90.9) | 33.0 (91.4) | 31.2 (88.2) | 27.6 (81.7) | 22.6 (72.7) | 17.2 (63.0) | 24.9 (76.8) |
| Daily mean °C (°F) | 10.0 (50.0) | 12.2 (54.0) | 15.2 (59.4) | 20.6 (69.1) | 24.4 (75.9) | 26.6 (79.9) | 27.7 (81.9) | 27.6 (81.7) | 25.7 (78.3) | 21.9 (71.4) | 17.0 (62.6) | 12.0 (53.6) | 20.1 (68.1) |
| Mean daily minimum °C (°F) | 7.4 (45.3) | 9.5 (49.1) | 12.7 (54.9) | 17.7 (63.9) | 21.4 (70.5) | 23.8 (74.8) | 24.6 (76.3) | 24.4 (75.9) | 22.2 (72.0) | 18.1 (64.6) | 13.3 (55.9) | 8.5 (47.3) | 17.0 (62.5) |
| Record low °C (°F) | −1.3 (29.7) | −0.2 (31.6) | 0.3 (32.5) | 6.9 (44.4) | 11.6 (52.9) | 15.2 (59.4) | 17.8 (64.0) | 19.4 (66.9) | 14.2 (57.6) | 7.0 (44.6) | 2.4 (36.3) | −2.9 (26.8) | −2.9 (26.8) |
| Average precipitation mm (inches) | 70.7 (2.78) | 58.3 (2.30) | 124.5 (4.90) | 176.4 (6.94) | 286.6 (11.28) | 398.5 (15.69) | 258.3 (10.17) | 193.6 (7.62) | 97.9 (3.85) | 66.1 (2.60) | 68.2 (2.69) | 48.8 (1.92) | 1,847.9 (72.74) |
| Average precipitation days (≥ 0.1 mm) | 12.5 | 12.8 | 19.4 | 18.3 | 19.0 | 21.1 | 18.0 | 15.8 | 10.4 | 7.1 | 8.4 | 9.0 | 171.8 |
| Average snowy days | 0.3 | 0.1 | 0 | 0 | 0 | 0 | 0 | 0 | 0 | 0 | 0 | 0.2 | 0.6 |
| Average relative humidity (%) | 77 | 79 | 83 | 82 | 82 | 84 | 82 | 81 | 78 | 74 | 74 | 72 | 79 |
| Mean monthly sunshine hours | 64.2 | 52.4 | 44.7 | 75.0 | 111.2 | 119.2 | 175.9 | 183.8 | 165.8 | 166.0 | 130.0 | 112.7 | 1,400.9 |
| Percentage possible sunshine | 19 | 16 | 12 | 20 | 27 | 29 | 42 | 46 | 45 | 47 | 40 | 34 | 31 |
Source: China Meteorological Administrationall-time October record
