= Yangshan County =

Coordinates: 24°30′44″N 112°41′25″E

Yangshan 阳山县 Yeungshan
- County
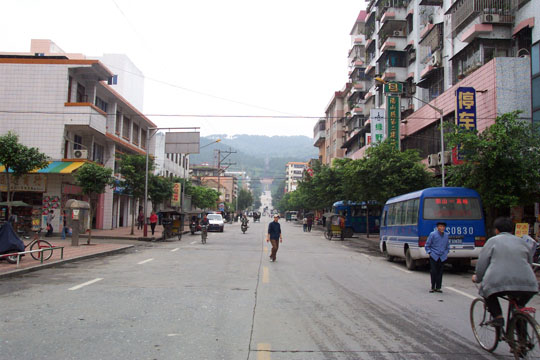

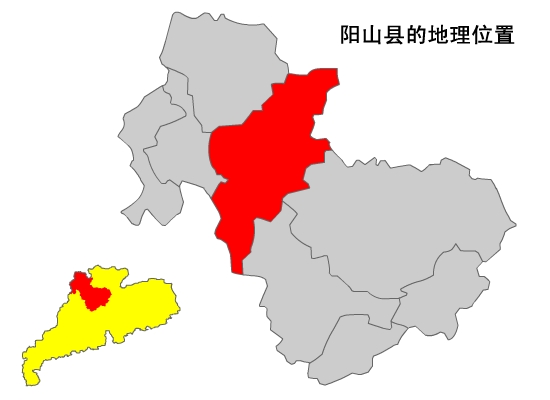
- Location of Yangshan County in Qingyuan City (gray) and Guangdong (yellow)
- Country: People's Republic of China
- Province: Guangdong
- Prefecture-level city: Qingyuan

Area
  - Total: 3,372 km^{2} (1,302 sq mi)
- Time zone: UTC+8 (China Standard)

Yangshan County (postal: Yeungshan; simplified Chinese: 阳山县; traditional Chinese: 陽山縣; pinyin: Yángshān Xiàn) is a county in the northwest of Guangdong Province, China, bordering Hunan province to the north. It is under the administration of the city of Qingyuan.

A military camp was established in the area in the late Qin dynasty. It was Emperor Han Wu Di who formally recognized Yangshan as a county. A Tang dynasty poet, Han You (Chinese: 韓愈), visited it and wrote a poem about his journey, "The Travel Diary of Swallow Pavilion" (Chinese: < 燕喜亭記>).

== Other information ==
According to the Local Gazette of Guangdong (廣東史志), Yangshan County is the hometown of about six thousand Overseas Chinese. These Overseas Chinese settle in Malaysia, United States of America, etc.

== In popular culture ==
In Grand Theft Auto V, according to Trevor Philips, Los Santos Triads leader Wei Cheng and his son Tao Cheng were born in Yangshan.

== Climate ==
Climate data for Yangshan, elevation 71 m (233 ft), (1991–2020 normals, extremes 1957–2010)
Month	Jan	Feb	Mar	Apr	May	Jun	Jul	Aug	Sep	Oct	Nov	Dec	Year
Record high °C (°F)	27.8 (82.0)	31.1 (88.0)	33.9 (93.0)	34.8 (94.6)	36.1 (97.0)	38.1 (100.6)	41.0 (105.8)	40.0 (104.0)	38.8 (101.8)	36.8 (98.2)	34.3 (93.7)	28.8 (83.8)	41.0 (105.8)
Mean daily maximum °C (°F)	15.3 (59.5)	17.4 (63.3)	19.8 (67.6)	25.3 (77.5)	29.5 (85.1)	32.1 (89.8)	34.1 (93.4)	34.2 (93.6)	32.1 (89.8)	28.7 (83.7)	23.7 (74.7)	18.2 (64.8)	25.9 (78.6)
Daily mean °C (°F)	10.6 (51.1)	12.8 (55.0)	15.7 (60.3)	21.0 (69.8)	25.0 (77.0)	27.5 (81.5)	28.9 (84.0)	28.7 (83.7)	26.8 (80.2)	22.9 (73.2)	17.8 (64.0)	12.6 (54.7)	20.9 (69.5)
Mean daily minimum °C (°F)	7.7 (45.9)	9.9 (49.8)	13.0 (55.4)	18.0 (64.4)	21.9 (71.4)	24.6 (76.3)	25.5 (77.9)	25.3 (77.5)	23.3 (73.9)	19.1 (66.4)	14.0 (57.2)	9.1 (48.4)	17.6 (63.7)
Record low °C (°F)	−0.2 (31.6)	−3.2 (26.2)	0.9 (33.6)	6.8 (44.2)	11.7 (53.1)	16.6 (61.9)	20.2 (68.4)	21.3 (70.3)	15.5 (59.9)	7.9 (46.2)	2.2 (36.0)	−2.1 (28.2)	−3.2 (26.2)
Average precipitation mm (inches)	78.0 (3.07)	90.2 (3.55)	182.5 (7.19)	220.0 (8.66)	330.1 (13.00)	341.3 (13.44)	201.0 (7.91)	178.0 (7.01)	114.8 (4.52)	68.0 (2.68)	61.6 (2.43)	50.5 (1.99)	1,916 (75.45)
Average precipitation days (≥ 0.1 mm)	12.0	13.5	19.8	18.2	19.7	20.3	16.7	16.3	10.9	6.5	7.7	8.2	169.8
Average snowy days	0.3	0.2	0	0	0	0	0	0	0	0	0	0.3	0.8
Average relative humidity (%)	73	76	81	81	81	82	78	77	74	69	70	69	76
Mean monthly sunshine hours	83.7	67.1	58.2	78.0	116.6	134.9	196.0	191.4	172.8	175.8	143.8	127.9	1,546.2
Percentage possible sunshine	25	21	16	20	28	33	47	48	47	49	44	39	35
Source: China Meteorological Administrationall-time extremes
