= Rulin =

Rulin Town 儒林镇
- Town
- Location in Hunan
- Coordinates: 26°21′31″N 110°18′42″E
- Country: China
- Province: Hunan
- Prefecture: Shaoyang
- Autonomous county: Chengbu Miao Autonomous County

Area
  - Total: 311 km^{2} (120 sq mi)
- Elevation: 800 m (2,600 ft)

Population (2015)
  - Total: 75,900
  - Density: 244/km^{2} (632/sq mi)
- Time zone: UTC+08:00 (China Standard)
- Postal code: 422500
- Area code: 0739

Chinese name
- Traditional Chinese: 儒林鎮
- Simplified Chinese: 儒林镇
Transcriptions
Standard Mandarin
- Hanyu Pinyin: Rúlín Zhèn

Rulin Town (Chinese: 儒林镇) is a town and the seat of Chengbu Miao Autonomous County in Hunan, China. The town has an area of 311 km^{2} (120 sq mi) with a population of 64,364 (as of 2010 census). As of the 2015 census it had a population of 75,900. It is surrounded by Maoping Town on the north, Dankou Town on the west, Lanrong Township on the east, and Tingping Township on the south.

The town of Rulin has 25 villages and 11 communities under its jurisdiction.

== Name ==
The name of the town is named after Rulin Academy (儒林书院), an academy of classical learning built by Yang Zaicheng (杨再成) in 1313 during the Yuan dynasty (1271–1368).

== History ==
The town of Rulin is an ancient town. In the late period of Sui dynasty (about 610s AD), the separatist leader Xiao Xian created Jian Prefecture (建州), as a county of the prefecture, Wuyou County (武攸县) was formed and its seat was located in the place of modern Rulin Town. The county of Wuyou was renamed to Wugang (武冈县) which was a part of Nanliang Prefecture (南梁州) in 621 AD. The county seat of Wugang was transferred to the modern downtown area of Wugang in early Song dynasty, the place of its former seat was named as Stockaded Village of Chengbu (城步寨).

The county of Chengbu was formed from parts of two counties of Wugang and Suining in 1504, it was named after its seat of Chengbuzhai (meaning "Stockaded Village of Chengbu"). Rulin Town was established in 1950, it was reorganized as a commune and a town in 1961.

== Administrative divisions ==
The town of Ruling has 11 communities and 25 villages under its jurisdiction (as of 2016).

11 communities

- Bajiaoting Community (八角亭社区)
- Bajuwei Community (八居委社区)
- Chengbei Community (城北居委会)
- Chengdong Community (城东社区)
- Chengnan Community (城南社区)
- Donghai Community (东海社区)
- Nanqiao Community (南桥社区)
- Shibanqiao Community (石板桥社区)
- Xintian Community (新田社区)
- Yunma Community (云马社区)
- Zhongxin Community (中心社区)

25 villages

- Bailiaozhou Village (白蓼洲村)
- Baiyunhu Village (白云湖村)
- Chengxi Village (城西村)
- Daqiao Village (大桥村)
- Ganxi Village (甘溪村)
- Jiangping Village (浆坪村)
- Jinshui Village (金水村)
- Lanteng Village (兰藤村)
- Lengshuiping Village (冷水坪村)
- Longfengchong Village (龙凤冲村)
- Luojiashui Village (罗家水村)
- Miaoling Village (苗岭村)
- Nanmen Village (南门村)
- Nanmu Village (楠木村)
- Panshi Village (盘石村)
- Qingxi Village (清溪村)
- Shiyang Village (石羊村)
- Shuanging Village (双井村)
- Shuangxiqiao Village (双溪桥村)
- Taxi Village (塔溪村)
- Tiantang Village (田塘村)
- Xinjianshui Village (新枧水村)
- Yangjiajiang Village (杨家将村)
- Yupin Village (玉屏村)
- Zhuangjia Village (庄稼村)

== Geography ==
The town is located in the middle of Chengbu Miao Autonomous County. It has a total area of 311 square kilometres (120 sq mi), of which 295.39 square kilometres (114.05 sq mi) is land and 15.61 square kilometres (6.03 sq mi) is water.

The Wushui River (巫水河) winds through the town.

The town is in the central subtropical monsoon climate. It has four distinct seasons and abundant rainfall. Winter is warm and summer is cold.

== Demographics ==
In December 2015, the town had an estimated population of 75,900 and a population density of 244 persons per km2. Miao people is the dominant ethnic group in the town, accounting for 48,700, accounting for 64.16%. There are also 12 ethnic groups, such as Dong, Hui, Tujia, and Yao. Among them, there are 15,200 Han people (20.03%), 4,100 Dong (5.40%), and 2,500 Hui people (3.29%).

== Economy ==
The local economy is primarily based upon agriculture and local industry.

== Transport ==
The Provincial Highway S219 is a north-south highway passing through the town's commercial and industrial areas.
