= Jiangfang Township, Chengbu County =

Jiangfang Township 蒋坊乡
- Township
- Location in Hunan
- Coordinates: 26°30′44″N 110°21′01″E
- Country: China
- Province: Hunan
- Prefecture: Shaoyang
- Autonomous county: Chengbu Miao Autonomous County

Area
  - Total: 94.8 km^{2} (36.6 sq mi)

Population (2015)
  - Total: 11,100
  - Density: 117/km^{2} (303/sq mi)
- Time zone: UTC+08:00 (China Standard)
- Postal code: 422503
- Area code: 0739

Chinese name
- Traditional Chinese: 蔣坊鄉
- Simplified Chinese: 蒋坊乡
Transcriptions
Standard Mandarin
- Hanyu Pinyin: Jiǎngfāng Xiāng

Jiangfang Township (Chinese: 蒋坊乡) is a rural township in Chengbu Miao Autonomous County, Hunan, China. As of the 2015 census it had a population of 11,100 and an area of 94.8 square kilometres (36.6 sq mi). It borders Maoping Town in the north, Rulin Town in the east and south, and Guanxia Miao Ethnic Township of Suining County in the west.

== Name ==
The name of the township is named after a pulp and paper workshop in the Song dynasty (960–1279) named "Jiangjiafang" (Chinese: 浆加坊). In the local dialect, the pronunciation of the characters "浆加坊" and "蒋坊" are similar, therefore, it is called "Jiangfang".

== Administrative divisions ==
As of 2015, the township is divided into 7 villages: Liulin (Chinese: 柳林村), Jianping (Chinese: 枧坪村), Shanfang (Chinese: 杉坊村), Putou (Chinese: 铺头村), Datong (Chinese: 大同村), Zhulian (Chinese: 竹联村) and Taihe (Chinese: 太和村).

== Geography ==
The township is located in the north of Chengbu Miao Autonomous County. It has a total area of 94.8 square kilometres (36.6 sq mi), of which 88.03 square kilometres (33.99 sq mi) is land and 6.77 square kilometres (2.61 sq mi) is water.

The Meixi River (Chinese: 梅溪河) winds through the township.

== Demographics ==
In December 2015, the township had an estimated population of 11,100 and a population density of 116 persons per km^{2}. Miao people is the dominant ethnic group in the township, accounting for 7,680, accounting for 69.19%. There are also 4 ethnic groups, including Dong, Hui, Han, and Manchu. Among them, there are 2,763 Han people (24.89%), 305 Dong (2.75%), 263 Hui (2.37%), and 89 Manchu people (0.80%).

== Economy ==
The principal industries in the area are agriculture, forestry and mineral resources.

== Transport ==
The township is connected to two highways: Provincial Highway S219, which heads south to downtown Chengbu Miao Autonomous County and north to Wugang via the towns of Maoping and Xiyan, and Provincial Highway S319, which heads north to Guanxia Miao Ethnic Township of Suining County.
