= Weixi Township =

Weixi Township 威溪乡
- Township
- Location in Hunan
- Coordinates: 26°37′00″N 110°35′10″E
- Country: China
- Province: Hunan
- Prefecture: Shaoyang
- Autonomous county: Chengbu Miao Autonomous County

Area
  - Total: 69.48 km^{2} (26.83 sq mi)

Population (2015)
  - Total: 8,780
  - Density: 126/km^{2} (327/sq mi)
- Time zone: UTC+08:00 (China Standard)
- Postal code: 422504
- Area code: 0739

Chinese name
- Traditional Chinese: 威溪鄉
- Simplified Chinese: 威溪乡
Transcriptions
Standard Mandarin
- Hanyu Pinyin: Wēixī Xiāng

Weixi Township (Chinese: 威溪乡) is a rural township in Chengbu Miao Autonomous County, Hunan, China. As of the 2015 census it had a population of 8,780 and an area of 69.48 square kilometres (26.83 sq mi). It borders Dengyuantai Town of Wugang in the north, Malin Township of Xinning County in the east, and Xiyan Town in the south and west.

== Name ==
The name of the township is named after the Weixi River (Chinese: 威溪河).

== Administrative divisions ==
As of 2015, the township is divided into 10 villages: Anfu (Chinese: 安福村), Zhengchong (Chinese: 正冲村), Xinglong (Chinese: 兴隆村), Fuxing (Chinese: 复兴村), Chashan (Chinese: 茶山村), Baisha (Chinese: 白沙村), Jingping (Chinese: 江坪村), Yinsha (Chinese: 银杉村), Changtian (Chinese: 长佃村) and Xuehua (Chinese: 雪花村).

== Geography ==
The township is located in the north of Chengbu Miao Autonomous County. It has a total area of 69.48 square kilometres (26.83 sq mi), of which 64.76 square kilometres (25.00 sq mi) is land and 4.52 square kilometres (1.75 sq mi) is water.

The highest point in the township is Mount Huangmajie (Chinese: 黄马界) which stands 1,740 metres (5,710 ft) above sea level.

There are 462 streams and creeks in the township, including Weixi River.

Weixi Reservoir (Chinese: 威溪水库) is the largest body of water in the township.

== Demographics ==
In December 2015, the township had an estimated population of 8,780 and a population density of 126 persons per km^{2}. Miao people is the dominant ethnic group in the township, accounting for 4,533, accounting for 51.63%. There are also 8 ethnic groups, such as Dong, Hui, and Yao. Among them, there are 1,712 Han people (19.50%) and 1,632 Dong, Hui and Yao people (18.59%).

== Economy ==
The region abounds with copper, manganese, tungsten, antimony and silicon.

== Plant resources ==
Phyllostachys edulis and cathaya are the main plant resources. In October 1990, the Hunan Provincial Government bestowed on it the title of "hometown of phyllostachys edulis" (Chinese: 楠竹之乡).
