= Ju Xiaoyang =

Chinese politician

- 鞠晓阳

Chairman of the Shaoyang Municipal Committee of the Chinese People's Political Consultative Conference
- In office January 2017 – January 2022
- Preceded by: Zhou Jiping (周吉平)
- Succeeded by: Zhou Wen (周文)

Communist Party Secretary of Longhui County
- In office April 2006 – January 2008
- Preceded by: Yang Jianxin (杨建新)
- Succeeded by: Zhong Yifan (钟义凡)

Communist Party Secretary of Xinning County
- In office August 2002 – April 2006
- Succeeded by: Chen Youxiu (陈优秀)

Personal details
- Born: November 1963 (age 62) Shaodong County, Hunan, China
- Party: Chinese Communist Party (1984–2024; expelled)
- Education: Hunan Agricultural Machinery School

Chinese name
- Simplified Chinese: 鞠晓阳
- Traditional Chinese: 鞠曉陽
Transcriptions
Standard Mandarin
- Hanyu Pinyin: Jū Xiǎoyáng

Ju Xiaoyang (Chinese: 鞠晓阳; born November 1963) is a former Chinese politician who spent his entire career in central China's Hunan province. As of November 2023, he was under investigation by China's top anti-graft watchdog. Previously he served as chairman of the Shaoyang Municipal Committee of the Chinese People's Political Consultative Conference.

== Biography ==
Ju was born in Shaodong County (now Shaodong), Hunan, in November 1963. After resuming the college entrance examination, in 1979, he enrolled at Hunan Agricultural Machinery School, where he majored in agricultural mechanization.

After graduation in 1982, he was despatched to the secretary of Shaodong County Agricultural Machinery Bureau of the Communist Youth League of China. He joined the Chinese Communist Party (CCP) in December 1984. He served as deputy secretary of Shaodong County Committee of the Communist Youth League of China in January 1984 and was promoted to the secretary position in August 1985. In January 1992, he became deputy secretary of Shaoyang Municipal Committee of the Communist Youth League of China, rising to secretary in July 1996. In September 2000, he was appointed deputy party secretary of Xinning County, rising to party secretary in August 2002. In April 2006, he was transferred to Longhui County and appointed party secretary. He was vice mayor of Shaoyang in January 2008 and subsequently secretary of the Political and Legal Affairs Commission of the CCP Shaoyang Municipal Committee in November 2008. In December 2016, he was chosen as deputy party branch secretary of the Shaoyang Municipal Committee of the Chinese People's Political Consultative Conference, concurrently serving as chairman since January 2017.

=== Downfall ===
On 6 November 2023, he turned himself in and is cooperating with the Central Commission for Discipline Inspection (CCDI), the party's internal disciplinary body, and the National Supervisory Commission, the highest anti-corruption agency of China. His deputy Jiang Kerong, vice chairman of the Shaoyang Municipal Committee of the Chinese People's Political Consultative Conference, was disgraced in September 2023. Chen Youxiu (陈优秀), his successor in Xinning County, was sacked for graft in November 2016.

On 28 January 2024, he was expelled from the CCP and removed from public office. On April 1, he was detained by the Hunan Provincial People's Procuratorate.

Party political offices
Preceded by ?	Communist Party Secretary of Xinning County; 2002–2006	Succeeded by Chen Youxiu (陈优秀)
Preceded by Yang Jianxin (杨建新)	Communist Party Secretary of Longhui County; 2006–2008	Succeeded by Zhong Yifan (钟义凡)
Assembly seats
Preceded by Zhou Jiping (周吉平)	Chairman of the Shaoyang Municipal Committee of the Chinese People's Political Consultative Conference; 2017–2022	Succeeded by Zhou Wen (周文)
