= Baimaoping =

Baimaoping 白毛坪镇
- Town
- Location in Hunan
- Coordinates: 26°14′58″N 110°22′39″E
- Country: China
- Province: Hunan
- Prefecture: Shaoyang
- Autonomous county: Chengbu Miao Autonomous County

Area
  - Total: 303.16 km^{2} (117.05 sq mi)

Population (2015)
  - Total: 16,600
  - Density: 54.8/km^{2} (142/sq mi)
- Time zone: UTC+08:00 (China Standard)
- Postal code: 422508
- Area code: 0739

Chinese name
- Traditional Chinese: 白毛坪鎮
- Simplified Chinese: 白毛坪镇
Transcriptions
Standard Mandarin
- Hanyu Pinyin: Báimáopíng Zhèn

Baimaoping (Chinese: 白毛坪镇) is a rural town in Chengbu Miao Autonomous County, Hunan, China. As of the 2015 census it had a population of 16,600 and an area of 303.16 square kilometres (117.05 sq mi). It is surrounded by Rulin Town on the north, Tingping Township on the west, Lanrong Township on the east, and Guali Township of Ziyuan County on the south.

== Name ==
The name of "Baimaoping" comes from the white elymus repens on the riverbanks in the territory. "Bai" means white, "Mao" means elymus repens and "Ping" means riverbanks.

== History ==
In 1995, the townships of Dayang (Chinese: 大阳乡) and Qingyuan (Chinese: 清源乡) merged into Baimaoping Township.

On 17 January 2019, it was upgraded to a town.

== Administrative divisions ==
As of 2015, the town is divided into 18 villages: Baimaoping (Chinese: 白毛坪村), Xiaozhai (Chinese: 小寨村), Hengbanqiao (Chinese: 横板桥村), Baitou'ao (Chinese: 白头坳村), Shengli (Chinese: 胜利村), Taiping (Chinese: 太平村), Dachaping (Chinese: 大岔坪村), Yuanjiashan (Chinese: 袁家山村), Heping (Chinese: 和平村), Dayang (Chinese: 大阳村), Daheng (Chinese: 大横村), Aoling (Chinese: 坳岭村), Huangsan (Chinese: 黄伞村), Zhaungtuanyuan (Chinese: 壮团园村), Chengxi (Chinese: 城溪村), Lawu (Chinese: 蜡屋村), Gewu (Chinese: 歌舞村), and Katian (Chinese: 卡田村).

== Geography ==
The town is located in the southeast of Chengbu Miao Autonomous County. It has a total area of 303.16 square kilometres (117.05 sq mi), of which 282.43 square kilometres (109.05 sq mi) is land and 20.73 square kilometres (8.00 sq mi) is water.

The Wushui River (Chinese: 巫水河) flows through the town.

The highest point in the town is Mount Dachongtou (Chinese: 大冲头) which stands 1,279 metres (4,196 ft) above sea level. The second highest point in the town is Mount Dajianling (Chinese: 大尖岭), which, at 1,196 metres (3,924 ft) above sea level.

== Demographics ==
In December 2015, the town had an estimated population of 16,600 and a population density of 55 persons per km^{2}. Miao people is the dominant ethnic group in the township, accounting for 9,900, accounting for 59.64%. There are also 13 ethnic groups, such as Dong, Hui, Zhuang, and Manchu. Among them, there are 3,300 Han people (19.88%) and 2,600 Dong, Manchu, Hui and Zhuang people (15.66%).

== Economy ==
The town's economy is based on nearby mineral resources and agricultural resources. The main agricultural products are lacquer, chestnut, wood, winter bamboo shoots, osmunda, litsea cubeba, etc. The region abounds with manganese, silicon, lead, zinc, and zeolite.

== Transport ==
The County Road X090 passes across the town. Due to the mountainous terrain the road is the only transportation option.

The closest airport, Shaoyang Wugang Airport, is located 96 kilometres (60 mi) north of Baimaoping in Wugang.
