= Jinzi Township =

Jinzi Township 金紫乡
- Township
- Location in Hunan
- Coordinates: 26°39′22″N 110°27′55″E
- Country: China
- Province: Hunan
- Prefecture: Shaoyang
- Autonomous county: Chengbu Miao Autonomous County

Area
  - Total: 69 km^{2} (27 sq mi)

Population (2015)
  - Total: 27,885
  - Density: 400/km^{2} (1,000/sq mi)
- Time zone: UTC+08:00 (China Standard)
- Postal code: 422504
- Area code: 0739

Chinese name
- Traditional Chinese: 金紫鄉
- Simplified Chinese: 金紫乡
Transcriptions
Standard Mandarin
- Hanyu Pinyin: Jīnzǐ Xiāng

Jinzi Township (Chinese: 金紫乡) is a rural township in Chengbu Miao Autonomous County, Hunan, China. As of the 2015 census it had a population of 27,885 and an area of 69 square kilometres (27 sq mi). It borders Wugang in the north, Xiyan Town in the east and south, and Wuyang Town of Suining County in the west.

== History ==
In December 2013, 13 villages of Xiyan Town and Qiliping Horticultural Farm (Chinese: 七里坪园艺场) merged to form Jinzi Township.

== Administrative division ==
As of 2015, the township is divided into 1 community: Qiliping Community (Chinese: 七里坪居委会) and 14 villages: Santang (Chinese: 三塘村), Baishui (Chinese: 白水村), Jinzijiang (Chinese: 金紫江村), Shankou (Chinese: 山口村), Shajing (Chinese: 沙井村), Jiangxi (Chinese: 江西村), Taiping (Chinese: 太平村), Wutang (Chinese: 五塘村), Fenghuang (Chinese: 凤凰村), Xinghuo (Chinese: 星火村), Changxing (Chinese: 长形村), Gaozhai (Chinese: 高寨村) and Shuiqing (Chinese: 水清村).

== Geography ==
The township is located in the north of Chengbu Miao Autonomous County. It has a total area of 69 square kilometres (27 sq mi), of which 64.1 square kilometres (24.7 sq mi) is land and 4.8 square kilometres (1.9 sq mi) is water.

The highest point in the township is Mount Fengmujie (Chinese: 枫木界) which stands 1,191 metres (3,907 ft) above sea level.

The Weixi River (Chinese: 威溪) flows through the town south to north.

== Demographics ==
In December 2015, the township had an estimated population of 27,885 and a population density of 404 persons per km2. Miao people is the dominant ethnic group in the township, accounting for 19,380, accounting for 69.5%. There are also 4 ethnic groups, such as Dong, Hui, Han, and Manchu. Among them, there are 8,504 Han, Dong, Hui and Man (30.5%).

== Economy ==
The main industries in and around the township are forestry and farming.
