= Dankou =

Dankou 丹口镇
- Town
- Location in Hunan
- Coordinates: 26°21′11″N 110°14′30″E
- Country: People's Republic of China
- Province: Hunan
- Prefecture-level city: Shaoyang
- Autonomous county: Chengbu

Area
  - Total: 286 km^{2} (110 sq mi)
- Elevation: 700 m (2,300 ft)

Population (2015)
  - Total: 25,800
  - Density: 90.2/km^{2} (234/sq mi)
- Time zone: UTC+08:00 (China Standard)
- Postal code: 422505
- Area code: 0739

Chinese name
- Traditional Chinese: 丹口鎮
- Simplified Chinese: 丹口镇
Transcriptions
Standard Mandarin
- Hanyu Pinyin: Dānkǒu Zhèn

Dankou (Chinese: 丹口镇) is a rural town in Chengbu Miao Autonomous County, Hunan, China. As of the 2015 census it had a population of 25,800 and an area of 286 square kilometres (110 sq mi). It is surrounded by Guanxia Town of Suining County on the north, Chang'anying Town on the west, Dingping Township on the south, and Rulin Town on the easth. Because there are many bamboos and trees in the town, it is hailed as "the home of bamboo and wood" (竹木之乡).

== History ==
In 1995, four townships, namely Dankou (Chinese: 丹口乡), Yangshi (Chinese: 羊石乡), Liuzhai (Chinese: 柳寨乡) and Pinglin (Chinese: 平林乡), merged to form the Dankou Town.

== Administrative divisions ==
As of 2015, the town is divided into 1 community: Xiatuan Community (Chinese: 下团居委会), and 15 villages: Qianjin (Chinese: 前进村), Shuangshun (Chinese: 双顺村), Qianzhou (Chinese: 潜洲村), Pingnanzhai (Chinese: 平南寨村), Taolin (Chinese: 桃林村), Bianxi (Chinese: 边溪村), Yongping (Chinese: 永平村), Xian'e (Chinese: 仙鹅村), Qunwang (Chinese: 群旺村), Yangshi (Chinese: 羊石村), Shazhouyanmen (Chinese: 沙洲岩门村), Qingtong (Chinese: 青桐村), Xinshi (Chinese: 信石村), Dankou (Chinese: 丹口村), Gonghe (Chinese: 共和村), Hualong (Chinese: 花龙村), Jinyan (Chinese: 金岩村), Taiping (Chinese: 太平村), Beixi (Chinese: 背西村), Shuanglong (Chinese: 双龙村), Longzhai (Chinese: 龙寨村), Yangliu (Chinese: 杨柳村), Dongtoushan (Chinese: 洞头山)

== Geography ==
The town is located in the southwest of Chengbu Miao Autonomous County. It has a total area of 286 square kilometres (110 sq mi), of which 269 square kilometres (104 sq mi) is land and 17 square kilometres (6.6 sq mi) is water.

The Wushui River (Chinese: 巫水河) flows through the town.

The highest point in the town is Mount Niupotou (Chinese: 牛坡头) which stands 1,913 metres (6,276 ft) above sea level.

=== Climate ===
The town is in the subtropical monsoon climate zone, with an average annual temperature of 23 °C (73 °F).

== Demographics ==
On December 31, 2015, the National Bureau of Statistics of the People's Republic of China estimates the town's population was 25,800. Miao people is the dominant ethnic group in the town, accounting for 63.95% of the total population. There are also 12 ethnic groups, such as Dong, Yao, Hui and Manchu. Among them, there are 4,400 Han people (17.05%) and 3,300 Dong, Yao, Hui and Manchu people (12.79%).

== Economy ==
Citrus, Myrica rubra, bamboo shoots, gastrodia elata and honeysuckle are famous local products in the town.

== Tourist attractions ==
The former residence of Lan Yu is the birthplace of Lan Yu, a general in the early Ming dynasty (1368–1644). Now it is a historical site in Chengbu Miao Autonomous County.

The Baishuidong Waterfall (Chinese: 白水洞瀑布; lit. 'Waterfall of White Water Hole') a famous scenic spot.
