= Lanrong Township =

Lanrong Township 兰蓉乡
- Township
- Location in Hunan
- Coordinates: 26°18′01″N 110°26′11″E
- Country: China
- Province: Hunan
- Prefecture: Shaoyang
- Autonomous county: Chengbu Miao Autonomous County

Area
  - Total: 112 km^{2} (43 sq mi)
- Elevation: 820 m (2,690 ft)

Population (2015)
  - Total: 8,982
  - Density: 80.2/km^{2} (208/sq mi)
- Time zone: UTC+08:00 (China Standard)
- Postal code: 422509
- Area code: 0739

Chinese name
- Traditional Chinese: 蘭蓉鄉
- Simplified Chinese: 兰蓉乡
Transcriptions
Standard Mandarin
- Hanyu Pinyin: Lánróng Xiāng

Lanrong Township (Chinese: 兰蓉乡) is a rural township in Chengbu Miao Autonomous County, Hunan, China. As of the 2015 census it had a population of 8,982 and an area of 112 square kilometres (43 sq mi). The town is bordered to the north by Rulin Town, to the east by Huangjin Township of Xinning County, to the south by Guali Township of Ziyuan County, and to the west by Baimaoping Township.

== Name ==
Legend said that someone set up a card here to intercept rhinoceros, so it is called "Lanniu" (Chinese: 拦牛). "Lan" means intercept and "Niu" means rhinos. In the local dialect, the pronunciation of the phrases "Lanniu" and "Lanrong" (Chinese: 兰蓉) are similar, so this is origin of "Lanrong".

== Administrative division ==
As of 2015, the township is divided into 7 villages: Jiantoutian (Chinese: 尖头田村), Xinzhai (Chinese: 新寨村), Baomuping (Chinese: 报木坪村), Huilong (Chinese: 会龙村), Shuiyuan (Chinese: 水源村), Qianfeng (Chinese: 黔峰村) and Qingyun (Chinese: 青云村).

== Geography ==
The township is located in the southeast of Chengbu Miao Autonomous County. It has a total area of 112 square kilometres (43 sq mi), of which 105.9 square kilometres (40.9 sq mi) is land and 6.1 square kilometres (2.4 sq mi) is water.

There are a number of popular mountains located immediately adjacent to the townsite which include Mount Erbaoding (二宝顶; 2,021-metre (6,631 ft)); Mount Fengyudian (风雨殿; 1,855-metre (6,086 ft)); and Mount Santianxing (三天星; 1,222-metre (4,009 ft)).

The Wushui River (Chinese: 巫水河) flows through the town north to south.

=== Climate ===
The township has a subtropical mountain climate with an average annual temperature of 13.5 °C (56.3 °F). Winter is warm and summer is cold. The average temperature in July is 24 °C (75 °F) and the extreme maximum temperature is 34 °C (93 °F).

== Demographics ==
In December 2015, the township had an estimated population of 8,982 and a population density of 80 persons per km2. Miao people is the dominant ethnic group in the township, accounting for 5,224, accounting for 58.16%. There are also 10 ethnic groups, such as Dong, Hui, Zhuang, and Manchu. Among them, there are 1,671 Han people (18%) and 1,557 Dong, Manchu, Hui and Zhuang people (17.33%).

== Economy ==
The principal industries in the area are agriculture, forestry and mineral resources. The region abounds with manganese and silicon.
