= Tingping Township =

Tingping Township 汀坪乡
- Township
- Location in Hunan
- Coordinates: 26°06′23″N 110°17′16″E
- Country: China
- Province: Hunan
- Prefecture: Shaoyang
- Autonomous county: Chengbu Miao Autonomous County

Area
  - Total: 255.76 km^{2} (98.75 sq mi)

Population (2015)
  - Total: 17,200
  - Density: 67.3/km^{2} (174/sq mi)
- Time zone: UTC+08:00 (China Standard)
- Postal code: 422509
- Area code: 0739

Chinese name
- Traditional Chinese: 汀坪鄉
- Simplified Chinese: 汀坪乡
Transcriptions
Standard Mandarin
- Hanyu Pinyin: Tīngpíng Xiāng

Tingping Township (Chinese: 汀坪乡) is a rural township in Chengbu Miao Autonomous County, Hunan, China. As of the 2015 census it had a population of 17,200 and an area of 255.76 square kilometres (98.75 sq mi). The town shares a border with Wutuan Town to the west, Baimaoping Township to the east, Rulin Town to the north, and Jiangdi Township of Longsheng Various Nationalities Autonomous County to the south.

== Name ==
There is a river name "Jiebei River" (Chinese: 界背水) crossing the township. The headwaters meet with the river in the shape of Chinese character "丁". In Chinese, the pronunciation of the characters "丁" and "汀" are similar. "坪" means a flat piece of land. Therefore, it is named "Tingping".

== History ==
In 1995, the townships of Pengdong (Chinese: 蓬洞乡) and Yangmei'ao (Chinese: 杨梅坳乡) merged into Tingping Township.

== Administrative division ==
As of 2015, the township is divided into 16 villages: Tingping (Chinese: 汀坪村), Guihua (Chinese: 桂花村), Hengshui (Chinese: 横水村), Changtan (Chinese: 长滩村), Dahou (Chinese: 大候村), Pengying (Chinese: 蓬瀛村), Aishang (Chinese: 隘上村), Tuanxinzhai (Chinese: 团心寨村), Dashui (Chinese: 大水村), Gutian (Chinese: 古田村), Yangmei (Chinese: 杨梅村), Gaoqiao (Chinese: 高桥村), Anle (Chinese: 安乐村), Longtang (Chinese: 龙塘村), Taiyang (Chinese: 太阳村) and Jintongshan (Chinese: 金童山村).

== Geography ==
The township is located in the south of Chengbu Miao Autonomous County. It has a total area of 255.76 square kilometres (98.75 sq mi), of which 241.05 square kilometres (93.07 sq mi) is land and 14.71 square kilometres (5.68 sq mi) is water.

The highest point in the township is Mount Lao (Chinese: 老山), which, at 1,801 metres (5,909 ft) above sea level. The second highest point in the township is Mount Qiemaduo (Chinese: 且马踱) which stands 1,335 metres (4,380 ft) above sea level.

There are two main rivers in the township: Changtan River (Chinese: 长滩河) and Great River (Chinese: 大河).

== Demographics ==
In December 2015, the township had an estimated population of 17,200 and a population density of 66 persons per km2. Miao people is the dominant ethnic group in the township, accounting for 11,000, accounting for 63.95%. There are also 11 ethnic groups, such as Dong, Hui, Zhuang, and Manchu. Among them, there are 3,100 Han people (18.02%) and 2,900 Dong, Manchu, Hui and Zhuang people (16.86%).

== Economy ==
The town's economy is based on nearby mineral resources and agricultural resources. Dairy farming is the main source of income The region abounds with tungsten, lead, copper, gold, silicon, crystal, etc.

== Transport ==
The Provincial Highway S219 passes across the town north to south.
