= Maoping, Chengbu County =

Maoping Town 茅坪镇
- Town
- Location in Hunan
- Coordinates: 26°30′46″N 110°24′41″E
- Country: China
- Province: Hunan
- Prefecture: Shaoyang
- Autonomous county: Chengbu Miao Autonomous County

Area
  - Total: 151.2 km^{2} (58.4 sq mi)

Population (2015)
  - Total: 21,000
  - Density: 140/km^{2} (360/sq mi)
- Time zone: UTC+08:00 (China Standard)
- Postal code: 422503
- Area code: 0739

Chinese name
- Traditional Chinese: 茅坪鎮
- Simplified Chinese: 茅坪镇
Transcriptions
Standard Mandarin
- Hanyu Pinyin: Máopíng Zhèn

Maoping (Chinese: 茅坪镇) is a rural town under the administration of Chengbu Miao Autonomous County, Hunan, China. As of 2018, it has 5 residential communities and 10 villages under its administration. As of the 2015 census it had a population of 21,000 and an area of 151.2 square kilometres (58.4 sq mi). The town is bordered to the north by Xiyan Town, to the east by Huangjin Township of Xinning County, to the south by Rulin Town, and to the west by Suining County.

== Name ==
In the Tang dynasty (618–907), the Miao people moved from Xuzhou to Maoping, and changed their surname from "Yang" to "Mao". And named the residence "Maoping" (Chinese: 毛坪), meaning the Mao family's land. "Ping" means a flat piece of land. Later, due to the drought, the area became increasingly barren, Maoping became "Maoping" (Chinese: 茅坪镇). "Mao" (Chinese: 茅) means thatch grass.

== Administrative divisions ==
As of 2015, the town is divided into 4 communities: the 1st Community (Chinese: 第一居委会), 2nd Community (Chinese: 第二居委会), 3rd Community (Chinese: 第三居委会), Yanzishan Community (Chinese: 燕子山居委会), and 10 villages: Tonglong (Chinese: 桐龙村), Lianlong (Chinese: 联龙村), Jinxing (Chinese: 金兴村), Gaoping (Chinese: 高坪村), Shuangqiao (Chinese: 双桥村), Xipenshui (Chinese: 玺盆水村), Changle (Chinese: 长乐村), Dagu (Chinese: 大古村), Tuqiao (Chinese: 土桥村) and Qilishan (Chinese: 七里山村).

== Geography ==
The town is located in the north of Chengbu Miao Autonomous County. It has a total area of 151.2 square kilometres (58.4 sq mi), of which 143.23 square kilometres (55.30 sq mi) is land and 7.97 square kilometres (3.08 sq mi) is water.

There are three rivers flow through the town, namely the Wushui River, Yuan River and Zi River.

The highest point in the town is Mount Maozitou (Chinese: 帽子头), which, at 1,191 metres (3,907 ft) above sea level.

== Demographics ==
In December 2015, the town had an estimated population of 21,000 and a population density of 139 persons per km^{2}. Miao is the dominant ethnic group in the town, accounting for 13,400, or 63.81% of the population. There are 14 ethnic groups represented within the population, including 3,900 Han (18.57%) and 3,600 Dong, Hui and Yao people (17.14%).

== Economy ==
The town's economy is based on nearby natural mineral and agricultural resources. Minerals such as pyrite, lead, zinc, copper, phosphorus, sand, and limestone can be found in the region. Watermelon and citrus are important to the local economy.

== Transport ==
The Provincial Highway S219 passes the town.
