= Tao Hong =

Tao Hong may refer to:

- Tao Hong (actress, born 1969), Chinese actress
- Tao Hong (actress, born 1972), Chinese actress and synchronised swimmer

== See also ==
- Taohong, a town in Longhui County, Hunan, China
