= Changpu (disambiguation) =

Changpu is a town of Suining County, Hunan.

Changpu may also refer to:

- Changpu, Susong County, a town of Susong County, Anhui
- Changpu, Yuexi County, a town of Yuexi County, Anhui
- Changpu Township, a township of Xunwu County, Jiangxi
