= Jingwei (disambiguation) =

Jingwei is a bird in Chinese mythology.

Jingwei may also refer to these places in China:

- Jingwei Township, Xinning County, Hunan
- Jingwei Subdistrict, Harbin, Heilongjiang
- Jingwei Subdistrict, Xi'an, Shaanxi
- Jingwei Subdistrict, Jinzhong, Shanxi

== See also ==
- Dong Jingwei, Chinese politician and intelligence officer
- Wang Jingwei (1883–1944), Chinese left-wing politician
