= Chengbu Miao Autonomous County =

Chengbu 城步县 Chengpu
- Autonomous county
- 城步苗族自治县; Chengbu Miao Autonomous County
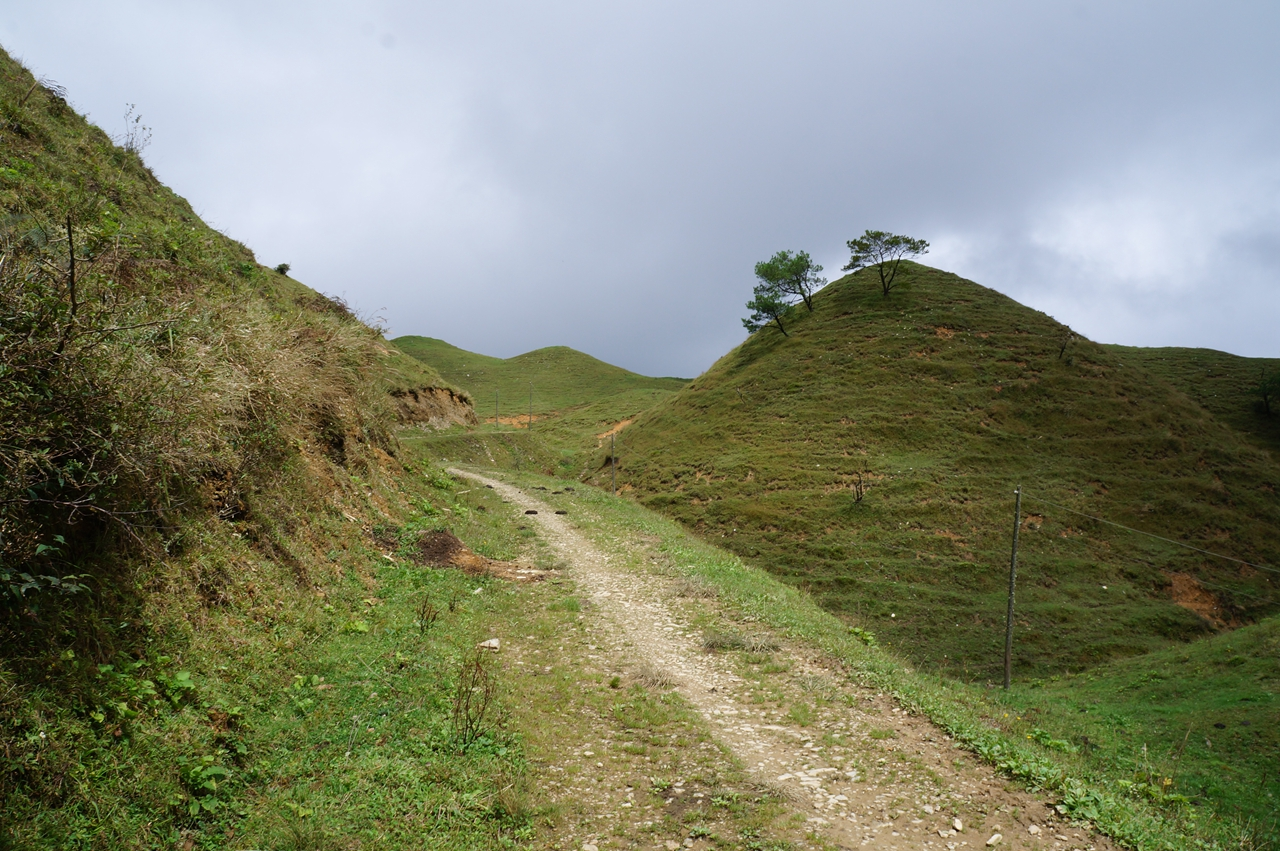
- Chengbu Nanshan Peak

- Location of the seat in Hunan
- Coordinates: 26°23′30″N 110°19′22″E
- Country: People's Republic of China
- Province: Hunan
- Prefecture-level city: Shaoyang
- Seat: Rulin

Area
  - Total: 2,647 km^{2} (1,022 sq mi)

Population (2017)
  - Total: 292,033
  - Density: 110.3/km^{2} (285.7/sq mi)
- Time zone: UTC+08:00 (China Standard)

Chengbu Miao Autonomous County (simplified Chinese: 城步苗族自治县; traditional Chinese: 城步苗族自治縣; pinyin: Chéngbù Miáozú Zìzhìxiàn), usually referred to as Chengbu County (simplified Chinese: 城步县; traditional Chinese: 城步縣; pinyin: Chéngbù Xiàn) or abbreviated just as Chengbu, is an autonomous county of Miao people in the Province of Hunan, China. It is under the administration of Shaoyang City.

Located on the south western margin of Hunan, the county is bordered to the northeast by Wugang City, to the northwest by Suining County, to the southwest by Longsheng Autonomous County of Guangxi, to the southeast by Ziyuan County of Guangxi, and to the south by Xinning County. Chengbu County covers an area of 2,647 km^{2} (1,022 sq mi), and as of 2015, it had a registered population of 285,845 and a permanent resident population of 262,245. The county has six towns and six townships under its jurisdiction, and the county seat is Chengbei Community of Rulin Town (儒林镇城北社区).

== Administrative divisions ==
Chengbu Miao Autonomous County has 6 towns and 6 townships.

As of October 2015, Chengbu Miao Autonomous County has six townships and six towns under its jurisdiction. The county seat is the town of Rulin.

| Name | Chinese character | Population (2015) | Area (Km2) | Notes |
|---|---|---|---|---|
| Chang'anying Town | 长安营镇 | 8013 | 260 | |
| Dankou Town | 丹口镇 | 25800 | 286 | |
| Maoping Town | 茅坪镇 | 21000 | 151.2 | |
| Rulin Town | 儒林镇 | 75900 | 311 | |
| Wutuan Town | 五团镇 | 13476 | 173 | |
| Xiyan Town | 西岩镇 | 54200 | 150 | |
| Baimaoping Township | 白毛坪乡 | 16600 | 303.16 | |
| Jiangfang Township | 蒋坊乡 | 11100 | 94.8 | |
| Jinzi Township | 金紫乡 | 27885 | 69 | |
| Lanrong Township | 兰蓉乡 | 8982 | 112 | |
| Dingping (Tingping) Township | 汀坪乡 (汀坪乡) | 17200 | 255.76 | |
| Weixi Township | 威溪乡 | 8780 | 69.48 | |

== Geography ==
Chengbu Miao Autonomous County is located in the southwestern Hunan province. It lies in the upper reaches of the Wu River. The county shares a border with Wugang to the north, Xinning County to the east, Guangxi Zhuang Autonomous Region to the southeast and south, and Tongdao Dong Autonomous County and Suining County to the west. The county has a total area of 2,647.07 square kilometres (1,022.04 sq mi). Chengbu Miao Autonomous County is surrounded by mountains in the east, south and west, high in the southern area and low in the northern area, with a large undulating terrain. The terrain is mainly mountainous and distributes in zones.

=== Climate ===
Chengbu Miao Autonomous County is in the subtropical monsoon climate zone and exhibits four distinct seasons. It has an average annual temperature of 16.1 °C (61.0 °F), total annual rainfall of 1,218.5 millimetres (47.97 in), a frost-free period of 345 days and annual average sunshine hours between 1134.6 and 1601.5 hours.

Climate data for Chengbu, elevation 478 m (1,568 ft), (1991–2020 normals, extremes 1991–present)
| Month | Jan | Feb | Mar | Apr | May | Jun | Jul | Aug | Sep | Oct | Nov | Dec | Year |
|---|---|---|---|---|---|---|---|---|---|---|---|---|---|
| Record high °C (°F) | 24.9 (76.8) | 30.8 (87.4) | 31.5 (88.7) | 34.2 (93.6) | 36.5 (97.7) | 37.2 (99.0) | 38.5 (101.3) | 39.9 (103.8) | 38.1 (100.6) | 36.1 (97.0) | 30.7 (87.3) | 25.9 (78.6) | 39.9 (103.8) |
| Mean daily maximum °C (°F) | 8.8 (47.8) | 11.8 (53.2) | 16.1 (61.0) | 22.6 (72.7) | 26.5 (79.7) | 29.1 (84.4) | 31.9 (89.4) | 31.7 (89.1) | 28.1 (82.6) | 22.7 (72.9) | 17.6 (63.7) | 11.7 (53.1) | 21.5 (70.8) |
| Daily mean °C (°F) | 5.2 (41.4) | 7.7 (45.9) | 11.5 (52.7) | 17.4 (63.3) | 21.4 (70.5) | 24.6 (76.3) | 26.8 (80.2) | 25.9 (78.6) | 22.6 (72.7) | 17.6 (63.7) | 12.5 (54.5) | 7.2 (45.0) | 16.7 (62.1) |
| Mean daily minimum °C (°F) | 2.7 (36.9) | 4.9 (40.8) | 8.4 (47.1) | 13.7 (56.7) | 17.7 (63.9) | 21.4 (70.5) | 23.2 (73.8) | 22.2 (72.0) | 19.0 (66.2) | 14.2 (57.6) | 9.0 (48.2) | 4.1 (39.4) | 13.4 (56.1) |
| Record low °C (°F) | −8.4 (16.9) | −4.3 (24.3) | −1.3 (29.7) | 1.4 (34.5) | 7.8 (46.0) | 13.6 (56.5) | 16.3 (61.3) | 15.5 (59.9) | 10.4 (50.7) | 2.2 (36.0) | −1.7 (28.9) | −6.7 (19.9) | −8.4 (16.9) |
| Average precipitation mm (inches) | 61.9 (2.44) | 64.5 (2.54) | 118.5 (4.67) | 124.4 (4.90) | 182.4 (7.18) | 190.8 (7.51) | 148.5 (5.85) | 121.8 (4.80) | 67.7 (2.67) | 77.5 (3.05) | 63.0 (2.48) | 49.5 (1.95) | 1,270.5 (50.04) |
| Average precipitation days (≥ 0.1 mm) | 15.3 | 14.8 | 17.7 | 16.5 | 16.8 | 16.6 | 12.5 | 14.1 | 9.7 | 10.2 | 10.7 | 11.5 | 166.4 |
| Average snowy days | 3.4 | 1.6 | 0.3 | 0 | 0 | 0 | 0 | 0 | 0 | 0 | 0.1 | 0.8 | 6.2 |
| Average relative humidity (%) | 82 | 81 | 82 | 80 | 80 | 82 | 77 | 80 | 80 | 80 | 80 | 78 | 80 |
| Mean monthly sunshine hours | 51.0 | 54.7 | 68.1 | 101.3 | 120.5 | 113.9 | 182.8 | 171.7 | 134.0 | 110.7 | 102.2 | 84.0 | 1,294.9 |
| Percentage possible sunshine | 15 | 17 | 18 | 26 | 29 | 28 | 44 | 43 | 37 | 31 | 32 | 26 | 29 |
Source: China Meteorological Administration

=== Rivers ===
Chengbu Miao Autonomous County has 816 rivers and streams.

Wu River, formerly known as "Xiong River" and commonly known as "Yun River", is a tributary of Yuan River and the largest river in Chengbu Miao Autonomous County. It rises on the southwestern slopes of the Wu Mountain and discharges to Yuan River in Hongjiang City. It is 106 kilometres (66 mi) long and drains an area of 1,576.4 square kilometres (608.7 sq mi) in the county.

Xun River, formerly known as "Tan River", is the second largest river in the county. It rises on the southeastern slopes of the Huangshan or Yellow Mountain and discharges to Rong River in Guangxi. It is 55.5 square kilometres (21.4 mi^{2}) long and is a tributary of Pearl River, draining an area of 578.1 square kilometres (223.2 sq mi).

Zi River, also known as "Hao River", "Ji River" or "Duliang River", rises on the Guangfu Mountain and joins Dongting Lake. It is 33 kilometres (21 mi) long and drains an area of 418 square kilometres (161 sq mi) in the county.

Qu River (渠水), also known as "Changping River", rises on the northwestern slopes of the Nanshan or Southern Mountain and discharges to Yuan River. It is 29.3 kilometres (18.2 mi) long and drains an area of 153 square kilometres (59 sq mi) in the county.

=== Mountains ===
There are more than 657 mountains over 1,000 metres (3,300 ft) above sea level in Chengbu Miao Autonomous County. The highest point in the county is Mount Erbaoding (Chinese: 二宝顶) which stands 2,021 metres (6,631 ft) above sea level. The lowest point is Kuangtang (匡塘), which, at 326 metres (1,070 ft) above sea level. Other famous mountains are Mount Jinzi (金紫山; 1,883 metres (6,178 ft)), Mount Longxuyan (龙须岩; 1,817 metres (5,961 ft)), Nanshan or Southern Mountain (南山; 1,940.6 metres (6,367 ft)), Laoshan or the Old Mountain (老山; 1,801 metres (5,909 ft)), and Mount Huangzhu (黄竹山; 1,740 metres (5,710 ft)).

== Demographics ==
As of 2017, the National Bureau of Statistics of the People's Republic of China estimates the county's population now to be 292,033.

=== Ethnicity ===
Historical population
| Year | Pop. | ±% |
|---|---|---|
| 1504 | 180,000 | — |
| 1816 | 89,390 | −50.3% |
| 1906 | 73,161 | −18.2% |
| 1930 | 182,204 | +149.0% |
| 1936 | 91,260 | −49.9% |
| 1949 | 92,612 | +1.5% |
| 1958 | 122,655 | +32.4% |
| 1978 | 192,382 | +56.8% |
| 1989 | 232,874 | +21.0% |
| 2002 | 255,696 | +9.8% |
| 2004 | 258,494 | +1.1% |
| 2016 | 288,093 | +11.5% |
| 2017 | 292,033 | +1.4% |

According to the 2010 Census, the ethnic makeup of Chengbu Miao Autonomous County included: 148,232 Miao people (59.14%), 94,051 Han people (37.53%), 3,288 Dong people (1.31%), 2,363 Yao people (0.94%), and 1,654 Hui people (0.66%).

=== Language ===
Mandarin is the official language. The local people speak Kam language, Hmongic languages, and Dungan language.

=== Religion ===
The Dong and Miao people believe in animism and worship ancestors. Buddhism is the earliest foreign religion introduced in the county. Islam spread as Hui people moved into the area.

== Education ==
By the end of 2017, Chengbu Miao Autonomous County had two county vocational secondary schools, 25 high schools and middle schools, 139 primary schools, and 47 kindergartens.

== Transportation ==
=== Expressway ===
The S86 Wugang-Jingzhou Expressway runs northwest to east through the northern county's towns of Xiyan and Maoping and Jiangfang Township.

=== Provincial Highway ===
The Provincial Highway S219 connects the county to Wugang to the north and connects to Provincial Highway S319 to the west.

The Provincial Highway S319 is a north–south highway passing through commercial and residential districts of the county limits.

== Culture ==
Chengbu Miao Autonomous County is rich in culture and customs. The Meishan Culture (梅山文化), Witchcraft Culture (巫傩文化) and Folk Songs (山歌) are the most notable.

== Tourism ==
Chengbu Miao Autonomous County enjoys rich natural landscapes. The most popular natural scenic spots are Nanshan Scenic Area or Nanshan Grasslands, Chang'anying Scenic Area, Shiwan Gutian (十万古田; 'One Hundred Thousand Ancient Farmland'), Baiyun Lake (白云湖; 'White Cloud Lake'), Liangjiang Gorge (两江峡谷; 'Gorge of Two Rivers'), Shajiaodong Nature Reserves (沙角洞自然保护区).

Chengbu Miao Autonomous County is also the hometown for many celebrities. It has a large number of former residences, such as the Former Residence of Yang Wanzhe (杨完者故居), Former Residence of Wang Lin (王麟故居), Former Residence of Lan Yu, and the Former Residence of Gong Jichang.

Chengbu Miao Autonomous County's most notable feature is its ancient bridges, built in the Song, Yuan, Ming and Qing dynasties (960–1911). The Fengyu Bridge (风雨桥; 'Wind-rain Bridge') is the oldest bridge in the county, which was originally built in the Song dynasty (960–1279). Other ancient bridges are the Guma Bridge (古马桥; 'Ancient Horse Bridge'), Fushou Bridge (福寿桥; 'Bridge of Blessing and Longevity'), Yao Bridge (瑶桥; 'Bridge of Yao People'), Liuxi Bridge (柳溪桥; 'Bridge of Willow River'), Luohan Bridge (罗汉桥; 'Arhat Bridge'), Huilong Bridge (回龙桥; 'Bridge of Curved Dragon'), and Yongzhen Bridge (永镇桥).

The Confucian Temple (孔圣庙) is the largest temple complex in the county. It was built in 1889 during the ruling of Guangxu Emperor of the Qing dynasty (1644–1911). The Baiyun Temple (白云寺; 'White Cloud Temple') is a Buddhist temple in the county and Feishan Temple (飞山庙; 'Temple of Mount Flying') is a Taoist temple in the county.

== Notable people ==
Chengbu Miao Autonomous County is the birthplace of:

- Yang Zaixing, a general in the Song dynasty (960–1279).
- Yang Zhengheng (杨正衡; 楊正衡), an official in late Yuan dynasty (1271–1368).
- Lan Yu, a general in late Yuan dynasty (1271–1368) and early Ming dynasty (1368–1644).
- Gong Jichang (龚继昌; 龔繼昌), a general in the Qing dynasty (1644–1911).
- Duan Menghui (段梦晖; 段夢暉), journalist.
- Chen Qiufa, former Director of the China National Space Administration from 2010 to 2013.
