= Jinshi, Xinning County =

Jinshi 金石镇
- Town
- Location of the seat in Hunan
- Coordinates: 26°25′57″N 110°50′49″E
- Country: People's Republic of China
- Province: Hunan
- Prefecture-level city: Shaoyang
- County: Xinning County
- Time zone: UTC+8 (China Standard)

Jinshi (Chinese: 金石镇; pinyin: Jīnshí Zhèn) is a town and the seat of Xinning County in Hunan, China. The town was formed through the amalgamation of Feixianqiao Township (Chinese: 飞仙桥乡), Baisha Town (Chinese: 白沙镇) and the former Jinshi Town on December 2, 2015. It is located in the south western Xinning County, it is bordered by Langshan Town (Chinese: 崀山镇) to the south, Huanglong Town (Chinese: 黄龙镇) and Quanzhou County of Guangxi to the east, Gaoqiao Town (Chinese: 高桥镇) and Wantang Township (Chinese: 万塘乡) to the north, and Shuimiao Town (Chinese: 水庙镇) to the west.

The town has an area of 422.67 km^{2} (163.19 sq mi) with a population of 160,300 (as of 2015). Through the amalgamation of village-level divisions in 2016, its divisions were reduced to 55 from 85. As of 2018, it has seven residential communities, 48 villages, and 6 other areas (including parks, farms, forest area, and research institute) under its jurisdiction. Its seat is Liujiajing Community (Chinese: 刘家井社区).

== See also ==
- List of township-level divisions of Hunan
