= Chang'anying =

Chang'anying 长安营镇
- Town
- Location in Hunan
- Coordinates: 26°16′31″N 110°06′30″E
- Country: People's Republic of China
- Province: Hunan
- Prefecture-level city: Shaoyang
- Autonomous county: Chengbu Miao Autonomous County

Area
  - Total: 260 km^{2} (100 sq mi)

Population (2015)
  - Total: 8,013
  - Density: 31/km^{2} (80/sq mi)
- Time zone: UTC+08:00 (China Standard)
- Postal code: 422507
- Area code: 0739

Chinese name
- Traditional Chinese: 長安營鎮
- Simplified Chinese: 长安营镇
Transcriptions
Standard Mandarin
- Hanyu Pinyin: Cháng'ānyíng Zhèn

Chang'anying (Chinese: 长安营镇) is a rural town in Chengbu Miao Autonomous County, Hunan, China. As of the 2015 census it had a population of 8,013 and an area of 260 square kilometres (100 sq mi). It is surrounded by Zhaishi Miao Ethnic and Dong Ethnic Township on the north, Wanfoshan Town on the west, Dankou Town on the east, Wutuan Town on the southeast, and Pingdeng Town on the southwest. It lies at the border of three provinces of Hunan, Guizhou and Guangxi, which made it even a place of strategic importance in ancient China.

== Name ==
The town was named after Chang'anying, a military camp established in 1741 during the Qianlong period (1736–1795) of the Qing dynasty (1644–1911). "Military camp" is called "Ying" in Chinese. The name of the town means the long period of stability of the town.

== History ==
In the early Han dynasty (206 BC–220 AD), the Miao people settled in the region and became an aboriginal people.

In 1436, in the 1st year of Zhengtong period (1436–1449) of the Ming dynasty (1368–1644), Mengneng (Chinese: 蒙能), a tribal chief of Dong people, united with the Dong and Miao people in Longsheng Various Nationalities Autonomous County to start an uprising. In 1460, they won a military victory.

In 1740, in the region of Qianlong Emperor (1736–1795) of the Qing dynasty (1644–1911), the Qing government put down the rebellion which was led by Miao chiefs Yang Qingbao (Chinese: 杨青保) and Su Xianyu (Chinese: 粟贤宇). In 1741, the Chang'anying, a military organization was set up here. Two years later, the Chang'anying city was built with government funding.

In the early Republic of China (1912–1949), in the midst of the warlord's melee, Zhou Baochen (Chinese: 周宝臣) was a local despot and reigned here. In 1918, he led 500 people to burn the city after robbing it.

On December 31, 2015, the former Nanshan Town (Chinese: 南山镇) was demerged, some areas were merged into Wutuan Town, and the other areas were merged into Chang'anying Township to form a town.

== Administrative divisions ==
As of 2015, the town is divided into 15 villages: Yanzhai (Chinese: 岩寨村), Dazhai (Chinese: 大寨村), Changping (Chinese: 长坪村), Hengpo (Chinese: 横坡村), Shangpai (Chinese: 上排村), Xiapai (Chinese: 下排村), Liujia (Chinese: 六甲村), Liuma (Chinese: 六马村), Desheng (Chinese: 德胜村), Bashu (Chinese: 八树村), Changxing (Chinese: 长兴村), Huangyang (Chinese: 黄洋村), Shuangtang (Chinese: 双塘村), Chang'anying (Chinese: 长安营村), Juezhiping (Chinese: 蕨枝坪村), and 3 communities: Daping (Chinese: 大坪社区), Jianjiaping (Chinese: 建家坪社区), Jizhuaping (Chinese: 鸡爪坪社区).

== Geography ==
The town is located in the southwest of Chengbu Miao Autonomous County. It has a total area of 260 square kilometres (100 sq mi), of which 240 square kilometres (93 sq mi) is land and 20 square kilometres (7.7 sq mi) is water.

The highest point in the town is Nanshan Peak (Chinese: 南山顶) which stands 1,940 metres (6,360 ft) above sea level. The second highest point in the town is Mount Huangzhu (Chinese: 黄竹山), which, at 1,740 metres (5,710 ft) above sea level.

The Pingdeng River (Chinese: 平等河) flows through the town north to south.

== Demographics ==
On December 31, 2015, the National Bureau of Statistics of the People's Republic of China estimates the town's population was 8,013. Miao people is the dominant ethnic group in the town, accounting for 57% of the total population. There are also 12 ethnic groups, such as Dong, Yao, Hui, Zhuang, Tujia and Manchu.

== Botany ==
The town has a 1,600-year-old fir tree.

== Tourist spots ==
The Drum-tower of Dong people (Chinese: 侗族鼓楼) is a famous tourist attraction.

The Wenchang Pavilion (Chinese: 文昌阁) is a historic building in the town.

A Red Army Monument is located in the village of Changping.
