= Wutuan =

Wutuan Town 五团镇
- Town
- Location in Hunan
- Coordinates: 26°03′33″N 110°09′49″E
- Country: China
- Province: Hunan
- Prefecture: Shaoyang
- Autonomous county: Chengbu Miao Autonomous County

Area
  - Total: 173 km^{2} (67 sq mi)

Population (2015)
  - Total: 13,476
  - Density: 77.9/km^{2} (202/sq mi)
- Time zone: UTC+08:00 (China Standard)
- Postal code: 422510
- Area code: 0739

Chinese name
- Traditional Chinese: 五團鎮
- Simplified Chinese: 五团镇
Transcriptions
Standard Mandarin
- Hanyu Pinyin: Wǔtuán Zhèn

Wutuan (Chinese: 五团镇; pinyin: Wǔtuán Zhèn) is a rural town in Chengbu Miao Autonomous County, Hunan, China. As of the 2015 census it had a population of 13,476 and an area of 173 square kilometres (67 sq mi). The town shares a border with Pingdeng Town to the west, Dingping Township to the east, Baimaoping Township to the north, and Weijiang Township to the south. It is a major border trade town, because its north and west sides are Guangxi Zhuang Autonomous Region.

== Name ==
"Wutuan" means five trionychidaes. The name of "Wutuan" derives from five sandbars in the river, which are similar to "trionychidaes", the pronunciation of "trionychidae" in local dialect is "Tuanyu" (Chinese: 团鱼).

== History ==
During the Ming dynasty (1368–1644), it belonged to Moyidong (Chinese: 莫宜峒). In the following Qing dynasty (1644–1911), it came under the jurisdiction of Xiamoyidong (Chinese: 下莫宜峒). In the Republic of China (1912-1949), it was a part of Xianyi Township (Chinese: 咸宜乡). In 1934, the First Front Army of the Chinese Workers' and Peasants' Red Army passed here during the Long March.

After the establishment of the Communist State in 1950, its land belongs to the three townships of Jinshui (Chinese: 金水乡), Jinnan (Chinese: 金南乡) and Wutuan (Chinese: 五团乡). In 1958, the three townships were merged and renamed "Xianyi People's Commune". In 1961 it was split into two communes, namely Jinnan People's Commune and Wutuan People's Commune. In 1984, the two were renamed Jiangtousi Township (Chinese: 江头司乡) and Wutuan Township respectively. In 1995, the Jiangtousi Township was merged into Wutuan Township. In the next year, it was upgraded to a town. On December 31, 2015, the former Nanshan Town (Chinese: 江南山镇) was demerged, some areas were merged into Wutuan Town.

== Administrative divisions ==
As of 2015, the town is divided into 15 villages: Dushu (Chinese: 独树村), Jindong (Chinese: 金东村), Shikong (Chinese: 石空村), Baishuitou (Chinese: 白水头村), Lali (Chinese: 蜡里村), Mugua (Chinese: 木瓜村), Xuntou (Chinese: 巡头村), Pingshan (Chinese: 坪山村), Jiangtousi (Chinese: 江头司村), Mudong (Chinese: 木懂村), Tengping (Chinese: 藤坪村), Chushui (Chinese: 初水村), Chayuan (Chinese: 茶元村), Hengzhou (Chinese: 恒州村), Pulushui (Chinese: 铺路水村), and 2 communities: the 1st Community (Chinese: 第一居委会) and 2nd Community (Chinese: 第二居委会).

== Geography ==
The town is located in the southwest of Chengbu Miao Autonomous County. It has a total area of 173 square kilometres (67 sq mi), of which 143 square kilometres (55 sq mi) is land and 9 square kilometres (3.5 sq mi) is water.

The Furong River (Chinese: 芙蓉河) flows through the town south to north.

== Demographics ==
The National Bureau of Statistics of the People's Republic of China estimates the town's population was 13,476 on December 31, 2015. Miao people is the dominant ethnic group in the town, accounting for 68.57% of the total population. There are also nine ethnic groups, including Dong people, Yao people, Zhuang people and Tujia people. Among them, Han is 1,700, accounting for 13.39%, Dong, Yao, Zhuang and Tujia are 2,400, accounting for 18.90%.

== Economy ==
The town's economy is based on nearby mineral resources and agricultural resources. Underground mineral resources include diabase, tungsten, silicon and lead. Agricultural products include rice, pepper, tomato, pear, tea, cattle, goat, medicinal materials, etc. Among them, pear, tea seed oil, pepper, tofu and fish are famous local products in the town.

== Transportation ==
The County Road X093 passes across the town.
