= Jingwei Township =

Jingwei Township 靖位乡
- Township
- Location in Hunan
- Coordinates: 26°30′54″N 111°9′52″E
- Country: People's Republic of China
- Province: Hunan
- Prefecture-level city: Shaoyang
- County: Xinning County
- Village-level divisions: 5 villages
- Time zone: UTC+8 (China Standard)

Jingwei Township (simplified Chinese: 靖位乡; traditional Chinese: 靖位鄉; pinyin: Jìngwèi Xiāng) is a township of Xinning County in southwestern Hunan province, China. As of 2023, it has five villages under its administration: Jingwei Village, Yuanshui Yao Ethnic Village (源水瑶族村), Xiaoyan Village (笑岩村), Yanshan Village (烟山村), and Xiangfei Village (湘榧村).

== See also ==
- List of township-level divisions of Hunan
