= Taohong =

Taohong 桃洪镇
- Town
- Location in Hunan
- Coordinates: 27°06′40″N 111°01′37″E
- Country: People's Republic of China
- Province: Hunan
- Prefecture-level city: Shaoyang
- County: Longhui County
- Time zone: UTC+8 (China Standard)

Taohong (Chinese: 桃洪镇; pinyin: Táohóng Zhèn) is a town and the seat of Longhui County in Hunan, China. The town was established in 1942 and reorganized through the amalgamation of Shimen Township (Chinese: 石门乡), Yushanpu Town (Chinese: 雨山铺镇) and the former Taohong Town on November 24, 2015.

It is located in the middle part of southern Longhui County, the town is bordered by Hexiangqiao Town (Chinese: 荷香桥镇) and Tantou Town (Chinese: 滩头镇) to the north, by Zhouwang Town (Chinese: 周旺镇) to the west, by Beishan Town (Chinese: 北山镇), Shanjie Township (Chinese: 山界回族乡) and Sangesi Town (Chinese: 三阁司镇) to the south, by Nanyuemiao Town (Chinese: 南岳庙镇) to the east. The town has an area of 263.69 km^{2} (101.81 sq mi) with a population of 202,400 (as of 2015). Through the merging villages and communities in 2016, its subdivisions were reduced to 76 from 139. As of 2018 it has 60 villages and 16 residential communities under its jurisdiction. Its seat is Xinlong Community (Chinese: 新隆社区).

== Administrative divisions ==
Administrative divisions of Taohong Town (2016 - present)
villages or communities		villages	
English	Chinese	English	Chinese
Changling Community	长岭社区	Jiulongwan Village	九龙湾村
Chashan Community	茶山社区	Laoyin Village	老银村
Dajing Community	大井社区	Longfu Village	龙富村
Hengjiang Community	横江社区	Maijitang Village	迈迹塘村
Heping Community	和平社区	Moshi Village	磨石村
Heyetang Community	荷叶塘社区	Muliang Village	木梁村
Hongtang Community	洪塘社区	Nanshan Village	南山村
Liziyuan Community	梨子园社区	Nantang Village	南塘村
Shuangjing Community	双井社区	Paitou Village	排头村
Taohua Community	桃花社区	Qili Village	七里村
Xinlong Community	新隆社区	Qilin Village	麒麟村
Yongsheng Community	永胜社区	Qinghuajiang Village	青花江村
Yuanli Community	院里社区	Qinjin Village	勤进村
Yushanpu Community	雨山铺社区	Sanhe Village	三和村
Zhushantang Community	竹山塘社区	Shimen Village	石门村
Zixiayuan Community	紫霞园社区	Shuangchang Village	双长村
Baiyaoshan Village	白窑山村	Shuyuan Village	书院村
Baohe Village	保和村	Taipingzhou Village	太平洲村
Bayi Village	八一村	Tianfu Village	天福村
Changfu Village	长扶村	Tianlong Village	天龙村
Datangkeng Village	大塘坑村	Tongjiang Village	铜江村
Dawei Village	大为村	Tongpenjiang Village	铜盆江村
Fulong Village	富隆村	Tuoxin Village	托新村
Furongshan Village	芙蓉山村	Wanglong Village	旺龙村
Gaotian Village	高田村	Wenchang Village	文昌村
Hejing Village	合井村	Wenming Village	文明村
Helong Village	合龙村	Xinghua Village	兴华村
Helongxi Village	合龙溪村	Xinglong Village	兴隆村
Hema Village	和码村	Xingwang Village	兴旺村
Hongxing Village	红星村	Xisohuitang Village	小水塘村
Hualuzhou Village	花路洲村	Yali Village	雅里村
Huamen Village	花门村	Yanchong Village	砚冲村
Huaqiao Village	花桥村	Yangliu Village	杨柳村
Jiangwan Village	江湾村	Yangzhutang Village	杨竹塘村
Jinchang Village	井长村	Yejia Village	叶家村
Jingzhu Village	荆枝村	Yuanle Village	阮乐村
Jinlongshan Village	金龙山村	Zengjia'ao Village	曾家坳村
Jiulong Village	九龙村	Zhutang Village	竹塘村
