= Shaoyang Wugang Airport =

Shaoyang Wugang Airport 邵阳武冈机场
- IATA: WGN; ICAO: ZGSY

Summary
- Airport type: Public
- Serves: Shaoyang, Hunan, China
- Location: Wugang, Hunan
- Opened: 28 June 2017
- Elevation AMSL: 440 m / 1,444 ft
- Coordinates: 26.802°N 110.642°E

Map
- Location of airport in Hunan

Runways
Direction	Length		Surface
Direction	m	ft	Surface
03/21	2,600	8,530

Statistics (2021)
- Passengers: 302,563
- Aircraft movements: 4,250
- Cargo (metric tons): 3.8

Shaoyang Wugang Airport
- Simplified Chinese: 邵阳武冈机场
- Traditional Chinese: 邵陽武岡機場
Transcriptions
Standard Mandarin
- Hanyu Pinyin: Shàoyáng Wǔgāng Jīchǎng

Shaoyang Wugang Airport (IATA: WGN, ICAO: ZGSY) is an airport serving the city of Shaoyang in Hunan Province, China. It is located 9 kilometres (5.6 mi) north of Wugang, a county-level city under the administration of Shaoyang, and 100 kilometres (62 mi) from the urban center of Shaoyang. The airport received approval from the State Council of China and the Central Military Commission in July 2013. It is expected to cost 957 million yuan to build. The airport was opened on 28 June 2017, with an inaugural China Southern Airlines flight from Changsha Huanghua International Airport.

== Facilities ==
The airport has a 2,600-meter runway and a 3,000-square-meter terminal building. It is projected to handle 250,000 passengers and 500 tons of cargo annually by 2020.

== Airlines and destinations ==
Airlines	Destinations
Air China	Beijing–Capital
Hainan Airlines	Haikou, Xi'an
Shenzhen Airlines	Chengdu–Tianfu, Shenzhen

== See also ==
- List of airports in China
- List of the busiest airports in China
