= Longhui County =

Longhui 隆回县
- County
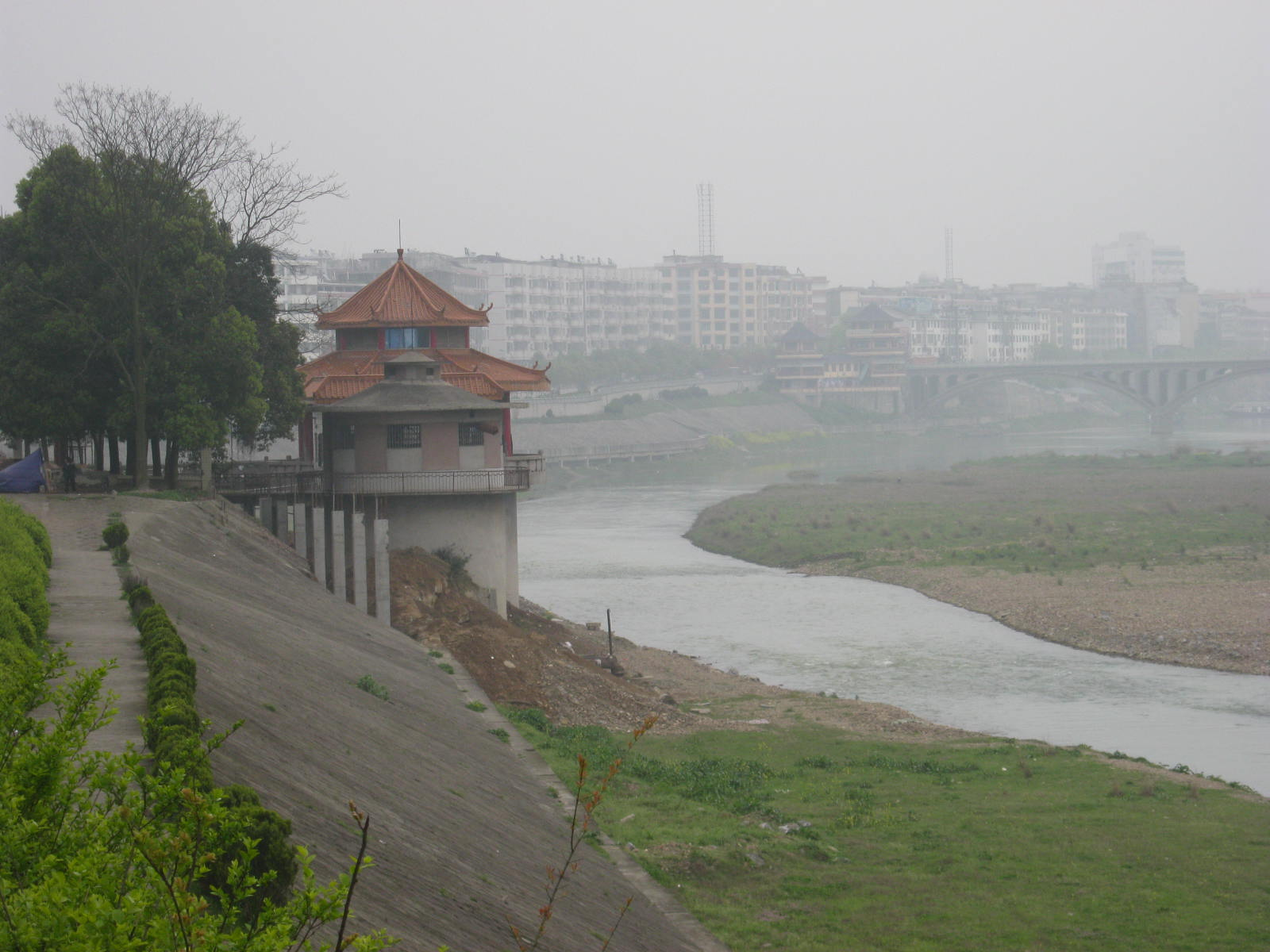
- Motto: 只要来隆回，一切都优惠 (Coming to Longhui will only bring benefits.)
- Location of the seat in Hunan
- Coordinates (Longhui County government): 27°06′50″N 111°01′57″E
- Country: People's Republic of China
- Province: Hunan
- Prefecture-level city: Shaoyang

Area
  - Total: 2,855.86 km^{2} (1,102.65 sq mi)

Population (2009)
  - Total: 110,000
  - Density: 39/km^{2} (100/sq mi)
- Time zone: UTC+8 (China Standard)
- Postal code: 422200
- Area code: 0739
- Website: longhui.gov.cn

Longhui County (simplified Chinese: 隆回县; traditional Chinese: 隆回縣; pinyin: Lónghuí Xiàn; lit. 'grand return') is a county and the 6th most populous county-level division in the Province of Hunan, China; it is under the administration of Shaoyang City. Located in the mid-eastern Hunan, the county is bordered to the north by Xinhua and Xupu Counties, to the west by Dongkou County, to the south by Wugang City and Shaoyang County, and to the east by Xinshao County. Longhui County covers an area of 2,867.67 km^{2} (1,107.21 sq mi), and as of 2015, it had a registered population of 1,231,600 and a permanent resident population of 1,100,900. The county has 17 towns and seven townships under its jurisdiction, and the county seat is Taohong Town (桃洪镇). The county was amongst the list of impoverished places of China, and finally got off the poverty list in the early 2000s.

== Administrative divisions ==
17 towns

- Beishan (北山镇)
- Gaoping (高平镇)
- Hengbanqiao (横板桥镇)
- Hexiangqiao (荷香桥镇)
- Jinshiqiao (金石桥镇)
- Liuduzhai (六都寨镇)
- Nanyuemiao (南岳庙镇)
- Qijiang (七江镇)
- Sangesi (三阁司镇)
- Simenqian (司门前镇)
- Tantou (滩头镇)
- Taohong (桃洪镇)
- Xiaoshajiang (小沙江镇)
- Xiyangjiang (西洋江镇)
- Yankou (岩口镇)
- Yatian (鸭田镇)
- Zhouwang (周旺镇)

5 townships

- Dashuitian (大水田乡)
- Hetian (荷田乡)
- Luohong (罗洪乡)
- Matangshan (麻塘山乡)
- Yanggu'ao (羊古坳乡)

2 ethnic townships

- Yao Huxingshan (虎形山瑶族乡)
- Hui Shanjie (山界回族乡)

== Climate ==
Climate data for Longhui, elevation 308 m (1,010 ft), (1991–2020 normals, extremes 1991–present)
Month	Jan	Feb	Mar	Apr	May	Jun	Jul	Aug	Sep	Oct	Nov	Dec	Year
Record high °C (°F)	26.3 (79.3)	30.8 (87.4)	32.9 (91.2)	35.6 (96.1)	36.6 (97.9)	37.2 (99.0)	39.2 (102.6)	39.6 (103.3)	37.4 (99.3)	36.2 (97.2)	30.6 (87.1)	23.4 (74.1)	39.6 (103.3)
Mean daily maximum °C (°F)	9.0 (48.2)	11.7 (53.1)	15.9 (60.6)	22.4 (72.3)	26.7 (80.1)	29.6 (85.3)	32.8 (91.0)	32.4 (90.3)	28.7 (83.7)	23.2 (73.8)	17.8 (64.0)	11.8 (53.2)	21.8 (71.3)
Daily mean °C (°F)	5.6 (42.1)	7.9 (46.2)	11.7 (53.1)	17.7 (63.9)	22.0 (71.6)	25.4 (77.7)	28.0 (82.4)	27.5 (81.5)	23.9 (75.0)	18.6 (65.5)	13.2 (55.8)	7.7 (45.9)	17.4 (63.4)
Mean daily minimum °C (°F)	3.2 (37.8)	5.2 (41.4)	8.8 (47.8)	14.3 (57.7)	18.7 (65.7)	22.4 (72.3)	24.4 (75.9)	24.0 (75.2)	20.5 (68.9)	15.3 (59.5)	9.9 (49.8)	4.8 (40.6)	14.3 (57.7)
Record low °C (°F)	−6.5 (20.3)	−5.4 (22.3)	−0.8 (30.6)	2.2 (36.0)	10.1 (50.2)	15.4 (59.7)	17.5 (63.5)	16.8 (62.2)	12.3 (54.1)	4.5 (40.1)	−0.4 (31.3)	−6.5 (20.3)	−6.5 (20.3)
Average precipitation mm (inches)	63.2 (2.49)	68.4 (2.69)	125.6 (4.94)	134.6 (5.30)	177.7 (7.00)	208.0 (8.19)	158.9 (6.26)	116.4 (4.58)	69.2 (2.72)	74.1 (2.92)	66.9 (2.63)	48.7 (1.92)	1,311.7 (51.64)
Average precipitation days (≥ 0.1 mm)	14.7	14.2	17.8	16.6	17.0	16.4	11.7	11.8	8.2	10.2	10.7	11.0	160.3
Average snowy days	3.6	2.2	0.5	0	0	0	0	0	0	0	0	1.2	7.5
Average relative humidity (%)	78	78	80	79	80	82	77	77	76	76	77	75	78
Mean monthly sunshine hours	51.3	51.3	67.1	99.3	121.9	122.2	208.8	188.6	141.4	114.4	103.8	82.0	1,352.1
Percentage possible sunshine	16	16	18	26	29	30	50	47	39	32	32	25	30
Source: China Meteorological Administration all-time May record high
