= Changpu =

Town in Hunan, China

Coordinates: 26°35′31″N 110°8′51″E

Changpu Town (Chinese: 长铺镇; pinyin: Chángpù Zhèn) is a town and the county seat of Suining County in Hunan, China. Formed in 1954, it is located in the south eastern part of the county. The town has an area of 12.6 km^{2} (4.9 sq mi) with a population of 44,265 (as of 2010 census). It has 2 villages and 6 communities under its jurisdiction.
