= Xinning County =

Xinning 新宁县 Sinning
- County
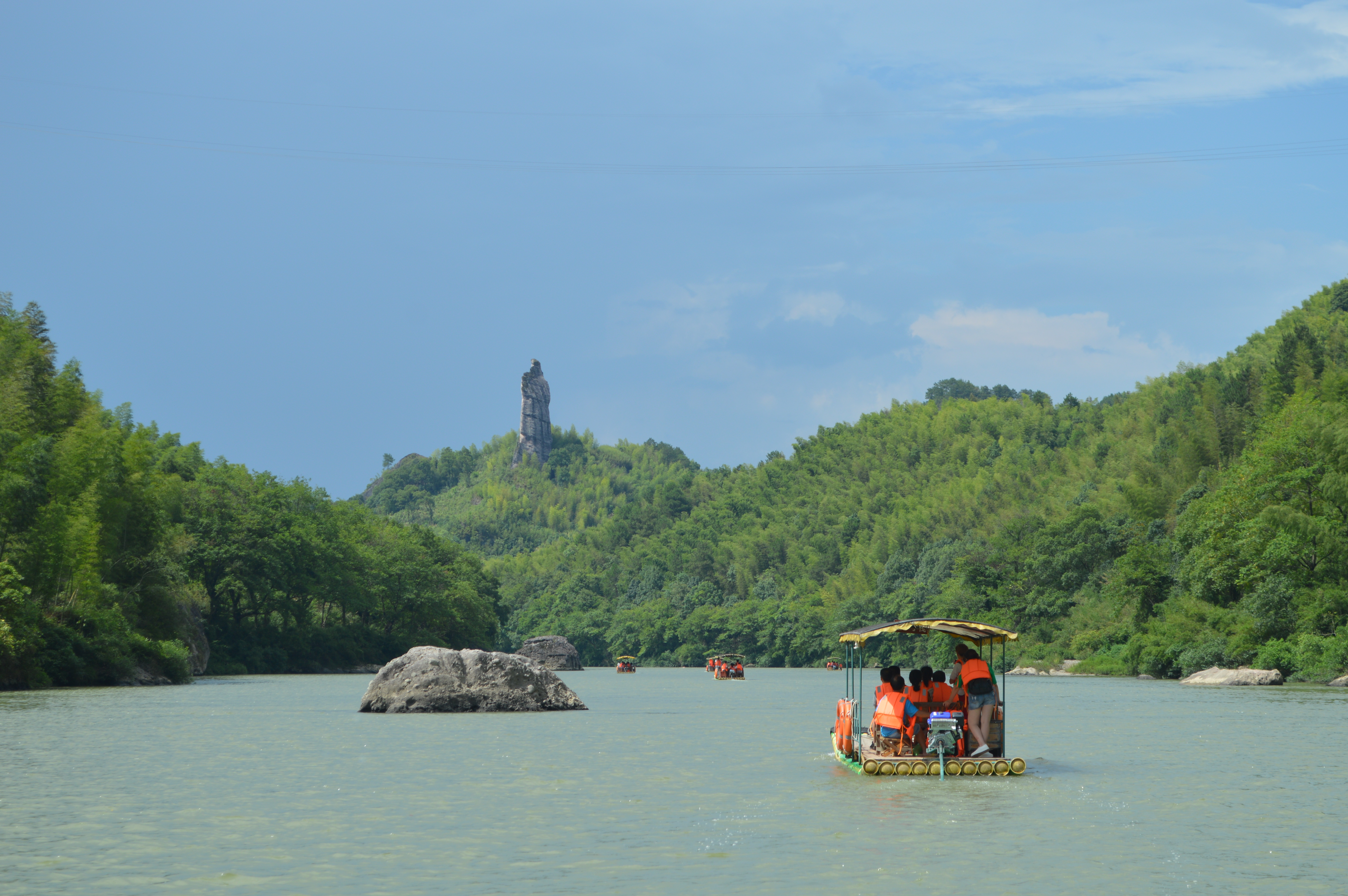

- Location in Hunan
- Coordinates: 26°25′59″N 110°51′25″E
- Country: People's Republic of China
- Province: Hunan
- Prefecture-level city: Shaoyang
- Time zone: UTC+8 (China Standard)

Xinning
- Traditional Chinese: 新寧
- Simplified Chinese: 新宁
- Literal meaning: Newly Pacified
Transcriptions
Standard Mandarin
- Hanyu Pinyin: Xīnníng

Xinning County (Chinese: 新宁县; pinyin: Xīnníng Xiàn) is a county in the Province of Hunan, China, it is under the administration of Shaoyang City. Located on the south western margin of Hunan, the county is bordered to the northeast by Shaoyang County, to the northwest by Wugang City, to the west by Chengbu Autonomous County, to the south by Ziyuan County of Guangxi, to the east by Dong'an County. Xinning County covers 2,756.13 km^{2} (1,064.15 sq mi), as of 2015, it had a registered population of 649,700 and a permanent resident population of 574,100. The county has eight towns and eight townships under its jurisdiction, and the county seat is Jinshi (金石镇).

== Administrative divisions ==
As of 2022, Yanling County has 8 towns 6 townships and 2 ethnic townships.

8 towns

- Gaoqiao (高桥镇)
- Huanglong (黄龙镇)
- Huilongsi (回龙寺镇)
- Jinshi (金石镇)
- Langshan (崀山镇)
- Matouqiao (马头桥镇)
- Shuimiao (水庙镇)
- Yidushui (一渡水镇)

6 townships

- Anshan (安山乡)
- Fengtian (丰田乡)
- Jingwei (靖位乡)
- Qingjiangqiao (清江桥乡)
- Wantang (万塘乡)
- Xuntian (巡田乡)

2 ethnic townships

- Huangjin (Yao) (黄金瑶族乡)
- Malin (Yao) (麻林瑶族乡)

== Ethnic groups ==
The Xinning County Gazetteer (1995:653) lists the following ethnic groups and their respective locations.

- Yao
  - Malin Township 麻林乡
  - Huangjin Township 黄金乡
  - Shuiyuan Village 水源村, Jingwei Township 靖位乡
- Miao
  - Huangjin Township 黄金乡

== Climate ==
Climate data for Xinning, elevation 346 m (1,135 ft), (1991–2020 normals, extremes 1991–present)
Month	Jan	Feb	Mar	Apr	May	Jun	Jul	Aug	Sep	Oct	Nov	Dec	Year
Record high °C (°F)	26.0 (78.8)	31.3 (88.3)	32.2 (90.0)	35.6 (96.1)	36.4 (97.5)	37.4 (99.3)	39.7 (103.5)	39.9 (103.8)	38.2 (100.8)	36.5 (97.7)	32.1 (89.8)	26.0 (78.8)	39.9 (103.8)
Mean daily maximum °C (°F)	9.4 (48.9)	12.3 (54.1)	16.5 (61.7)	23.2 (73.8)	27.3 (81.1)	29.9 (85.8)	33.0 (91.4)	32.5 (90.5)	28.6 (83.5)	23.3 (73.9)	18.1 (64.6)	12.2 (54.0)	22.2 (71.9)
Daily mean °C (°F)	5.7 (42.3)	8.3 (46.9)	12.1 (53.8)	18.2 (64.8)	22.3 (72.1)	25.6 (78.1)	28.1 (82.6)	27.2 (81.0)	23.5 (74.3)	18.3 (64.9)	13.1 (55.6)	7.7 (45.9)	17.5 (63.5)
Mean daily minimum °C (°F)	3.4 (38.1)	5.6 (42.1)	9.2 (48.6)	14.7 (58.5)	18.8 (65.8)	22.6 (72.7)	24.6 (76.3)	23.7 (74.7)	20.0 (68.0)	15.0 (59.0)	9.8 (49.6)	4.7 (40.5)	14.3 (57.8)
Record low °C (°F)	−7.5 (18.5)	−6.0 (21.2)	−0.5 (31.1)	2.4 (36.3)	10.0 (50.0)	12.9 (55.2)	17.7 (63.9)	15.0 (59.0)	11.1 (52.0)	3.4 (38.1)	−0.6 (30.9)	−7.5 (18.5)	−7.5 (18.5)
Average precipitation mm (inches)	70.7 (2.78)	74.2 (2.92)	123.5 (4.86)	131.9 (5.19)	177.8 (7.00)	184.4 (7.26)	138.1 (5.44)	135.9 (5.35)	78.4 (3.09)	84.7 (3.33)	69.2 (2.72)	56.8 (2.24)	1,325.6 (52.18)
Average precipitation days (≥ 0.1 mm)	16.2	15.8	19.5	17.0	17.5	16.5	12.3	13.9	11.3	12.4	12.1	12.4	176.9
Average snowy days	3.8	2.0	0.3	0	0	0	0	0	0	0	0.1	1.1	7.3
Average relative humidity (%)	83	82	83	80	80	80	74	77	80	81	82	80	80
Mean monthly sunshine hours	50.9	52.4	67.5	101.3	122.4	120.0	201.2	171.3	127.6	107.9	96.2	82.6	1,301.3
Percentage possible sunshine	15	16	18	26	29	29	48	43	35	31	30	25	29
Source: China Meteorological Administration

== See also ==
- Other Xinnings, particularly the more famous former Xinning County in Guangdong, now Taishan
