= Xiyan, Chengbu =

Xiyan Town 西岩镇
- Town
- Location in Hunan
- Coordinates: 26°37′25″N 110°29′14″E
- Country: China
- Province: Hunan
- Prefecture: Shaoyang
- Autonomous county: Chengbu Miao Autonomous County

Area
  - Total: 150 km^{2} (58 sq mi)

Population (2015)
  - Total: 54,200
  - Density: 360/km^{2} (940/sq mi)
- Time zone: UTC+08:00 (China Standard)
- Postal code: 422504
- Area code: 0739

Chinese name
- Traditional Chinese: 西岩鎮
- Simplified Chinese: 西岩镇
Transcriptions
Standard Mandarin
- Hanyu Pinyin: Xīyán Zhèn

Xiyan (Chinese: 西岩镇) is a rural town in Chengbu Miao Autonomous County, Hunan, China. As of the 2015 census it had a population of 54,200 and an area of 150 square kilometres (58 sq mi). The town shares a border with Jinzi Township to the west, Weixi Township to the east, Dengyuantai Town to the north, and Maoping Town to the south.

== Name ==
The name of "Xiyan" derives from Xiyan Temple (Chinese: 西岩寺), a Buddhist temple located at the foot of Lion Rock (Chinese: 狮子岩).

== History ==
In March 2002, archaeologists excavated a late Neolithic site in Chaoyuanli (Chinese: 朝园里) of the town, unearthed pottery and stone tools, proving that human existence existed as early as 4000 years ago.

In 1995, the five townships of Jinzi (Chinese: 金紫乡), Ziyuan (Chinese: 资源乡), Sanshui (Chinese: 三水乡), Yongfeng (Chinese: 永丰乡) and Huaqiao (Chinese: 花桥乡) merged into Xiyan Town.

== Administrative divisions ==
As of 2015, the town is divided into 2 communities: the 1st Community (Chinese: 第一居委会) and 2nd Community (Chinese: 第二居委会), and 24 villages: Shilong (Chinese: 石龙村), Dengta (Chinese: 灯塔村), Biyun (Chinese: 碧云村), Lianxin (Chinese: 联心村), Jiangshi (Chinese: 江石村), Liantang (Chinese: 联塘村), Chenshi (Chinese: 陈石村), Changkang (Chinese: 长康村), Xingsong (Chinese: 兴松村), Yongfeng (Chinese: 永丰村), Zijiang (Chinese: 资江村), Zishui (Chinese: 资水村), Sanshui (Chinese: 三水村), Pingtang (Chinese: 坪塘村), Jinsha (Chinese: 金沙村), Taitang (Chinese: 太塘村), Luoshui (Chinese: 落水村), Lianhe (Chinese: 联合村), Sanhe (Chinese: 三合村), Huaqiao (Chinese: 花桥村), Yangtian (Chinese: 杨田村), Xiaoshi (Chinese: 小石村), Yuanshui (Chinese: 源水村), Yangjiashan (Chinese: 杨家山村).

== Geography ==
The town is located in the northeast of Chengbu Miao Autonomous County. It has a total area of 150 square kilometres (58 sq mi), of which 142 square kilometres (55 sq mi) is land and 8 square kilometres (3.1 sq mi) is water.

The Wei River (Chinese: 威溪) flows through the town.

=== Climate ===
The town has a subtropical humid climate and exhibits four distinct seasons, with an average annual temperature of 18 °C (64 °F). Summer is cool and winter is warm.

== Demographics ==
In December 2015, the town had an estimated population of 54,200 and a population density of 361 persons per km2. Miao people is the dominant ethnic group in the town, accounting for 34,000, accounting for 64.19%. There are also 12 ethnic groups, such as Dong, Hui, Yao and Li people. Among them, there are 11,500 Han people (21.40%) and 8,800 Dong, Yao, Hui and Li people (16.30%).

== Economy ==
The region abounds with zinc, cadmium, manganese, phosphorus and molybdenum.

== Transportation ==
The town is connected to two highways: S86 Wugang-Jingzhou Expressway, which heads west to Tongdao Dong Autonomous County and east to downtown Wugang city, and Provincial Highway S219, which heads south to Maoping Town, Jiangfang Township, Rulin Town, Dingping Township and east to downtown Wugang city.

== Notable people ==
- Yang Zaixing (1081 - 1140), a Song dynasty general under Yue Fei, known for his ferocity in battles.
- Gong Jichang (Chinese: 龚继昌), a general in the late Qing dynasty.
- Duan Menghui (Chinese: 段梦晖; 1907 - 1981), a journalist.
