= Ziyuan County =

Ziyuan County 资源县 · Swhyenz Yen
- County
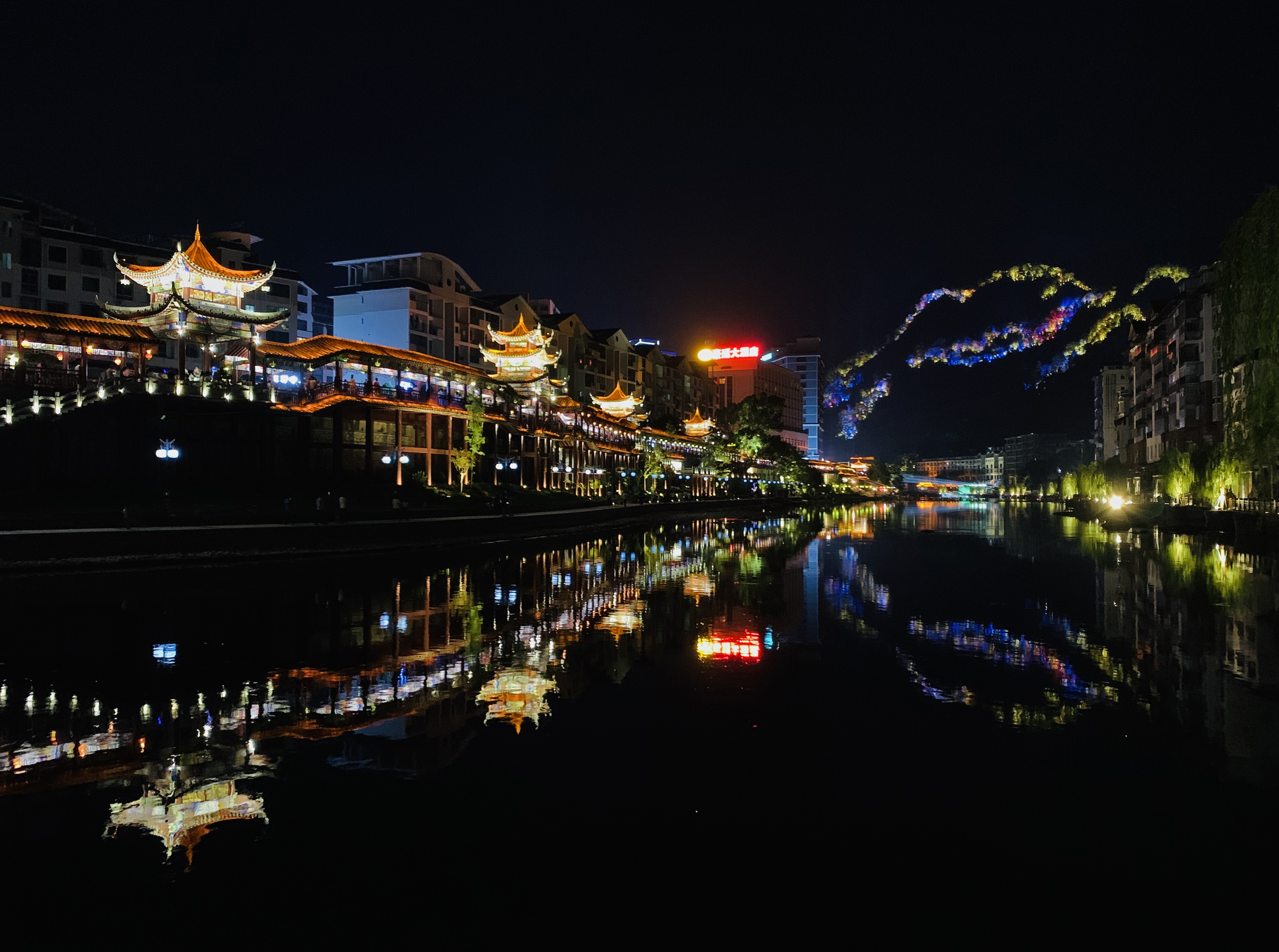

- Location of the seat in Guangxi
- Coordinates: 26°02′31″N 110°39′11″E
- Country: China
- Autonomous region: Guangxi
- Prefecture-level city: Guilin
- County seat: Ziyuan Town

Area
  - Total: 1,961.14 km^{2} (757.20 sq mi)

Population (2020)
  - Total: 139,212
  - Density: 70.9852/km^{2} (183.851/sq mi)
- Time zone: UTC+8 (China Standard)

Ziyuan County (simplified Chinese: 资源县; traditional Chinese: 資源縣; pinyin: Zīyuán Xiàn; Zhuang: Swhyenz Yen) is a county in the northeast of Guangxi, China, bordering Hunan province to the north. It is under the administration of the prefecture-level city of Guilin.

== Administrative divisions ==
Ziyuan County is divided into 3 towns, 1 township and 3 ethnic townships:

towns

- Ziyuan Town 资源镇
- Zhongfeng Town 中峰镇
- Meixi Town 梅溪镇

township

- Guali Township 瓜里乡

ethnic townships

- Chetian Miao Ethnic Township 车田苗族乡
- Liangshui Miao Ethnic Township 两水苗族乡
- Hekou Yao Ethnic Township 河口瑶族乡

== Languages ==
The Ziyuan County Gazetteer lists the following languages and their respective distributions.

- Chinese
- Miao: in Chetian 车田苗族乡; Liangtian 两水苗族乡; Hekou 河口瑶族乡 (in Dawan 大湾, Congping 葱坪); Meixi 梅溪乡 (in Chaping 茶坪)
- Yao: in Hekou 河口瑶族乡 (in Congping 葱坪, Houbei 猴背, Gaoshan 高山); Liangshui 两水苗族乡 (in Fengshui 凤水, Sheshui 社水); Zhongfeng 中峰乡 (in Sheling 社岭, Bafang 八坊); Tingdong 延东乡 (in Shixitou 石溪头, Putian 浦田)

== Climate ==
Climate data for Ziyuan, elevation 408 m (1,339 ft), (1991–2020 normals, extremes 1963–2010)
Month	Jan	Feb	Mar	Apr	May	Jun	Jul	Aug	Sep	Oct	Nov	Dec	Year
Record high °C (°F)	23.6 (74.5)	29.7 (85.5)	32.2 (90.0)	33.3 (91.9)	34.2 (93.6)	36.6 (97.9)	38.4 (101.1)	38.8 (101.8)	37.1 (98.8)	35.1 (95.2)	31.0 (87.8)	25.9 (78.6)	38.8 (101.8)
Mean daily maximum °C (°F)	9.8 (49.6)	12.5 (54.5)	16.2 (61.2)	22.5 (72.5)	26.4 (79.5)	29.0 (84.2)	31.4 (88.5)	31.6 (88.9)	28.6 (83.5)	23.5 (74.3)	18.6 (65.5)	12.9 (55.2)	21.9 (71.5)
Daily mean °C (°F)	6.0 (42.8)	8.4 (47.1)	12.1 (53.8)	17.7 (63.9)	21.6 (70.9)	24.7 (76.5)	26.5 (79.7)	26.0 (78.8)	22.9 (73.2)	18.1 (64.6)	13.0 (55.4)	7.9 (46.2)	17.1 (62.7)
Mean daily minimum °C (°F)	3.5 (38.3)	5.7 (42.3)	9.2 (48.6)	14.4 (57.9)	18.2 (64.8)	21.9 (71.4)	23.1 (73.6)	22.5 (72.5)	19.4 (66.9)	14.7 (58.5)	9.6 (49.3)	4.7 (40.5)	13.9 (57.0)
Record low °C (°F)	−8.4 (16.9)	−3.9 (25.0)	−2.6 (27.3)	1.6 (34.9)	7.4 (45.3)	10.8 (51.4)	15.5 (59.9)	16.5 (61.7)	10.9 (51.6)	2.0 (35.6)	−1.8 (28.8)	−6.8 (19.8)	−8.4 (16.9)
Average precipitation mm (inches)	75.8 (2.98)	92.9 (3.66)	150.3 (5.92)	181.6 (7.15)	310.8 (12.24)	316.8 (12.47)	233.7 (9.20)	147.9 (5.82)	68.8 (2.71)	70.8 (2.79)	79.6 (3.13)	56.2 (2.21)	1,785.2 (70.28)
Average precipitation days (≥ 0.1 mm)	15.6	15.7	20.5	19.0	19.4	19.5	16.3	14.8	9.8	9.7	10.5	11.3	182.1
Average snowy days	3.9	2.2	0.5	0	0	0	0	0	0	0	0.1	0.9	7.6
Average relative humidity (%)	79	80	82	81	82	84	81	81	80	79	79	76	80
Mean monthly sunshine hours	51.9	50.7	60.2	92.3	111.2	105.1	181.3	178.7	140.3	118.2	101.6	87.8	1,279.3
Percentage possible sunshine	16	16	16	24	27	26	43	45	38	33	31	27	29
Source: China Meteorological Administration all-time extreme low
