= Suining County, Hunan =

Suining 绥宁县
- County
- Location in Hunan
- Coordinates (Suining County government): 26°34′55″N 110°09′21″E
- Country: People's Republic of China
- Province: Hunan
- Prefecture-level city: Shaoyang
- Time zone: UTC+8 (China Standard)

Suining County (simplified Chinese: 绥宁县; traditional Chinese: 綏寧縣; pinyin: Suíníng Xiàn) is a county in the Province of Hunan, China, it is under the administration of Shaoyang City. Located in the southwest of the province, the county is bordered to the north by Dongkou County, to the west by Huitong and Jingzhou Counties, to the southwest by Tongdao County, to the southeast by Chengbu County, and to the east by Wugang City. Suining County covers an area of 2,917 km^{2} (1,126 sq mi), and as of 2015, it had a registered population of 387,800 and a permanent resident population of 356,800. The county has nine towns and eight townships under its jurisdiction. The county seat is the town of Changpu (长铺镇).

== Administrative divisions ==
8 towns

- Changpu (长铺镇)
- Huangtukuang (黄土矿镇)
- Jinwutang (金屋塘镇)
- Lixiqiao (李熙桥镇)
- Tangjiafang (唐家坊镇)
- Wawutang (瓦屋塘镇)
- Wuyang (武阳镇)
- Hongyan (红岩镇)

1 township

- Shuikou (水口乡)

8 ethnic townships

- Changpuzi (长铺子苗族侗族乡)
- Dongshan (东山侗族乡)
- Egongshan (鹅公岭侗族苗族乡)
- Guanxia (关峡苗族乡)
- Hekou (河口苗族乡)
- Le'anpu (乐安铺苗族侗族乡)
- Matang (麻塘苗族瑶族乡)
- Zhaishi (寨市苗族侗族乡)

== Languages ==
In Suining County, ethnic Yao live in Lianmin 联民乡, Shuikou 水口乡, and Jinwutang 金屋塘乡 townships. The dialect of Xiaohuang, Tianluoxuan Village, Lianmin Township (联民乡田螺旋村小黄组) is included in the Suining County Gazetteer (1997).

Chinese dialects are spoken by the ethnic Miao of Guanxia 关峡苗族乡 and Matang 麻塘苗族乡 ethnic Miao townships.

== Climate ==
Climate data for Suining, elevation 310 m (1,020 ft), (1991–2020 normals, extremes 1991–present)
| Month | Jan | Feb | Mar | Apr | May | Jun | Jul | Aug | Sep | Oct | Nov | Dec | Year |
|---|---|---|---|---|---|---|---|---|---|---|---|---|---|
| Record high °C (°F) | 26.2 (79.2) | 31.8 (89.2) | 32.9 (91.2) | 36.4 (97.5) | 37.4 (99.3) | 37.7 (99.9) | 38.7 (101.7) | 39.5 (103.1) | 38.7 (101.7) | 35.6 (96.1) | 31.3 (88.3) | 27.5 (81.5) | 39.5 (103.1) |
| Mean daily maximum °C (°F) | 10.1 (50.2) | 13.1 (55.6) | 17.1 (62.8) | 23.7 (74.7) | 27.6 (81.7) | 30.3 (86.5) | 32.9 (91.2) | 32.7 (90.9) | 29.4 (84.9) | 24.1 (75.4) | 19.0 (66.2) | 13.2 (55.8) | 22.8 (73.0) |
| Daily mean °C (°F) | 6.3 (43.3) | 8.6 (47.5) | 12.3 (54.1) | 17.8 (64.0) | 21.9 (71.4) | 25.1 (77.2) | 26.9 (80.4) | 26.5 (79.7) | 23.5 (74.3) | 18.5 (65.3) | 13.4 (56.1) | 8.3 (46.9) | 17.4 (63.4) |
| Mean daily minimum °C (°F) | 3.9 (39.0) | 5.8 (42.4) | 9.3 (48.7) | 14.2 (57.6) | 18.2 (64.8) | 21.8 (71.2) | 23.2 (73.8) | 22.9 (73.2) | 19.9 (67.8) | 15.2 (59.4) | 10.2 (50.4) | 5.4 (41.7) | 14.2 (57.5) |
| Record low °C (°F) | −5.0 (23.0) | −3.2 (26.2) | −0.3 (31.5) | 2.0 (35.6) | 9.6 (49.3) | 14.7 (58.5) | 17.6 (63.7) | 16.3 (61.3) | 11.9 (53.4) | 2.6 (36.7) | −1.0 (30.2) | −5.0 (23.0) | −5.0 (23.0) |
| Average precipitation mm (inches) | 60.7 (2.39) | 66.3 (2.61) | 120.3 (4.74) | 137.2 (5.40) | 201.9 (7.95) | 212.1 (8.35) | 165.7 (6.52) | 130.2 (5.13) | 70.8 (2.79) | 81.7 (3.22) | 68.2 (2.69) | 49.4 (1.94) | 1,364.5 (53.73) |
| Average precipitation days (≥ 0.1 mm) | 15.3 | 13.8 | 17.6 | 17.3 | 16.9 | 16.4 | 13.5 | 13.7 | 10.0 | 11.4 | 10.9 | 11.6 | 168.4 |
| Average snowy days | 4.1 | 2.1 | 0.4 | 0 | 0 | 0 | 0 | 0 | 0 | 0 | 0.1 | 1.0 | 7.7 |
| Average relative humidity (%) | 77 | 77 | 79 | 79 | 80 | 82 | 80 | 79 | 78 | 78 | 77 | 74 | 78 |
| Mean monthly sunshine hours | 50.7 | 55.3 | 68.0 | 99.6 | 119.5 | 114.6 | 184.6 | 179.0 | 139.4 | 112.0 | 103.8 | 80.7 | 1,307.2 |
| Percentage possible sunshine | 15 | 17 | 18 | 26 | 29 | 28 | 44 | 45 | 38 | 32 | 32 | 25 | 29 |
Source: China Meteorological Administration
