= Shaoyang =

Shaoyang 邵阳市
- Prefecture-level city
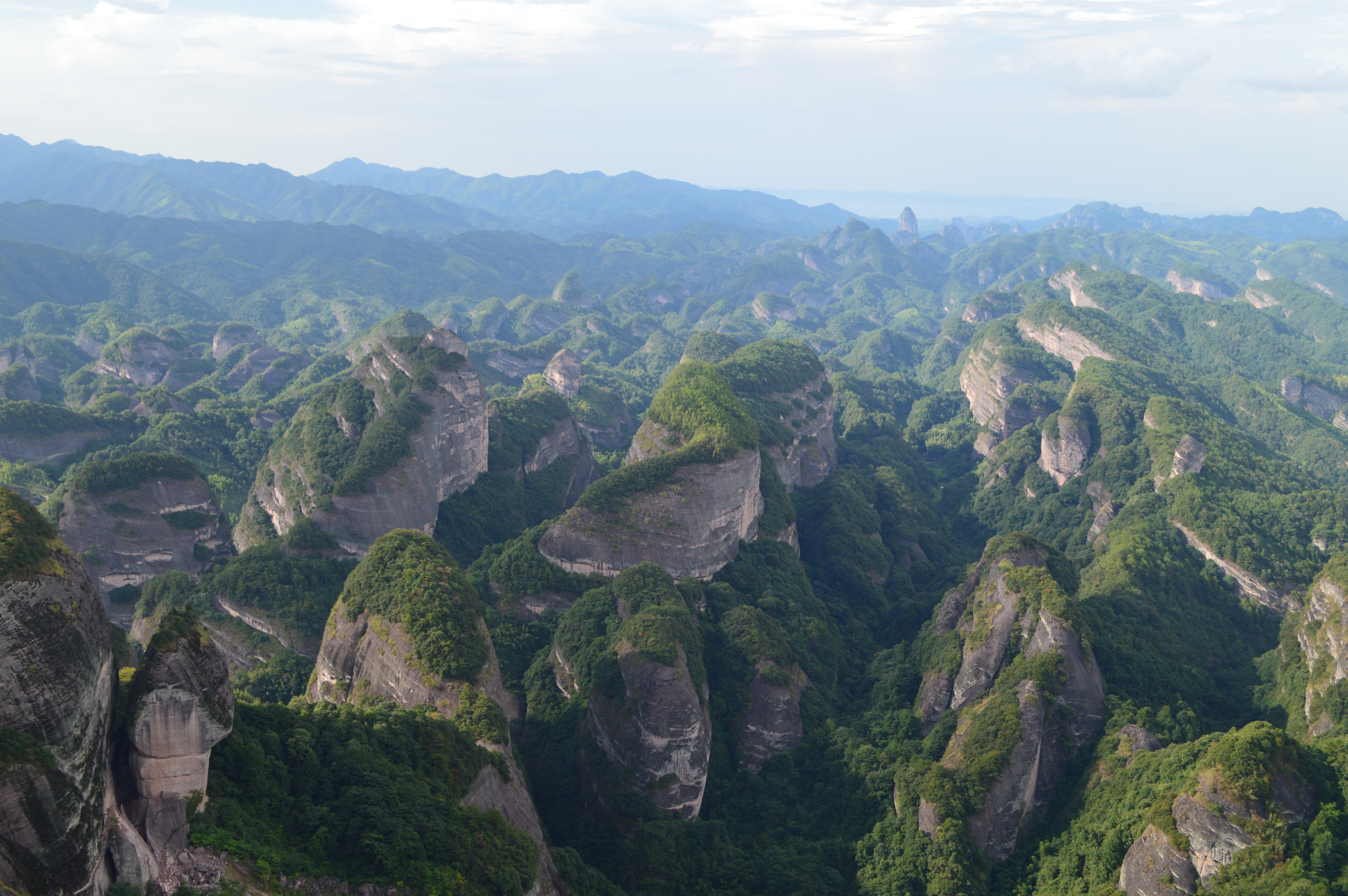
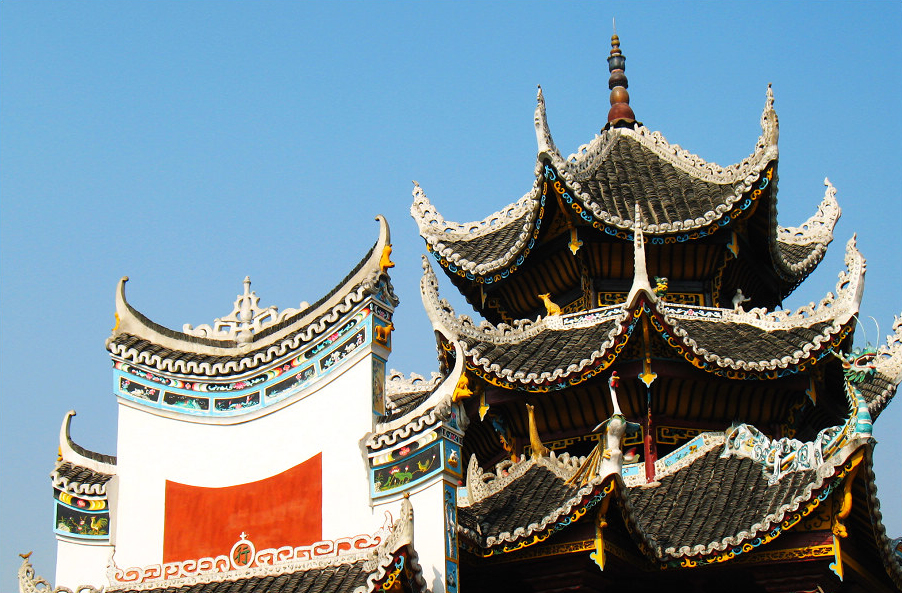
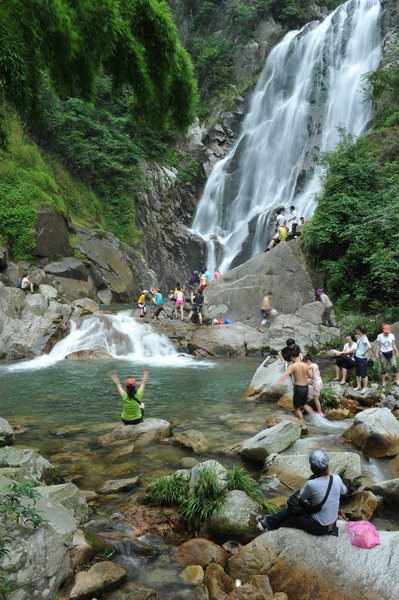
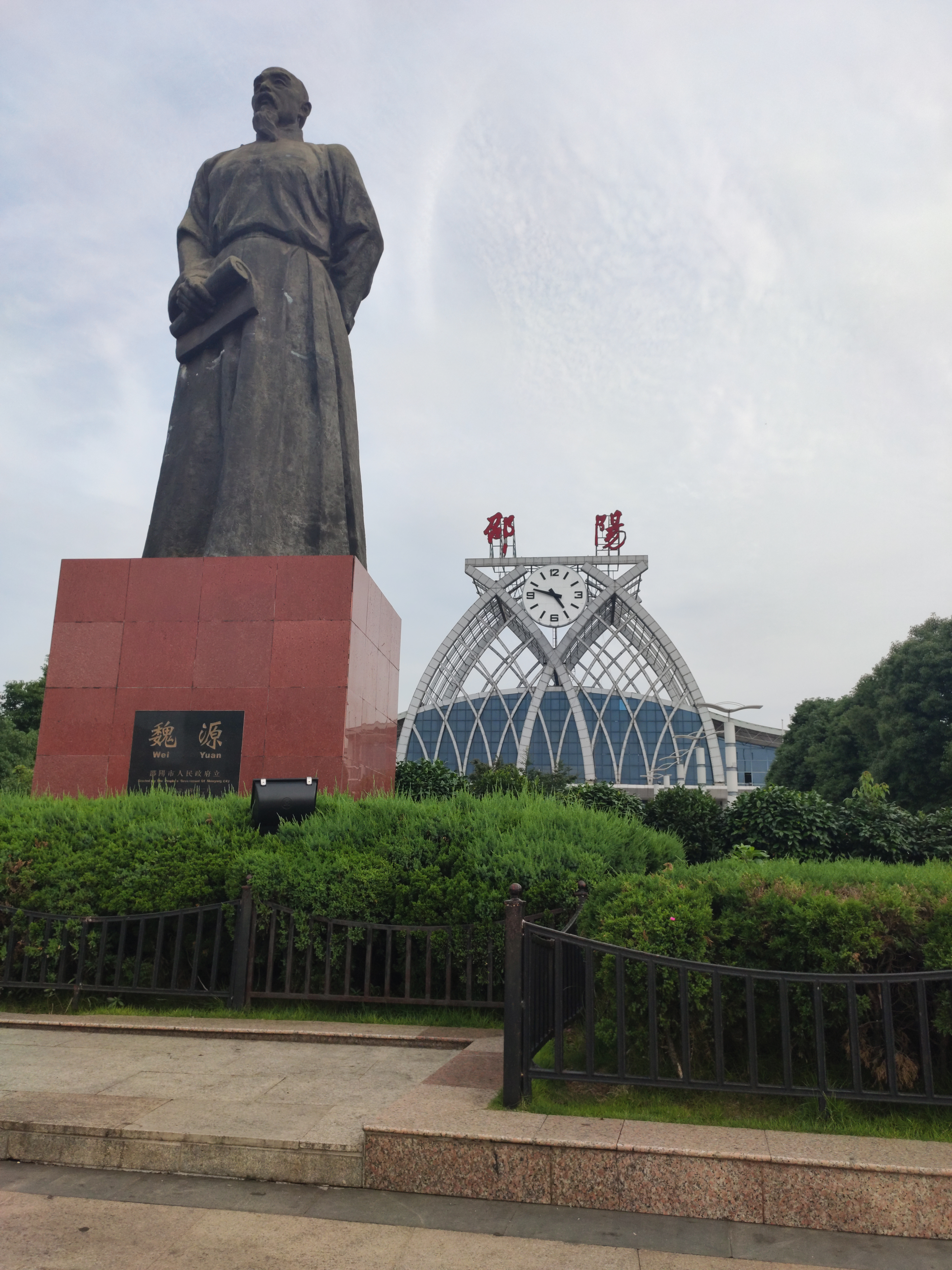
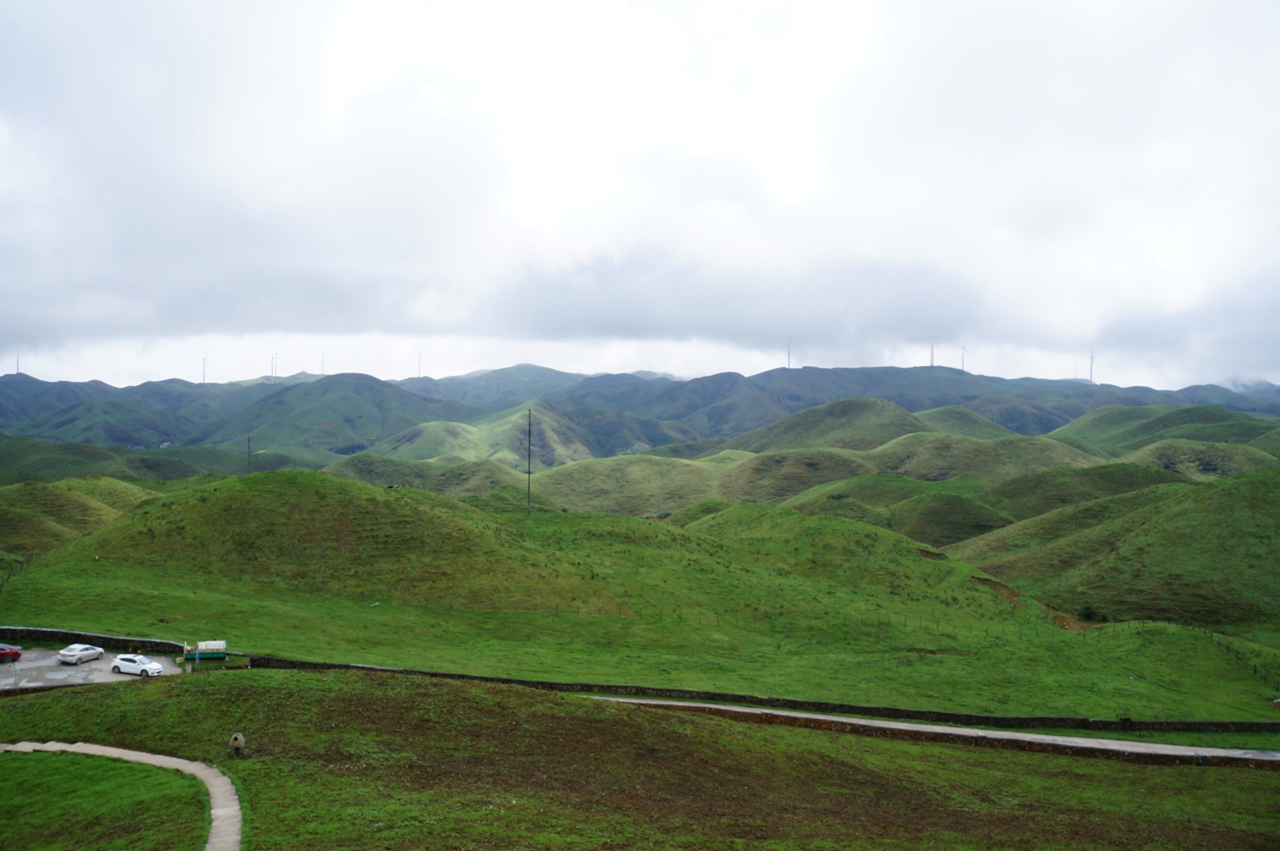
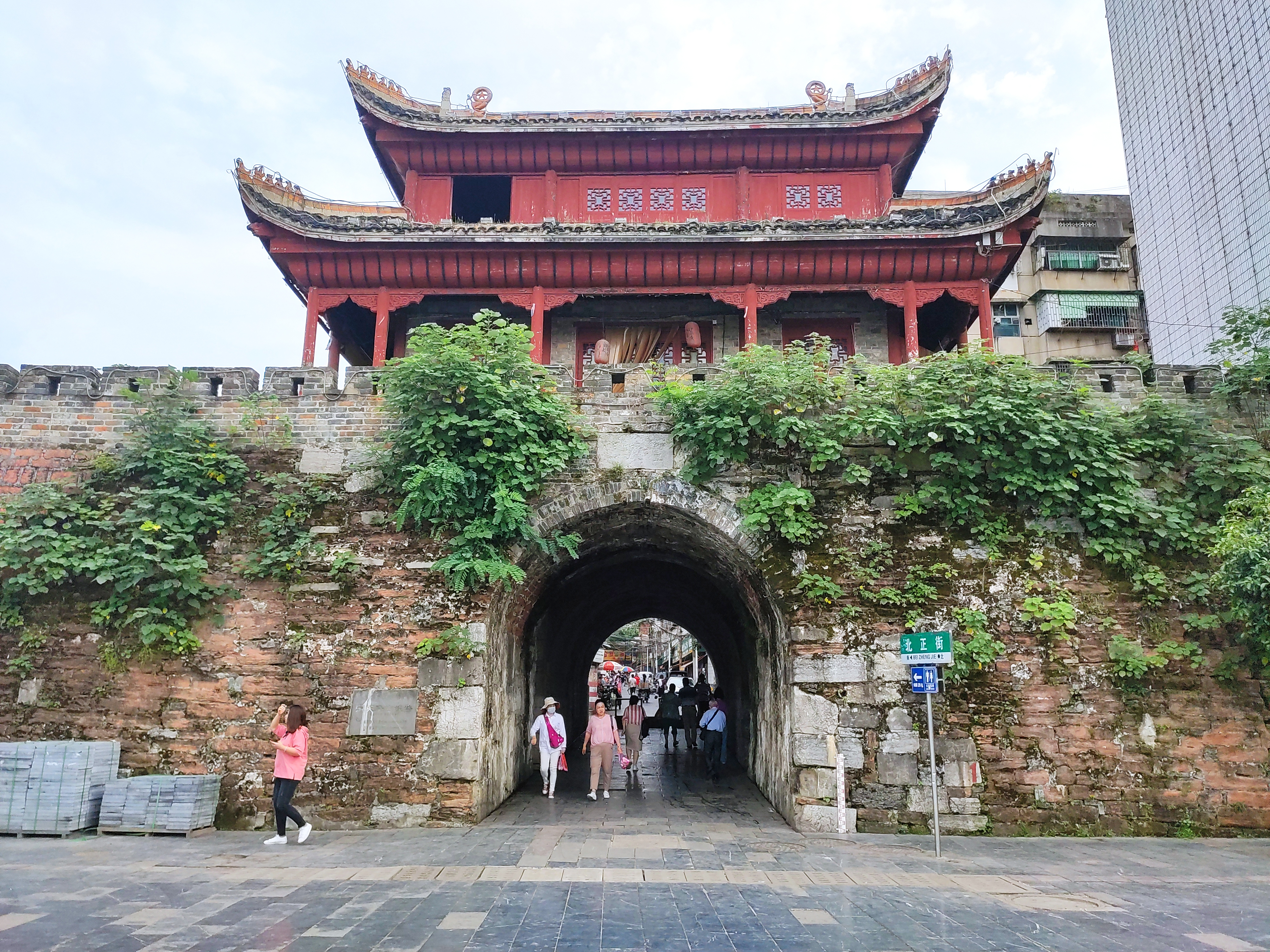
- Mount Lang Shuifu Temple Wangxi Falls (旺溪瀑布) Wei Yuan Statue Nanshan National Park Baoqing Wall

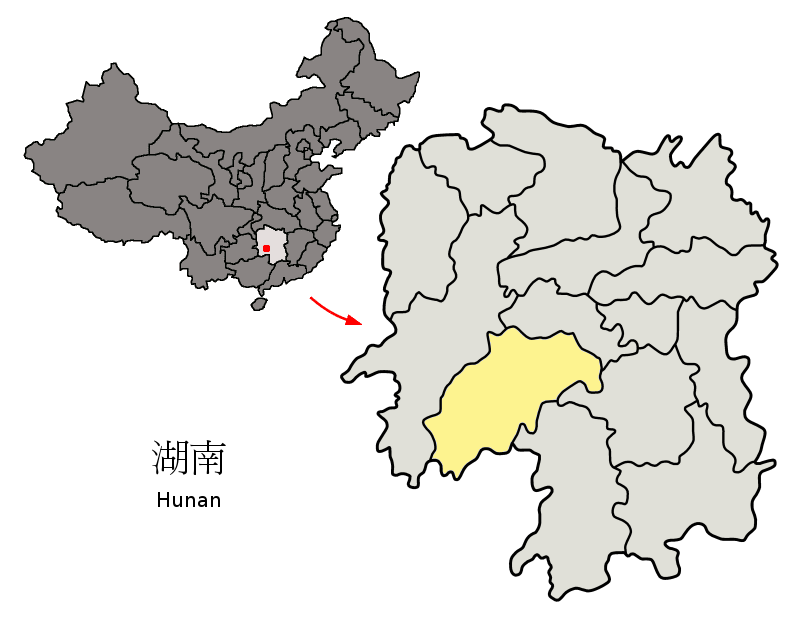
- Location of Shaoyang City jurisdiction in Hunan

- Location of the city centre in Hunan
- Coordinates (Shaoyang municipal government): 27°14′22″N 111°28′04″E
- Country: People's Republic of China
- Province: Hunan
- County-level divisions: 3 districts; 1 county-level city; 7 counties; 1 autonomous county
- Township-level divisions: 21 subdistricts; 97 towns; 78 townships; 21 ethnic townships
- Village-level divisions: 335 residential communities; 5,551 villages
- Municipal seat: Daxiang District

Area
  - Prefecture-level city: 20,829.63 km^{2} (8,042.37 sq mi)
  - Urban: 436.0 km^{2} (168.3 sq mi)
  - Metro: 2,199 km^{2} (849 sq mi)

Population (2020 census)
  - Prefecture-level city: 6,563,520
  - Density: 315.105/km^{2} (816.118/sq mi)
  - Urban: 802,230
  - Urban density: 1,840/km^{2} (4,766/sq mi)
  - Metro: 1,415,173
  - Metro density: 643.6/km^{2} (1,667/sq mi)

GDP
  - Prefecture-level city: CN¥ 259.9 trillion US$ 38.6 billion
  - Per capita: CN¥ 31,816; US$ 4,731
- Time zone: UTC+8 (China Standard)
- Postal code: 422000
- Area code: 0739
- ISO 3166 code: CN-HN-05
- Licence plate prefixes: 湘E
- Administrative division code: 430500

Shaoyang (simplified Chinese: 邵阳; traditional Chinese: 邵陽; pinyin: Shàoyáng), formerly named Baoqing (Paoking) (Chinese: 宝庆), is a prefecture-level city in southwestern Hunan province, China, bordering Guangxi to the south. It has a history of 2500 years and remains an important commercial and transportation city in Hunan. As of the 2020 Chinese census, its total population was 6,563,520 inhabitants, of whom 1,415,173 lived in the built-up (or metro) area made of three urban districts and Xinshao County largely conurbated.

One of the major forest areas in Hunan, Shaoyang has a forest coverage of 42.7%. The 23,000,000-acre (93,000 km^{2}) NanShan Pastures is one of the biggest in South Central China and provide dairy products and meat for Hunanese.

Shaoyang is home to Shaoyang University. The school is composed of the former Shaoyang Normal College and Shaoyang College.

The Shaoyang dialect of Lou Shao group of dialects of Xiang is generally spoken here.

== History ==
During the later Spring and Autumn period, official Bai Shan (白善) of Chu used to construct a city named Baigong (白公城) in today Shaoyang. After the First emperor of Qin reunited China, Shaoyang was under jurisdiction of Changsha Commandery, one of thirty-six Commandery in the empire. Under the Eastern Han dynasty, Shaoyang was administered by Linling Commandery. During the Three Kingdoms era, northern part of Linling including today Shaoyang city was divided from it and designated new Zhaoling commandery (昭陵). Following Western Jin reunited Wu in 280 (or first year of Taikang era), emperor Wu changed the Commandery's name Zhaoling to Shaoling (邵陵) to avoid taboo of his father (Sima Zhao). Under the Southern Song period, Shao Prefecture was renamed and promotedshaoqing Baoqing-fu by Lizong, whom used to take charge of Shao Prefecture defender (邵州防御使) when he was prince. The term "Baoqing" was used until 17 years of Republic of China (1928), when it was renamed Shaoyang County. After communists won the Chinese Civil War, Shaoyang city was established in 1950.

== Climate ==
Shaoyang has a monsoon-influenced, four-season humid subtropical climate (Köppen Cfa), with cool, damp winters, and hot, humid summers. Winter begins relatively dry but not sunny and becomes progressively damper and cloudier; spring brings both the most frequent and heaviest rain of the year. Summer is comparatively sunny, while autumn is somewhat dry. The monthly 24-hour average temperatures ranges from 5.2 °C (41.4 °F) in January to 28.2 °C (82.8 °F) in July, while the annual mean is 17.05 °C (62.7 °F). The annual precipitation is about 1,340 mm (53 in).

Climate data for Shaoyang, elevation 311 m (1,020 ft), (1991–2020 normals, extremes 1971–2010)
Month	Jan	Feb	Mar	Apr	May	Jun	Jul	Aug	Sep	Oct	Nov	Dec	Year
Record high °C (°F)	24.3 (75.7)	28.9 (84.0)	35.9 (96.6)	34.5 (94.1)	36.2 (97.2)	37.4 (99.3)	39.5 (103.1)	38.6 (101.5)	37.1 (98.8)	35.3 (95.5)	33.0 (91.4)	24.6 (76.3)	39.5 (103.1)
Mean daily maximum °C (°F)	9.0 (48.2)	11.7 (53.1)	16.0 (60.8)	22.4 (72.3)	26.7 (80.1)	29.6 (85.3)	32.8 (91.0)	32.5 (90.5)	28.8 (83.8)	23.3 (73.9)	17.8 (64.0)	11.7 (53.1)	21.9 (71.3)
Daily mean °C (°F)	5.6 (42.1)	7.9 (46.2)	11.8 (53.2)	17.7 (63.9)	22.2 (72.0)	25.5 (77.9)	28.2 (82.8)	27.6 (81.7)	24.0 (75.2)	18.7 (65.7)	13.2 (55.8)	7.7 (45.9)	17.5 (63.5)
Mean daily minimum °C (°F)	3.1 (37.6)	5.2 (41.4)	8.8 (47.8)	14.3 (57.7)	18.7 (65.7)	22.4 (72.3)	24.6 (76.3)	24.1 (75.4)	20.6 (69.1)	15.3 (59.5)	9.8 (49.6)	4.7 (40.5)	14.3 (57.7)
Record low °C (°F)	−10.5 (13.1)	−6.0 (21.2)	−0.6 (30.9)	2.2 (36.0)	9.6 (49.3)	14.1 (57.4)	18.1 (64.6)	18.5 (65.3)	12.2 (54.0)	3.2 (37.8)	−1.6 (29.1)	−6.9 (19.6)	−10.5 (13.1)
Average precipitation mm (inches)	67.7 (2.67)	70.7 (2.78)	132.7 (5.22)	136.2 (5.36)	181.9 (7.16)	203.8 (8.02)	147.4 (5.80)	124.1 (4.89)	63.3 (2.49)	68.2 (2.69)	70.2 (2.76)	51.7 (2.04)	1,317.9 (51.88)
Average precipitation days (≥ 0.1 mm)	14.5	14.1	17.9	16.3	15.9	14.8	11.0	11.8	8.2	10.1	10.9	11.0	156.5
Average snowy days	4.9	3.2	0.6	0	0	0	0	0	0	0	0	1.5	10.2
Average relative humidity (%)	78	79	80	79	79	82	76	76	75	75	76	74	77
Mean monthly sunshine hours	60.4	61.3	79.7	111.4	135.8	139.5	224.5	204.8	149.2	124.5	114.8	93.4	1,499.3
Percentage possible sunshine	18	19	21	29	32	34	53	51	41	35	36	29	33
Source 1: China Meteorological Administration
Source 2: Weather China

== Administrative divisions ==
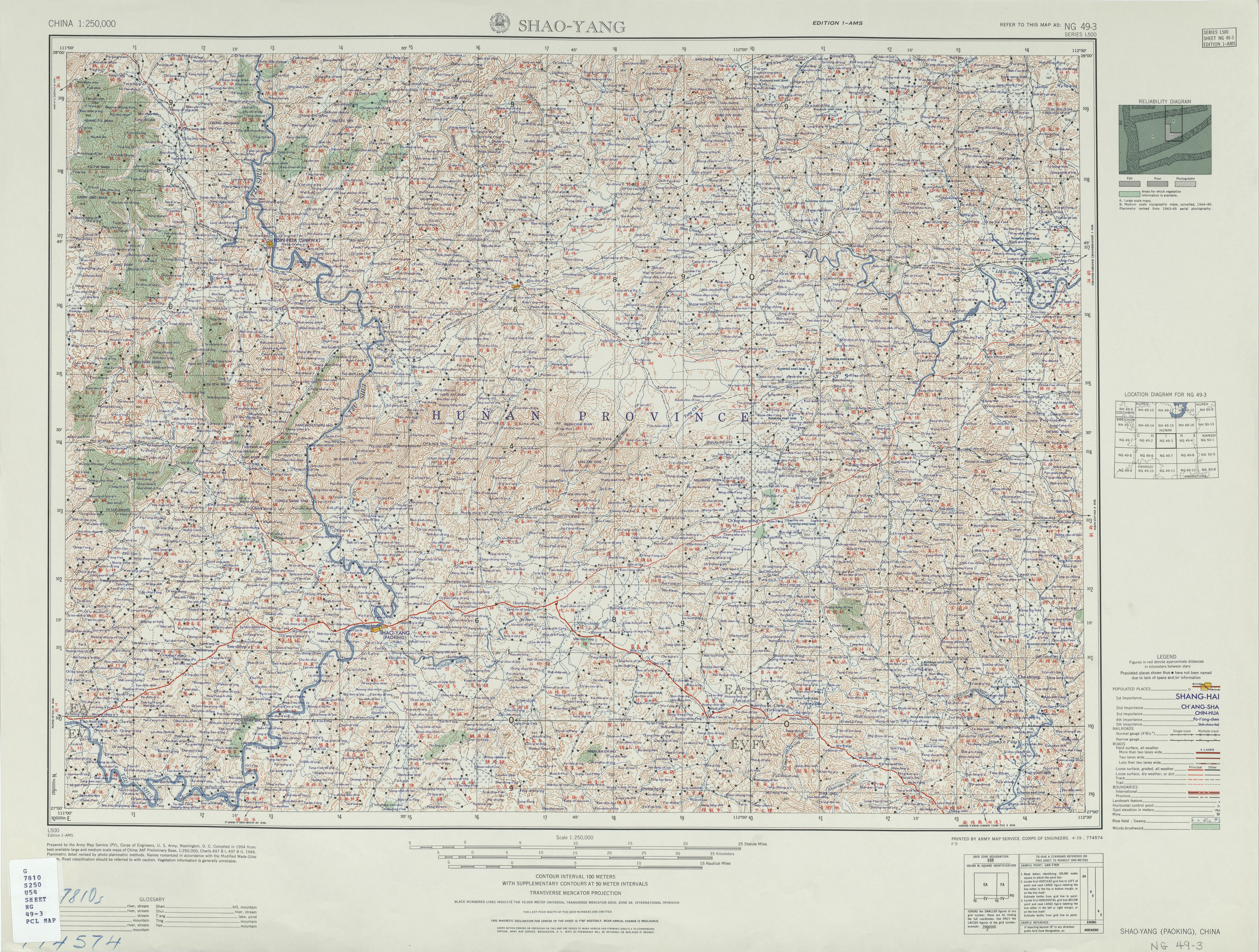
Map including Shaoyang (labeled as SHAO-YANG (PAOKING) (Walled) 邵陽) (AMS, 1954)

Shaoyang administers three districts, two county-level cities, six counties, and one autonomous county.

Districts:

- Shuangqing District (双清区)
- Daxiang District (大祥区)
- Beita District (北塔区)

County-level City:

- Wugang City (武冈市)
- Shaodong city (邵东市)

Counties:

- Shaoyang County (邵阳县)
- Xinshao County (新邵县)
- Longhui County (隆回县)
- Dongkou County (洞口县)
- Suining County (绥宁县)
- Xinning County (新宁县)

Autonomous county:

- Chengbu Miao Autonomous County (城步苗族自治县)

Map
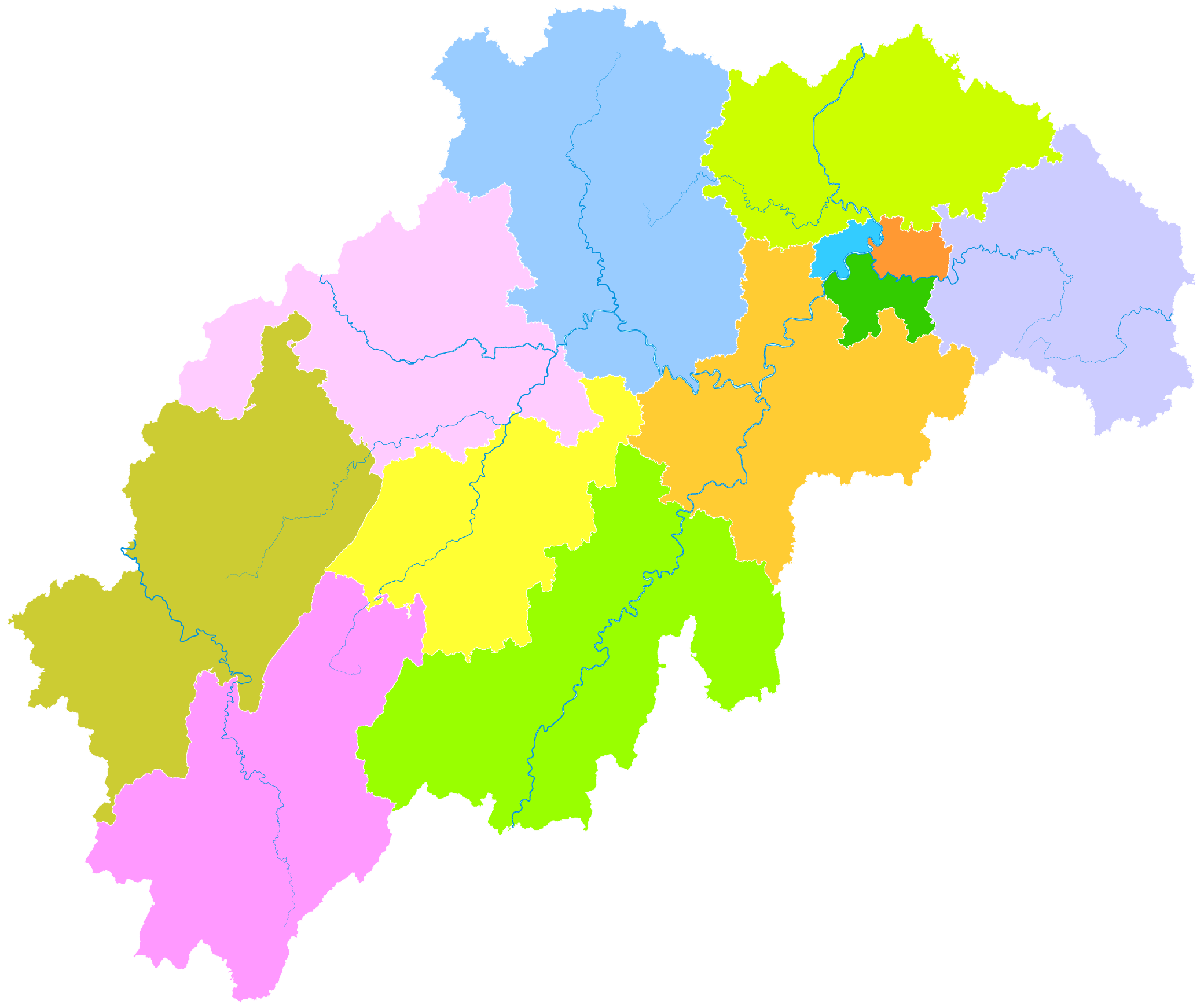

=== Demographics ===
According to the Sixth National Census in 2010, Shaoyang's permanent residence population of 7,071,741 ranked it 2nd out of 14 prefecture-level divisions of Hunan; the male-female ratio was 107.95 to 100. Educational attainment levels were as follows: 4.49% bachelor's or higher, 60.01% middle school (初中) or higher, and the illiteracy rate was 3.24%. There were 1,950,605 households in which 6,913,913 resided, forming 97.77% of the provincial population (hukou) and resulting in an average of 3.54 persons/household. Age distribution was as follows: 1,512,664 (21.39%) ≤14 years, 4,862,468 (68.76%) 15−64 years, 696,609 (9.85%) 65+ years.

Shaoyang administrative and population data
Division	Area (km^{2})	Permanent residents (2010 Census)	Hukou permits (late 2009)	Divisions					
Division	Area (km^{2})	Permanent residents (2010 Census)	Hukou permits (late 2009)	Subdistricts	Towns	Townships	Including ethnic townships	Residential communities	Villages
Shaoying	20,829.63	7,071,741	7,705,957	21	97	99	21	335	5551
Shuangqing District	137.08	307,980	270,458	6	2	4		54	63
Daxiang District	214.66	340,605	309,752	6	2	4		44	81
Beita District	84.39	104,609	87,714	2		3		14	40
Shaodong city	1,776.38	896,625	1,260,966	3	16	9		33	977
Xinshao County	1,762.97	743,073	764,905		11	4		28	652
Shaoyang County	1,996.88	915,600	999,148		12	10		23	633
Longhui County	2,871.16	1,095,392	1,156,917		15	11	2	41	964
Dongkou County	2184.01	770,473	833,003		10	12	3	23	566
Suining County	2,898.89	351,139	363,740		6	19	14	14	348
Xinning County	2,751.31	560,742	607,055		9	9	2	15	474
Chengbu Miao Autonomous County	2,619.76	250,633	267,921		6	5		21	271
Wugang City	1,532.15	734,870	784,378	4	8	9		25	482

== Government ==
The current CPC Party Secretary of Shaoyang is Gong Congmi and the current mayor is Liu Shiqing.

== Transportation ==
=== Railway ===
Shaoyang has four main railway station: Shaoyang Railway Station (邵阳火车站) (Fast Train, K and Highspeed train, G), Old Shaoyang Railway Station (邵阳北老火车站) (Old, North, Freight), Shaodong railway station (Fast Train, K and Highspeed train, G) and Shaoyang North railway station, in Xinshao County (Highspeed train, G and D). The Loudi–Shaoyang railway and Shanghai–Kunming high-speed railway pass through Shaoyang.

=== Airport ===
Shaoyang Wugang Airport was opened on 28 June 2017. It is located 9 kilometres (5.6 mi) north of Wugang, a county-level city under the administration of Shaoyang, and 100 kilometres (62 mi) from the urban center of Shaoyang.

The airport has a 2,600-meter runway and a 3,000-square-meter terminal building. It is projected to handle 250,000 passengers and 500 tons of cargo annually by 2020.

== Economy ==
2011 Shaoyang GDP figures (GDP in millions CNY/USD; per capita GDP in CNY)
Division	RMB	USD	Purchasing power (USD)	Growth (%)	Percentage (%)	Per capita GDP
Shaoying	90,723	14,046	21,740	13.2	100	12,797
City proper	18,308	2,835	4,387		20.18	
Shuangqing District	8,175.09	1,265.73	1,959.00	12.6	9.01	
Daxiang District	8,063.65	1,248.47	1,932.29	15.2	8.89	
Beita District	2,069.27	320.38	495.86	15.1	2.28	19,698
Outlying	76,358	11,822	18,298		84.17	
Shaodong County	20,220.00	3,130.61	4,845.32	14.4	22.29	22,299
Xinshao County	7,429.81	1,150.34	1,780.41	13.6	8.19	9,998
Shaoyang County	8,108.55	1,255.43	1,943.05	12.2	8.94	7,796
Longhui County	9,332.00	1,444.85	2,236.23	11.6	10.29	8,499
Dongkou County	9,012.00	1,395.31	2,159.55	12.6	9.93	11,784
Suining County	5,018.45	776.99	1,202.57	12.2	5.53	
Xinning County	5,307.47	821.74	1,271.83	11.7	5.85	9,425
Chengbu County	2,320.63	359.30	556.09	11.5	2.56	9,238
Wugang City	7,932.57	1,228.18	1,900.88	13.8	8.74	10,746

Although it is, by 2010 Census permanent resident population, the second-largest prefecture-level division of Hunan, its GDP (4.62% of provincial output) places it ninth within the province, making it an archetypal example of a large-population, relatively backwards-economy city. The GDP per capita of 12,797 CNY is the lowest in the province, and is only 42.9% of the provincial average, 36.5% of the national average, and 78% of even Guizhou's corresponding figure. Primary, secondary, and tertiary sectors respectively accounted for 23.9%, 38.2%, and 37.9% of the economy.

== Noted residents ==
- Tsiang Tingfu, historian and diplomat
- Wei Yuan, late Qing scholar
- He Luting, composer
- Cai E, revolutionary leader
- Liao Yaoxiang, high-ranking Kuomintang general in World War II
- Li Wangyang, labour rights activist whose "suicide" was allegedly staged by the local police
- Zhou Shen, singer-songwriter
- Tang Kai, first ever male Chinese world champion in mixed martial arts history
- George H. Pearson, founder and manager of Shaoyang Hospital from 1920 to 1951
- Zhang Jingyi, actress and model
- Shen Yue, actress-singer and model
- Fu Jing, actress-singer and former member of Rocket Girls 101

== Twin cities ==
- Saratov, Russia
