= List of airport rail link systems =

This is a list of airport rail link systems which connect airports with cities in various countries.

== High-speed rail and inter-city rail ==
=== Asia ===
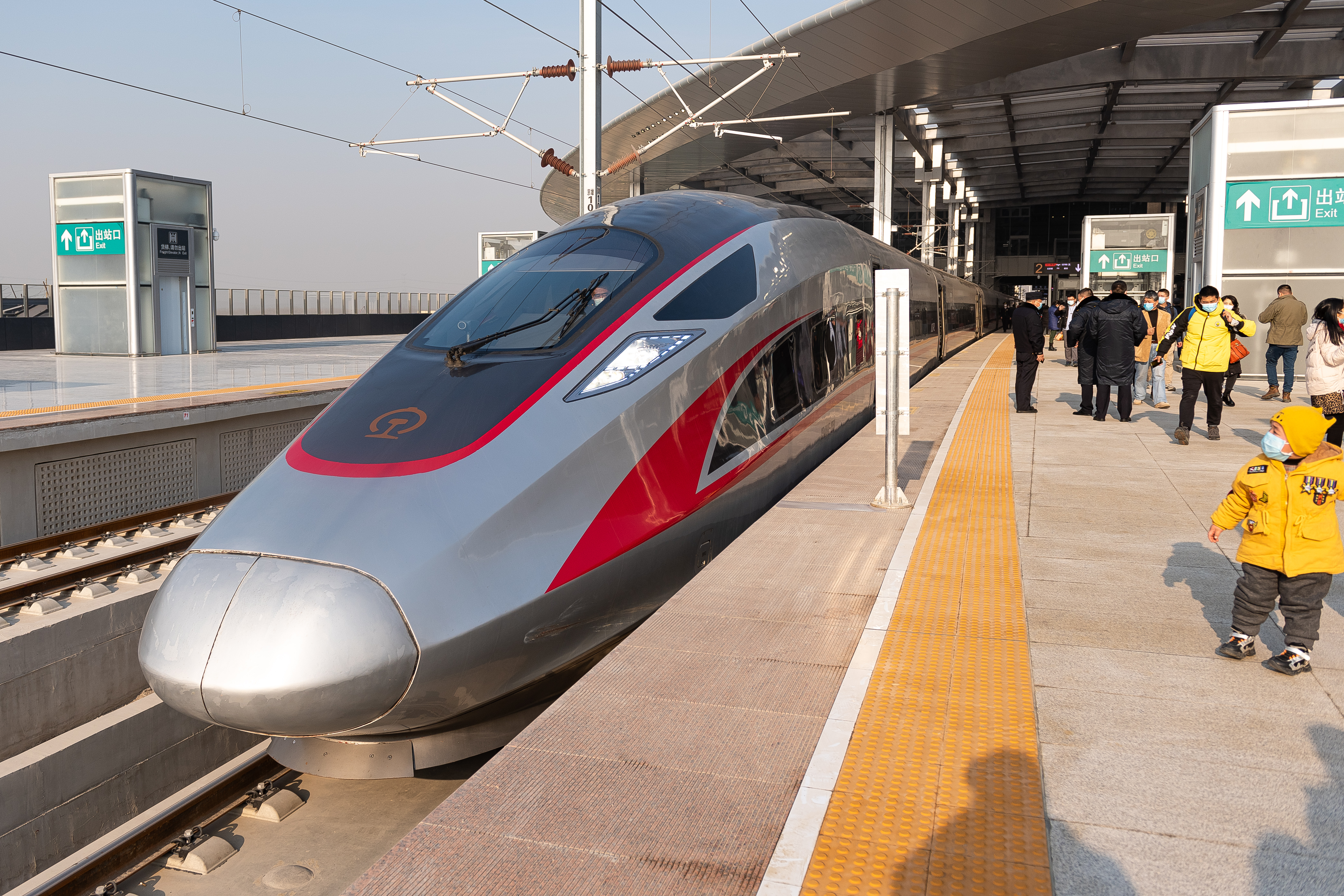
China Railway, serving Beijing Daxing International Airport

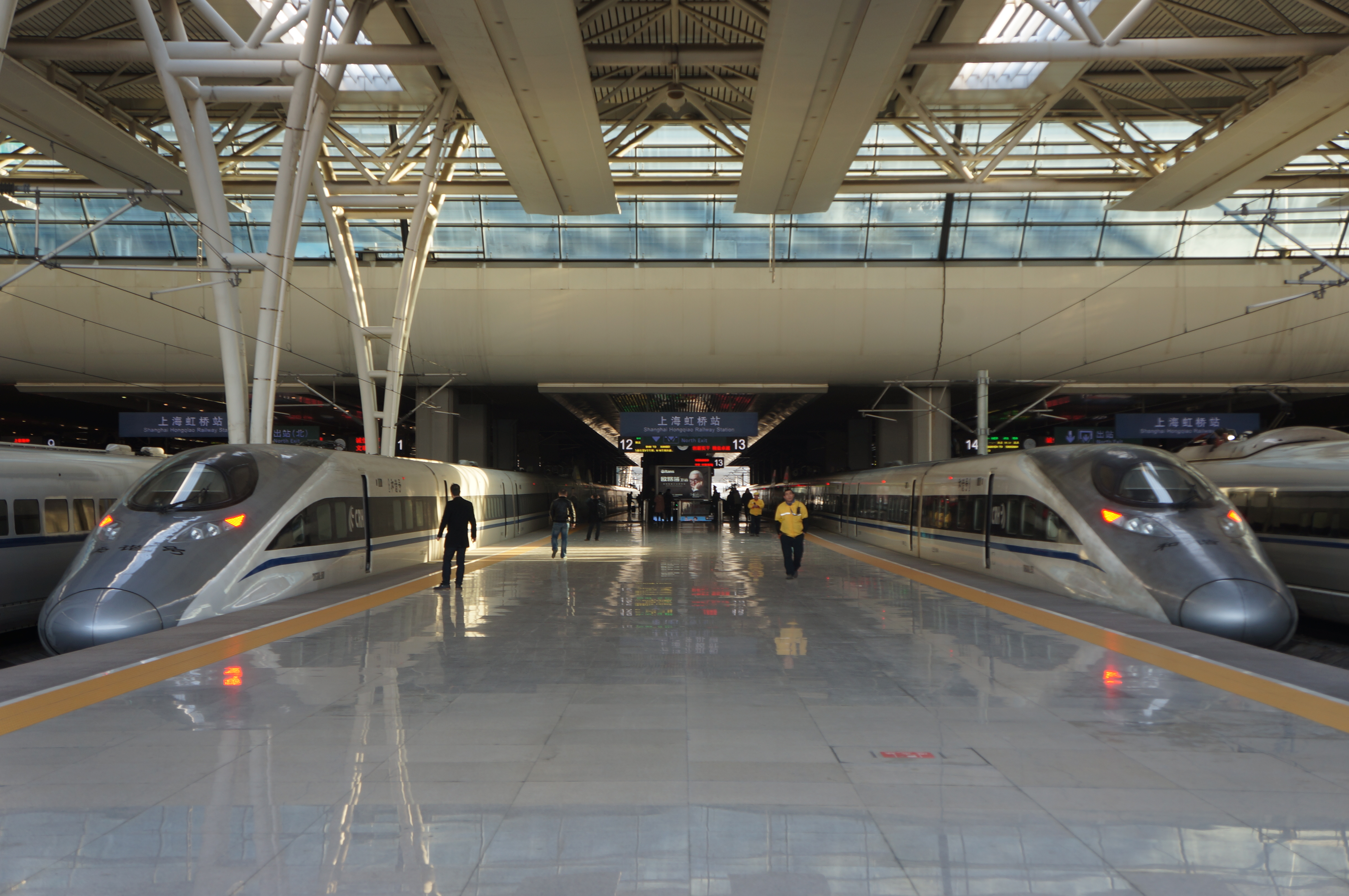
China Railway, serving Shanghai Hongqiao International Airport

Country	City	Airport	Rail link	Station name
Bangladesh	Dhaka	Hazrat Shahjalal International Airport	Bangladesh Railway	Dhaka Biman Bandar
China	Beijing	Beijing Daxing International Airport	China Railway	Daxing Airport
China	Changchun	Changchun Longjia International Airport	China Railway	Longjia
China	Chengdu	Chengdu Tianfu International Airport	China Railway	Tianfu Airport
China	Chengdu	Chengdu Shuangliu International Airport	China Railway	Shuangliu Airport
China	Chongqing	Chongqing Jiangbei International Airport	China Railway	Jiangbei Airport
China	Guiyang	Guiyang Longdongbao International Airport	China Railway	Longdongbao
China	Haikou	Haikou Meilan International Airport	China Railway	Meilan
China	Jieyang	Jieyang Chaoshan International Airport	China Railway	Jieyang Airport
China	Kunming	Kunming Changshui International Airport	China Railway	Changshui Airport
China	Lanzhou	Lanzhou Zhongchuan International Airport	China Railway	Zhongchuanjichangdong
China	Nanning	Nanning Wuxu International Airport	China Railway	Wuxu Airport
China	Qingdao	Qingdao Jiaodong International Airport	China Railway	Qingdao Airport
China	Sanya	Sanya Phoenix International Airport	China Railway	Phoenix Airport
China	Shanghai	Shanghai Hongqiao International Airport	China Railway	Shanghai Hongqiao
China	Turpan	Turpan Jiaohe Airport	China Railway	Turpan North
China	Wuhan	Wuhan Tianhe International Airport	China Railway	Tianhe Airport
China	Xingyi	Xingyi Wanfenglin Airport	China Railway	Xingyi South
China	Yinchuan	Yinchuan Hedong International Airport	China Railway	Hedong Airport
China	Zhengzhou	Zhengzhou Xinzheng International Airport	China Railway	Xinzheng Airport
China	Zhuhai	Zhuhai Jinwan Airport	China Railway	Zhuhai Airport
Israel	Tel Aviv	Ben Gurion International Airport	Israel Railways	Ben Gurion Airport
Saudi Arabia	Jeddah	King Abdulaziz International Airport	Saudi Arabia Railways	King Abdulaziz International Airport
Thailand	Bangkok	Don Mueang International Airport	State Railway of Thailand	Don Mueang

=== Europe ===
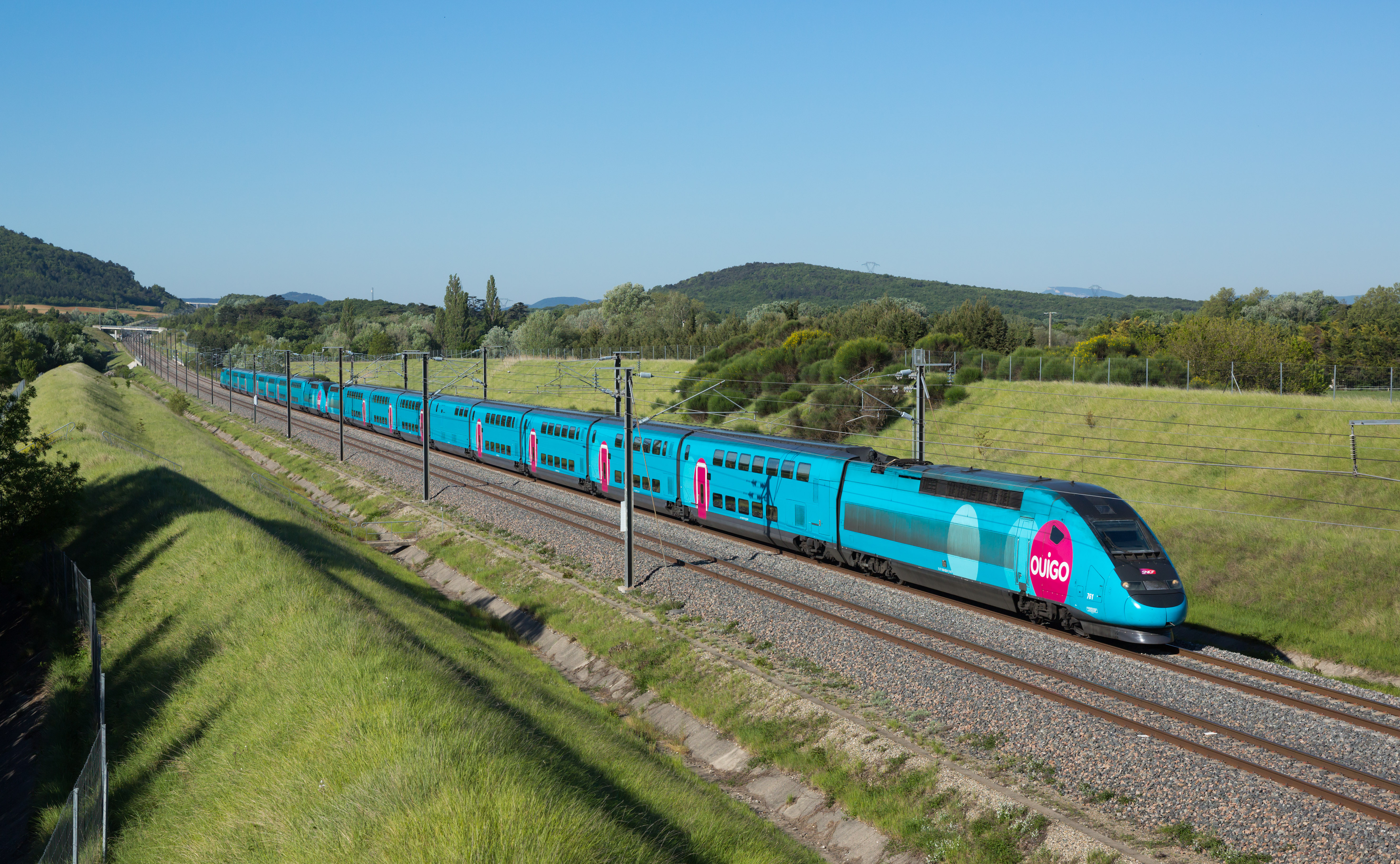
SNCF, serving Paris Charles de Gaulle Airport and Lyon Aéroport

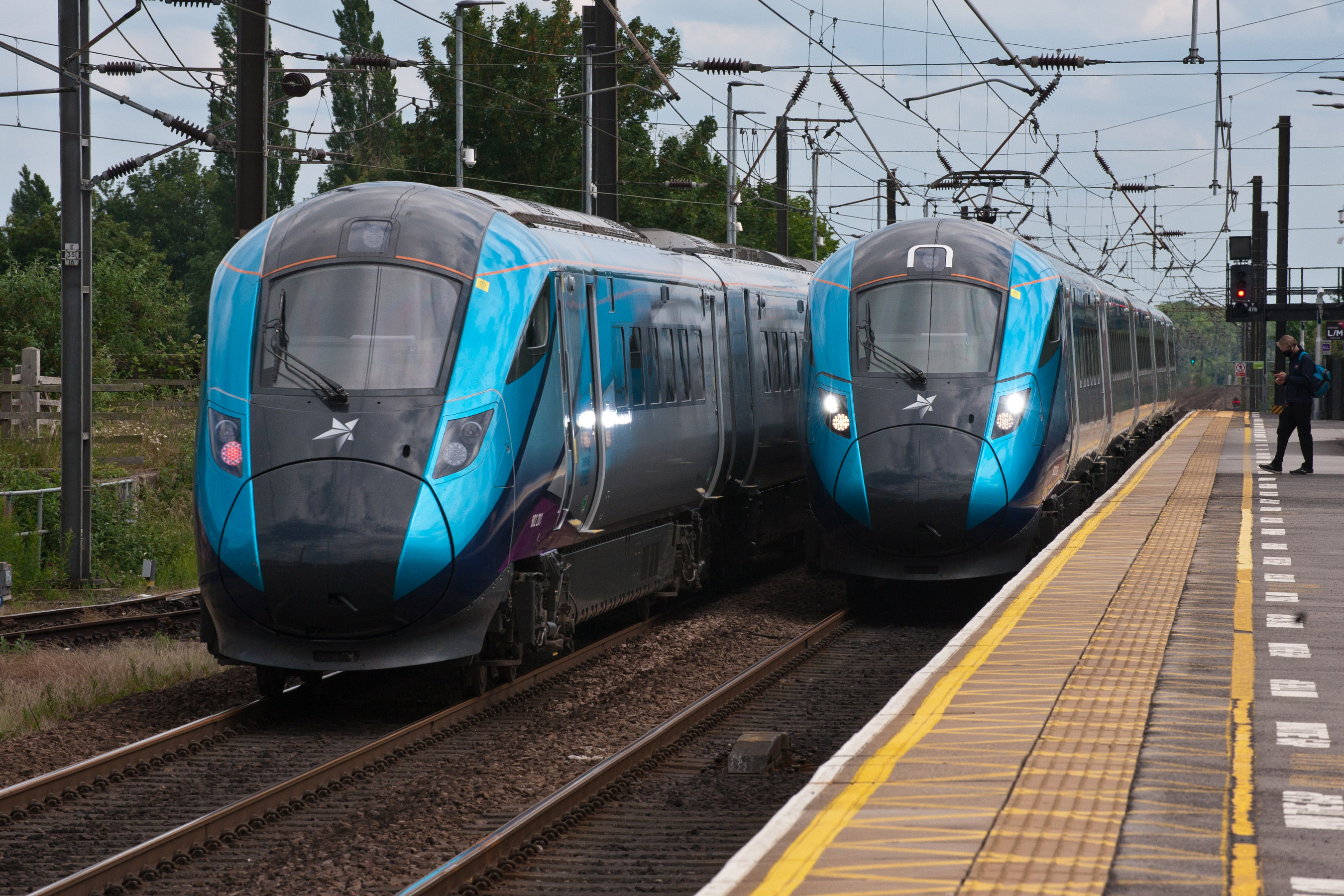
TransPennine Express, serving Manchester Airport

Country	City	Airport	Rail link	Station name
Austria	Vienna	Vienna Airport	ÖBB	Flughafen Wien
Belgium	Brussels	Brussels Airport	NS	Brussels Airport-Zaventem
Belgium	Brussels	Brussels Airport	SNCB	Brussels Airport-Zaventem
Denmark	Aalborg	Aalborg Airport	DSB	Aalborg Lufthavn
Denmark	Aalborg	Aalborg Airport	NJ	Aalborg Lufthavn
Denmark	Copenhagen	Copenhagen Airport	DSB	Københavns Lufthavn
Denmark	Copenhagen	Copenhagen Airport	SJ	Københavns Lufthavn
France	Lyon	Lyon Aéroport	SNCF Voyageurs	Lyon Saint-Exupéry TGV
France	Lyon	Lyon Aéroport	Trenitalia France	Lyon Saint-Exupéry TGV
France	Paris	Paris Charles de Gaulle Airport	Eurostar	Aéroport Charles de Gaulle 2 TGV
France	Paris	Paris Charles de Gaulle Airport	SNCF Voyageurs	Aéroport Charles de Gaulle 2 TGV
Germany	Berlin	Berlin Brandenburg Airport	DB	Flughafen BER
Germany	Cologne	Cologne Bonn Airport	DB	Köln/Bonn Flughafen
Germany	Frankfurt	Frankfurt Airport	DB	Frankfurt am Main Flughafen Fernbahnhof
Germany	Leipzig	Leipzig/Halle Airport	DB	Flughafen Leipzig/Halle
Italy	Rome	Rome Fiumicino Airport	Trenitalia	Fiumicino Aeroporto
Netherlands	Amsterdam	Amsterdam Airport Schiphol	Arriva	Schiphol Airport
Netherlands	Amsterdam	Amsterdam Airport Schiphol	Eurostar	Schiphol Airport
Netherlands	Amsterdam	Amsterdam Airport Schiphol	NS	Schiphol Airport
Norway	Oslo	Oslo Airport	Flytoget	Oslo Airport (Gardermoen)
Norway	Oslo	Oslo Airport	SJ	Oslo Airport (Gardermoen)
Norway	Oslo	Oslo Airport	Vy	Oslo Airport (Gardermoen)
Sweden	Stockholm	Stockholm Arlanda Airport	SJ	Arlanda Central
Switzerland	Geneva	Genève Aéroport	SBB	Geneva Airport
Switzerland	Zürich	Zurich Airport	SBB	Zürich Flughafen
United Kingdom	Glasgow	Glasgow Prestwick Airport	ScotRail	Prestwick International Airport
United Kingdom	London	Gatwick Airport	Great Western Railway	Gatwick Airport
United Kingdom	London	Gatwick Airport	Southern	Gatwick Airport
United Kingdom	London	London Southend Airport	Greater Anglia	Southend Airport
United Kingdom	London	London Stansted Airport	CrossCountry	Stansted Airport
United Kingdom	London	London Stansted Airport	Greater Anglia	Stansted Airport
United Kingdom	Manchester	Manchester Airport	Northern	Manchester Airport
United Kingdom	Manchester	Manchester Airport	TransPennine Express	Manchester Airport
United Kingdom	Manchester	Manchester Airport	Transport for Wales	Manchester Airport
United Kingdom	Southampton	Southampton Airport	CrossCountry	Southampton Airport Parkway
United Kingdom	Southampton	Southampton Airport	Great Western Railway	Southampton Airport Parkway
United Kingdom	Southampton	Southampton Airport	South Western Railway	Southampton Airport Parkway
United Kingdom	Southampton	Southampton Airport	Southern	Southampton Airport Parkway

=== North America ===
Country	City	Airport	Rail link	Station name
Mexico	Chetumal	Aeropuerto Internacional de Chetumal	Tren Maya	Chetumal Aeropuerto
United States	Los Angeles	Hollywood Burbank Airport	Amtrak	Hollywood Burbank Airport
United States	Orlando	Orlando International Airport	Brightline	Orlando

== Regional rail and commuter rail ==
=== Africa ===
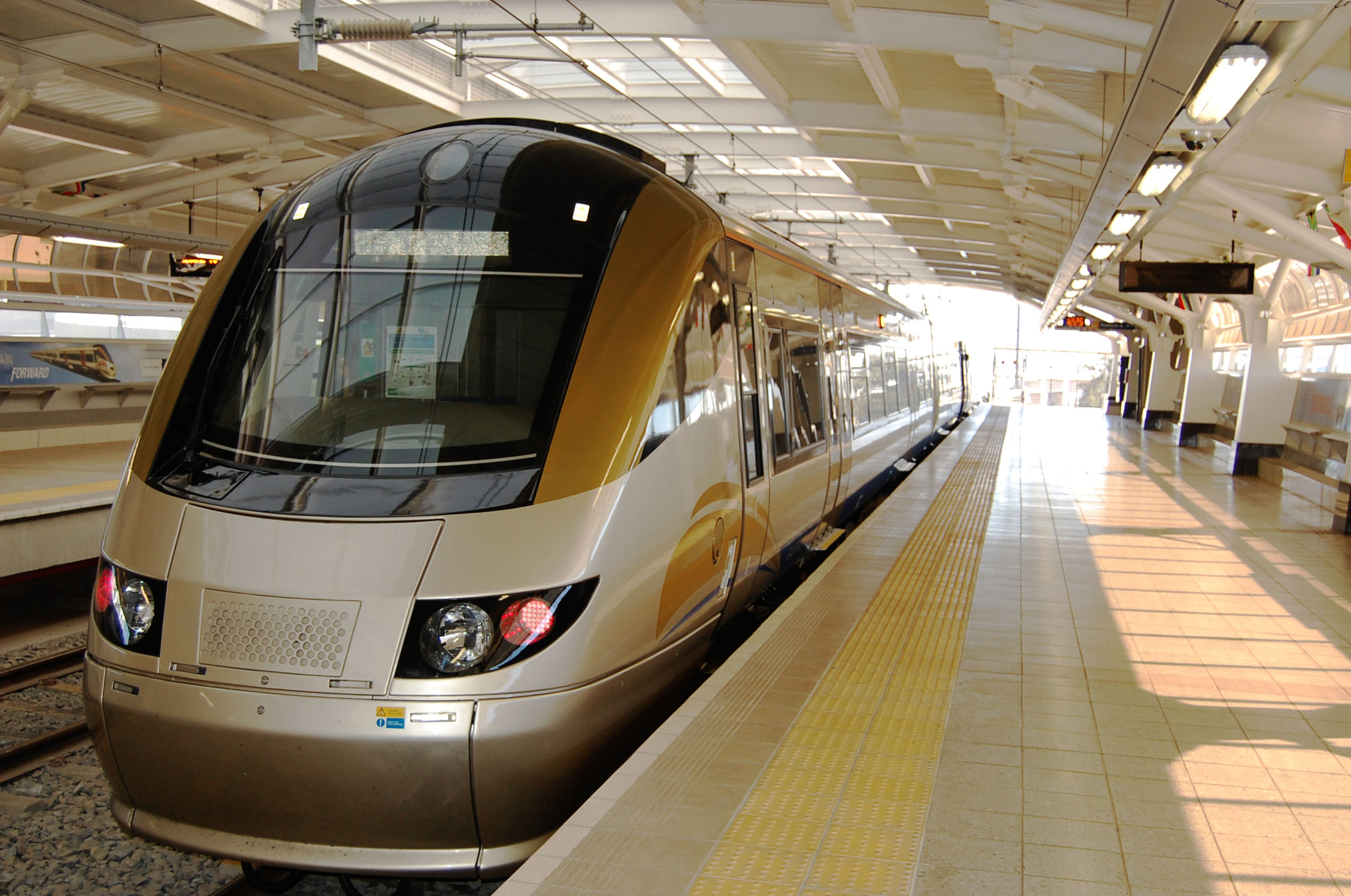
Gautrain, serving O. R. Tambo International Airport

Country	City	Airport	Rail link	Station name
Algeria	Algiers	Houari Boumediene International Airport	SNTF Algiers - Houari Boumediene Airport Line	Aéroport Houari Boumédiène
Morocco	Casablanca	Mohammed V International Airport	ONCF Al Bidaoui	Aéroport Mohammed V
Nigeria	Abuja	Nnamdi Azikiwe International Airport	Abuja Light Rail Yellow Line	Airport
Senegal	Dakar	Blaise Diagne International Airport	Train Express Régional	Aéroport international Blaise-Diagne
South Africa	Johannesburg	O. R. Tambo International Airport	Gautrain Airport Service	O.R. Tambo

=== Asia ===
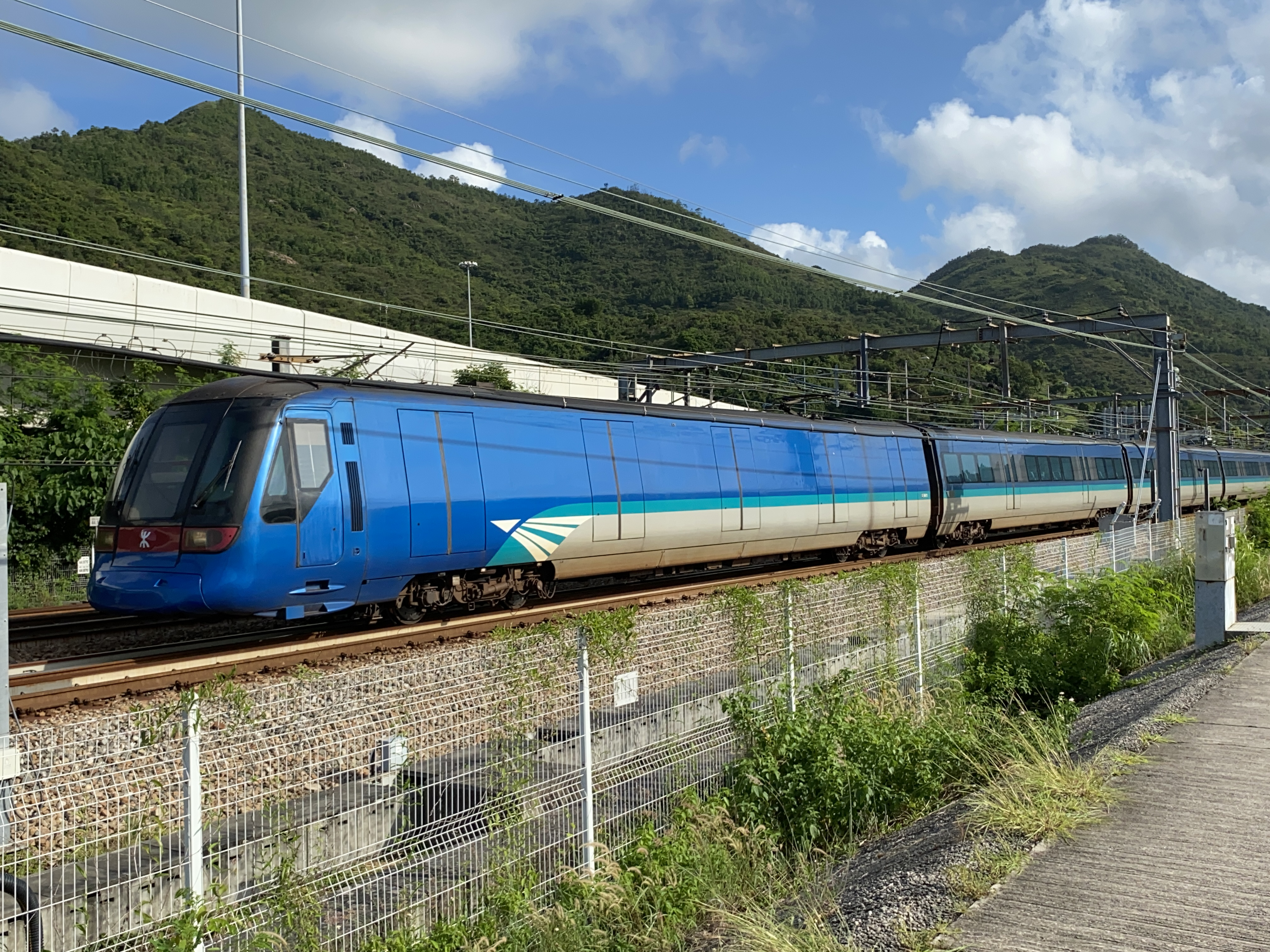
MTR, serving Hong Kong International Airport

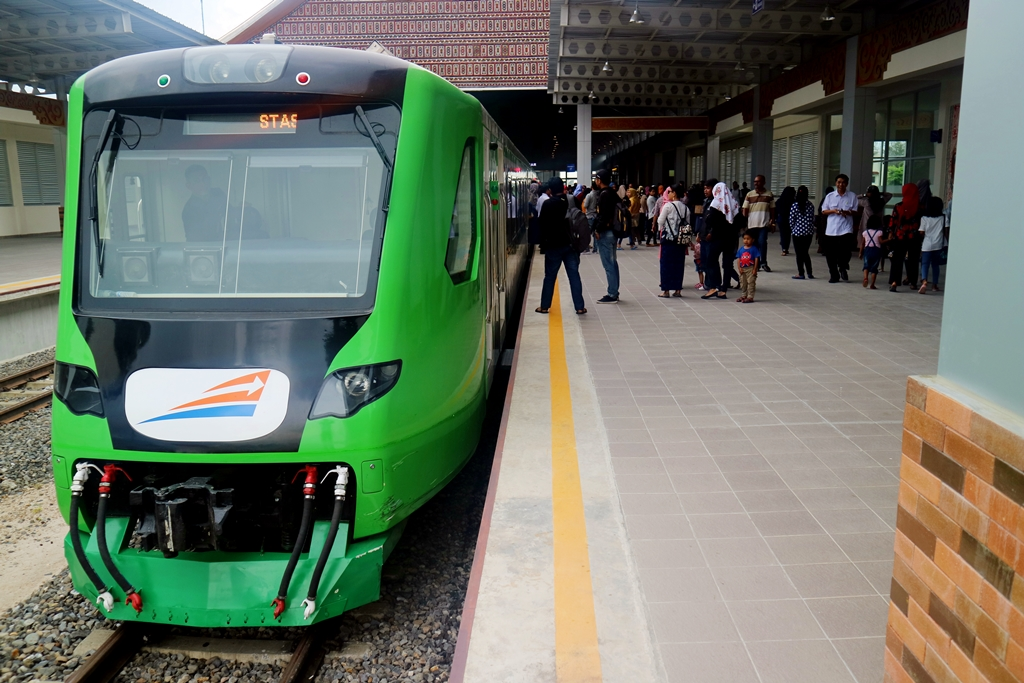
KAI, serving Minangkabau International Airport

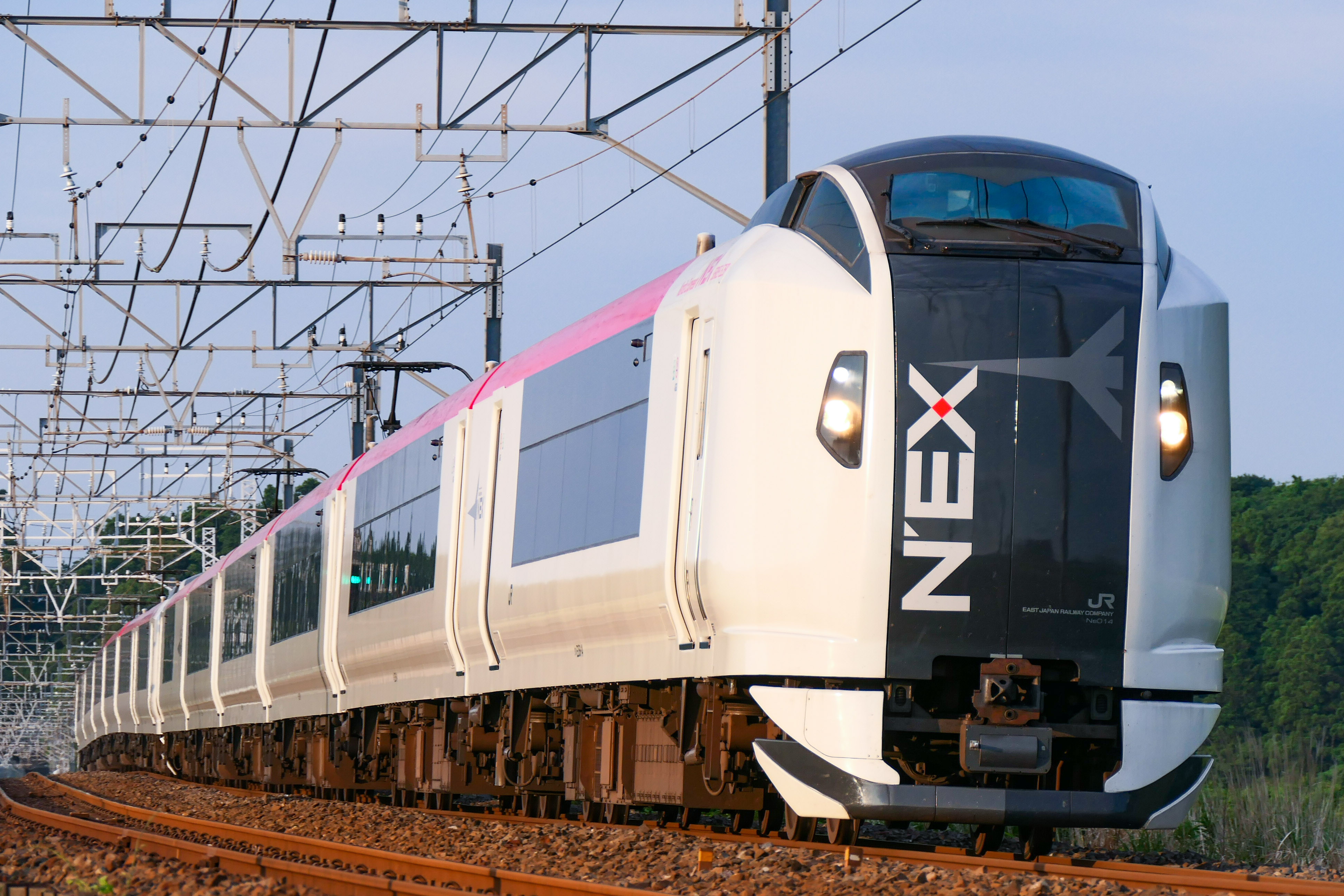
JR East, serving Narita International Airport

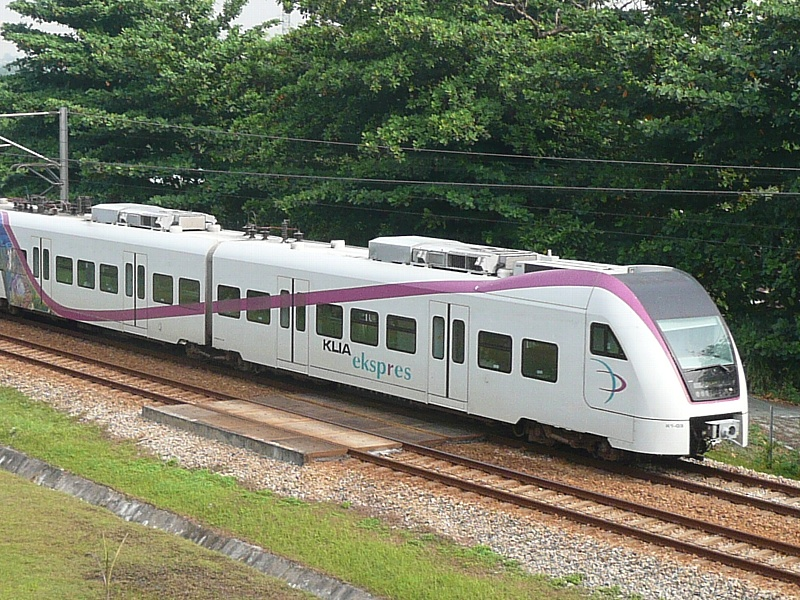
ERL, serving Kuala Lumpur International Airport

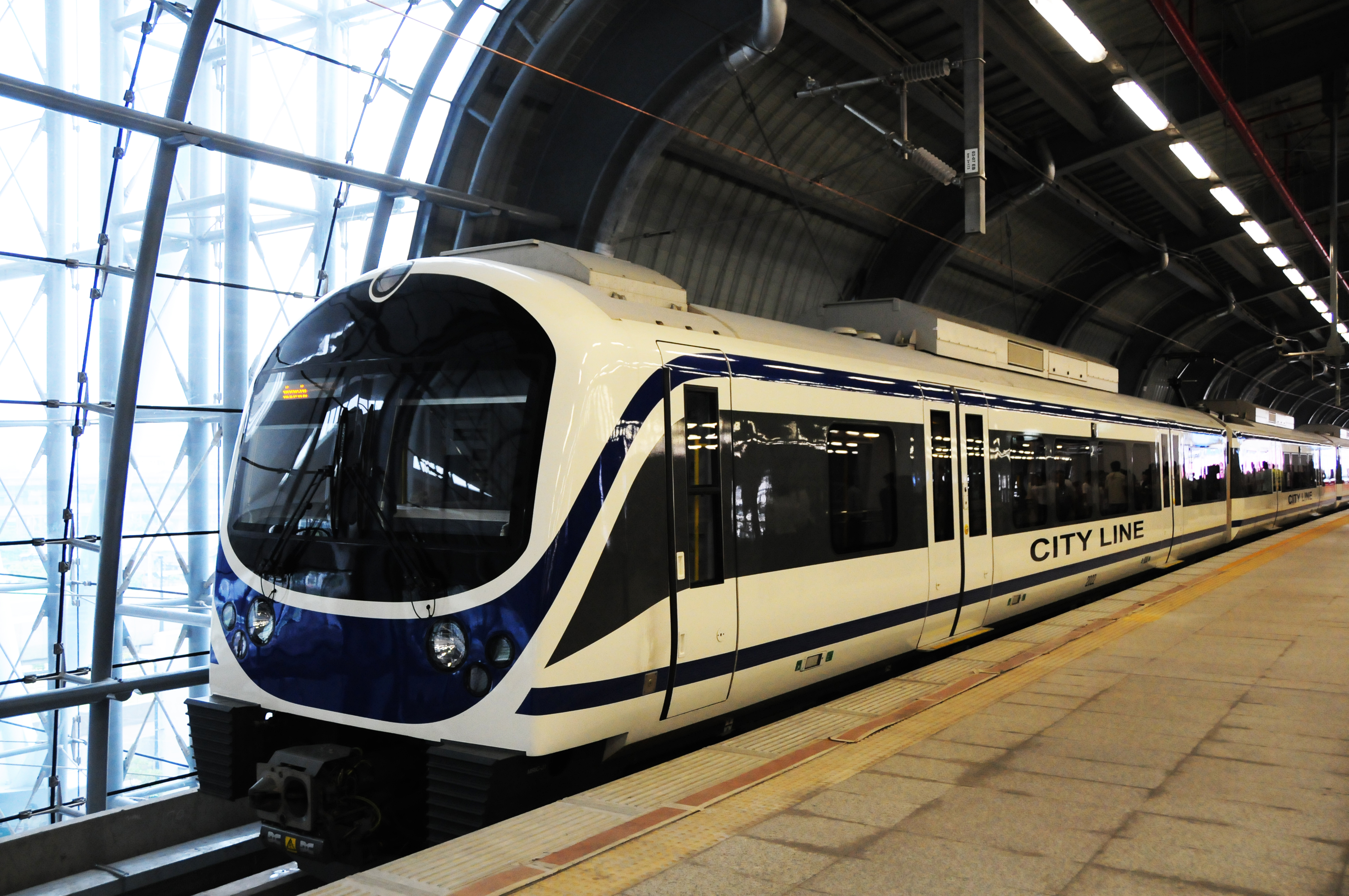
SRT, serving Suvarnabhumi Airport

Country	City	Airport	Rail link	Station name
China	Guangzhou	Guangzhou Baiyun International Airport	PRDIR Guangfo Circular Line	Baiyun Airport East
China	Guangzhou	Guangzhou Baiyun International Airport	PRDIR Guangfo Circular Line	Baiyun Airport North
China	Guangzhou	Guangzhou Baiyun International Airport	PRDIR Guangfo Circular Line	Baiyun Airport South
China	Shanghai	Shanghai Hongqiao International Airport	Shanghai Suburban Railway Airport Link Line	Hongqiao Airport Terminal 2
China	Shanghai	Shanghai Pudong International Airport	Shanghai Suburban Railway Airport Link Line	Pudong Airport Terminal 1&2
China	Shenzhen	Shenzhen Bao'an International Airport	PRDIR Suishen Line	Shenzhen Airport
Hong Kong	Hong Kong	Hong Kong International Airport	MTR Airport Express	Airport
India	Chennai	Chennai International Airport	Indian Railways Chennai Suburban Railway South Line	Tirusulam
Indonesia	Medan	Kualanamu International Airport	KAI Srilelawangsa Line	Kualanamu
Indonesia	Padang	Minangkabau International Airport	KAI Minangkabau Express	Bandara Internasional Minangkabau
Indonesia	Surakarta	Adisumarmo Airport	KAI Bandara Internasional Adi Soemarmo Line	Adi Soemarmo
Indonesia	Yogyakarta	Adisucipto Airport	KAI Commuter Yogyakarta Line	Maguwo
Indonesia	Yogyakarta	Yogyakarta International Airport	KAI Bandara YIA Line	Yogyakarta International Airport
Japan	Miyazaki	Miyazaki Airport	JR Kyushu Miyazaki Kūkō Line	Miyazaki Airport
Japan	Nagoya	Chubu Centrair International Airport	Meitetsu Airport Line	Central Japan International Airport
Japan	Osaka	Kansai International Airport	JR West Kansai Airport Line	Kansai Airport
Japan	Osaka	Kansai International Airport	Nankai Airport Line	Kansai Airport
Japan	Sapporo	New Chitose Airport	JR Hokkaido Chitose Line	New Chitose Airport
Japan	Sendai	Sendai Airport	Sendai Airport Transit Sendai Airport Access Line	Sendai Airport
Japan	Tokyo	Narita International Airport	JR East Narita Line	Narita Airport Terminal 1
Japan	Tokyo	Narita International Airport	JR East Narita Line	Narita Airport Terminal 2·3
Japan	Tokyo	Narita International Airport	Keisei Narita Airport Line	Narita Airport Terminal 1
Japan	Tokyo	Narita International Airport	Keisei Narita Airport Line	Narita Airport Terminal 2·3
Japan	Tokyo	Narita International Airport	Keisei Main Line	Narita Airport Terminal 1
Japan	Tokyo	Narita International Airport	Keisei Main Line	Narita Airport Terminal 2·3
Japan	Tokyo	Haneda Airport	Keikyū Airport Line	Haneda Airport Terminal 1·2
Japan	Tokyo	Haneda Airport	Keikyū Airport Line	Haneda Airport Terminal 3
Japan	Ube	Yamaguchi Ube Airport	JR West Ube Line	Kusae
Japan	Yonago	Yonago Airport	JR West Sakai Line	Yonago-Airport
Malaysia	Kuala Lumpur	Kuala Lumpur International Airport	ERL KLIA Ekspres	KLIA T1
Malaysia	Kuala Lumpur	Kuala Lumpur International Airport	ERL KLIA Ekspres	KLIA T2
Malaysia	Kuala Lumpur	Kuala Lumpur International Airport	ERL KLIA Transit	KLIA T1
Malaysia	Kuala Lumpur	Kuala Lumpur International Airport	ERL KLIA Transit	KLIA T2
Russia	Vladivostok	Vladivostok International Airport	Express Primorya	Knevichi
South Korea	Cheongju	Cheongju International Airport	Korail Chungbuk Line	Cheongju International Airport
South Korea	Seoul	Gimpo International Airport	AREX	Gimpo Int'l Airport
South Korea	Seoul	Gimpo International Airport	Korail Seohae Line	Gimpo Int'l Airport
South Korea	Seoul	Incheon International Airport	AREX	Incheon Int'l Airport T1
South Korea	Seoul	Incheon International Airport	AREX	Incheon Int'l Airport T2
Thailand	Bangkok	Don Mueang International Airport	SRT Dark Red Line	Don Mueang
Thailand	Bangkok	Suvarnabhumi Airport	SRT Airport Rail Link	Suvarnabhumi
Turkey	İzmir	Adnan Menderes Airport	İZBAN Suburban Line	Adnan Menderes Havalimanı

=== Europe ===
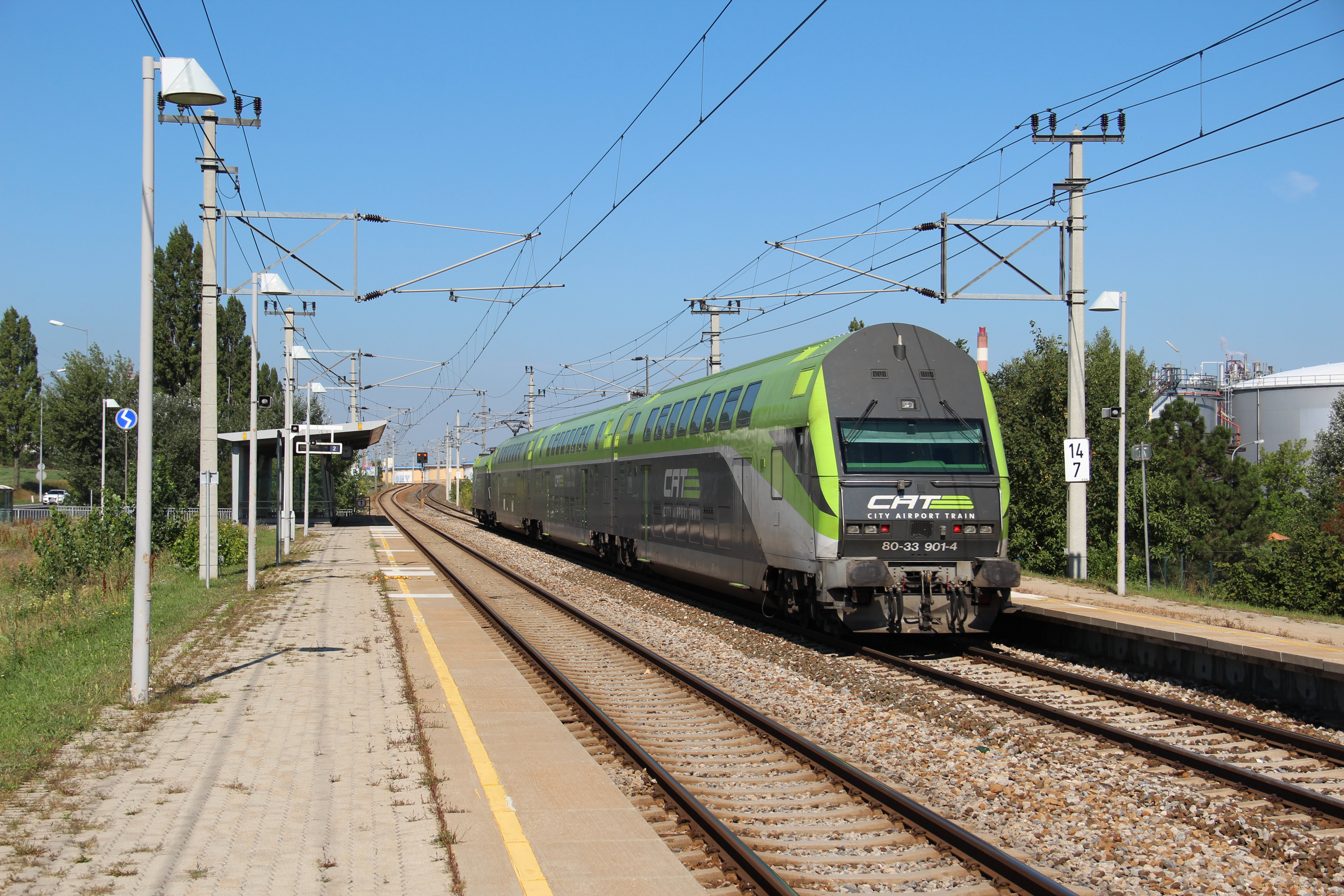
City Airport Train, serving Vienna Airport

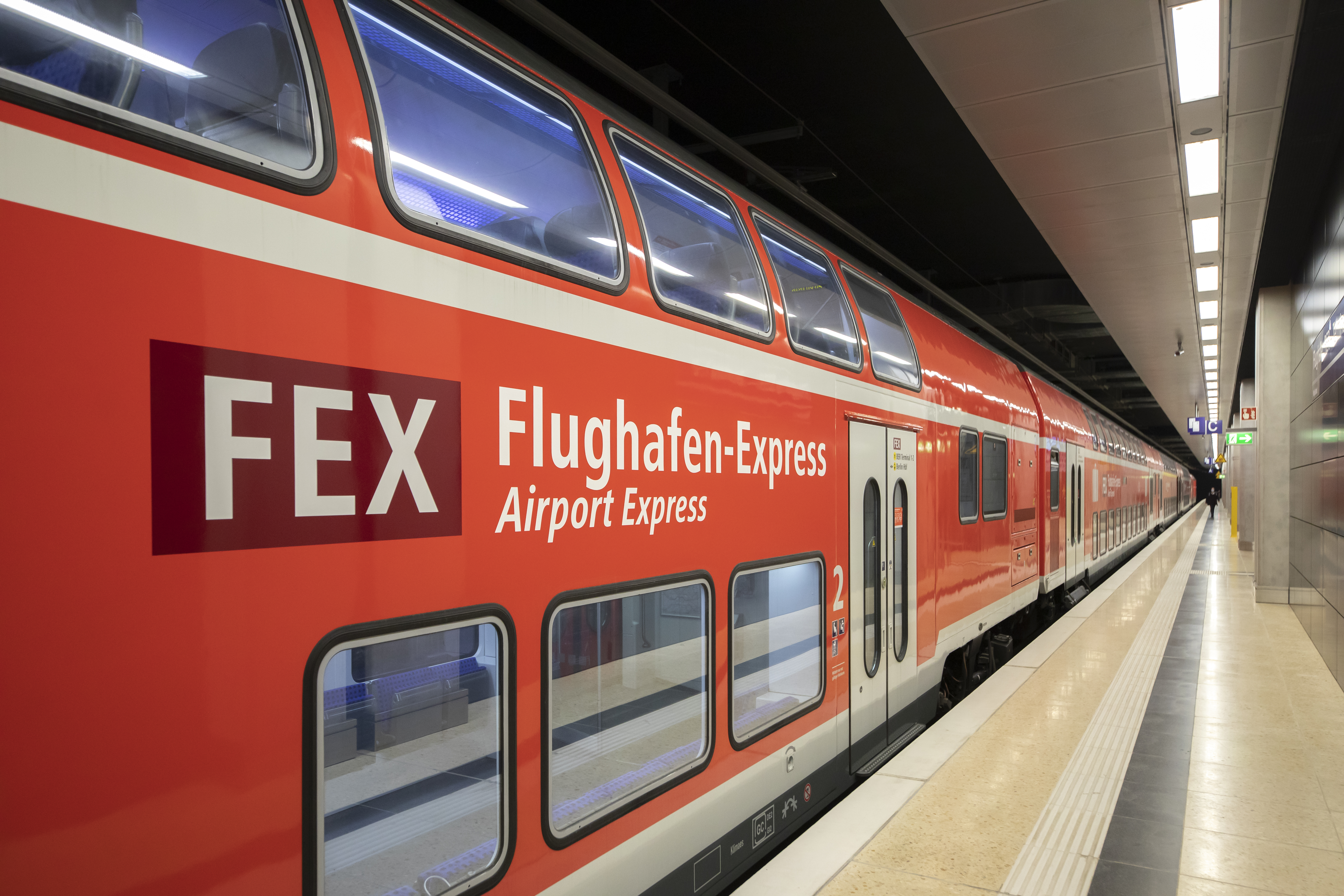
Flughafen-Express, serving Berlin Brandenburg Airport

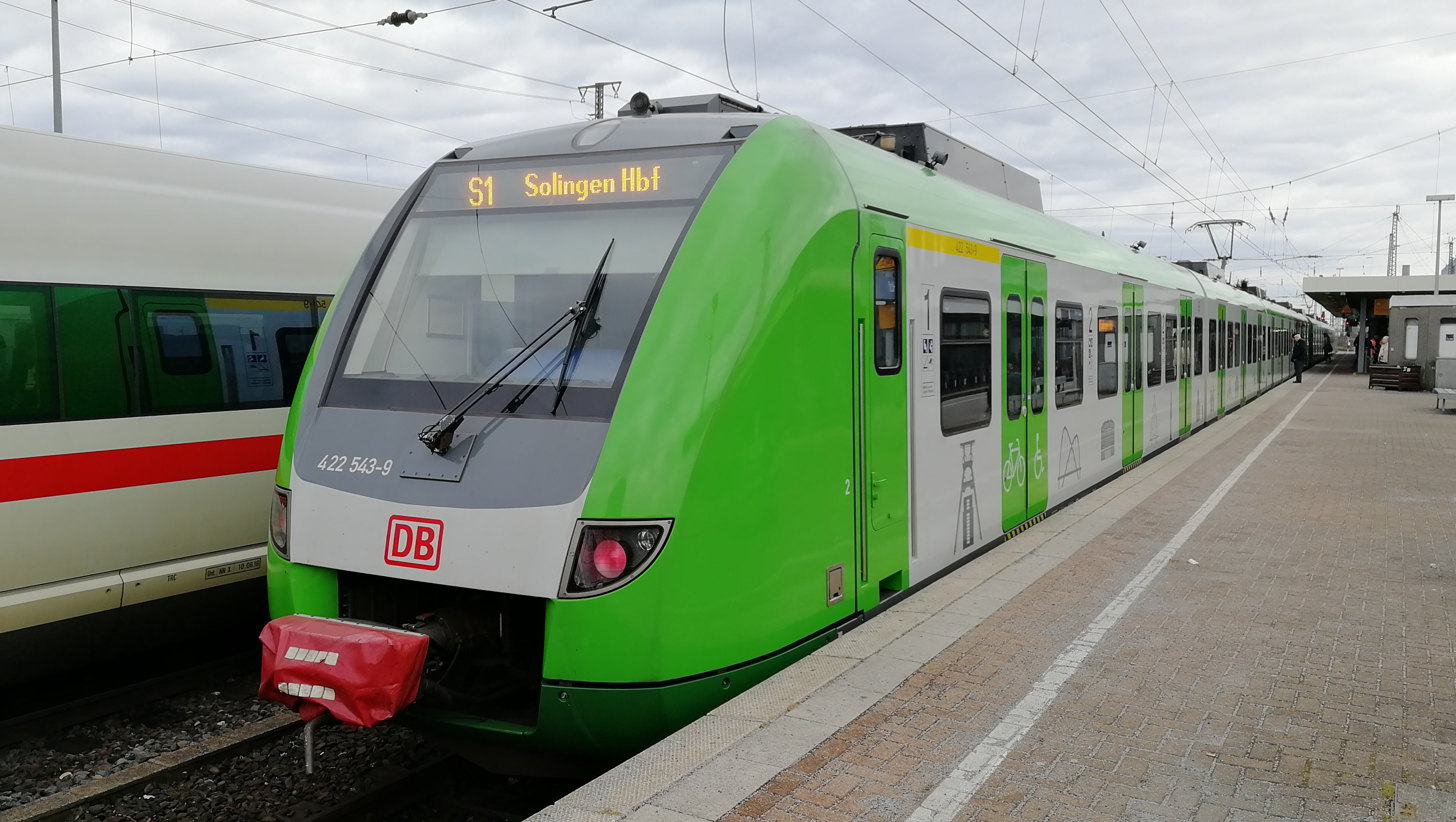
Rhine-Ruhr S-Bahn, serving Düsseldorf Airport

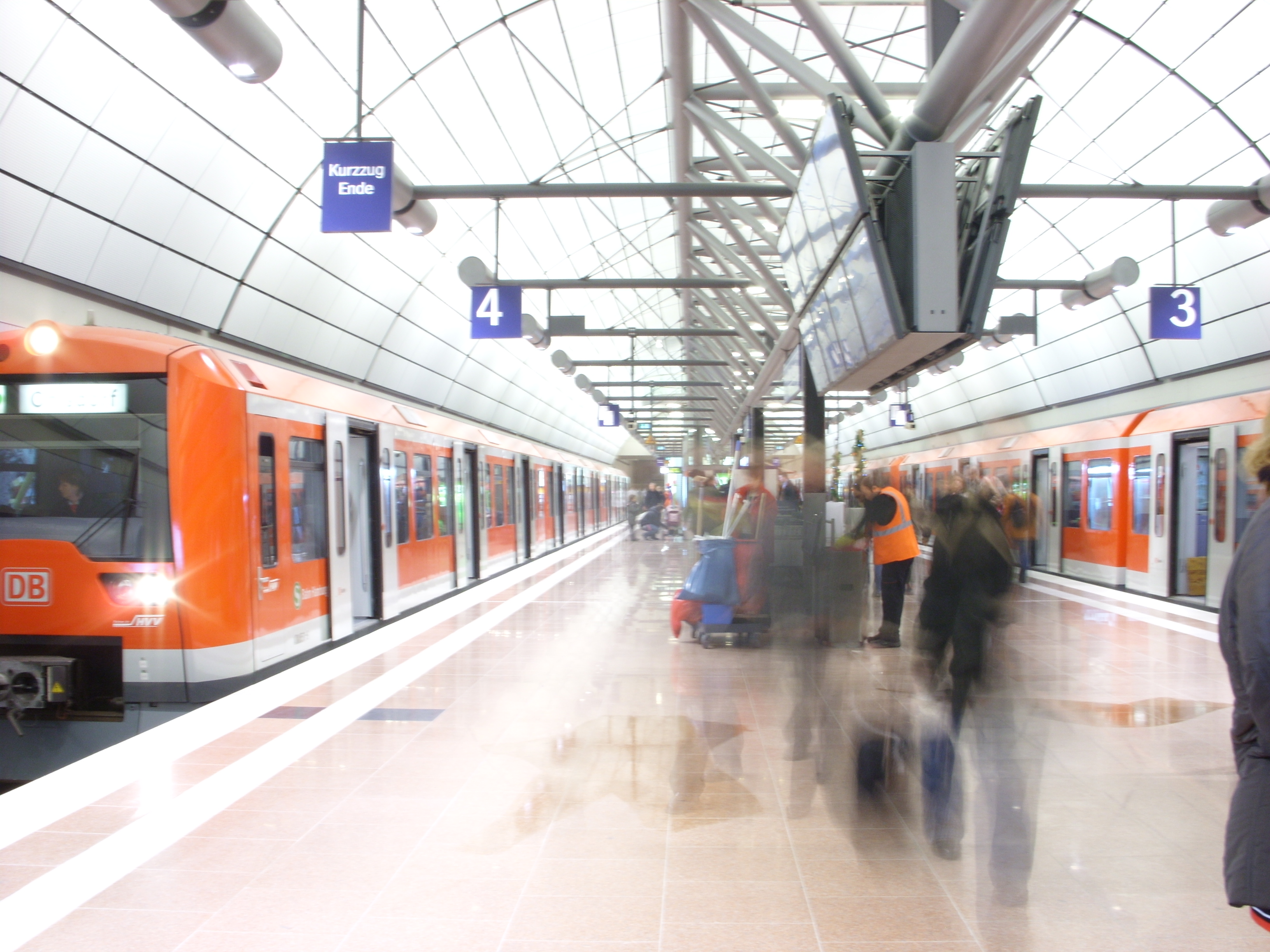
Hamburg S-Bahn, serving Hamburg Airport

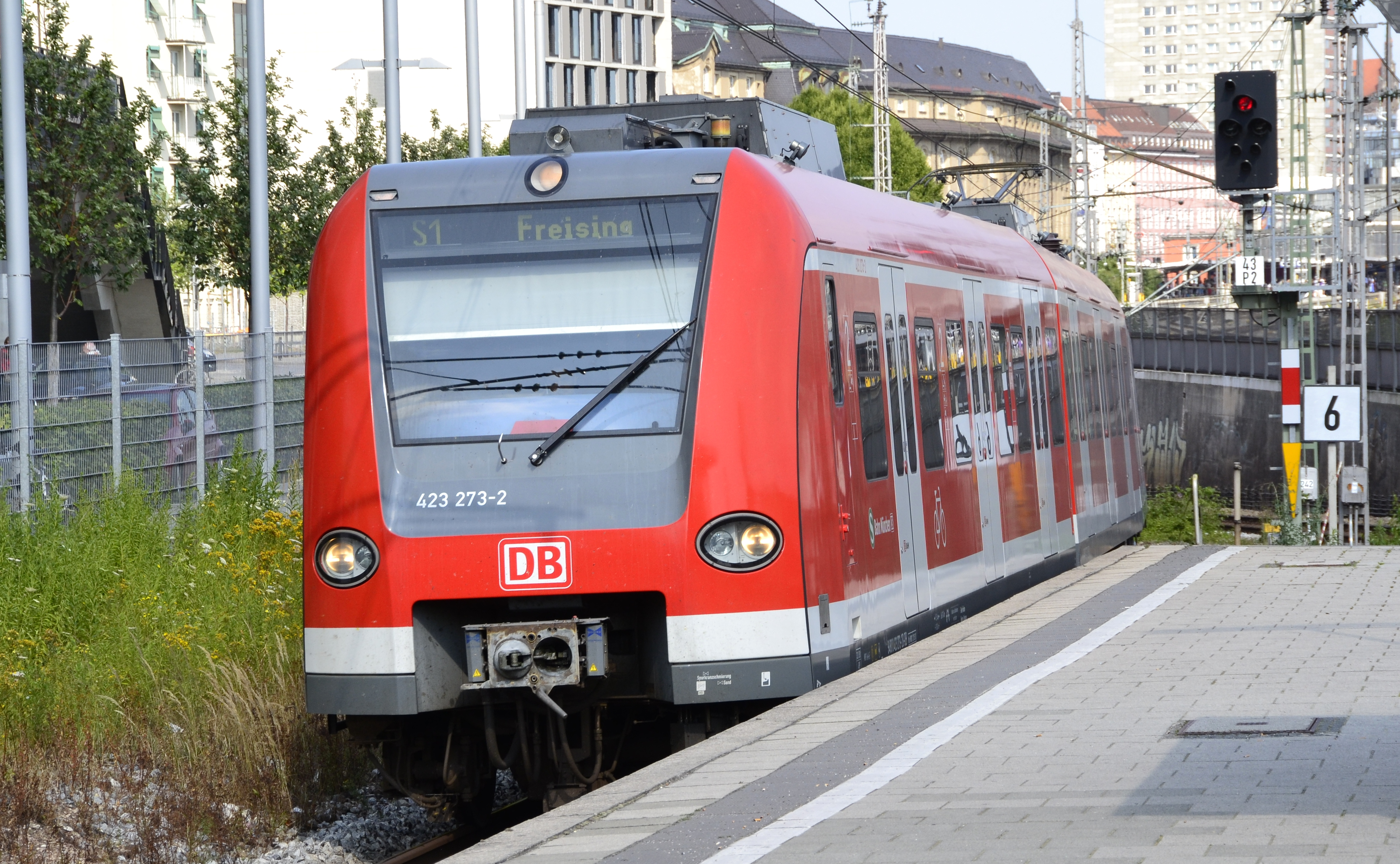
Munich S-Bahn, serving Munich Airport

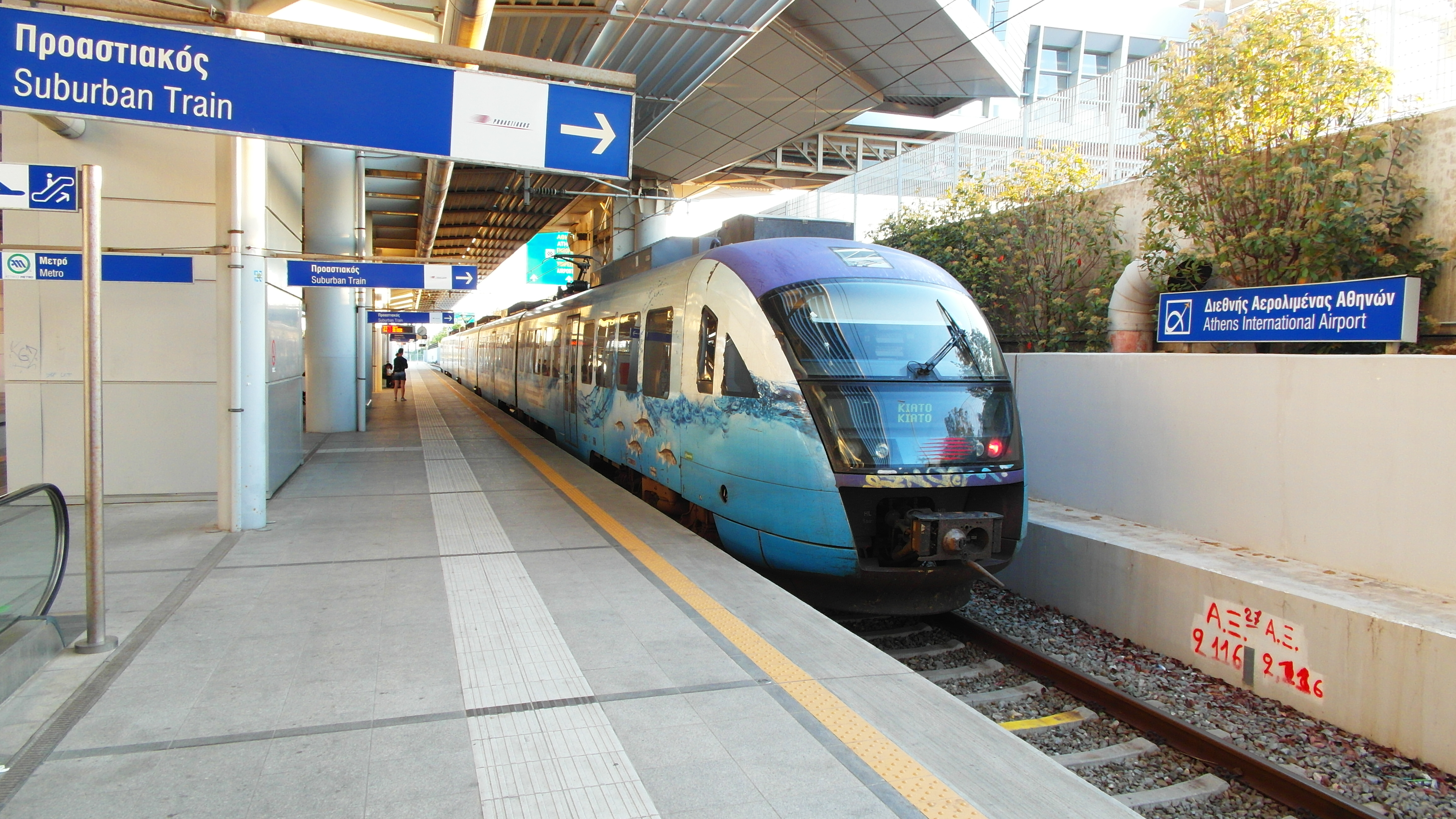
Hellenic Train, serving Athens International Airport

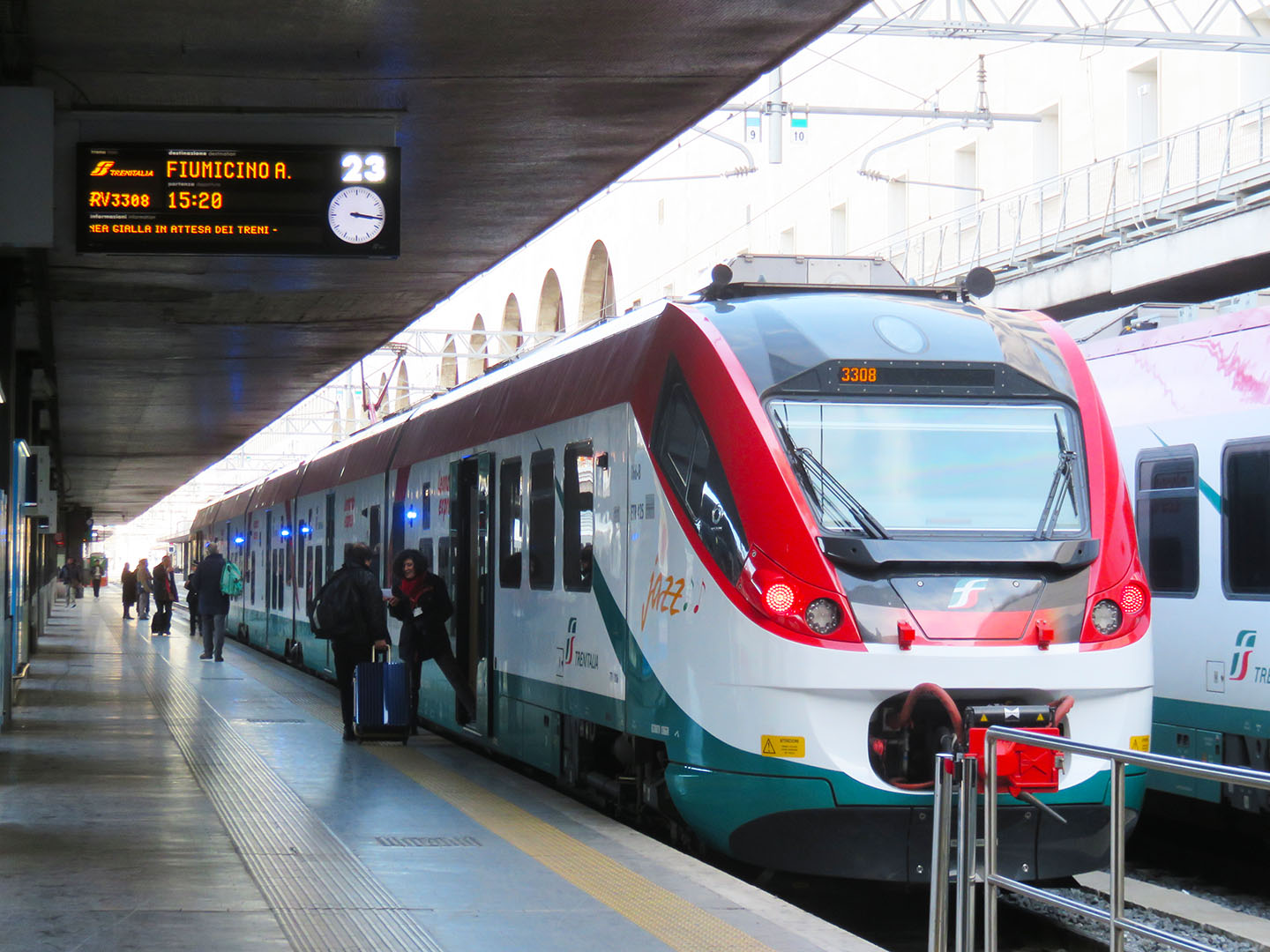
Leonardo Express, serving Rome Fiumicino Airport

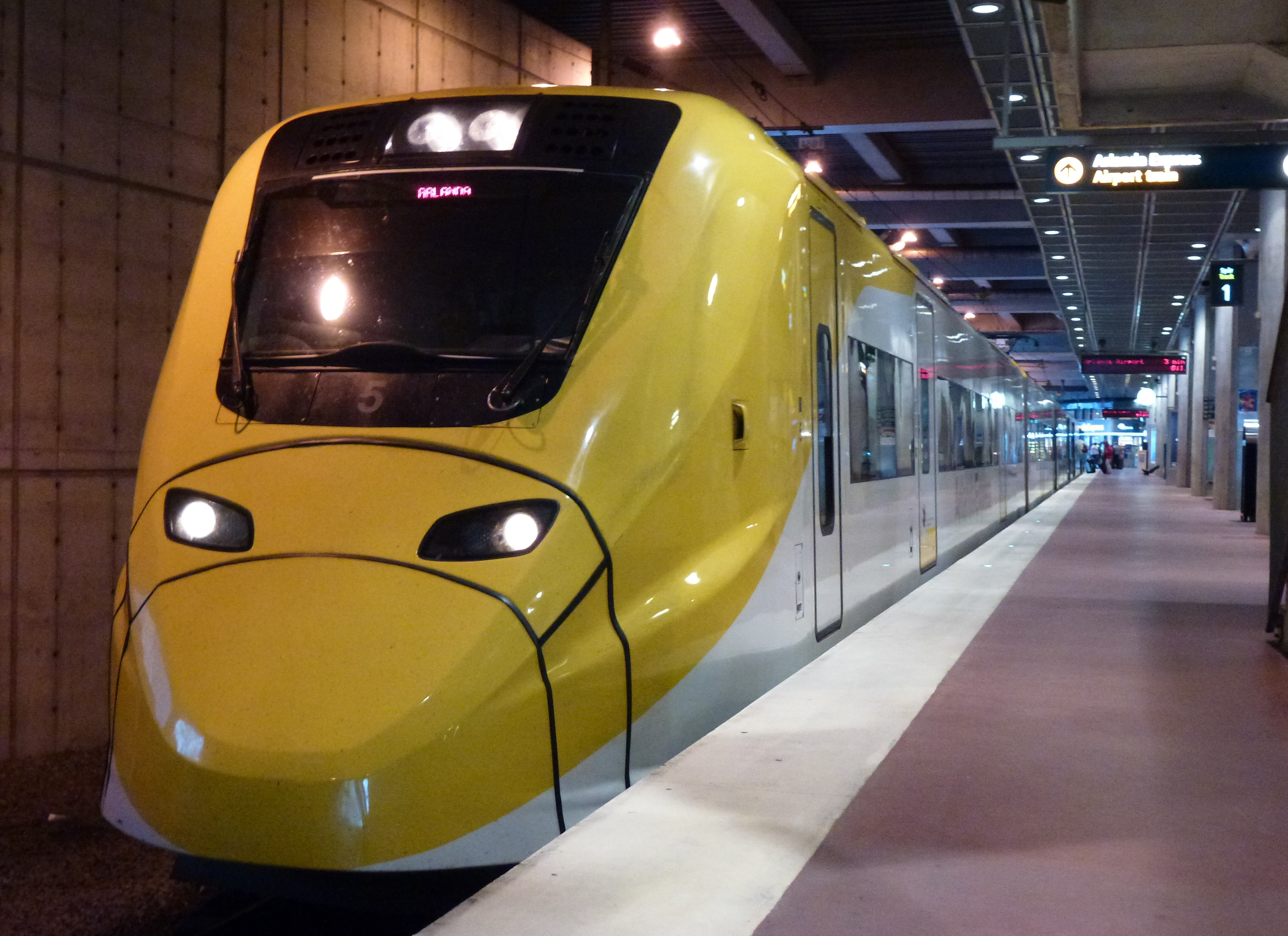
Arlanda Express, serving Stockholm Arlanda Airport

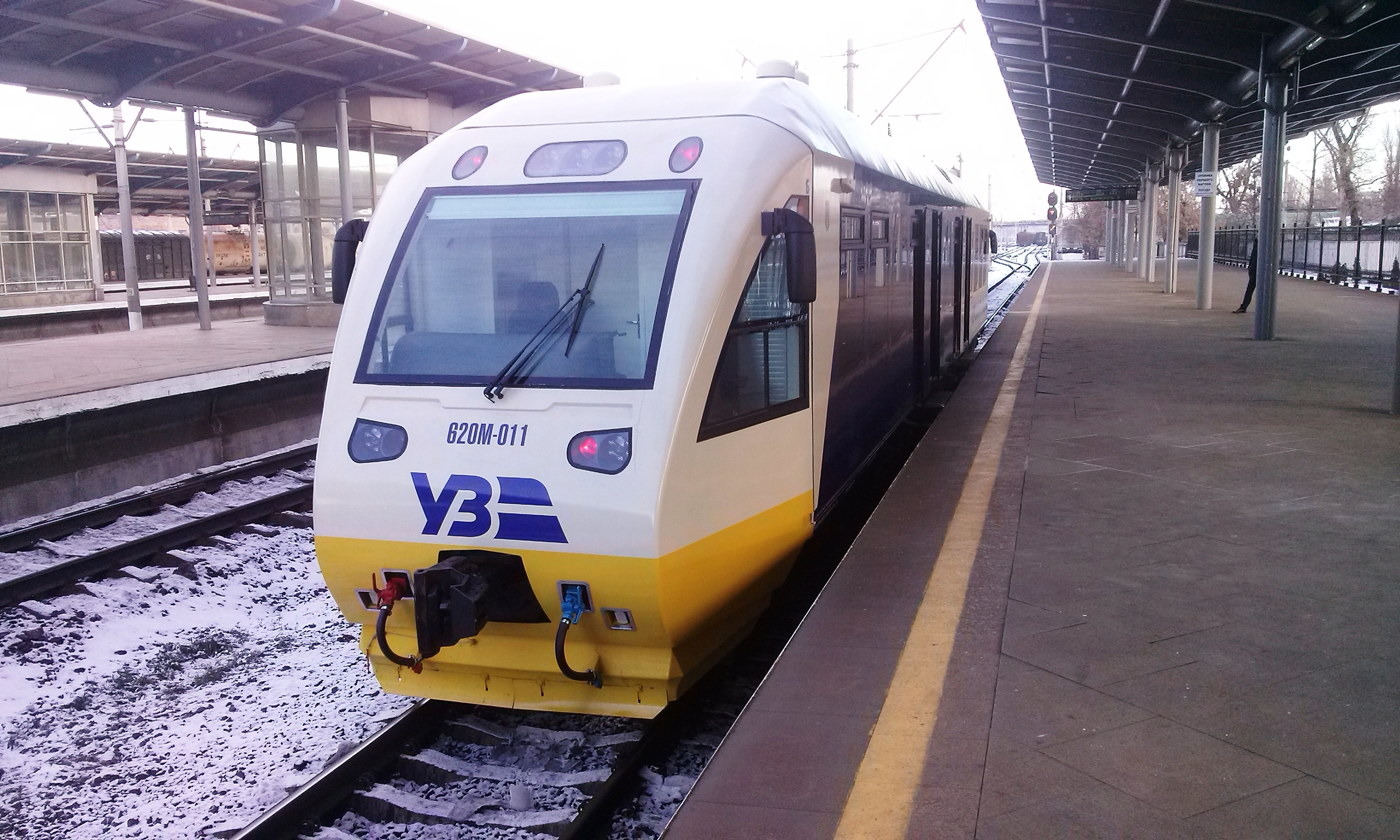
Kyiv Boryspil Express, serving Boryspil International Airport

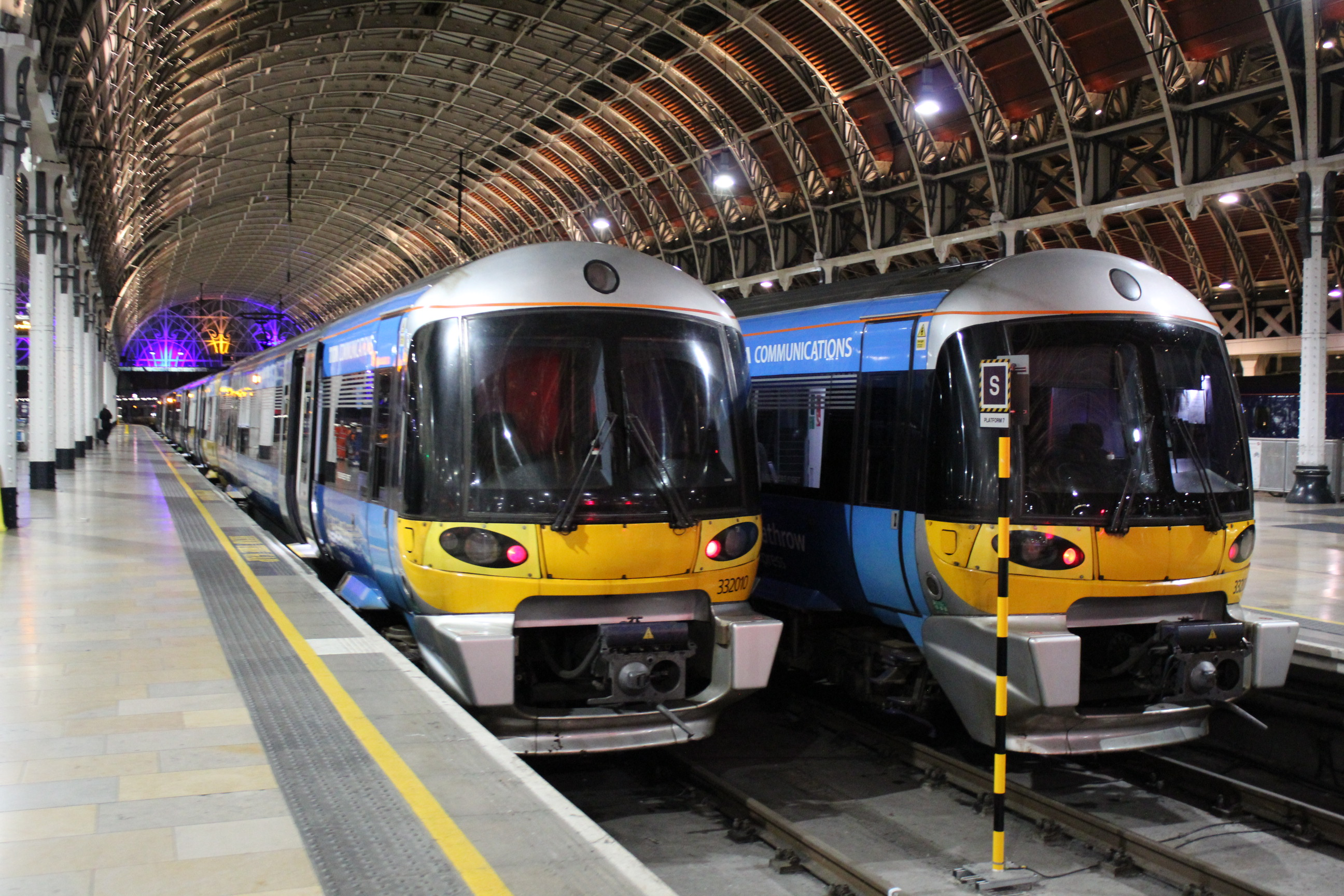
Heathrow Express, serving Heathrow Airport

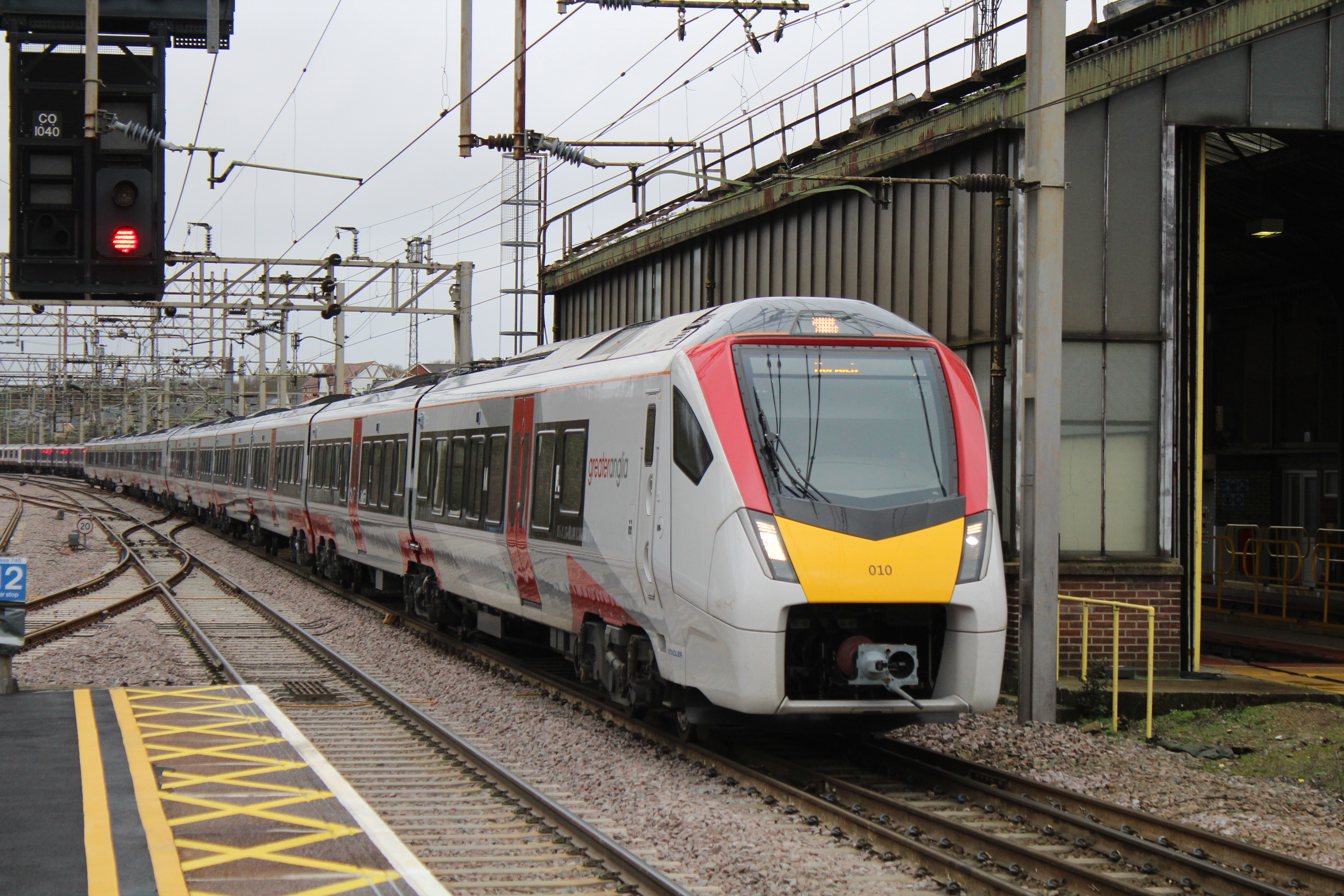
Stansted Express, serving London Stansted Airport

Country	City	Airport	Rail link	Station name
Austria	Graz	Graz Airport	Styria S-Bahn S1	Flughafen Graz-Feldkirchen
Austria	Vienna	Vienna Airport	City Airport Train	Flughafen Wien
Austria	Vienna	Vienna Airport	Vienna S-Bahn S7	Flughafen Wien
Denmark	Copenhagen	Copenhagen Airport	Øresundståg	Københavns Lufthavn
Finland	Helsinki	Helsinki Airport	HSL I	Airport
Finland	Helsinki	Helsinki Airport	HSL P	Airport
France	Clermont-Ferrand	Clermont-Ferrand Auvergne Airport	TER Auvergne-Rhône-Alpes	Aulnat-Aéroport
France	Paris	Paris Charles de Gaulle Airport	RER B	Aéroport Charles de Gaulle 1
France	Paris	Paris Charles de Gaulle Airport	RER B	Aéroport Charles de Gaulle 2 TGV
France	Strasbourg	Strasbourg Airport	TER Fluo Grand Est	Entzheim-Aéroport
Germany	Berlin	Berlin Brandenburg Airport	Berlin S-Bahn 45	Flughafen BER
Germany	Berlin	Berlin Brandenburg Airport	Berlin S-Bahn 9	Flughafen BER
Germany	Berlin	Berlin Brandenburg Airport	Flughafen-Express	Flughafen BER
Germany	Berlin	Berlin Brandenburg Airport	Regionalbahn	Flughafen BER
Germany	Berlin	Berlin Brandenburg Airport	Regional-Express	Flughafen BER
Germany	Cologne	Cologne Bonn Airport	Regionalbahn	Köln/Bonn Flughafen
Germany	Cologne	Cologne Bonn Airport	Regional-Express	Köln/Bonn Flughafen
Germany	Cologne	Cologne Bonn Airport	Rhine-Ruhr S-Bahn S10	Köln/Bonn Flughafen
Germany	Cologne	Cologne Bonn Airport	Rhine-Ruhr S-Bahn S13	Köln/Bonn Flughafen
Germany	Dresden	Dresden Airport	Dresden S-Bahn	Dresden Flughafen
Germany	Düsseldorf	Düsseldorf Airport	Rhine-Ruhr S-Bahn S11	Düsseldorf Flughafen Terminal
Germany	Frankfurt	Frankfurt Airport	Regionalbahn	Frankfurt am Main Flughafen Fernbahnhof
Germany	Frankfurt	Frankfurt Airport	Regional-Express	Frankfurt am Main Flughafen Regionalbahnhof
Germany	Frankfurt	Frankfurt Airport	Rhine-Main S-Bahn S8	Frankfurt am Main Flughafen Regionalbahnhof
Germany	Frankfurt	Frankfurt Airport	Rhine-Main S-Bahn S9	Frankfurt am Main Flughafen Regionalbahnhof
Germany	Friedrichshafen	Friedrichshafen Airport	Interregio-Express	Friedrichshafen Flughafen
Germany	Hamburg	Hamburg Airport	Hamburg S-Bahn S1	Hamburg Airport (Flughafen)
Germany	Hanover	Hannover Airport	Hanover S-Bahn S5	Hannover Flughafen
Germany	Hanover	Hannover Airport	Hanover S-Bahn S8	Hannover Flughafen
Germany	Leipzig	Leipzig/Halle Airport	Mitteldeutschland S5	Flughafen Leipzig/Halle
Germany	Leipzig	Leipzig/Halle Airport	Mitteldeutschland S5X	Flughafen Leipzig/Halle
Germany	Lübeck	Lübeck Airport	Regional-Express 83	Lübeck-Flughafen
Germany	Munich	Munich Airport	Munich S1	Flughafen München
Germany	Munich	Munich Airport	Munich S8	Flughafen München
Germany	Munich	Munich Airport	Regionalbahn	Flughafen München
Germany	Stuttgart	Stuttgart Airport	Stuttgart S-Bahn S2	Stuttgart Flughafen/Messe
Germany	Stuttgart	Stuttgart Airport	Stuttgart S-Bahn S3	Stuttgart Flughafen/Messe
Greece	Athens	Athens International Airport	Athens Suburban Railway A1	Athens International Airport
Greece	Athens	Athens International Airport	Athens Suburban Railway A2	Athens International Airport
Italy	Ancona	Marche Airport	Rome–Ancona railway	Castelferretti-Falconara Aeroporto delle Marche
Italy	Bari	Bari Airport	Bari metropolitan railway service	Bari Aeroporto
Italy	Cagliari	Cagliari Airport	Cagliari–Golfo Aranci railway	Elmas Aerporto
Italy	Milan	Milan Malpensa Airport	Malpensa Express	Malpensa Aeroporto Terminal 1
Italy	Milan	Milan Malpensa Airport	Malpensa Express	Malpensa Aeroporto Terminal 2
Italy	Milan	Milan Malpensa Airport	TILO	Malpensa Aeroporto Terminal 1
Italy	Milan	Milan Malpensa Airport	TILO	Malpensa Aeroporto Terminal 2
Italy	Palermo	Palermo Airport	Palermo metropolitan railway service	Palermo Aeroporto
Italy	Rome	Rome Fiumicino Airport	Lazio regional railways FL1	Fiumicino Aeroporto
Italy	Rome	Rome Fiumicino Airport	Leonardo Express	Fiumicino Aeroporto
Italy	Trieste	Trieste Airport	Venice–Trieste railway	Trieste Airport
Italy	Turin	Turin Airport	Line SFMA	Torino Aeroporto
Lithuania	Vilnius	Vilnius International Airport	Lithuanian Railways	Vilnius Airport
Netherlands	Amsterdam	Amsterdam Airport Schiphol	NS Sprinter	Schiphol Airport
Norway	Oslo	Oslo Airport	Oslo Commuter Rail L12	Oslo Airport (Gardermoen)
Norway	Trondheim	Trondheim Airport	Nordland Line F7	Trondheim Airport (Værnes)
Norway	Trondheim	Trondheim Airport	Trøndelag Commuter Rail R70	Trondheim Airport (Værnes)
Poland	Gdańsk	Gdańsk Lech Wałęsa Airport	Pomorska Kolej Metropolitalna	Gdańsk Port Lotniczy
Poland	Katowice	Katowice Airport	Silesian Railways	Pyrzowice Lotnisko
Poland	Kraków	Kraków John Paul II International Airport	Lesser Poland Railways	Kraków Lotnisko
Poland	Olsztyn	Olsztyn-Mazury Airport	Polregio	Szymany Lotnisko
Poland	Rzeszów	Rzeszów–Jasionka Airport	Polregio	Jasionka Lotnisko
Poland	Szczecin	Solidarity Szczecin–Goleniów Airport	Polregio	Port Lotniczy Szczecin Goleniów
Poland	Warsaw	Warsaw Frederic Chopin Airport	Masovian Railways	Warszawa Lotnisko Chopina
Poland	Warsaw	Warsaw Frederic Chopin Airport	Rapid Urban Railway (Warsaw)	Warszawa Lotnisko Chopina
Romania	Bucharest	Bucharest Henri Coandă International Airport	Căile Ferate Române	Aeroport Henri Coandă
Russia	Kazan	Kazan International Airport	Sodruzhestvo	Aeroport (Kazan)
Russia	Moscow	Domodedovo International Airport	Aeroexpress	Aeroport Domodedovo
Russia	Moscow	Sheremetyevo International Airport	Aeroexpress	Aeroport Sheremet'yevo
Russia	Moscow	Sheremetyevo International Airport	Aeroexpress	Aeroport Sheremet'yevo-Severnoye
Russia	Moscow	Vnukovo International Airport	Central Suburban Passenger Company	Aeroport Vnukovo
Russia	Sochi	Sochi International Airport	Russian Railways	Aeroport Sochi
Spain	Barcelona	Josep Tarradellas Barcelona–El Prat Airport	Rodalies de Catalunya R2	Aeroport
Spain	Jerez de la Frontera	Jerez Airport	Cercanías Cádiz C-1	Aeropuerto de Jerez
Spain	Madrid	Adolfo Suárez Madrid–Barajas Airport	Cercanías Madrid C-1	Aeropuerto T4
Spain	Málaga	Málaga–Costa del Sol Airport	Cercanías Madrid C-1	Aeropuerto
Sweden	Stockholm	Stockholm Arlanda Airport	Arlanda Express	Arlanda North
Sweden	Stockholm	Stockholm Arlanda Airport	Arlanda Express	Arlanda South
Sweden	Stockholm	Stockholm Arlanda Airport	Mälartåg	Arlanda Central
Sweden	Stockholm	Stockholm Arlanda Airport	SL	Arlanda Central
Switzerland	Geneva	Genève Aéroport	InterRegio	Geneva Airport
Switzerland	Zürich	Zurich Airport	InterRegio	Zürich Flughafen
Switzerland	Zürich	Zurich Airport	Zürich S-Bahn S16	Zürich Flughafen
Switzerland	Zürich	Zurich Airport	Zürich S-Bahn S2	Zürich Flughafen
Switzerland	Zürich	Zurich Airport	Zürich S-Bahn S24	Zürich Flughafen
Ukraine	Kyiv	Boryspil International Airport	Kyiv Boryspil Express	Boryspil-Aeroport
United Kingdom	London	Gatwick Airport	Gatwick Express	Gatwick Airport
United Kingdom	London	Gatwick Airport	Thameslink	Gatwick Airport
United Kingdom	London	Heathrow Airport	Elizabeth line	Heathrow Terminal 4
United Kingdom	London	Heathrow Airport	Elizabeth line	Heathrow Terminal 5
United Kingdom	London	Heathrow Airport	Elizabeth line	Heathrow Terminals 2 & 3
United Kingdom	London	Heathrow Airport	Heathrow Express	Heathrow Terminal 5
United Kingdom	London	Heathrow Airport	Heathrow Express	Heathrow Terminals 2 & 3
United Kingdom	London	London Stansted Airport	Stansted Express	Stansted Airport

=== North America ===
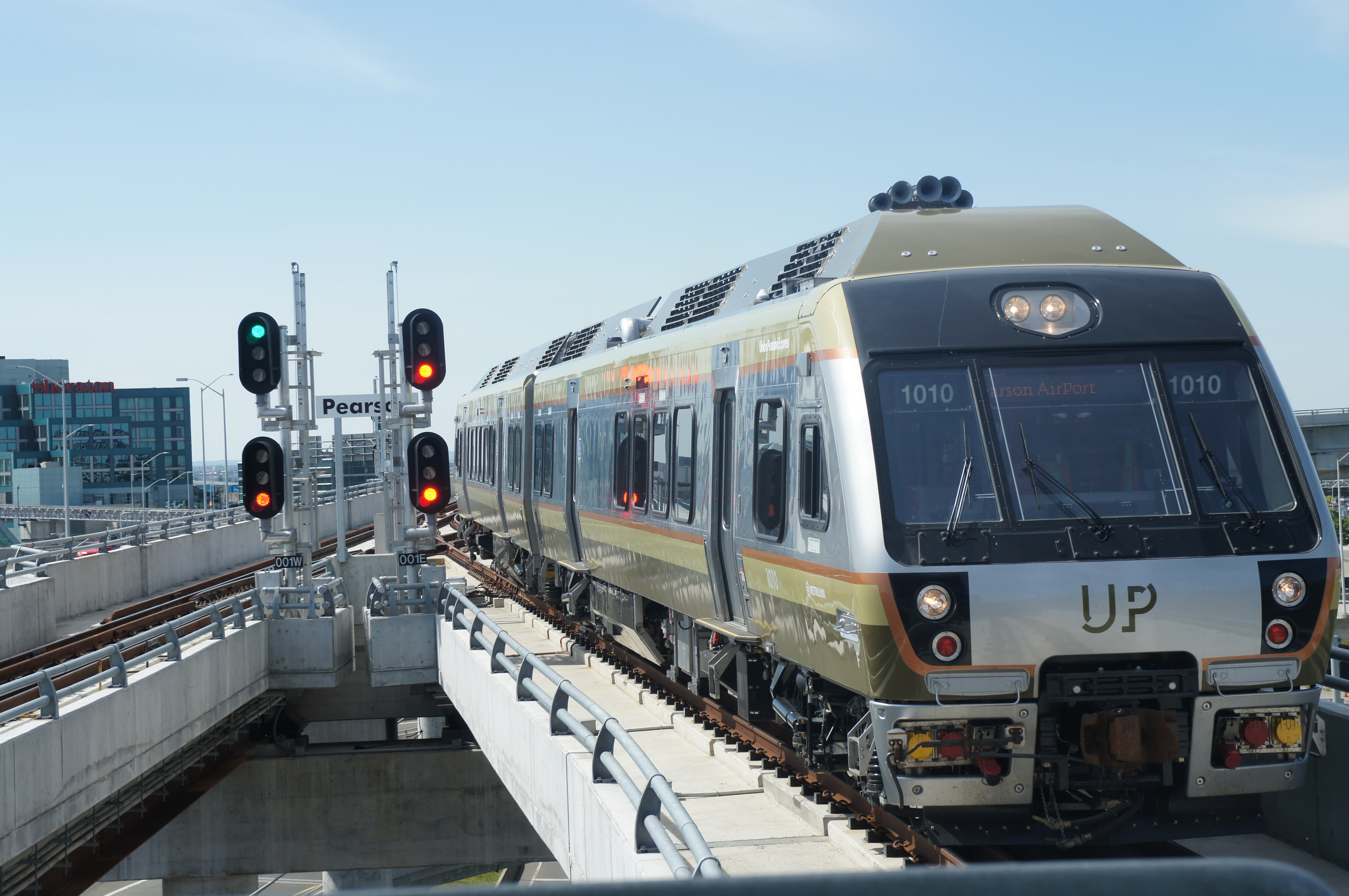
Union Pearson Express, serving Toronto Pearson International Airport

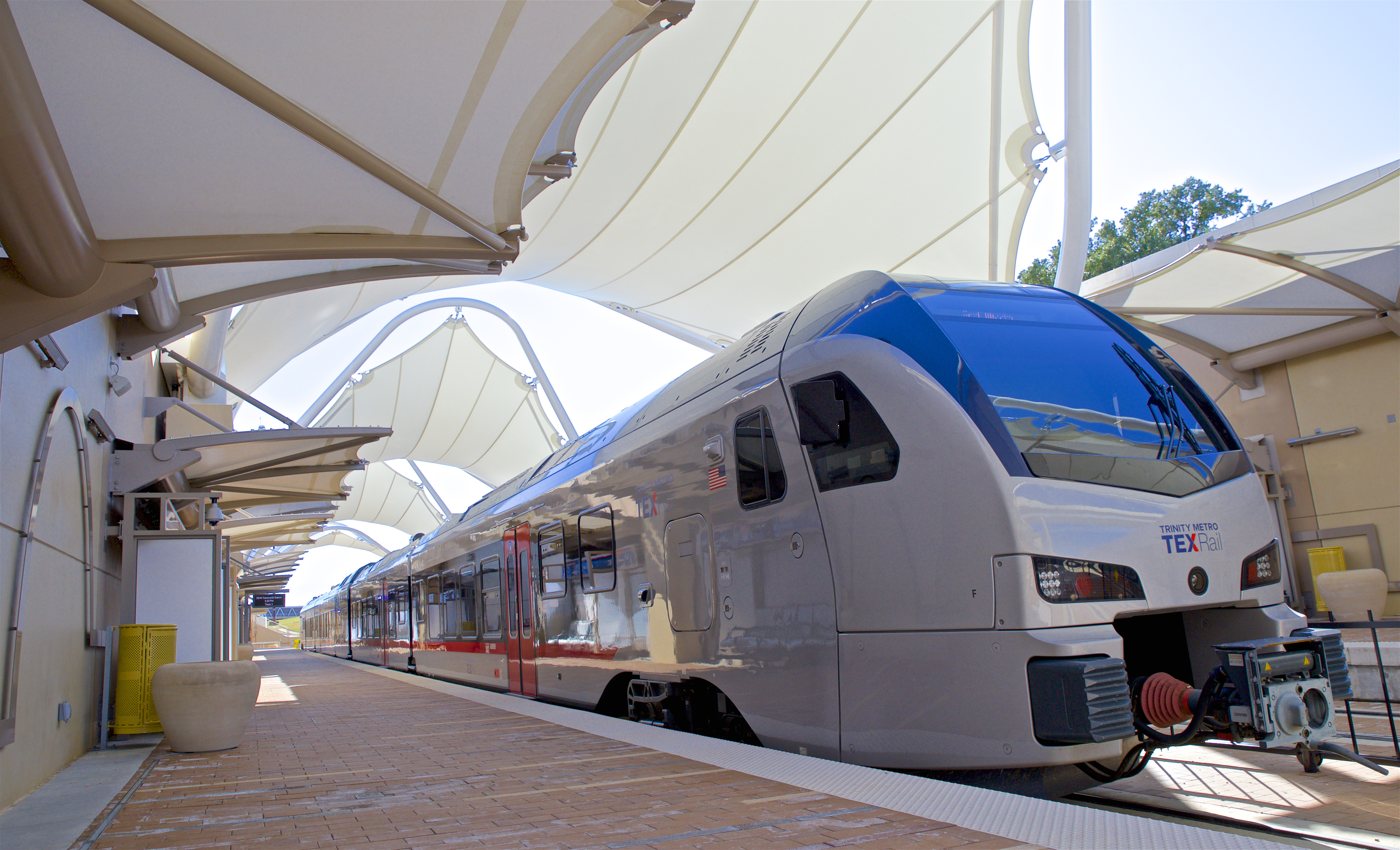
Trinity Metro, serving Dallas Fort Worth International Airport

Country	City	Airport	Rail link	Station name
Canada	Toronto	Toronto Pearson International Airport	Union Pearson Express	Pearson Airport
Mexico	Mexico City	Felipe Ángeles International Airport	Tren Interurbano Felipe Ángeles	AIFA / Clara Krause
United States	Dallas	Dallas Fort Worth International Airport	Trinity Metro TEXRail	DFW Airport Terminal B
United States	Dallas	Dallas Fort Worth International Airport	DART Silver Line	DFW Airport Terminal B
United States	Denver	Denver International Airport	RTD A Line	Denver Airport
United States	Los Angeles	Hollywood Burbank Airport	Metrolink Ventura County Line	Burbank Airport–South
United States	Philadelphia	Philadelphia International Airport	SEPTA Airport Line	Airport Terminal A
United States	Philadelphia	Philadelphia International Airport	SEPTA Airport Line	Airport Terminal B
United States	Philadelphia	Philadelphia International Airport	SEPTA Airport Line	Airport Terminals C & D
United States	Philadelphia	Philadelphia International Airport	SEPTA Airport Line	Airport Terminals E & F
United States	Providence	Rhode Island T. F. Green International Airport	MBTA Providence/Stoughton Line	T.F. Green Airport
United States	South Bend	South Bend International Airport	NICTD South Shore Line	South Bend International Airport

=== Oceania ===
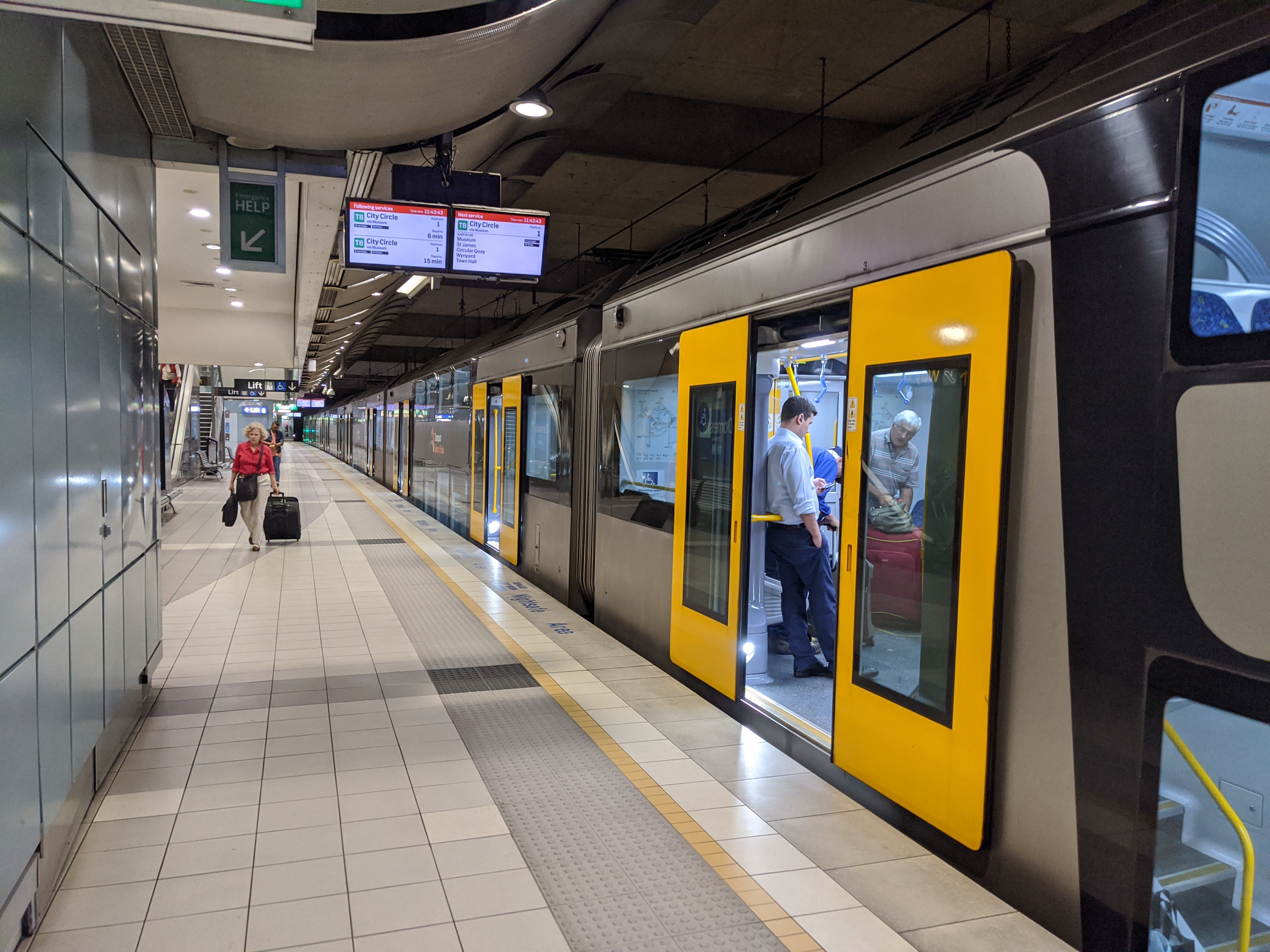
Sydney Trains, serving Sydney Airport

Country	City	Airport	Rail link	Station name
Australia	Brisbane	Brisbane Airport	Queensland Rail T5 Brisbane Airport Line	Domestic Airport
Australia	Brisbane	Brisbane Airport	Queensland Rail T5 Brisbane Airport Line	International Airport
Australia	Perth	Perth Airport	Transperth Airport Line	Airport Central
Australia	Sydney	Sydney Airport	Sydney Trains T8 Airport & South Line	Domestic Airport
Australia	Sydney	Sydney Airport	Sydney Trains T8 Airport & South Line	International Airport
Australia	Wollongong	Shellharbour Airport	NSW TrainLink South Coast Line	Albion Park

=== South America ===
Country	City	Airport	Rail link	Station name
Argentina	Buenos Aires	Aeropuerto Internacional El Palomar	Argentine Trains Operations San Martín Line	El Palomar

== Rapid transit and light rail ==
=== Asia ===
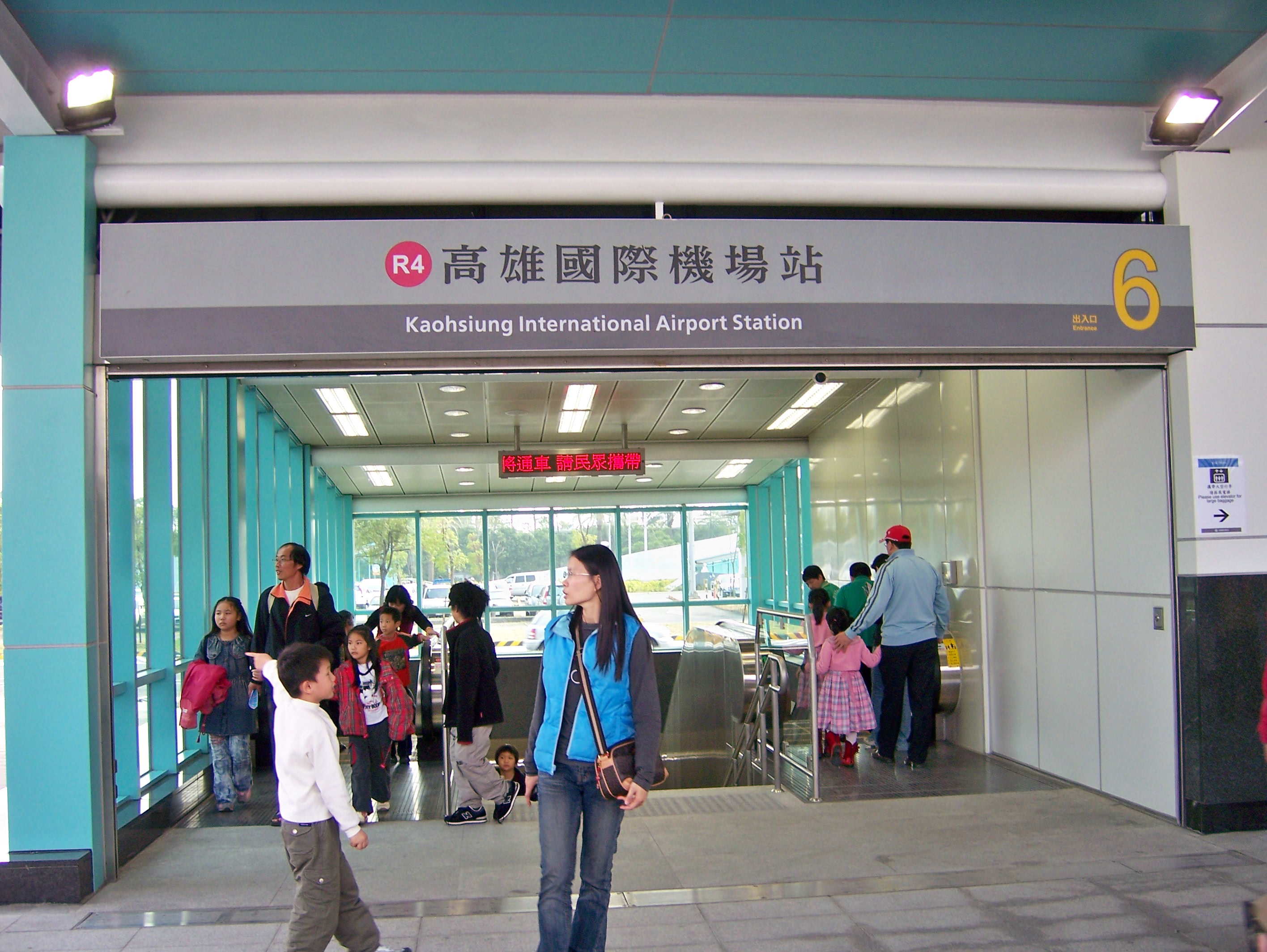
Kaohsiung Metro, serving Kaohsiung International Airport

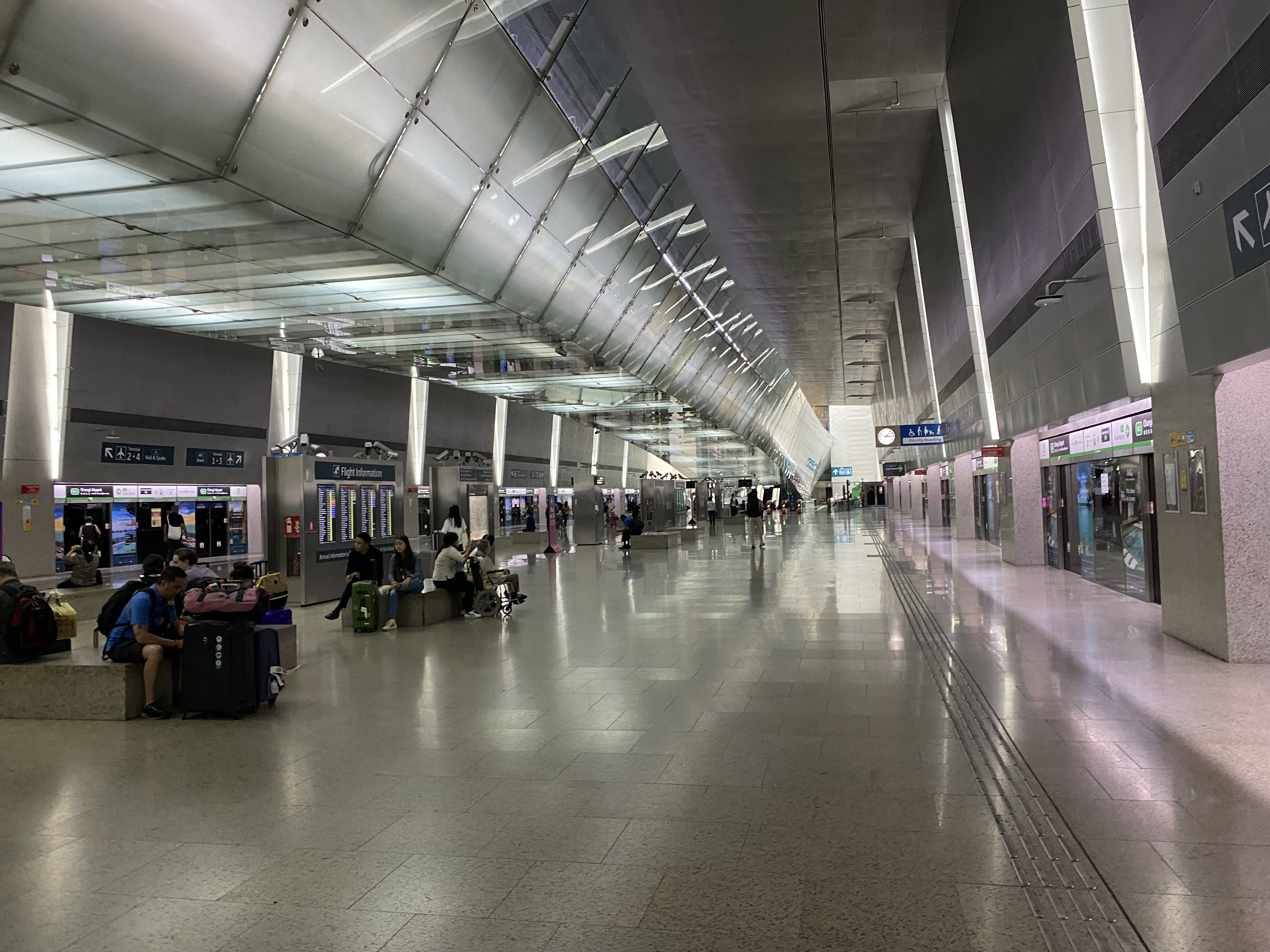
Singapore MRT, serving Singapore Changi Airport

Country	City	Airport	Rail link	Station name
China	Beijing	Beijing Capital International Airport	Beijing Subway Capital Airport Express	2 Hao Hangzhanlou (Terminal 2)
China	Beijing	Beijing Capital International Airport	Beijing Subway Capital Airport Express	3 Hao Hangzhanlou (Terminal 3)
China	Beijing	Beijing Daxing International Airport	Beijing Subway Daxing Airport Express	Daxing Jichang (Daxing Airport)
China	Changsha	Changsha Huanghua International Airport	Changsha Rail Transit Line S2	Huanghua Airport
China	Changsha	Changsha Huanghua International Airport	Changsha Metro Line 6	Huanghua Airport T1 & T2
China	Chengdu	Chengdu Shuangliu International Airport	Chengdu Metro Line 10	Terminal 1 of Shuangliu International Airport
China	Chengdu	Chengdu Shuangliu International Airport	Chengdu Metro Line 10	Terminal 2 of Shuangliu International Airport
China	Chengdu	Chengdu Shuangliu International Airport	Chengdu Metro Line 19	East of Terminal 2 of Shuangliu International Airport
China	Chengdu	Chengdu Shuangliu International Airport	Chengdu Metro Line 30	East of Terminal 2 of Shuangliu International Airport
China	Chengdu	Chengdu Tianfu International Airport	Chengdu Metro Line 18	Terminal 1 & 2 of Tianfu International Airport
China	Chengdu	Chengdu Tianfu International Airport	Chengdu Metro Line 19	Terminal 1 & 2 of Tianfu International Airport
China	Chongqing	Chongqing Jiangbei International Airport	Chongqing Metro Line 3	Terminal 2 of Jiangbei Airport
China	Chongqing	Chongqing Jiangbei International Airport	Chongqing Metro Line 10	Terminal 2 of Jiangbei Airport
China	Chongqing	Chongqing Jiangbei International Airport	Chongqing Metro Line 10	Terminal 3 of Jiangbei Airport
China	Chongqing	Chongqing Jiangbei International Airport	Chongqing Metro Line 15	Terminal 3 of Jiangbei Airport
China	Dalian	Dalian Zhoushuizi International Airport	Dalian Metro Line 2	Airport
China	Foshan	Foshan Shadi Airport	Foshan Metro Line 3	Xiaode Dong
China	Fuzhou	Fuzhou Changle International Airport	Fuzhou Metro Binhai Express	Airport
China	Guangzhou	Guangzhou Baiyun International Airport	Guangzhou Metro Line 3	Airport North (Terminal 2)
China	Guangzhou	Guangzhou Baiyun International Airport	Guangzhou Metro Line 3	Airport South (Terminal 1)
China	Guiyang	Guiyang Longdongbao International Airport	Guiyang Metro Line 2	Longdongbao International Airport
China	Hangzhou	Hangzhou Xiaoshan International Airport	Hangzhou Metro Line 1	Xiaoshan International Airport
China	Hangzhou	Hangzhou Xiaoshan International Airport	Hangzhou Metro Line 7	Xiaoshan International Airport
China	Hangzhou	Hangzhou Xiaoshan International Airport	Hangzhou Metro Line 19	Xiaoshan International Airport
China	Hefei	Hefei Xinqiao International Airport	Hefei Metro Line S1	Xinqiao 2 Hao Hangzhanlou (Xinqiao Terminal 2)
China	Hohhot	Hohhot Baita International Airport	Hohhot Metro Line 1	Baita West
China	Hohhot	Hohhot Baita International Airport	Hohhot Metro Line 1	Bayan (Airport)
China	Jinan	Jinan Yaoqiang International Airport	Jinan Metro Line 3	Jichangnan (Jinan International Airport South)
China	Kunming	Kunming Changshui International Airport	Kunming Metro Line 6	Kunming Airport
China	Nanchang	Nanchang Changbei International Airport	Nanchang Metro Line 1	Changbei Airport
China	Nanjing	Nanjing Lukou International Airport	Nanjing Metro Line S1	Lukou International Airport
China	Ningbo	Ningbo Lishe International Airport	Ningbo Rail Transit Line 2	Lishe International Airport
China	Qingdao	Qingdao Jiaodong International Airport	Qingdao Metro Line 8	Jiaodong International Airport
China	Shanghai	Shanghai Hongqiao International Airport	Shanghai Metro Line 2	Hongqiao Airport Terminal 2
China	Shanghai	Shanghai Hongqiao International Airport	Shanghai Metro Line 2	Hongqiao Railway Station
China	Shanghai	Shanghai Hongqiao International Airport	Shanghai Metro Line 10	Hongqiao Airport Terminal 1
China	Shanghai	Shanghai Hongqiao International Airport	Shanghai Metro Line 10	Hongqiao Airport Terminal 2
China	Shanghai	Shanghai Hongqiao International Airport	Shanghai Metro Line 10	Hongqiao Railway Station
China	Shanghai	Shanghai Hongqiao International Airport	Shanghai Metro Line 17	Hongqiao Railway Station
China	Shanghai	Shanghai Pudong International Airport	Shanghai Metro Line 2	Pudong Airport Terminal 1&2
China	Shanghai	Shanghai Pudong International Airport	Shanghai Metro Maglev Line	Pudong Airport Terminal 1&2
China	Shenyang	Shenyang Taoxian International Airport	Shenyang Metro Line 2	Taoxianjichang
China	Shenzhen	Shenzhen Bao'an International Airport	Shenzhen Metro Line 11	Airport
China	Taiyuan	Taiyuan Wusu International Airport	Taiyuan Metro Line 1	Wusu 1 Hao/2 Hao Hangzhanlou
China	Tianjin	Tianjin Binhai International Airport	Tianjin Metro Line 2	Binhaiguojijichang
China	Tianshui	Tianshui Maijishan Airport	Tianshui Tram Line 1	Tianshui Jichang
China	Ürümqi	Ürümqi Tianshan International Airport	Ürümqi Metro Airport MRT	North International Airport
China	Wenzhou	Wenzhou Longwan International Airport	Wenzhou Rail Transit Line S1	Airport
China	Wenzhou	Wenzhou Longwan International Airport	Wenzhou Rail Transit Line S2	Airport
China	Wuhan	Wuhan Tianhe International Airport	Wuhan Metro Line 2	Tianhe International Airport
China	Wuxi	Wuxi Shuofang Airport	Wuxi Metro Line 3	Sunan Shuofang International Airport
China	Xi'an	Xi'an Xianyang International Airport	Xi'an Metro Line 14	Airport West (T1, T2, T3)
China	Xi'an	Xi'an Xianyang International Airport	Xi'an Metro Line 14	Airport (T5)
China	Zhengzhou	Zhengzhou Xinzheng International Airport	Zhengzhou Metro Chengjiao Line	Xinzheng International Airport
China	Zhengzhou	Zhengzhou Xinzheng International Airport	Zhengzhou Metro Zhengxu Line	Xinzheng International Airport
India	Chennai	Chennai International Airport	Chennai Metro Blue Line	Chennai International Airport
India	Delhi	Indira Gandhi International Airport	Delhi Metro Airport Express Line	IGI Airport
India	Delhi	Indira Gandhi International Airport	Delhi Metro Magenta Line	Terminal 1-IGI Airport
India	Kolkata	Netaji Subhas Chandra Bose International Airport	Kolkata Metro Yellow Line	Jai Hind (Biman Bandar)
India	Lucknow	Chaudhary Charan Singh International Airport	Lucknow Metro Red Line	Chaudhary Charan Singh International Airport
India	Mumbai	Chhatrapati Shivaji International Airport	Mumbai Metro Line 3	Chhatrapati Shivaji Maharaj International Airport - T1
India	Mumbai	Chhatrapati Shivaji International Airport	Mumbai Metro Line 3	Chhatrapati Shivaji Maharaj International Airport - T2
Indonesia	Palembang	Sultan Mahmud Badaruddin II International Airport	Palembang LRT Line 1	Bandara Sultan Mahmud Badaruddin II
Iran	Mashhad	Mashhad International Airport	Mashhad Urban Railway Line 1	Hasheminejad Airport
Iran	Tehran	Imam Khomeini International Airport	Tehran Metro Line 1	Imam Khomeini Airport
Iran	Tehran	Mehrabad International Airport	Tehran Metro Line 4	Mehrabad Airport Terminal 1 and 2
Iran	Tehran	Mehrabad International Airport	Tehran Metro Line 4	Mehrabad Airport Terminal 4 and 6
Japan	Fukuoka	Fukuoka Airport	Fukuoka City Subway Airport Line	Fukuoka Airport
Japan	Kobe	Kobe Airport	Kobe New Transit Port Island Line	Kobe Airport
Japan	Naha	Naha Airport	Okinawa Urban Monorail	Naha Airport
Japan	Osaka	Itami Airport	Osaka Monorail Main Line	Osaka Airport
Japan	Tokyo	Haneda Airport	Tokyo Monorail	Haneda Airport Terminal 1
Japan	Tokyo	Haneda Airport	Tokyo Monorail	Haneda Airport Terminal 2
Japan	Tokyo	Haneda Airport	Tokyo Monorail	Haneda Airport Terminal 3
Kazakhstan	Astana	Nursultan Nazarbayev International Airport	Astana Light Metro Line 1	Airport
Macau	Macau	Macau International Airport	Macau Light Rapid Transit Taipa Line	Airport
Qatar	Doha	Hamad International Airport	Doha Metro Red Line	Hamad International Airport T1
Saudi Arabia	Riyadh	King Khalid International Airport	Riyadh Metro Line 4	Airport T1–2
Saudi Arabia	Riyadh	King Khalid International Airport	Riyadh Metro Line 4	Airport T3–4
Saudi Arabia	Riyadh	King Khalid International Airport	Riyadh Metro Line 4	Airport T5
Singapore	Singapore	Singapore Changi Airport	Singapore MRT East–West Line	Changi Airport
South Korea	Busan	Gimhae International Airport	Busan Metro BGL Line	Gimhae Int'l Airport
South Korea	Gwangju	Gwangju Airport	Gwangju Metro Line 1	Airport
South Korea	Seoul	Gimpo International Airport	Gimpo Goldline	Gimpo Int'l Airport
South Korea	Seoul	Gimpo International Airport	Seoul Subway Line 5	Gimpo Int'l Airport
South Korea	Seoul	Gimpo International Airport	Seoul Subway Line 9	Gimpo Int'l Airport
South Korea	Seoul	Incheon International Airport	Incheon Airport Maglev	Incheon Int'l Airport T1
Taiwan	Kaohsiung	Kaohsiung International Airport	Kaohsiung Metro Red Line	Kaohsiung International Airport
Taiwan	Taipei	Taipei Songshan Airport	Taipei Metro Wenhu Line	Songshan Airport
Taiwan	Taipei	Taoyuan International Airport	Taoyuan Metro Airport Line	Airport Terminal 1
Taiwan	Taipei	Taoyuan International Airport	Taoyuan Metro Airport Line	Airport Terminal 2
Turkey	Antalya	Antalya Airport	AntRay T1	Havalimanı
Turkey	Istanbul	Istanbul Sabiha Gökçen International Airport	Istanbul Metro M4	Sabiha Gökçen Havalimanı
United Arab Emirates	Dubai	Dubai International Airport	Dubai Metro Red Line	Airport Terminal 1
United Arab Emirates	Dubai	Dubai International Airport	Dubai Metro Red Line	Airport Terminal 3

=== Europe ===
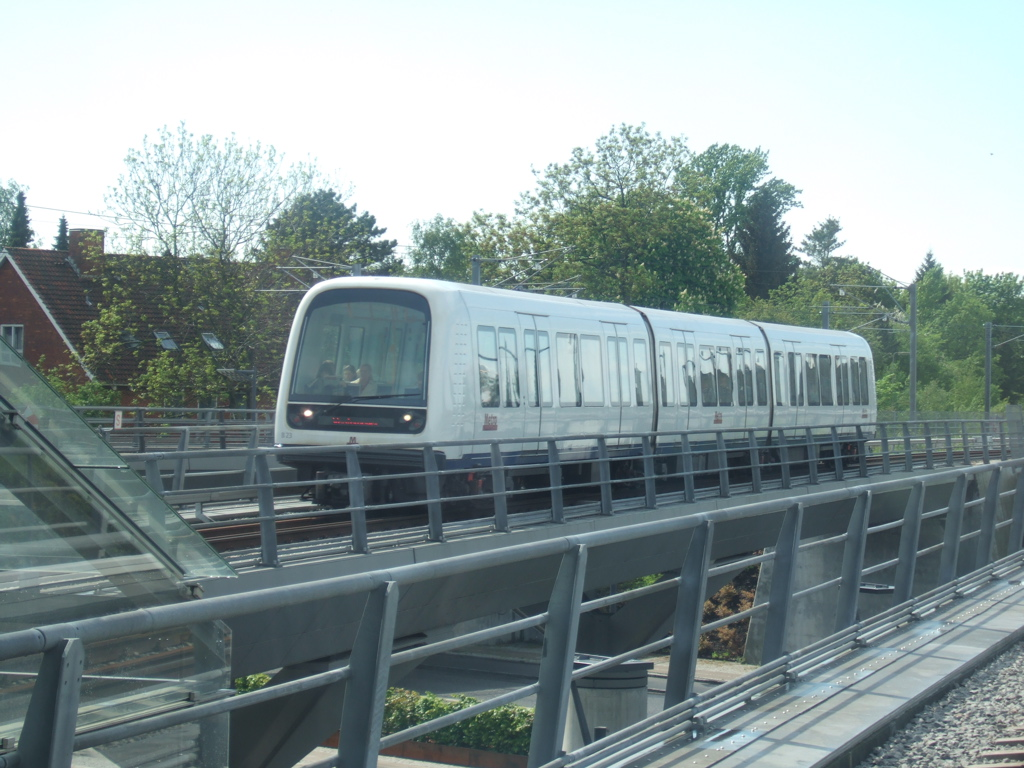
Copenhagen Metro, serving Copenhagen Airport

Country	City	Airport	Rail link	Station name
Bulgaria	Sofia	Sofia Airport	Sofia Metro Line M4	Sofia Airport
Denmark	Copenhagen	Copenhagen Airport	Copenhagen Metro Line M2	Lufthavnen
Estonia	Tallinn	Tallinn Airport	Tallinn Tram Line T2	Lennujaam
Estonia	Tallinn	Tallinn Airport	Tallinn Tram Line T4	Lennujaam
France	Bordeaux	Bordeaux Airport	Bordeaux Tramway Line A	Aéroport
France	Lyon	Lyon Aéroport	Rhônexpress	Lyon Saint-Exupéry TGV
France	Nice	Aéroport Nice Côte d'Azur	Nice Tramway Line 2	Aéroport Terminal 1
France	Nice	Aéroport Nice Côte d'Azur	Nice Tramway Line 2	Aéroport Terminal 2
France	Nice	Aéroport Nice Côte d'Azur	Nice Tramway Line 3	Aéroport Terminal 1
France	Nice	Aéroport Nice Côte d'Azur	Nice Tramway Line 3	Aéroport Terminal 2
France	Paris	Paris Orly Airport	Paris Métro Line M14	Aéroport d'Orly
France	Paris	Paris Orly Airport	Île-de-France tramway Line T7	Aéroport d'Orly
Germany	Bremen	Bremen Airport	Bremer Straßenbahn Line 6	Flughafen
Germany	Düsseldorf	Düsseldorf Airport	Düsseldorf Stadtbahn Line U80	Düsseldorf Flughafen Terminal
Germany	Düsseldorf	Düsseldorf Airport	Düsseldorf Stadtbahn Line U81	Düsseldorf Flughafen Terminal
Germany	Erfurt	Erfurt Weimar Flughafen	Erfurt Straßenbahn Line 4	Flughafen
Germany	Nuremberg	Nuremberg Airport	Nuremberg U-Bahn Line U2	Flughafen
Germany	Stuttgart	Stuttgart Airport	Stuttgart Stadtbahn Line U6	Flughafen/Messe
Greece	Athens	Athens International Airport	Athens Metro Line 3	Athens International Airport
Italy	Florence	Florence Airport	Florence Tram Line T2	Peretola Aeroporto
Italy	Milan	Milan Linate Airport	Milan Metro Line M4	Linate Aeroporto
Luxembourg	Luxembourg City	Luxembourg Airport	Luxtram Line T1	Findel - Luxembourg Airport
Norway	Bergen	Bergen Airport	Bergen Light Rail Line 1	Bergen Lufthavn
Portugal	Lisbon	Lisbon Airport	Lisbon Metro Red Line	Aeroporto
Portugal	Porto	Porto Airport	Porto Metro Line E	Aeroporto
Romania	Bucharest	Bucharest Băneasa–Aurel Vlaicu International Airport	Bucharest Tram Line 5	Aeroport Băneasa
Russia	Moscow	Vnukovo International Airport	Moscow Metro Line 8A	Aeroport Vnukovo
Spain	Barcelona	Josep Tarradellas Barcelona–El Prat Airport	Barcelona Metro Line L9 South	Aeroport T1
Spain	Barcelona	Josep Tarradellas Barcelona–El Prat Airport	Barcelona Metro Line L9 South	Aeroport T2
Spain	Madrid	Adolfo Suárez Madrid–Barajas Airport	Madrid Metro Line 8	Aeropuerto T1-T2-T3
Spain	Madrid	Adolfo Suárez Madrid–Barajas Airport	Madrid Metro Line 8	Aeropuerto T4
Spain	Valencia	Valencia Airport	Valencia Metro Line 3	Aeroport
Spain	Valencia	Valencia Airport	Valencia Metro Line 5	Aeroport
Sweden	Stockholm	Bromma Stockholm Airport	Stockholm Tram Line 31	Bromma Flygplats
Switzerland	Zürich	Zurich Airport	Zürich Tram Line 10	Zürich Flughafen
Switzerland	Zürich	Zurich Airport	Zürich Tram Line 12	Zürich Flughafen
Turkey	Istanbul	Atatürk Airport	Istanbul Metro M1	Atatürk Havalimanı
Turkey	Istanbul	Istanbul Airport	Istanbul Metro M11	İstanbul Havalimanı
United Kingdom	Edinburgh	Edinburgh Airport	Edinburgh Trams	Edinburgh Airport
United Kingdom	London	Heathrow Airport	London Underground Piccadilly Line	Heathrow Terminal 4
United Kingdom	London	Heathrow Airport	London Underground Piccadilly Line	Heathrow Terminal 5
United Kingdom	London	Heathrow Airport	London Underground Piccadilly Line	Heathrow Terminals 2 & 3
United Kingdom	London	London City Airport	Docklands Light Railway Bank–Woolwich Arsenal Route	London City Airport
United Kingdom	London	London City Airport	Docklands Light Railway Stratford International–Woolwich Arsenal Route	London City Airport
United Kingdom	Manchester	Manchester Airport	Manchester Metrolink Navy Route	Manchester Airport
United Kingdom	Newcastle	Newcastle International Airport	Tyne and Wear Metro Green Line	Airport

=== North America ===
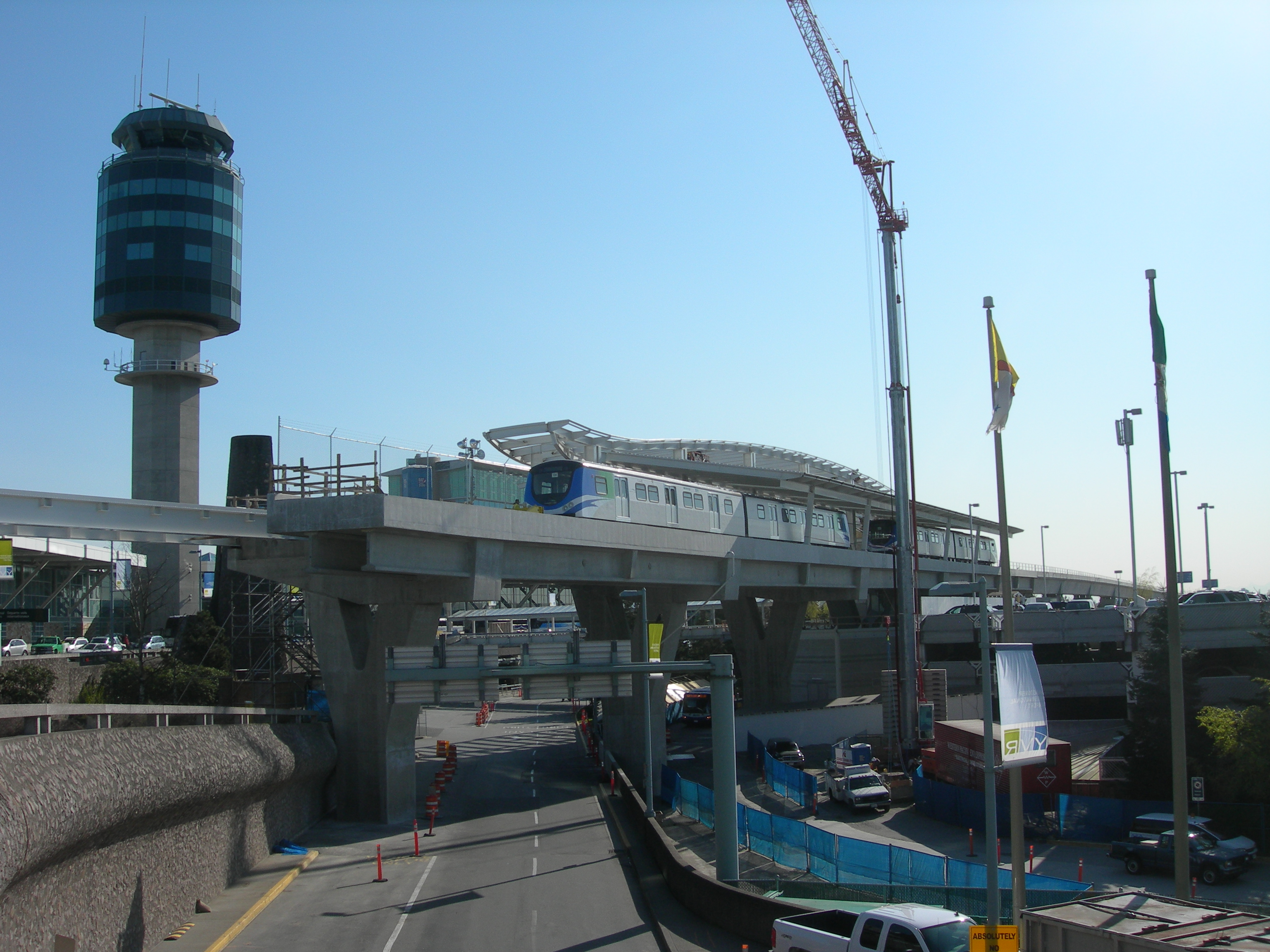
SkyTrain, serving Vancouver International Airport

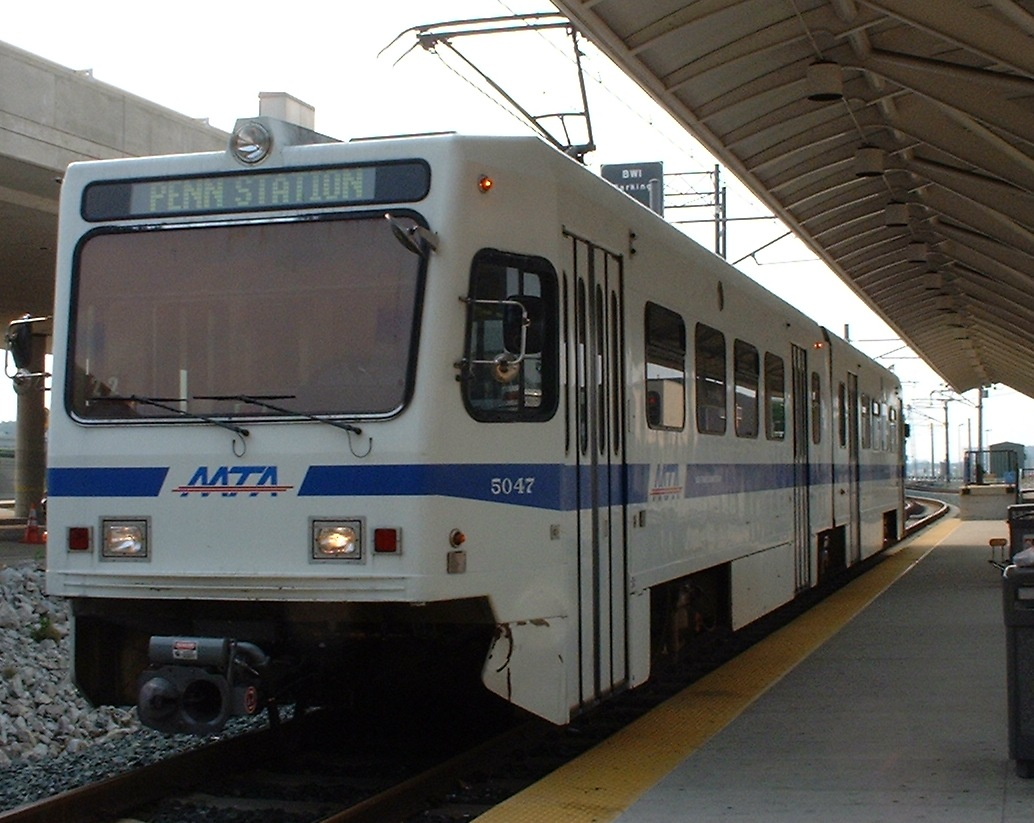
Light RailLink, serving Baltimore/Washington International Airport

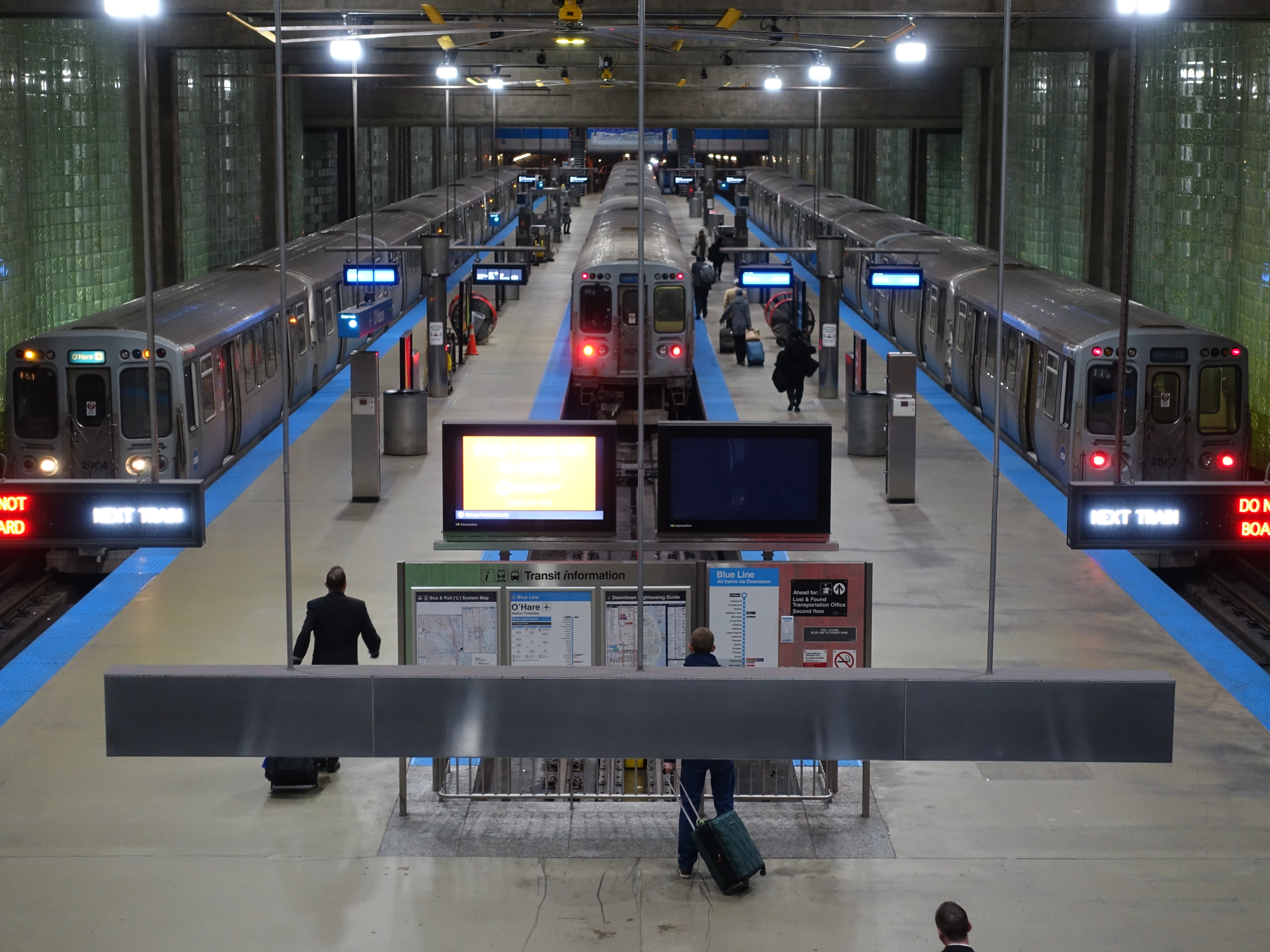
CTA, serving O'Hare International Airport

Country	City	Airport	Rail link	Station name
Canada	Ottawa	Ottawa International Airport	O-Train Line 4	Airport
Canada	Vancouver	Vancouver International Airport	SkyTrain Canada Line	YVR–Airport
Mexico	Mexico City	Aeropuerto Internacional Benito Juárez Ciudad de México	Mexico City Metro Line 5	Terminal Aérea
Panama	Panama City	Aeropuerto Internacional de Tocumen	Panama Metro Line 2	Aeropuerto
United States	Atlanta	Hartsfield–Jackson Atlanta International Airport	MARTA Red Line	Airport
United States	Atlanta	Hartsfield–Jackson Atlanta International Airport	MARTA Gold Line	Airport
United States	Baltimore	Baltimore/Washington International Airport	Light RailLink Hunt Valley to BWI Airport or Glen Burnie Line	BWI Airport
United States	Chicago	O'Hare International Airport	CTA Blue Line	O'Hare
United States	Chicago	Midway International Airport	CTA Orange Line	Midway
United States	Cleveland	Cleveland Hopkins International Airport	RTA Red Line	Airport
United States	Dallas	Dallas Fort Worth International Airport	DART Orange Line	DFW Airport Terminal A
United States	Honolulu	Daniel K. Inouye International Airport	HART Skyline	Daniel K. Inouye International Airport
United States	Minneapolis	Minneapolis–Saint Paul International Airport	METRO Blue Line	Terminal 1–Lindbergh
United States	Minneapolis	Minneapolis–Saint Paul International Airport	METRO Blue Line	Terminal 2–Humphrey
United States	Portland	Portland International Airport	MAX Red Line	Portland Airport
United States	Salt Lake City	Salt Lake City International Airport	TRAX Green Line	Airport
United States	San Francisco	San Francisco International Airport	BART Red Line	San Francisco International Airport
United States	San Francisco	San Francisco International Airport	BART Yellow Line	San Francisco International Airport
United States	Seattle	Seattle–Tacoma International Airport	Link 1 Line	SeaTac/Airport
United States	St. Louis	MidAmerica St. Louis Airport	MetroLink Red Line	MidAmerica St. Louis Airport
United States	St. Louis	St. Louis Lambert International Airport	MetroLink Red Line	Lambert Airport Terminal 1
United States	St. Louis	St. Louis Lambert International Airport	MetroLink Red Line	Lambert Airport Terminal 2
United States	Washington, D.C.	Ronald Reagan Washington National Airport	Metrorail Blue Line	Ronald Reagan Washington National Airport
United States	Washington, D.C.	Ronald Reagan Washington National Airport	Metrorail Yellow Line	Ronald Reagan Washington National Airport
United States	Washington, D.C.	Washington Dulles International Airport	Metrorail Silver Line	Washington Dulles International Airport

=== South America ===
Country	City	Airport	Rail link	Station name
Brazil	Recife	Gilberto Freyre Recife - Guararapes International Airport	Recife Metro South Line	Aeroporto
Brazil	Rio de Janeiro	Aeroporto Santos Dumont	VLT Carioca Line 1	Santos Dumont
Brazil	Rio de Janeiro	Aeroporto Santos Dumont	VLT Carioca Line 3	Santos Dumont
Brazil	São Paulo	Deputy Freitas Nobre São Paulo - Congonhas Airport	São Paulo Metro Line 17	Aeroporto de Congonhas

== Rail via people mover ==
This list contains connections from a railway station (with or without "airport" in the name) to an airport via people mover.

=== Asia ===
Country	City	Airport	Rail link	Station name
Indonesia	Jakarta	Soekarno–Hatta International Airport	Soekarno–Hatta Airport Skytrain	SHIA

=== Europe ===
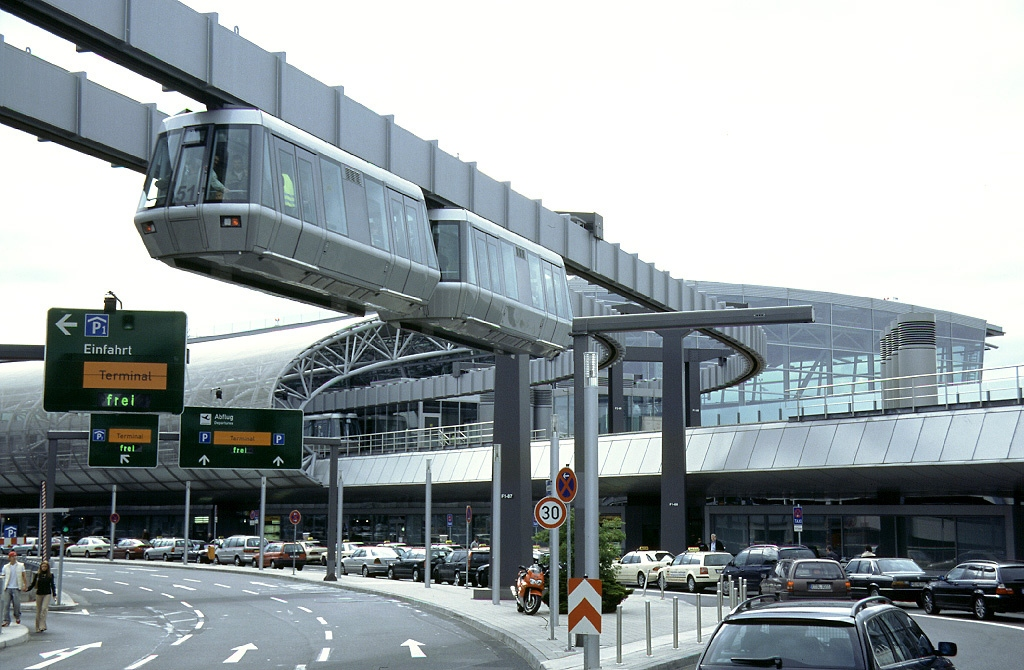
SkyTrain, serving Düsseldorf Airport

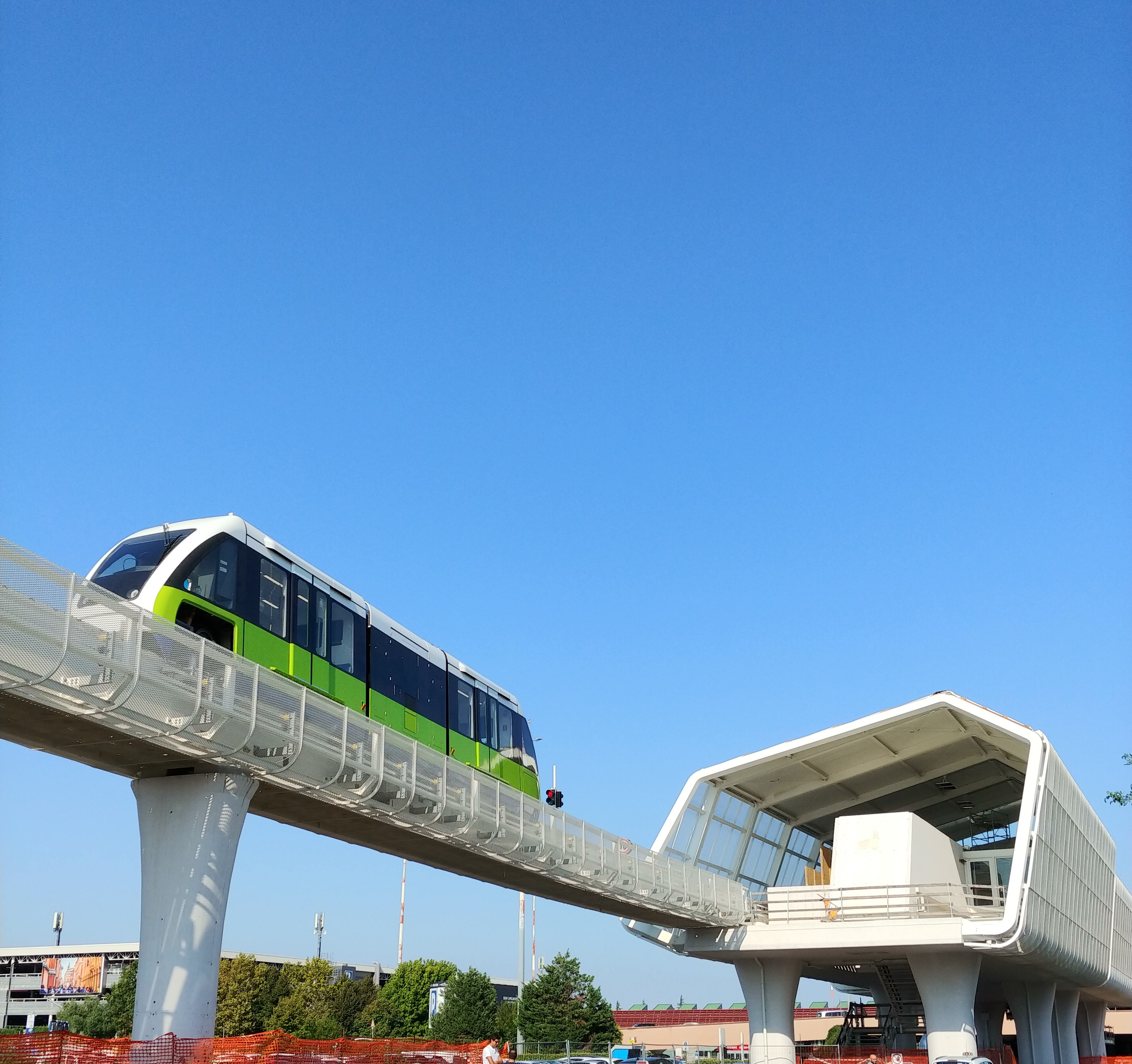
Marconi Express, serving Bologna Airport

Country	City	Airport	Rail link	Station name
France	Paris	Paris Orly Airport	Orlyval	Antony
Germany	Düsseldorf	Düsseldorf Airport	SkyTrain	Düsseldorf Flughafen
Italy	Bologna	Bologna Airport	Marconi Express	Bologna Centrale
Italy	Pisa	Pisa Airport	Pisa Mover	Pisa Centrale
United Kingdom	Birmingham	Birmingham Airport	Air-Rail Link	Birmingham International
United Kingdom	London	London Luton Airport	Luton DART	Luton Airport Parkway

=== North America ===
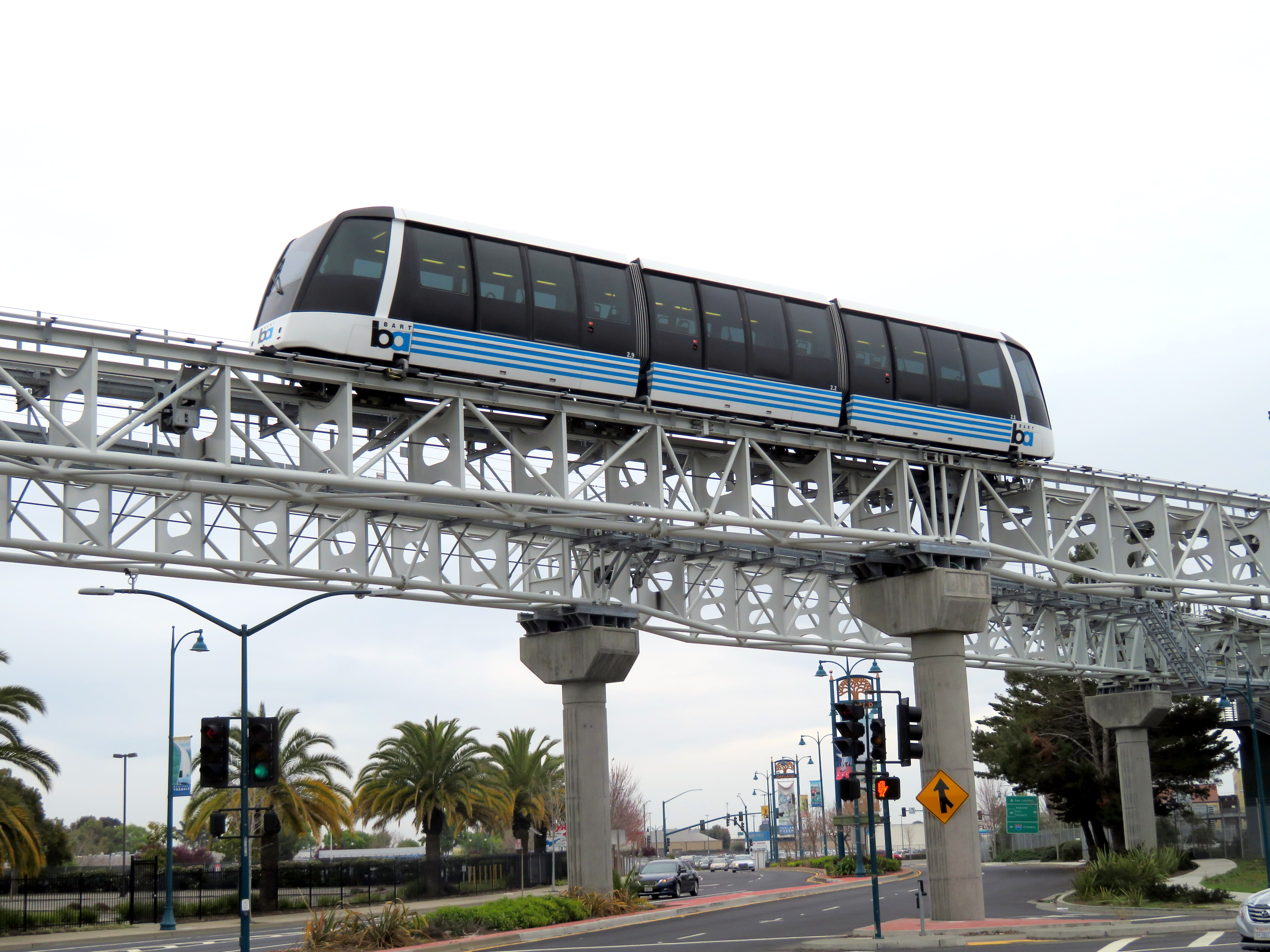
Oakland Airport Connector, serving Oakland International Airport

Country	City	Airport	Rail link	Station name
United States	Chicago	O'Hare International Airport	Airport Transit System	O'Hare Transfer
United States	Miami	Miami International Airport	MIA Mover	Miami Airport
United States	Miami	Miami International Airport	MIA Mover	Miami International Airport
United States	New York	John F. Kennedy International Airport	Howard Beach Train	Howard Beach–JFK Airport
United States	New York	John F. Kennedy International Airport	Jamaica Train	Jamaica
United States	New York	John F. Kennedy International Airport	Jamaica Train	Sutphin Blvd–Archer Av–JFK Airport
United States	Newark	Newark Liberty International Airport	AirTrain Newark	Newark Liberty International Airport
United States	Oakland	Oakland International Airport	Oakland Airport Connector	Coliseum
United States	Phoenix	Phoenix Sky Harbor International Airport	PHX Sky Train	44th St/Washington

=== South America ===
Country	City	Airport	Rail link	Station name
Brazil	São Paulo	Aeroporto Internacional de São Paulo	GRU Airport People Mover	Aeroporto–Guarulhos

== Rail via shuttle bus ==
This list contains connections from a railway station (with "airport" in the name) to an airport via shuttle bus.

=== Asia ===
Country	City	Airport	Rail link	Station name
China	Shijiazhuang	Shijiazhuang Zhengding International Airport	Shuttle bus	Zhengding Airport
China	Xuzhou	Xuzhou Guanyin International Airport	Shuttle bus	Guanyin Airport
Georgia	Kutaisi	Kutaisi International Airport	Shuttle bus	Kutaisi International Airport
India	Bengaluru	Kempegowda International Airport	Shuttle bus	Kempegowda International Airport Halt
India	Nagpur	Dr. Babasaheb Ambedkar International Airport	Shuttle bus	Airport
Japan	Hanamaki	Hanamaki Airport	Morioka-Hanamaki Airport Liner	Hanamaki-Kūkō
South Korea	Daegu	Daegu International Airport	101-1	Ayanggyo (Daegu Int'l Airport)
South Korea	Daegu	Daegu International Airport	401	Ayanggyo (Daegu Int'l Airport)
South Korea	Daegu	Daegu International Airport	Express 1	Ayanggyo (Daegu Int'l Airport)
South Korea	Daegu	Daegu International Airport	Palgong 1	Ayanggyo (Daegu Int'l Airport)

=== Europe ===
Country	City	Airport	Rail link	Station name
France	Marseille	Marseille Provence Airport	13	Vitrolles Aéroport Marseille Provence
France	Paris	Paris Orly Airport	183	Pont de Rungis Aéroport d'Orly
France	Paris	Paris Orly Airport	N22	Pont de Rungis Aéroport d'Orly
France	Paris	Paris Orly Airport	N31	Pont de Rungis Aéroport d'Orly
Norway	Sandefjord	Torp Sandefjord Airport	S174	Torp (Sandefjord Lufthavn)
United Kingdom	Cardiff	Cardiff Airport	905	Rhoose Cardiff International Airport
United Kingdom	Inverness	Inverness Airport	11	Inverness Airport
United Kingdom	Inverness	Inverness Airport	27	Inverness Airport

=== North America ===
Country	City	Airport	Rail link	Station name
Mexico	Cancún	Cancún International Airport	Conexión Intermodal Tren Maya	Cancún Aeropuerto
United States	Albuquerque	Albuquerque International Sunport	222	Bernalillo County/International Sunport
United States	Baltimore	Baltimore/Washington International Airport	75	BWI Thurgood Marshall Airport
United States	Baltimore	Baltimore/Washington International Airport	75	BWI Rail Station
United States	Baltimore	Baltimore/Washington International Airport	201	BWI Thurgood Marshall Airport
United States	Baltimore	Baltimore/Washington International Airport	201	BWI Rail Station
United States	Baltimore	Baltimore/Washington International Airport	Shuttle	BWI Thurgood Marshall Airport
United States	Baltimore	Baltimore/Washington International Airport	Shuttle	BWI Rail Station
United States	Boston	Boston Logan International Airport	22	Airport
United States	Boston	Boston Logan International Airport	33	Airport
United States	Boston	Boston Logan International Airport	55	Airport
United States	Boston	Boston Logan International Airport	66	Airport
United States	Boston	Boston Logan International Airport	88	Airport
United States	Chicago	Gary/Chicago International Airport	R1	Gary/Chicago Airport
United States	Dallas	Dallas Fort Worth International Airport	TRE LINK (31)	CentrePort/DFW Airport
United States	Dallas	Dallas Love Field	Love Link (5)	Inwood/Love Field
United States	Fort Lauderdale	Fort Lauderdale–Hollywood International Airport	Tri-Rail Airport Shuttle Bus	Fort Lauderdale Airport
United States	Los Angeles	Hollywood Burbank Airport	Shuttle bus	Burbank Airport–North
United States	Los Angeles	Los Angeles International Airport	M Metro Connector	LAX/Metro Transit Center
United States	Milwaukee	Milwaukee Mitchell International Airport	Shuttle bus	Milwaukee Airport
United States	San Jose	San José Mineta International Airport	60	Metro/Airport
United States	Santa Rosa	Charles M. Schulz–Sonoma County Airport	62	Sonoma County Airport

=== South America ===
Country	City	Airport	Rail link	Station name
Brazil	Salvador	Salvador Bahia Airport	Shuttle bus	Aeroporto

== Past ==
This list contains past rail connections.

=== Asia ===
- (Cambodia) Phnom Penh International Airport via Airport line closed in 2020.

=== Europe ===
- (Italy) Pisa Airport via Pisa Central-Pisa Airport railway closed in 2013.

== Suspended ==
This list contains suspended rail connections.

=== Asia ===
- (Malaysia) Sultan Abdul Aziz Shah Airport via KTM KL Sentral–Terminal Skypark Line is suspended as of 2027.
- (Georgia (country)) Tbilisi International Airport via Georgian Railway Airport Line is suspended as of 2027.

=== Europe ===
- (United Kingdom) Teesside International Airport via Northern is suspended as of 2027.
- (France) Toulouse–Blagnac Airport via Toulouse tramway Line T2 is suspended as of 2027.

=== South America ===
- (Brazil) Porto Alegre Airport via Metro-Airport Connection is suspended as of 2027.

== Future ==
This list contains future rail connections.

=== Africa ===
- (Algeria) Houari Boumediene Airport via Algiers Metro Line 1 is under construction and expected to open in 2027.

=== Asia ===
- (Turkey) Bursa Yenişehir Airport via YHT is under construction and expected to open in 2026.
- (China) Changchun Longjia International Airport via Changchun Rail Transit Line 9 is under construction and expected to open in 2028.
- (Philippines) Clark International Airport via North–South Commuter Railway is under construction and expected to open in 2029.
- (China) Dalian Jinzhouwan International Airport via Dalian Metro Line 1 and Line 5 is under construction and expected to open in 2027 and 2028, respectively.
- Foshan Gaoming International Airport via China Railway is under construction and expected to open in 2027.
- (China) Fuzhou Changle International Airport via Fuzhou Metro Line F2 and Line F3 is under construction and expected to open in 2027 and 2027, respectively.
- (Turkey) Istanbul Sabiha Gökçen International Airport via Istanbul Metro M10 is under construction and expected to open in 2027.
- Jinan Yaoqiang International Airport via China Railway is under construction and expected to open in 2026.
- (India) Kempegowda International Airport via Namma Metro Blue Line is under construction and expected to open in 2027.
- (Turkey) Konya Airport via KonyaRay is under construction and expected to open in 2027.
- Nanchang Changbei International Airport via China Railway is under construction and expected to open in 2027.
- (Philippines) Ninoy Aquino International Airport via Metro Manila Subway Line 9 is under construction and expected to open in 2032.
- (Malaysia) Penang International Airport via LRT Mutiara Line is under construction and expected to open in 2031.
- Shanghai Pudong International Airport via China Railway is under construction and expected to open in 2027.
- Tianjin Binhai International Airport via China Railway and Tianjin Metro Line Z2 is under construction and expected to open in 2027 and 2027, respectively.
- (China) Xiamen Xiang'an International Airport via Xiamen Metro Line 3 and Line 4 is under construction and expected to open in 2026 and 2026, respectively.

=== Europe ===
- (Romania) Bucharest Henri Coandă International Airport via Bucharest Metro Line M6 is under construction and expected to open in 2028.
- (Italy) Milan Bergamo Airport via Trenord is under construction and expected to open in 2028.
- (Italy) Naples International Airport via Naples Metro Line 1 is under construction and expected to open in 2027.
- (France) Paris Charles de Gaulle Airport via CDG Express and Paris Métro Line M17 is under construction and expected to open in 2027 and 2030, respectively.
- (France) Paris Orly Airport via Paris Métro Line M18 is under construction and expected to open in 2027.
- (Latvia) Riga Airport via Rail Baltica is under construction and expected to open in 2030.
- (Germany) Stuttgart Airport via Stuttgart–Wendlingen high-speed railway is under construction and expected to open in 2031.
- (Albania) Tirana International Airport Nënë Tereza via Durrës–Tirana railway is under construction and expected to open in 2027.
- (Italy) Venice Marco Polo Airport via Venice–Trieste railway is under construction and expected to open in 2027.

=== North America ===
- (United States) Los Angeles International Airport via SkyLink is under construction and expected to open in 2027.
- (Canada) Montréal–Trudeau International Airport via Réseau express métropolitain is under construction and expected to open in 2027.

=== Oceania ===
- (Australia) Melbourne Airport via Metro Trains Melbourne Airport Line is under construction and expected to open in 2033.
- (Australia) Western Sydney Airport via Sydney Metro Western Sydney Airport Line is under construction and expected to open in 2027.

=== South America ===
- (Peru) Jorge Chávez International Airport via Lima and Callao Metro Line 4 is under construction and expected to open in 2028.

== See also ==
- Airport rail link
- List of airport railway stations
- List of airport people mover systems
