= Guiyang railway loop line =

Railway line in Guiyang, China

Guiyang railway loop line 贵阳市域快铁环线
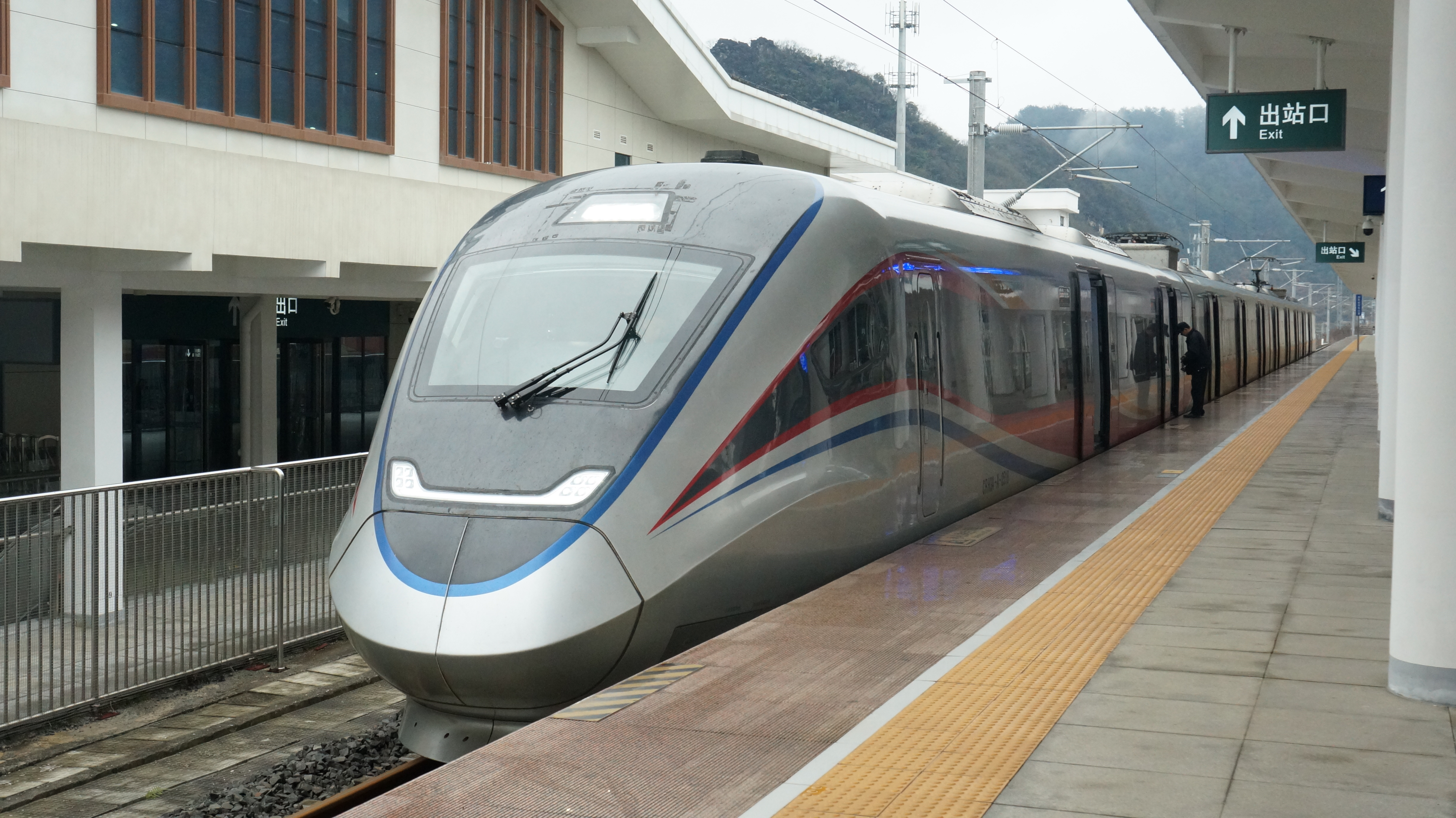
- A CRH3A-A at Huaxi South station

Overview
- Status: Operational
- Locale: Guiyang, Guizhou Province, China
- Termini: Loop Line
- Stations: 17

Service
- Type: Higher-speed rail
- Operator(s): China Railway Chengdu Group

History
- Opened: March 30, 2022 (Passenger service)

Technical
- Line length: 113 km (70 mi)
- Track gauge: 1,435 mm (4 ft 8 1/2 in) standard gauge
- Operating speed: 160-200 km/h

The Guiyang railway loop line is a higher-speed railway in Guiyang, Guizhou Province, China.

== Description ==
It completes a ring of railways around Guiyang. The entire loop line is 113 km in length with 17 stations. It is operated by China Railway Chengdu Group.

== History ==
Construction began in September 2016. The freight service started on January 11, 2022. The passenger service started on March 30, 2022.

== Stations ==
List of stations on the loop line:

Station Name	Chinese	Metro transfers/connections
Guiyang North (Guiyangbei)	贵阳北	1
Baiyun North (Baiyunbei)	白云北	
Baiyun West (Baiyunxi)	白云西	
Jinyang	金阳	1 (via Laowantang)
Jinyang South (Jinyangnan)	金阳南	
Jinhuazhen	金华镇	
Huaxi West (Huaxixi)	花溪西	
Gui'an	贵安	S1
Luguan	芦官	
Huchao East (Huchaodong)	湖潮东	
Tianhetan	天河潭	
Dangwu	党武	
Huaxidaxuecheng	花溪大学城	
Huaxi South (Huaxinan)	花溪南	3
Mengguan	孟关	
Shuanglong South (Shuanglongnan)	双龙南	
Guiyang	贵阳	1
Guiyang North (Guiyangbei)	贵阳北	1
