= Guiyang railway station =

Railway station in Guiyang, China

Guiyang 贵阳
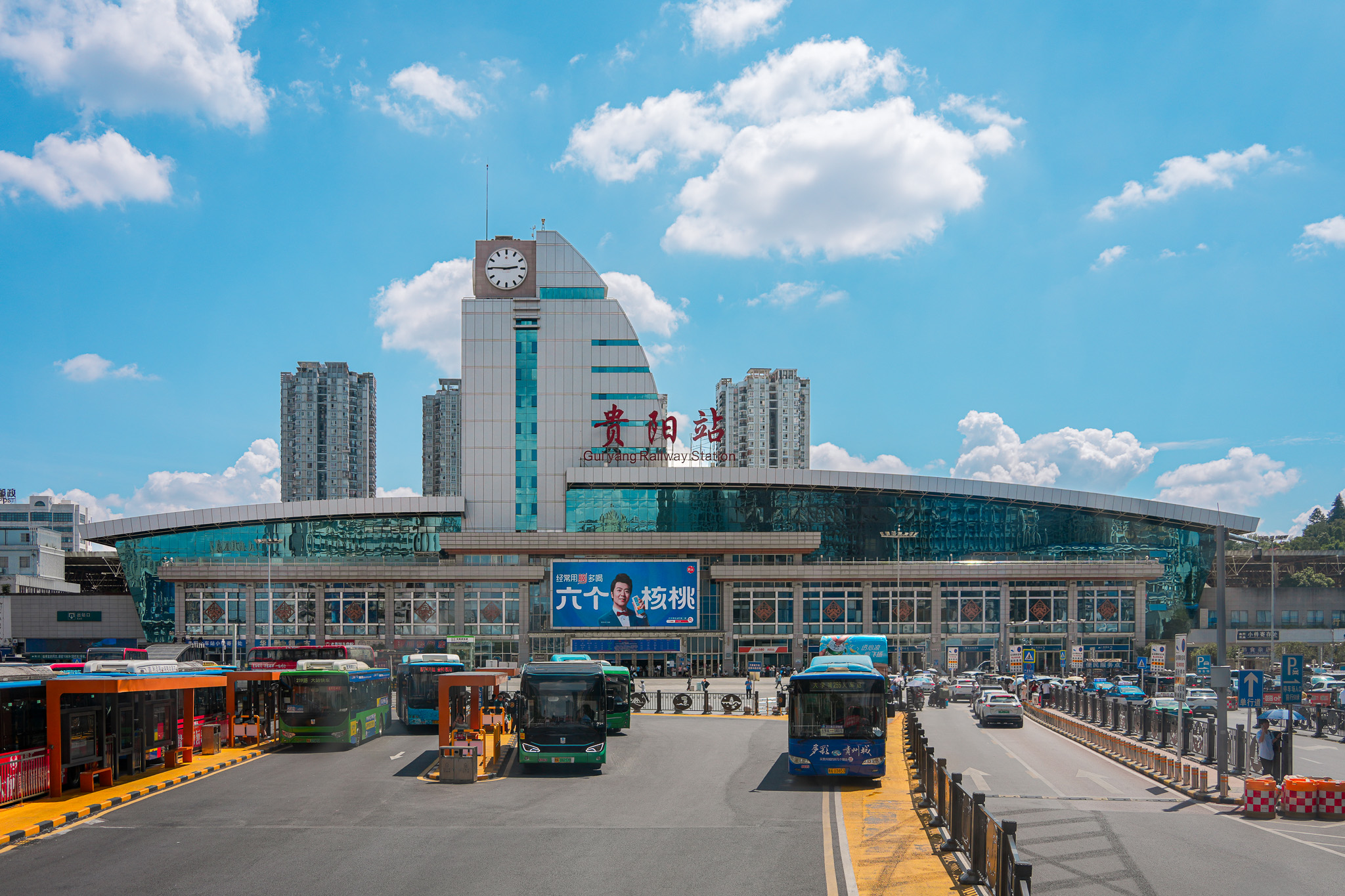

General information
- Location: Nanming District, Guiyang, Guizhou; China
- Coordinates: 26.5604°N 106.6993°E
- Lines: Shanghai–Kunming railway Sichuan–Guizhou railway Guizhou–Guangxi railway

History
- Opened: 1959
Location

Guiyang railway station is a railway station in Nanming District, Guiyang, Guizhou, China. It is also a stop on Line 1 of the Guiyang Metro.

This station handles all conventional or low-speed passenger trains that serve Guiyang. High-speed trains use Guiyang North and/or Guiyang East.

== History ==
The station was opened in 1959. The station was demolished and rebuilt in 2000, the new building was opened on 30 December.

Preceding station	China Railway	Following station
Guiding towards Shanghai or Shanghai South	Shanghai–Kunming railway	Gaofeng towards Kunming
Terminus	Guizhou–Guangxi railway	Longli towards Liuzhou
