= Line S1 (Guiyang Metro) =

Metro line in Guiyang, China

- S1
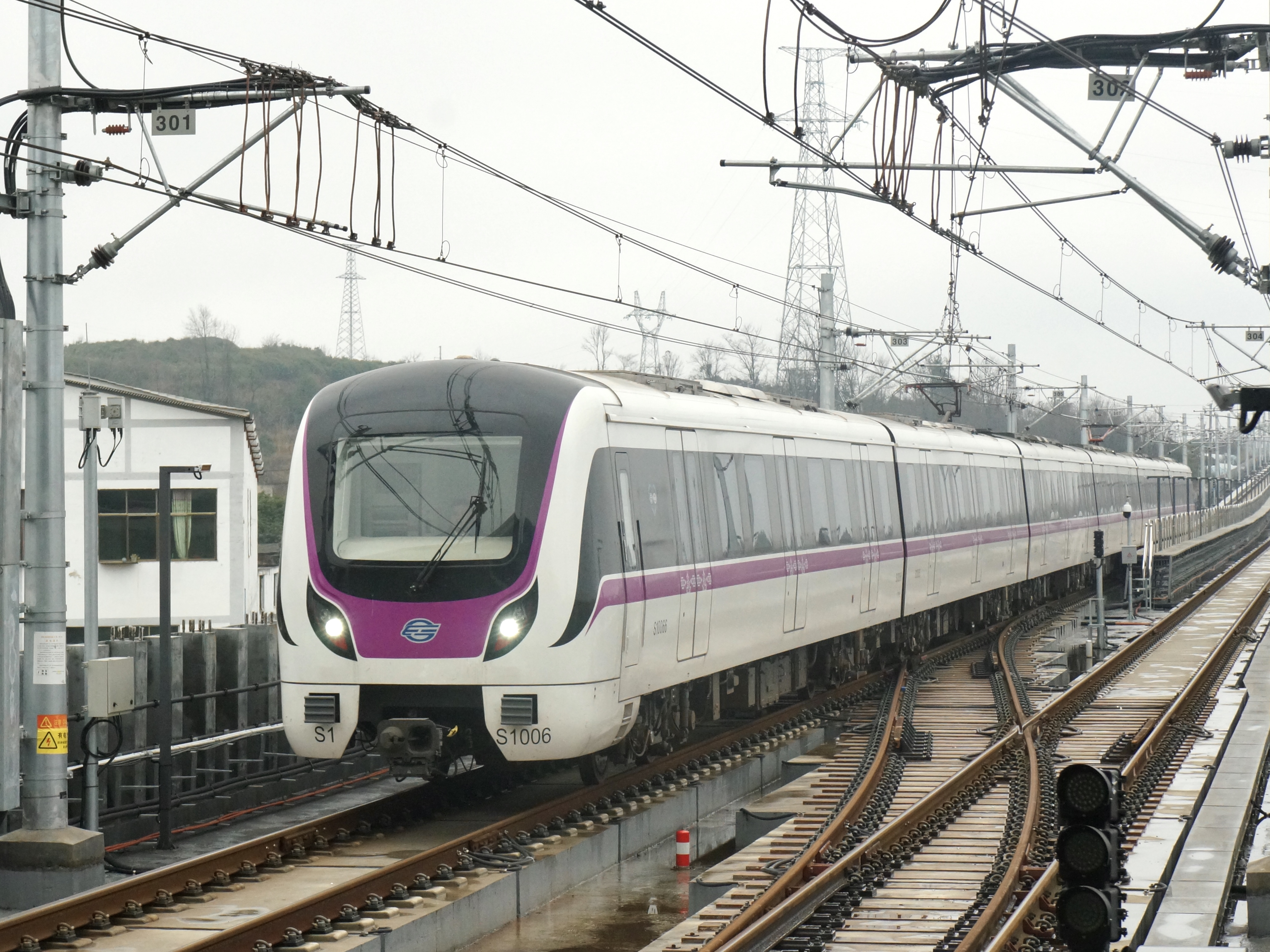

Overview
- Native name: 贵阳轨道交通S1线
- Status: Operational
- Locale: Guiyang, Guizhou Province, China
- Termini: Zaojiaoba; Wangchengpo
- Stations: 13

Service
- Type: Rapid transit
- System: Guiyang Metro
- Operator(s): Guiyang Urban Rail Transit (GYURT)
- Depot(s): Zaojiaoba & Shiban

History
- Opened: 28 December 2024; 3 months ago

Technical
- Line length: 30.32 km (18.84 mi)
- Number of tracks: 2
- Character: Underground & elevated
- Track gauge: 1,435 mm (4 ft 8 1/2 in)
- Electrification: 1500 V DC with overhead catenary
- Operating speed: 100 km/h

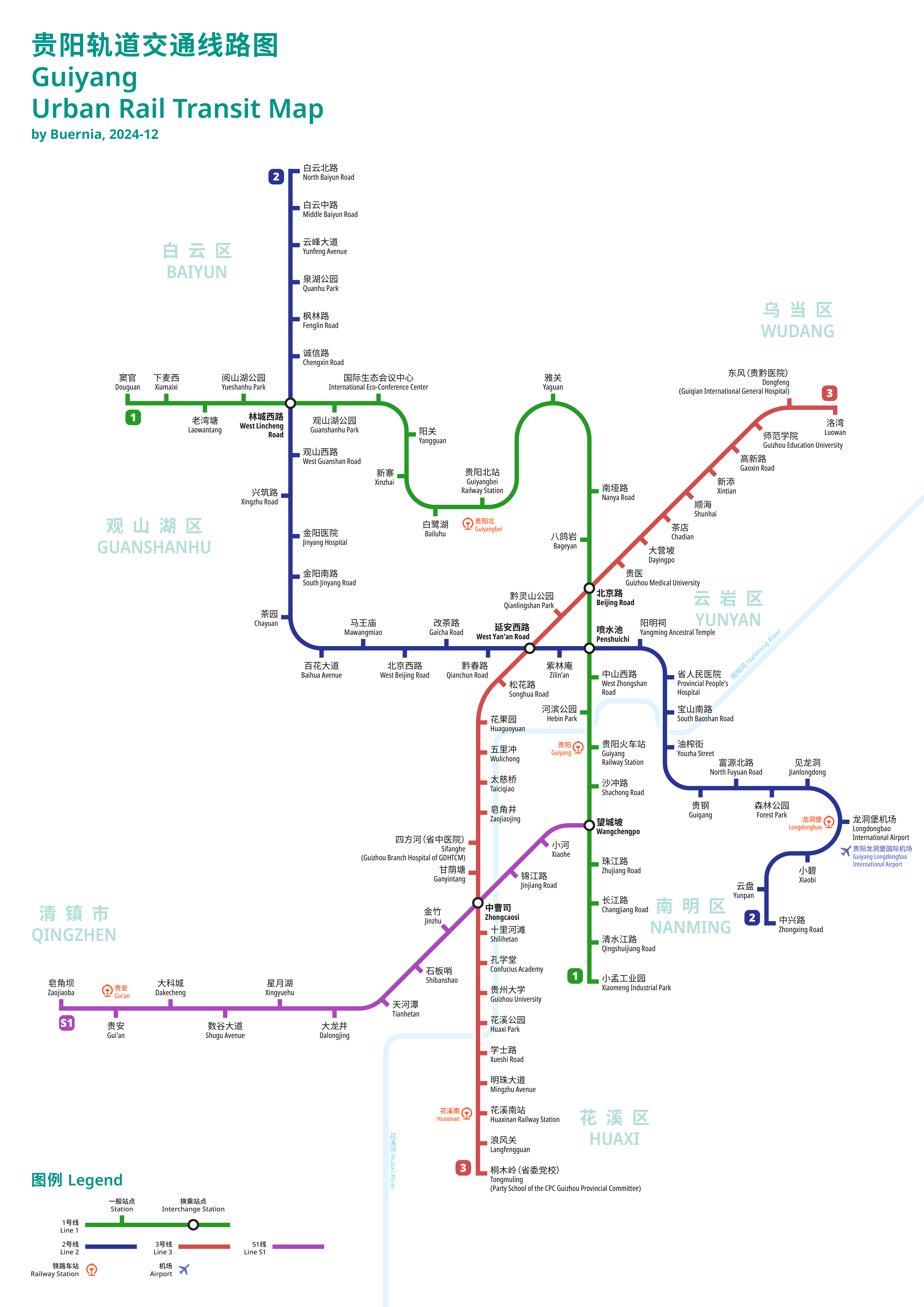
Current plan map of Guiyang Metro

Line S1 of the Guiyang Metro (Chinese: 贵阳轨道交通S1线) is a rapid transit line in Guiyang, Guizhou, China. It is 30.32 kilometres (18.84 mi) long and has 13 stations, including 22.64 km underground section and 7.68 km elevated section. 11 stations are located underground and 2 are on viaduct.

== History ==
Construction began on 30 December 2016. The line was opened on 28 December 2024.

== Stations ==
station name		Connections	Location
English	Chinese	Connections	Location
Zaojiaoba	皂角坝		Qingzhen (Gui'an New District)
Gui'an	贵安	GAE Guiyang Loop Line	Huaxi (Gui'an New District)
Dakecheng	大科城		Huaxi (Gui'an New District)
Shugu Avenue	数谷大道		Huaxi (Gui'an New District)
Xingyuehu	星月湖		Huaxi (Gui'an New District)
Dalongjing	大龙井		Huaxi (Gui'an New District)
Tianhetan	天河潭		Huaxi
Shibanshao	石板哨		Huaxi
Jinzhu	金竹		Huaxi
Zhongcaosi	中曹司	3	Huaxi
Jinjiang Road	锦江路		Huaxi
Xiaohe	小河		Huaxi
Wangchengpo	望城坡	1	Nanming
