= Baiyun North railway station =

Railway station in Guiyang, Guizhou

Baiyun North 白云北

General information
- Location: Baiyun District, Guiyang, Guizhou; China
- Coordinates: 26°42′23.89″N 106°39′32.73″E
- Line: Chengdu–Guiyang high-speed railway

History
- Opened: 30 December 2019
Location

Baiyun North railway station (Chinese: 白云北站) is a railway station in Baiyun District, Guiyang, Guizhou, China. It is an intermediate stop on the Chengdu–Guiyang high-speed railway. It opened on 30 December 2019. The station became a stop on the Guiyang railway loop line when passenger services opened on that line on 30 March 2022.

Preceding station	China Railway High-speed	Following station
Qingzhen West towards Chengdu East	Chengdu–Guiyang high-speed railway	Guiyang East towards Guiyang North or Guiyang East
