= Longdongbao railway station =

Railway station in Guiyang, China

Longdongbao 龙洞堡站
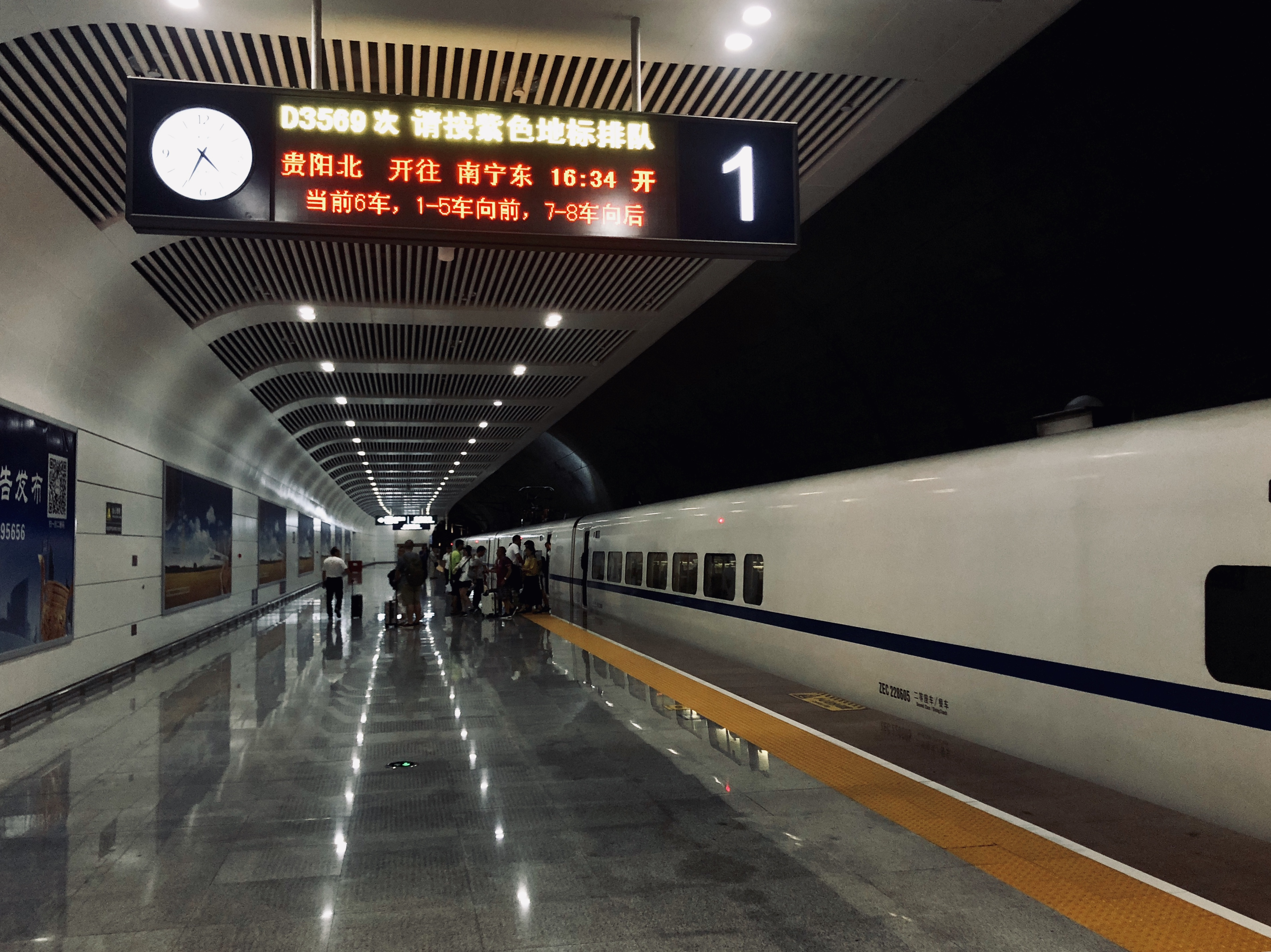

General information
- Location: Nanming District, Guiyang, Guizhou Province; China
- Coordinates: 26.5455°N 106.7957°E
- System: High-speed rail
- Line: Guiyang–Guangzhou high-speed railway
- Connections: Guiyang Longdongbao International Airport; 2 : Longdongbao International Airport station

History
- Opened: 20 September 2015
Location

Longdongbao railway station is a railway station in Nanming District, Guiyang, Guizhou Province, People's Republic of China. It is situated underneath Guiyang Longdongbao International Airport, which it serves.

== See also ==
- Longdongbao International Airport station on Line 2 (Guiyang Metro)
- Guiyang East railway station
- Guiyang North railway station
