= Guiyang Metro =

Metro system in Guiyang, China

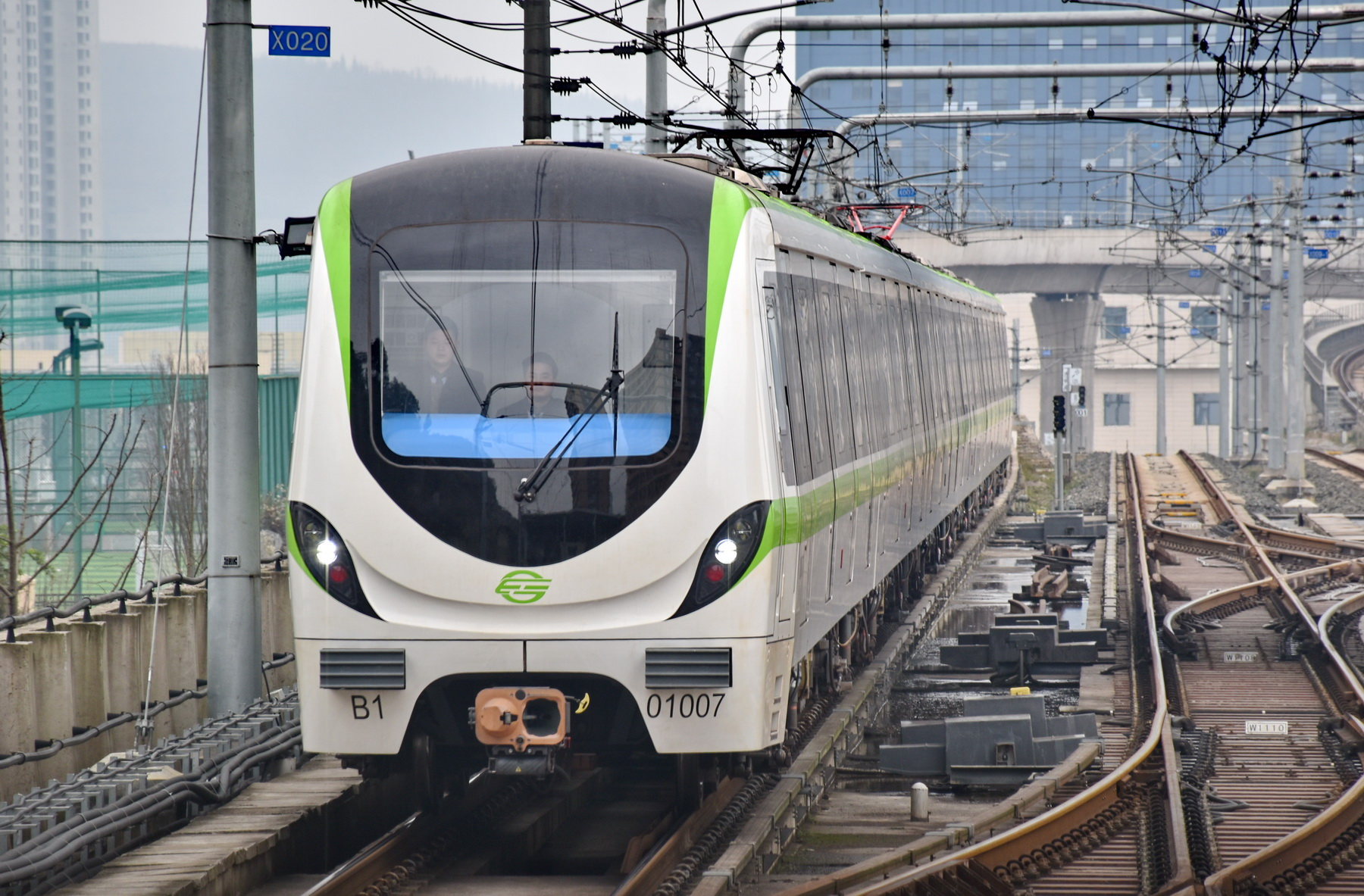

Overview
- Owner: Guiyang Urban Rail Transit Co., Ltd
- Area served: Baiyun District; Guanshanhu District; Yunyan District; Nanming District; Huaxi District; Wudang District
- Locale: Guiyang, Guizhou Province, China
- Transit type: Rapid transit
- Number of lines: 4
- Number of stations: 93
- Website: www.gyurt.com

Operation
- Began operation: December 28, 2017; 8 years ago
- Operator: Guiyang Urban Rail Transit Corporation

Technical
- System length: 149 km (93 mi)
- Track gauge: 1,435 mm (4 ft 8 1/2 in) standard gauge
- Electrification: 1500 V overhead line
- Average speed: 80 km/h (50 mph)
System map
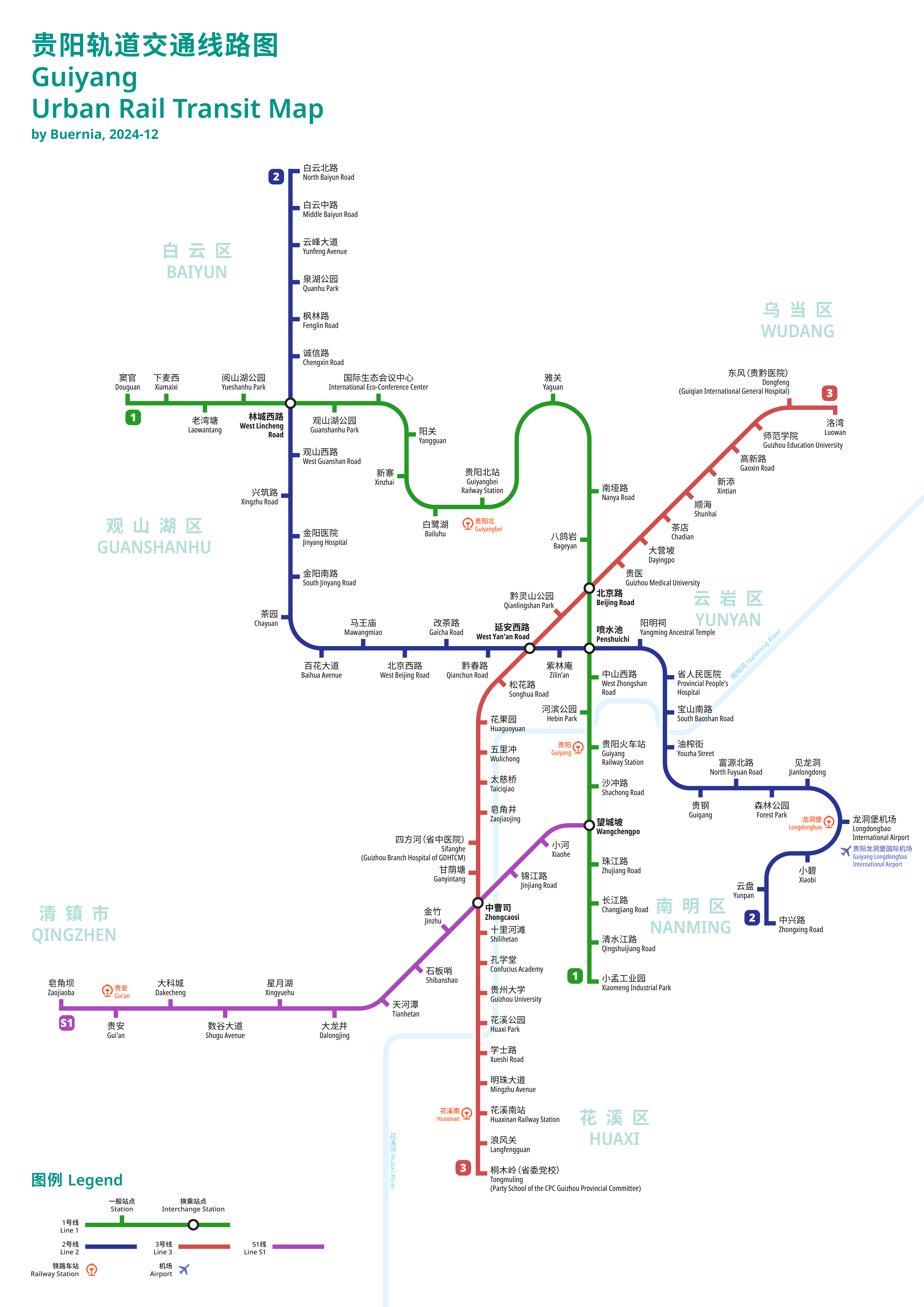

The Guiyang Metro is a rapid transit system in the city of Guiyang, Guizhou province, China. It is operated and branded as Guiyang Urban Rail Transit (GYURT).

A short northern section of Line 1 opened on 28 December 2017, with the full line entering operation on 1 December 2018. Line 2 opened on 28 April 2021. Line 3 opened on 16 December 2023. Line S1 opened on 28 December 2024. Line T2, a tram line, is also under construction.

== Fares ==
Fares are determined based on the distance traveled, with a maximum fare of RMB 8, and a minimum fare of RMB 2. Children under 1.3 meters in height ride for free, while other children pay half-price. Individuals over 70 years old enjoy free travel on public transportation in Guiyang.

Distance	Fare	Annotations
< 4km	RMB 2	
4 - 12 km (4km not included)	RMB 3 / 4	RMB +1 for every 4 km traveled after the first 4 km(if the extra distance does not reach the full 4 km fares will still increase by RMB 1)
12 - 24 km (12km not included)	RMB 5 / 6	RMB +1 for every 6 km after traveling the first 12 km (if the extra distance does not reach the full 6 km fares will still increase by RMB 1)
> 24km	RMB 7 / 8	RMB +1 for every 8 km after first 24 km traveled (if the extra distance does not reach the full 8 km fares will still increase by RMB 1)

== Rolling stock ==
Lines 1, 2, 3, S1 utilize 6 car Type-B trains manufactured by CRRC Nanjing Puzhen. Tram line Line T2 will utilize rubber-tyred trams manufactured by BYD Company (similar to the Line 1 (Pingshan SkyShuttle) in Shenzhen).

== Lines in operation ==
Lines of Guiyang Metro

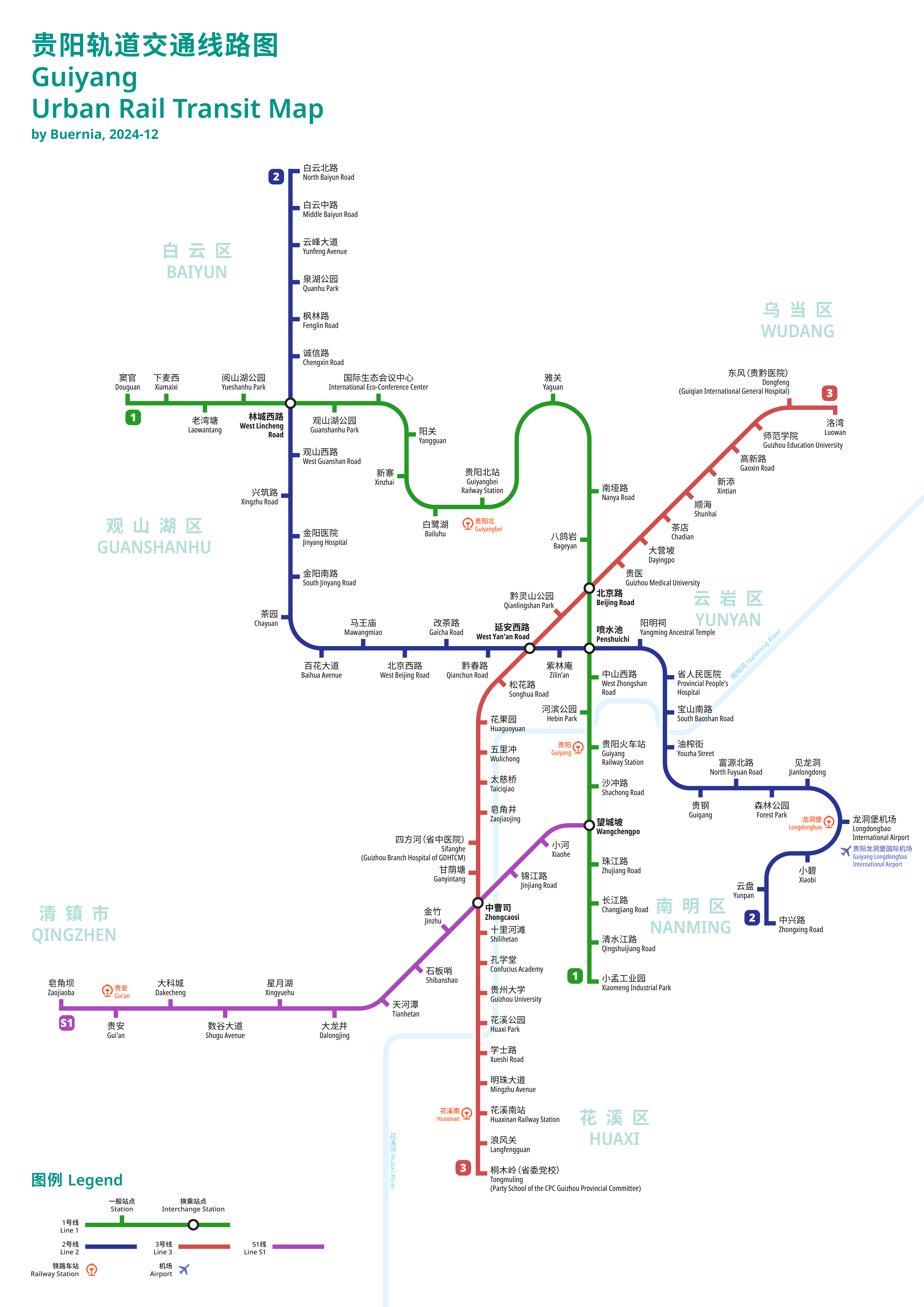
Map of Guiyang Metro

Line	Terminals (District)		Commencement	Newest Extension	Length km	Stations
1	Douguan (Guanshanhu)	Xiaomeng Industrial Park (Huaxi)	December 28, 2017	December 28, 2019	35.11	25
2	North Baiyun Road (Baiyun)	Zhongxing Road (Nanming)	April 28, 2021		40.6	32
3	Luowan (Wudang)	Tongmuling (Huaxi)	December 16, 2023		43.03	29
S1	Wangchengpo (Nanming)	Zaojiaoba (Qingzhen)	December 28, 2024		30.3	13
Total					149.0	99

=== Line 1 ===
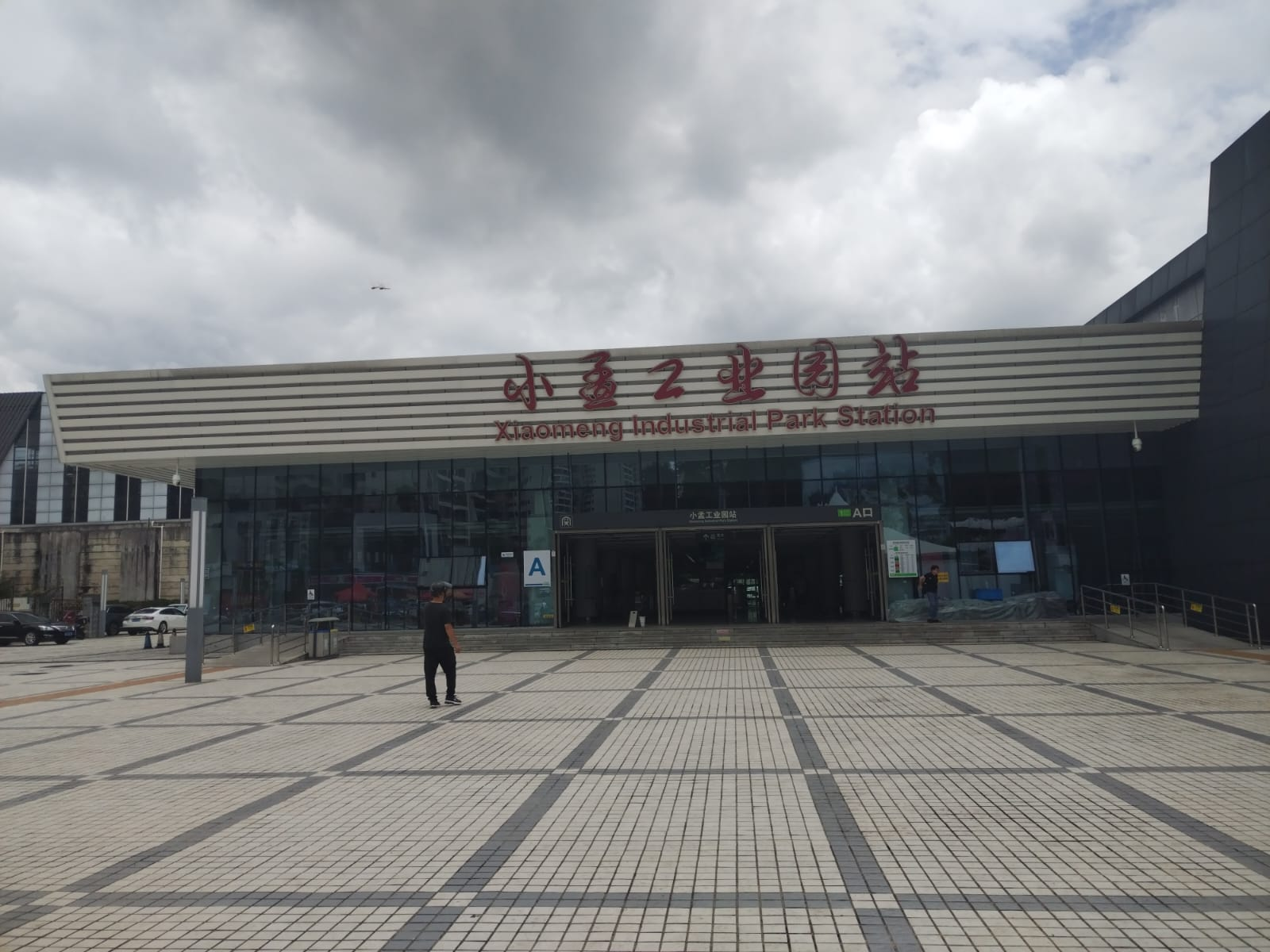
Exit A of XiaoMeng Industrial Park Station

Line 1 was approved for construction on 6 May 2013, and approved for plan in 2006. The line goes through Guanshanhu, Yunyan, Nanming and Huaxi Districts. The line twice crosses Nanming River and connects the downtown area with a number of outlying districts. The line depots are Xiaohe Depot and Guanshanhu Depot. The railway electrification system uses an overhead line. Line 1 runs northwest to south.

=== Line 2 ===
Line 2 is 40.6 km with 32 stations, including 30 underground stations and 2 elevated stations. Line 2 runs north to southeast. It opened on April 28, 2021.

=== Line 3 ===
The first phase of Line 3 is 43.03 km in length and has 29 stations. Line 3 runs from northeast to south. It opened on 16 December 2023.

=== Line S1 ===
The first phase of Line S1 opened in 2024. It is 30.32 km in length, including a 22.64 km underground section and 7.68 km elevated section.

== Lines under construction ==
=== Line T2 ===
The first phase of tram line Line T2 is under construction. It will be 10.92 km in length, with 13 stations, using BYD SkyShuttle technology. It is expected to open in 2027.

== Future development ==
Lines 4, S2, S3, S4, and Line G1 which passes through the Gui'an New Area, are in the planning stage.

== See also ==
- List of metro systems
- Urban rail transit in China
