= Line 3 (Guiyang Metro) =

Metro line in Guiyang, China

- 3

Overview
- Native name: 贵阳轨道交通3号线
- Status: Operational
- Locale: Guiyang, Guizhou Province, China
- Termini: Tongmuling (Party School of the CPC Guizhou Provincial Committee); Luowan
- Stations: 29

Service
- Type: Rapid transit
- System: Guiyang Metro
- Operator(s): Guiyang Rail Transit Line 3 Construction and Operation Co., Ltd.
- Depot(s): Dongfengzhen & Huaxinan

History
- Opened: 16 December 2023; 2 years ago

Technical
- Line length: 43.03 km (26.74 mi)
- Number of tracks: 2
- Character: Underground
- Track gauge: 1,435 mm (4 ft 8 1/2 in)
- Electrification: 1500 V DC with overhead catenary
- Operating speed: 100 km/h

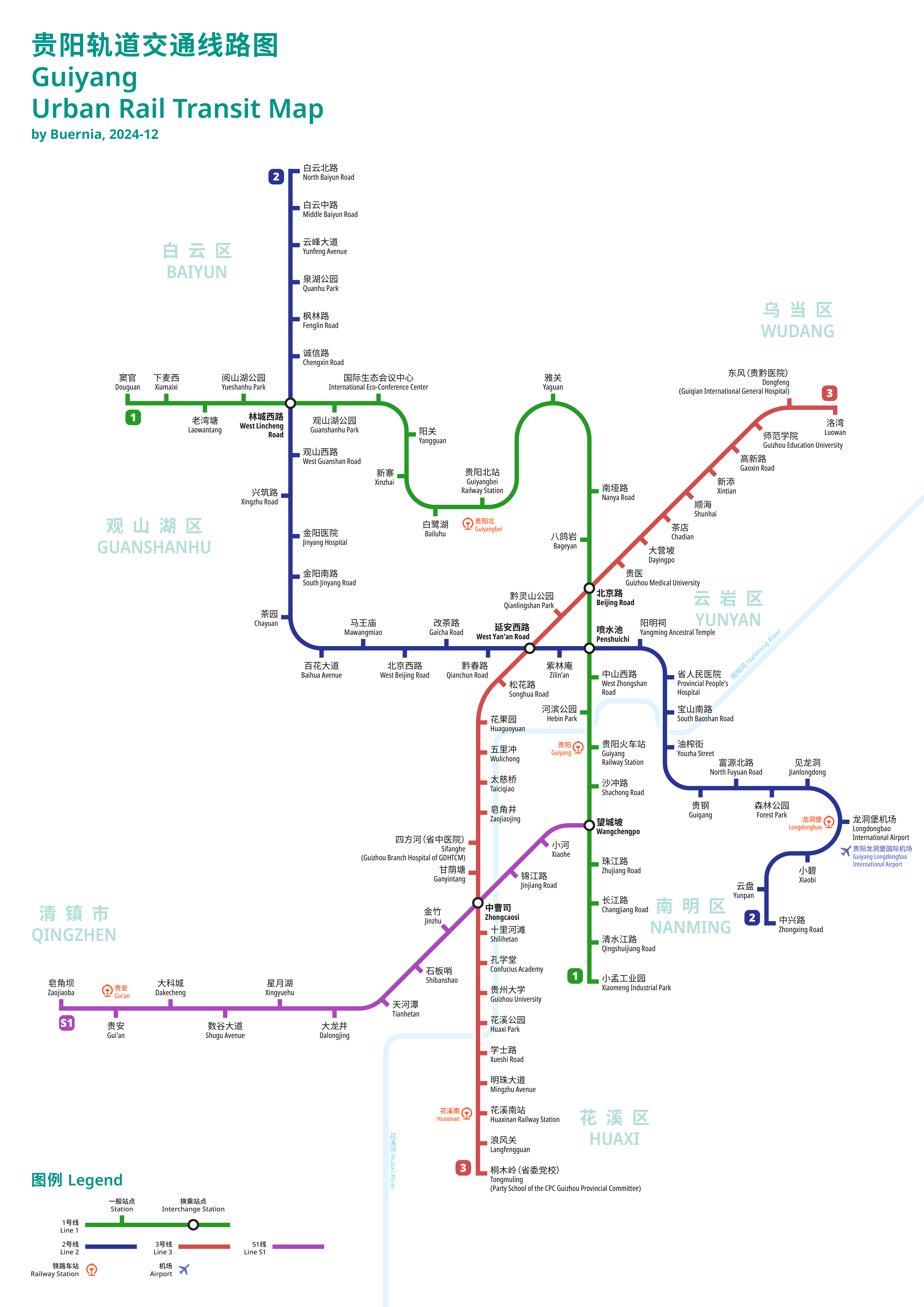
Current plan map of Guiyang Metro

Line 3 of the Guiyang Metro (Chinese: 贵阳轨道交通3号线) is a rapid transit line in Guiyang, Guizhou, China. It is 43.03 kilometres (26.74 mi) long and has 29 stations. All stations are located underground.

Line 3 is operated by Guiyang Rail Transit Line 3 Construction and Operation Co., Ltd., a consortium between China Railway Group (hold 34%), Guiyang Public Transport Investment and Operation Group Co., Ltd (hold 16.5%) and other entities under PPP contract. It's responsible for investment, construction, operation and maintenance of Line 3, with a concession period of 25 years effective from December 16, 2023.

== History ==
Construction began on 30 December 2018. The line opened on 16 December 2023.

=== Opening timeline ===
Segment	Commencement	Length	Station(s)	Ref
Tongmuling (Party School of the CPC Guizhou Provincial Committee) — Luowan	16 December 2023	43.03 km (26.74 mi)	29	

== Stations ==
station name		Connections	Location
English	Chinese	Connections	Location
Tongmuling (Party School of the CPC Guizhou Provincial Committee)	桐木岭（省委党校）		Huaxi
Langfengguan	浪风关		Huaxi
Huaxinan Railway Station	花溪南站	Huaxi South	Huaxi
Mingzhu Avenue	明珠大道		Huaxi
Xueshi Road	学士路		Huaxi
Huaxi Park	花溪公园		Huaxi
Guizhou University	贵州大学		Huaxi
Confucius Academy	孔学堂		Huaxi
Shilihetan	十里河滩		Huaxi
Zhongcaosi	中曹司	S1	Huaxi
Ganyintang	甘荫塘		Nanming
Sifanghe (Guizhou Branch Hospital of Guangdong Provincial Hospital of Traditional Chinese Medicine)	四方河（省中医院）		Nanming
Zaojiaojing	皂角井		Nanming
Taiciqiao	太慈桥		Nanming
Wulichong	五里冲		Nanming
Huaguoyuan	花果园		Nanming
Songhua Road	松花路		Nanming/Yunyan
West Yan'an Road	延安西路	2	Yunyan
Qianlingshan Park	黔灵山公园		Yunyan
Beijing Road	北京路	1	Yunyan
Guizhou Medical University	贵医		Yunyan
Dayingpo	大营坡		Yunyan
Chadian	茶店		Yunyan
Shunhai	顺海		Wudang
Xintian	新添		Wudang
Gaoxin Road	高新路		Wudang
Guizhou Education University	师范学院		Wudang
Dongfeng (Guiqian International General Hospital)	东风（贵黔医院）		Wudang
Luowan	洛湾		Wudang
