= Line 2 (Guiyang Metro) =

Metro line in Guiyang, China

- 2
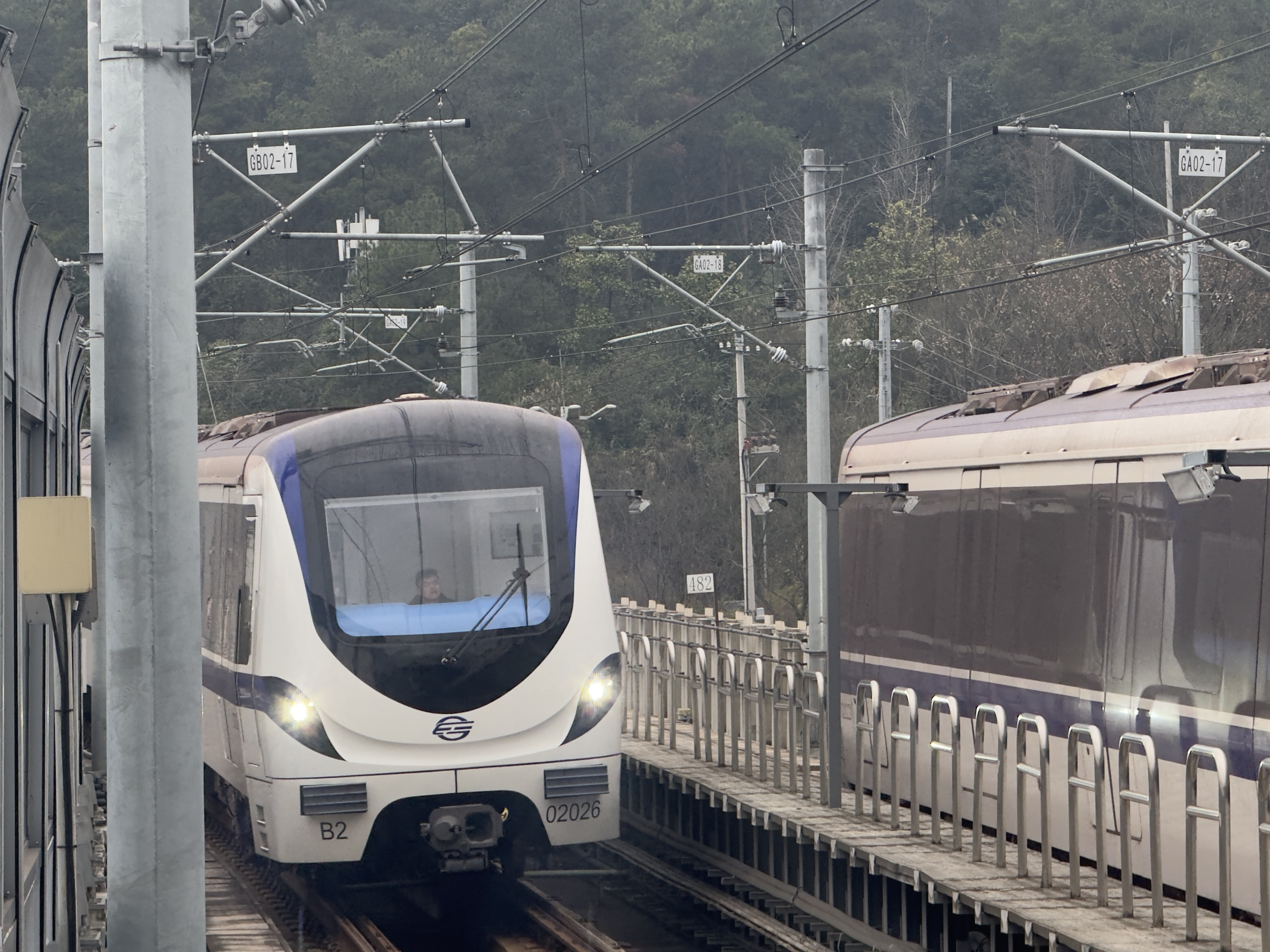

Overview
- Native name: 贵阳轨道交通2号线
- Status: Operational
- Locale: Guiyang, Guizhou Province, China
- Termini: North Baiyun Road; Zhongxing Road
- Stations: 32

Service
- Type: Rapid transit
- System: Guiyang Metro
- Operator: Guiyang Urban Rail Transit (GYURT)

History
- Opened: 28 April 2021; 5 years ago

Technical
- Line length: 40.6 km (25.23 mi)
- Number of tracks: 2
- Character: Underground & Elevated
- Track gauge: 1,435 mm (4 ft 8 1/2 in)

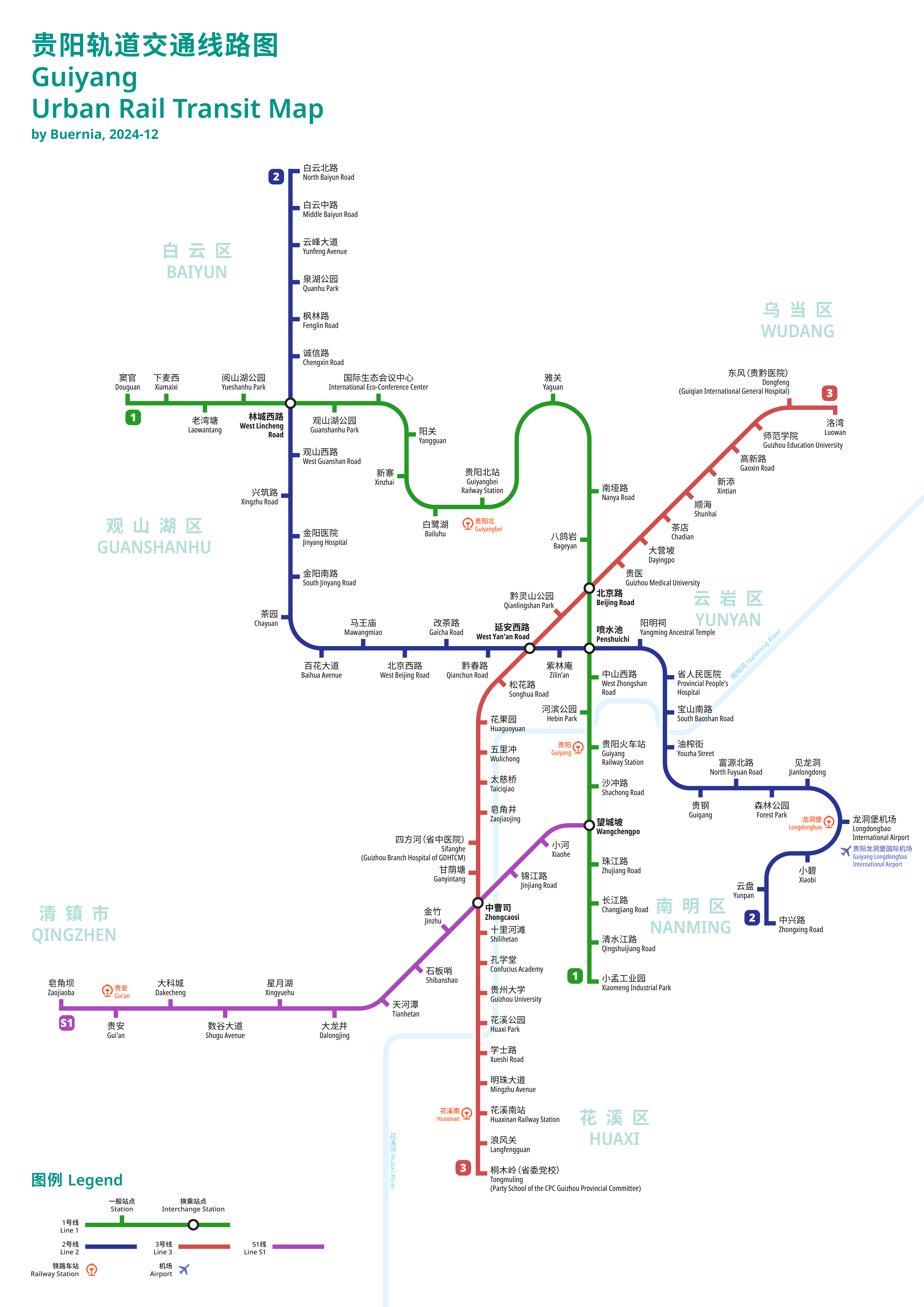
Current plan map of Guiyang Metro

Line 2 of the Guiyang Metro (Chinese: 贵阳轨道交通2号线) is a rapid transit line in Guiyang, Guizhou, China. It is 40.6 kilometres (25.2 mi) long and has 32 stations.

== History ==
Construction began in September 2015. The line opened on 28 April 2021.

=== Opening timeline ===
Segment	Commencement	Length	Station(s)	Ref
North Baiyun Road — Zhongxing Road	28 April 2021	40.6 km (25.23 mi)	32	

== Stations ==
Route of Line 2

station name		Connections	Location
English	Chinese	Connections	Location
North Baiyun Road	白云北路		Baiyun
Middle Baiyun Road	白云中路		Baiyun
Yunfeng Avenue	云峰大道		Baiyun
Quanhu Park	泉湖公园		Baiyun
Fenglin Road	枫林路		Guanshanhu
Chengxin Road	诚信路		Guanshanhu
West Lincheng Road	林城西路	1	Guanshanhu
West Guanshan Road	观山西路		Guanshanhu
Xingzhu Road	兴筑路		Guanshanhu
Jinyang Hospital	金阳医院		Guanshanhu
South Jinyang Road	金阳南路		Guanshanhu
Chayuan	茶园		Yunyan
Baihua Avenue	百花大道		Yunyan
Mawangmiao	马王庙		Yunyan
West Beijing Road	北京西路		Yunyan
Gaicha Road	改茶路		Yunyan
Qianchun Road	黔春路		Yunyan
West Yan'an Road	延安西路	3	Yunyan
Zilin'an	紫林庵		Yunyan
Penshuichi	喷水池	1	Yunyan
Yangming Ancestral Temple	阳明祠		Yunyan
Provincial People's Hospital	省人民医院		Nanming/Yunyan
South Baoshan Road	宝山南路		Nanming
Youzha Street	油榨街		Nanming
Guigang	贵钢		Nanming
North Fuyuan Road	富源北路		Nanming
Forest Park	森林公园		Nanming
Jianlongdong	见龙洞		Nanming
Longdongbao International Airport	龙洞堡机场	KWE; Longdongbao	Nanming
Xiaobi	小碧		Nanming
Yunpan	云盘		Nanming
Zhongxing Road	中兴路		Nanming
