= Line 1 (Guiyang Metro) =

Metro line in Guiyang, China

- 1
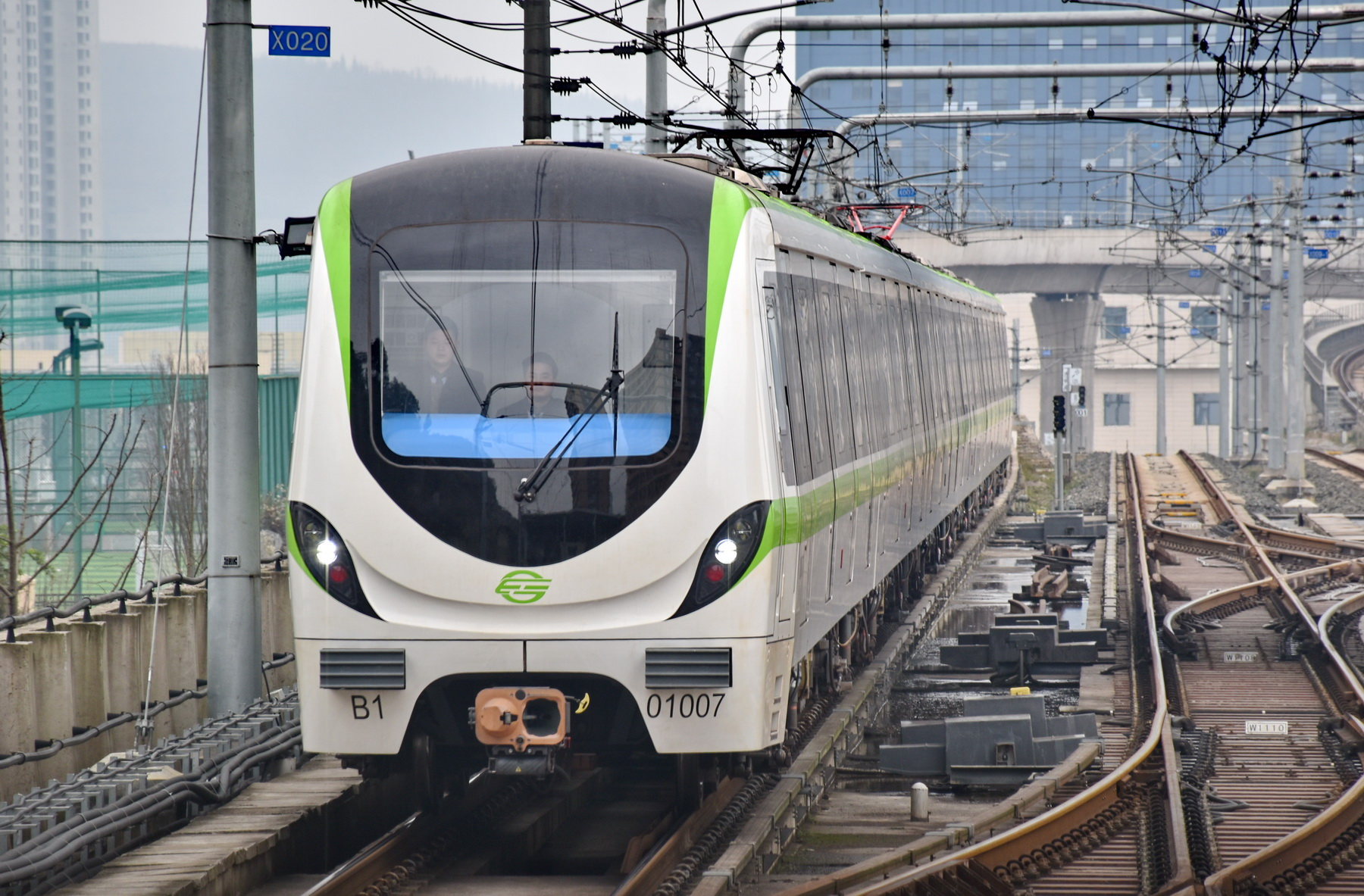

Overview
- Status: Operational
- Locale: Guiyang, Guizhou Province, China
- Termini: Douguan; Xiaomeng Industrial Park
- Stations: 25
- Website: http://www.gyurt.com/

Service
- Type: Rapid transit
- System: Guiyang Metro
- Operator: Guiyang Urban Rail Transit (GYURT)
- Depot: 2

History
- Opened: 28 December 2017; 8 years ago

Technical
- Line length: 35.11 km (21.82 mi)
- Number of tracks: 2
- Character: Underground & Elevated
- Track gauge: 1,435 mm (4 ft 8 1/2 in)
- Electrification: Overhead line
- Operating speed: 80 km/h

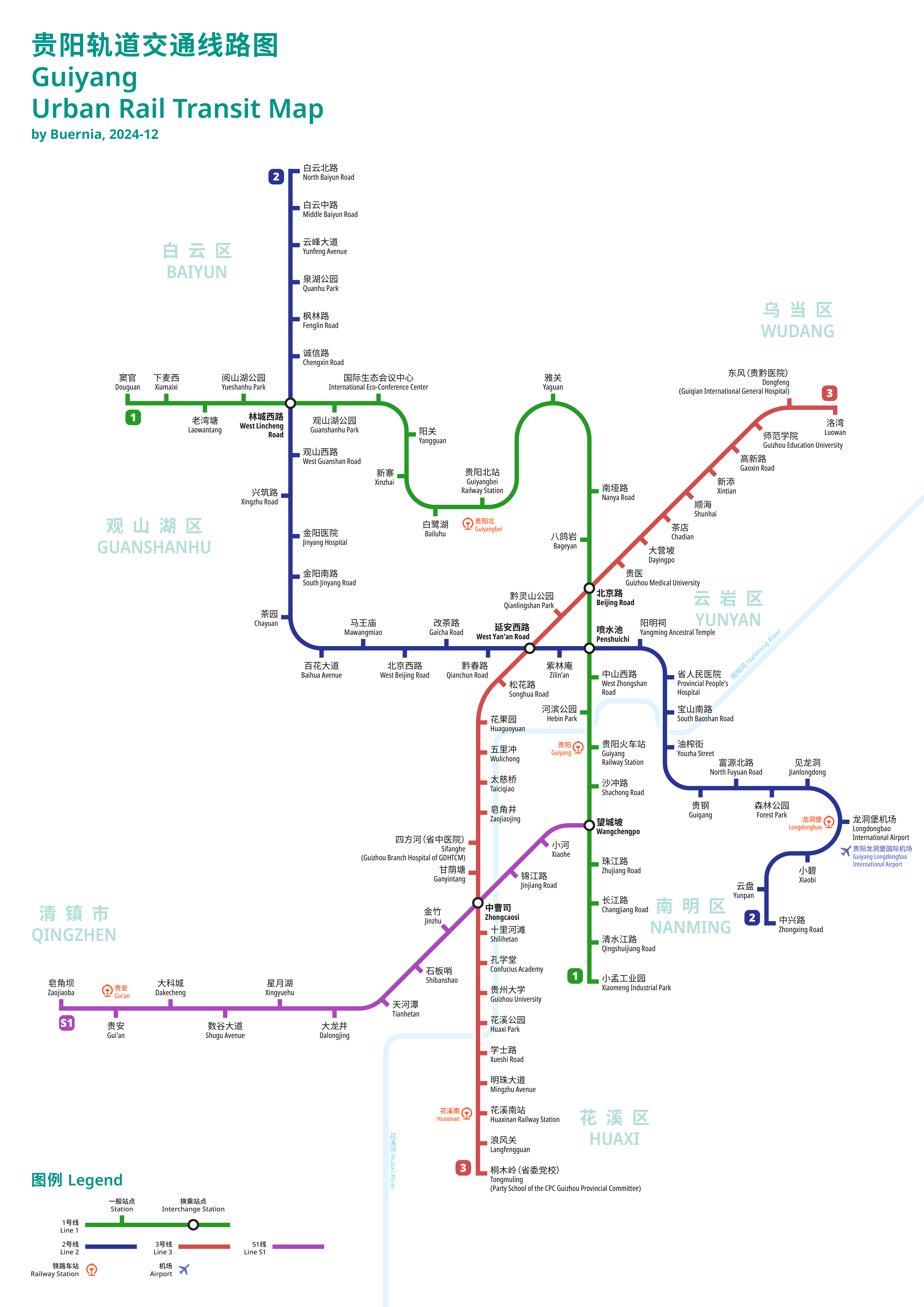
Current plan map of Guiyang Metro

Line 1 of the Guiyang Metro, is a subway line in Guiyang.

The northern section (Guanshanhu section) opened on December 28, 2017. The northern section has 10 stations and is 12.9 kilometres (8.0 mi) long, from Xiamaixi to Guiyangbei Railway Station. The southern section was opened on December 1, 2018. Douguan station opened on December 28, 2019.

== Opening timeline ==
Segment	Commencement	Length	Station(s)	Name
Xiamaixi — Guiyangbei Railway Station	28 December 2017	12.9 km (8.02 mi)	10	Phase 1 (Guanshanhu section)
Guiyangbei Railway Station — Xiaomeng Industrial Park	1 December 2018		14	Phase 1 (Southern section)
Douguan — Xiamaixi	28 December 2019		1	Phase 1 (one-station extension)

== Stations ==
«

Route of Line 1

station name		Connections	Distance km	Location
English	Chinese	Connections	Distance km	Location
Douguan	窦官			Guanshanhu
Xiamaixi	下麦西			Guanshanhu
Laowantang	老湾塘			Guanshanhu
Yueshanhu Park	阅山湖公园			Guanshanhu
West Lincheng Road	林城西路	2		Guanshanhu
Guanshanhu Park	观山湖公园			Guanshanhu
International Eco-Conference Center	国际生态会议中心	T2 (U/C)		Guanshanhu
Yangguan	阳关			Guanshanhu
Xinzhai	新寨			Guanshanhu
Bailuhu	白鹭湖			Guanshanhu
Guiyangbei Railway Station	贵阳北站	GK KQW		Guanshanhu
Yaguan	雅关			Yunyan
Nanya Road	南垭路			Yunyan
Bageyan	八鸽岩			Yunyan
Beijing Road	北京路	3		Yunyan
Penshuichi	喷水池	2		Yunyan
West Zhongshan Road	中山西路			Nanming/Yunyan
Hebin Park	河滨公园			Nanming
Guiyang Railway Station	贵阳火车站	GIW		Nanming
Shachong Road	沙冲路			Nanming
Wangchengpo	望城坡	S1		Nanming
Zhujiang Road	珠江路			Huaxi
Changjiang Road	长江路			Huaxi
Qingshuijiang Road	清水江路			Huaxi
Xiaomeng Industrial Park	小孟工业园			Huaxi
