= Chayuan station =

Chayuan station may refer to

- Chayuan station (Chongqing Rail Transit), a metro station on Line 6 of Chongqing Rail Transit in Chongqing, China, which opened in 2014
- Chayuan station (Guiyang Metro), a metro station on Line 2 of Guiyang Metro in Guiyang, Guizhou, China, which opened in 2021
