= CWTP =

CWTP may refer to:

- John J. Carroll Water Treatment Plant, a water treatment plant for Greater Boston, USA
- China West Technology Park, a science park in Guiyang, China
- Christchurch Wastewater Treatment Plant, a wastewater treatment plant in Christchurch, New Zealand
