= Nanming =

Nanming may refer to:

- Nanming District, in Guiyang, Guizhou, China
- Southern Ming, Ming loyalist regimes that existed in Southern China from 1644 to 1662
