= Qingzhen =

Qingzhen 清镇市
- County-level city
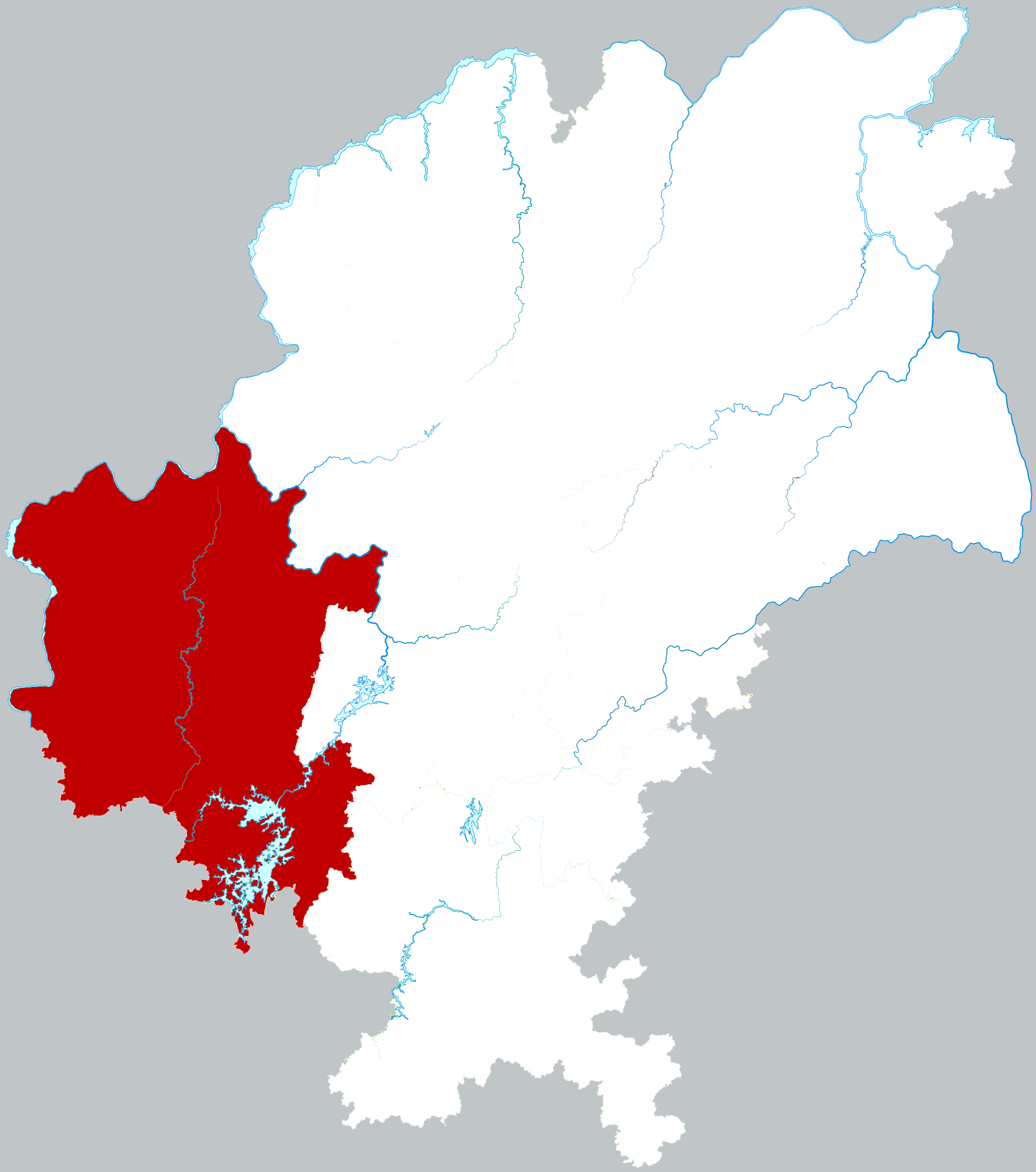
- Qingzhen in Guiyang

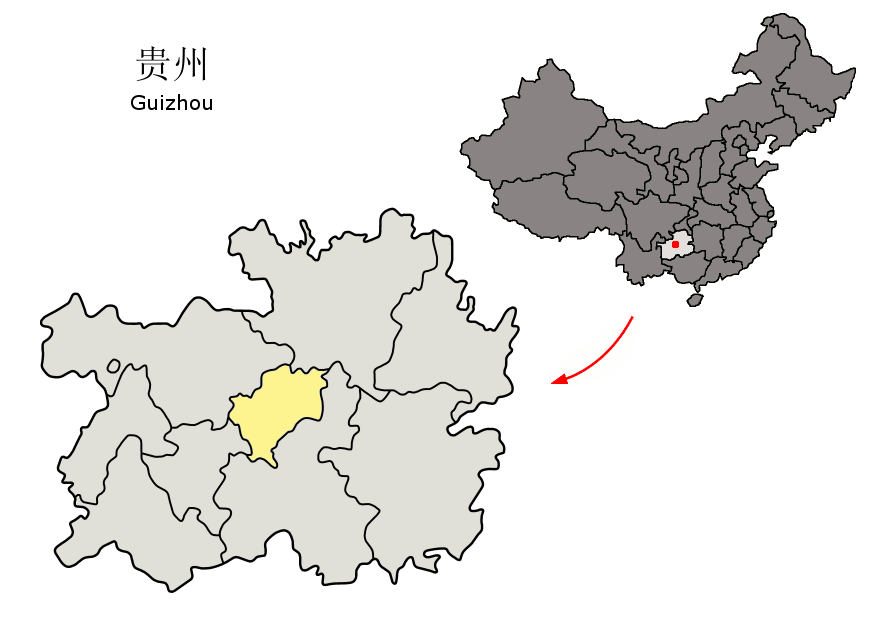
- Guiyang in Guizhou
- Coordinates (Qingzhen municipal government): 26°34′13″N 106°28′07″E
- Country: China
- Province: Guizhou
- Prefecture-level city: Guiyang
- Municipal seat: Qinglongshan

Area
  - Total: 1,381 km^{2} (533 sq mi)

Population (2010)
  - Total: 467,438
  - Density: 338.5/km^{2} (876.7/sq mi)
- Time zone: UTC+8 (China Standard)

The term Qingzhen can also refer to Chinese Muslims, Chinese Islamic cuisine or the Hui ethnic group.

Qingzhen (simplified Chinese: 清镇; traditional Chinese: 清鎮; pinyin: Qīngzhèn) is a county-level city under the administration of Guiyang, the capital of Guizhou Province, China. It is located to the west of Guiyang's urban core, bordering Huaxi District to the southeast, the districts of Guanshanhu and Baiyun to the east and Xiuwen County to the northeast.

== Administrative divisions ==
Qingzhen comprises 3 subdistricts, 6 towns and 3 ethnic townships:

subdistricts

- Qinglongshan Subdistrict 青龙山街道
- Chaofeng Subdistrict 巢凤街道
- Binhu Subdistrict 滨湖街道

towns

- Hongfenghu Town 红枫湖镇
- Zhanjie Town 站街镇
- Weicheng Town 卫城镇
- Xindian Town 新店镇
- Anliu Town 暗流镇
- Liwo Town 犁倭镇

ethnic townships

- Maige Miao and Bouyei Ethnic Township 麦格苗族布依族乡
- Wangzhuang Miao and Bouyei Ethnic Township 王庄布依族苗族乡
- Liuchang Miao Ethnic Township 流长苗族乡

== Climate ==
Climate data for Qingzhen, elevation 1,300 m (4,300 ft), (1991–2020 normals, extremes 1991–present)
Month	Jan	Feb	Mar	Apr	May	Jun	Jul	Aug	Sep	Oct	Nov	Dec	Year
Record high °C (°F)	22.9 (73.2)	28.9 (84.0)	30.8 (87.4)	32.6 (90.7)	34.1 (93.4)	32.4 (90.3)	33.0 (91.4)	34.0 (93.2)	33.0 (91.4)	29.9 (85.8)	25.9 (78.6)	23.2 (73.8)	34.1 (93.4)
Mean daily maximum °C (°F)	7.6 (45.7)	11.1 (52.0)	15.4 (59.7)	20.6 (69.1)	23.5 (74.3)	25.2 (77.4)	27.2 (81.0)	27.5 (81.5)	24.5 (76.1)	19.2 (66.6)	15.4 (59.7)	9.9 (49.8)	18.9 (66.1)
Daily mean °C (°F)	4.2 (39.6)	6.8 (44.2)	10.6 (51.1)	15.5 (59.9)	18.8 (65.8)	21.1 (70.0)	22.8 (73.0)	22.6 (72.7)	19.8 (67.6)	15.4 (59.7)	11.3 (52.3)	6.1 (43.0)	14.6 (58.2)
Mean daily minimum °C (°F)	2.0 (35.6)	4.0 (39.2)	7.6 (45.7)	12.2 (54.0)	15.5 (59.9)	18.3 (64.9)	19.9 (67.8)	19.4 (66.9)	16.6 (61.9)	12.8 (55.0)	8.4 (47.1)	3.6 (38.5)	11.7 (53.0)
Record low °C (°F)	−5.7 (21.7)	−6.0 (21.2)	−1.5 (29.3)	1.2 (34.2)	6.6 (43.9)	11.5 (52.7)	13.4 (56.1)	13.4 (56.1)	7.7 (45.9)	3.3 (37.9)	−2.3 (27.9)	−5.9 (21.4)	−6.0 (21.2)
Average precipitation mm (inches)	28.4 (1.12)	21.9 (0.86)	45.2 (1.78)	83.5 (3.29)	179.4 (7.06)	254.1 (10.00)	215.2 (8.47)	126.0 (4.96)	91.3 (3.59)	94.5 (3.72)	40.2 (1.58)	22.5 (0.89)	1,202.2 (47.32)
Average precipitation days (≥ 0.1 mm)	17.4	13.9	16.6	15.7	17.4	18.2	15.7	14.4	12.1	16.2	12.5	13.9	184
Average snowy days	5.9	3.0	0.6	0	0	0	0	0	0	0	0.3	2.3	12.1
Average relative humidity (%)	85	81	80	79	79	83	82	80	80	83	81	82	81
Mean monthly sunshine hours	38.4	56.4	81.6	110.3	120.6	93.5	150.0	160.7	119.2	77.0	76.9	55.7	1,140.3
Percentage possible sunshine	12	18	22	29	29	23	36	40	33	22	24	17	25
Source: China Meteorological Administration
