= Guiyang Olympic Sports Center =

Sports venue in Guiyang, China

- 贵阳奥林匹克体育中心
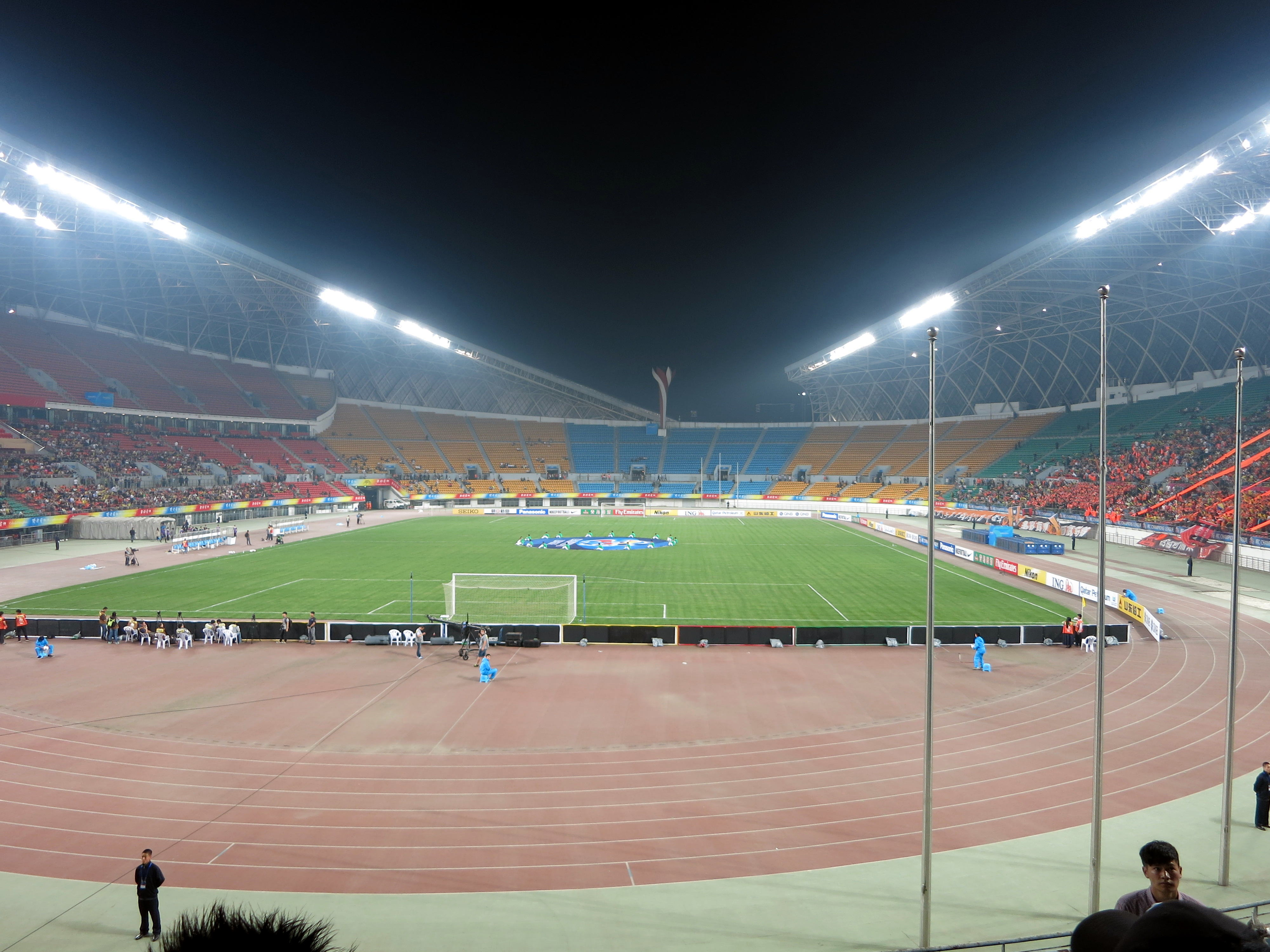

- Location in China
- Location: Guanshanhu District, Guiyang, Guizhou, China
- Coordinates: 26.620721°N 106.605749°E
- Capacity: 51,636 (main stadium)

Construction
- Groundbreaking: 2006
- Opened: 2010
- Cost: 1.9 billion yuan

Tenant
- Guizhou Hengfeng Zhicheng F.C.

The Guiyang Olympic Sports Centre Stadium (Chinese: 贵阳奥林匹克体育中心) is a sports venue in Guanshanhu District, Guiyang, China. With a capacity of 51,636 people, it is the largest sports venue in Guizhou Province.

Construction began in 2006, and the center was opened in 2010, with a total investment of 1.9 billion yuan. It includes a multi-purpose stadium with 51,636 seats, an 8,000-seat indoor stadium, a 3,000-seat natatorium, a 17-court tennis center, as well supporting facilities such as a media center and a training center.

The stadium hosted the Ninth National Minorities Games in 2011. It is the home stadium of Guizhou Hengfeng Zhicheng F.C. of the Chinese Super League.
