= Touqiao Subdistrict =

Touqiao Subdistrict 头桥街道
- Subdistrict
- Location in Guizhou
- Coordinates: 26°35′12″N 106°41′12″E
- Country: People's Republic of China
- Province: Guizhou
- Prefecture-level city: Guiyang
- District: Yunyan District
- Time zone: UTC+8 (China Standard)

Touqiao Subdistrict (simplified Chinese: 头桥街道; traditional Chinese: 頭橋街道; pinyin: Tóuqiáo Jiēdào) is a subdistrict in Yunyan District of Guiyang, Guizhou, China. As of 2020, it administers the following sixteen residential neighborhoods:

- Qianchun (黔春)
- Tou'erqiao (头二桥)
- Haima (海马)
- Yinglie (英烈)
- Huangjin (黄金)
- Shuangfeng (双峰)
- Yanxi (延西)
- Hongfu (宏福)
- Liuwan (柳湾)
- Luohanying (罗汉营)
- Jinding (金鼎)
- Songshan (松山)
- Longcheng (龙城)
- Wuliu (五柳)
- Jingu (金谷)
- Beidi (贝地)

== See also ==
- List of township-level divisions of Guizhou
