= China West Technology Park =

Science park in Guiyang, China

China West Technology Park (CWTP) is a science park in the Jinyang New District of the city of Guiyang, China.

The Jinyang New District is the new central business and technology district of Guiyang. CWTP is notable because it is one of the first science parks in Southwest China and it is expected to provide the Guiyang area with new high skilled and technical jobs.

== Area ==
The China West Technology Park (CWTP) consists of seven Class A multi-use buildings comprising 164,000 m^{2} of office, lab, meeting, residential, hotel, dining and retail space. It is anticipated that over 200 IT and business support companies with between 6,000 and 10,000 workers will be housed in CWTP within three years of its opening. The Park will be home to a number of city and provincial level science and technology bureau designations including the Guizhou Provincial Technology Innovation Center, both the Guiyang and Guizhou Provincial High-Tech Enterprise Incubators, and the Guizhou Provincial IT Outsourcing center. These knowledge centers will provide resident companies access to government and private funding sources as well as preferential business and income tax incentives, and preferential trade policies.

The first phase of construction of the Park will include two 22-story office towers, a dining service annex with international and local restaurants as well as a 500-seat food court, and an 860-car parking garage. The first phase is now completed with occupancy estimated by mid-late 2011. The second and final phase of the park will include two remaining towers: one 22-story office tower, one 24-story residential tower, the 20,850 m^{2} Forest City E-Mall, and second annex building that will house the Park's conference and meeting center as well as child day care and fitness facilities. Phase 2 of the Park will be completed by mid-2012 with occupancy estimated by late-2012.

== Location ==
CWTP is situated at the center of Guiyang's National High-Tech Industrial Development Zone, approximately 1 km south of the Guiyang International Exposition and Convention Center, 1 km east of the Gui-Zun Expressway, 1.6 km from the Guiyang municipal government administration complex, 4 km from the Gui-Huang Expressway, 5 km from the Guiyang Orbital Highway, 7 km from Guiyang's CBD, and 16 km from Guiyang's Longdongbao International Airport.

Via the Gui-Zun Expressway, CWTP is a 3-hour drive to/from Chongqing and a 7-hour drive to/from Chengdu. Chengdu will be a 5 to 6 hour drive via the Guizhou-Sichuan Expressway, which is slated for completion in 2014. Via the Gui-Huang Expressway, the Park is a 5-hour drive to/from Kunming, and via the Guiyang Orbital Highway and Gui-Xing Expressway, the Park is a 25 to 35 minute drive to/from the Guiyang's Longdongbao International Airport. Starting in 2013, the Park will be a 6-hour drive to/from the port city of Guangzhou via the new Gui-Guang Expressway, which will transverse the city of Guilin.

The Guiyang city-wide light rail system will have a major station opening in 2012 within 200 meters of the CWTP campus and a second station on the city's # 4 light rail line will be opening adjacent to CWTP by 2016. Also opening in 2012, Guiyang's Central Hi-Speed Railway Station on Xingqian Road is located 1.6 km from CWTP, and as a major railway hub for southwest China, will offer passenger and freight service with 100 daily CRH bullet trains travelling on 4 national high speed railways to all major cities in China. The CRH trains will travel at average speeds of 300 km/h and make door to door travel times to/from many domestic cities competitive with air-travel.
