= Guanshanhu District =

Guanshanhu 观山湖区
- District
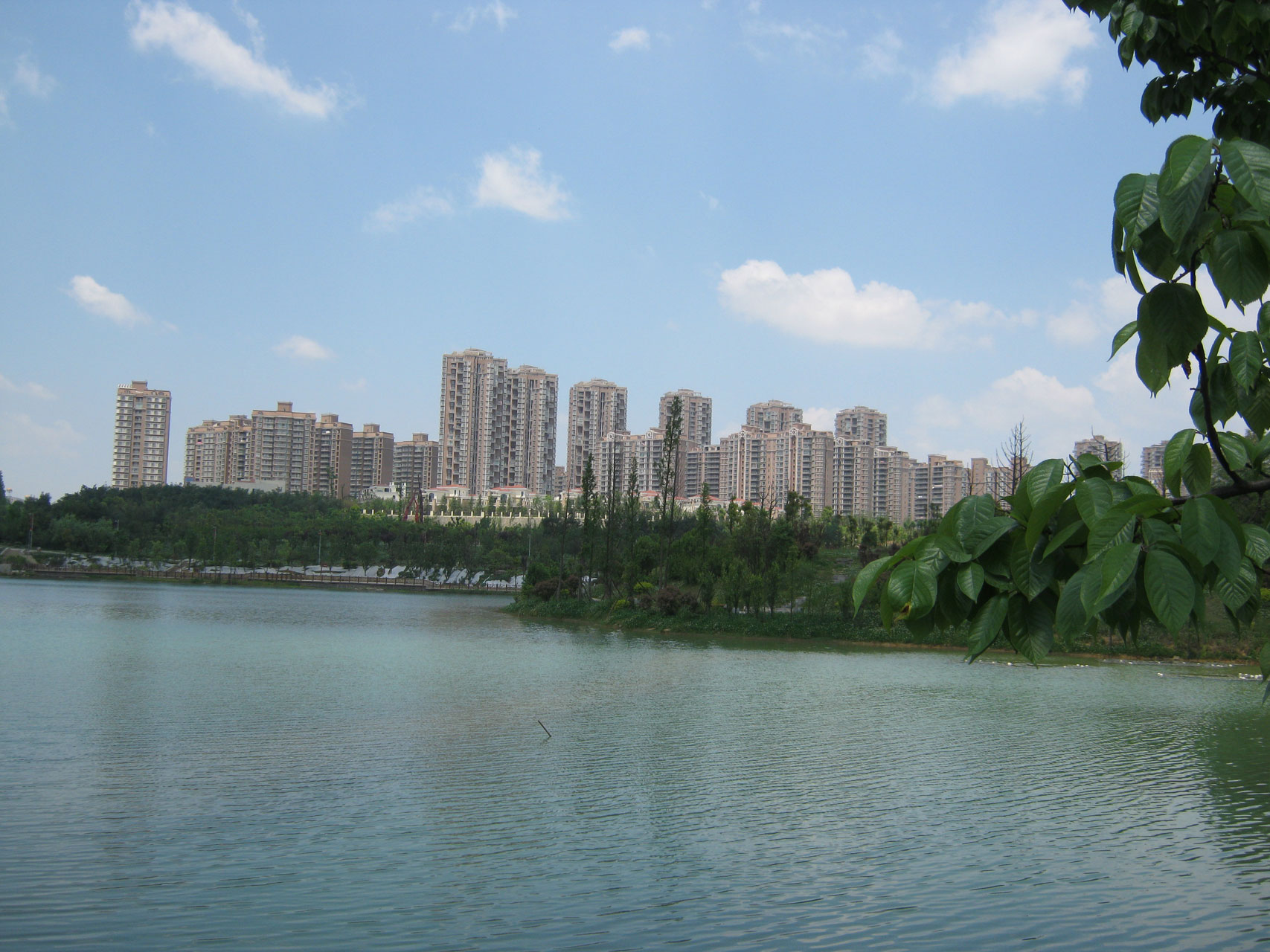
- View from Guanshan Lake Park

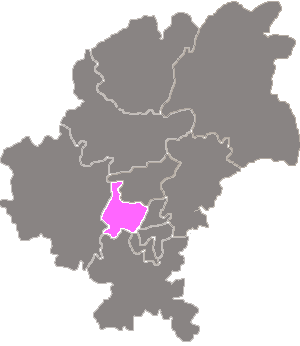
- Guanshanhu in Guiyang

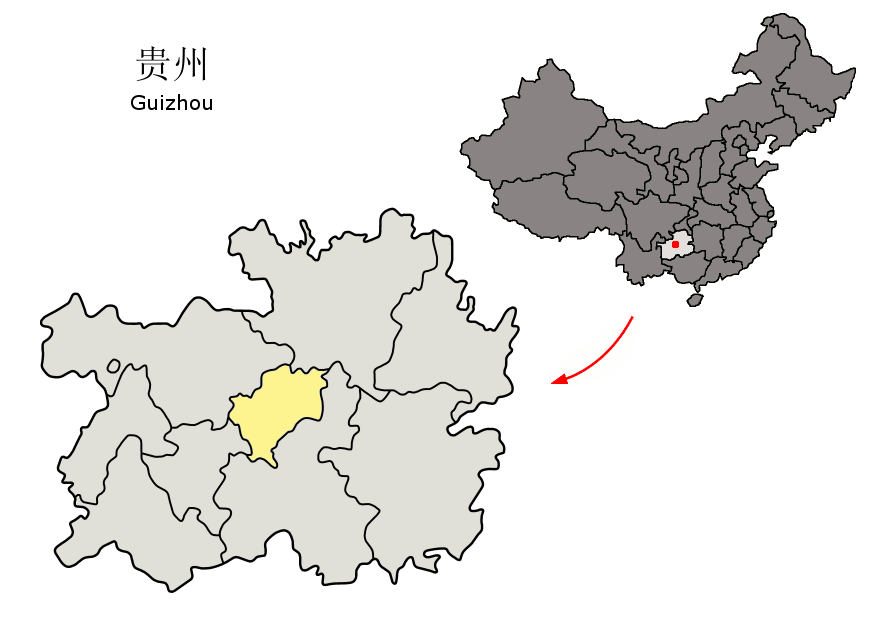
- Guiyang in Guizhou
- Coordinates (Guanshanhu District government): 26°36′59″N 106°35′56″E
- Country: China
- Province: Guizhou
- Prefecture-level city: Guiyang
- Township-level divisions: 7 subdistricts, 3 towns
- Named after: Guanshan Lake
- District seat: Jinyang Subdistrict

Area
  - Total: 309.48 km^{2} (119.49 sq mi)

Population (2020)
  - Total: 642,634
  - Density: 2,076.5/km^{2} (5,378.1/sq mi)
- Time zone: UTC+8 (China Standard)
- Postal code: 550081
- Area code: 0851
- Website: https://web.archive.org/web/20090924084339/http://www.gyjinyang.gov.cn/

Guanshanhu District (simplified Chinese: 观山湖区; traditional Chinese: 觀山湖區; pinyin: Guānshānhú Qū; lit. 'Guanshan Lake District'), formerly the Jinyang New Area (JYND; simplified Chinese: 金阳新区; traditional Chinese: 金陽新區; pinyin: Jīnyáng Xīnqū), is one of 6 urban districts and the municipal seat of the prefecture-level city of Guiyang, the capital of Guizhou Province, in Southwest China. Located to the northwest of Guiyang's city centre, Guanshanhu District is situated beyond the city's mountains on high-plains interspersed with rolling hills, at an average altitude of 1,200 metres (3,900 ft). The district spans an area of 309.48 square kilometres (119.49 mi^{2}), and has a population of 642,634 as of 2020.

As a new city district of Guiyang, the Guanshanhu District is focused on government, finance, real estate, high-tech, transportation, aerospace and commercial services. Since its inception in 2001, through the end of 2008, 43 billion yuan was invested in the Guanshanhu District. Guanshanhu District is home to Guiyang's municipal government offices.

== Toponymy ==
Prior to being established as a district, the area was incorporated as the Jinyang New Area (JYND; simplified Chinese: 金阳新区; traditional Chinese: 金陽新區; pinyin: Jīnyáng Xīnqū). However, in order to avoid confusion with Jinyang County in Sichuan (which is written and pronounced identically), upon the area's re-organization as a district, it was renamed to Guanshanhu District (simplified Chinese: 观山湖区; traditional Chinese: 觀山湖區; pinyin: Guānshānhú Qū; lit. 'Guanshan Lake District'), after a prominent lake in the district.

== History ==
In the early part of 2000, the municipal government of Guiyang devised a plan to build a new urban area to the northwest of the existing core, in response to the increased congestion caused by the city's recent growth. On April 14, the municipal government established a group to organize the development of such an area, then-called the Jinyang New Area (JYND; simplified Chinese: 金阳新区; traditional Chinese: 金陽新區; pinyin: Jīnyáng Xīnqū). The Jinyang New Area was first carved out of areas from Wudang District and Baiyun District, and was transferred additional areas from the two districts in 2006 and 2007.

By the end of 2011, the Jinyang New Area spanned an area of 307 square kilometres (119 mi^{2}), and had a population of about 240,000.

Guanshanhu District was formally established as a district on December 21, 2012. At the time of its establishment, the district spanned an area of 309.48 square kilometres (119.49 mi^{2}), and had a population of 240,700.

== Geography ==
Guanshanhu District spans west to east from 106° 33' to 106° 41', and south to north from 26°33' to 26°40'.

46.01% of the district's area is forested.

=== Climate ===
The district has a humid subtropical climate.

== Administrative divisions ==
Guanshanhu District administers seven subdistricts and three towns. These township-level divisions then, in turn, administer 49 administrative villages and 90 residential communities.

The district's seven subdistricts are Binyang Subdistrict (宾阳街道), Yuntan Subdistrict (云潭街道), Jinhuayuan Subdistrict (金华园街道), Changling Subdistrict (长岭街道), Guanshan Subdistrict (观山街道), Shijicheng Subdistrict (世纪城街道), and Jinyang Subdistrict (金阳街道).

The district's three towns are Jinhua (金华镇), Zhuchang (朱昌镇), and Baihuahu (百花湖镇).

== Demographics ==
Guanshanhu District had a permanent resident population of 642,634 per the 2020 Chinese Census. As of 2020, Guanshanhu District's population accounted for 10.73% of Guiyang's total population.

51.56% of Guanshanhu District's population is male as of 2020, giving it a sex ratio of 106.46 males per 100 females.

19.07% of the district's population is 14 years old or under as of 2020, 70.37% is between the ages of 15 and 59, and the remaining 10.56% is 60 years old or over. 7.07% of the district's population is 65 years and older.

The district has a crude birth rate of 21.09 per thousand, and a crude death rate of 18.73 per thousand, giving it a rate of natural increase of 2.36 per thousand.

Ethnic minorities in Guanshanhu District include the Miao, the Bouyei, and the Tujia.

=== Historical population ===
The area's population has grown dramatically in the 21st century, largely driven by the relocation of major governmental and economic institutions to the district. From 2004 to 2008, the district's population grew from 70,000 to 180,000. By the end of 2011, the district's population was approximately 240,000, and was estimated to be about 240,700 by December 2012. Guanshanhu District's population continued to grow throughout the mid and late 2010s, reaching 642,634 by 2020.

== Economy ==
As of 2020, Guanshanhu District has a gross domestic product (GDP) of 65.352 billion renminbi (RMB), a 6.5% increase from the previous year. Of this, 0.441 billion RMB (0.67% of the total economy) comes from the district's primary sector, 10.255 billion RMB (15.69%) comes from the district's secondary sector, and 54.656 billion RMB (83.63%) comes from the district's tertiary sector.

Guiyang's municipal government is seated in Guanshanhu District, and employs 20,000 people and is adjacent to the sprawling Guanshanhu Park in the district's center.

Century Town, located in the district's south, is the largest planned urban development in the district with 40,000 residences and the Century Town shopping complex with 3 interconnected shopping malls and several office buildings.

Guanshanhu District is also home to China West Technology Park (CWTP), a large hi-tech office park composed of seven class-A multi-use buildings comprising 174,000 square meters (1.8 million sq.ft.) of office, lab, meeting, residential, hotel, dining and retail space. It is anticipated that within 3 years of opening in 2012, between 6,000 and 10,000 workers will be employed in CWTP. Current tenants include the regional head offices of China Mingsheng Bank, Sinopec, and the Guizhou Province Talent City, a provincial-scale job market and training center JV between the Shanghai Municipal Government agency and the Guiyang High-Tech Development Zone administration. CWTP initial occupancy began in late 2012.

In 2011, Guizhou Provincial General Hospital announced the location of a provincial medical center campus in the Guanshanhu District, north of the City's government administrative complex. The new medical campus is anticipated for completion in 2015-2016 and will be a large-scale medical and research center employing over 10,000 physician and staff.

Guanshanhu District is home to the regional headquarters of several large companies including China Mobile, China Southern Coal, China Datang Corporation, China Hydro Engineering, and Kweichow Moutai.

=== Minerals ===
Mineral deposits within Guanshanhu District include coal, limestone, silicon, and barite.

== Transportation ==
=== Road ===
The Guanshanhu District has a road network with a of signalized multi-lane roadways which provide access to the Guiyang–Zunyi Expressway, the Guiyang Outer Ring Road and Second Ring Road highways. The Gui-Zun Expressway, the Guiyang Outer Ring Road and Guiyang Second Ring Road highways pass through the district and are part of the national trunk highway system. These divided multi-lane motorways provide the district with rapid vehicular access to the city center, Guiyang Longdongbao International Airport, and all points within Guizhou including the cities of Zunyi, Anshun, and Kaili, as well as the large regional cities of Chongqing, Chengdu, Kunming, Guilin, Changsha, Nanning, and Guangzhou.

The G75 Lanzhou–Haikou Expressway, the G60 Shanghai–Kunming Expressway, and the G76 Xiamen–Chengdu Expressway run through the district.

Guanshanhu District is home to the Jinyang Regional Bus Terminal, the largest coach and bus terminal in Guizhou Province, servicing over 7 million passengers annually.

=== Rail ===
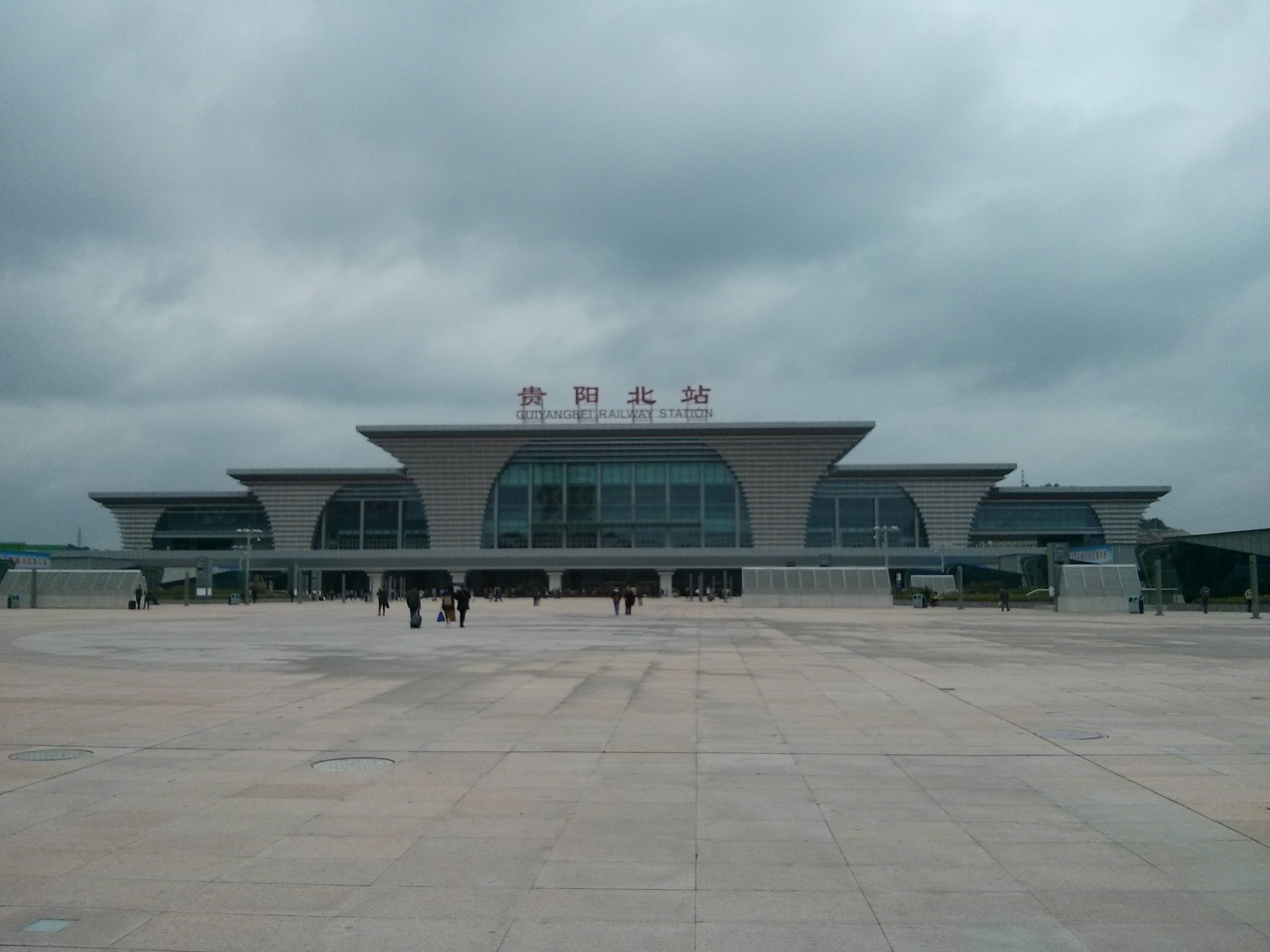
Exterior of the Guiyang North railway station

Major railways that run through Guanshanhu District include the Guiyang–Guangzhou high-speed railway, the Shanghai–Kunming high-speed railway, the Chengdu–Guiyang high-speed railway, and the Chongqing–Guiyang high-speed railway all run through the district. The Guiyang–Nanning high-speed railway will also service the district upon completion.

The district is home to the Guiyang North railway station, which is connected to the country's high-speed rail network. Situated in the eastern area of the Guanshanhu District, the station opened in December 2014. The station is serviced by passenger and freight service on CRH bullet trains that travel at average speed of 300 kilometres per hour (190 mph). These bullet trains travel from Guiyang to Chongqing in 1.5 hours, Chengdu in 3 hours, Guangzhou in 3 hours, Shanghai in 8 hours, and Beijing in 9 hours. Other cities connected by rail include Changsha and Wuhan. About 100 CRH bullet trains service the station daily.

Both lines of the Guiyang Metro run through Guanshanhu District, with 11 stations along Line 1 from Douguan station through to Guiyangbei railway station servicing the district.

Guiyang is currently building a three-line urban light rails system with the city's fline-1 of the system anticipated to be operational in 2015, connecting the Guanshanhu District to the older, established Guiyang central business district, several established high-density inner-city residential neighborhoods, and the airport.

== Culture ==
=== Parks ===
Parks within Guanshanhu District include Guanshanhu Park (Chinese: 观山湖公园), Guiyang Karst Park (Chinese: 贵阳喀斯特公园), Baihua Lake (Chinese: 百花湖; lit. 'Hundred Flowers Lake'), Baihua Lake Forest Park (Chinese: 百花湖森林公园), Xiaowanhe Wetlands Park (Chinese: 小湾河湿地公园), Yueshan Lake Wetlands Park (Chinese: 阅山湖湿地公园), and Donglin Park (Chinese: 东林公园).

=== Sports ===
The Guiyang Olympic Sports Center in Guanshanhu District opened in 2011 and was host to the 9th Chinese Traditional Games for Ethnic Nationalities. The Olympic Center includes a 52,000 seat stadium, a swimming and diving hall, and 17 tennis courts. The total area is 289,000 square meters. The Center also used to host the Guizhou Renhe Football Club of the Chinese Super League prior to their relocation to Beijing.

=== Tourism ===
Guiyang International Exhibition and Convention Center opened in 2011, with 2 million square meters of space, and can host conventions with as many as 20,000 visitors. The Convention and Exhibition Center annually hosts the Global Eco-Forum Guiyang jointly sponsored by the Chinese Government and the United Nations. The Conference center also is adjacent to the new 366-room Hyatt Regency Guiyang, several smaller domestic hotels, and the Zhongtian Super Mall, a 330,000 square meter (3.5 million square feet) multi-level shopping center scheduled to open in 2014. The Marriott International Corporation opened the 340-room Renaissance Guiyang Hotel in February 2012. The hotel adjoins Guanshanhu Park and is also adjacent to the Municipal Government Administration Complex. Other major hotels in the district include the 306-room New World Hotel Guiyang, and the 351-room Empark Grand Hotel Guiyang.

== See also ==
- China West Technology Park
