= Guiyang North railway station =

Railway station in Guiyang, China

Guiyangbei 贵阳北站
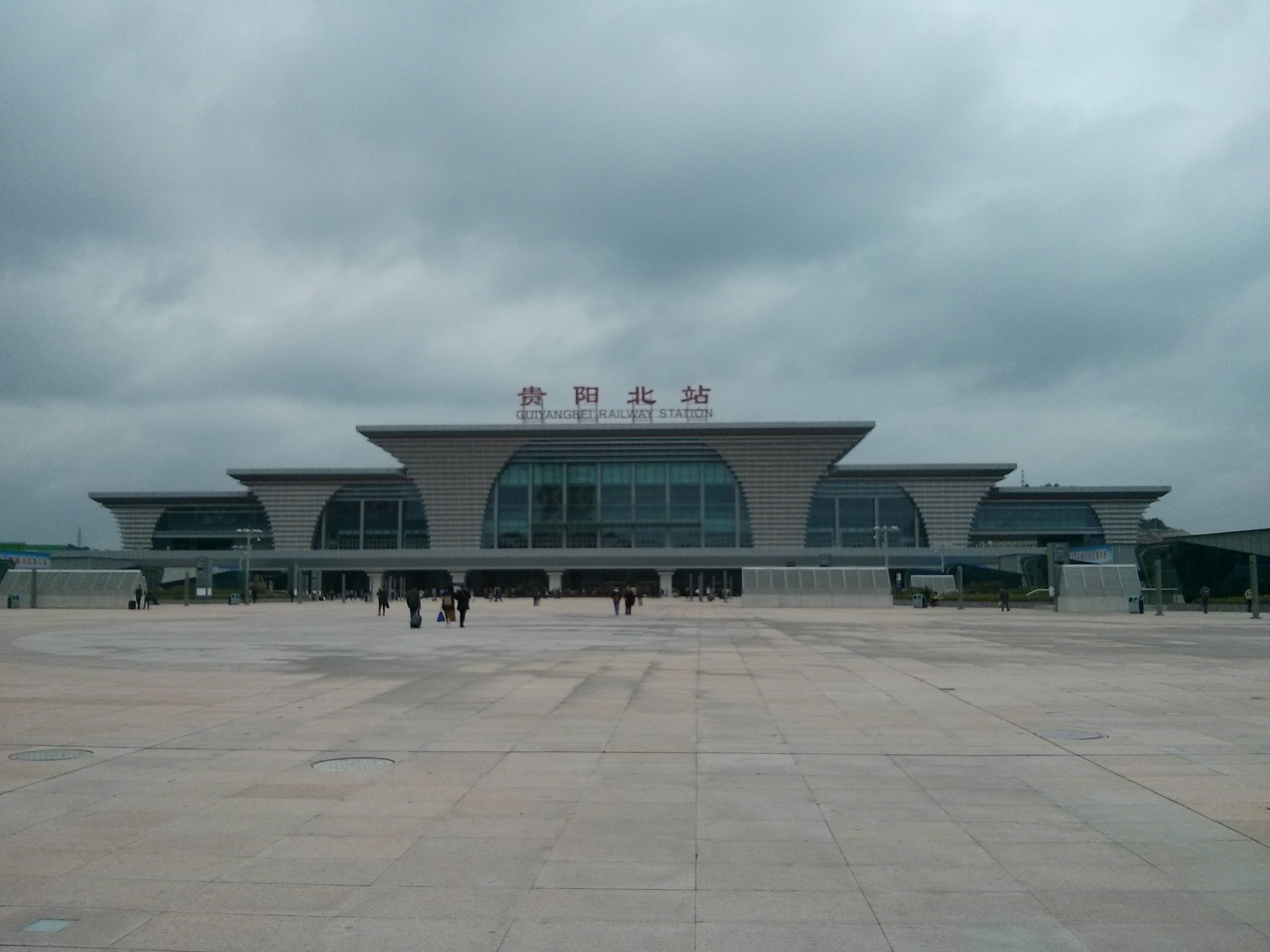
- Station building

General information
- Location: Jiaxiu North Road, Guanshanhu District, Guiyang, Guizhou Province
- Coordinates: 26°37′21″N 106°40′21″E
- System: High speed rail
- Line: Shanghai-Kunming high-speed railway Guiyang-Kaiyang intercity railway Guiyang-Guangzhou high-speed railway
- Platforms: 25
- Tracks: 50

Other information
- Station code: TMIS code: 47483; Telegraph code: KQW; Pinyin code: GYB
- Classification: 1st class station
Location

Guiyang North station (贵阳北站) is one of the three major railway stations in Guiyang, the capital of Guizhou province. It is the largest high-speed railway station in Guizhou and the largest railway transportation hub in southwestern China. It opened on December 26, 2014.

The station is served by many routes, including the Shanghai–Kunming high-speed railway, the Guiyang–Guangzhou high-speed railway, and the Chongqing–Guiyang high-speed railway. It is also served by Guiyang–Kaiyang intercity railway and the Chengdu–Guiyang high-speed railway.

Line 1 of the Guiyang Metro has served Guiyang North station since December 28, 2017.

== See also ==
- Guiyang East railway station

Preceding station	China Railway High-speed	Following station
Guiyang East towards Shanghai Hongqiao	Shanghai–Kunming high-speed railway	Pingba South towards Kunming South
