= Chengdu–Guiyang high-speed railway =

Railway in China

Chengdu-Guiyang high-speed railway 成贵高速铁路

Overview
- Locale: Sichuan, Guizhou and Yunnan, China
- Termini: Chengdu East; Guiyang East

Service
- Services: 1
- Operator(s): China Railway Chengdu Group

History
- Opened: 2014/2019

Technical
- Line length: 648 km (403 mi)
- Track gauge: 1,435 mm (4 ft 8 1/2 in)
- Operating speed: 250 km/h

Chengdu-Guiyang high-speed railway is a major trunk high-speed railway between the provincial capitals of Chengdu, Sichuan and Guiyang, Guizhou via a small section traversing north east Yunnan province. It was selected for construction under the 11th Five Year Plan set by the Chinese Government. Construction started in 2010 and was expected to be completed by 2014. The northern section of this line between Chengdu and Leshan forms the southern part of the operational Chengdu–Mianyang–Leshan intercity railway.

The 135 km (84 mi) Chengdu – Leshan section opened in 2014, the 141 km (88 mi) Leshan – Yibin opened in June 2019, while last 372 km (231 mi) Yibin - Guiyang section opened in December 2019. Almost 82% of the route is on 468 bridges or in 183 tunnels.

== Route ==
The 648 km (403 mi) route commences at Chengdu East, the line proceed south to Leshan and Yibin with in Sichuan before crossing the border into north east Yunnan at Zhaotong, Yiliang County, Zhenxiong County. Once into Guizhou, it travels through Bijie before arriving at Guiyang East. There is a 31 km (19 mi) branch from this route at Leshan to serve the large tourist demands at Emei Shan.
