= Yunyan District =

Yunyan 云岩区
- District
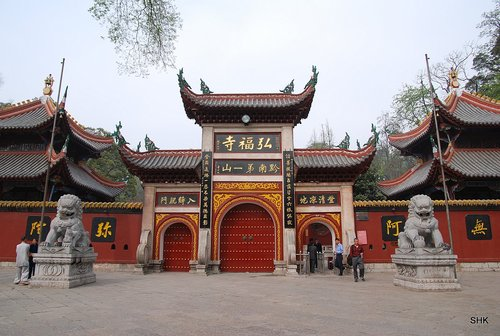

- Location of the seat in Guizhou Yunyan (Southwest China)
- Coordinates (Yunyan District government): 26°36′17″N 106°43′28″E
- Country: China
- Province: Guizhou
- Prefecture-level city: Guiyang

Area
  - Total: 94 km^{2} (36 sq mi)

Population (2010)
  - Total: 957,535
  - Density: 10,187/km^{2} (26,380/sq mi)
- Time zone: UTC+8 (China Standard)

Yunyan District (simplified Chinese: 云岩区; traditional Chinese: 雲岩區; pinyin: Yúnyán Qū) is one of 6 urban districts of the prefecture-level city of Guiyang, the capital of Guizhou Province, China. Yunyan has been the provincial seat of Guizhou since it was established as a province during the Ming dynasty. Yunyan has a majority Han population, and is home to other ethnic groups such as Miao, Bouyei, Hui, and Shui.

== History ==
Yunyan belonged to the Shunyuan Military Monitoring Department during the Yuan dynasty, and later the Guizhou Military Monitoring Department during the Ming dynasty. Since Guizhou's establishment as a province during the Ming dynasty, Yunyan has been the seat of the province. In August 1955, Guiyang's first district was renamed to Yunyan District, and its second district was renamed Fushui District. In 1958, Fushui was merged into Yunyan.

== Administrative divisions ==
Yunyan District comprises 17 subdistricts and 1 town:

subdistricts

- Dayinglu Subdistrict 大营路街道
- Qianlingdonglu Subdistrict 黔灵东路街道
- Wenchangge Subdistrict 文昌阁街道
- Yanwujie Subdistrict 盐务街街道
- Putuolu Subdistrict 普陀路街道
- Bageyan Subdistrict 八鸽岩街道
- Yuxiulu Subdistrict 毓秀路街道
- Weiqingmen Subdistrict 威清门街道
- Shixihe Subdistrict 市西河街道
- Touqiao Subdistrict 头桥街道
- Sanqiaolu Subdistrict 三桥路街道
- Mawang Subdistrict 马王街道
- Jinguan Subdistrict 金关街道
- Chayuanlu Subdistrict 茶园路街道
- Yanghui Subdistrict 杨惠街道
- Yu'an Subdistrict 渔安街道
- Shuidonglu Subdistrict 水东路街道

town

- Qianling Town 黔灵镇
