= Guiyang East railway station =

Railway station in Guiyang, Guizhou Province, China

Guiyangdong 贵阳东
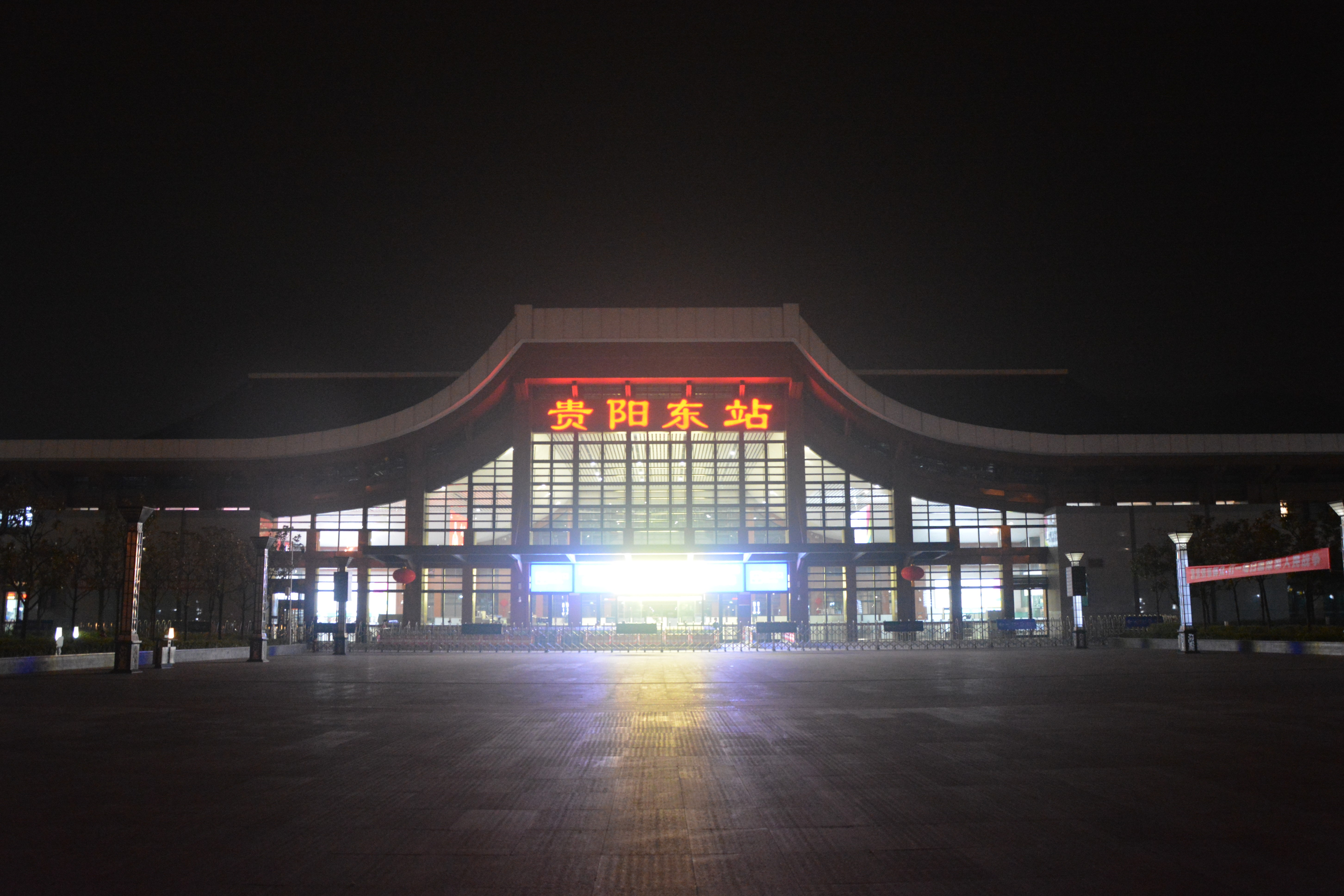

General information
- Location: Wudang District, Guiyang, Guizhou Province; China
- Coordinates: 26°33′35″N 106°41′54″E
- System: High-speed rail
- Lines: Guiyang–Guangzhou high-speed railway Changsha–Kunming high-speed railway Guiyang–Kaiyang intercity railway

Other information
- Station code: TMIS: 47485; Telegraph code: KEW; Pinyin code: GYD
- Classification: 1st class station

History
- Opened: 2 November 2017
Location

Guiyang East railway station is a railway station on the Shanghai–Kunming high-speed railway, the Guiyang–Guangzhou high-speed railway and the Chongqing–Guiyang high-speed railway located in Wudang District, Guiyang, in the Guizhou province, China. This station opened on 2 November 2017.

== Metro station ==
The railway station will be served by Line S2 of Guiyang Metro, which is under planning.

== See also ==
- Guiyang North railway station

Preceding station	China Railway High-speed	Following station
Guiding North towards Shanghai Hongqiao	Shanghai–Kunming high-speed railway	Guiyang North towards Kunming South
