= Huaxi District =

Huaxi 花溪区
- District
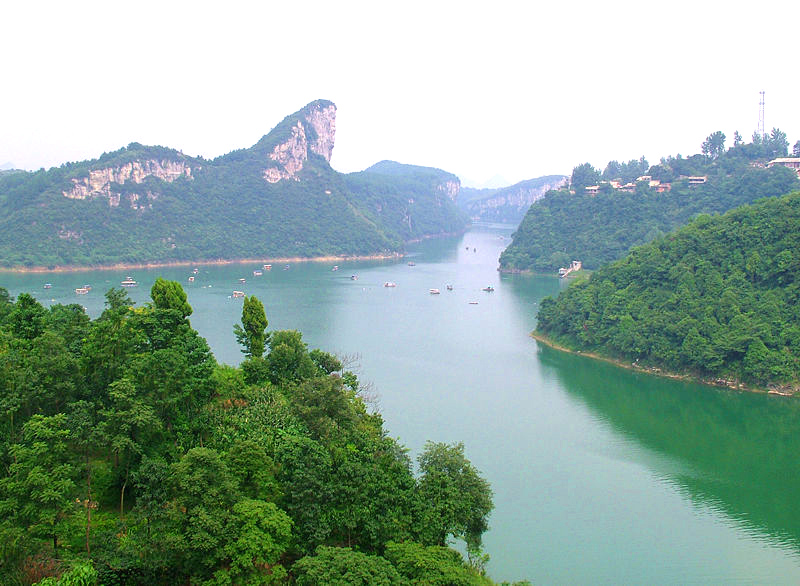
- A far view of Banbianshan (半边山) - Half-Axed Mount

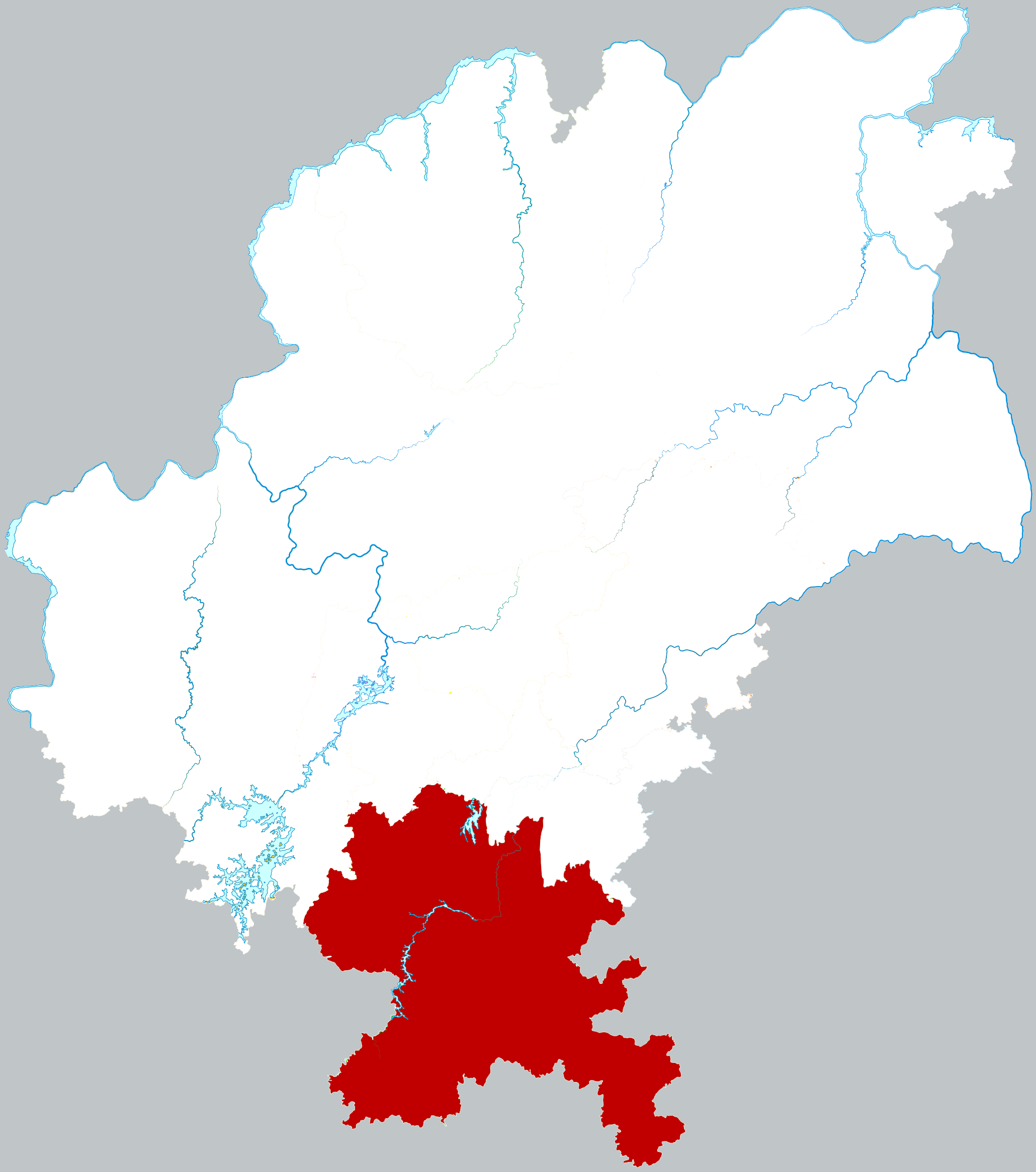
- Huaxi in Guiyang

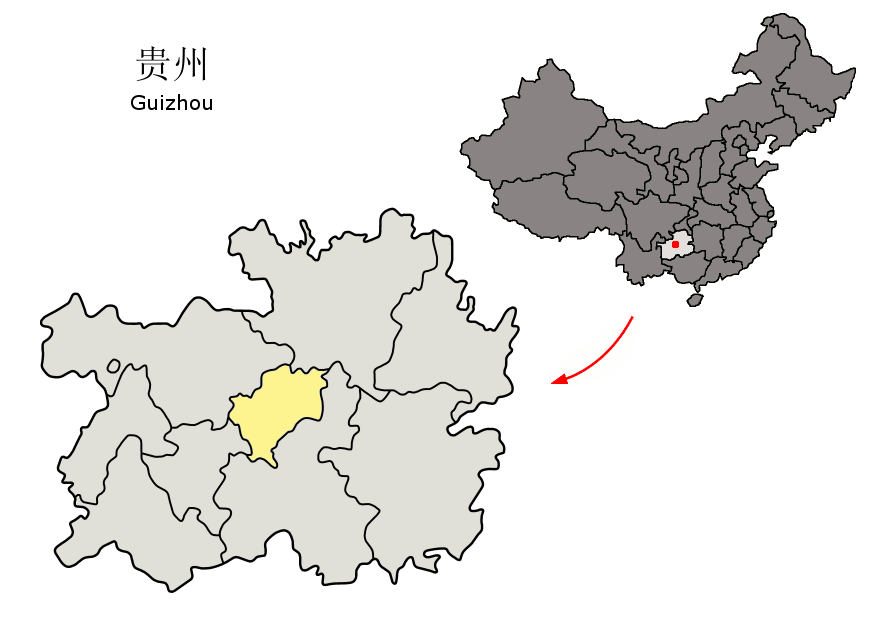
- Guiyang in Guizhou
- Coordinates (Huaxi District government): 26°24′35″N 106°40′13″E
- Country: China
- Province: Guizhou
- Prefecture-level city: Guiyang

Area
  - Total: 957.6 km^{2} (369.7 sq mi)

Population (2010)
  - Total: 608,213
  - Density: 635.1/km^{2} (1,645/sq mi)
- Time zone: UTC+8 (China Standard)
- Division code: HXI
- Website: http://www.hxgov.gov.cn/

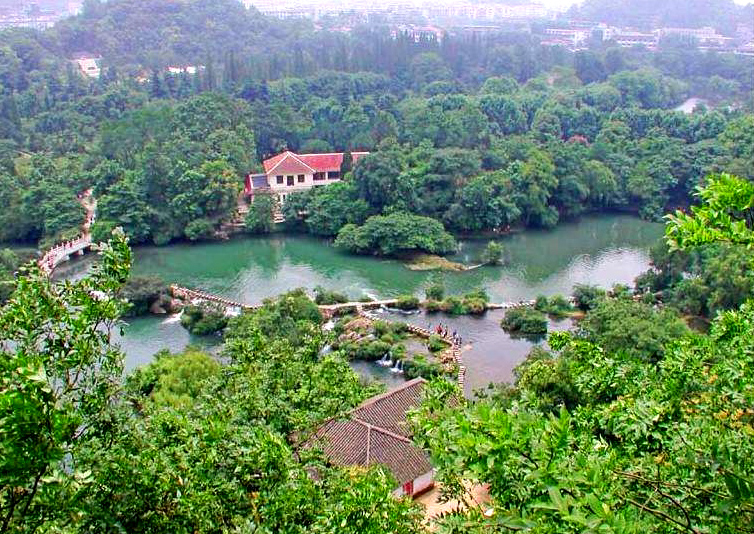
Xishe (西舍), where celebrities make residence in Guiyang

Huaxi District (Chinese: 花溪区; pinyin: Huāxī Qū) is one of 6 urban districts of the prefecture-level city of Guiyang, the capital of Guizhou Province, Southwest China. It has a resort and a national minority cultural center.

Huaxi has an area of 957.6 km^{2} (369.7 sq mi) and a population of 328,700. Its GDP was 4.35 billion RMB in 2006.

It is named after the Huaxi River (the "Flower Brook") that meanders through the town. The North Campus and South Campus of Guizhou University and Guizhou University for Nationalities are located in town. The educational facilities and natural environment make it a renowned educational and cultural center as well as an important tourist destination of Guizhou and southwest China.

== Administrative divisions ==
Huaxi District comprises 8 subdistricts, 5 towns, 1 township and 5 ethnic townships:

subdistricts

- Guizhu Subdistrict 贵筑街道
- Yangguang Subdistrict 阳光街道
- Qingxi Subdistrict 清溪街道
- Xibei Subdistrict 溪北街道
- Huanghelu Subdistrict 黄河路街道
- Pingqiao Subdistrict 平桥街道
- Xiaomeng Subdistrict 小孟街道
- Jinzhu Subdistrict 金筑街道

towns

- Qingyan Town 青岩镇
- Shiban Town 石板镇
- Dangwu Town 党武镇
- Maiping Town 麦坪镇
- Yanlou Town 燕楼镇

township

- Jiu'an Township 久安乡

ethnic townships

- Mengguan Miao and Bouyei Ethnic Township 孟关苗族布依族乡
- Huchao Miao and Bouyei Ethnic Township 湖潮苗族布依族乡
- Gaopo Miao Ethnic Township 高坡苗族乡
- Qiantao Bouyei and Miao Ethnic Township 黔陶布依族苗族乡
- Maling Bouyei and Miao Ethnic Township 马铃布依族苗族乡

== Climate ==
Climate data for Huaxi, elevation 1,149 m (3,770 ft), (1991–2020 normals, extremes 1981–present)
Month	Jan	Feb	Mar	Apr	May	Jun	Jul	Aug	Sep	Oct	Nov	Dec	Year
Record high °C (°F)	21.8 (71.2)	28.5 (83.3)	32.0 (89.6)	33.5 (92.3)	33.2 (91.8)	32.2 (90.0)	33.5 (92.3)	33.4 (92.1)	33.6 (92.5)	29.7 (85.5)	25.8 (78.4)	23.4 (74.1)	33.6 (92.5)
Mean daily maximum °C (°F)	8.4 (47.1)	11.9 (53.4)	16.3 (61.3)	21.5 (70.7)	24.2 (75.6)	26.0 (78.8)	27.7 (81.9)	28.1 (82.6)	25.3 (77.5)	20.3 (68.5)	16.3 (61.3)	10.8 (51.4)	19.7 (67.5)
Daily mean °C (°F)	4.9 (40.8)	7.5 (45.5)	11.3 (52.3)	16.3 (61.3)	19.5 (67.1)	21.9 (71.4)	23.4 (74.1)	23.1 (73.6)	20.4 (68.7)	16.1 (61.0)	11.9 (53.4)	6.8 (44.2)	15.3 (59.5)
Mean daily minimum °C (°F)	2.6 (36.7)	4.7 (40.5)	8.2 (46.8)	12.8 (55.0)	16.1 (61.0)	19.0 (66.2)	20.4 (68.7)	19.8 (67.6)	17.0 (62.6)	13.4 (56.1)	8.9 (48.0)	4.2 (39.6)	12.3 (54.1)
Record low °C (°F)	−5.6 (21.9)	−4.9 (23.2)	−3.8 (25.2)	2.5 (36.5)	7.0 (44.6)	11.7 (53.1)	10.7 (51.3)	13.6 (56.5)	6.8 (44.2)	2.3 (36.1)	−2.8 (27.0)	−9.7 (14.5)	−9.7 (14.5)
Average precipitation mm (inches)	27.9 (1.10)	22.8 (0.90)	45.1 (1.78)	78.9 (3.11)	164.0 (6.46)	243.3 (9.58)	201.1 (7.92)	127.2 (5.01)	99.7 (3.93)	92.5 (3.64)	42.1 (1.66)	21.0 (0.83)	1,165.6 (45.92)
Average precipitation days (≥ 0.1 mm)	16.1	13.3	15.4	15.4	17.2	18.0	16.6	14.4	11.3	15.0	11.4	12.8	176.9
Average snowy days	4.1	2.0	0.3	0	0	0	0	0	0	0	0	1.2	7.6
Average relative humidity (%)	83	80	79	78	79	84	83	82	81	83	81	80	81
Mean monthly sunshine hours	36.4	56.9	79.4	107.7	116.6	94.5	149.1	161.2	123.6	80.3	79.9	55.6	1,141.2
Percentage possible sunshine	11	18	21	28	28	23	36	40	34	23	25	17	25
Source: China Meteorological Administration
