= Nanming District =

Nanming 南明区
- District
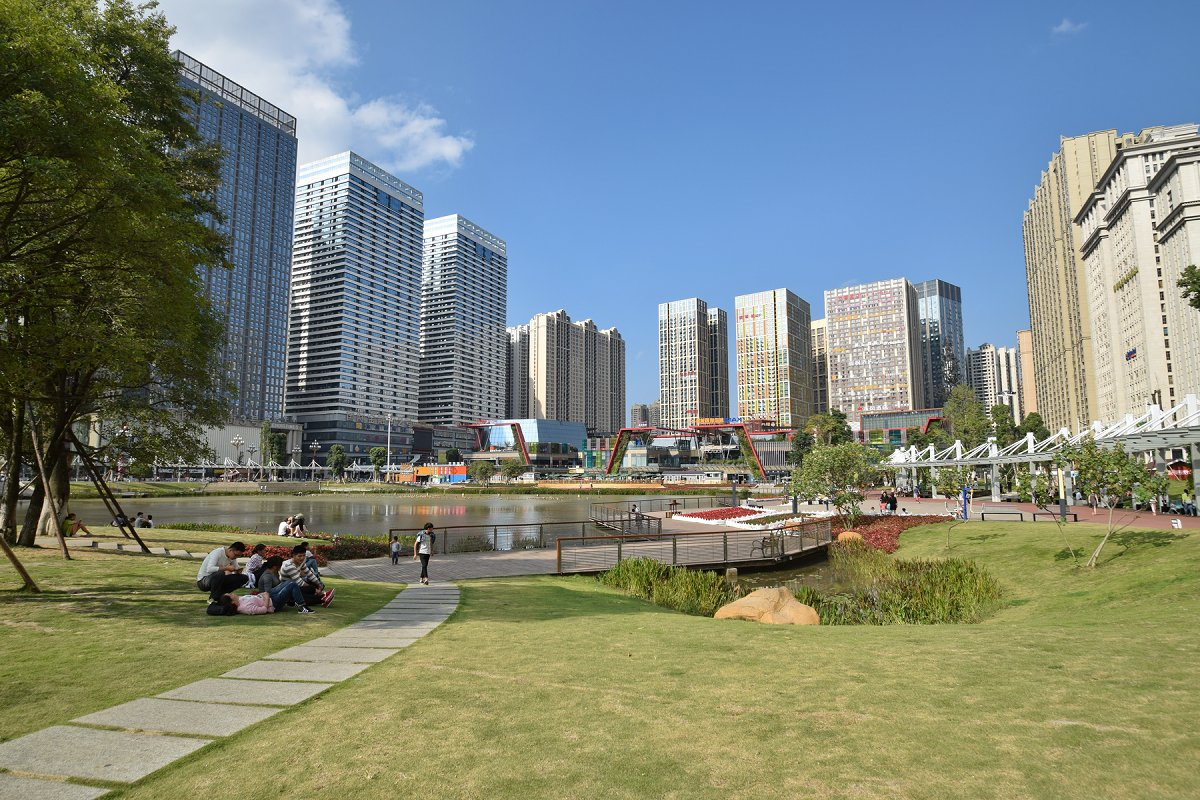
- Huaguoyuan Central Commercial District (花果园中央商务区)

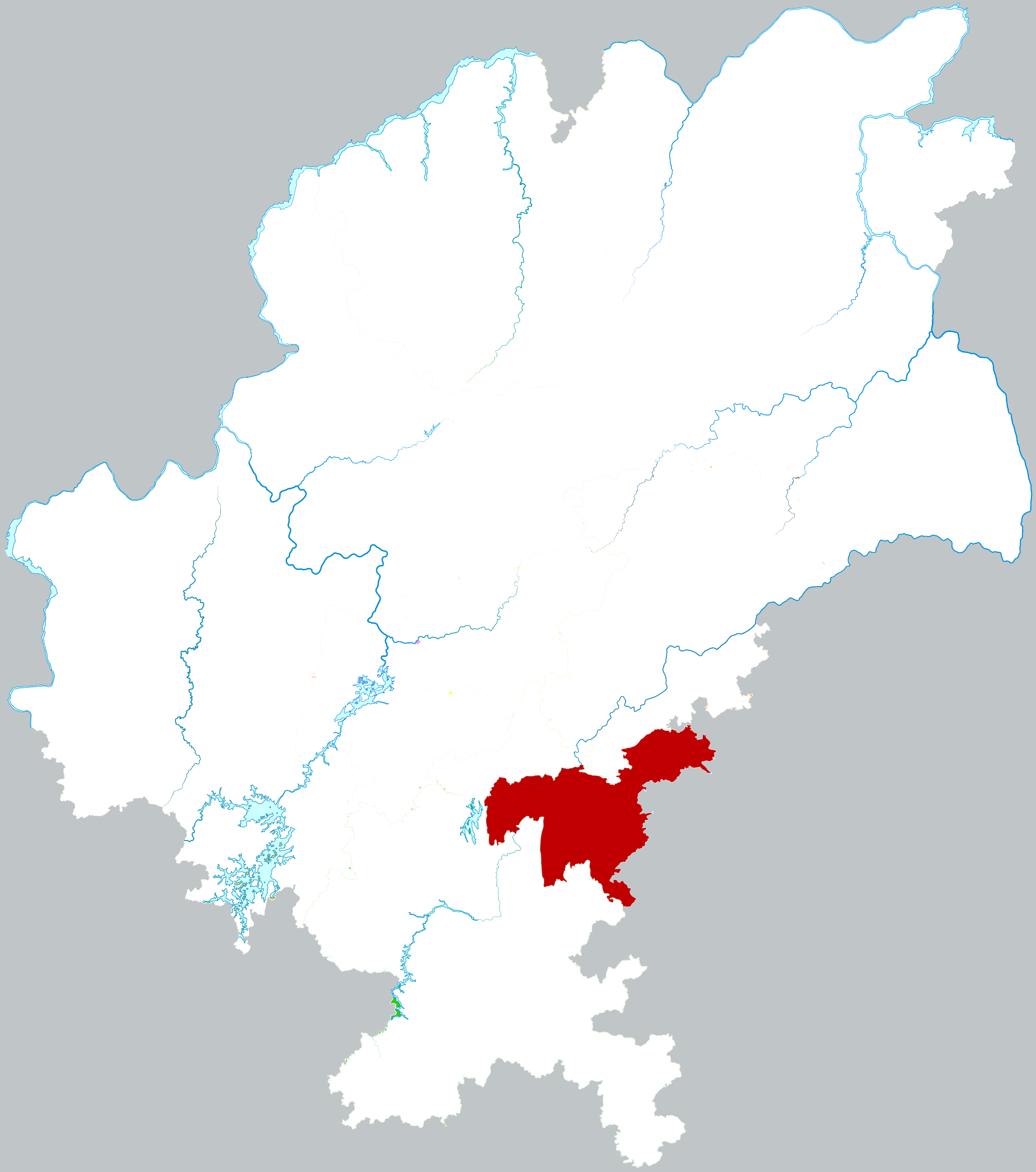
- Nanming in Guiyang

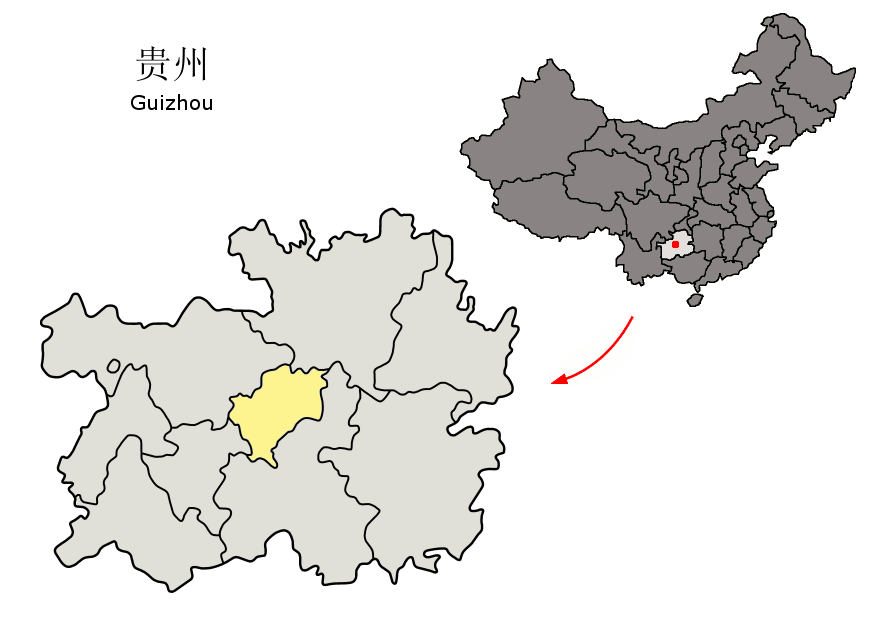
- Guiyang in Guizhou
- Coordinates (Nanming District government): 26°34′05″N 106°42′51″E
- Country: China
- Province: Guizhou
- Prefecture-level city: Guiyang

Area
  - Total: 209 km^{2} (81 sq mi)

Population (2010)
  - Total: 829,948
  - Density: 3,970/km^{2} (10,300/sq mi)
- Time zone: UTC+8 (China Standard)
- Postal code: 550000
- Area code: (0)851
- Website: Official website

Nanming District (Chinese: 南明区) is one of 6 urban districts of the prefecture-level city of Guiyang, the capital of Guizhou Province, Southwest China. Nanming District serves as an economic powerhouse for the city, bringing in GDP of over 30.17 Billion Yuan as of 2011. As of 2004, the district is the second highest ranked economic zone in Guizhou Province according to China's National Bureau of Statistics. It is home to the Guiyang Longdongbao International Airport.

== Administrative Divisions ==
The zoning code for Nanming District is 520102, with its district seat located on Jiàn Street. Nanming District has 18 subdistricts, 3 townships, and 1 ethnic township under its jurisdiction:

subdistricts

- Xinhualu Subdistrict 新华路街道
- Xihulu Subdistrict 西湖路街道
- Shuikousi Subdistrict 水口寺街道
- Zhonghuananlu Subdistrict 中华南路街道
- Hebin Subdistrict 河滨街道
- Zunyilu Subdistrict 遵义路街道
- Xingguanlu Subdistrict 兴关路街道
- Shachonglu Subdistrict 沙冲路街道
- Wangcheng Subdistrict 望城街道
- Taiciqiao Subdistrict 太慈桥街道
- Xiangya Subdistrict 湘雅街道
- Youzha Subdistrict 油榨街道
- Zhongcaosi Subdistrict 中曹司街道
- Erge Subdistrict 二戈街道
- Longdongbao Subdistrict 龙洞堡街道
- Huaguoyuan Subdistrict 花果园街道
- Xiaochehe Subdistrict 小车河街道
- Wulichong Subdistrict 五里冲街道

townships

- Houchao Township 后巢乡
- Yunguan Township 云关乡
- Yongle Township 永乐乡

ethnic township

- Xiaobi Bouyei and Miao Ethnic Township 小碧布依族苗族乡

== Economy ==
Guizhou Power Grid, the Guizhou subsidiary of China Southern Power Grid is headquartered in Nanming District, as is Sinopec Guizhou, the Guizhou subsidiary of Sinopec.

== Notable Buildings ==
Nanming District is home to provincial and prefecture-level government buildings including:

- Guizhou Provincial Committee of the Chinese Communist Party
- Guizhou TV Station
- Guiyang TV Station
- Guiyang City Library

The district is also home to various research and academic institutions including, but not limited to:

- Guiyang College
- Guiyang College of Finance and Economics (not the same as Guiyang College)
- Guizhou Education College,
- Guizhou Light Industry Vocational and Technical College
- Guizhou Police Vocational and Technical College.

Also within the district are various tourist attractions including:

- Jiaxiu Tower - built in the 25th year of Wanli Ming Dynasty
- Hebin Park
- Qianming Temple
- Guanfengtai Meteorological Observatory built in the 32nd year of Wanli Ming Dynasty.
