= List of universities and colleges in Guizhou =

The following is List of Universities and Colleges in Guizhou.

| Name | Chinese name | Type | Location | Note |
|---|---|---|---|---|
| Guizhou University | 贵州大学 | Provincial | Guiyang | Project 211 Double First Class |
| Guizhou Medical University | 贵州医科大学 | Provincial | Guiyang | |
| Zunyi Medical College | 遵义医学院 | Provincial | Zunyi | |
| Guiyang College of Traditional Chinese Medicine | 贵阳中医药学院 | Provincial | Guiyang | |
| Guizhou Normal University | 贵州师范大学 | Provincial | Guiyang | |
| Zunyi Normal University | 遵义师范学院 | Provincial | Zunyi | |
| Tongren University | 铜仁学院 | Provincial | Tongren | |
| Xingyi Normal University for Nationalities | 兴义民族师范学院 | Provincial | Qianxinan | |
| Anshun University | 安顺学院 | Provincial | Anshun | |
| Guizhou University of Engineering Science | 贵州工程应用技术学院 | Provincial | Bijie | |
| Kaili University | 凯里学院 | Provincial | Qiandongnan | |
| Qiannan Normal College for Nationalities | 黔南民族师范学院 | Provincial | Qiannan | |
| Guizhou University of Finance and Economics | 贵州财经大学 | Provincial | Guiyang | |
| Guizhou Minzu University | 贵州民族大学 | Provincial | Guiyang | |
| Guiyang University | 贵阳学院 | Provincial | Guiyang | |
| Liupanshui Normal University | 六盘水师范学院 | Provincial | Liupanshui | |
| Guizhou University of Commerce | 贵州商学院 | Provincial | Guiyang | |
| Guizhou Police College | 贵州警察学院 | Provincial | Guiyang | |
| Shizhen Institute, Guiyang College of Traditional Chinese Medicine | 贵阳中医药学院时珍学院 | Private | Guiyang | |
| Business College, Guizhou University of Finance and Economics | 贵阳财经大学商务学院 | Private | Qiannan | |
| College of Science and Technology, Guizhou University | 贵州大学科技学院 | Private | Guiyang | |
| Mingde College, Guizhou University | 贵州大学明德学院 | Private | Guiyang | |
| College of Humanities and Science, Guizhou Minzu University | 贵州民族大学人文科技学院 | Private | Guiyang | |
| Qiushi College, Guizhou Normal University | 贵州师范大学求是学院 | Private | Guiyang | |
| School of Medicine and Science, Zunyi Medical College | 遵义医学院医学与科技学院 | Private | Zunyi | |
| Shenqi Ethnic Medical College, Guizhou Medical University | 贵州医科大学神奇民族医药学院 | Private | Guiyang | |
| Guizhou Normal College | 贵州师范学院 | Provincial | Guiyang | |
| Guizhou Institute of Technology | 贵州理工学院 | Provincial | Guiyang | |
| Moutai University | 茅台学院 | Private | Zunyi | |
