= Zhou Jiankun =

Chinese politician

- 周建琨

Vice Chairman of the Guizhou Provincial Committee of the Chinese People's Political Consultative Conference
- In office January 2020 – January 2023
- Chairman: Liu Xiaokai

Personal details
- Born: June 1960 (age 66) Ye County, Henan, China
- Party: Chinese Communist Party (1984–2023; expelled)
- Education: Guizhou University of Finance and Economics; Central Party School of the Chinese Communist Party

Zhou Jiankun (Chinese: 周建琨; pinyin: Zhōu Jiànkūn; born June 1960) is a former Chinese politician who spent his entire career in southwest China's Guizhou province. He was investigated by China's top anti-graft agency in November 2022. Previously he served as vice chairman of the Guizhou Provincial Committee of the Chinese People's Political Consultative Conference.

== Early life and education ==
Zhou was born in Ye County, Henan, in June 1960. Between August 1977 and October 1978, he was a sent-down youth in Guiding County. In 1978, he entered Guizhou University of Finance and Economics, where he majored in industrial economy.

== Career ==
After graduating in 1982, he was assigned to the Economic Research Office of Qiannan Buyei and Miao Autonomous Prefectural People's Government, and worked until October 1995. He joined the Chinese Communist Party (CCP) in December 1984. After a short term as deputy party secretary of Weng'an County, he was transferred to Duyun as vice mayor in January 1997. In November 1997, he became deputy party secretary of Duyun, rising to party secretary in May 2001. He also served as mayor from March 1998 to May 2001. In July 2001, he was admitted to member of the CCP Qiannan Buyei and Miao Autonomous Prefectural Committee, the prefecture's top authority.

He was deputy director of Guizhou Provincial Economic and Trade Commission (later reshuffled as Guizhou Provincial Economic and Information Technology Commission) in October 2006 and subsequently deputy secretary-general of Guizhou Provincial People's Government in February 2011.

He became mayor of Anshun in December 2011, and then party secretary, the top political position in the city, beginning in March 2013. In November 2016, he was assigned to the similar position in Bijie. He concurrently served as chairman of its People's Congress from January 2017 to November 2020. He took the position of vice chairman of the Jilin Provincial Committee the Guizhou Provincial Committee of the Chinese People's Political Consultative Conference, the provincial advisory body, in January 2020.

== Downfall ==
On 27 November 2022, Zhou was suspected of "serious violations of laws and regulations" by the Central Commission for Discipline Inspection (CCDI), the party's internal disciplinary body, and the National Supervisory Commission, the highest anti-corruption agency of China.

On 9 June 2023, he was expelled from the CCP and removed from public office.

On 26 March 2024, he stood trial at the First Intermediate People's Court of Chongqing on charges of taking bribes. Prosecutors accused Zhou of taking advantage of his different positions in Guizhou between 1999 and 2022 to seek profits for various companies and individuals in business operations, project contracting, project approval and other matters from 1999 to 2022, and accepted money and valuables worth over 108 million yuan (about 15.22 million U.S. dollars) in return. he was sentenced to life in prison on charges of accepting bribes by the First Intermediate People's Court of Chongqing. He was deprived of political rights for life, and all of his personal property will be confiscated.

Government offices
Preceded by Luo Ning	Mayor of Anshun; 2011–2013	Succeeded by Wang Shujun
Party political offices
Preceded by Chen Jian	Communist Party Secretary of Anshun; 2013–2016	Succeeded by Zeng Yongtao
Preceded by Chen Zhigang	Communist Party Secretary of Bijie; 2016–2021	Succeeded by Wu Qiang
