= Song Bao'an =

Chinese academic

- 宋宝安

President of Guizhou University
- Incumbent
- Assumed office 12 May 2018
- Preceded by: Chen Jian

Personal details
- Born: February 1963 (age 63) Shenzhen, Guangdong, China
- Party: Chinese Communist Party
- Education: Guizhou University; Shenyang Research Institute of Chemical Industry; Nanjing Agricultural University
- Occupation: Pesticide expert

Chinese name
- Traditional Chinese: 宋寶安
- Simplified Chinese: 宋宝安
Transcriptions
Standard Mandarin
- Hanyu Pinyin: Sòng Bǎo'ān

Song Bao'an (Chinese: 宋宝安; born February 1963) is a Chinese pesticide expert and the current president of Guizhou University. He entered the workforce in August 1986, and joined the Chinese Communist Party in June 1997. He was a delegate to the 13th National People's Congress.

== Biography ==
Song was born into a military camp in Shenzhen, Guangdong, in February 1963, while his ancestral home is in Yuanjiang, Hunan. He was raised in Shiqian County, Guizhou. He attended Guizhou University where he received his Bachelor of Science degree in July 1983. After completing his Master of Engineering degree at Shenyang Research Institute of Chemical Industry, he attended Nanjing Agricultural University where he obtained his Doctor of Science degree in December 2003. From 2001 to 2002 he was a visiting scholar at the University of California, Berkeley.

After university, in 1986, he joined the faculty of Guizhou University. In May 2018, he became president of Guizhou University, replacing Chen Jian.

== Honors and awards ==
- 1998 State Science and Technology Progress Award (Third Class)
- 2007 State Science and Technology Progress Award (Second Class)
- 2012 Science and Technology Innovation Award of the Ho Leung Ho Lee Foundation
- 2014 State Science and Technology Progress Award (Second Class)
- December 2015 Member of the Chinese Academy of Engineering (CAE)
- 2019 State Science and Technology Progress Award (Second Class)

Educational offices
Preceded by Chen Jian	President of Guizhou University; 2018	Incumbent
