= Wu Qiang =

Wu Qiang may refer to:

- Wu Qiang (officeholder)
- Wu Qiang (rower)
