= Baiyun District, Guiyang =

Baiyun 白云区
- District
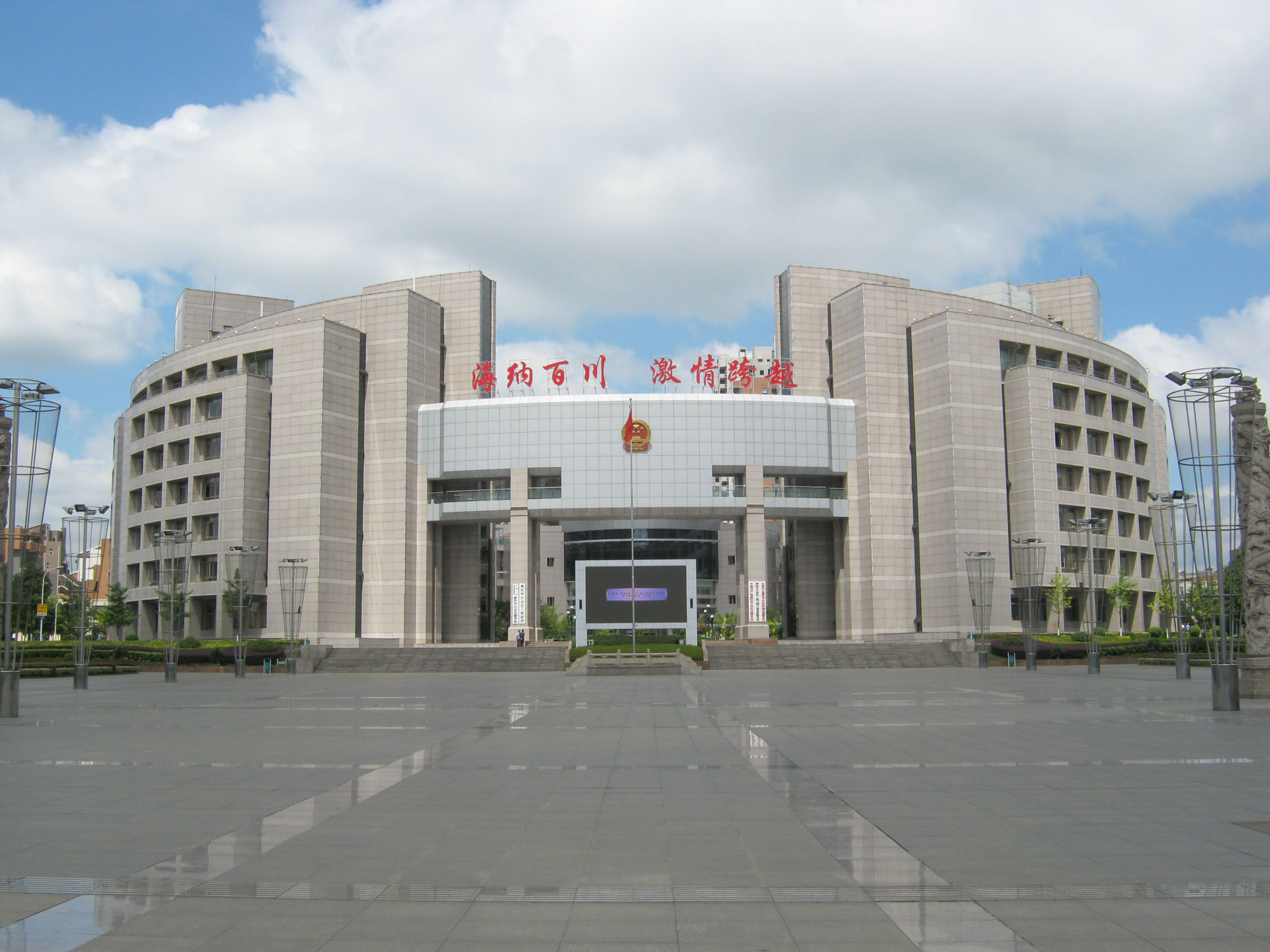

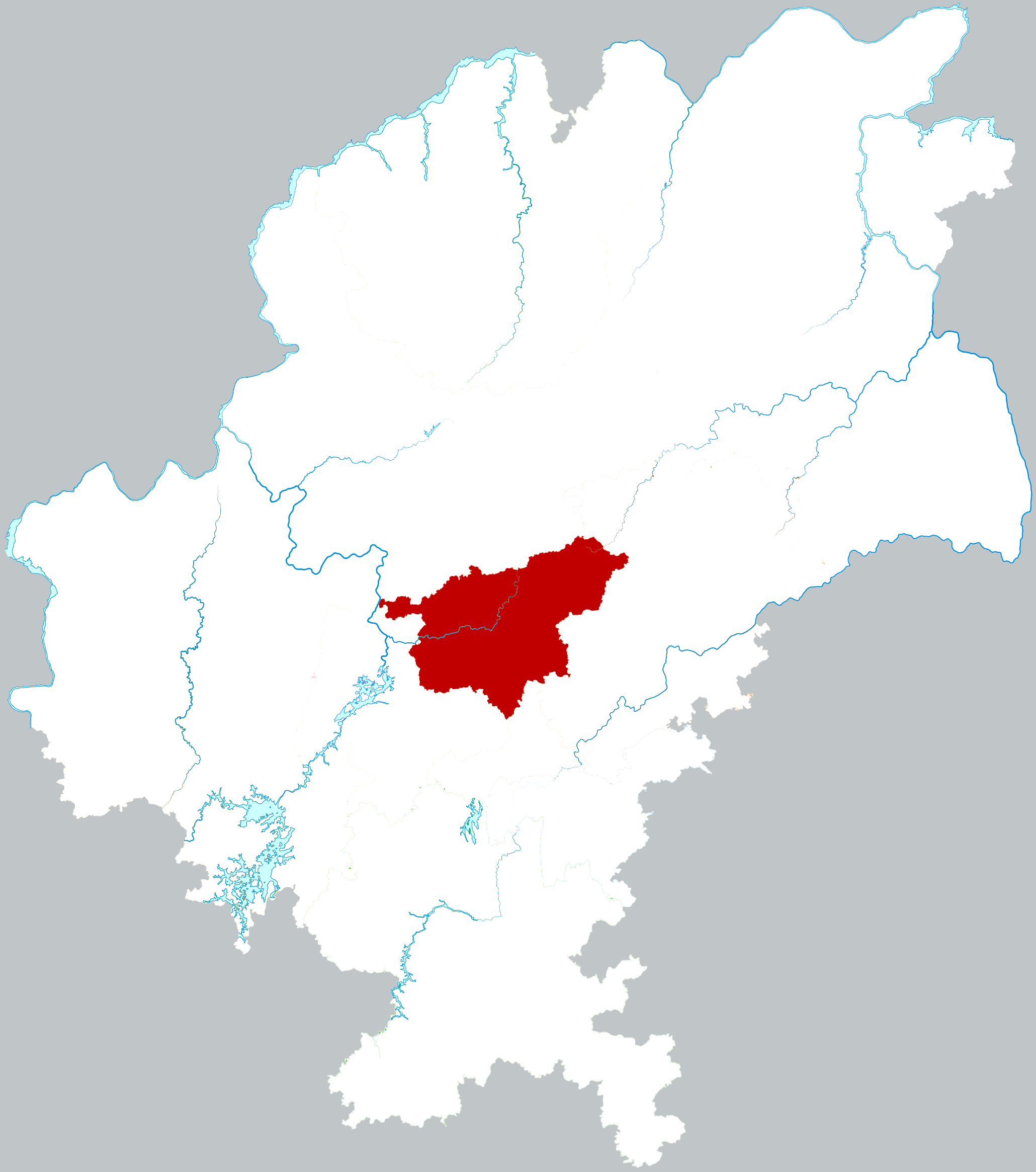
- Baiyun in Guiyang

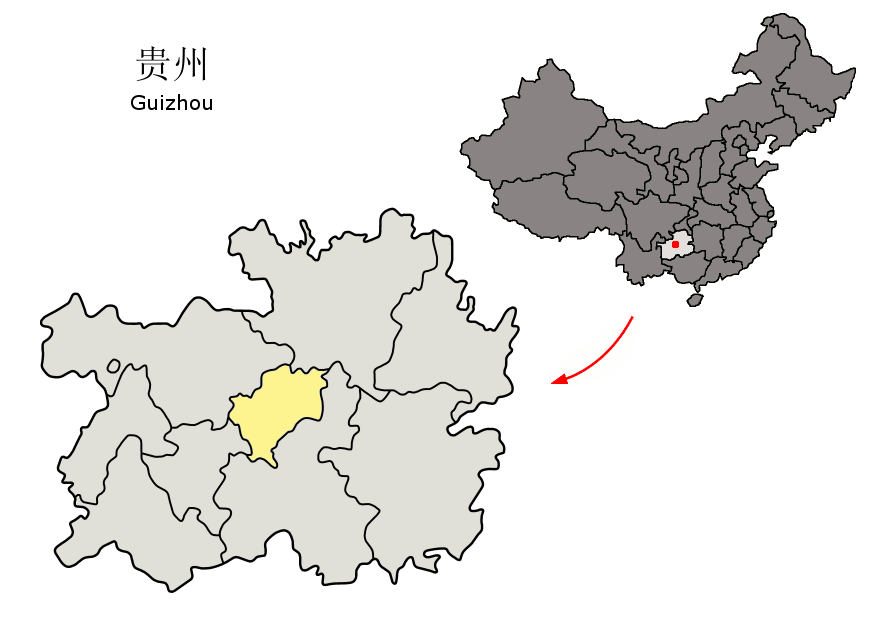
- Guiyang in Guizhou
- Coordinates (Baiyun District government): 26°40′40″N 106°37′23″E
- Country: China
- Province: Guizhou
- Prefecture-level city: Guiyang

Area
  - Total: 260 km^{2} (100 sq mi)

Population (2010)
  - Total: 264,543
  - Density: 1,000/km^{2} (2,600/sq mi)
- Time zone: UTC+8 (China Standard)

Baiyun District (simplified Chinese: 白云区; traditional Chinese: 白雲區; pinyin: Báiyún Qū) is one of six urban districts of the prefecture-level city of Guiyang, the capital of Guizhou Province, China.

== Administrative divisions ==
Baiyun District comprises 5 subdistricts, 3 towns and 2 ethnic townships:

subdistricts

- Quanhu Subdistrict 泉湖街道
- Dashandong Subdistrict 大山洞街道
- Yuncheng Subdistrict 云城街道
- Gongjiazhai Subdistrict 龚家寨街道
- Dulaying Subdistrict 都拉营街道

towns

- Yanshanhong Town 艳山红镇
- Maijia Town 麦架镇
- Shawen Town 沙文镇

ethnic townships

- Dula Bouyei Ethnic Township 都拉布依族乡
- Niuchang Bouyei Ethnic Township 牛场布依族乡

== Climate ==
Climate data for Baiyun, elevation 1,299 m (4,262 ft), (1991–2020 normals, extremes 1981–present)
Month	Jan	Feb	Mar	Apr	May	Jun	Jul	Aug	Sep	Oct	Nov	Dec	Year
Record high °C (°F)	23.0 (73.4)	27.4 (81.3)	31.5 (88.7)	32.0 (89.6)	33.2 (91.8)	31.4 (88.5)	33.3 (91.9)	33.4 (92.1)	32.3 (90.1)	29.0 (84.2)	24.4 (75.9)	22.3 (72.1)	33.4 (92.1)
Mean daily maximum °C (°F)	6.7 (44.1)	10.2 (50.4)	14.6 (58.3)	19.9 (67.8)	22.8 (73.0)	24.6 (76.3)	26.7 (80.1)	27.0 (80.6)	23.9 (75.0)	18.6 (65.5)	14.6 (58.3)	9.1 (48.4)	18.2 (64.8)
Daily mean °C (°F)	3.5 (38.3)	6.1 (43.0)	10.0 (50.0)	15.0 (59.0)	18.3 (64.9)	20.7 (69.3)	22.5 (72.5)	22.3 (72.1)	19.4 (66.9)	14.8 (58.6)	10.6 (51.1)	5.4 (41.7)	14.1 (57.3)
Mean daily minimum °C (°F)	1.4 (34.5)	3.4 (38.1)	7.0 (44.6)	11.6 (52.9)	15.0 (59.0)	18.0 (64.4)	19.6 (67.3)	19.0 (66.2)	16.2 (61.2)	12.3 (54.1)	7.8 (46.0)	2.9 (37.2)	11.2 (52.1)
Record low °C (°F)	−7.3 (18.9)	−6.9 (19.6)	−5.5 (22.1)	0.8 (33.4)	5.5 (41.9)	8.4 (47.1)	10.2 (50.4)	12.5 (54.5)	6.3 (43.3)	0.0 (32.0)	−3.8 (25.2)	−7.3 (18.9)	−7.3 (18.9)
Average precipitation mm (inches)	26.5 (1.04)	23.2 (0.91)	42.0 (1.65)	91.9 (3.62)	184.2 (7.25)	231.1 (9.10)	216.1 (8.51)	126.6 (4.98)	90.6 (3.57)	97.5 (3.84)	40.0 (1.57)	21.2 (0.83)	1,190.9 (46.87)
Average precipitation days (≥ 0.1 mm)	17.0	14.3	16.7	15.8	17.4	17.7	15.8	13.4	11.3	16.5	11.9	13.2	181
Average snowy days	4.3	2.2	0.4	0.1	0	0	0	0	0	0	0.1	1.6	8.7
Average relative humidity (%)	85	82	80	77	77	81	79	77	78	82	81	81	80
Mean monthly sunshine hours	34.4	53.2	77.2	103.4	115.4	92.5	144.7	159.7	120.6	75.7	70.6	49.4	1,096.8
Percentage possible sunshine	10	17	21	27	28	22	34	40	33	21	22	15	24
Source: China Meteorological Administration

== Economy ==
The Guizhou subsidiary of Aluminum Corporation of China is headquartered in Baiyun District.

== See also ==
- Baiyun Stadium
