= Qingyan =

Qingyan 青岩镇
- Town
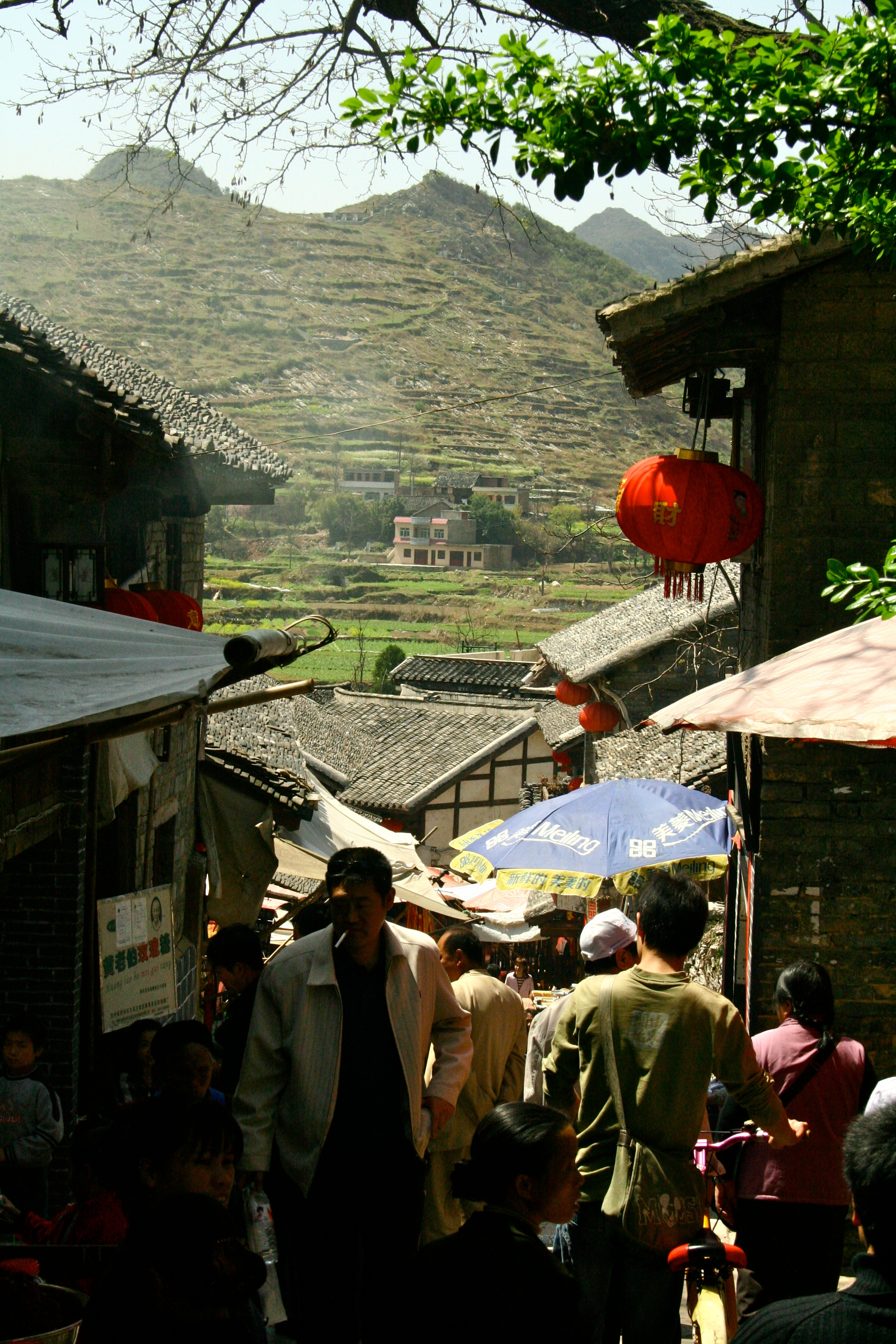

- Location in Guizhou
- Coordinates: 26°20′03″N 106°41′04″E
- Country: People's Republic of China
- Province: Guizhou
- Prefecture-level city: Guiyang
- District: Huaxi

Area
  - Total: 92.3 km^{2} (35.6 sq mi)

Population (2017)
  - Total: 30,707
  - Density: 333/km^{2} (862/sq mi)
- Time zone: UTC+08:00 (China Standard)
- Postal code: 550027
- Area code: 0851

Chinese name
- Simplified Chinese: 青岩镇
- Traditional Chinese: 青巖鎮
Transcriptions
Standard Mandarin
- Hanyu Pinyin: Qīngyán Zhèn

Qingyan (Chinese: 青岩镇) is a town in Huaxi District of Guiyang, Guizhou, China. As of the 2017 census it had a population of 30,707 and an area of 92.3-square-kilometre (35.6 sq mi). It is surrounded by Yanlou Township and Maling Township on the west, Qiantao Township on the east, and Huishui County on the south. Eleven ethnic groups, including Han, Miao, Bouyei, Dong and Zhuang, live in the town.

== Etymology ==
The name, Qingyan, comes from an ancient book named New Records of Guizhou Illustrated Classics (贵州图经新志).

== History ==
In early Ming dynasty (1368–1644), Qingyan was a military outpost. In the Tianqi period (1621–1627) of the Ming dynasty, Ban Lingui (班麟贵), a Bouyei tusi, founded a castle. In 1572, Qingyansi (青岩司) was set up.

In 1687, in the 26th year of Kangxi era (1662–1722) of the Qing dynasty (1644–1911), Qingyan came under the jurisdiction of Guizhu County (贵筑县).

In 1914, Qingyan was incorporated as a town. In 1931, Qingyan upgraded to a district. In 1941, Qingyan was under the jurisdiction of Yanlou District (燕楼区) of Guizhou County.

After the establishment of the Communist State in 1949, the Second District was set up in the town. In 1953, it was reverted to its former name of "Qingyan Town". In 1958, it was changed to a People's Commune. In 1984, Qingyan was renamed "Qingyan Township" and two years later it was reverted to its former name of "Qingyan Town". In 2016, it was listed as the first batch of "Small Towns with Chinese Characteristics" by the Ministry of Housing and Urban-Rural Development. On February 25, 2017, it was rated as a National 5A Tourist Attraction.

== Administrative division ==
As of 2017, the town is divided into seventeen villages and two communities:

- Ming Qing Street Community (明清街社区)
- East Street Community (东街社区)
- South Street (南街村)
- West Street (西街村)
- North Street (北街村)
- Waijiao (歪脚村)
- Shanwangmiao (山王庙村)
- Baituo (摆托村)
- Yangmei (杨眉村)
- Baizao (摆早村)
- Xinshao (新哨村)
- Siqian (思潜村)
- Dahang (达夯村)
- Gutong (谷通村)
- Xinlou (新楼村)
- Erguan (二关村)
- Daba (大坝村)
- Longjing (龙井村)
- Xinguan (新关村)

== Geography ==
=== Climate ===
The town is in the middle subtropical monsoon zone, with an average annual temperature of 15 °C (59 °F), total annual rainfall of 1,100-millimetre (43 in) to 1,200-millimetre (47 in), a frost-free period of 273 to 280 days and annual average sunshine hours in 1200 to 1300 hours.

Qingyan River (青岩河), Yangmei River (杨眉河) and Zhaosi River (赵司河) flow through the town.

== Economy ==
Tourism is the main source of local income.

== Transport ==
National Highway G210 passes across the town.

== Attractions ==
The town has many historic buildings, including the Former Residence of Zhao Yijiong (赵以炯故居), Ancestral Hall of Marshal Zhao (赵公专祠), Wenchang Pavilion (文昌阁), Longevity Palace (万寿宫), North Gate (北城门), and Dingguang Gate (定广门).

== See also ==
- List of township-level divisions of Guizhou
