= China–the Gambia relations =

- China: Gambia

China has an embassy in Banjul, while The Gambia has an embassy in Beijing.

== History ==
In July 1995, The Gambia recognized the Republic of China (Taiwan), prompting the People's Republic of China to suspend its foreign relations with Gambia. China-The Gambia relations were re-established on March 17, 2016, and The Gambia no longer recognizes Taiwan.

The Gambia joined the Belt and Road Initiative (BRI) in 2018.

== Educational exchanges ==
To strengthen educational exchanges and bilateral ties, the public University of The Gambia in 2018 signed a memorandum of understanding with China's Guizhou University to establish a Confucius Institute at the University of The Gambia.

== Political relations ==
The Gambia follows the one China principle. It recognizes the People's Republic of China as the sole government of China and Taiwan as an integral part of China's territory, and supports all efforts by the PRC to "achieve national reunification". It also considers Hong Kong, Xinjiang and Tibet to be China's internal affairs.
