= Sven Hessle =

Swedish psychologist

Sven Hessle, born 1941, is a Swedish Authorized Psychologist, and Professor of Social work at Stockholm University.

His research concerns the study of poverty and children and their families in an international perspective as well as International social work in general. He has published alone, co-edited or contributed in some 35 books, most of them in Swedish. Some of them translated to other languages: Danish, English, Finnish, Japanese, Portuguese, Russian, Serbo-Croatian and Vietnamese. He is founder of and the Editor-in-Chief of the International Journal of Social Welfare. He was given the Katherine Kendall Award from IASSW in August 2006, for his distinguished contributions in the international social work education. 2014 he received The Harald Swedner Award from ICSD (the International Consortium for Social Development) for exceptional international contributions for social development He is Professor of honour at Beijing Normal University and Guizhou Minzu University in China. He is a senior advisor for different organisations including UNICEF, Sida, and Norad.

== Works ==
- "The Alexander Case - A confiscated child". Svenska Dagbladet, July 3, 1984
- "Child Welfare in Sweden - an overview"
- Sven Hessle; Bo Vinnerljung (2000). Child welfare in Sweden: an overview. Stockholm University. ISBN 978-91-7153-964-9.
- Sven Hessle; Marilyn Callahan; Susan Strega, eds. (2000). Valuing the field: child welfare in an international context. Ashgate. ISBN 978-0-7546-1183-7.
- Lena Dominelli; Wanda Thomas Bernard, eds. (2003). "Network Collaboration within Swedish Child Welfare". Broadening horizons: international exchanges in social work. Ashgate Publishing, Ltd. ISBN 978-0-7546-1945-1.
