= Qianming Temple =

Buddhist temple in Guiyang, China

- 黔明寺
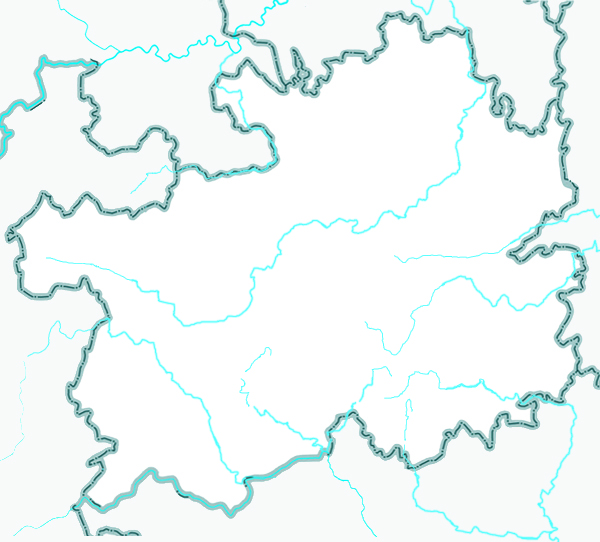

- Location within Guizhou

Religion
- Affiliation: Buddhism
- Sect: Chan Buddhism

Location
- Location: Nanming District, Guizhou, Guiyang
- Country: China
- Coordinates: 26°34′50″N 106°43′32″E

Architecture
- Style: Chinese architecture
- Established: 17th century
- Completed: 1771 (reconstruction)

Qianming Temple (Chinese: 黔明寺; pinyin: Qiánmíng Sì) is a Buddhist temple located in Nanming District of Guizhou, Guiyang, China.

== History ==
Qianming Temple was first established in the 17th century, in the late Ming dynasty (1368–1644), the modern temple was founded in 1771 in the reign of Qianlong Emperor of the Qing dynasty (1644–1911). During that time, monk Xiandu (显笃) settled at the temple and taught Buddhism there. After the fall of the Qing Empire in the 19th century, most part of the temple were ruined in wars and natural disasters. A local landlord Shu Zhuping (舒竹平) occupied the temple illegally and changed it as his ancestral temple.

In 1932, three steles were unearthed in the temple which records the reconstruction history of Qianming Temple. Abbot Guangmiao (广妙) of Qixia Temple (栖霞寺) accused Shu Zhuping of embezzlement of temple buildings to the court. Shu Zhuping returned the occupied hall and it restored the original name. Guangmiao was proposed as the new abbot of Qianming Temple. During his tenure, he added the Hall of Maitreya and Buddhist Texts Library. After he died in 1946, Xukuan (续宽) replaced him as the new abbot.

During the Second Sino-Japanese War, prominent Buddhist masters like Taixu and Hsu Yun resided in the temple chanting and practicing scriptures. In 1945, Tibetan Tulku Shenglu (圣露活佛) taught Vajrayana at the temple.

After the establishment of PRC in 1949, the temple became dilapidated for neglect. Qianming Temple was badly damaged during the ten years devastating Cultural Revolution. Almost all of the valuable Buddhist scriptures and historical documents, Buddha statues, and other works of art were either removed, damaged or destroyed. Buddhist monks were forced to disrobe and return to secular life.

After the 3rd Plenary Session of the 11th Central Committee of the Chinese Communist Party, according to the national policy of free religious belief, regular scripture lectures, meditation and other features of temple life were resumed. The local government allocated one million yuan to refurbished the temple.

Qianming Temple was designated as a municipal cultural unit in 1981 and a provincial level key cultural heritage in 1983. Qianming Temple was officially reopened to the public in 1983, that same year, it was classified as a National Key Buddhist Temple in Han Chinese Area by the State Council of China.

== Architecture ==
The complex of Qianming Temple include the following halls: Shanmen, Mahavira Hall, Dabei Pavilion, Bell tower, Drum tower, Buddhist Texts Library, Dharma Hall, dining Room, etc.

=== Mahavira Hall ===
The Mahavira Hall is the main hall in the temple. In the middle is Sakyamuni, statues of Ananda and Maha Kassapa stand on the left and right sides of Sakyamuni's statue. And statues of Manjushri and Samantabhadra stand at the back of Sakyamuni's statue. The statues of Eighteen Arhats stand on both sides of the hall.

=== Dabei Pavilion ===
The Dabei Pavilion (大悲阁; 'Great Compassion Pavilion') enshrining the statue of Thousand Handed and Eyed Guanyin, with Shancai standing on the left and Longnü on the right. Statues of Amitabha and Kṣitigarbha are placed on both sides. There is a plaque under the eaves is a plaque with the Chinese characters written by Zhao Puchu (the then president of the Buddhist Association of China): "Dabei Pavilion". In front of the hall, a wooden plaque with a couplet is hung on the two side pillars: "誓愿宏深处处现身说法；慈悲广大时时救苦寻声". It was inscribed by the honorary president of Guizhou Museum Chen Heng'an (陈恒安).
