= Baiyun Stadium =

Multi-use stadium in Guiyang, China

Coordinates: 26°40′18″N 106°38′03″E

Baiyun Stadium (Simplified Chinese: 白云体育场) is a multi-use stadium in Baiyun District, Guiyang, China. It is currently used mostly for football matches. The stadium holds 12,000 people.
