= Changwang noodles =

Chinese noodle soup dish

Changwang noodles (Chinese: 肠旺面; pinyin: Cháng wàng miàn, transl. intestine & pork blood noodles) is a popular snack in Guiyang City, Guizhou Province, China. It is a type of noodle soup made with intestines and pork blood as additional ingredients.

These noodles are believed to have originated in Yunyan District during the Tongzhi period of the Qing Dynasty. Su Desheng, a native of Guiyang during the Republic of China period, is credited with further refining the dish.
