= International Journal of Social Welfare =

- Discipline: Social Work
- Language: English
- Edited by: Åke Bergmark and Jill Duerr Berrick

Publication details
- Former name: Scandinavian Journal of Social Welfare
- History: 1992-Present
- Publisher: Wiley-Blackwell
- Frequency: Quarterly
- Impact factor: 1.4 (2024)

Standard abbreviations
- ISO 4: Int. J. Soc. Welf.

Indexing
- ISSN: 1468-2397

Links
- Journal homepage; Online access; Online archive

International Journal of Social Welfare is a quarterly peer-reviewed academic journal published by Wiley-Blackwell. The journal was established by Sven Hessle in 1992 as Scandinavian Journal of Social Welfare, obtaining its current name in 1999. The journal covers topics associated with social welfare and social work and their regional and global implications. The current editors-in-chief are Åke Bergmark and Jill Duerr Berrick.

== Aims and scope ==
Coverage of the journal includes current interdisciplinary research and comparative perspective of the most pressing social welfare issues of various branches of the applied social sciences. The focus includes social issues related to migration, economy, policy, case studies, protection, mental health, gender, age, and class. According to the Journal Citation Reports, the journal has a 2024 impact factor of 1.4.
