= Guizhou Medical University =

University in China

- 贵州医科大学
- Former names: Guizhou Medical University
- Type: Public university
- Established: 1938
- President: Zhong NanShan
- Vice-Chancellor: Xin Ge
- Administrative staff: 2484
- Students: 19097
- Postgraduates: 1862
- Location: Guiyang, Guizhou, China
- Campus: Urban, 1868 Mu, 125 ha (307.73 acres)
- Colours
- Website: www.gmc.edu.cn

Guizhou Medical University (simplified Chinese: 贵州医科大学; traditional Chinese: 貴州醫科大學; pinyin: Guìzhōu Yīkē Dàxué) is a public university based in Guiyang, capital of Guizhou province in China that offers courses in pharmacy, medical laboratory science, preventive medicine, nursing and clinical medicine, as well as other subject areas. It is approved by "WHO" and Indian students can take admission in Guizhou Medical University and take the MCI screening test after a 5-year course.

== History ==
The university was founded in 1938 as the National Guiyang Medical University directly administered by the central government in Beijing. In 2008, the university was officially renamed as the Guiyang Medical University and the administrative supervision transferred to Guizhou provincial government. In June 2015, again the university was officially renamed as the Guizhou Medical University. Over the decades, the university has been accredited to offer undergraduate programs in medicine as well as to be the only provincial medical postgraduate university.
