= Guizhou Minzu University =

Provincial public university in Guiyang

Coordinates: 26°27′58″N 106°39′58″E

- 贵州民族大学
- Former name: Guizhou Nationalities University
- Type: Public university
- Established: 1951
- President: Wu Dahua
- Location: Guiyang, Guizhou, China
- Campus: Urban area: 88.3 hectares
- Colours
- Website: www.gzmu.edu.cn

Guizhou Minzu University (simplified Chinese: 贵州民族大学; traditional Chinese: 貴州民族大學; pinyin: Guìzhōu Mínzú Dàxué) is a provincial public university located in Guiyang, capital of Guizhou province, China.

== History ==
The university was established in 1951 as the first institution of higher education to serve indigenous peoples, such as the Zhuang, who inhabit Guizhou Province. In April 2014, it was renamed Guizhou Minzu University.

== See also ==
- Sven Hessle, Professor-In-Honour
