= Guizhou University of Traditional Chinese Medicine =

University in Guiyang, China

- 贵州中医药大学
- Former names: Guiyang College of Traditional Chinese Medicine; National Guiyang Medical University
- Type: Public university
- Established: 1965
- Academic staff: 793
- Administrative staff: 214
- Location: Guiyang, Guizhou, China
- Campus: Urban area, 768.5 Mu (5.1223 ha; 12.657 acres)
- Colours
- Website: www.gzy.edu.cn

Guizhou University of Traditional Chinese Medicine (simplified Chinese: 贵州中医药大学; traditional Chinese: 貴州中醫藥大學; pinyin: guì zhōu zhōng yī yào dà xué) is a public university based in Guiyang, the capital of Guizhou province in China.

== History ==
The university was established in 1965 as the Guiyang College of Traditional Chinese Medicine. It covers 45.65 acres (184,700 m^{2}) divided among two campuses, the North Campus and South Campus. In 2018, it was renamed Guizhou University of Traditional Chinese Medicine.

== Administration ==
=== Schools and departments ===
The university is organised into twelve departments and schools.

- The Law Department
- The Applied Psychology Department
- The Preclinical Medicine Department
- The Pharmacy Department
- Department of Acupuncture Moxibustion and Massage
- Department of Nursing
- Department of Foreign Languages
- The Specialty of Orthopedics and Traumatology
- The Integrated Chinese and Western Clinical Medicine
- The Experimental Animal Research Institute
- Department of Social Sciences
- Department of Physical Education
- Department of Medical Humanities
- First Department of Clinical Medicine
- Second Department of Clinical Medicine
