= Guiyang =

Guiyang 贵阳市
- Prefecture-level city
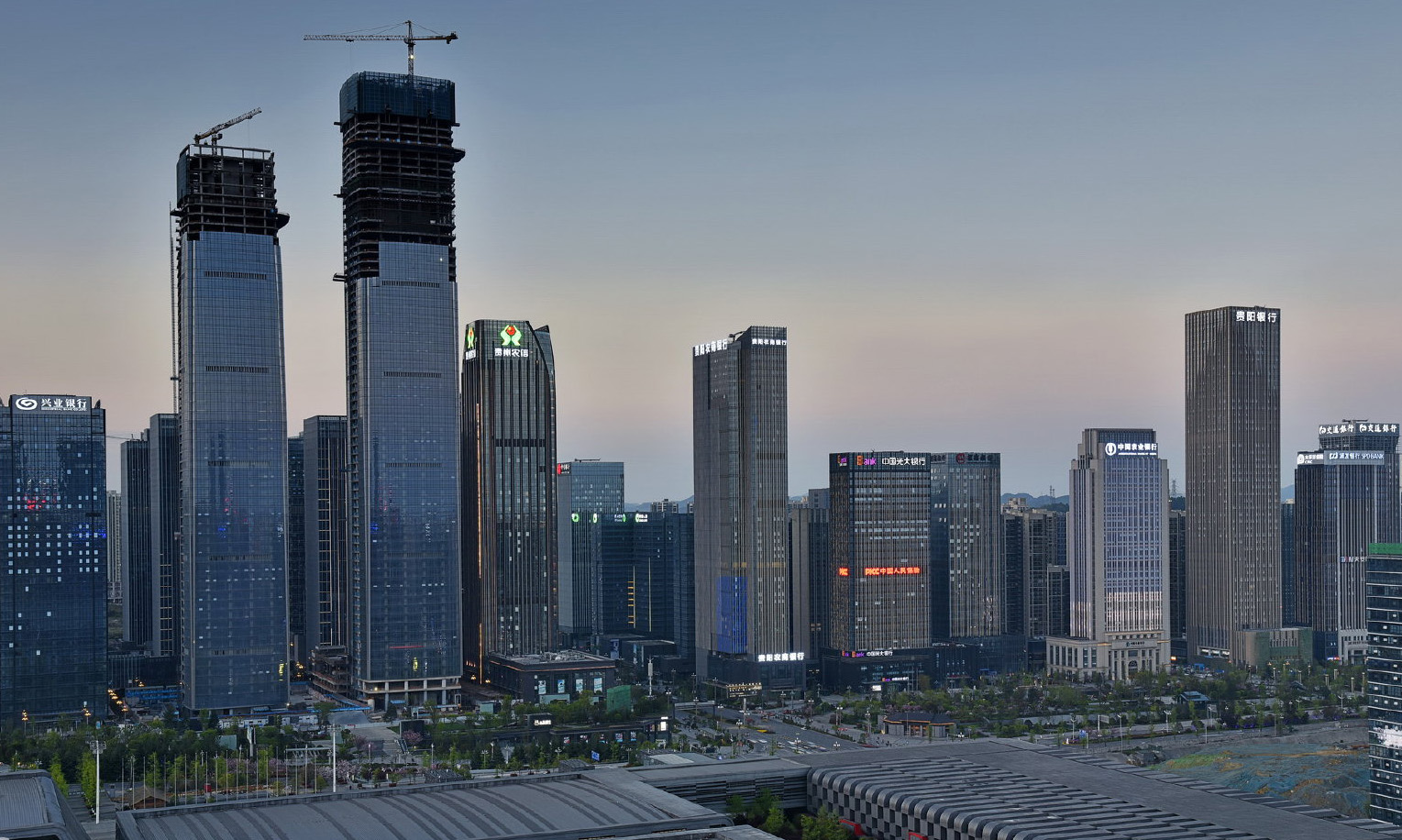
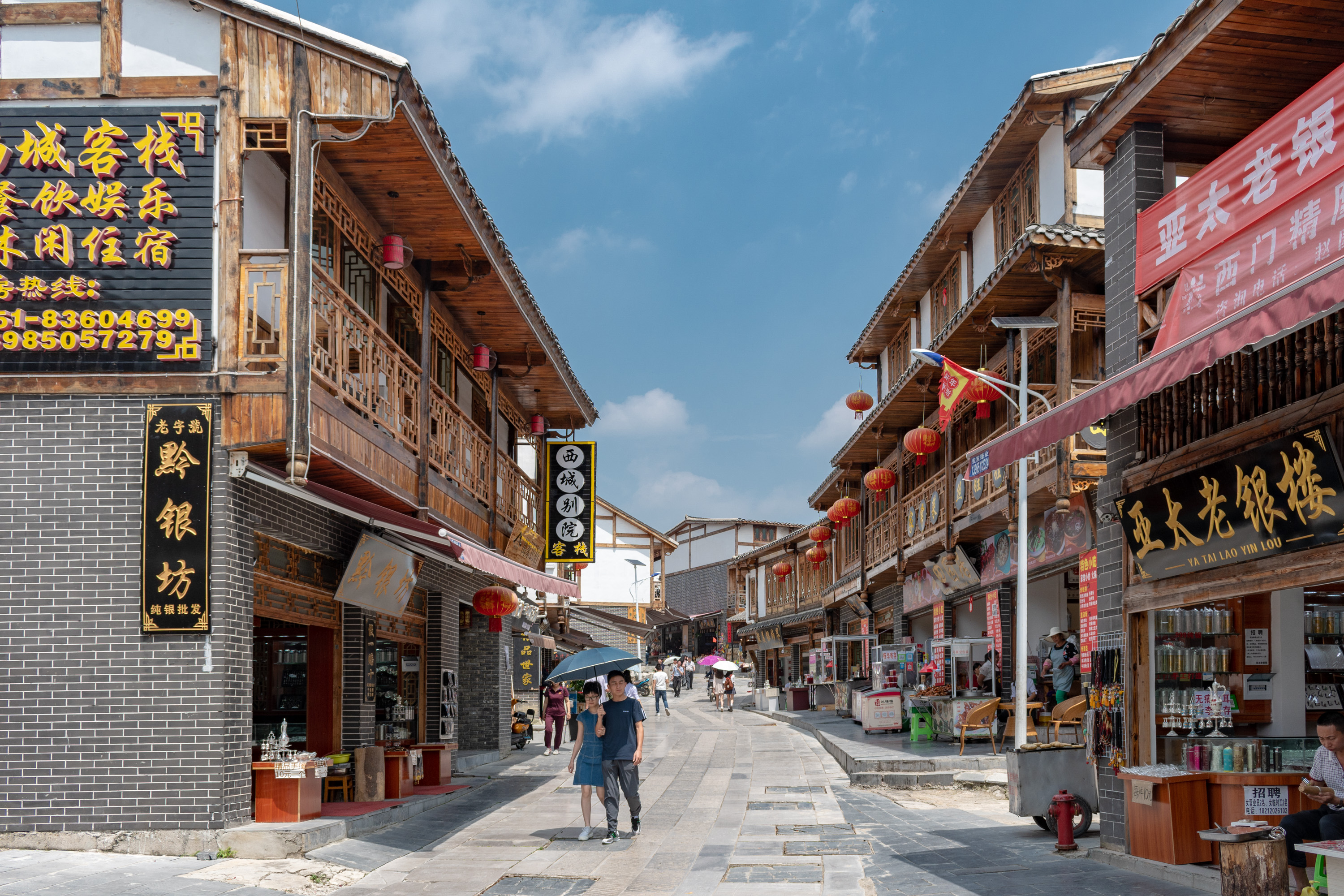
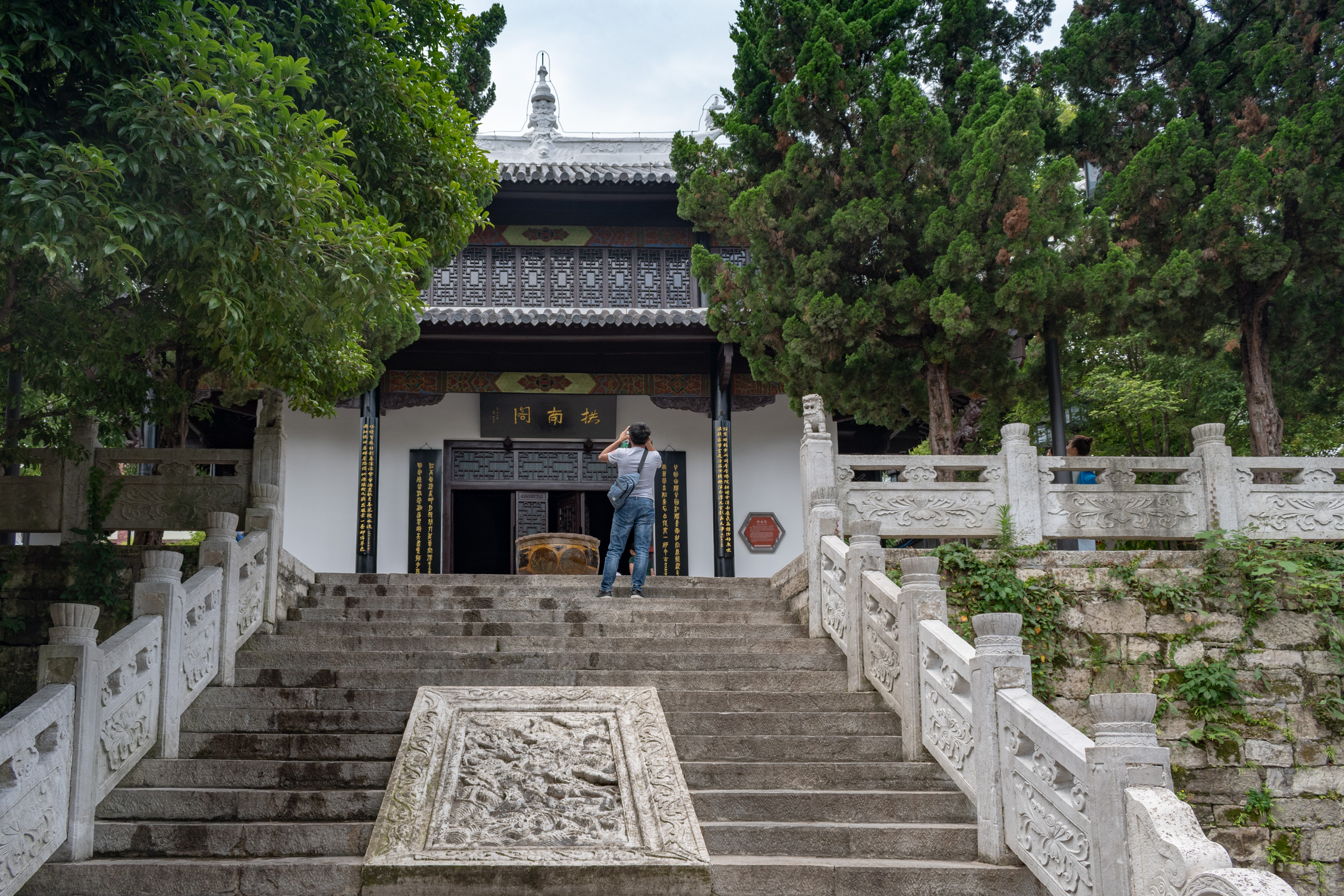
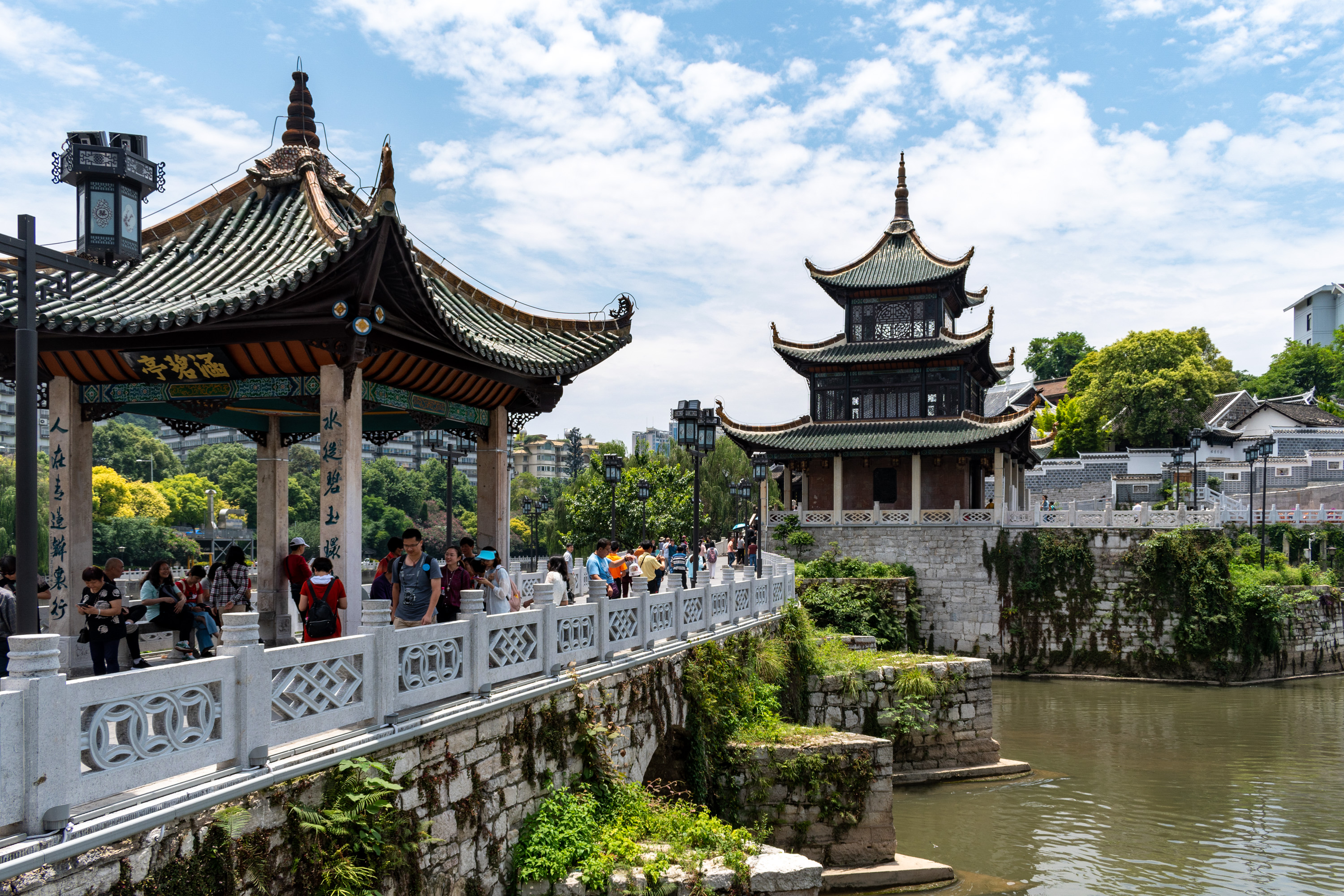
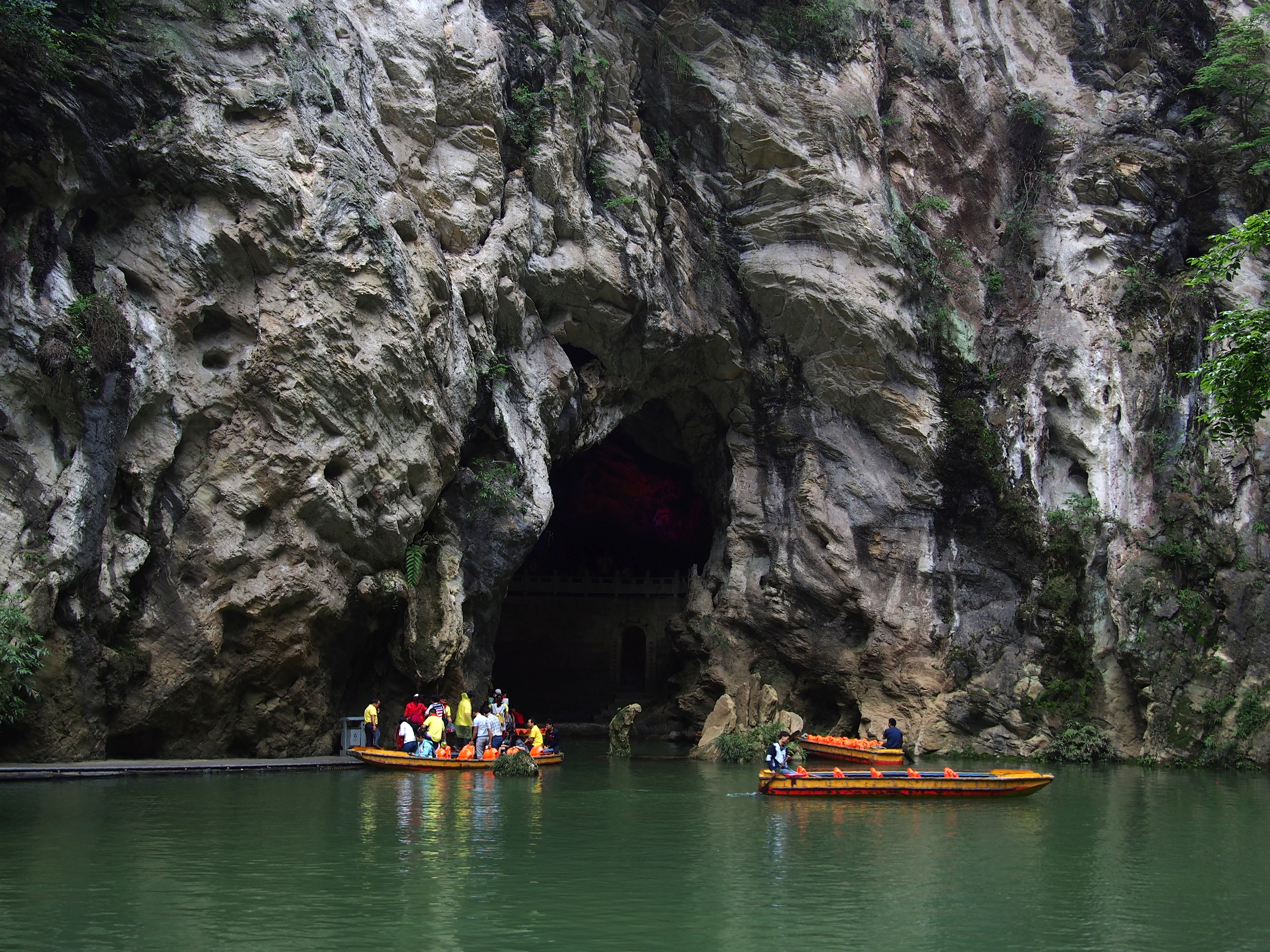
- Guizhou Financial City Qingyan Ancient Town Cuiwei Garden Jiaxiu Pavilion Zhijin Cave
- Nicknames: The Forest City, The Summer Capital of China, The Second Spring City
- Interactive map of Guiyang
- Location in China
- Coordinates (Guiyang municipal government): 26°38′49″N 106°37′48″E
- Country: China
- Province: Guizhou
- Municipal seat: Guanshanhu District

Government
  - Type: Prefecture-level city
  - Body: Guiyang Municipal People's Congress
  - CCP Secretary: Zhao Deming
  - Congress Chairman: Sun Dengfeng
  - Mayor: Chen Yan
  - CPPCC Chairman: Shi Banglin

Area
  - Prefecture-level city: 8,034 km^{2} (3,102 sq mi)
  - Urban: 2,403.4 km^{2} (928.0 sq mi)
  - Metro: 2,403.4 km^{2} (928.0 sq mi)
- Elevation: 1,275 m (4,183 ft)

Population (2020 census)
  - Prefecture-level city: 5,987,018
  - Density: 745.2/km^{2} (1,930/sq mi)
  - Urban: 4,506,134
  - Urban density: 1,874.9/km^{2} (4,856.0/sq mi)
  - Metro: 4,506,134
  - Metro density: 1,874.9/km^{2} (4,856.0/sq mi)

GDP
  - Prefecture-level city: CN¥ 431.2 billion US$ 62.5 billion
  - Per capita: CN¥ 72,246; US$ 10,474
- Time zone: UTC+08:00 (China Standard)
- Postal code: 550000
- Area code: (0)851
- ISO 3166 code: CN-GZ-01
- Licence plate prefixes: 贵A
- Website: gygov.gov.cn
- Symbols
- Flower: Lagerstroemia

Guiyang
- "Guiyang" in Simplified (top) and Traditional (bottom) Chinese
- Simplified Chinese: 贵阳
- Traditional Chinese: 貴陽
- Hanyu Pinyin: Guìyáng
- Postal: Kweiyang
- Literal meaning: "Southern Slope of Guì [Mountain]"
Transcriptions
Standard Mandarin
- Hanyu Pinyin: Guìyáng
- Bopomofo: ㄍㄨㄟˋ ㄧㄤˊ
- Gwoyeu Romatzyh: Gueyyang
- Wade–Giles: Kuei^{4}-yang^{2}
- Yale Romanization: Gwèiyáng
- IPA: [kwêɪ.jǎŋ]
Yue: Cantonese
- Yale Romanization: Gwaiyèuhng
- Jyutping: Gwai3joeng4
- IPA: [kʷɐj˧.jœŋ˩]
Southern Min
- Hokkien POJ: Kùi-iông

Guiyang (Note: /ɡweɪˈjæŋ/; Chinese: 贵阳; pinyin: Guìyáng; Mandarin pronunciation: [kwêɪ.jǎŋ]; alternatively as Kweiyang) is the capital of Guizhou province in the People's Republic of China. It is centrally located within the province, on the eastern part of the Yunnan–Guizhou Plateau, and sits on the north bank of the Nanming River, a tributary of the Wu River. The city is situated at an elevation of approximately 1,100 meters (3,600 ft) and covers an area of 8,034 square kilometers (3,102 sq mi). According to the 2020 census, Guiyang had a total population of 5,987,018, with 4,506,134 lived in its six urban districts. Despite being the capital of Guizhou, it is not the largest city in the province, which is Zunyi.

Guiyang has a humid subtropical climate and is surrounded by mountains and forests. The area has been inhabited since at least the Spring and Autumn period and officially became the provincial capital in 1413, during the Ming dynasty. The city is home to a significant Miao and Bouyei ethnic minority population.

Guiyang has a diversified economy, historically known for aluminum production, phosphate mining, and optical instrument manufacturing. Following economic reforms, the service sector now contributes the majority of the city's economic output. Since 2015, targeted developments in big data have helped Guiyang rapidly emerge as a local innovation hub.

As of 2025, Guiyang is ranked among the top 150 science cities globally based on scientific research outputs, as tracked by the Nature Index. The city is also home to Guizhou University, a national research university under the Project 211 and designated for the Double First-Class Construction in certain disciplines.

== History ==
The valley approximating present-day Guiyang has been inhabited since the Spring and Autumn period. Guiyang was a 7th-century military outpost under the Sui and Tang, when the area around it was known as Juzhou (矩州). It grew into a city named Shunyuan (順元) under the Mongolian Yuan dynasty sometime between their 1279 southwestern campaigns and 1283. By the time Guizhou became a full province in 1413, its capital at Guiyang was also known as Guizhou. It became a prefectural seat under the Ming and Qing. Guiyang grew rapidly during the development of the southwest that occurred after the Japanese invasion of China during World War II. It has also grown rapidly since Deng Xiaoping's reform and opening up reached it in the 1990s.

Guiyang has been designated an ecological civilization pilot city.

== Geography ==
The city's heart is around the Dashizi (大十字), a "big cross", and Penshuichi (喷水池, literally "Fountain Pool"), a traffic intersection, in the center of which there was a large fountain until early 2010, when it was paved over for better traffic.

=== Climate ===
Guiyang

Climate chart (precipitation, max. and min. temperature)
| J | F | M | A | M | J | J | A | S | O | N | D |
| 27 8 2 | 24 11 4 | 47 16 8 | 87 21 12 | 185 24 16 | 214 25 19 | 172 28 20 | 132 28 20 | 89 25 17 | 91 20 13 | 38 15 9 | 23 9 3 |
- █ Average max. and min. temperatures in °C
- █ Precipitation totals in mm
- Source: China Meteorological Administration
Imperial conversion
| J | F | M | A | M | J | J | A | S | O | N | D |
| 1 46 35 | 0.9 52 39 | 1.8 61 46 | 3.4 70 54 | 7.3 75 60 | 8.4 78 65 | 6.8 82 68 | 5.2 82 67 | 3.5 77 63 | 3.6 67 55 | 1.5 60 47 | 0.9 49 38 |
- █ Average max. and min. temperatures in °F
- █ Precipitation totals in inches

Guiyang has a four-season, monsoon-influenced humid subtropical climate (Köppen: Cwa), tempered by its low latitude and high elevation. It has cool winters and moderate-temperature summers; the majority of the year's 1,149 millimetres (45.2 in) of precipitation occurs from May to July. The monthly 24-hour average temperature ranges from 4.6 °C (40.3 °F) in January to 23.8 °C (74.8 °F) in July, while the annual mean is 15.2 °C (59.4 °F). Rain is common throughout the year, with occasional flurries in winter. With monthly possible sunshine ranging from 11% in January to 43% in August, the city receives only 1150 hours of sunshine, making it one of China's least sunny major cities. Average monthly relative humidity is consistently above 75% throughout the year. The moderate temperature together with other factors including air quality, wind speed, etc. made Guiyang to be ranked No.2 in the "Top 10 Summer Capitals of China". Extremes since 1951 have ranged from −7.8 °C (18 °F) on 6 January 1970 (unofficial record of −9.5 °C (15 °F)) was set in January 1925) to 37.5 °C (100 °F) on 5 July 1952.

Climate data for Guiyang, elevation 1,224 m (4,016 ft), (1991–2020 normals, extremes 1951–present)
| Month | Jan | Feb | Mar | Apr | May | Jun | Jul | Aug | Sep | Oct | Nov | Dec | Year |
|---|---|---|---|---|---|---|---|---|---|---|---|---|---|
| Record high °C (°F) | 25.8 (78.4) | 29.7 (85.5) | 31.8 (89.2) | 35.3 (95.5) | 34.6 (94.3) | 35.6 (96.1) | 37.5 (99.5) | 35.9 (96.6) | 34.4 (93.9) | 32.1 (89.8) | 28.6 (83.5) | 26.1 (79.0) | 37.5 (99.5) |
| Mean daily maximum °C (°F) | 7.5 (45.5) | 11.2 (52.2) | 15.9 (60.6) | 20.9 (69.6) | 23.8 (74.8) | 25.4 (77.7) | 27.7 (81.9) | 27.9 (82.2) | 24.9 (76.8) | 19.6 (67.3) | 15.4 (59.7) | 9.3 (48.7) | 19.1 (66.4) |
| Daily mean °C (°F) | 4.0 (39.2) | 6.7 (44.1) | 10.9 (51.6) | 15.6 (60.1) | 18.9 (66.0) | 21.2 (70.2) | 23.2 (73.8) | 22.8 (73.0) | 20.1 (68.2) | 15.6 (60.1) | 11.2 (52.2) | 5.7 (42.3) | 14.7 (58.4) |
| Mean daily minimum °C (°F) | 1.9 (35.4) | 4.0 (39.2) | 7.9 (46.2) | 12.2 (54.0) | 15.7 (60.3) | 18.5 (65.3) | 20.2 (68.4) | 19.6 (67.3) | 17.0 (62.6) | 13.0 (55.4) | 8.5 (47.3) | 3.3 (37.9) | 11.8 (53.3) |
| Record low °C (°F) | −7.8 (18.0) | −6.6 (20.1) | −3.5 (25.7) | 0.1 (32.2) | 6.3 (43.3) | 10.4 (50.7) | 12.1 (53.8) | 13.1 (55.6) | 8.1 (46.6) | 3.3 (37.9) | −2.4 (27.7) | −6.6 (20.1) | −7.8 (18.0) |
| Average precipitation mm (inches) | 26.5 (1.04) | 23.5 (0.93) | 46.8 (1.84) | 86.7 (3.41) | 184.6 (7.27) | 214.3 (8.44) | 171.9 (6.77) | 131.8 (5.19) | 89.4 (3.52) | 90.8 (3.57) | 38.3 (1.51) | 23.4 (0.92) | 1,128 (44.41) |
| Average precipitation days (≥ 0.1 mm) | 15.9 | 13.8 | 16.4 | 15.7 | 16.9 | 17.1 | 14.1 | 13.3 | 11.2 | 15.8 | 11.3 | 13.7 | 175.2 |
| Average snowy days | 5.1 | 2.4 | 0.5 | 0 | 0 | 0 | 0 | 0 | 0 | 0 | 0.1 | 2.3 | 10.4 |
| Average relative humidity (%) | 84 | 81 | 78 | 76 | 77 | 82 | 79 | 78 | 78 | 82 | 80 | 81 | 80 |
| Mean monthly sunshine hours | 34.8 | 52.9 | 74.0 | 97.4 | 104.4 | 74.4 | 132.3 | 143.4 | 110.4 | 72.6 | 73.9 | 50.2 | 1,020.7 |
| Percentage possible sunshine | 11 | 17 | 20 | 25 | 25 | 18 | 31 | 36 | 30 | 21 | 23 | 16 | 23 |
Source: China Meteorological Administration

== Administrative divisions ==
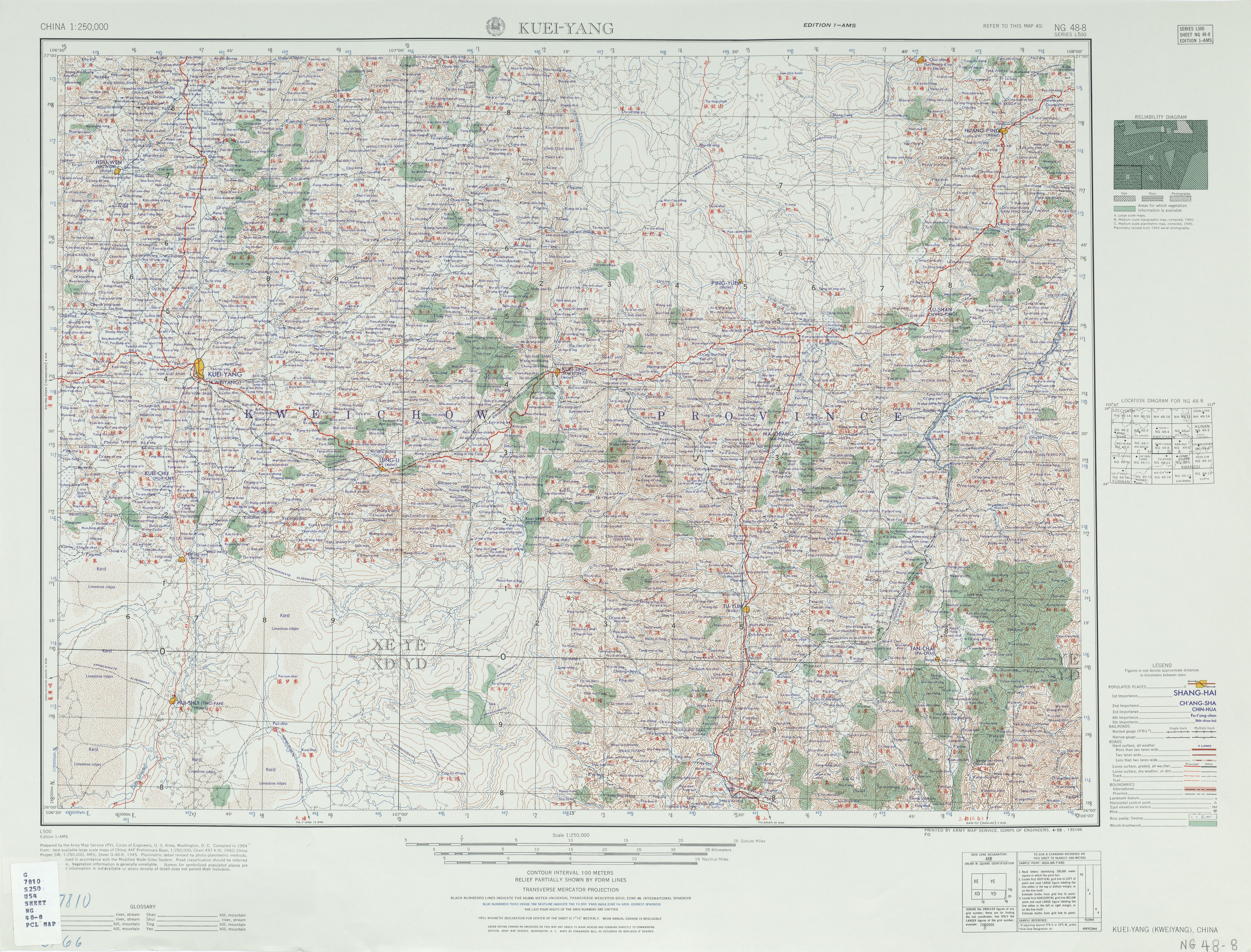
Map including Guiyang (labeled as 貴陽 KUEI-YANG (KWEIYANG) (Walled)) (AMS, 1954)

The entire Guiyang municipality currently consists of six districts, one county-level city and three counties. The districts are Nanming, Yunyan, Huaxi, Wudang, Baiyun and Guanshanhu. The county-city is Qingzhen and the counties are Kaiyang, Xifeng and Xiuwen. The Gui'an New District, a non-administrative economic project, is situated to the southwest of Guiyang. It crosses over into areas under the jurisdiction of the neighboring city of Anshun.

Map
| Division code | English | Chinese | Pinyin | Area in km2 | Seat | Postal code | Subdivisions | | | | | |
| Division code | English | Chinese | Pinyin | Area in km2 | Seat | Postal code | Subdistricts | Towns | Townships | Ethnic townships | Residential communities | Villages |
|---|---|---|---|---|---|---|---|---|---|---|---|---|
| 520100 | Guiyang | 贵阳市 | Guìyáng Shì | 8034 | Guanshanhu District | 550000 | 49 | 29 | 48 | 18 | 460 | 1166 |
| 520102 | Nanming District | 南明区 | Nánmíng Qū | 209 | Xinhua Road Subdistrict (新华路街道) | 550000 | 15 | | 4 | 1 | 139 | 29 |
| 520103 | Yunyan District | 云岩区 | Yúnyán Qū | 94 | Guiwu Road Subdistrict (贵乌路街道) | 550000 | 18 | 1 | | | 134 | 19 |
| 520111 | Huaxi District | 花溪区 | Huāxī Qū | 958 | Guizhu Subdistrict (贵筑街道) | 550000 | 8 | 2 | 9 | 5 | 42 | 170 |
| 520112 | Wudang District | 乌当区 | Wūdāng Qū | 686 | Xintian Subdistrict (新天街道) | 550000 | 2 | 3 | 5 | 2 | 19 | 74 |
| 520113 | Baiyun District | 白云区 | Báiyún Qū | 260 | Dashandong Subdistrict (大山洞街道) | 550000 | 4 | 3 | 2 | 2 | 31 | 56 |
| 520115 | Guanshanhu District | 观山湖区 | Guānshānhú Qū | 307 | Jinyang Subdistrict (金阳街道) | 550000 | 1 | 2 | 1 | | 16 | 33 |
| 520121 | Kaiyang County | 开阳县 | Kāiyáng Xiàn | 2026 | Chengguan (城关镇) | 550300 | | 6 | 10 | 3 | 13 | 108 |
| 520122 | Xifeng County | 息烽县 | Xīfēng Xiàn | 1037 | Yongjing (永靖镇) | 551100 | | 4 | 6 | 1 | 13 | 161 |
| 520123 | Xiuwen County | 修文县 | Xiūwén Xiàn | 1076 | Longchang (龙场镇) | 550200 | | 4 | 6 | 1 | 12 | 217 |
| 520181 | Qingzhen | 清镇市 | Qīngzhèn Shì | 1381 | Hongfenghu (红枫湖镇) | 551400 | 1 | 4 | 5 | 3 | 41 | 299 |

== Economy ==
Guiyang is the economic and commercial hub of Guizhou Province. In 2017, GDP for the Guiyang region totaled 353.8 billion yuan, with per capita GDP of 74,493 yuan ($10,720); the local economy is growing at the approximate pace of 10% per year. The city is also a large center for retail and wholesale commercial activities with operations of major domestic and international general retailers such as Wal-Mart, Carrefour, RT-Mart, Beijing Hualian, Parkson, and Xingli Group (星力集团) as well as consumer electronics and appliance sellers Gome and Suning. Wholesale operations include large regional produce, furniture, and industrial and construction machinery depots. Wal-Mart's southwest China regional vegetable and produce distribution center is located in Guiyang. Foreign brands have penetrated Guiyang rapidly, including McDonald's, Burger King, H&M, and Starbucks. Most of the time, they are located near the various shopping centers. The largest shopping centers are Hunter city plaza (亨特城市广场), Huaguoyuan Shopping Center (花果园购物中心), and Nanguohuajing (南国花锦). Hydro-electric power generators are located along the city's main rivers including the Wu River. By 2007, the city's hydro electric plants supplied over 70% of the city's electricity. Coal is mined in the locality of Guiyang and Anshun, and there are large thermal generating plants at Guiyang and Duyun, supplying electricity for a portion of the city's industry. A large iron and steel plant came into production in Guiyang in 1960, supplying the local machinery-manufacturing industry. Guiyang has a sizable domestic pharmaceuticals industry, producing traditional Chinese as well as Western medicines. Guiyang has also completed the first stage of city-wide free WiFi. The free Wifi project, D-Guiyang, is a joint venture of the city government and technology companies including Alibaba and Foxconn.

In 2016, Guiyang was named as the Best-Performing City in China by the Milken Institute owing to the city's "growth in jobs, wages, gross domestic product (GDP)." Guizhou Province saw the third-fastest growth among China's 31 regional districts in the first half of the year, growing by 10.5%. This growth is attributed to Guiyang's investments in computing and big data. Due to tax incentives and state support, multinational corporations such as Foxconn, Microsoft, Huawei, Hyundai Motor, Tencent, Qualcomm and Alibaba have opened offices in Guiyang.

== Demographics ==
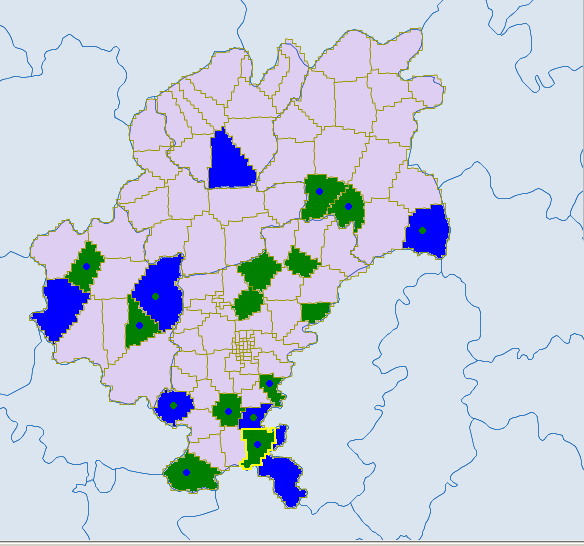
Blue areas represent significant Miao population while dark green represents Bouyei

Guiyang is populated by 49 different minorities, the most populous of which is the Miao people and ethnic Han.

According to the Seventh National Census in 2020, the city's Permanent Population (hukou) was 5,987,018. Compared with the Sixth National Census, the ten-year decrease was 1,664,407, a decrease of 38.5%. Among the permanent residents of the city, 4,794,071 people live in cities and towns, accounting for 80.07%; The rural population was 1,192,947, or 19.93%. Compared with the Sixth national census in 2010, the urban population increased by 1,861,786, the rural population decreased by 197,379, and the proportion of urban population increased by 12.23 percentage points.

As of 2011, the total population of Guiyang municipality was 4.3 million, among which 2.9 million were urban residents.

== Culture ==
=== Language ===
Besides ethnic minority languages such as Miao and Bouyei, the people of Guiyang speak a variety of Southwestern Mandarin. It differs from common Mandarin for the retroflex sounds it lacks. Compared to Mandarin which has five tones (four and a non-stressed tone), Guiyang's local language only has three tones. Many old characters from ancient China are still used within Guiyang's language, which sound like Korean or Japanese. For example, "去" (to go) is pronounced as "kèi", fourth tone, instead of the Mandarin pronunciation "qù" and 做 (to do) is pronounced as "zo", fourth tone, rather than the Mandarin pronunciation "zuo".

=== Cuisine ===
Provinces in China are known for the different specialities they offer, and Guiyang is most known for its spicy food as well as the following dishes:

- Gaoba porridge (糕粑稀饭; Gāobāxīfàn), a sweet dessert.
- Fish in sour soup (酸汤鱼; Suāntāngyú), a Miao dish with roasted fish and various vegetables.
- Huangba (黄粑; Huángbā), a sweet wrap made of rice that can be steamed or fried
- Huaxi Vermicelli (花溪牛肉粉; Huāxī Niúròufěn), a dish that consists of beef vermicelli, that is frequently eaten as a breakfast in Guiyang.
- Siwawa (丝娃娃; Sīwáwa), a dish that can be vegetarian or a mix of pork scraps and vegetables, where the ingredients are enclosed in rice wraps.
- Ice jelly with sesame seeds and peanuts (冰粉; Bīngfěn), usually eaten in summer, with siwawa or barbecue
- Chang-Wang noodles (肠旺面; Chángwàngmiàn), made up with pig's intestines and pig's blood.
- Qingyan's pig's feet (青岩猪脚; Qīngyán Zhūjiǎo), mostly found in the old town of Qingyan, pig's feet symbolize good luck.
- Potato cake (洋芋粑; Yángyù bā): Mashed potatoes fried into pancakes, seasoned with chili powder, a common street snack.
- Beef in Sour Soup (酸汤牛肉; Suāntāng niúròu): Sour soup is not only used to cook fish, but is also often stewed with beef, which is appetizing and refreshing.

Since the mid-2000s, Guiyang has developed a coffee culture, with as of 2025 over 3,000 coffee shops in the city, the highest density among cities in China.

=== Tourism ===
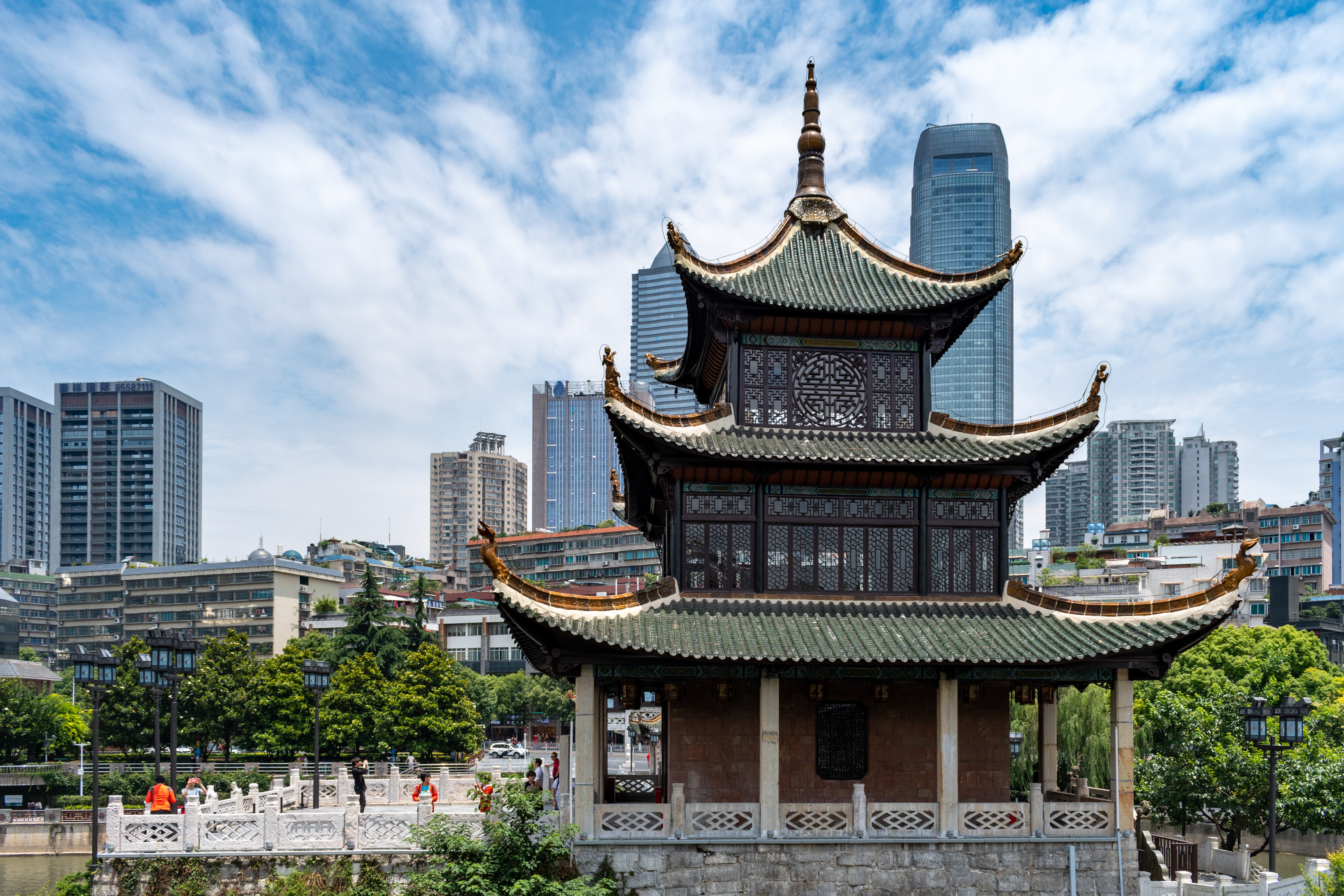
Jiaxiu Pavilion in 2023

Being the capital of Guizhou, a very old and traditional province of China, Guiyang is shaped by its history, and still possesses many historical sites that attract many tourists:

- The Jiaxiu Pavilion (甲秀楼; Jiǎxiù Lóu): The Jiaxiu Pavilion is located in the southern tip of the Guiyang Nanming River, which is the city's emblem and its symbol. It was initially built in 1598 during the Ming Dynasty and was destroyed multiple times in history. It was being rebuilt most recently in 1982.
- Qingyan Ancient Town (青岩古镇; Qīyán Gǔzhèn): Qingyan Ancient Town is located in the southern tip of Guiyang. It was originally built in the year 1378, during the Ming Dynasty. It is known its beautiful Chinese ancient architecture.

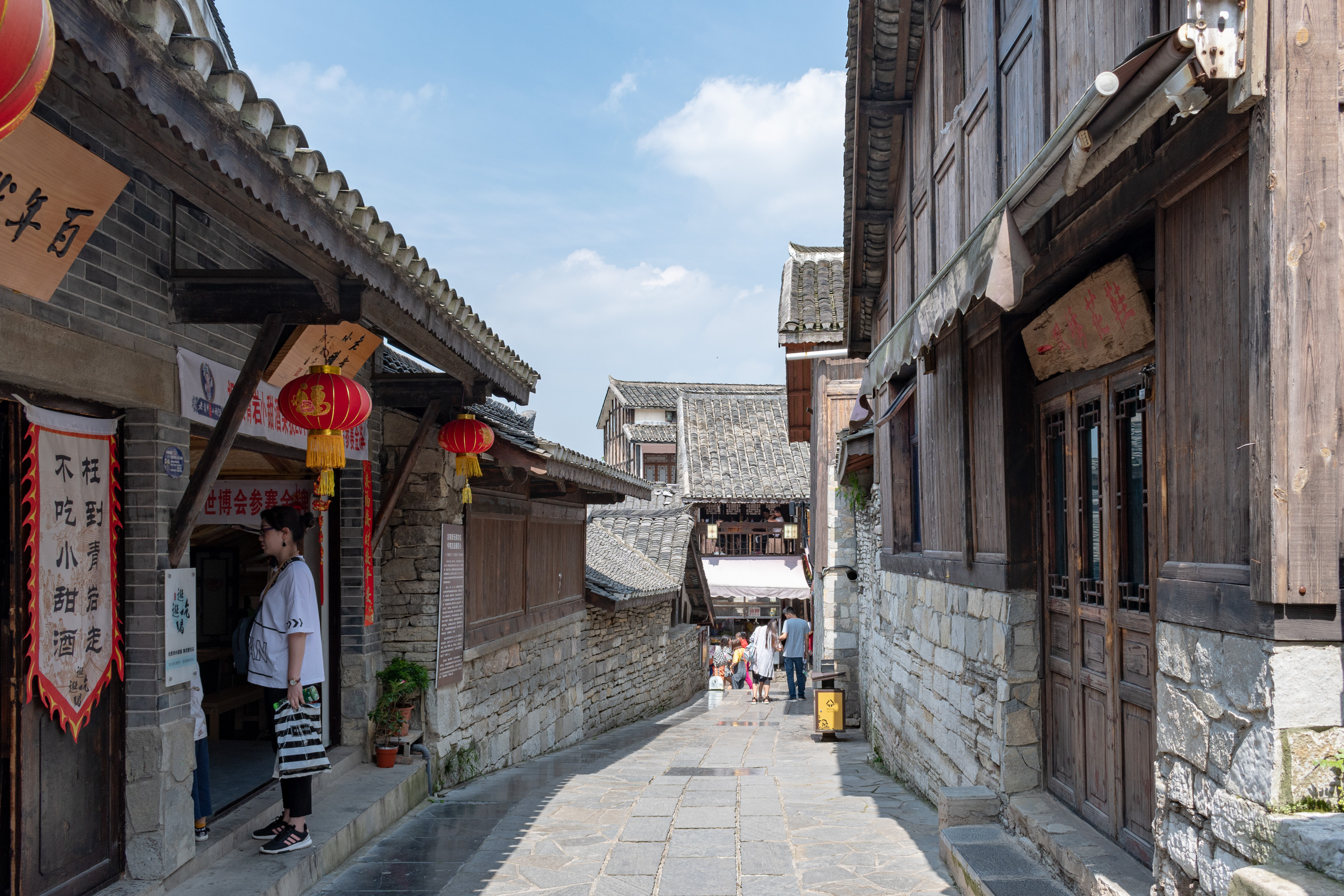
Qingyan Ancient Town

- Xifeng Concentration Camp (息烽集中营; Xīfēng Jízhōngyín): Xifeng Concentration Camp was the largest, highest-level prison of all the prisons set up by the Military commission of the KMT government during the Second Sino-Japanese War in 1937, and it was added by the state council to the list of major historical and cultural sites under state protection, in 1988.
- Confucian Center (孔学堂; Kǒngxuétáng): the Confucian center is a non-public and educational organization affiliated with the Ministry of Education of the People's Republic of China. The Confucius Institute promotes and teaches Chinese culture and language around the world. The Confucian Temple, in the center of Qufu city, was built in 478 BC.
- Xifeng Hot Spring (息烽温泉; Xīfēng Wēnquán): Xifeng Hot Spring is located in the northeast of Xifeng County. The hot spring is surrounded by many mountains, upon which rich slopes grow a profusion of pines, firs, bamboos and other plants. This beautiful place has offered its advantages for sanatoriums, hospitals and villas.
- Qianling Park (黔灵公园; Qiánlíng Gōngyuán): Qianling Park, in the northwest part of Guiyang, takes its name from Mount Qianling, which is known as southern Guizhou's most majestic mountain. The park is covered with thick vegetation and old trees, with more than 1,500 types of flowers and trees, and at least 1,000 types of Medicinal herbs. The Hongfu Temple, built toward the end of the Ming dynasty and the beginning of the Qing Dynasty, is one of Guizhou's most famous temples.
- Huaxi National Wetland Park (花溪湿地公园; Huāxī Shīdì Gōngyuán): Guiyang Huaxi national urban wetland Park is located in the north of downtown Guiyang's Huaxi district. It is one of the only urban Wetlands in the country. On the environmental aspect, it belongs to a subtropical humid climate of the plateau karst hilly region, based on Karst landform characteristics of the urban wetland park, its unique geographical location and geological structure form a rich variety of landscapes resources.

=== Nightlife ===
- Pubs and bars

The most dynamic street in Guiyang is Qianling East Road (黔灵东路), unironically called "Drinking Street" for the diversity and great number of pubs and bars that occupy it. In the province where Moutai comes from, a well-known liquor in China, drinking tends to be a tradition. In Guiyang, beers are poured in small cups, and games with dice or cards are often played while drinking.

- Night markets

When the night comes, street food flourishes everywhere in Guiyang. On Shaanxi Road (陕西路), one can find mutton chops, baked snails, and roast chicken. On Bo'ai Road (博爱路) you can find mutton patties, glutinous rice, rice noodles, and a combination of western and eastern foods.

- Night gaming traditions

At night, older people usually prefer to indulge in outdoor games, such as Mahjong or square dancing.

== Transport ==
Transportation in Guiyang consists of an extensive network of roads, railways, river and air transport as well as public transportation system with bus system and many taxis.

=== Air ===
Guiyang is one of the important air transport hubs in Southwest China. Guiyang's main airport is the Guiyang Longdongbao International Airport (KWE) opened on May 28, 1997. It is located in east of Guiyang, 11 km (6.8 mi) away from the city center. In 2017, the airport handled over 18 million passengers; this is a three-fold increase in passenger traffic from 2010.

=== Metro ===
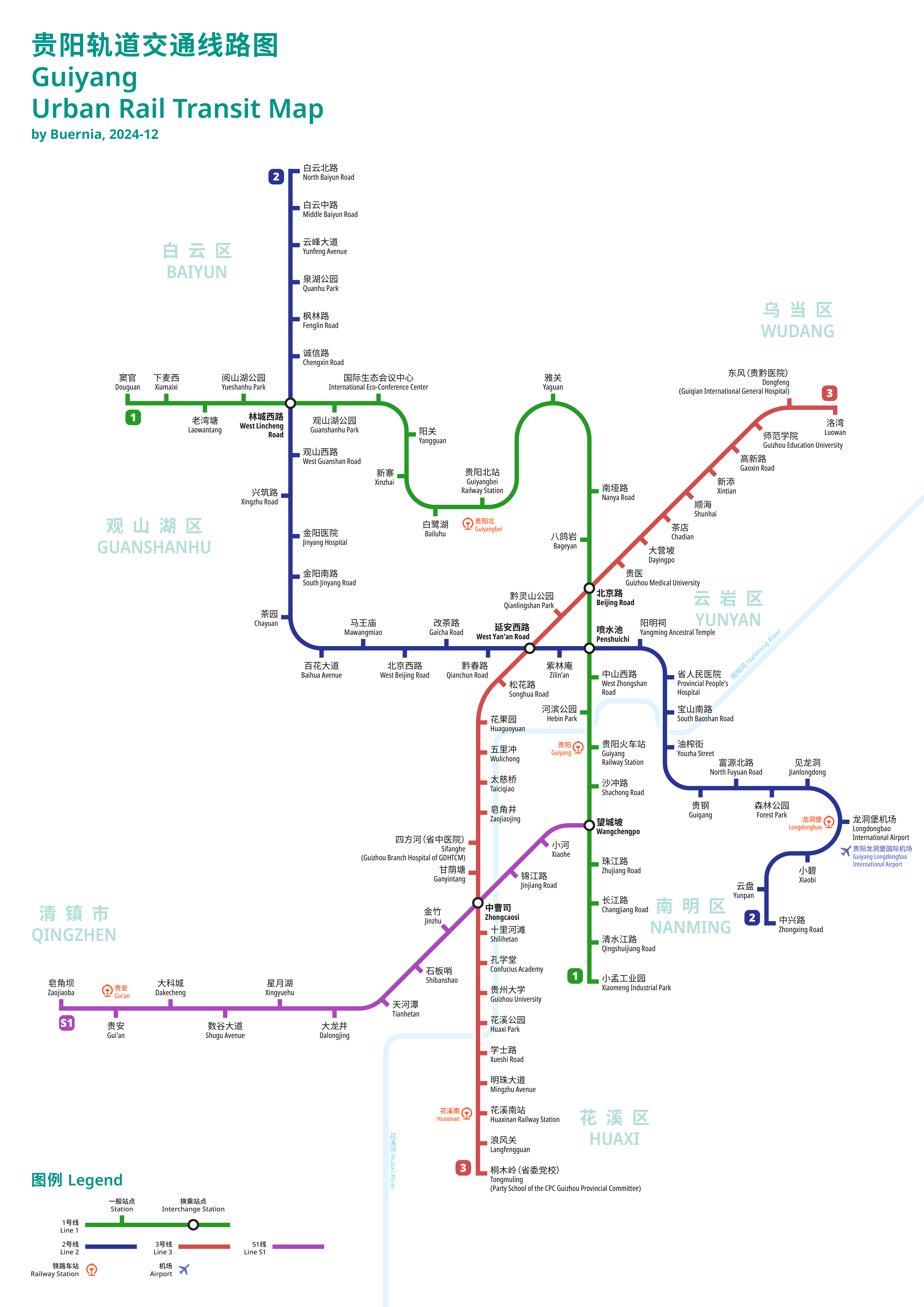
Guiyang Metro Map.

Guiyang Metro began construction in 2011. Line 1 began operation in December 2017. Line 2 began operation in April 2021. Line 3 began operation in December 2023.

=== Railway ===
Guiyang is a railway hub in southwest China. The Guizhou–Guangxi Railway (built in 1959, modified 2009), the Sichuan–Guizhou Railway (completed 1965), the Guiyang–Kunming Railway (completed 1970), and the Hunan–Guizhou Railway (completed 1975) intersect at Guiyang Railway Station. This main southern railway station was rebuilt in 2008.

Since 2008, the city has seen rapid development of high-speed rail. The Guiyang–Guangzhou High-Speed Railway, Shanghai–Kunming high-speed railway and Chongqing–Guiyang high-speed railway began operations in quick succession. The explosion of high-speed rail development has dramatically decreased travel times to nearly all first-tier Chinese cities, including Beijing (8 hours), Shanghai (9 hours), Guangzhou (4.5 hours), Chengdu (4 hours) and Chongqing (~2 hours). The high speed railway lines provide rapid freight service from two rail yards, and passenger service from Guiyang North railway station, in the city's Guanshanhu District.

=== Expressway ===
The city is located at the junction of four major segments of the national highway grid: the Gui–Huang, Gui–Zun, Gui–Bi, and Gui–Xin Expressways. The Gui-Huang Expressway (G60) links Guiyang with the cities and tourist areas of central and western Guizhou including Anshun, Guanling, and the Huangguoshu Waterfall. The expressway continues west to Yunnan Province as the Gui-Kun Expressway and terminates at Yunnan's capital city of Kunming. G75 Lanzhou–Haikou Expressway runs north 180 km (110 mi) to Zunyi and is the most heavily travelled major highway in Guiyang. In Zunyi, the expressway becomes the Zunyi-Chongqing Expressway and runs a further 210 km (130 mi) north to Chongqing. G76 Xiamen–Chengdu Expressway links Guiyang with the regional cities of Bijie and Dafang in northwest Guizhou province, southeastern Sichuan province, and the Sichuan cities of Luzhou, Neijiang, and Chengdu—Sichuan's provincial capital. The Gui–Bi Expressway begins at an interchange with the Gui–Zun Expressway in the city's Xiuwen County approximately 20 km (12 mi) north of the city center, before terminating at the city of Bijie. In the city of Dafang, approximately 40 km (25 mi) east of Bijie, the Gui–Bi Expressway connects with the new Sichuan–Guizhou Expressway, a modern highway providing access to Luzhou and central Sichuan. The Gui–Xin Expressway begins at the junction of the Guiyang Outer Ring Road (G75, G60.01) and the Tang Ba Guan Road, approximately 5 km (3.1 mi) southeast of the city center. The Gui–Xin Expressway (G60, G75) runs east and southeast through the Guangxi Zhuang Autonomous Region (G76), passing through Guilin, before entering Guangdong, and terminating at Guangzhou. Approximately 170 km (110 mi) east of Guiyang in the regional city of Kaili, the Hunan-Guizhou Expressway (G56, G60) links with the Gui–Xin Expressway providing high-speed vehicular access to and from Guiyang to the eastern Guizhou city of Tongren before continuing through Hunan to the major cities of Huaihua, Changde, and Changsha. The China National Highway 210 also runs through Guiyang via Xifeng and Longli.

In 2009 Guiyang added a modern orbital expressway to its highway network. The Guiyang Outer Ring Road (Guiyang Orbital Highway) opened in December 2009 and is a six- to eight-lane divided high-speed expressway that provides efficient links to and from large employment centers in the Jinyang New District, Baiyun District, Huaxi District, the Guiyang Longdongbao International Airport, the major multi-lane national highways, and the city's main roadways, allowing vehicular traffic to circumnavigate the heavy traffic of the city's inner city areas.

Transportation infrastructure of Guiyang
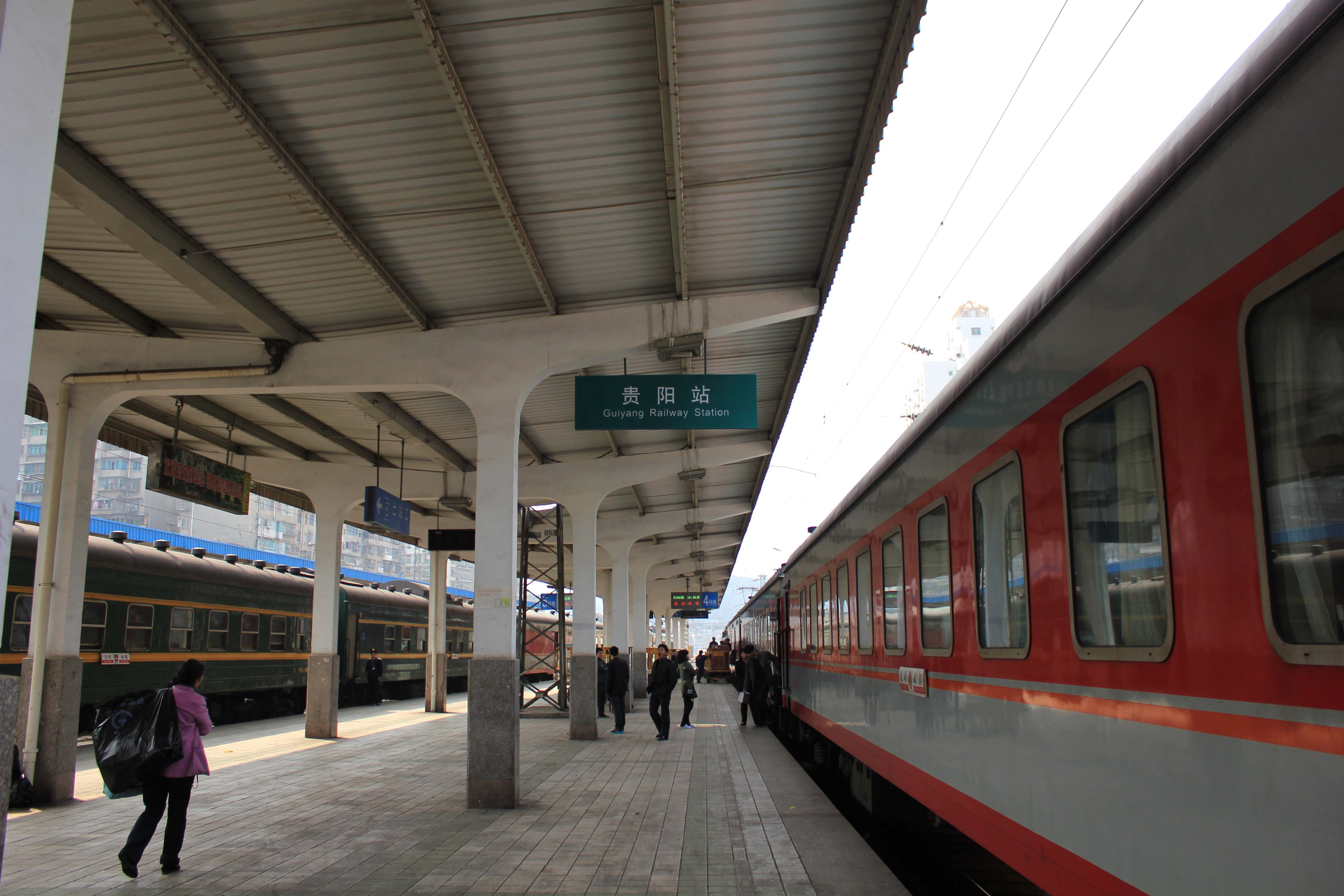
Platform 4 in Guiyang railway station

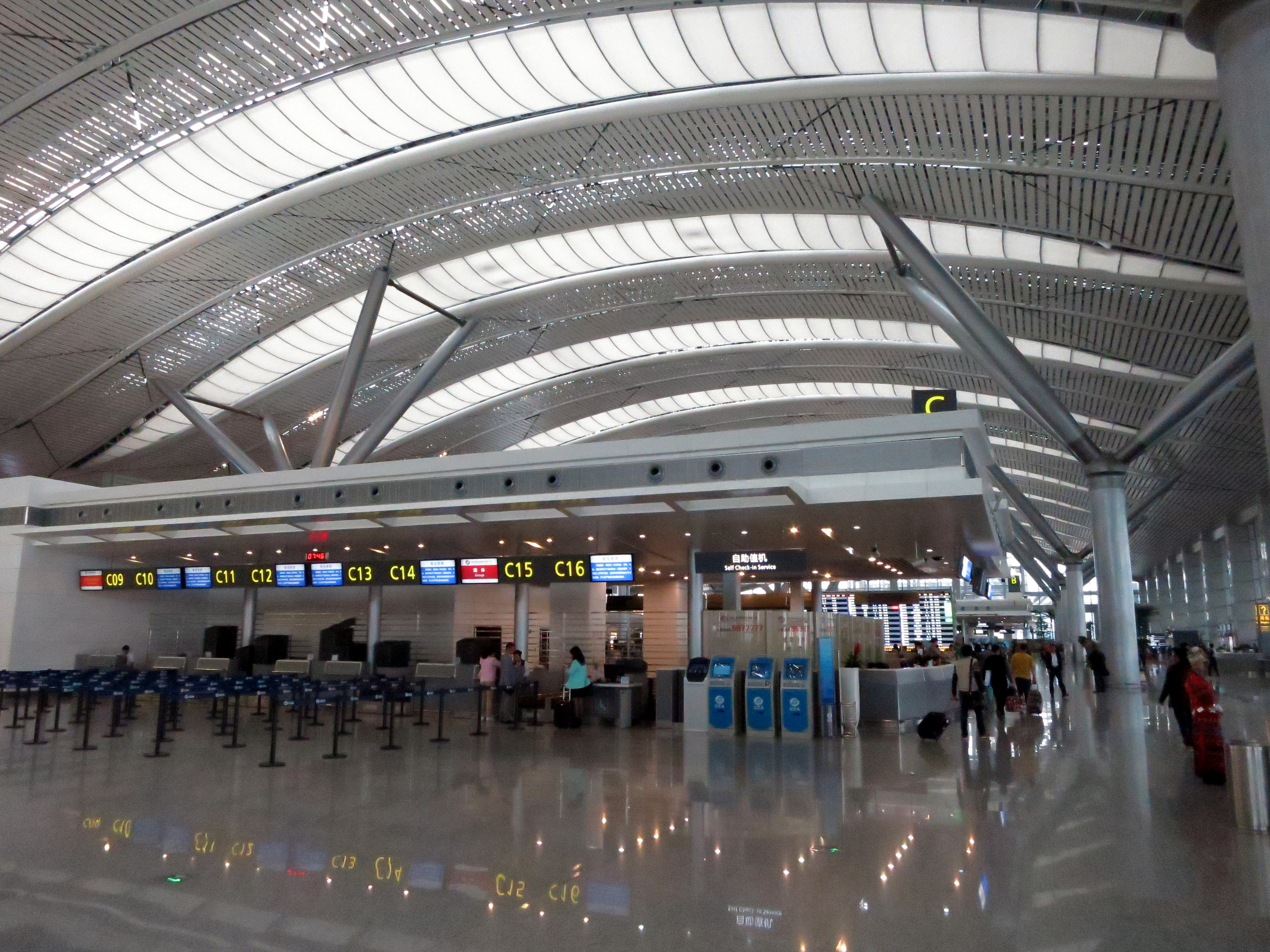
Interior of Guiyang Longdongbao International Airport

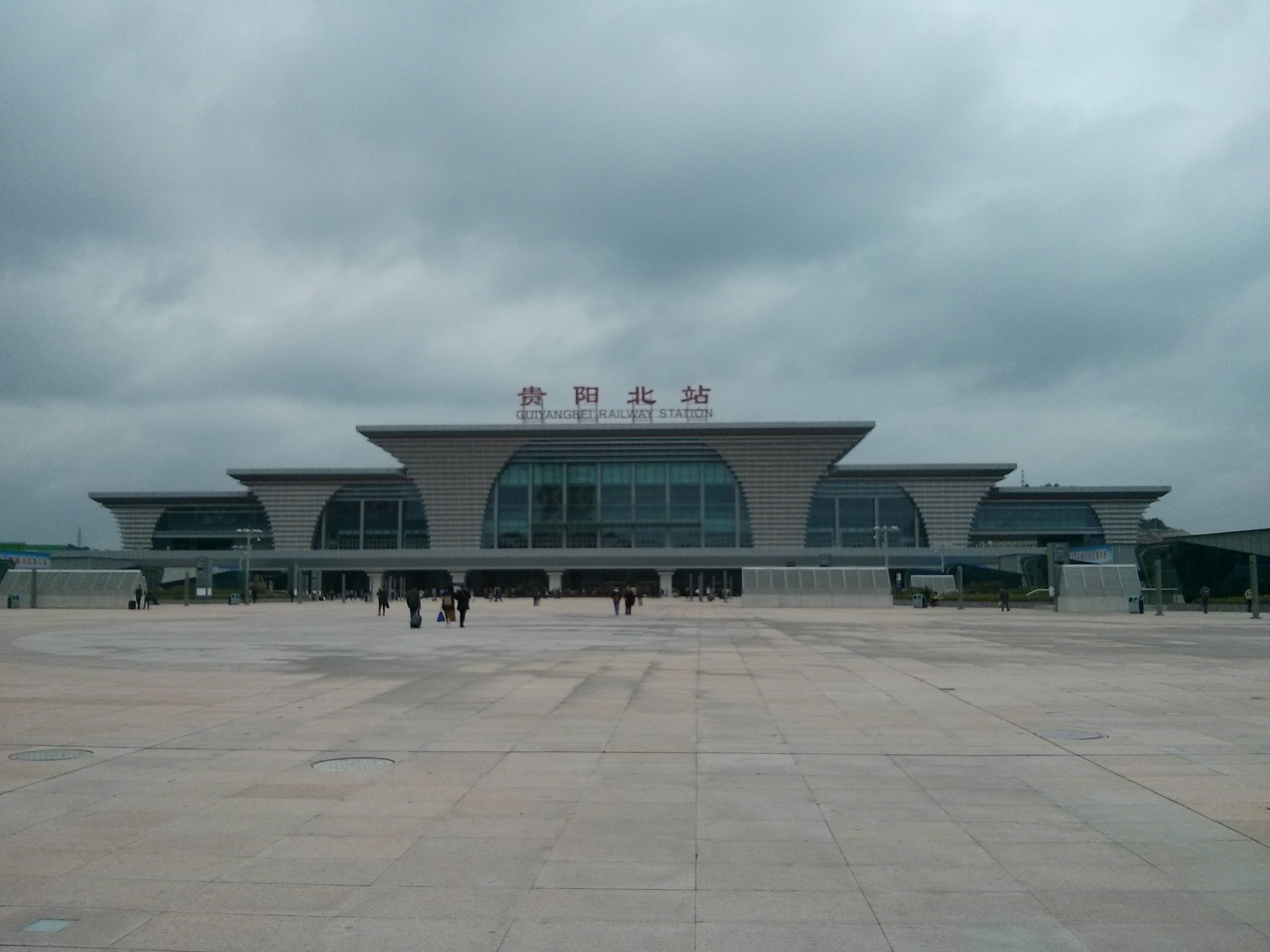
Guiyang North railway station

== Education ==
The city has a university, a teacher-training college, a medical school, and 224 primary and middle schools. As of 2025, Guiyang is ranked one of the top 150 science cities in the world by scientific research outputs, as tracked by the Nature Index. The city is also home to Guizhou University, a national research university under the Project 211 and under the Double First-Class Construction in certain disciplines.

- Guizhou University
- Guizhou Normal University
- Guizhou Medical University
- Guizhou University of Finance and Economics
- Guizhou Nationalities University
- Guizhou Institute of Technology
- Guiyang College
- Guiyang College of Traditional Chinese Medicine
- Commercial College of Guizhou

== Religion ==
Qianming Temple was first established in the 17th century, in the late Ming Dynasty and is located in Nanming District of Guiyang.

On October 15, 1696, the city was made the seat of the Roman Catholic Apostolic Vicariate of Kweichow. This was suppressed in 1715 and restored in 1846. In 1924 it was renamed as the Apostolic Vicariate of Guiyang, and in 1946 it was promoted to its current status as the Roman Catholic Archdiocese of Guiyang.

== Gallery ==
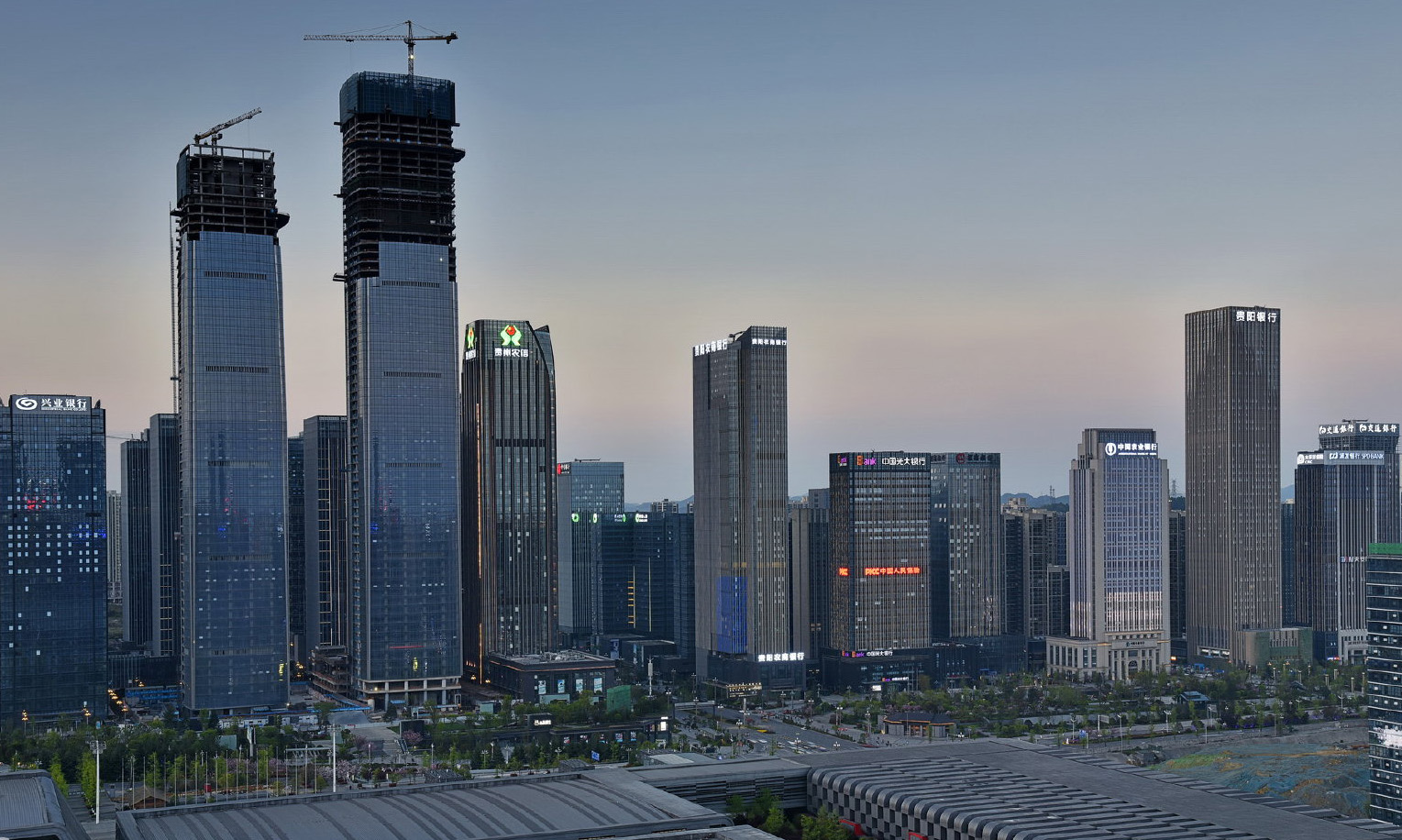
Guizhou Financial City District

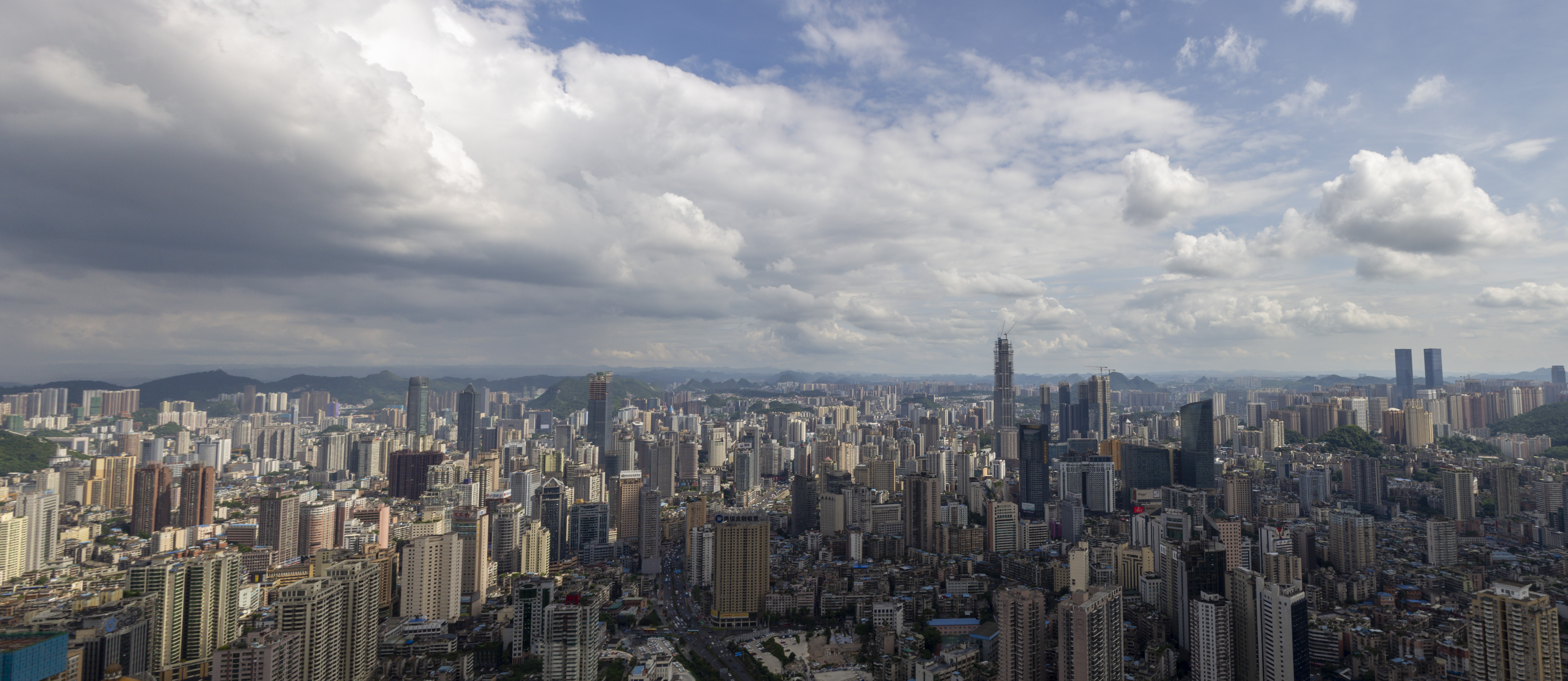
Nanming district

== See also ==
- List of twin towns and sister cities in China
- Guiyang biota
