= Zunyi Medical University =

University in Zunyi, China

Coordinates: 27.724327°N 107.0664°E

- 遵义医学院
- Former name: Dalian Medical College
- Motto in English: Be Virtue-conscious, Be Diligent, Be Truth-seeking and Be Practical.
- Type: Public
- Established: 1947
- President: Jingshan Shi
- Vice-president: Tian Yu
- Location: Zunyi, Guizhou and Zhuhai, Guangdong, China
- Website: www.zmu.edu.cn (Zunyi Campus) www.zmu.gd.cn (Zhuhai Campus)

Zunyi Medical University (Chinese: 遵义医学院; pinyin: Zūn yì yī xué yuàn) is a medical university in Zunyi, Guizhou province of the People's Republic of China.

== History ==
The college was founded in 1947 as the Dalian Medical College. The college was relocated from Dalian to Zunyi and renamed Zunyi Medical University in 1969.
