= Wu Qiang (officeholder) =

Chinese politician

- 吴强

Communist Party Secretary of Bijie City
- Incumbent
- Assumed office August 2021
- Preceded by: Zhou Jiankun

Personal details
- Born: August 1966 (age 60) Xinhuang Dong Autonomous County, Hunan, China
- Party: Chinese Communist Party
- Education: Nanjing University (BS); Tianjin University (MEng)

Chinese name
- Simplified Chinese: 吴强
- Traditional Chinese: 吳強
Transcriptions
Standard Mandarin
- Hanyu Pinyin: Wu Qiang

Wu Qiang (Chinese: 吴强; born August 1966) is a Chinese official currently serving as the Chinese Communist Party Committee Secretary of Bijie, Guizhou and secretary general of the CCP Guizhou Provincial Committee.

He is an alternate of the 19th Central Committee of the Chinese Communist Party.

== Biography ==
Wu was born in Xinhuang Dong Autonomous County, Hunan, in August 1966.

Wu Qiang received a Bachelor of Science with a major in economic geography (urban planning) from Nanjing University in 1988 and a Master of Engineering in architecture and civil engineering from Tianjin University in 2005.

Wu worked in government after university in August 1988. He joined the Chinese Communist Party (CCP) in November 1994. He worked at Guiyang Urban Planning Bureau before serving as deputy director of Guizhou Provincial Communications Department in February 2002.

In November 2011, he was transferred to Bijie and appointed vice mayor and deputy party branch secretary. He was also a member of the standing committee of the CCP Bijie Municipal Committee, the city's top authority. He became director of Guizhou Railway Construction Office and deputy secretary general of Guizhou Provincial Government in July 2012, and served until September 2016, when he was appointed director of Guizhou Provincial Economic and Information Technology Commission and secretary of National Defense Industry Working Committee of the CCP Guizhou Provincial Committee. In January 2018, he was promoted to vice governor of Guizhou, a post he kept until September 2020, when he became secretary general of the CCP Guizhou Provincial Committee and was admitted to member of the standing committee of the CCP Guizhou Provincial Committee, the province's top authority. He concurrently serving as party secretary of Bijie since August 2021.

Government offices
Preceded by Ma Ningyu	Director of Guizhou Provincial Economic and Information Technology Commission; 2016–2018	Succeeded by He Gang
Party political offices
Preceded by Liu Jie	Secretary General of the CPC Guizhou Provincial Committee; 2020–present	Incumbent
Preceded by Zhou Jiankun	Communist Party Secretary of Bijie; 2021–present	Incumbent
