= Guizhou University of Finance and Economics =

- 贵州财经大学
- Former names: Guizhou College of Finance and Economics
- Motto: 厚德 博学 笃行 鼎新
- Motto in English: Virtue, Erudition, Conscience, Innovation
- Type: Public university
- Established: 1958
- Vice-president: Yang Yong (杨勇)
- Party Secretary: Chu Guangrong (褚光荣)
- Academic staff: 1,895
- Undergraduates: 20,000
- Postgraduates: 1,603
- Location: Guiyang, Guizhou, China
- Campus: Urban area: 1040.65 MU 69.3 Hectares
- Colours: Dark Red; White; Brown
- Website: www.gufe.edu.cn

Guizhou University of Finance and Economics (GUFE; Chinese: 贵州财经大学; pinyin: Guìzhōu Cáijīng Dàxué), colloquially Gui Cai (贵财; pinyin: Guì Cái), is a provincial research university located in Guiyang, Guizhou with a focus on management, economics, and research on big data in finance. The university grants bachelor's, master's, and doctoral degrees through 17 academic departments and 62 undergraduate majors, and operates the Guiyang Institute for Big Data and Finance. Its honorary president is Professor Hong Yinxing, former Party Secretary of Nanjing University.

With a modern campus in the Huaxi University City district, Gui Cai enrolls nearly 20,000 undergraduate students, including 300 students through its Western Michigan Institute (西密歇根学院; pinyin: Xī Mìxiēgēn Xuéyuàn), an undergraduate college jointly established with Western Michigan University in Michigan, United States and the second Chinese-American education partnership in Guizhou.

The university's strategic development plan for 2015-2020 focuses primarily on increasing the quality of undergraduate teaching and curricula. Other major goals include hiring a "first-class" faculty, raising research standards and quality, and developing more international partnerships.

== History ==
The university was established on August 21, 1958 by combining three provincial schools which trained party cadres in economics, management, marketing, supply chain management, and other necessary skills for government service. The new institution was named the Guizhou College of Finance and Economics (贵州财经学) and was based in the Hebin District of Guiyang, where the university continues to maintain a campus.

During the Cultural Revolution, the institution was forced to suspend operations. It was re-established in 1978 and admitted its first class of undergraduate students that year.

In 1992, the College absorbed the provincial party cadre training school for economic planning.

In 2002, the institution relocated most of its facilities from its Hebin campus to a new campus in Luchongguan District, and granted its first master's degree in 2004.

On June 15, 2012, after approval from the Ministry of Education, the institution held a ceremony and changed its name to the Guizhou University of Finance and Economics.

In 2013, the university began moving facilities and students to a state-of-the-art campus in Huaxi University City, a new district in Guiyang that had begun construction in 2011.

The university began to pursue more international partnerships in 2012 with the establishment of a joint undergraduate finance program with the Edinburgh Napier University, a public university in the United Kingdom. In 2015, the university established its Western Michigan Institute, an undergraduate college in collaboration with Western Michigan University, a state university in Michigan, United States. Gui Cai also maintains programs in accounting, financial insurance, marketing, and logistics management policy jointly organized with Berkeley College, a for-profit college in New Jersey, United States.

In 2018, the university was authorized to grant its first doctoral degrees.

== Campuses ==
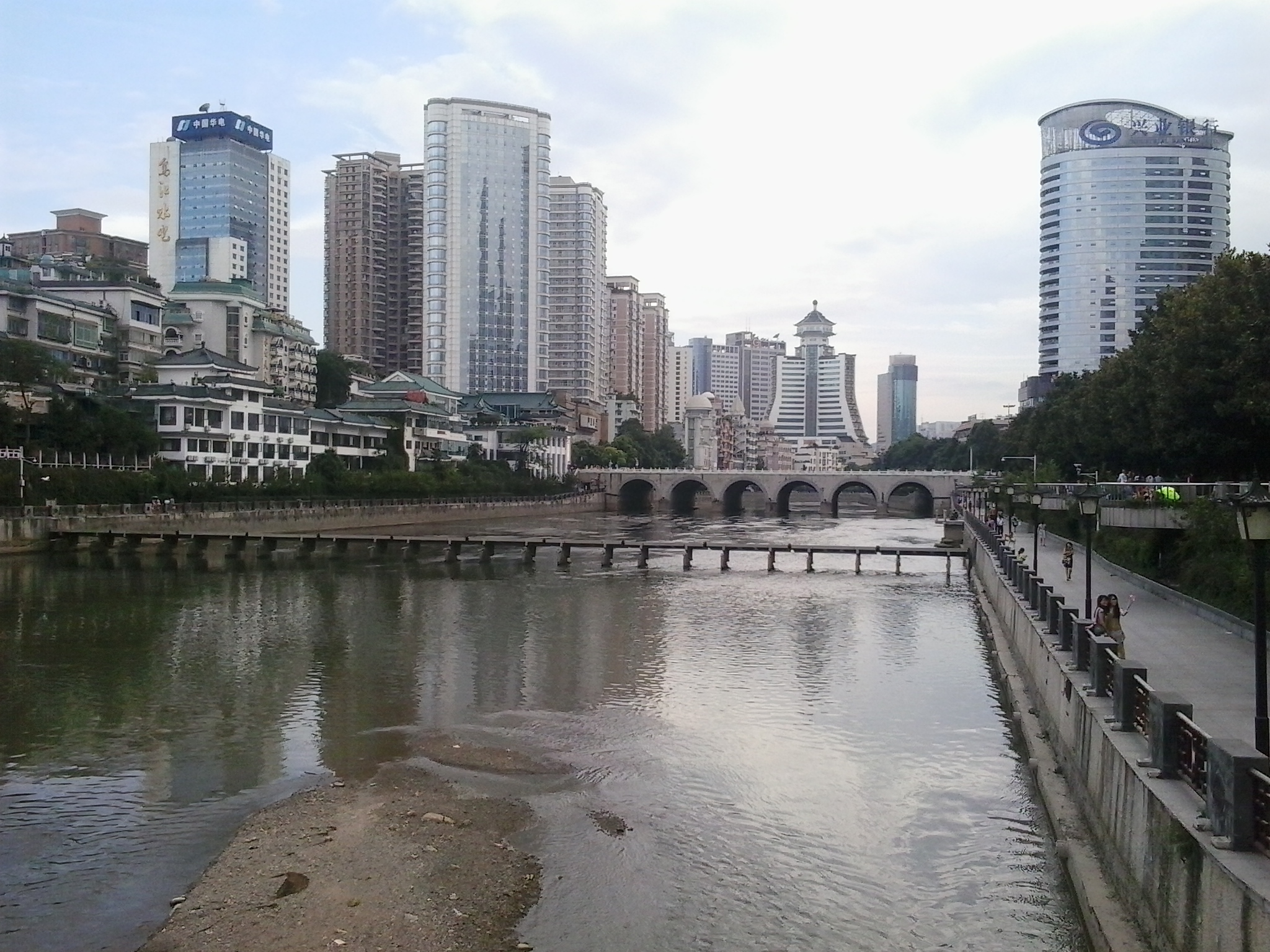
View of a riverwalk in downtown Guiyang, Guizhou

Guizhou University of Finance and Economics operates three campuses across Guiyang, Guizhou.

=== Huaxi University City ===
Gui Cai is headquartered in Huaxi University City, at its modern campus constructed in 2011. The campus spans 5,106.8 acres with building space totaling 1.06 million square meters. The university library system contains 2.21 million books, 1.59 million e-books, and 36,000 domestic and foreign academic journals.

=== Older campuses ===
The university continues to maintain its Luchongguan District campus, in operation since 2002, and the Hebin District campus, the original site of the three provincial party cadre schools which merged in 1958 to form the institution.

=== Confucius Institute in Eritrea ===
Since 2013, the university has been the host institution of the Confucius Institute at the Eritrean Commission on Higher Education in Eritrea. The institute is housed on the grounds of the former University of Asmara and collaborates with the nearby public colleges and primary and secondary schools. Faculty and staff from Gui Cai have traveled to Eritrea to conduct Chinese language classes and host Chinese cultural festivals, while Eritrean students learning Chinese traveled to China to study at Gui Cai. Additionally, staff and Eritrean students of the institute have translated Eritrean textbooks into Chinese and developed a localized curriculum for teaching Chinese.
