= Guizhou University =

Provincial public university in Guiyang, Guizhou, China

- 贵州大学
- Other names: 贵大; Guì Dà
- Motto: 明德至善，博学笃行
- Type: Public
- Established: 1902; 124 years ago
- President: Song Bao An
- Party Secretary: Yao Xiaoquan
- Academic staff: 4,163 (Jun 2022)
- Students: 47,944 (June 2022)
- Undergraduates: 34,437 (June 2022)
- Postgraduates: 13,507 (June 2022)
- Location: Guiyang, Guizhou, China; 26°25′21″N 106°40′09″E
- Campus: Urban, 362.22 ha (895.1 acres)
- Colours: Red
- Website: www.gzu.edu.cn

Chinese name
- Simplified Chinese: 贵州大学
- Traditional Chinese: 貴州大學
Transcriptions
Standard Mandarin
- Hanyu Pinyin: Guìzhōu Dàxué

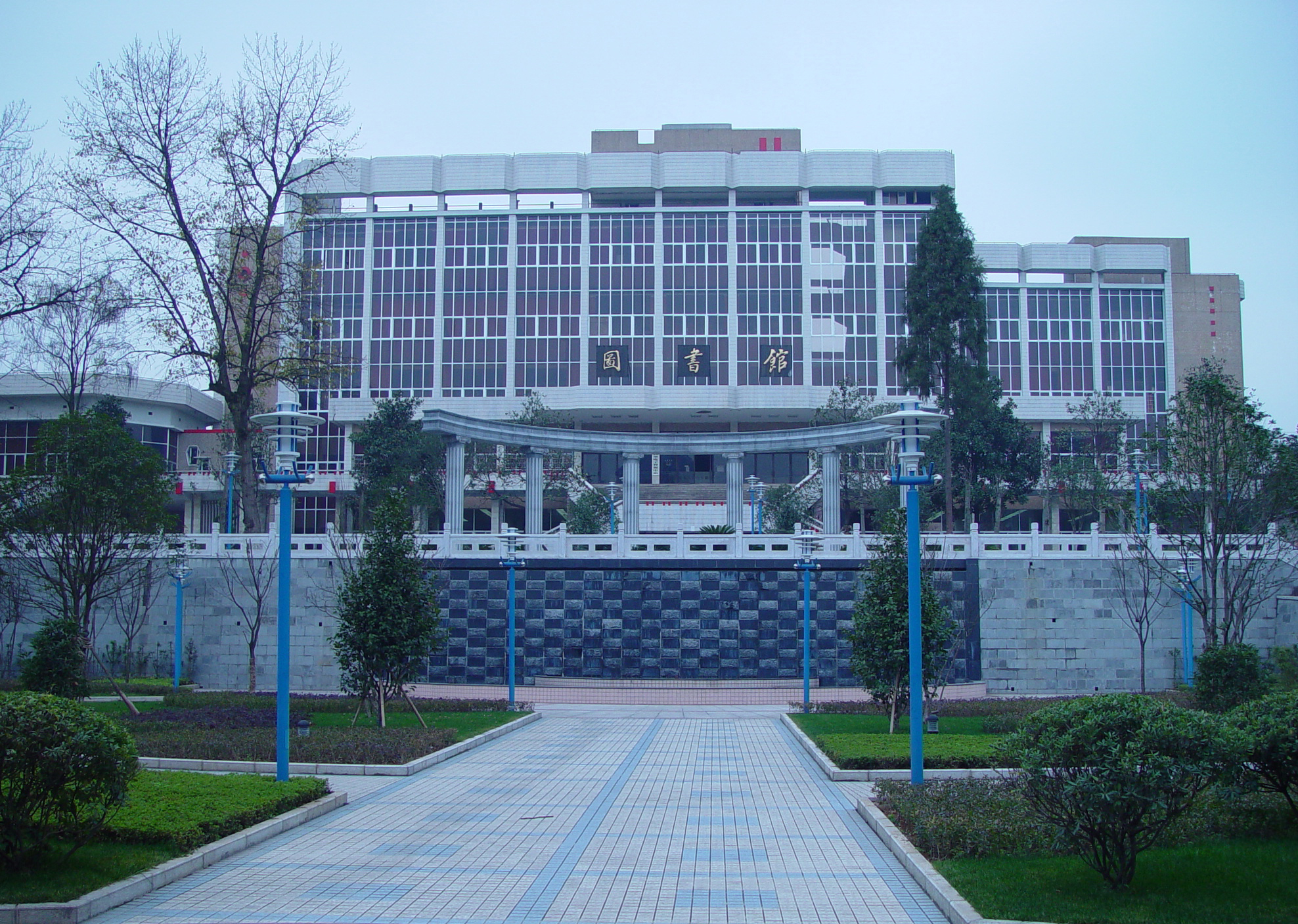
Library on the North Campus of Guizhou University

Guizhou University (贵州大学) is a provincial public university located in suburban Guiyang, Guizhou, China. It is affiliated with the Province of Guizhou and is co-funded by the Guizhou Provincial People's Government and the Ministry of Education. The university is part of Project 211 and the Double First-Class Construction.

Founded in 1902, it is the flagship institution of higher learning in Guizhou province. The university was a national key university in the "One Province, One School" project in the Midwest of China. With over 30,000 students, Guizhou University is one of the largest universities by enrollment in Southwestern China.

== History ==
The predecessor of the modern Guizhou University was known as the Guizhou Institute of Higher Learning (贵州大学堂), which was founded in 1902. The institute evolved into the Provincial Guizhou University (省立贵州大学), National Guizhou College of Agriculture and Engineering (国立贵州农工学院), and finally National Guizhou University (国立贵州大学).

In 1997, the Guizhou Agricultural College, Guizhou Institute of Arts, and Guizhou Agricultural Cadre-Training School were merged into NGU to form Guizhou University.

In 2004, the Guizhou University of Technology merged into Guizhou University to complete the current Guizhou University. In 2005, the university was invited as a member of Project 211 by the Ministry of Education.

The university is included in the Chinese state Double First Class University Plan.

Guizhou University established a sister school relationship with the Presbyterian College in Clinton, South Carolina; the latter offers a Chinese language program for the fifteen American students every year.

== Disciplines ==
The university consists of 39 colleges and offers programs of study in 11 academic divisions leading to associate, baccalaureate, master's, and doctoral degrees. These include:

- Agriculture
- Administration
- Economics
- Education
- Engineering
- History
- Law
- Liberal arts
- Medicine
- Philosophy
- Sciences

== Rankings ==
Guizhou University ranked the best in Guizhou Province by several major international university rankings. As of 2025, Guizhou University ranked 86th in China by the Academic Ranking of World Universities.

As of 2024, Guizhou University ranked 803th by SCImago Institutions Rankings among research universities around the world. The 2024 CWTS Leiden Ranking ranked Guizhou University at 379th in the world based on their publications for the period 2019–2022. The university was ranked 401-500th globally by the Academic Ranking of World Universities (ARWU). The Nature Index 2025 Annual Tables by Nature Research ranked Guizhou University at 252th among leading academic research institutions in the world for the high quality of research publications in natural science.

== International cooperation and Peace Corps involvement ==
In 1989 Guizhou Agricultural College, then a separate university, began hosting VSO teachers in the Foreign Language Department. The following year, Guizhou University began hosting foreign teachers from the AISH programme in Australia and visiting teacher programmes in both New Zealand and the University of Alabama. Simultaneously, VSO teachers from the UK and the Netherlands were recruited to work in other Guiyang institutes of higher education including the school of fashion and the catering college, both experiencing booms concurrent with Guiyang's emergence from relative obscurity. These teachers taught in both the undergraduate and post-graduate programmes at each institution.

In 2005, eight years after Gui Nong (Guizhou Agricultural College) was merged with Gui Da (Guizhou University), Guizhou University began hosting United States Peace Corps Volunteers. The volunteers teach at both the undergraduate and graduate level in the School of Foreign Languages.

To strengthen educational exchanges and bilateral ties between China and Gambia, Guizhou University in 2018 signed a memorandum of understanding with University of Gambia to establish a Confucius Institute at the University of Gambia.

== Campus ==
Guizhou University has three campuses situated in Huaxi District around the city of Guiyang. These campuses are respectively: East Campus: No. 2708, South Section of Huaxi Avenue, Huaxi District; South Campus: Xiahui Road, Huaxi District; West Campus: Jiaxiu South Road, Huaxi District. The administrative center is located on the West Campus on the Huaxi River, Huaxi District of Guiyang.

== See also ==
- List of universities in China

== Gallery ==
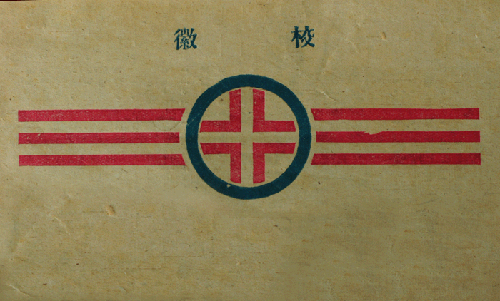
Emblem of the National Guizhou University (国立贵州大学), 1940s.

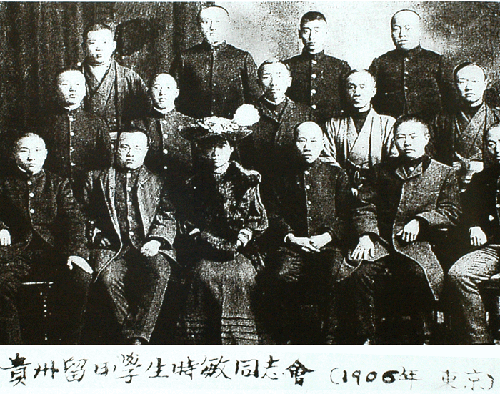
Guizhou Students in Tokyo, Japan in 1906. Mr. Zhang Xielu (first from left in the first row) was a student of Guizhou Institute of Higher Learning (贵州大学堂)-the predecessor of Guizhou University.

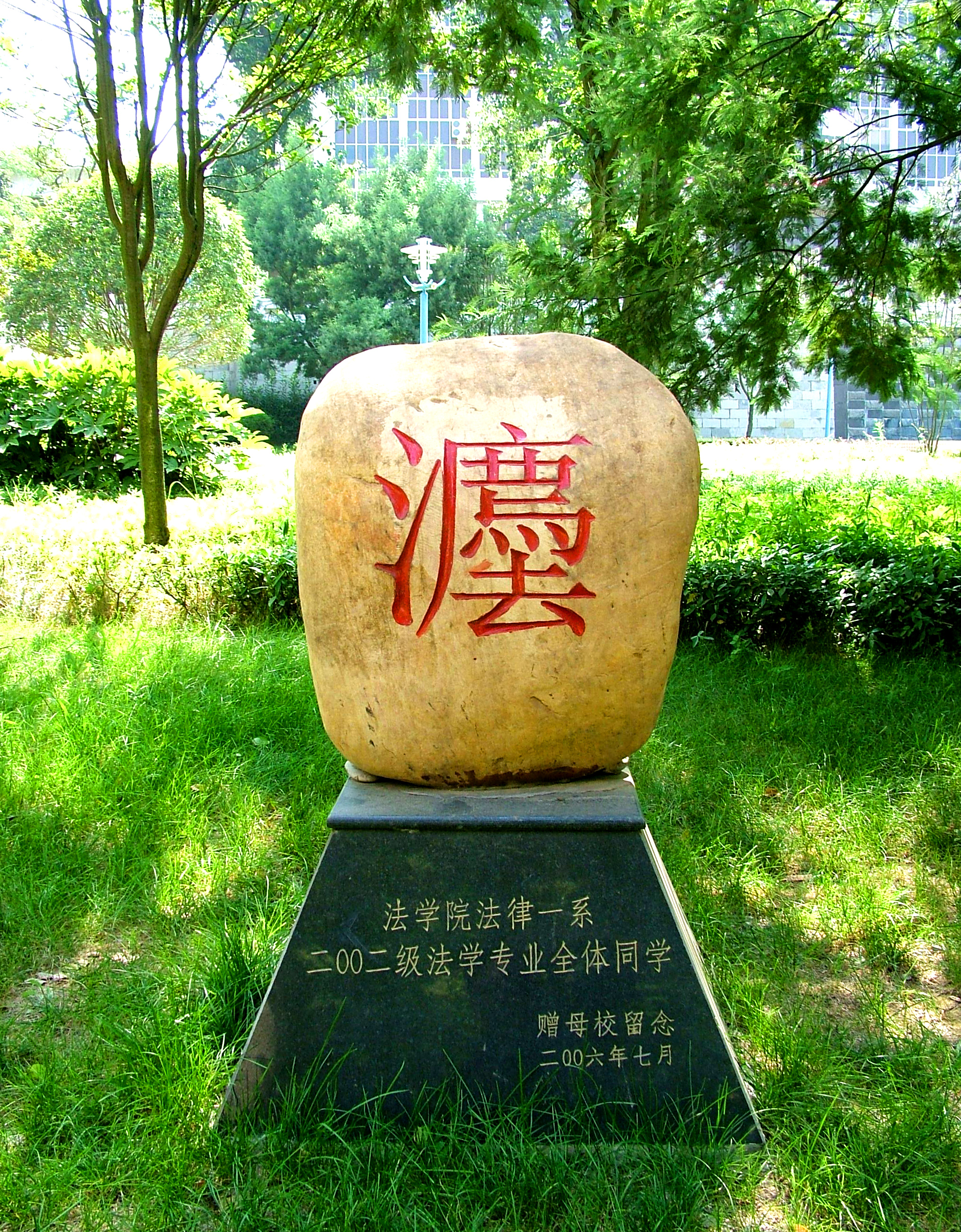
A Gift to the university from Law Students of Class 2002

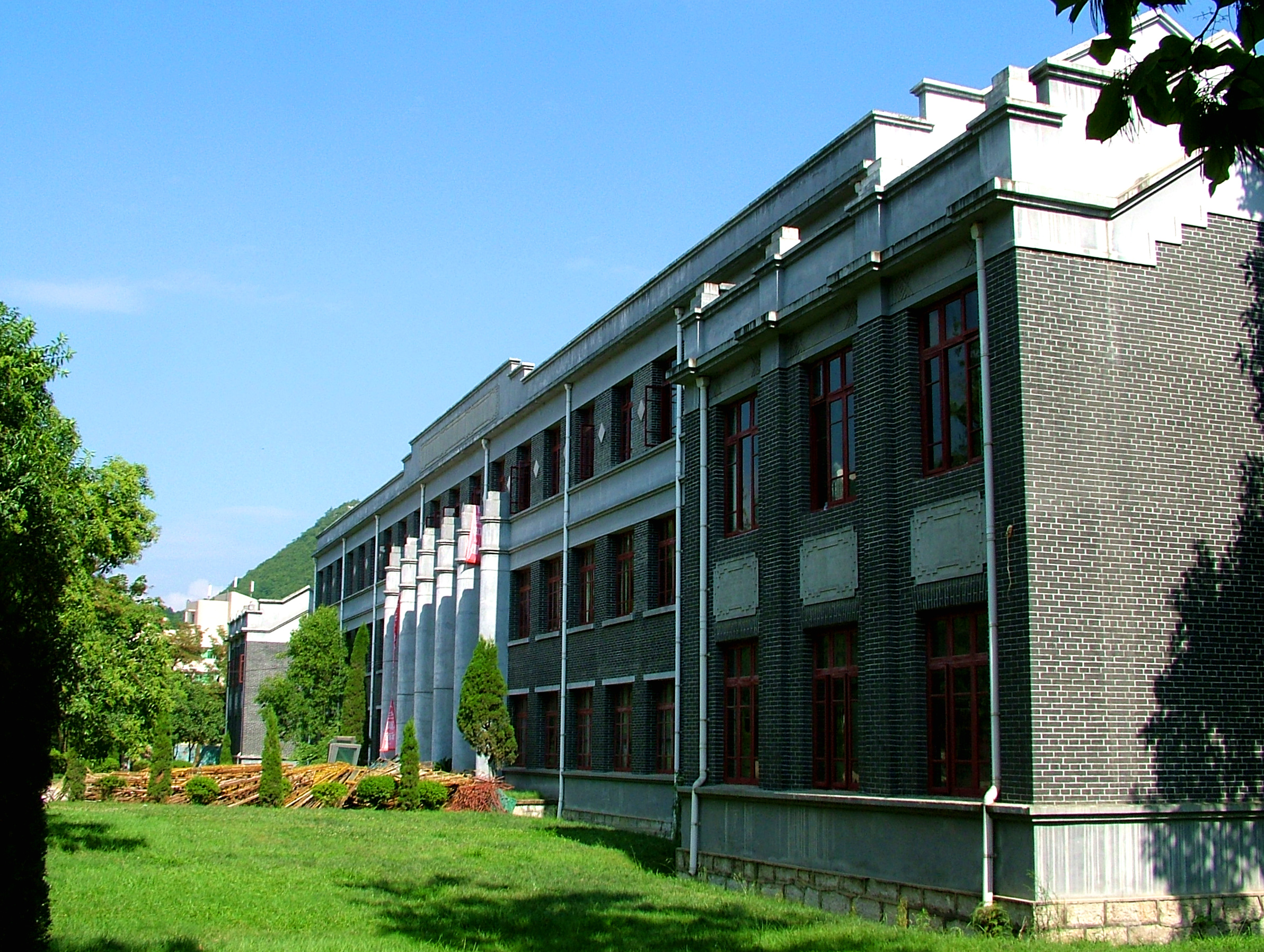
Department of Physics and Electronics-North Campus
