= Trams in Norrköping =

Tram network in Norrköping, Sweden

Norrköping tramway network
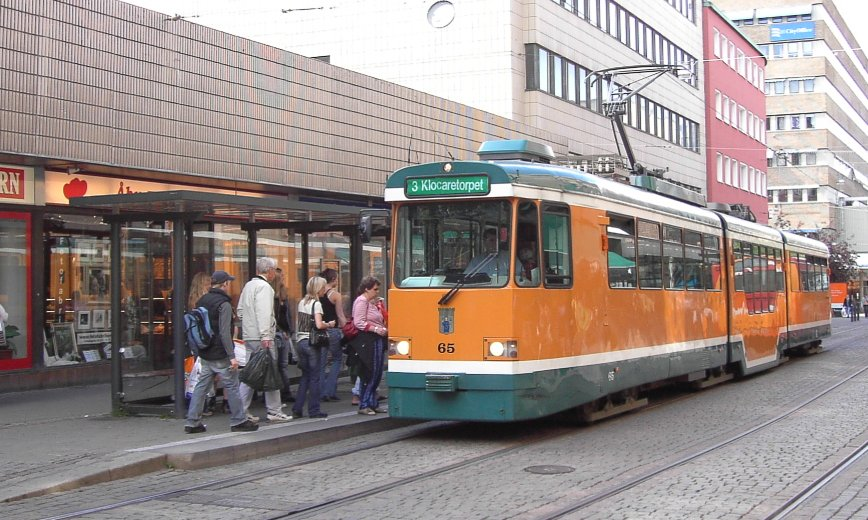
- A Duewag M97 tram at Söder Tull, as it leaves the city centre on Line 3 service

Overview
- Owner: Norrköping Municipality
- Locale: Norrköping, Östergötland, Sweden
- Transit type: Tram
- Number of lines: 2 (+1 seasonal heritage tram line)
- Number of stations: 49

Operation
- Began operation: 10 March 1904
- Operator: Transdev
- Infrastructure manager: Östgötatrafiken

Technical
- System length: 18.7 km (11.6 mi)
- Track gauge: 1,435 mm (4 ft 8 1/2 in) (standard gauge)
System map

The Norrköping tramway network (Swedish: Norrköpings spårväg) is a system of trams forming a principal part of the public transport services in Norrköping, Sweden. It has been in service since 1904, and is, along with the larger Gothenburg tram network, one of only two city-centre tramways in Sweden that survived the switch to right-hand traffic in 1967, which led to the replacement of most Swedish tramways with buses to reduce the cost of replacing their now-unusable fleets.

== Routes ==
Line	Stretch	Travel	Length	Stations
Line 1	Downtown heritage tramway (Note: This heritage tramway is operated by the Swedish Tramway Society, utilizing heritage trams provided by the tram museum in Norrköping, and is seasonally run (i.e. runs in summer only) and so does not operate year-round.)		4.9 km (3.0 mi)	
Line 2	Fridvalla – Kvarnberget	41 min	11.8 km (7.3 mi)	31
Line 3	Vidablick – Klockaretorpet	49 min	9.2 km (5.7 mi)	25
Net total			18.7 km (11.6 mi)	49

Since 1966, there are two routes in the system. Line 2 runs from Fridvalla in the north to Ringdansen in the south along Östra Promenaden in the city centre. Line 3 runs between Vidablick in the north and Klockaretorpet in the south-west via Drottninggatan in the city centre. Both lines stop at the Norrköping Central Station (Resecentrum) where they provide interchange with the national railway network. Interchange with intracity, intercity and suburban bus routes are provided at mainly Resecentrum and Söder tull.

Until 1958, a separate Line 1 trafficked the city centre as a loop, using the stretch of tracks in Kungsgatan (that was since removed in 1961). There is a modern heritage tram Line 1, trafficked with heritage trams from the tram museum in Norrköping, but it operates only seasonally (i.e. summers-only).

As of 2011, Line 2 has been extended to Ringdansen. Until 2006, the Line ended in Klingsberg. In the early 21st century, work began to extend the Line to Ringdansen, some 3 kilometres (1.9 mi) south of Klingsberg. The first part of the extension, to Ljura, opened in 2006 – this stage was only some 350 meters (380 yards) long. This section leaves the Klingsberg track at the Albrektsvägen stop, which means that Klingsberg lost its tram service. Work on the second stage started in 2009, and on October 21, 2010 some 2 kilometres (1.2 mi) of new tramway opened, from Ljura to Trumpetaregatan in Hageby. The third section, from Trumpetaregatan to Ringdansen, was inaugurated exactly one year later, 21 October 2011.

== Operations ==
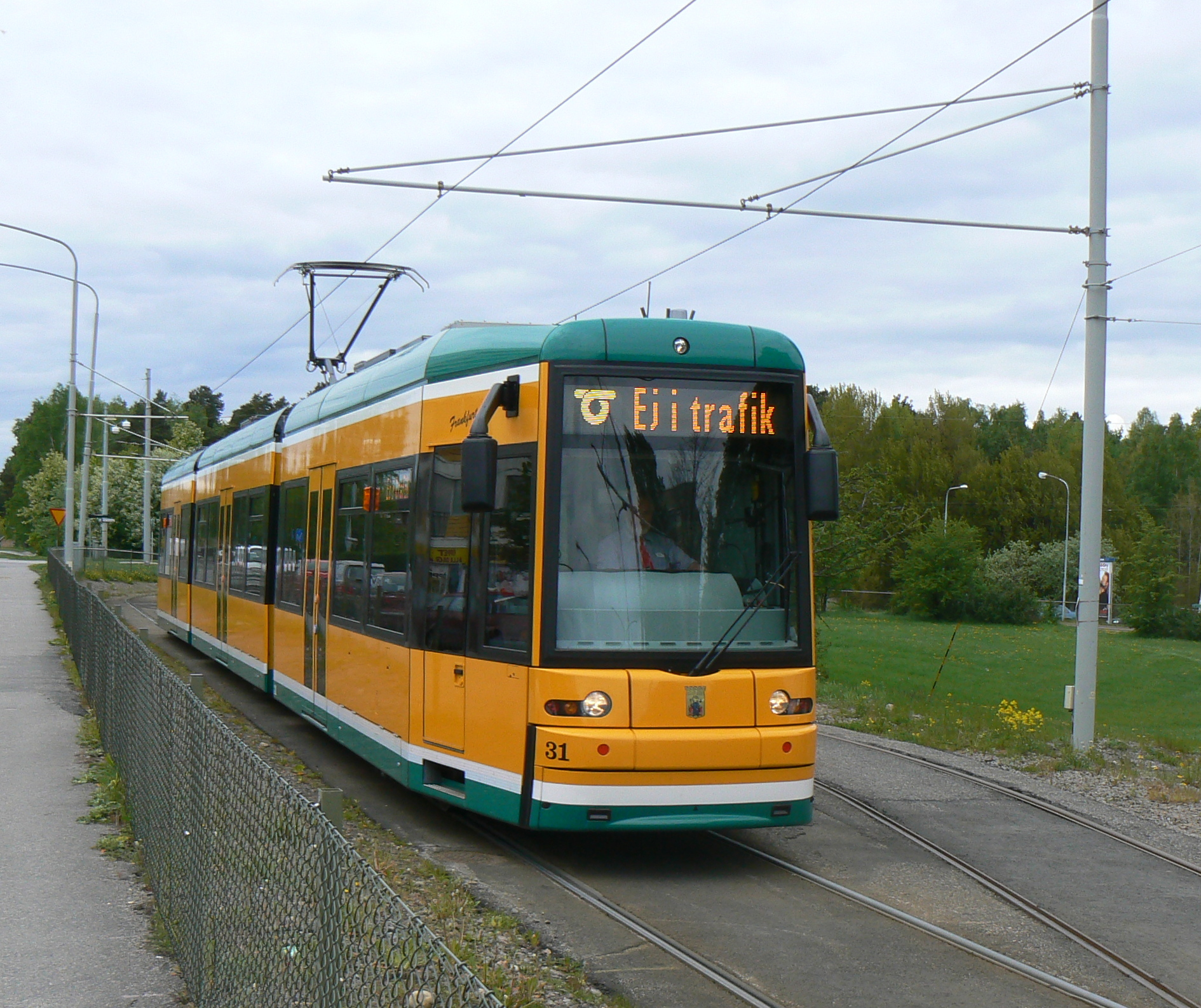
Bombardier Flexity Classic at Vidablick, the northern terminus of Line 3

The Norrköping tramway is a standard-gauge electrically powered system. The infrastructure and the trams are owned by Norrköping Municipality. It has track loops at the end of the lines and at various other points to allow turnbacks, as older trams were uni-directional. Today most trams are bi-directional but they are operated as uni-directional. The tram depot is located off Östra Promenaden, between the Djäkneparksskolan and Centralbadet stops.

Services have been operated by Transdev on behalf of the regional transport authority ÖstgötaTrafiken since 2004. The most recent contract that will run for eight years, commenced in June 2025.

=== Rolling stock ===
In 1994 15 Duewag M97 trams were acquired from Duewag with five remaining in service in 2026. Twenty-two Bombardier Flexity Classic trams are operated numbered 31-52, with the latter six previoualy operated in Stockholm.

Formerly in service were the single ex Bremen and the three ex Munich Type GT6N prototypes, which were withdrawn from service in 2015 after the catenary voltage was raised from 600 to 750 volts. The ex-Bremen tram (the world's first modern low floor tram) was returned to the north-german city for preservation.

As a stop gap measure six Tatra T6A2D were bought from Berlin's transit agency BVG until the arrival of the Flexity Classic on loan to Stockholm in January and February 2011. After arrival of the remaining M06 all Tatra trams were withdrawn from service also due to expiring certificates. There are plans to convert one T6A2D into a maintenance vehicle.
