= Flexity Classic =

Family of trams

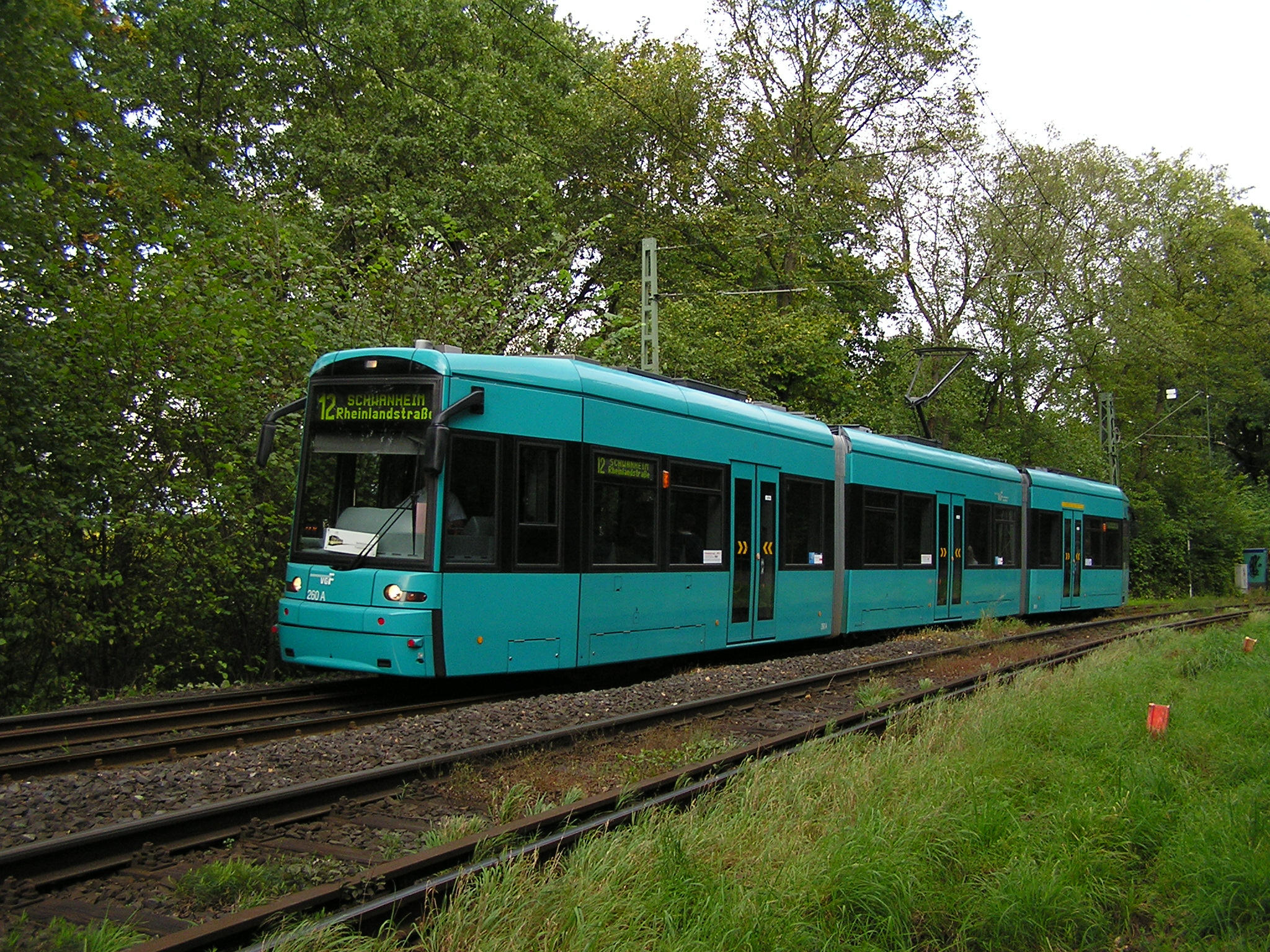
- A 2000s facelift Flexity Classic in Frankfurt

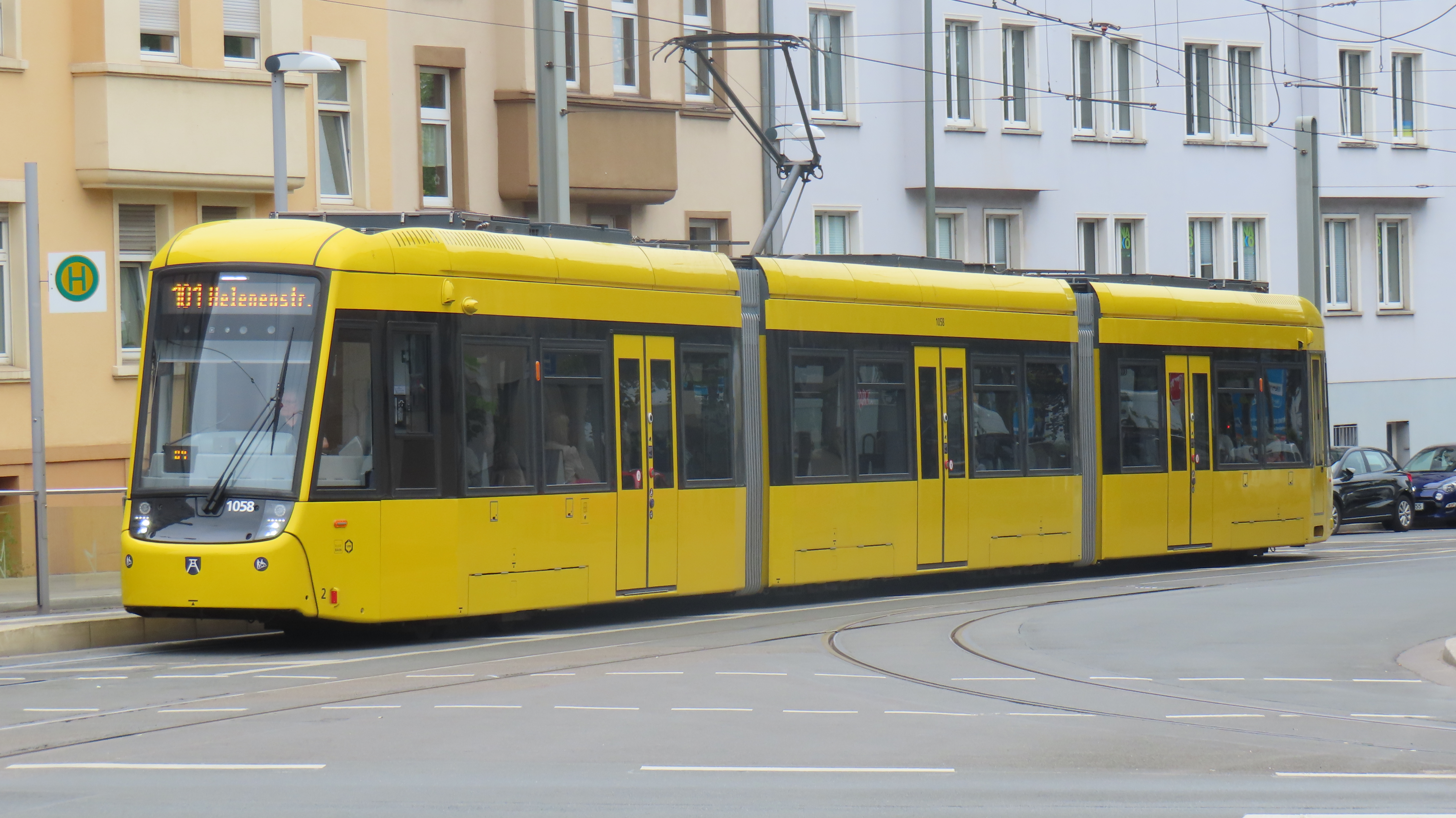
- A 2020s facelift Flexity Classic tram in Essen
- Manufacturer: Bombardier Transportation (2003–2021); Alstom (2021–present)
- Designer: Deutsche Waggonbau
- Family name: Flexity
- Constructed: 2003–present
- Predecessor: Essen M8D-NF (1999–2001) Kassel 8NGTW (1999–2003) Krakow NGT6 (1998–1999)

Specifications
- Low-floor: 65–74%
- Track gauge: 1,000 mm (3 ft 3 3/8 in); 1,435 mm (4 ft 8 1/2 in); 1,450 mm (4 ft 9 3/32 in); 1,458 mm (4 ft 9 13/32 in)

The Flexity Classic is a tram model introduced in 2006 and manufactured by Alstom after it acquired Bombardier Transportation in 2021. Although it is marketed as the most traditionally designed member of the Flexity family, it is a modern bi-directional articulated tram with suspended body segments. The low-floor sections allow good accessibility, especially to passengers in wheelchairs. The design and initial production was carried out by Deutsche Waggonbau (DWA), using the LF2000 name.

Flexity models operate in a number of German cities, as well as in Stockholm (2010–2020), Norrköping and Gothenburg (Sweden), Kraków and Gdańsk (Poland), and Adelaide in South Australia. Most Flexity Classic trams run on 1,435 mm (4 ft 8 1/2 in) standard gauge, but run on 1,000 mm (3 ft 3 3/8 in) metre gauge in Essen, on 1,450 mm (4 ft 9 3/32 in) gauge in Dresden, and on 1,458 mm (4 ft 9 13/32 in) gauge in Leipzig.

Along with other varieties of Flexity trams, the Flexity Classic's closest competitors are the Combino, Avenio and Avanto manufactured by Siemens and, prior to the take-over of Bombardier, Alstom's Citadis. Following the Combino metal fatigue crisis in 2004, the Flexity Classic became the most popular tram model in Germany for almost a decade.

== Adelaide ==
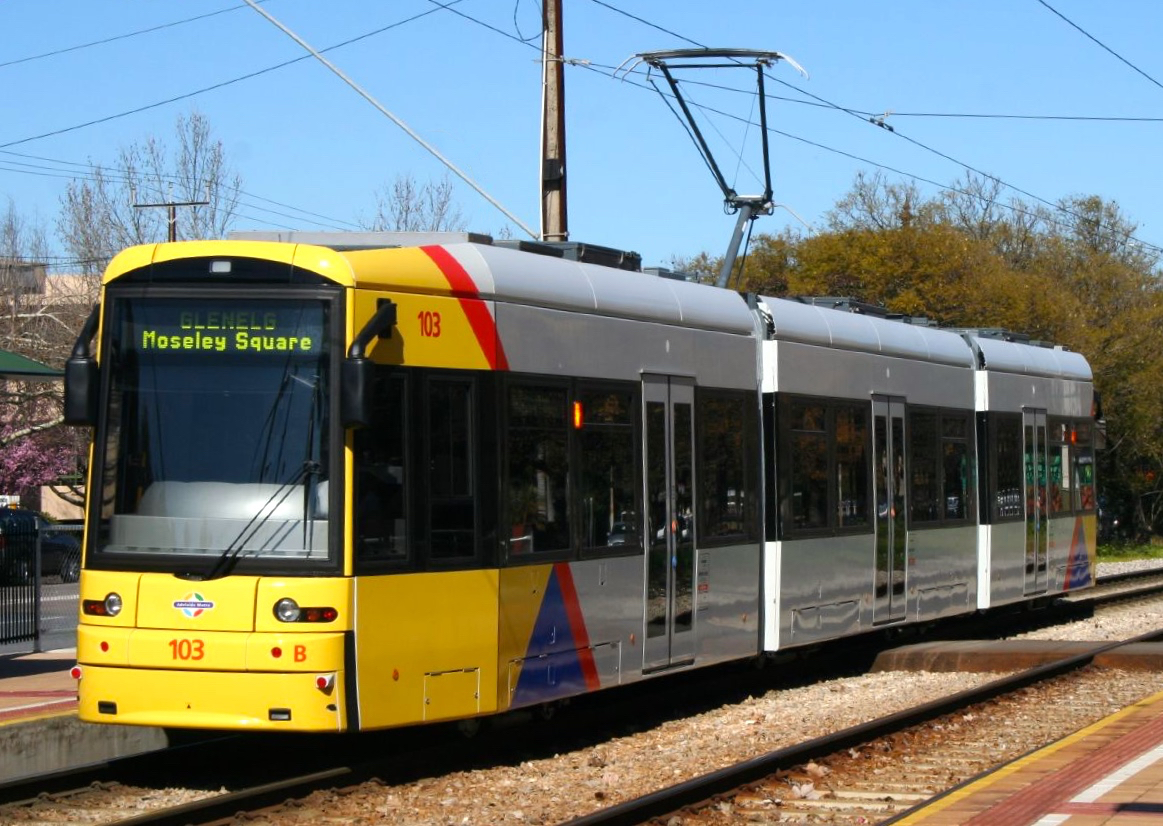
A 100 Series Bombardier Flexity tram on the 9.3 km (5.8 mi) private reserve section of the line to Glenelg

In 2006, TransAdelaide began to replace the Type H cars operating on the Glenelg tram line with 11 Flexity Classic trams built in Bautzen, Germany by Bombardier Transportation. The first of the new cars was delivered to the Glengowrie depot in November 2005 and entered revenue service on 9 January 2006. A further order of four in 2008 brought the total to 15, numbered 101–115.

The Flexity cars are painted in a standard Adelaide Metro colour scheme of white with yellow, blue and red ends. The trams have low floors throughout 70 per cent of their length, and are accessible to pushchairs and wheelchairs through each of the three sets of doors. Their features include air conditioning, heating, recorded video surveillance and automated audio and visual announcements of the next stop. Roving conductors are employed.

The internal layout accommodates 64 seated passengers and another 115 standing. Initial overcrowding owing to the popularity of the rejuvenated Glenelg line and the short route extension through the business area of Adelaide, and the inadequacy of air conditioning in Adelaide's hot summers, led to adverse reactions from commuters and local media, but the faults were soon rectified and supplementation by Alstom Citadis trams (200 Series) has minimised overcrowding.

=== Specifications ===
Flexity trams
Track gauge:	1,435 mm (4 ft 8 1/2 in) standard gauge
Power source:	600 V DC overhead wire
Traction:	4 motors
Number in class:	15
Unit numbers:	101–115
Introduced:	2006 (11), 2008 (4)
Built by:	Bombardier Transportation; Bautzen, Germany
Passenger capacity:	64 seated; 115 standing
Weight:	40 tonnes (39 long tons; 44 short tons)
Length:	30 m (98 ft 5 1/8 in)
Width:	2.4 m (7 ft 10 1/2 in)

== Dresden and Leipzig ==
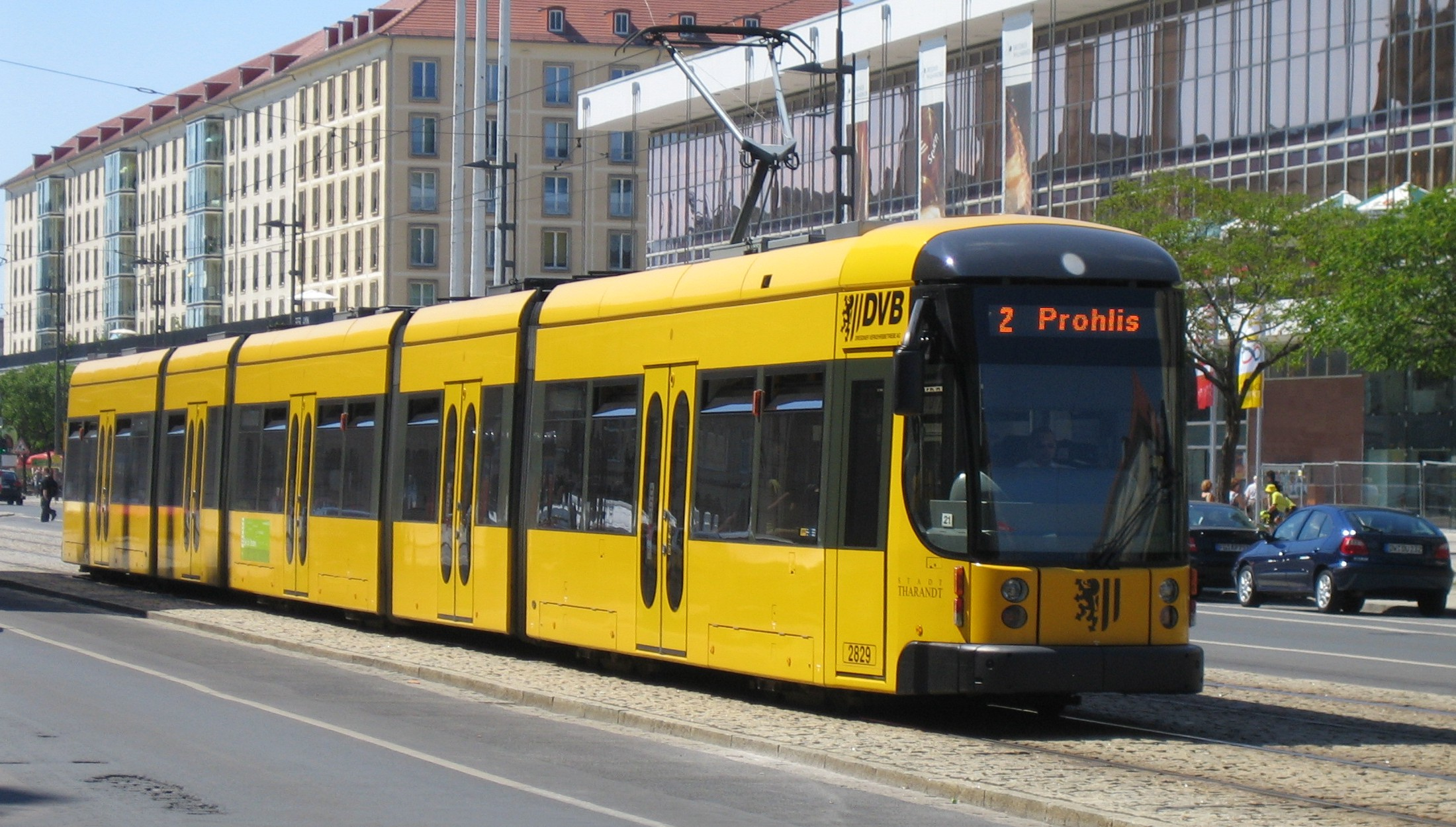
Flexity Classic XXL in Dresden.

The Flexity Classic XXL model was developed for the Dresden Transport Authority by the German factory Bombardier Transportation in Bautzen. It is 45 metres (147 ft 7 5/8 in) long, runs on twelve axles and has a capacity of 260 passengers with 153 seats. The Flexity Classic XXL (classification NGT D12DD) has, because of Dresden's altitude differences of 100 metres (330 ft), a power-to-weight ratio of 112 kg/hp (247 lb/hp; 150 kg/kW). The tram has been in service since 2003 and serves tram lines with a high peak load of passengers. The exterior is specially designed for the Dresden Transport Authority, which owns 43 trams.

The Flexity Classic XXL is also in service in Leipzig, Germany (classification NGT12-LEI) with the Leipzig Transport Authority (LVB). Although the exterior design is customized, the tram offers the same capacity. It has been in service since 2005. The LVB first ordered 12 trams of this type, then exercised an option for another 12 trams in September 2005 and a third (slightly changed) batch of 9 was delivered in late 2011/early 2012.

== Gallery ==
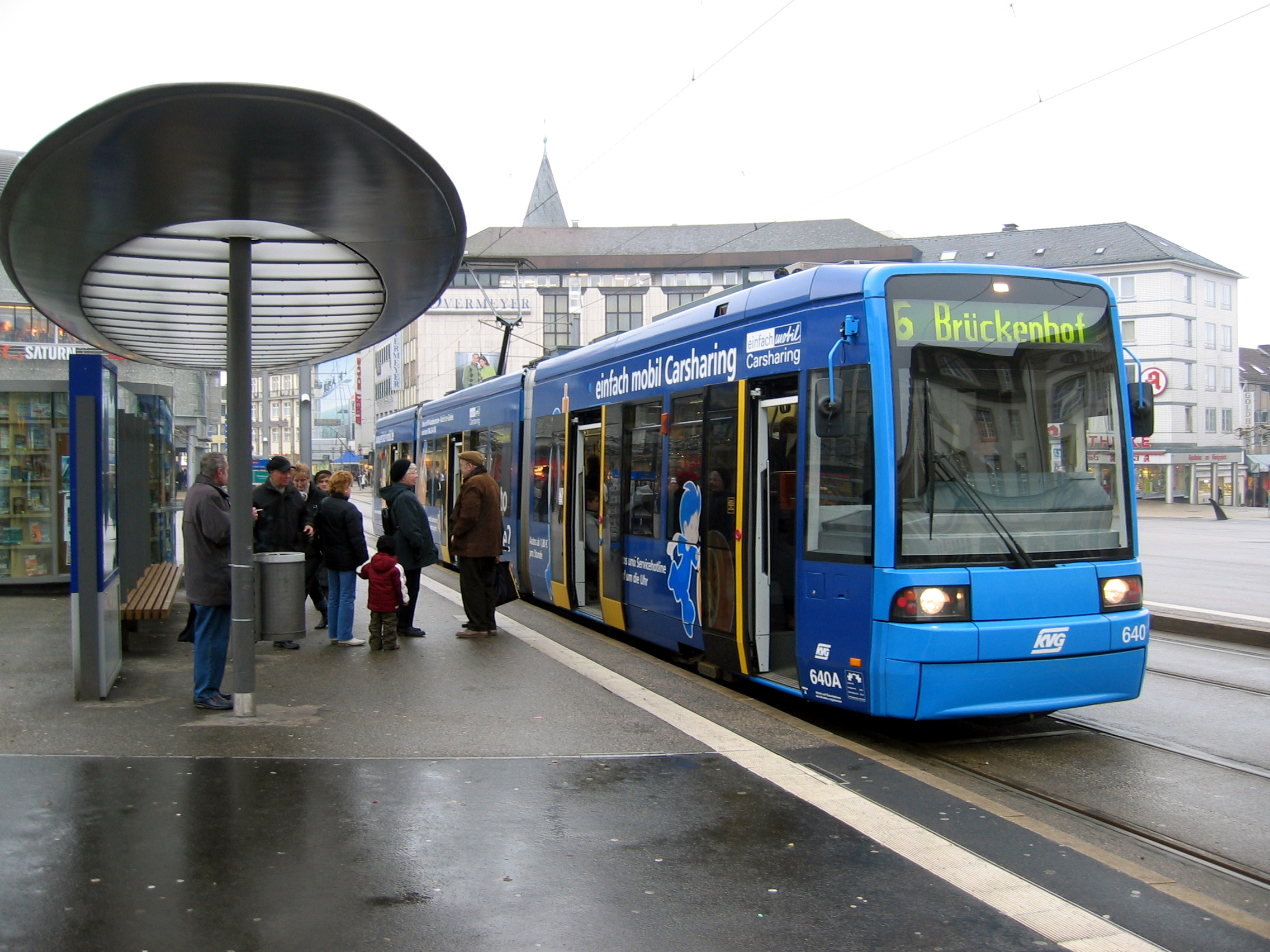
One out of ten bi-directional Flexity Classic on the Kassel tram network, Germany

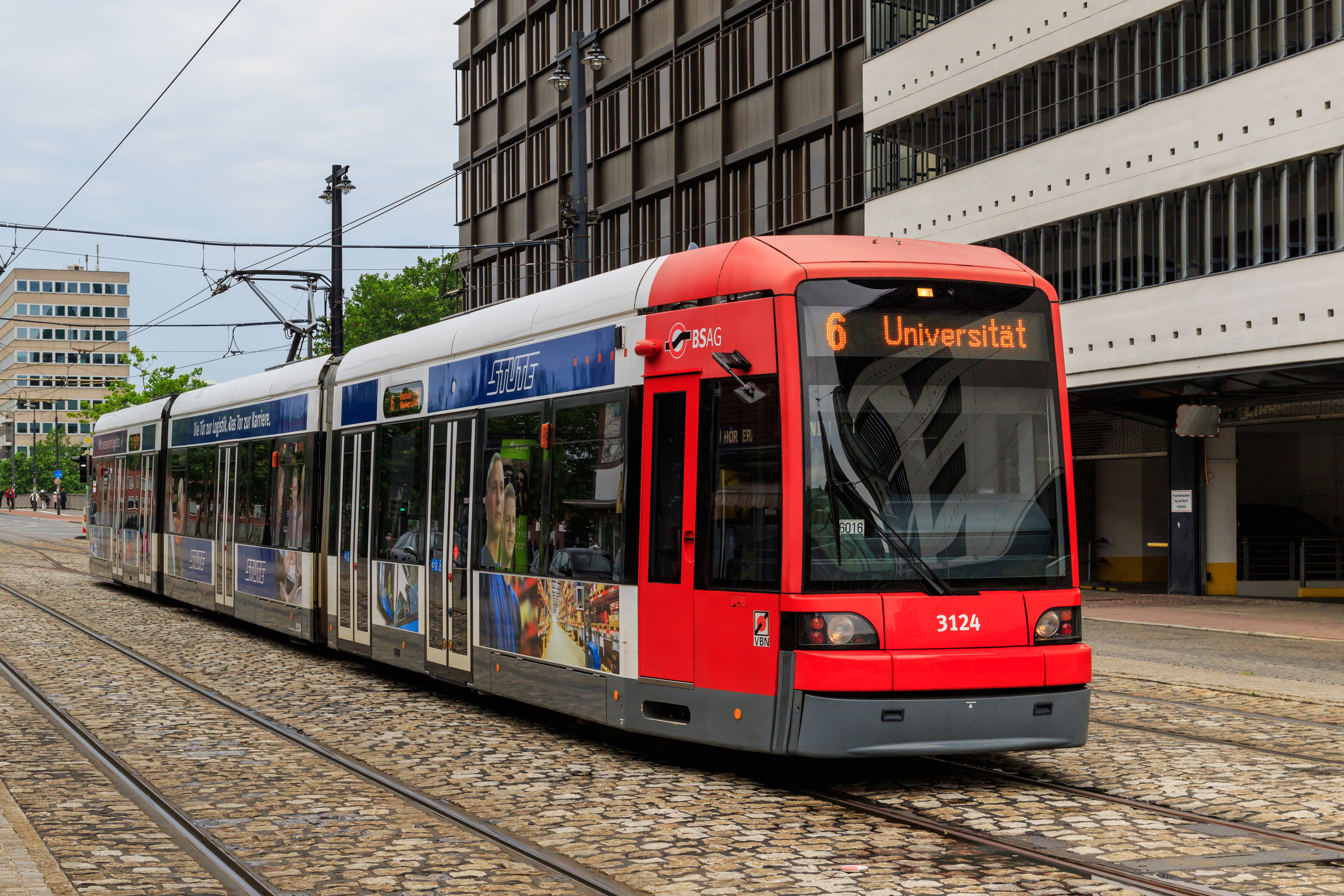
Flexity Classic in service on line 6 in Bremen, Germany

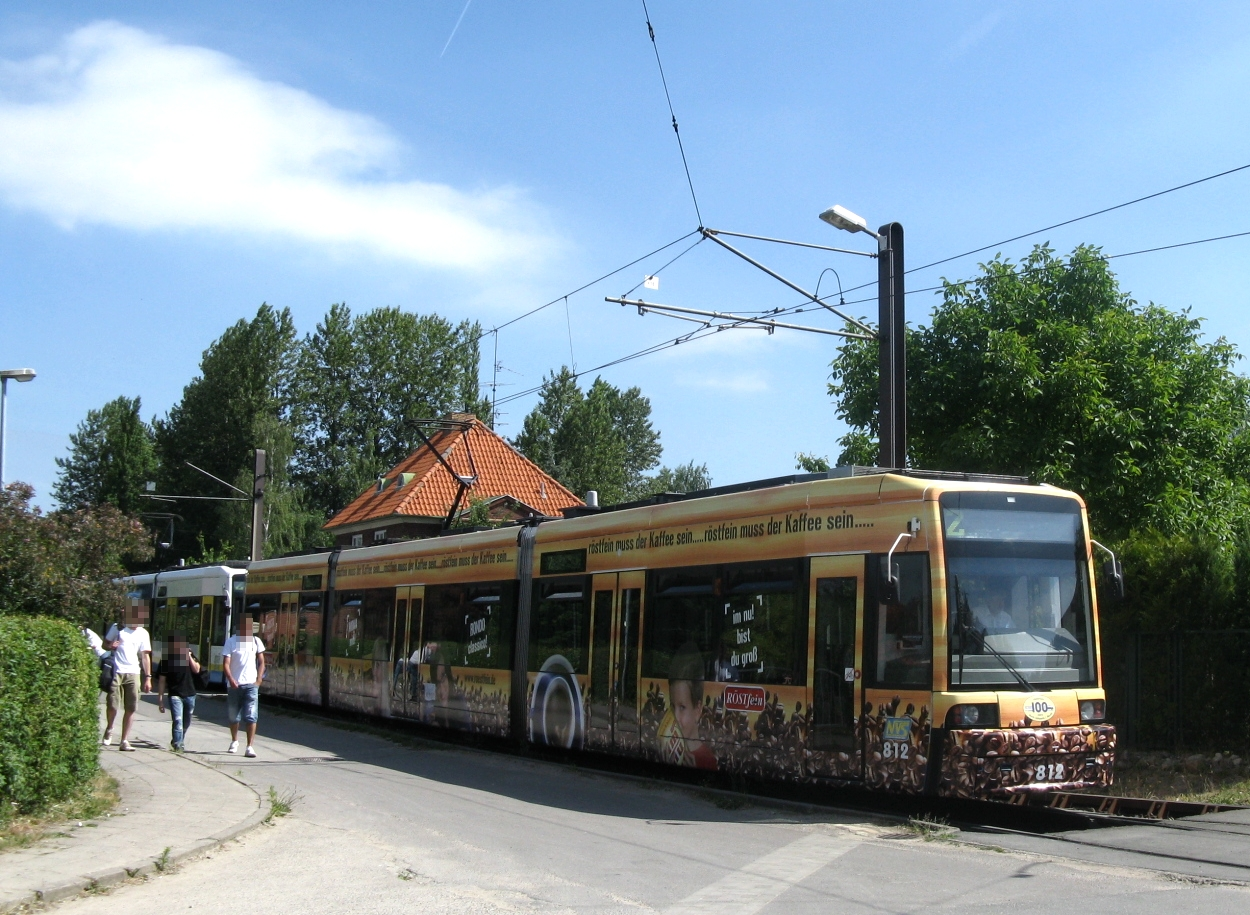
Flexity Classic of the “Nahverkehr Schwerin” (NVS) network in Schwerin, Germany

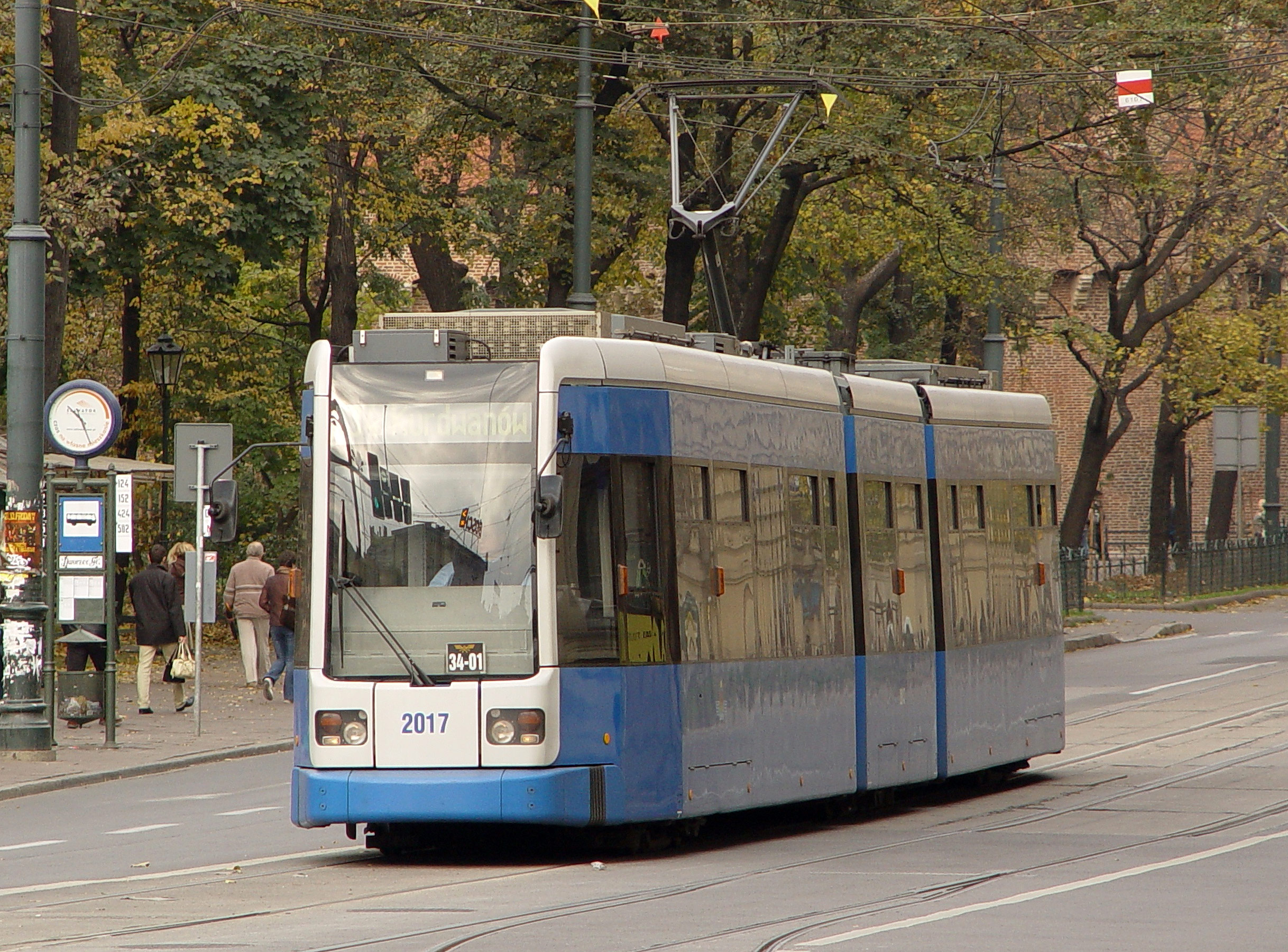
Flexity Classic (NGT6) in service in Kraków on the “Krakowski Szybki Tramwaj” (Krakowian Fast Tram) network, Poland

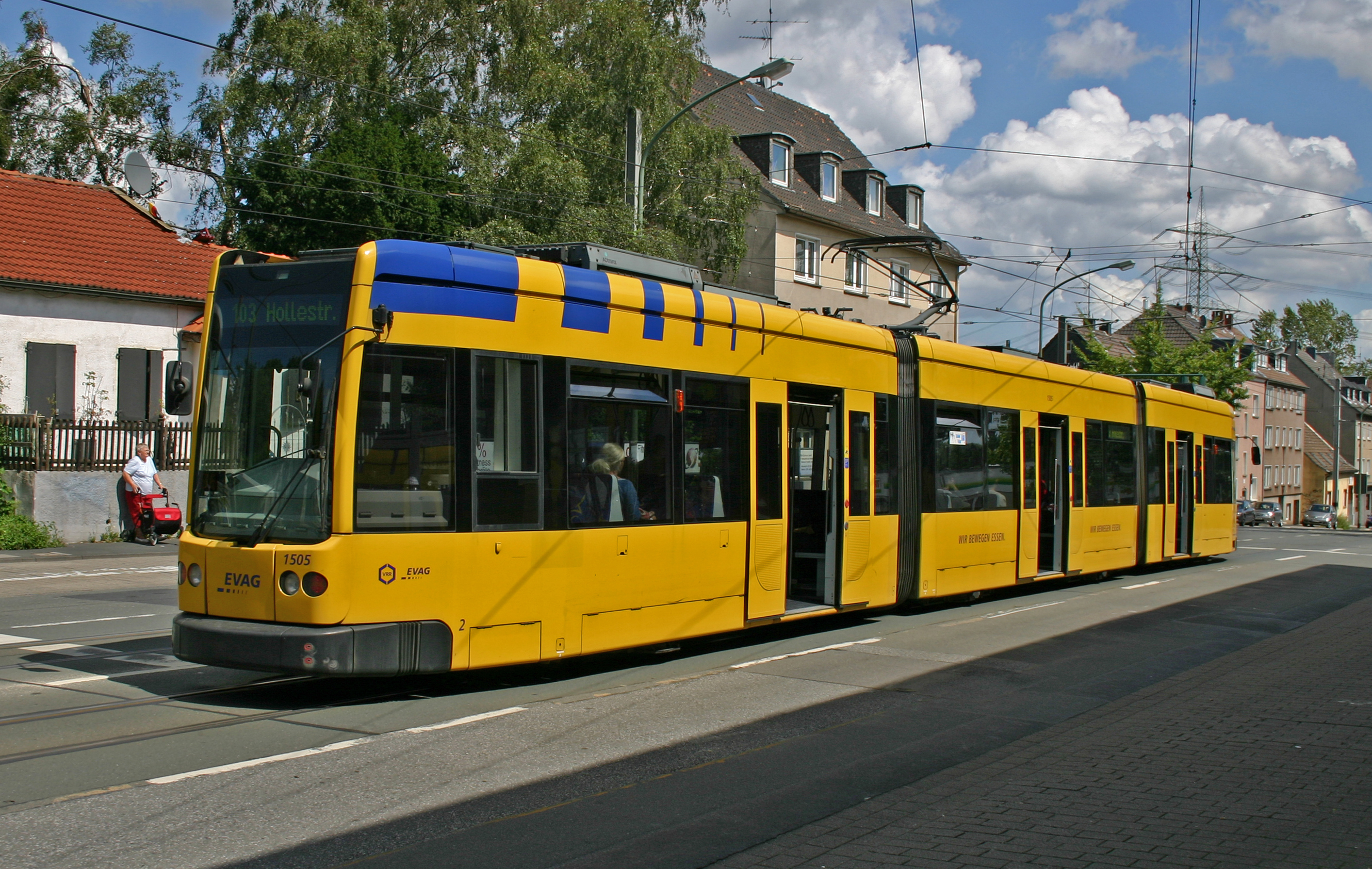
Flexity Classic in service on line 103 in Essen, Germany

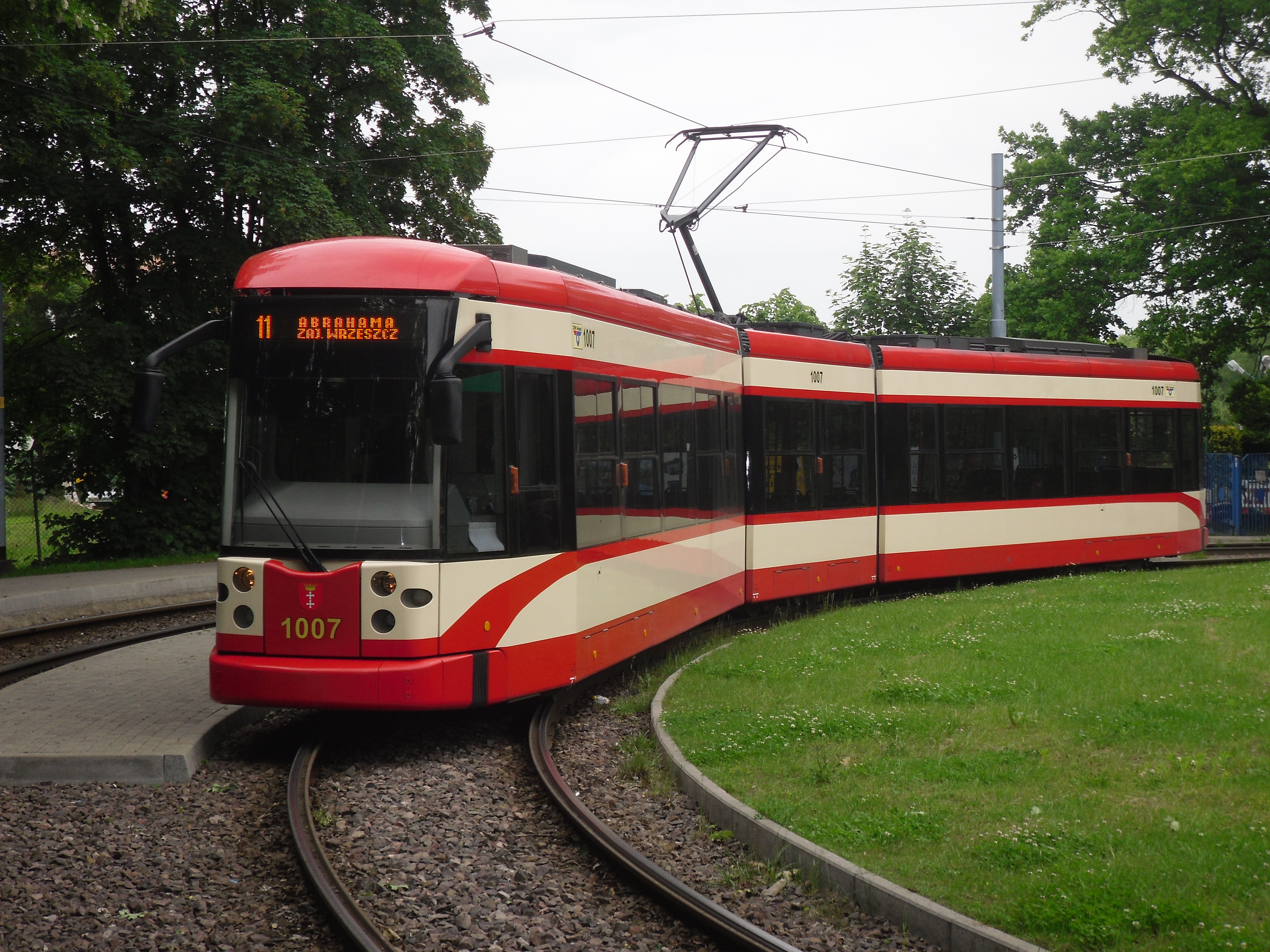
Flexity Classic (NGT6) in service at Strzyża PKM in Gdańsk, Poland

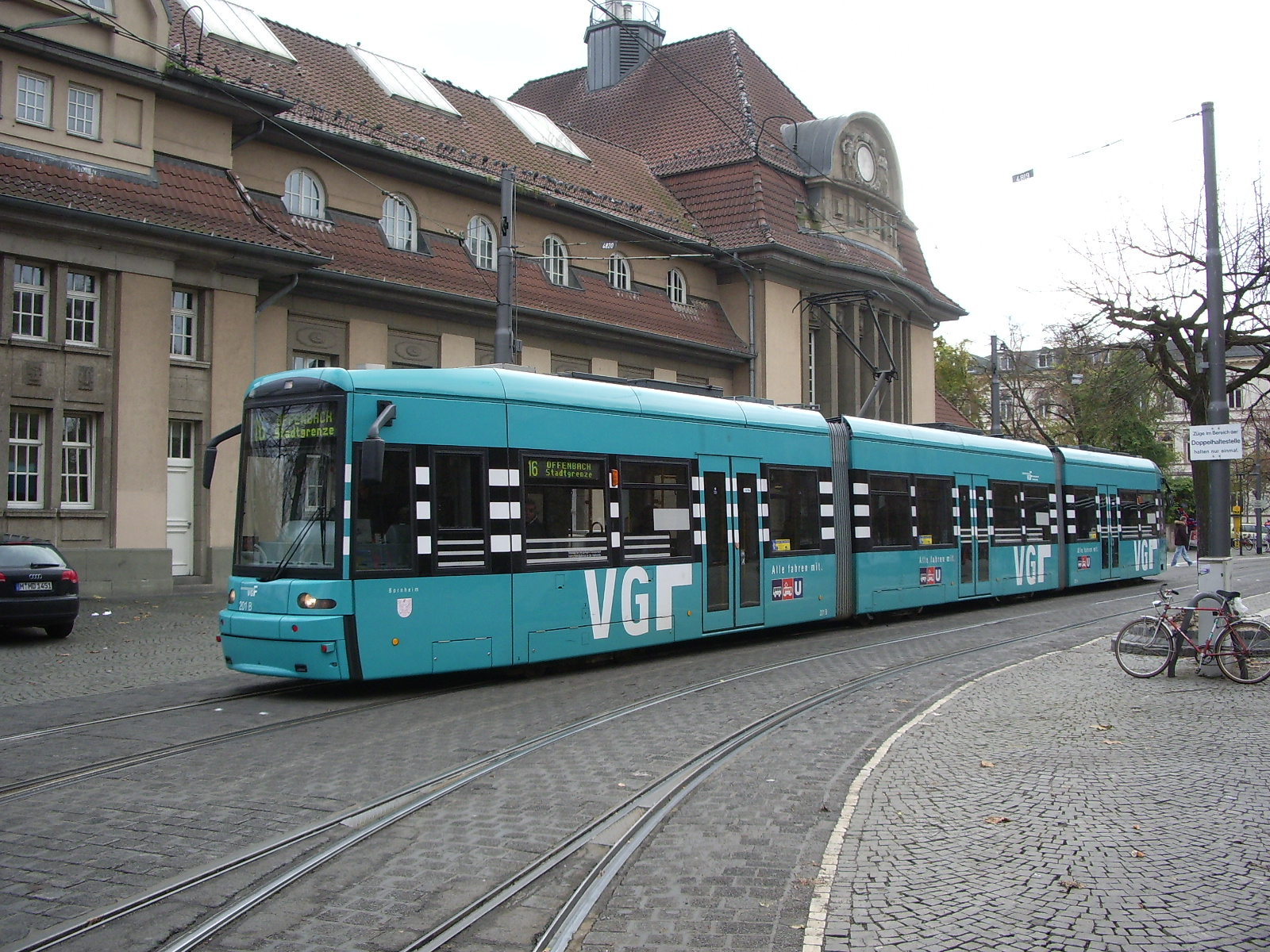
A Flexity Classic tram in Frankfurt am Main

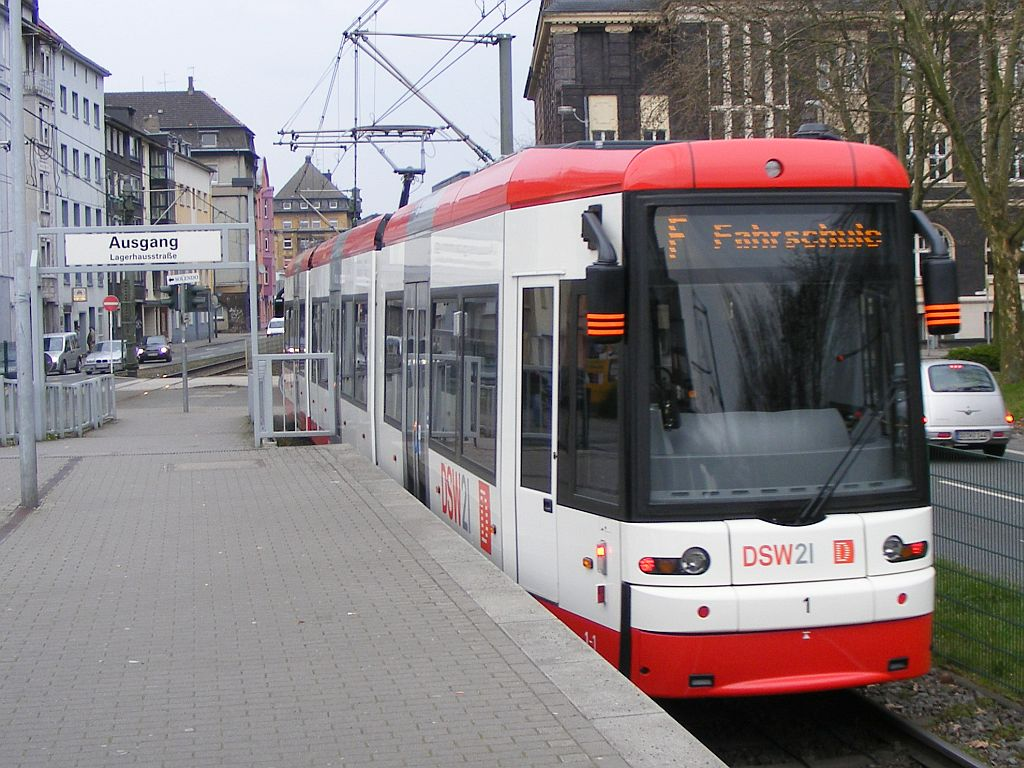
NGT8 type Flexity Classic at the Harbor station of the “DSW21” network in Dortmund, Germany

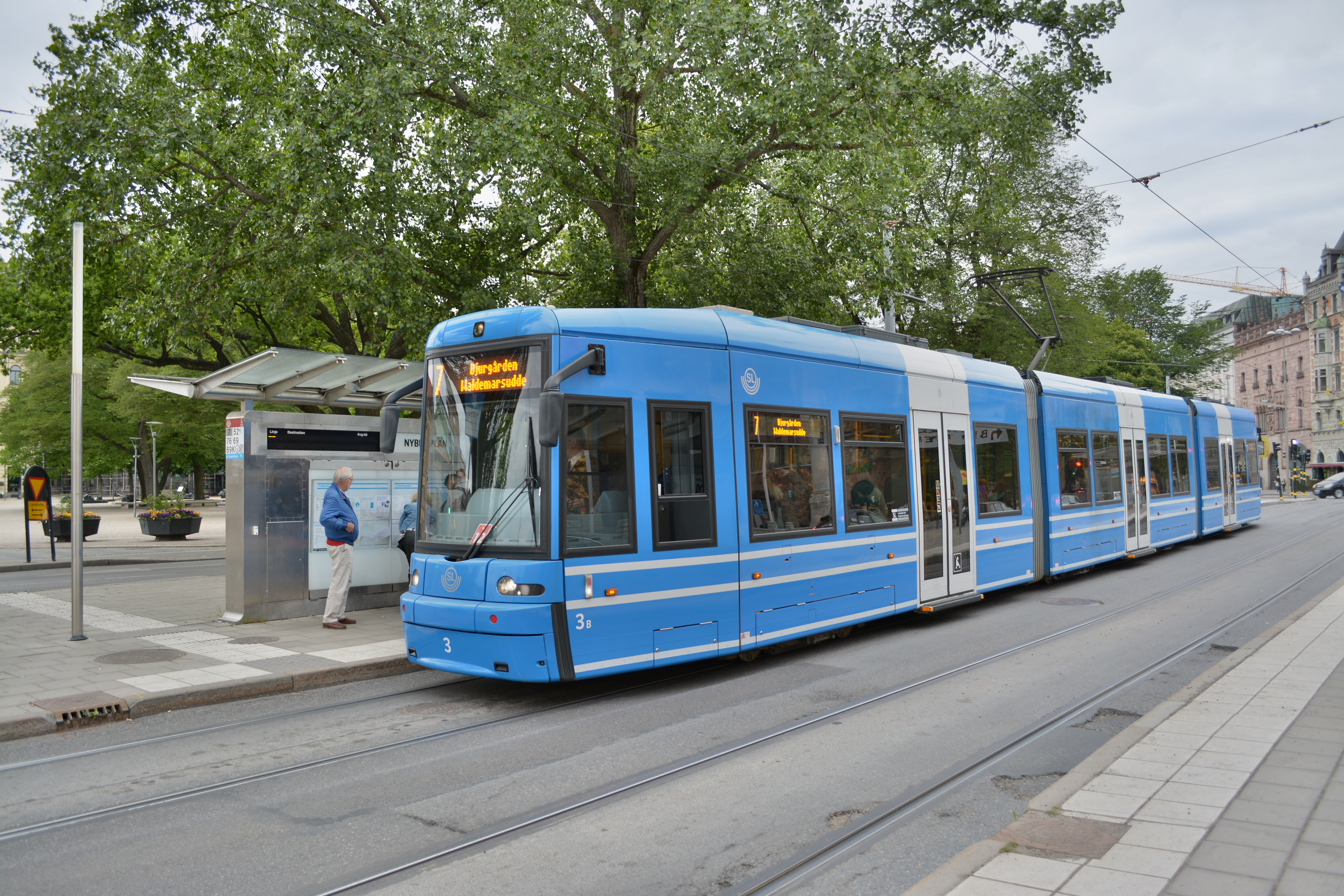
Flexity Classic on the Spårväg City Line (an extension of the Djurgården Line) in Stockholm, Sweden

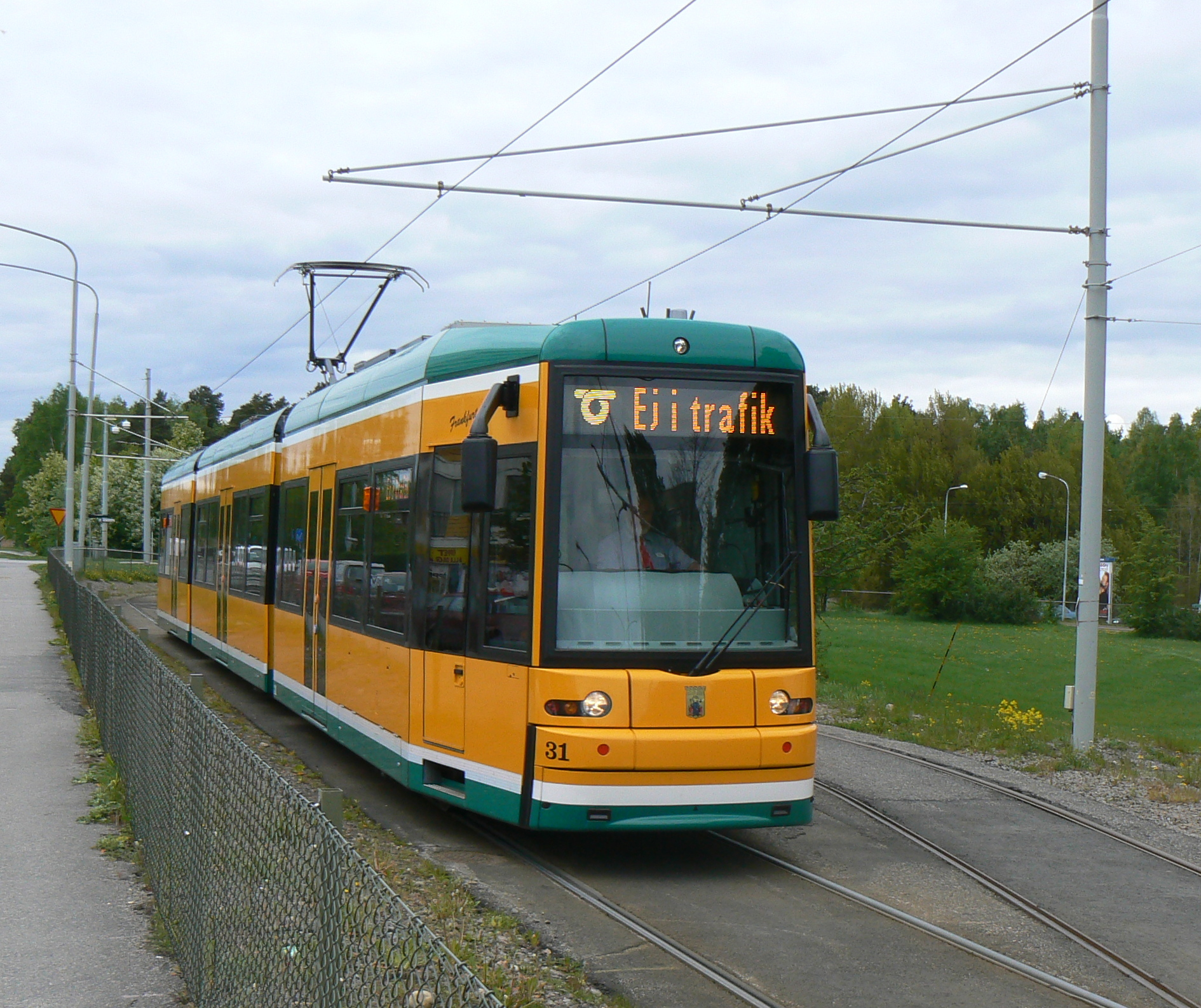
Flexity Classic on the tramway in Norrköping, Sweden
