= Trams in Schwerin =

Coordinates: 53°37′43″N 11°24′38″E

Schwerin tramway network
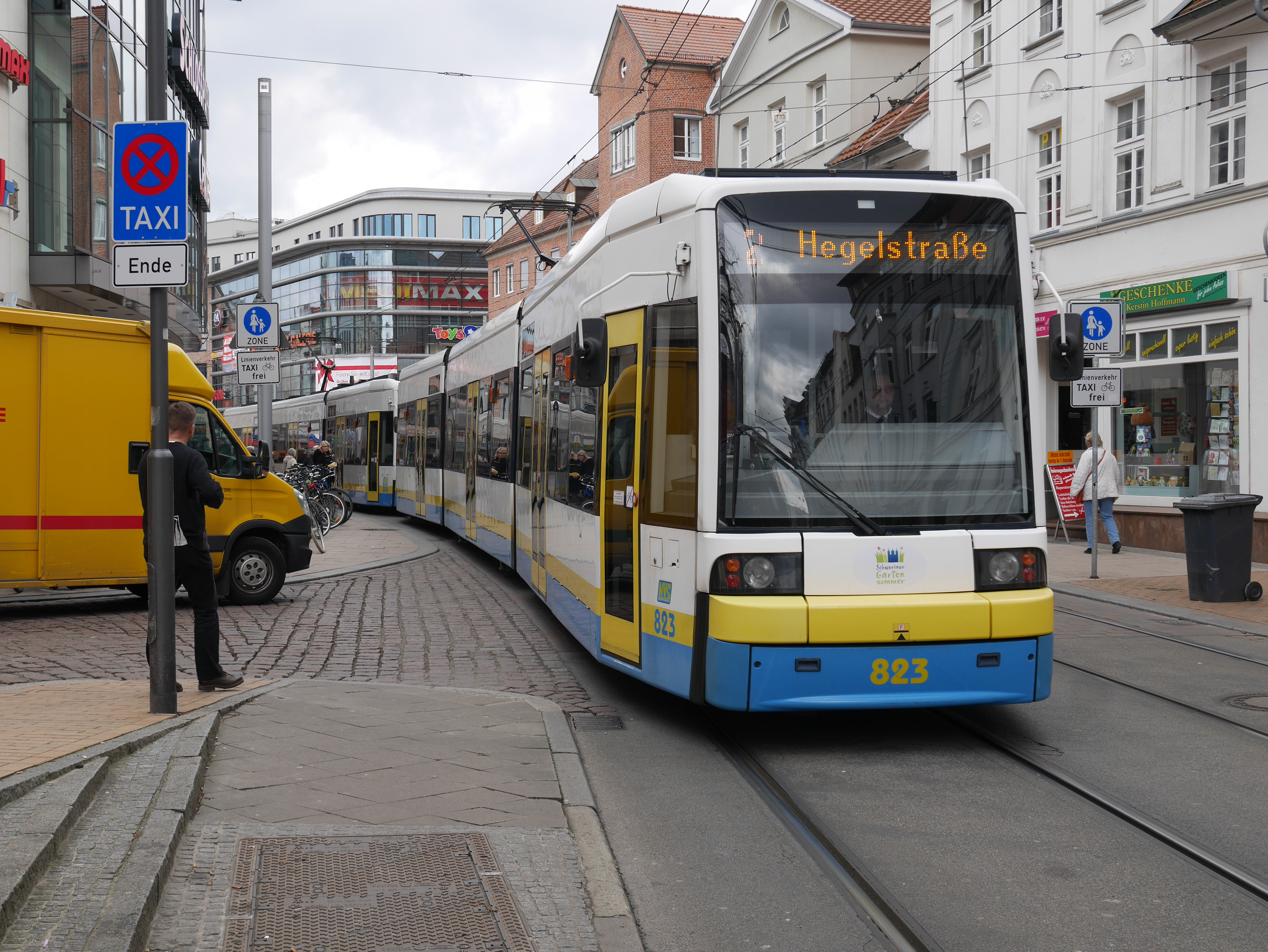
- SN2001 tram in Schwerin, 2016

Operation
- Locale: Schwerin, Mecklenburg-Vorpommern, Germany

Statistics
Horsecar era: 1881–1885
- Status: Converted to electricity
- Lines: 2
- Propulsion system: Horses
Electric tram era: since 1908
- Lines: 4
- Operator: Nahverkehr Schwerin GmbH
- Track gauge: 1,435 mm (4 ft 8 1/2 in)
- Propulsion system: Electricity
- Electrification: 600 V DC
- Stock: 30 Flexity Classic SN2001
- Track length (total): 22.5 km (14.0 mi)
- Route length: 40.5 km (25.2 mi)
- 2009: 12,480,000
Schwerin tramway network, 2025.
- Website: http://www.nahverkehr-schwerin.de/ Nahverkehr Schwerin (in German)

The Schwerin tramway network (German: Straßenbahnnetz Schwerin) is a network of tramways forming the key feature of the public transport system in Schwerin, the capital city of the federal state of Mecklenburg-Vorpommern, Germany.

Opened on 1 December 1908, the electrically powered network is currently operated by Nahverkehr Schwerin GmbH, and has four lines.

== Lines ==
The network's four lines, and their headways during the day (depending in part upon the time of day, or day of week) are:

Line	Route	Headway
1	Kliniken – Hegelstraße	15 / 20 / 30 minutes
2	Lankow Siedlung – Hegelstraße	15 / 20 / 30 minutes
3	Hegelstraße – Neu Pampow	30 minutes (Monday-Friday, mornings and afternoons)
4	Platz der Freiheit – Neu Pampow	30 / 60 minutes

== Rolling stock ==
The current fleet consists of 30 Flexity Classic SN2001 low-floor trams, manufactured from 2001 to 2003 by Bombardier Transportation in Bautzen. The three-section trams are 30 m long with space for 199 passengers, including 84 seated. Beginning in 2019 the trams were modernised with new electronics from Kiepe Electric and air conditioning.

== See also ==
- List of town tramway systems in Germany
- Trams in Germany

== Bibliography ==
- Bauer, Gerhard; Kuschinski, Norbert (1995). Die Straßenbahnen in Ostdeutschland [The Tramways in East Germany]. Vol. Band 3: Berlin, Brandenburg, Mecklenburg-Vorpommern [Volume 3: Berlin, Brandenburg, Mecklenburg-Vorpommern]. Aachen, Germany: Schweers + Wall. ISBN 3921679818.
- Schwandl, Robert (2012). Schwandl's Tram Atlas Deutschland (in German and English) (3rd ed.). Berlin: Robert Schwandl Verlag. pp. 132–133. ISBN 9783936573336.
- Geschichte des Verkehrs in der Landeshauptstadt Schwerin [The History of Transport in the State Capital, Schwerin] (in German). Schwerin: NVS GmbH. 2008.
