= Trams in Bremen =

Tram system

Coordinates: 53°04′54″N 08°48′48″E

Bremen tramway network
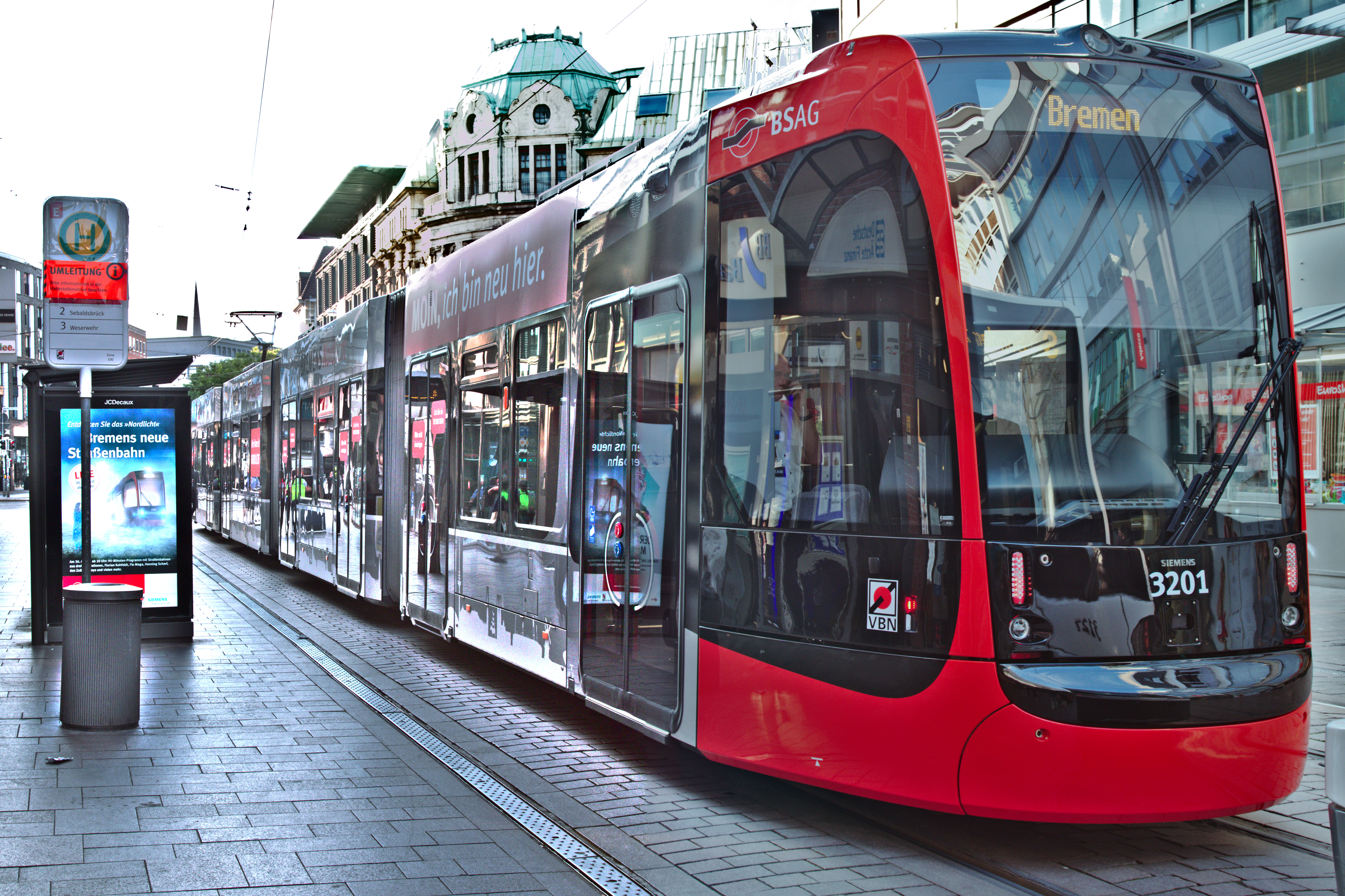
- A Siemens Avenio tram in Bremen

Operation
- Locale: Bremen, Bremen, Germany

Statistics
Horsecar era: 1876–1913
- Status: Converted to electricity
- Propulsion system: Horses
Electric tram era: since 1892
- Status: Operational
- Lines: 7
- Operator: Bremer Straßenbahn AG (BSAG)
- Track gauge: 1,435 mm (4 ft 8 1/2 in) standard gauge
- Propulsion system: Electricity
- Electrification: 750 V DC overhead line
- Stock: 121
- Route length: 114.6 km (71.2 mi)
- 2004: 96.9 million
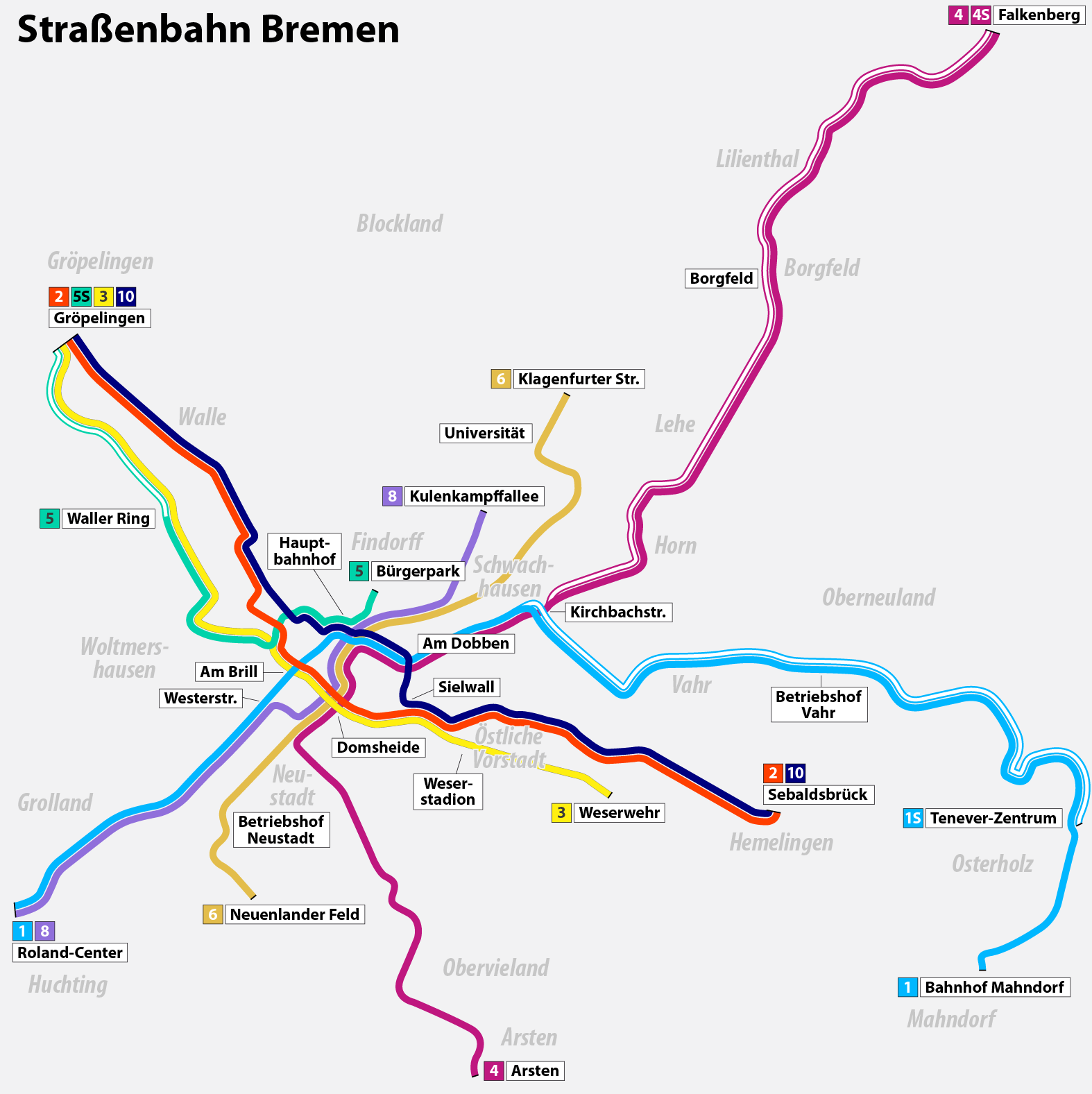
- BSAG tram network (2019)
- Website: http://www.bsag.de/eng/index.php BSAG

The Bremen tramway network (German: Straßenbahnnetz Bremen) is a network of tramways forming part of the public transport system in Bremen, Germany. The network is currently operated by Bremer Straßenbahn AG (BSAG; Bremen Tramways Company Ltd.), and integrated in the Verkehrsverbund Bremen/Niedersachsen (VBN; Bremen/Lower Saxony Transport Association). As of 2024, the network had eight lines, extending over 114.6 kilometres (71.2 mi) of route (up from 110.6 kilometres (68.7 mi) of route in 2011). Several sections have been brought to light rail standard, including viaducts, especially on the lines to Osterholz, Arsten and Huchting. These are also referred to as rapid tram lines.

== Lines ==
| Line | Route | No. of stops | every ... minutes |
|---|---|---|---|
| 1 | Huchting – Am Brill – Hauptbahnhof – Neue Vahr – Osterholz – Tenever – Weserpark – Bremen-Mahndorf station | 44 | 7.5 to 10 |
| 1S | Only in this direction: Tenever – Osterholz – Neue Vahr – Kirchbachstraße → continues as line 1E | 13 | 20 (only morning rush hour) |
| 2 | Gröpelingen – Walle – Am Brill – Domsheide – Hastedt – Sebaldsbrück | 33 | 10 |
| 3 | Gröpelingen – Überseestadt – Am Brill – Domsheide – Weserstadion – Weserwehr | 29 | 10 |
| 4 | Falkenberg – Borgfeld – Horn-Lehe – Hauptbahnhof – Domsheide – Huckelriede – Arsten | 39; 49 | 5 to 10 (Borgfeld - Arsten); 15 to 20 (Falkenberg - Arsten) |
| 4S | continues/arrives as line 4 → Kirchbachstraße – Horn-Lehe – Borgfeld – Falkenberg | 16 | 15 (only rush hour) |
| 5 | Hauptbahnhof - Überseestadt - Waterfront - Gröpelingen | 14 | 20 |
| 6 | Universität – Riensberg – Hauptbahnhof – Domsheide – Flughafen | 25 | 5 to 6 |
| 8 | Huchting – Am Neuen Markt (Neustadt) – Domsheide – Hauptbahnhof – Kulenkampffallee | 21 | 10 to 20 |
| 10 | Gröpelingen – Walle – Hauptbahnhof – Hastedt – Sebaldsbrück | 32 | 10 |

The lines with the suffix "S" (e.g. line 1S) are express lines, which do not stop at every station. Line 3S was discontinued in 2014 because of lack of available trams.

== History ==
=== Horse tramway ===
On 28 March 1876 the Aktiengesellschaft Bremer Pferdebahn was founded. The enterprise opened a horse tramway line from Herdentor to Vahrster Brücke on 4 June 1876, extending the line to Horn in 1877. In 1883, the extension from Herdentor to the stock exchange in the city centre was opened.

The rival company Große Bremer Pferdebahn, which used British capital, opened a line from Hastedt to Walle on 3 November 1879; today's line 2 partly follows the trajectory of that horse line. Both companies extended their network, and lines were opened to Freihafen (1888), Hohentor (1889) and Arsterdamm (1880/1884).

=== Electric tramway ===
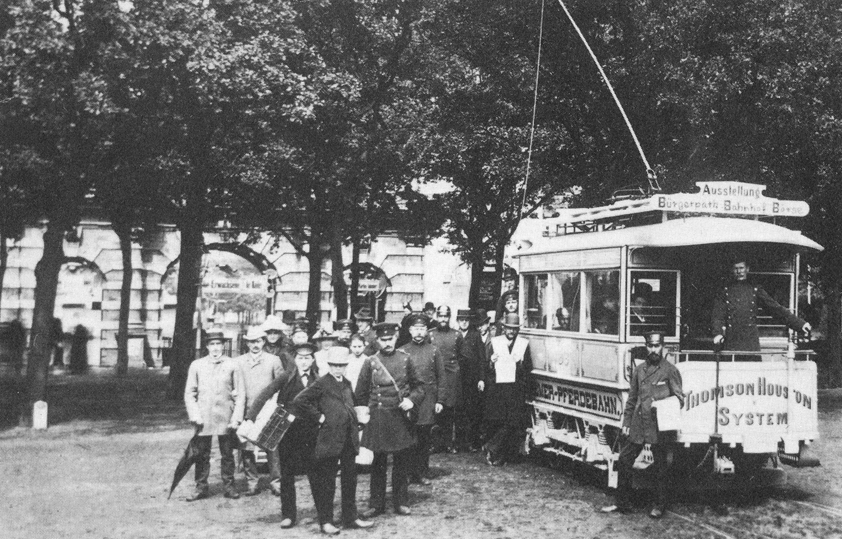
Initial tram service introduced in 1890 utilising the Thomson-Houston System

In 1890, the line from the Stock Exchange to the Bürgerweide exhibition grounds was electrified as a trial for the duration of an exhibition. Once the exhibition had ended, the overhead line equipment was removed, but the system had worked so well that it was decided to electrify all tramways. Electrification was implemented by Union-Elektricitäts-Gesellschaft, the German subsidiary of the American Thomson-Houston Electric Company starting in 1892. The network was fully electrified by 1913, with the exception of the Freihafen line, which had been abandoned by then. Meanwhile, Große Bremer Pferdebahn merged with the Bremer Pferdebahn (which had renamed itself as Bremer Straßenbahn in 1890) in 1899.

In 1908, line numbers were introduced. By 1939, the network consisted of the following lines:

- 1: Ringbahn
- 2: Gröpelingen - Markt - Sebaldsbrück
- 3: AG Weser - Markt - Hohwisch
- 4: Horn - Bahnhof - Markt - Arsterdamm
- 5: Flughafen - Markt - Bahnhof - Hemmstraße
- 6: Vulkanstraße - Brill - Bahnhof - Hemmstraße
- 7: Hartwigstraße - Bahnhof - Markt - Rablinghausen
- 8: Gröpelingen - Burg
- 10: Friedrich-Karl-Straße - Bahnhof - Waller Bahnhof
- 11: AG Weser - Norddeutsche Hütte
- 12: Sebaldsbrück - Osterholzer Friedhof
- 15: Hemmstraße - Bahnhof - Markt - Pappelstraße - Emder Straße (über Westbrücke)
- 16: Gastfeldstraße - Brill - Bahnhof - Wachmannstraße

The system suffered severe damage during World War II - tram services were abandoned on 22 April 1945. After WWII had ended, only 10% of the rolling stock was in working order, and 80% of the overhead lines had been damaged.

=== World War II aftermath ===
On 13 June 1945 the first tramways resumed operation. In the immediate aftermath of WWII, the Bremen network was split in two, as the bridges over the river Weser had been destroyed. In 1947, the two parts of the network were reconnected, and apart from the tram line over the Stephanibrücke, the 1950s BSAG network re-attained its pre-war extent.

In 1953, bus traffic was taken over by the BSAG. The new Flughafendamm workshop near Bremen Airport was constructed in 1959; in 1963 the head offices also moved to that site.

In 1965, the main passenger transfer stop was relocated from the Marketplace to Domsheide.

=== Bremen Tram Riots ===
The Bremen tram riots in 1968 (alternatively often referred to as Bremen tram riots or large student uprising) lasted from 15 to 22 January 1968 and were superficially against fare increases of the BSAG. However, they also reflected the youth's desire for more self-determination and the rejection of the Vietnam War. During the riots, serious violent clashes between the demonstrators and the police took place in the inner city of Bremen. Ultimately, the fare increases were withdrawn.

The Bremen tram riots were part of the nationwide '68 movement, which called for more participation and democracy in society, businesses and educational institutions, protesting against the authoritarian leadership of a rigid state apparatus that demanded more and better schools and universities and condemned the Vietnam War.

Also in Bremen 1965 and 1967 student demonstrations took place against the educational emergency. A Vietnam committee organized rallies and information sessions against the war. In 1967, the schools were more and more involved in these protest movements. To improve the self-determination of the schools existed the "Arbeitsgemeinschaft Bremer Schüler" (ABS) as an association of class and school spokespersons of all Bremen schools. In Bremen-Nord there were a number of students who were members of the German Democrats and also dissatisfied with the work of the ABS. Therefore, they met from June 1967 and founded in mid-November the "Independent Student Association" (USB), in which each student could enter. The activities were also directed against cases of censorship of the school newspapers, which - as the students demanded - should be run by themselves as responsible newspapers. Against the editor of the newspaper The echo of the Gerhard Rohlfs high school in Bremen Vegesack, Hans Jürgen Weissbach, was determined because of offense against the press law. In many cases, left-liberal teachers supported the activities of the USB. At the end of 1967, discussions took place at numerous Bremen schools on the Vietnam War, against the educational crisis, for school reforms, for anti-authoritarian education and against emergency laws. Rudi Dutschke, a representative of the German student movement and the Extra-Parliamentary Opposition, visited the city and gave two speeches.

On 23 December 1967, in Bremen, a large demonstration against the Vietnam War with several thousand participants took place. The demonstration moved through downtown to the US Consulate General. On the afternoon of Christmas Eve, the USB distributed leaflets in front of two churches, telling churchgoers to visit the "rich devotions" while "the war raged in Vietnam."

Triggers of the tram riots was a fare increase of Bremen tram AG (BSAG). At the beginning of 1968 it raised the tariffs for single tickets from 60 to 70 pfennig and that for trading cards for pupils, students and apprentices from 33.3 to 40 pfennigs. The student representatives then decided to defend themselves at a small gathering. Morally and logistically, they were supported by the leftist SPD Altstadtverein (OVA) and the then FDP-affiliated Young Democrats.

On Monday 15 January 1968, around 5 pm, a group of 25 to 50 students, young trade unionists and apprentices gathered on the Domsheide in front of the bell to demonstrate against the fare increase. This intersection was then as today one of the main junctions of the tram lines in Bremen. The young people distributed leaflets and finally got on the tracks to stop the trams. When the desired result failed, the group sat down to "sit down". Although the trams had to stop their journey and the urban transport in the downtown area collapsed in part, but after about an hour, the students were pushed by the police, and some were carried away. The students then continued their action on the station square, where they limited themselves to a demonstration without obstructing the tram traffic. Around 300 people took part in this event and the first minor clashes with the police took place. The city's politicians were initially surprised by these protests.

However, Mayor Hans Koschnick announced the same evening: "We do not let ourselves be blackmailed by the pressure of the road."

The next day, Tuesday, the 16th, the protesters received further inflow and soon gathered in the afternoon, a crowd of 1500 people, the signs with inscriptions like "70 Pfennig - I prefer running" waving. Again a sitting blockade was organized at the Domsheide at 17 o'clock. The backwash of the forced to stop trams and buses extended in the south to the new city and in the north to the station, which corresponds to a distance of 1.1 kilometers. The students had now joined numerous apprentices and students, who were also affected by the fare increase. Finally, the police intervened again, but the blockers were not carried away without resistance as the day before, but threw stones, firecrackers and paint bags. This behavior provoked a reaction from the security forces using a water cannon. When a large group of students attempted to storm the Domsheide, the police put this slogan into action and beat down the demonstrators with batons, injuring numerous bystanders. In a leaflet distributed throughout the city, the ABS distanced itself from the violent protests. However, this did not change the situation, as the ABS by most demonstrators was not recognized anyway. In the evening, the first reports of damage in the press offices of the local newspapers came in: the BSAG reported 21 damaged trams and sidecar of the tram and 14 damaged buses. At the same time, the police announced that they had made 94 arrests that day.

Violence on both sides continued throughout the following day. After the works councils of the AG Weser and Klöckner Hütte, the two then largest employers in the city, declared their solidarity with the demonstrators on the morning of 18 January, some 20,000 people gathered at the Domsheide. Railway tracks and entire streets in the Bremen city center were occupied and blocked, detonators ignited and slogans such as "Beat the cops dead" called, after which the police took 138 protesters into custody. Meanwhile, the Bremen Senate held a special meeting, which decided not to withdraw the fare increases and, on the advice of the Transport Senator, to release BSAG from its passenger transport obligation. The President of the Senate and Mayor Hans Koschnick (SPD), who had not held his post at this time for two months, agreed with the organizers of the student protest on a conversation on 19 January. The Senate Director Waldemar Klischies (SPD), who belongs to the more moderate parliamentarians, was responsible for this decision. After a brief meeting in the cathedral chapter house, he suggested this to the leaders of the cathedral following the advice of the parish pastor Günter Abramzik (called "Abrazzo"). Bremen Interior Senator Franz Löbert (SPD), on the other hand, had proposed that the tracks and roads be taken back by force.

The meeting took place on 19 January at 12 noon in the Bremen City Hall. Invited were representatives of the USB, the Student Union and the General Students Committee of the College of Education. In addition to Koschnick, the senator for seniors and mayor Annemarie Mevissen (SPD) and Rolf Seggel, the chairman of the board of BSAG, were present. The city officials reiterated their position to agree to the fare increase, as the city could not compensate for higher costs for the BSAG otherwise, but in so far as they wanted to check whether the tram could not be exempted from the road toll by the municipality. Following the conversation, Mevissen went to nearby Domsheide, where several thousand people were still demonstrating. She climbed onto a stray sand box and made a famous speech with a megaphone. The Senator explained the results of the trial and warned the students against re-using violence. At the same time, however, she also showed understanding for their situation. During the speech, 700 security and riot police with four water cannons stood ready to tackle possible riots. However, they kept in the background and were not needed.

The investigation committee came after conclusion of its investigation only to the conclusion that the police use against the demonstrators was decidedly too hard. Political consequences had the tram riots for anyone. Also often criticized by Bock and Polach remained in office. Criminally, however, the riots had an aftermath. More than 400 people were arrested during the five days, and in the days following the protests, the Bremen judiciary instituted 183 criminal cases. 17 of them were charged with assaulting police officers. Many were handled as a quick procedure. In most cases they ended up with recruitment or acquittals. There were, however, four imprisonments and 16 fines.

The fare increase of BSAG, which had been the cause of the Bremen tram riots in 1968, was finally withdrawn in mid-February. Nowadays this is commonly considered a success of the students and also Hans Koschnick formulated later.

Even weeks after the riots, talks, rallies and panel discussions took place at irregular intervals, in which all the main participants in the riots - the leaders of the USB, Senate members and police officials - took part and exchanged views about the riots and better prevention in the future.

The disturbances of the pupils and students were almost complete in the days after the speech of Mevissens. Already on 20 January, the situation had calmed down so far that almost all buses and trams were able to drive on schedule. Only on Sunday 21 January were still reported some small clashes between protesters and security forces from Bremen North. However, these did not jump over to the city center as feared. On the contrary, students at the engineering school even canceled a demonstration against police crackdown during the past week. However, this did not prevent the population from starting a discussion about the police's approach shortly thereafter. One of the first and most frequently repeated demands was that following the suspension or resignation of the police chief of Bock and Polach.

After that, the Bremen Parliament met in a special session; it decided to set up a parliamentary committee of inquiry to investigate and assess the behavior of the security forces. In addition, the mayor explained that the road toll, as discussed with representatives of the demonstration parties, would be lifted for the tram. As a result, BSAG has 650,000 DM more at its disposal each year and can now decide on the tariff structure. During his statement to the deputies, he said: "Youth has a claim to be heard. The state must also admit mistakes. " After the meeting of the citizenship announced Koschnick on Wednesday 24 January, the decision taken in front of about 4,000 people on the Domshof and regretted at the same time the events during the week.

The streetcar riots in Bremen in 1968 served as a model for several similar protests in the Hanseatic city, even though none of them reached the same intensity and the riots - if there were any - not in the least so brutally led.

The largest tram riots after 1968 took place in the winter of 1976/77. On 9 November 1976 BSAG increased the price for a single ticket to DM 1.50 and for tickets of ten to DM 8. In the eight years since the riots this has not been the only increase, but the highest increase). The protests began on 6 December with a major demonstration against school abuses, which also denounced the ticket price increase. During the event, individual groups blocked the tram tracks on the Domsheide and the station forecourt. These blockages were repeated in the following weeks, with clashes with the police security forces. Even on 11 February 1977 protests were still taking place in the run-up to the Schaffer meal. Ultimately, however, they were unsuccessful, as the fare increases were not withdrawn.

=== Line closures ===
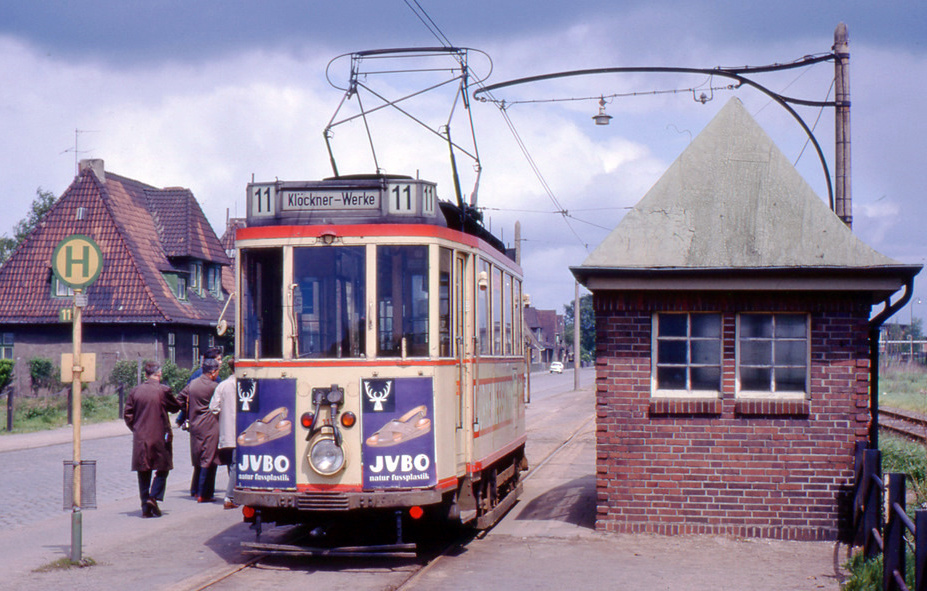
Line 11, closed 1970

Bremen, like other cities in the world, had lines close in the 1950s and 1960s due to increased use of automobiles. On the following lines, service was abandoned:

- Line 8 1949 (Trolleybus at first, from 1961 diesel bus)
- Line 12 1952
- Line 10 in St.-Jürgen-Straße
- Line 5 1964
- Line 7 1965
- Line 6 1965/67. The rails in Pappelstraße were used until 2001.
- Line 11 1970
- Line 4 1972, the section Kirchbachstraße - Arsterdamm had been taken over in 1967 by the new Line 1. The line reopens in 1998.

Lines 15 and 16 were renumbered to lines 5 and 6 in 1967.

=== Network extensions ===
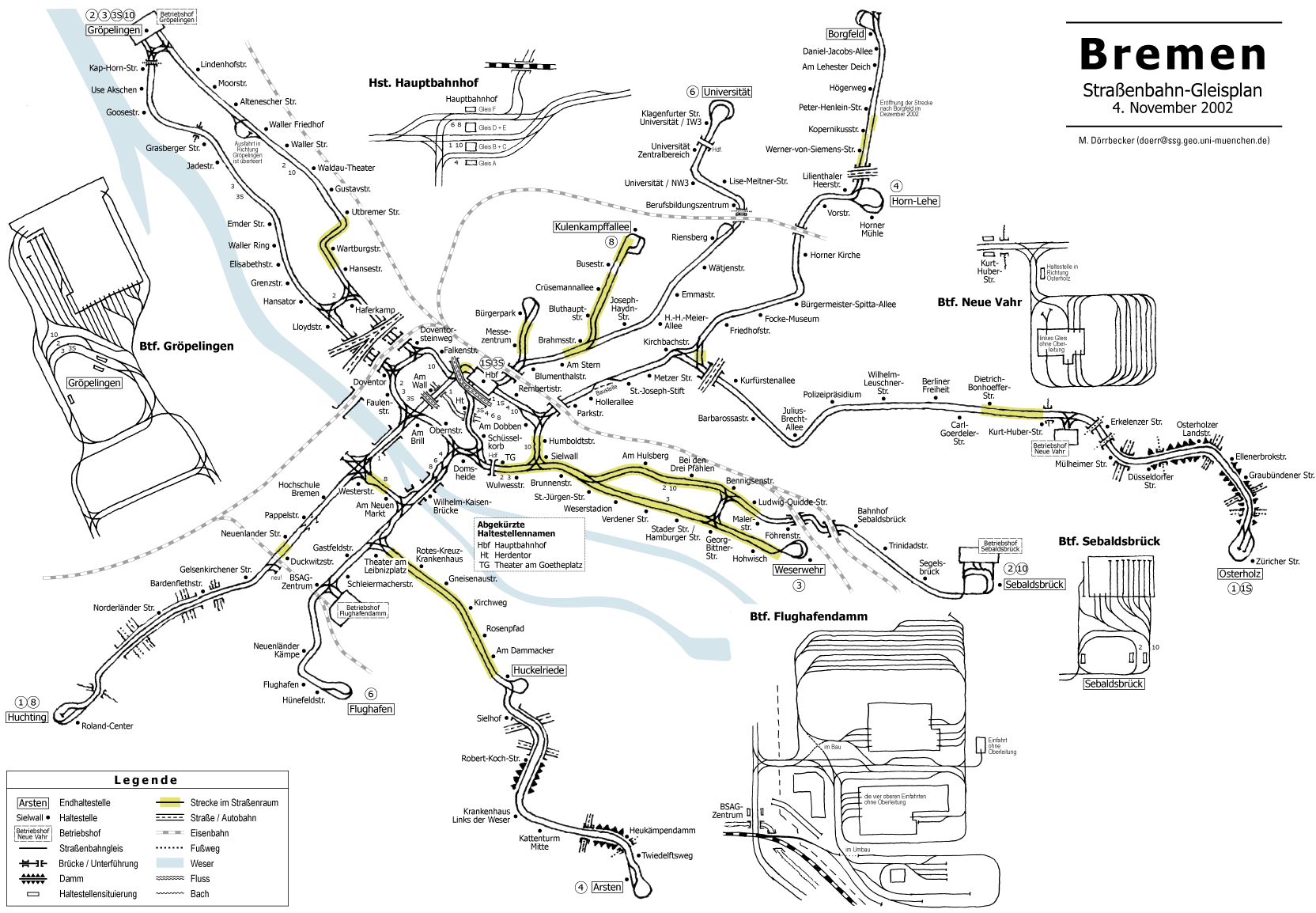
Track map of BSAG, 2002

However, some lines were also notably extended:

- Line 3 to Gröpelingen 1949
- Line 16 to Grolland 1955, from 1976 (then line 6) to Huchting
- Line 6 to Gastfeldstraße 1955 (closed in 1967)
- Line 16 to Riensberg 1959
- Line 15 to Kulenkampffallee 1960
- Line 10 to Georg-Bitter-Straße 1963, to Sebaldsbrück and Gröpelingen 1975. The rails in Georg-Bitter-Straße continue to be used by extra trains.
- Line 1; new line Arsterdamm - Blockdiek, extended 1968 to Osterholz, from 1973 to Arsten, renamed to line 4 and extended to Arsten Süd on 7 December 1998.
- Line 4 reopened to Horn-Lehe 23 May 1998, extension to Borgfeld on 6 December 2002.
- Line 6 newly built between Flughafendamm and Flughafen, replaces old part of Line 5 on 23 May 1998.
- Line 6 extension between Riensberg and Universität, opened 10 October 1998.
- Line 3 new route via Überseestadt, opened 2 December 2006.
- Line 1 extension between Schweizer Eck (formerly Züricher Str.) and Nußhorn, opened 26 March 2012.
- Line 1 extension between Nußhorn and Mahndorf Station, opened 2 April 2013.
- Line 4 extension between Borgfeld and Falkenberg, opened 1 August 2014

== Rolling stock ==
=== Current ===
==== GT8N-2 (Avenio) ====
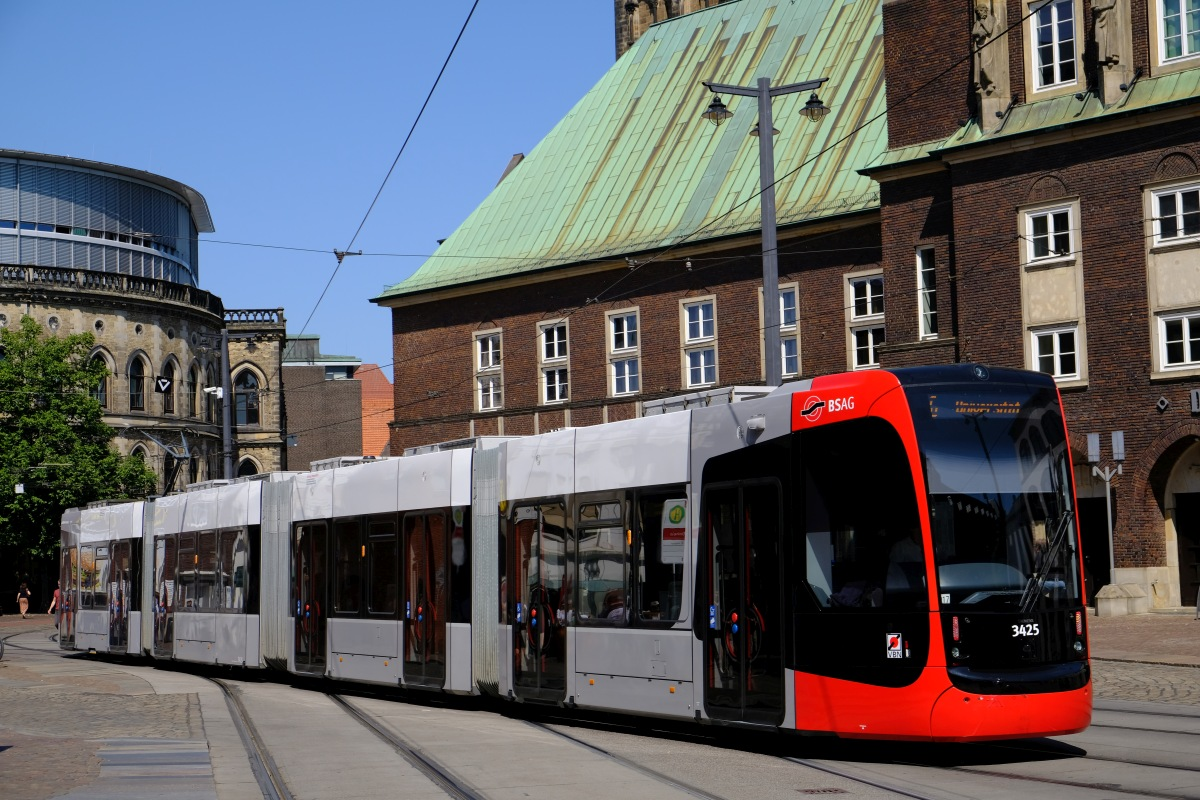
GT8N-2 Domsheide

Between 2020 and 2025, 84 trams of type Avenio from Siemens were delivered. Commercial use began in October 2020.

The serie is split into two parts. 49 vehicles with numbers 3201 - 3249 are used for tram lines. 3201 - 3229 were built in Vienna, 3230 - 3249 were built in Kragujevac in Serbia. Additional 35 vehicles with numbers 3401 - 3435 are equipped for use on tram lines as well as railway lines, which is needed for prolongation of lines 1 and 8.

==== GT8N-1 ====
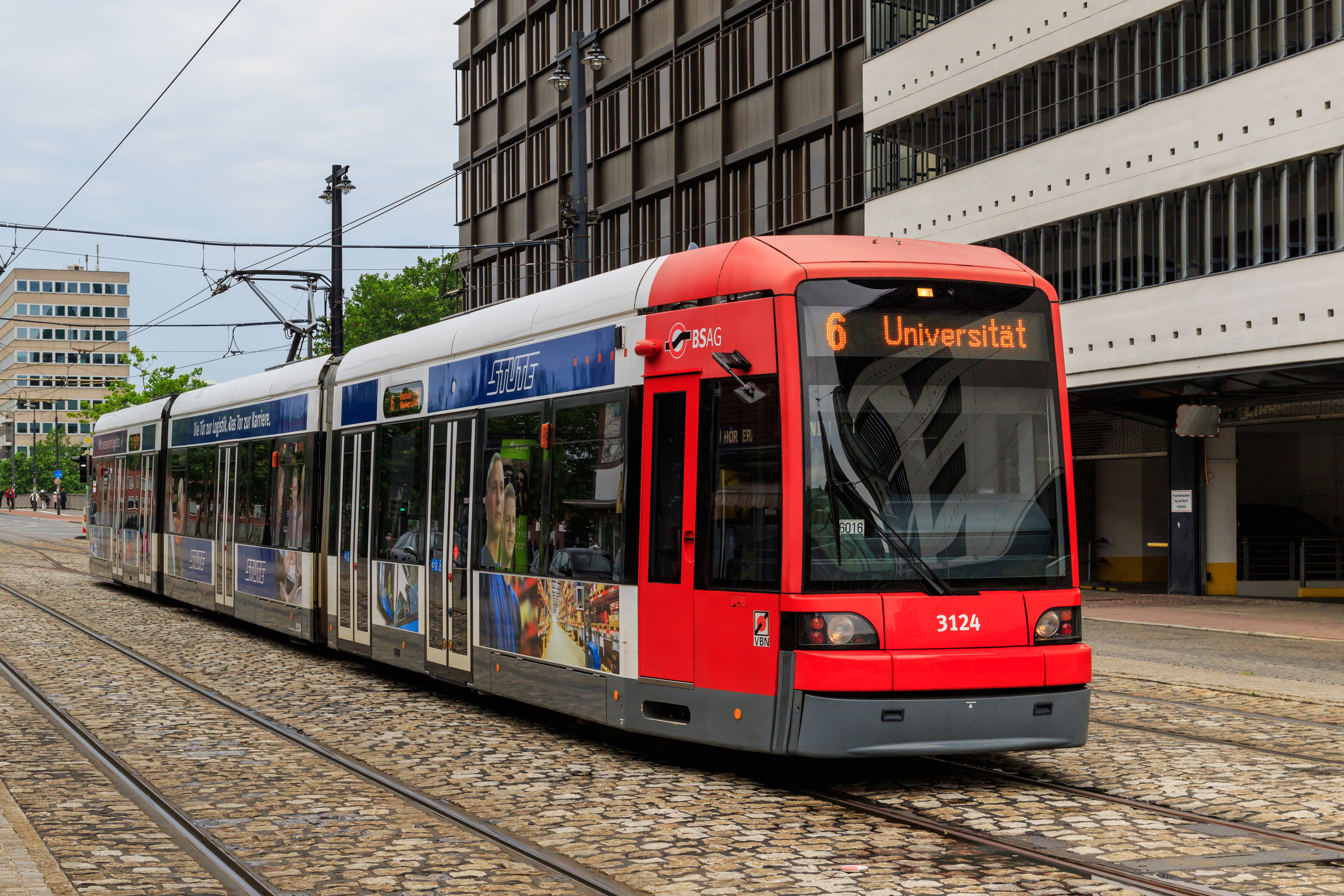
GT8N-1

Between 2005 and 2012, 43 vehicles were delivered from Bombardier Inc. The GT8N-1 is based on Bombardier's Flexity Classic modular tramcar concept. Vehicles of this type run in several cities in Germany as well as in Poland and Australia. The Bremen version is uni-directional for use on BSAG's tram network.

The GT8N-1 is the second generation of low-floor tramcars in Bremen. Its task was to replace older GT4 Wegmann vehicles and to provide increased comfort for BSAG passengers. Therefore, several changes were made compared to the older GT8N low-floor cars. The width of the car has been increased to 2.65 m, which makes the interior more spacious and allows the introduction of four seats abreast; altogether 106 seats are available. Passenger air-conditioning has also been installed, while five low-floor doorways and a lift for disabled passengers facilitate entry for all passengers.

The vehicle has an overall length of 35,400 mm and a maximum speed of 70 km/h. It consists of three sections with a total of four bogies. Two of these support the middle section of the car, while the two end sections are carried by a bogie each. The end section bogies are driven, which is why it was not possible to create a low floor above them as elsewhere in the car. Altogether the GT8N-1 is 74% low floor.

=== Earlier ===
==== GT8N ====
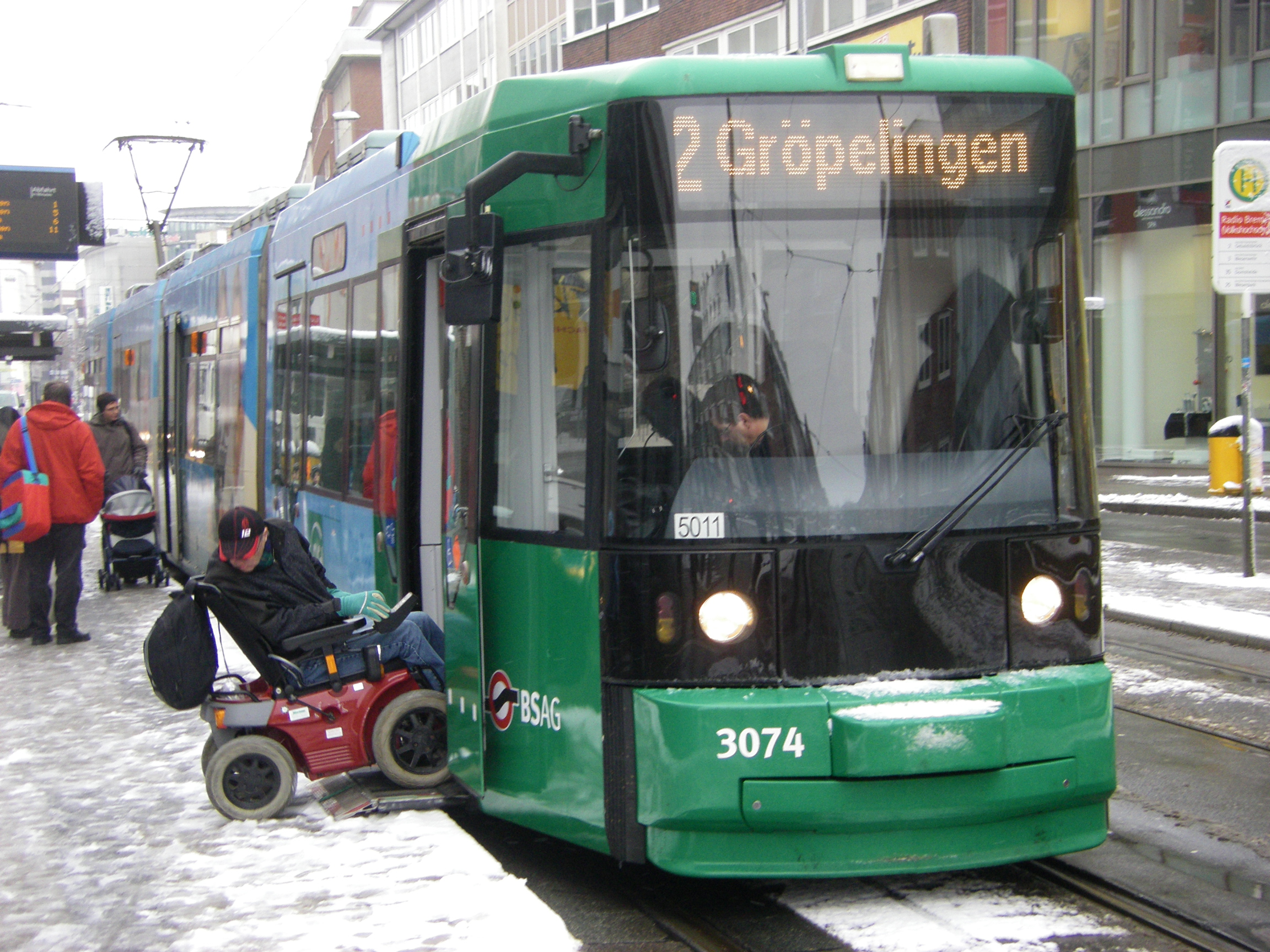
GT8N

From 1993 to 1996, 78 low-floor trams, classed as type GT8N, were ordered from AEG. Their main difference from the prototype is that they have four sections instead of three, hence offering more space and so more beneficial for wheelchair users. Between 2019 and 2025, the GT8N were withdrawn, and most of them were scrapped.

==== GT6N ====
In the late 1980s, the Hansa-built stock dating from the 1960s was scheduled for replacement. Since the BSAG had already invested in low-floor buses, low-floor tram vehicles were wanted as well. In 1990, the BSAG presented a prototype to the public. This three-section articulated car 801 was the world's first 100% low-floor tram. The prototype was sold to the Norrköping tramways in Sweden in 1999. It returned to Bremen in 2011 as a museum car (not ready for use).

==== GT4 ====
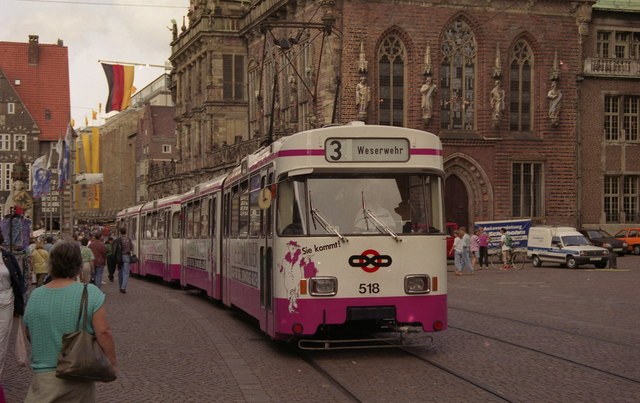
GT4d

The oldest vehicles in active service until 2013 were the articulated tramcars of types GT4d, GT4e and GT4f and the matching trailers of types GB4d, GB4e and GB4f. The vehicles were built between 1973 and 1977 by Wegmann & Co. in Kassel. Of the 61 trams and 57 trailers originally delivered, four GT4f vehicles are still in Bremen for special occasions. The rest have been scrapped or delivered to Timișoara in Romania.

=== Historic BSAG cars ===
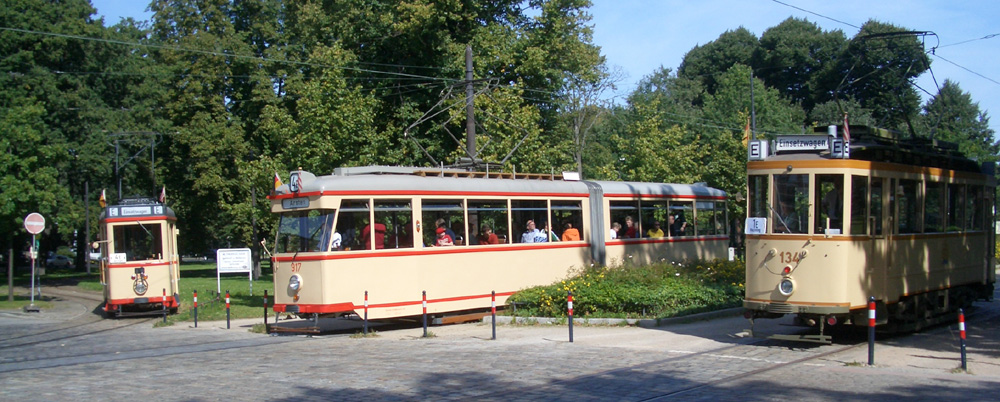
Historic BSAG cars from 1947, 1956 and 1904

In Bremen some historic tram cars still exist:

- car Nr. 49 from 1900 (the only car which is only allowed to operate without passengers)
- car Nr. 134 from 1904 (the only car not in original design, in the design of 1939, see picture right side)
- car Nr. 701 from 1947 (see picture left side)
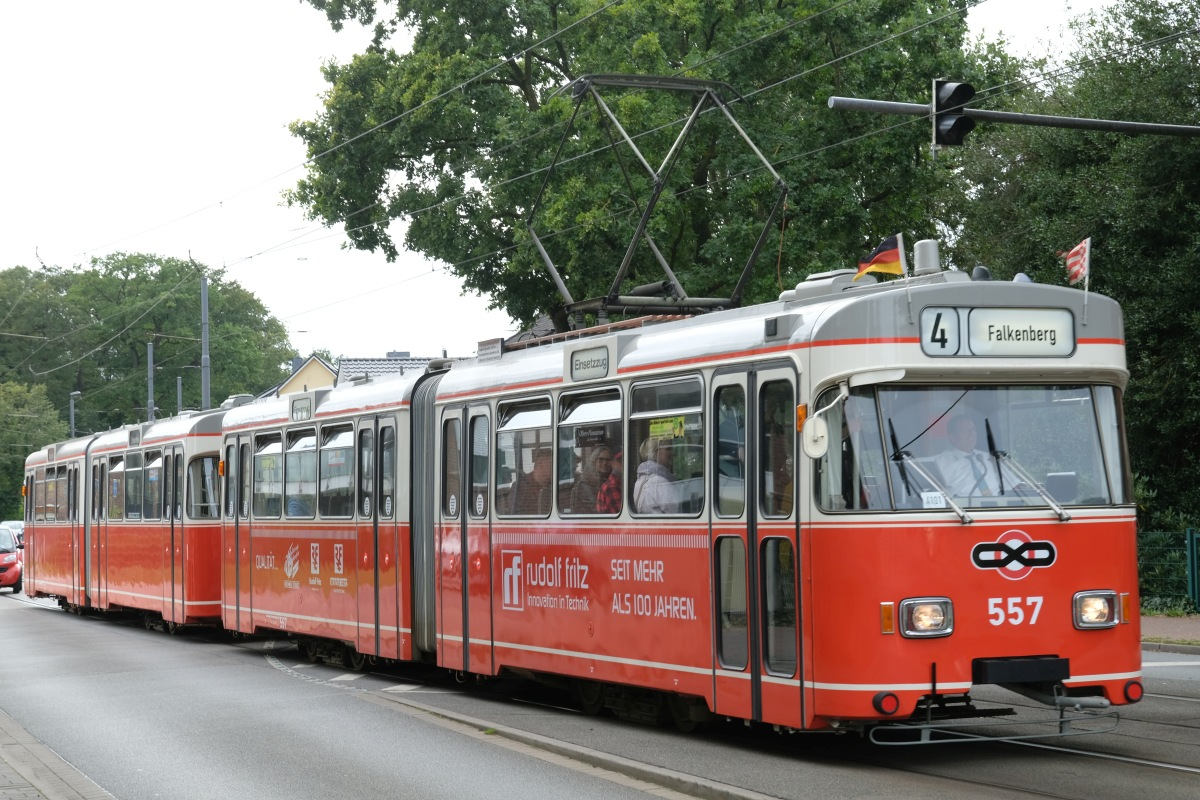
- Historic GT4f-GB4f
  GT3-car Nr. 917 from 1957 (special construction with 3 axles, see middle of picture)
- T4b-car Nr. 811 / 1806 from 1954
- GT4c-car Nr. 446 / 1458 from 1967
- GT4f-car Nr. 557 / 747 from 1977

== See also ==
- List of town tramway systems in Germany
- Trams in Germany
