= China Illustrata =

Book by Athanasius Kircher

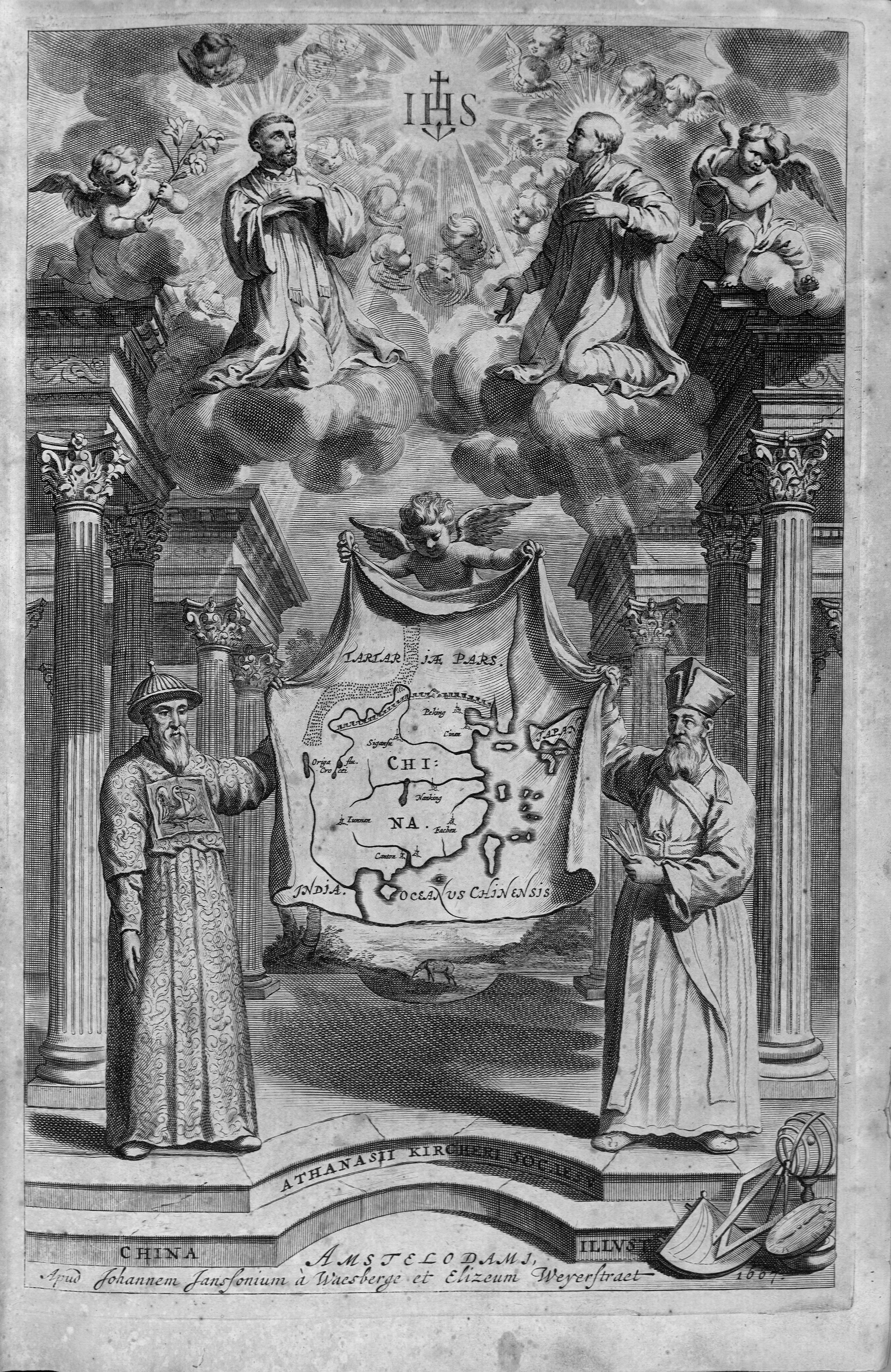
China Illustrata's frontispiece, depicting Schall von Bell and Matteo Ricci

China Illustrata (Latin for "China Illustrated") is a book published in 1667 by the Jesuit Athanasius Kircher (1602–1680). Principally drawn from accounts of the Jesuit China Mission, it compiles 17th-century European knowledge on the Ming-era Chinese Empire and its neighboring countries.

== Author ==
Athanasius Kircher was a polymath who published around 40 major works in the field of both the humanities and the sciences. He was based at the Jesuits' College in Rome, where he had access to many reports that Chinese-based missionaries sent back to the Jesuits' administrative offices. The accessibility to essential material, as well as Kircher's vast interest in Chinese language and culture, gave the impulse to present the then-unknown Eastern Asia in one comprehensive volume of 237 pages. The scholar was therefore considered an expert on China, although he had never visited the country.

== Publication and reception ==
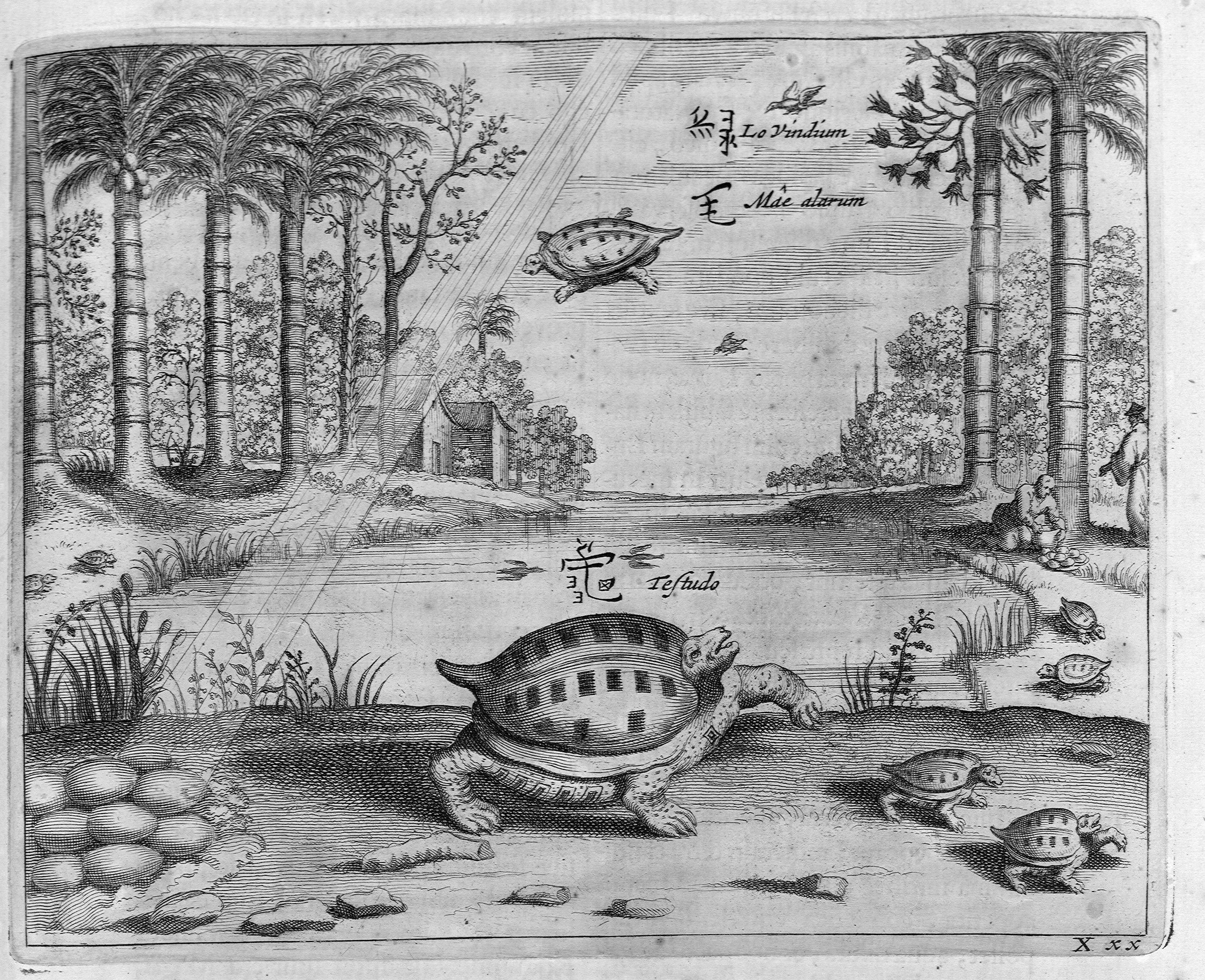
An illustration of Chinese turtles

Kircher himself had never been to China, but compiled the oral and written reports of former Jesuit missionaries to publish a summary of the knowledge on China and Tibet collected by Europeans in the 17th century. The work was published in Amsterdam in 1667 in two nearly identical and contemporaneous editions, using the same content, pagination, and illustrations. The first was published by Jacob van Meurs under his own imprint and the second was printed by him for Kircher's regular publisher, a house run by Jan Janssonius van Waesberge and Elizer Weyerstraten.

These initial runs were successful and China Illustrata was quickly translated into Dutch (1668), English (1669 & 1673), and French (1670) shortly after the Latin original had been published in 1667. The Dutch and French translations were both published in Amsterdam by Janssonius van Waesberge but, upon the death of Weyerstraten, cocredited first to his widow and then to their legal heirs. John Ogilby's English versions only included a greatly abbreviated treatment of Kircher's work in their appendix, being principally concerned with Johan Nieuhof's account of the first Dutch embassy to Beijing and the Jesuit Johann Adam Schall von Bell's rebuttal to some of its claims and aims. The work, however, awakened great interest in China and inspired numerous further English publications on far Eastern travels and discoveries. The French edition included a discussion between Ferdinando II de' Medici, grand duke of Tuscany, and Johann Grueber and also an early Chinese–French dictionary.

However, China Illustrata was also criticized. Gottfried Leibniz described the book as a work of entertainment rather than serious scholarship. Egyptologist Adolf Erman agreed that Kircher had written a book for the public at large rather than for scholars.

But others argue that China Illustrata was the first and most important writing to shape Western understanding and knowledge of China for over two hundred years. Indeed, it became one of the most influential and popular books of the 17th century and is even today considered "an important source of information on the beginnings of western sinology and sinophilism in Europe".

== Content ==
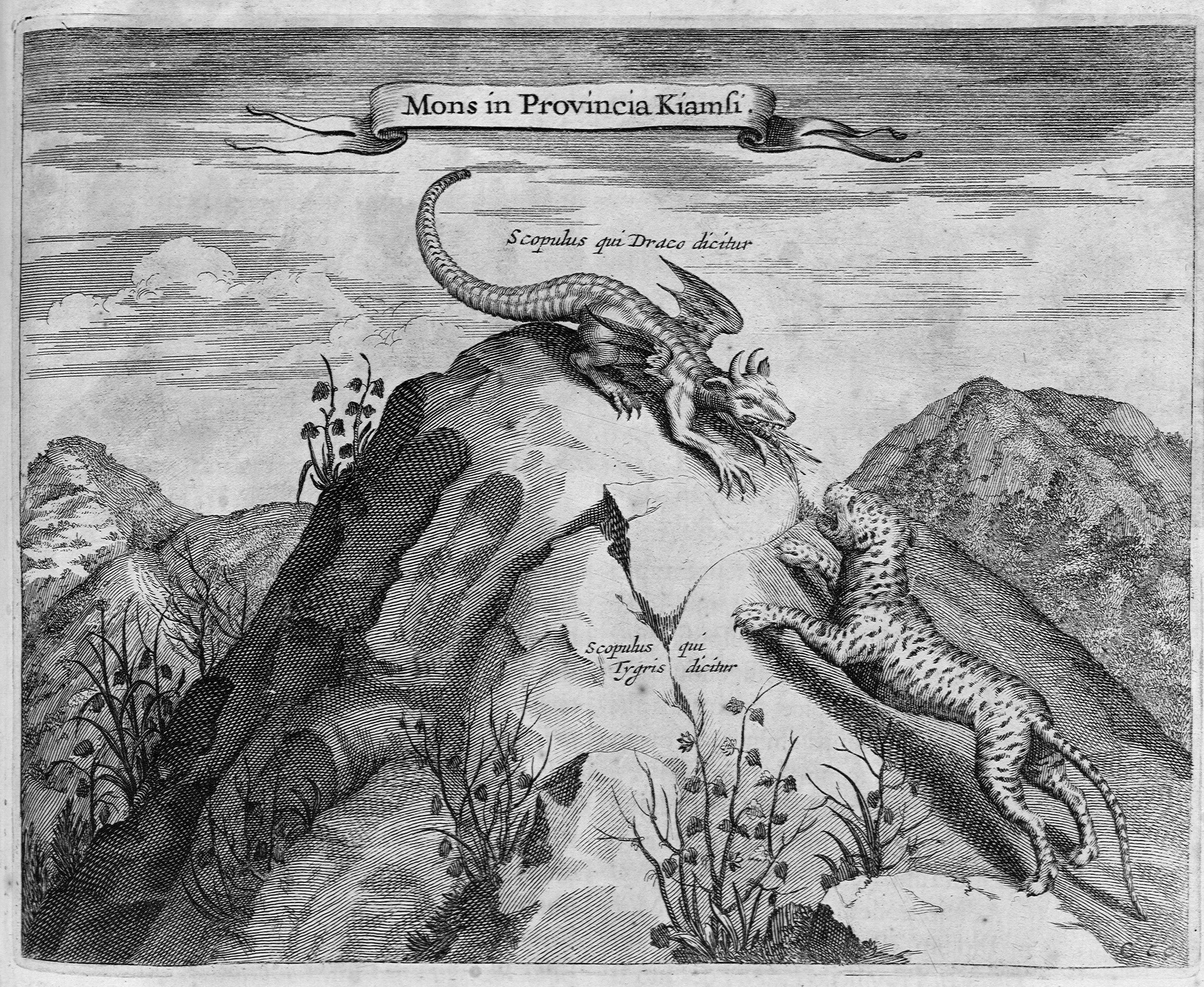
The Dragon and Tiger Mountain of Jiangxi Province (Mons in Provincia Kiamsi), combining topography with Chinese mythology

Kircher's work is an encyclopedia about the Chinese empire containing accurate cartography and illustrations that elucidate the vivid descriptions found in the text. The volume is a cultural account of China ranging from religious practices and social customs over languages to China's natural wonders, such as exotic plants and animals. By collecting and compiling information taken from fellow Jesuits including Matteo Ricci, Martino Martini, Johann Adam Schall von Bell, Johann Grueber and Heinrich Roth, Kircher achieves to create an authentic secondary study on Chinese people, nature and mythology.

There were several reasons for Kircher to write China Illustrata. First, he wanted to promote the missionaries' work and tell about the great journeys of Europeans in China. Second, he was also driven by his strong personal interest in Chinese language and culture. He collected Chinese objects for display in his museum, a cabinet of curiosities in Rome established in 1651 and named Musaeum Kircherianum after Kircher himself.

Apart from describing and illustrating foreign objects and exotic creatures, the book also dwells on relations between China and the Western world. Kircher connects Western, Indian, Chinese and Japanese idolatry and tries to prove the evidence of early Christianity in China. His work emphasises Christian elements in Chinese history, starting with the presence of Nestorians in the city of Xi’an. Kircher bases this assumption on the Sino-Syrian monument that was found there in the 8th century. In his interpretation, the inscription on the monument is a proof of the first declaration of the Gospel in China.

Kircher also declared that the Chinese script originated from the Egyptian hieroglyphs, since both writing systems were designed on pictorial principles.

=== Illustrations ===
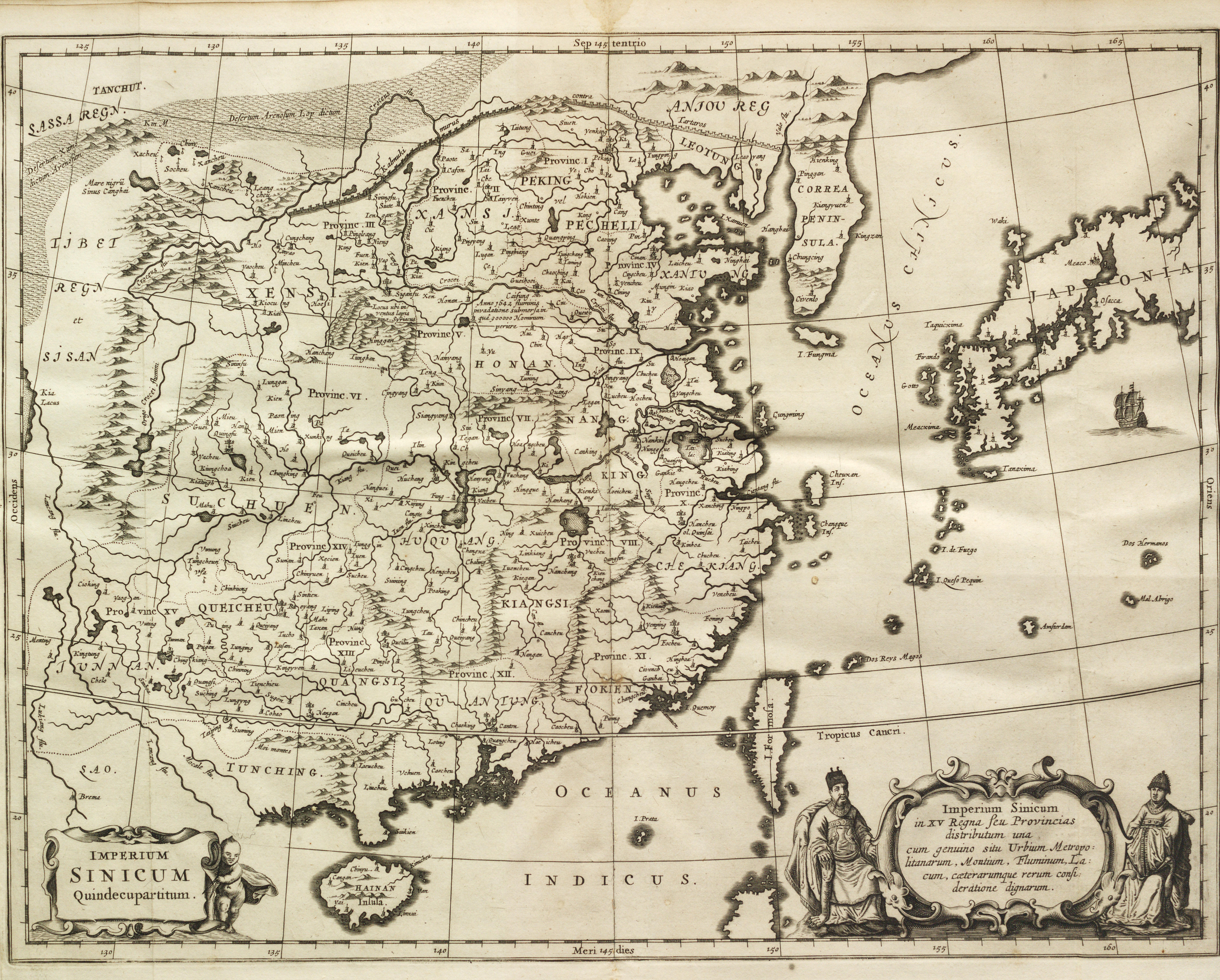
"The Quindecupartite Chinese Empire" (Imperium Sinicum Quindecupartitum), the work's principal map depicting the fifteen "kingdoms or provinces" of China under the Ming dynasty

The most important and interesting features of Kircher's book—especially at that time—are numerous illustrations of nature, rare portraits of emperors and Jesuits, and accurate maps of China of high cartographical quality. The illustrations of plants and animals are based on Michel Boym's Flora Sinensis and some of the images are derived from Chinese originals.

Illustrations play an important role in most of Kircher's works and they "have a quality of ingenuity and strangeness that are particular to his century". China Illustrata contains a number of realistic depictions of Chinese plants and animals, but also fictitious images, such as the "Dragon and Tiger Mountain". Although Kircher himself did not create most of the images, he chose them wisely in order to elucidate the descriptions found in the text.

=== Chapters ===
The book is divided into six sections:

Part One explains the meaning and significance of the eighth-century Sino-Syrian monument (42 pages)
Part Two tells about various journeys undertaken in China, including the Journey of Marco Polo (78 pages)
Part Three claims parallels between Western, Indian, Chinese and Japanese Idolatry (38 pages)
Part Four gives descriptions and illustrations of the flora and fauna in China (44 pages)
Part Five talks about the architecture and mechanical arts of the Chinese (11 pages)
Part Six is concerned with the Chinese language and its relationship with the Hieroglyphic characters (12 pages)

== Editions ==
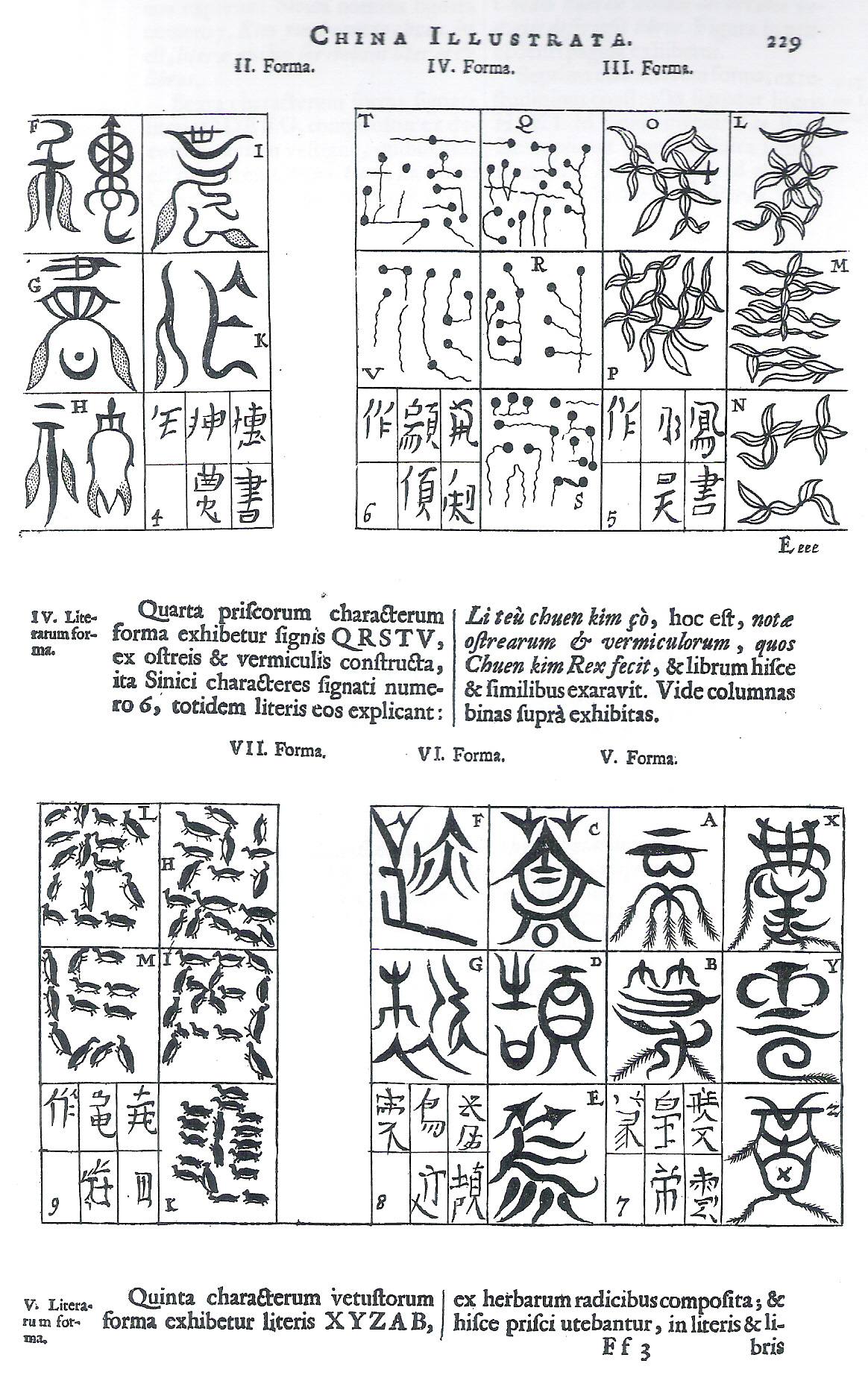
Kircher's attempt to explain the origins of Chinese characters, supposedly showing those formed by plant roots (the 5th type), small birds' wings (6th), turtles (7th), birds and peacocks (8th), and herbs, wings, and branches (9th)

- Kircher, Athanasius, China Monumentis, qua Sacris qua Profanis, nec Non Variis Naturae et Artis Spectaculis, Aliarumque Rerum Memorabilium Argumentis Illustrata [China Illustrated in Monuments, Some Sacred, Some Profane, and Also in Various Spectacles of Nature and Art, and in Discussions of Other Memorable Things] (in Latin), Amsterdam: Johannes Janssonius van Waesberge, Elizaeus Weyerstraet, & Jacob van Meurs, 1667.
- Toonneel van China, door Veel, Zo Geestelijke als Werreltlijke, Geheugteekenen, Verscheide Vertoningen van de Natuur en Kunst, en Blijken van Veel Andere Gedenkwaerdige Dingen, Geopent en Verheerlykt [The Stage of China, Revealed and Glorified by Many Noteworthy Items, Both Spiritual and Worldly, by Various Displays of Nature and Art, and by Evidence of Many Other Memorable Things] (in Dutch), translated by Jan Hendrik Glazemaker, Amsterdam: Johannes Janssonius van Waesberge & Sara Janssonius, 1668.
- An Embassy from the East-India Company of the United Provinces, to the Grand Tartar Cham Emperour of China, Delivered by their Excell'cies Peter de Goyer, and Jacob de Keyzer, at His Imperial City of Peking, wherein the Cities, Towns, Villages, Ports, Rivers, &c. in Their Passages from Canton to Peking, Are Ingeniously Described... Also an Epistle of Father John Adams Their Antagonist, Concerning the Whole Negotiation, with an Appendix of Several Remarks Taken out of Father Athanasius Kircher, translated by John Ogilby, London: John Macock, 1669.
- La Chine..., Illustrée de Plusieurs Monuments Tant Sacrés que Profanes, et de Quantité de Recherchés de la Nature & de l'Art à Quoy On à Adjousté de Nouveau les Questions Curieuses que le Serenissime Grand Duc de Toscane a Fait dépuis Peu au P. Jean Grubere Touchant Ce Grand Empire avec un Dictionnaire Chinois & François, Lequel Est Tres-Rare, & qui n'a pas Encores Paru au Jour [China..., Illustrated by Numerous Monuments Both Sacred and Profane, and by a Quantity of Research on Nature and Art, to Which Has Been Newly Added the Interesting Questions that the Most Serene Grand Duke of Tuscany Has Recently Posed Fr. Johann Grueber Concerning This Great Empire Along with a Chinese and French Dictionary, which Is Very Rare and which Has Not Previously Seen the Light of Day] (in French), translated by François Savinien d'Alquié, Amsterdam: Johannes Janssonius van Waesberge & Heirs of Elizaeus Weyerstraet, 1670.
- An Embassy from the East-India Company of the United Provinces, to the Grand Tartar Cham Emperor of China, Deliver'd by their Excellencies Peter de Goyer and Jacob de Keyzer, at His Imperial City of Peking, wherein the Cities, Towns, Villages, Ports, Rivers, &c. in Their Passages from Canton to Peking, Are Ingeniously Described... Also an Epistle of Father John Adams Their Antagonist, Concerning the Whole Negotiation, with an Appendix of Several Remarks Taken out of Father Athanasius Kircher, translated by John Ogilby, London: John Ogilby, 1673.
- China Illustrata (PDF), translated by Charles Don Van Tuyl, Muskogee: Indian University Press, 1986.
- Le Meraviglie della Cina: Un'Esposizione dei Prodigi Sacri e Profani, della Natura e dell'Arte e di Molte Altre Cose Memorabili [The Wonders of China: A Display of the Sacred and Profane Wonders of Nature and Art and of Many Other Memorable Things] (in Italian), translated by Biagio Santorelli, Bologna: Bologna University Press, 2015, ISBN 978-88-6923-037-0, OCLC 971545620.
