= Johann Grueber =

Austrian Jesuit missionary, explorer and astronomer

- Chinese: 白乃心
Transcriptions
Standard Mandarin
- Hanyu Pinyin: Bái Nǎixīn
- Wade–Giles: Pai Nai-hsin

Johann Grueber or Grüber SJ (28 October 1623 – 30 September 1680) was an Austrian Jesuit missionary who served as an explorer of China and Tibet. He worked as an imperial astronomer in China.

== Life ==
Grueber was born in Linz on 28 October 1623. He joined the Society of Jesus in 1641 and studied philosophy, mathematics and theology in Graz. he was ordained as a priest in May 1655.

He went to China in 1656, where he was active at the court of Peking as professor of mathematics and assistant to Father Adam Schall von Bell. In 1661 his superiors sent him, together with the Belgian Father Albert Dorville or d'Orville, to Rome in order to defend Schall's work on the Chinese calendar on the charge of having encouraged 'superstitious practices'.

As it was impossible to journey by sea on account of the blockade of Macau by the Dutch, they conceived the daring idea of going overland from Peking to Goa (India) by way of Tibet and Nepal. This led to Grueber's memorable journey (Dorville died on the way), which won him fame as one of the most successful explorers of the seventeenth century. They first travelled to Xining, on the borders of Gansu; thence through the Kukunor territory and Kalmyk Tartary (Desertum Kalnac) to Lhasa. They crossed the difficult mountain passes of the Himalayas, arrived at Kathmandu, Nepal, and thence descended into the basin of the Ganges: Patna and Agra, the former capital of the Mughal Empire. This journey lasted 214 days.

Dorville died at Agra, a victim of the hardships he had undergone. Jesuit Father Heinrich Roth, a Sanskrit scholar, substituted for Dorville and with Grueber carried on the overland journey. They travelled through Persia and Turkey, reaching Rome on the 2 February 1664. Their journey showed the possibility of a direct overland connection between China and India, and the value and significance of the Himalayan passes.

Biographer Richard Tronnier says: "It is due to Grueber's energy that Europe received the first correct information concerning Thibet and its inhabitants". Although Oderico of Pordenone had traversed Tibet, in 1327, and visited Lhasa, he had not written any account of this journey, while Antonio de Andrada and Manuel Marquez had pushed their explorations as far as Tsaparang on the northern Setledj.

Emperor Leopold I requested that Grueber return to China via Russia in order to explore the possibility of another land route through central Asia, but the journey ended at Constantinople as Grueber fell seriously sick. He was obliged to return to Rome and spent the last 14 years of his life as preacher, military chaplain and spiritual guide in the Jesuit schools of Trnava (Slovakia) and Sárospatak (Hungary), in the latter of which he died on 30 September 1680.

== Works ==
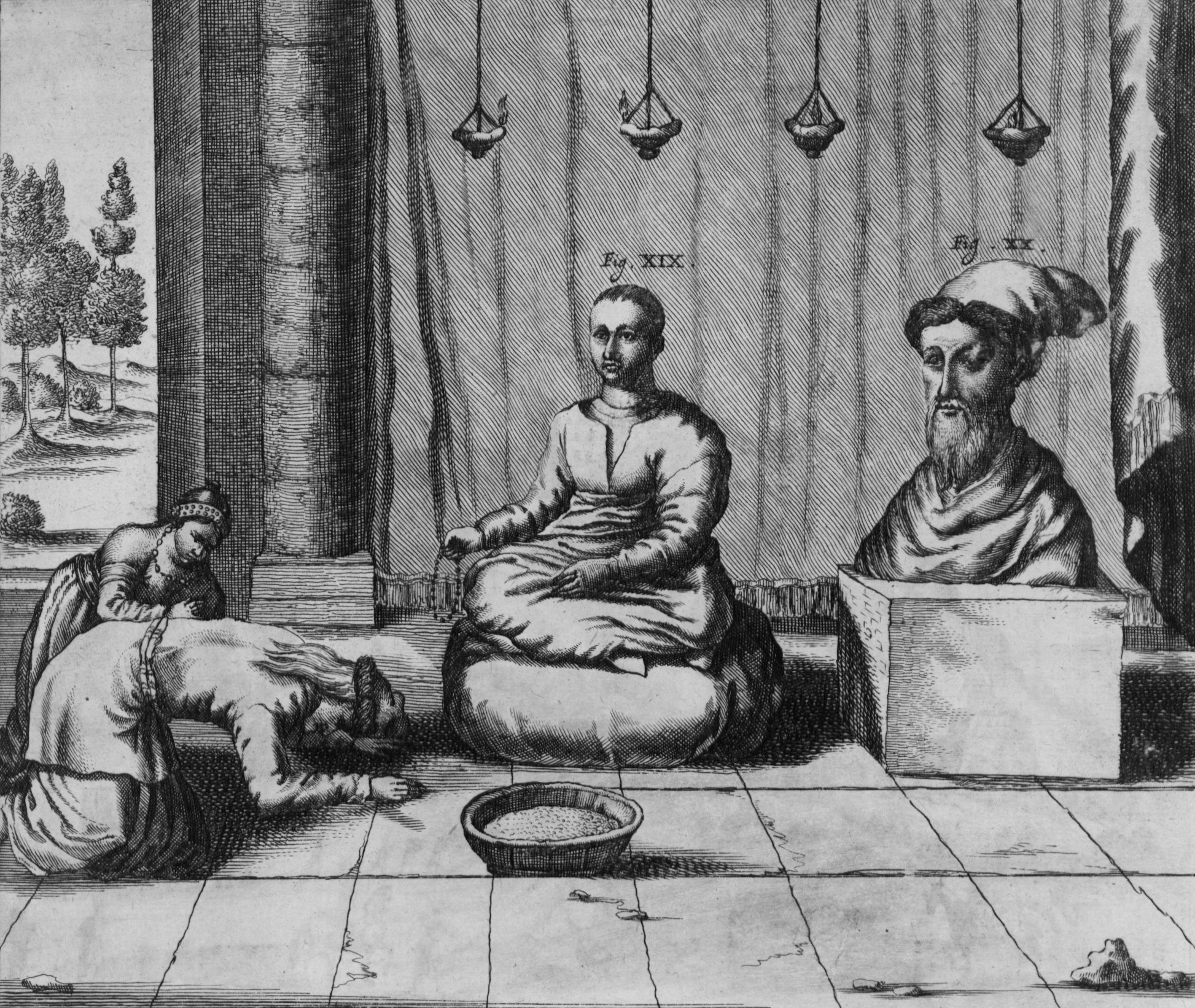
Statues of the Fifth Dalai Lama and (apparently) Güshi Khan seen by Grueber in the lobby of Dalai Lama's palace

Grueber left his journals and charts, with written additions to Athanasius Kircher, who published them in 1667 under the name "China illustrata"; the 1670 French edition of the book also incorporated a letter Grueber had written to Ferdinand II de' Medici, grand duke of Tuscany.

For other letters of Grueber see "Neue Welt-Bott" (Augsburg and Gratz, 1726), no. 34; Thévenot (whose acquaintance Grueber had made in Constantinople), "Divers voyages curieux" (Paris, 1666, 1672, 1692), II; extracts in Ritter, "Asien" (Berlin, 1833), II, 173; III, 453; IV, 88, 183; Anzi, "II genio vagante" (Parma, 1692), III, 331–399.

- Kircher, Athanasius (1667), China... Illustrata... [China... Illustrated...] (in Latin), Amsterdam: Jacob van Meurs, Johannes Janssonius van Waesberge, & Elizaeus Weyerstraet, pp. 64–67.
- Kircher, Athanasius; et al. (1670), Le Chine... Illustrée... [China... Illustrated...] (in French), translated by François Savinien d'Alquié, Amsterdam: Johannes Janssonius van Waesberge & Heirs of Elizaeus Weyerstraet.
- Magalotti, Lorenzo (1672), "Viaggio del P. Giovanni Grueber Tornando per Terra da China in Europa" [Journey of Fr. Johann Grueber Returning across the Earth from China to Europe], in Melchisédech Thévenot (ed.), Relations de Divers Voyages Curieux, qui n'Ont Point Esté Publiées, ou qui Ont Esté Traduites d'Hacluyt, de Purchas, & d'Autres Voyageurs Anglois, Hollandois, Portugais, Alemands, Italiens, Espagnols, & de Quelques Persans, Arabes, & Autres Autheurs Orientaux [Accounts of Various Interesting Journeys, which Have Not Been Published, or which Have Been Translated from Hakluyt, Purchas, & Other English, Dutch, Portuguese, German, Italian, Spanish Travelers, & Some Persians, Arabs, & Other Eastern Authors] (in Italian), vol. II, pt. III, Paris: André Cramoisy.
- "Autres Pieces sur le Suiet du Voyage du P. Grueber" [Other Pieces on the Subject of Fr. Grueber's Journey], Ibid. (in Latin).
- "Voyage à la Chine des PP. I. Grueber et d'Orville" [Fathers J. Grueber and d'Orville's Journey to China], Ibid. (in French).
- Voyage Fait à la Chine en 1665 par les RR. PP. Grueber et d'Orville Iesuites [A Journey Made to China in 1665 by the Rev. Fathers Grueber and d'Orville, Jesuits] (in French), Paris: Gervais Clousier & André Cramoisy, 1673.
- Magalotti, Lorenzo (1676), China and France, or, Two Treatises: The One, of the Present State of China, as to the Government, Customs, and Manners, of the Inhabitants Thereof, Never Yet Known to Us in Europe, from the Observations of Two Jesuites Lately Returned from That Countrey... The Other, Containing the Most Remarkable Passages of the Reign and Life of the Present French King, Lewis the Fourteenth, and of the Valour of Our English in His Armies, London: Thomas Newcombe for Samuel Lowndes, a translation of Melchisedech Thevenot's French translation of Magalotti's Italian original.
- Voyage à la Chine des PP. J. Grueber et d'Orville [Fathers J. Grueber and d'Orville's Journey to China] (in French), 1696.
- Magalotti, Lorenzo (1697), "Relazione della China, Cavata da un Ragionamento Tenuto col P. Giovanni Grueber della Compagnia di Gesù nel Suo Passaggio per Firenze l'Anno 1665" [Report on China, Derived from a Discussion with Father Johann Grueber of the Company of Jesus when He Passed through Florence in the Year 1665], in Jacopo Carlieri (ed.), Notizie Varie dell' Imperio della China e di Qualche Altro Paese Adiacente con la Vita di Confucio il Gran Savio dell China, e un Saggio della Sua Morale [Miscellaneous Notices of the Empire of China and Some Other Adjacent Countries with the Life of Confucius the Great Sage of China and an Essay of His Morals] (in Italian), Florence: Giuseppe Manni.

== See also ==
- Jesuit China Mission
