= An Embassy from the East-India Company =

An Embassy from the East-India Company of the United Provinces...
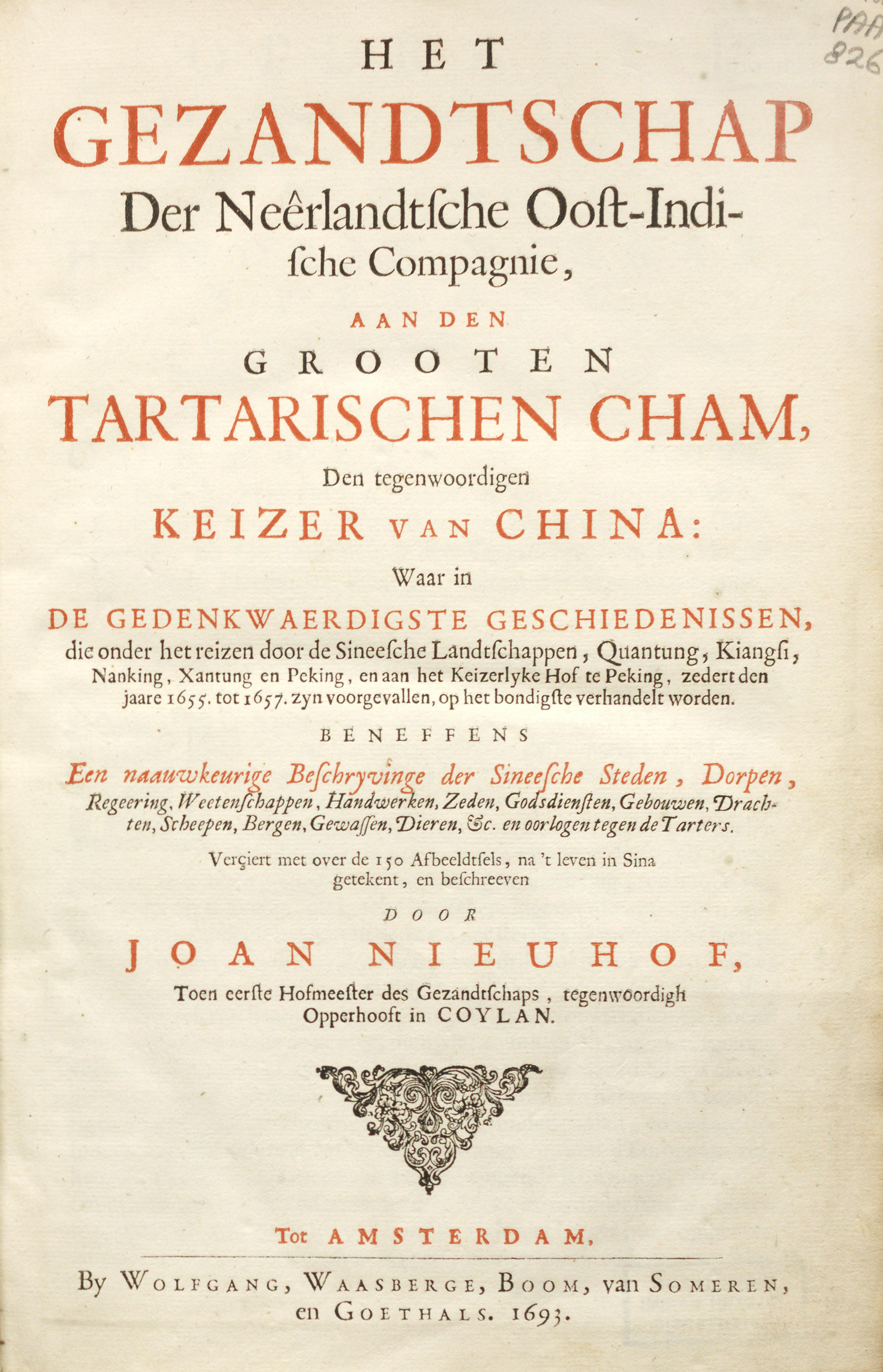
- Author: Johan Nieuhof
- Original title: Het Gezantschap der Neêrlandtsche Oost-Indische Compagnie aan den Grooten Tartarischen Cham, den Tegenwoordigen Keizer van China...
- Translator: John Ogilby
- Illustrator: Johan Nieuhof
- Language: Dutch
- Subject: China
- Genre: Travel literature
- Published: 1665 (Dutch & French) 1666 (German); 1668 (Latin) 1669 & 1673 (English)
- Publication place: Netherlands

An Embassy from the East-India Company of the United Provinces... (Dutch: Het Gezandtschap der Neêrlandtsche Oost-Indische Compagnie...) is a book written by the Dutch explorer Johan Nieuhof in 1665, providing a somewhat embellished account of the first Dutch embassy to visit China in 1655, 1656, and 1657. It was promptly translated into French, Latin, and German by the original publisher and then translated into English with some additions by John Ogilby in two editions in 1669 and 1673. Ogilby's translations included the Jesuit Johann Adam Schall von Bell's written rebuttal of the Dutch claims and aims, as well as a partial translation of Athanasius Kircher's recently published China Illustrata, based on other Jesuit accounts. Nieuhof's original account and its translations served as a major influence in the rise of chinoiserie in the early eighteenth century.

== Context ==
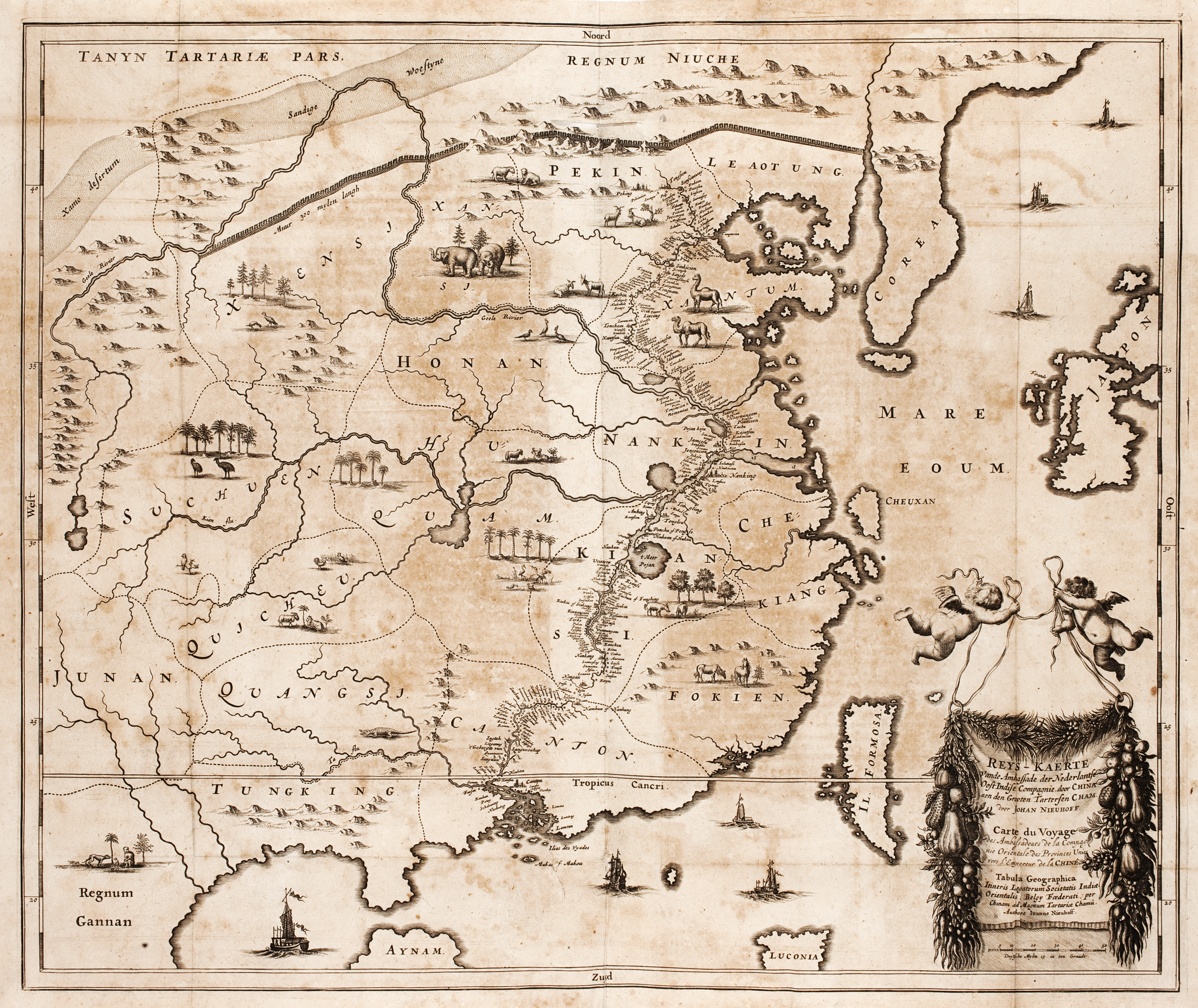
The main map of China from the 1665 Dutch edition, detailing the route of the VOC embassy north from Guangzhou along the North, Gan, and Yangtze Rivers and thence along the Grand Canal to Beijing

The book details the two year travel of the first Dutch embassy to visit China, from 1655 to 1657. The empire had begun accepting visitors after the start of the Qing dynasty, and the Dutch embassy visited with the goal of entering a trade deal on behalf of the Dutch East India Company (VOC). The Dutch were promised an audience with the Shunzhi Emperor. As the embassy's steward, Nieuhof was tasked with keeping an account of the travels of the embassy. In addition to keeping the logbook for the journey, Nieuhof also drew several impressions of landscapes, cities, and people, which were to be used as a visual supplementation of the account for the VOC.

After returning from China, Nieuhof gifted his notes and illustrations to his brother Hendrik Nieuhof, who collaborated with the Dutch publisher and engraver Jacob van Meurs. Nieuhof left shortly thereafter, leaving the entire publication process in the hands of the publisher. Van Meurs turned Nieuhof's notes into a story, and the illustrations into copper engravings for printing. In 1665, almost ten years after the embassy visit to China, the first edition of Het Gezantschap in Dutch was published.

Despite its claim of being true to life, it has been indicated by Falkenburg and Blussé that this was not the case. Their research points out the differences between the illustrations from Nieuhof's An Embassy of the Dutch East-India Company with Nieuhof's original sketches drawn during his time in China, which were rediscovered in the private collection of Roland Bonaparte in 1976 after being lost for four centuries. The published version of the travel account added illustrations (from 68 sketches in Nieuhof's notes to 149 illustrations in the published version) and changed sceneries to seem more exotic by adding exotic plants, pagodas and people with umbrella's. The written text was also edited, embellishing the travels.

== Content ==
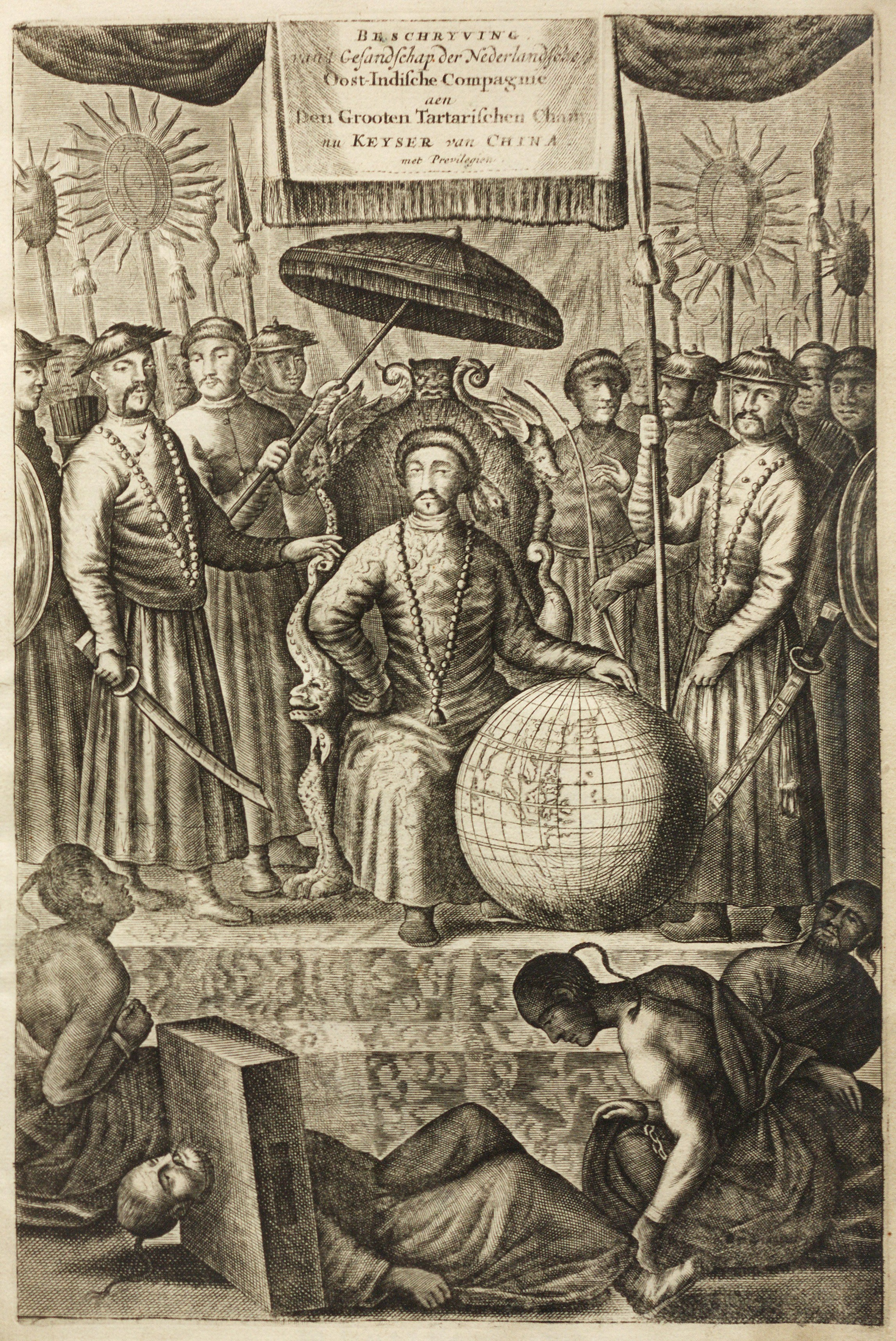
The frontispiece of the 1693 reprint of the Dutch edition, depicting a prisoner in the cangue (Chinese pillory) before the Qing emperor Shunzhi beneath his ceremonial parasol.

The book consists of the notes and illustrations that Nieuhof made in his position as a steward on Pieter de Goyer and Jacob de Keizer's embassy to the emperor of China. These notes and illustrations were left in the care of his brother Hendrik, "so as they not fall prey to rugged seas and hollow waves". This manuscript was eventually bundled and published to form this book, containing a written account of the embassy as well as 149 illustrations.

The book is split into two parts, the first of which details the journey of the embassy from Batavia to Beijing led by Pieter de Goyer and Jacob de Keizer to the emperor of China. This part also contains descriptions and depictions of all that the embassy came to pass on its trip. This part contains 69 cityscapes drawn from the perspective of the ship, 20 detailed illustrations of architectural structures, and 9 illustrations of Chinese people and culture.

In addition to the illustrations, the first part provides a written account of the experiences of the Dutch in China, discussing their encounters with the Chinese and the "Tartars", their experiences in the empire, and commercial interests such as trading, wages, and exotic merchandise.

The second part of the book serves as a general description of the empire of China. It provides information on the language, craftsmanship, culture, customs, fashion, religion and the natural world. The written account is supplemented with illustrations of the people, animals, and plants of China. This part contains 13 depictions of Chinese people from all classes, 13 etches of Chinese flora and fauna, depictions of Buddhist temples and deities, as well as several architectural structures.

In total, the account contains 149 illustrations, an unusually high number for 17th century books. Printing images was still far more expensive than written text, as it required copper etchings to be created and carefully printed in the books. Most travel accounts produced in this time would feature only a handful of images.

== Publication history ==
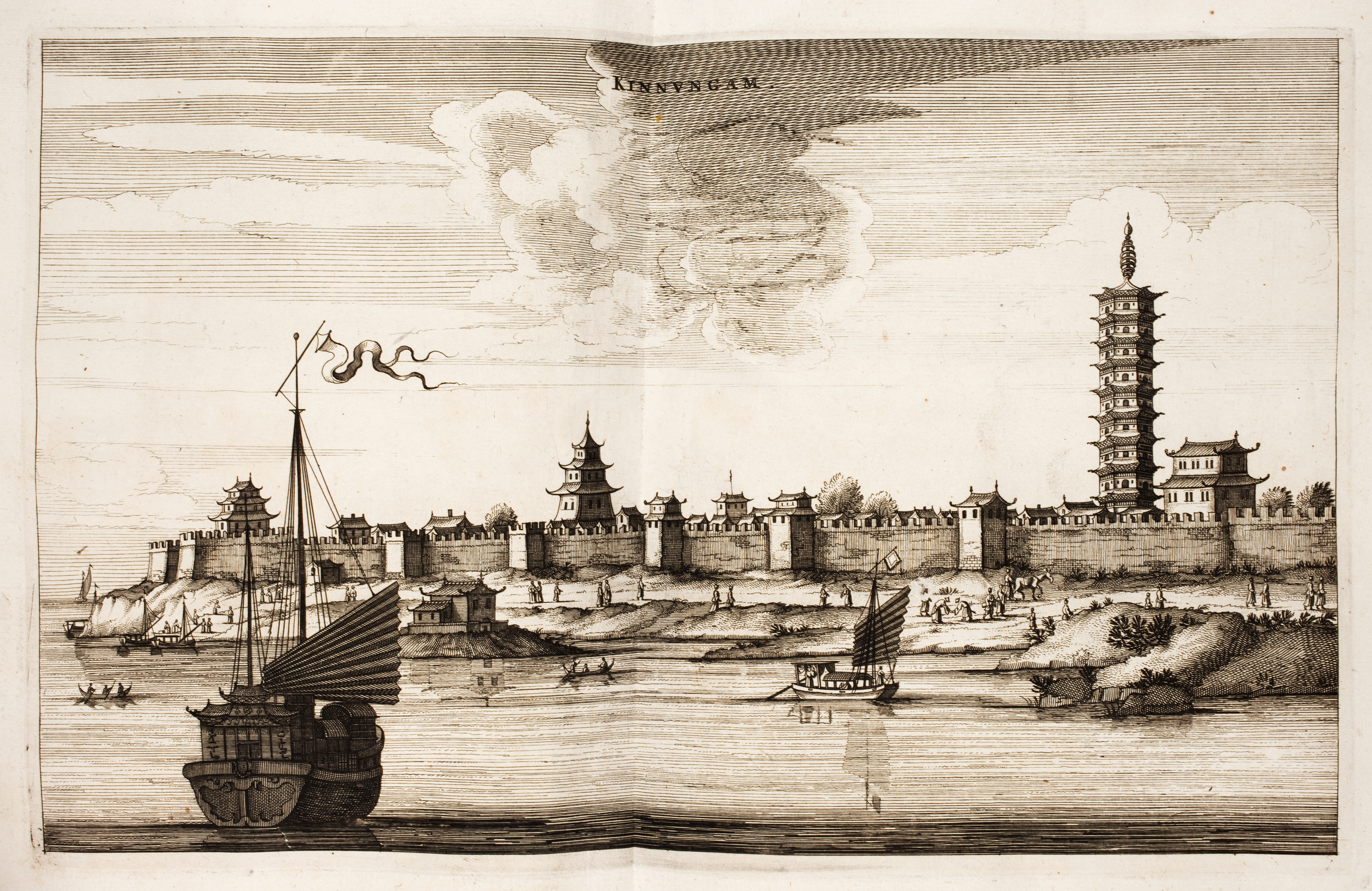
Ji'an as approached by river, from the 1665 French edition

The book was first published in Dutch by the Amsterdam-based publisher and engraver Jacob van Meurs in 1665. After its initial publication, the book was translated into multiple languages.

- French, published in 1665
- German, published in 1666
- Latin, published in 1668
- English, published in 1669 and 1673

The initial titles were extremely long. The Dutch title is conventionally abbreviated to Het Gezantschap or Het Gezantschap aan den grooten Tartarische Cham and the English title to An Embassy from the East-India Company. The German and Latin titles distinguished the entourage as a legation, rather than a full embassy.

The French, German, and Latin versions of the book were all published by Van Meurs. These versions are not merely translated, their contents were heavily edited as well. Depending on the translation, the book focuses more heavily on certain aspects (for example religion), whilst leaving other parts out, depending on the culture and biases of the intended audiences. The publications were heavily edited, geared towards commercial interests of the publisher. The anonymous introduction added to the Latin edition, relating details from the travels of Marco Polo, was probably composed by Jacob Golius.

The English translation was the only one not published by Van Meurs, and was instead published by John Ogilby. This version also includes excerpts from Athanasius Kircher's China Illustrata, a work chiefly compiled from accounts by the Jesuit China Mission, as well as an epistle of "John Adams", the Jesuit Johann Adam Schall von Bell, opposing the aims of the Dutch mission.

== Reception ==
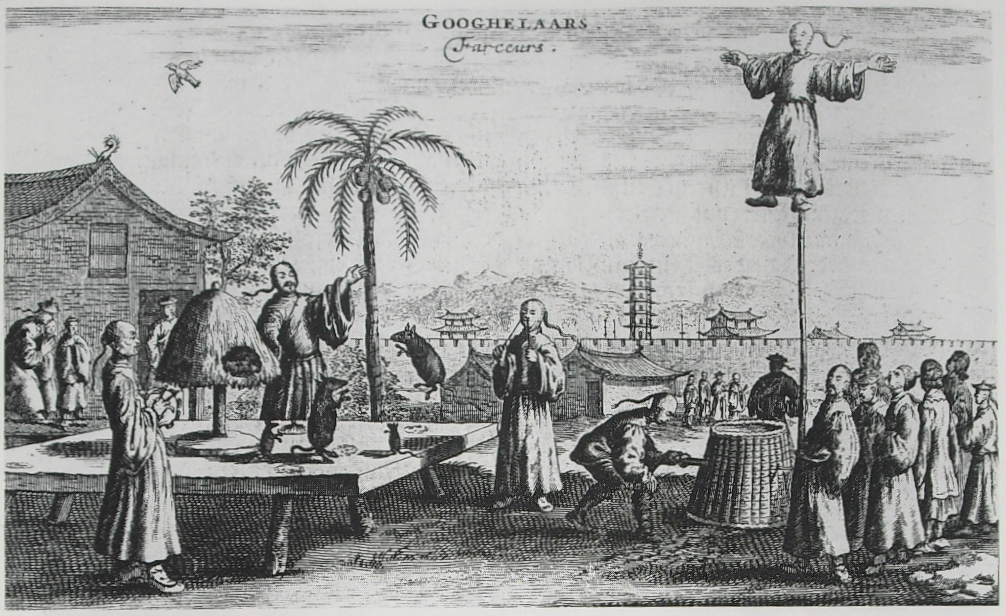
Etching of Chinese googhelaars ("magicians") from the 1665 Dutch edition

Travel literature had become a significant public interest in the 17th century. With the global trade enterprises, and the increase in knowledge of the non-western world, these works became a way for the people at home to feel like they were traveling the world. This was paired with an increase in literacy and a larger middle class, resulting from the economical flourishing of Western countries, and the printing of books becoming cheaper because of advancements in the technology of the printing press. For these reasons, as well as the novelty of the subject and the illustrations in the book, Het Gezantschap was very successful, and became one most popular travel books on China in the 17th century.

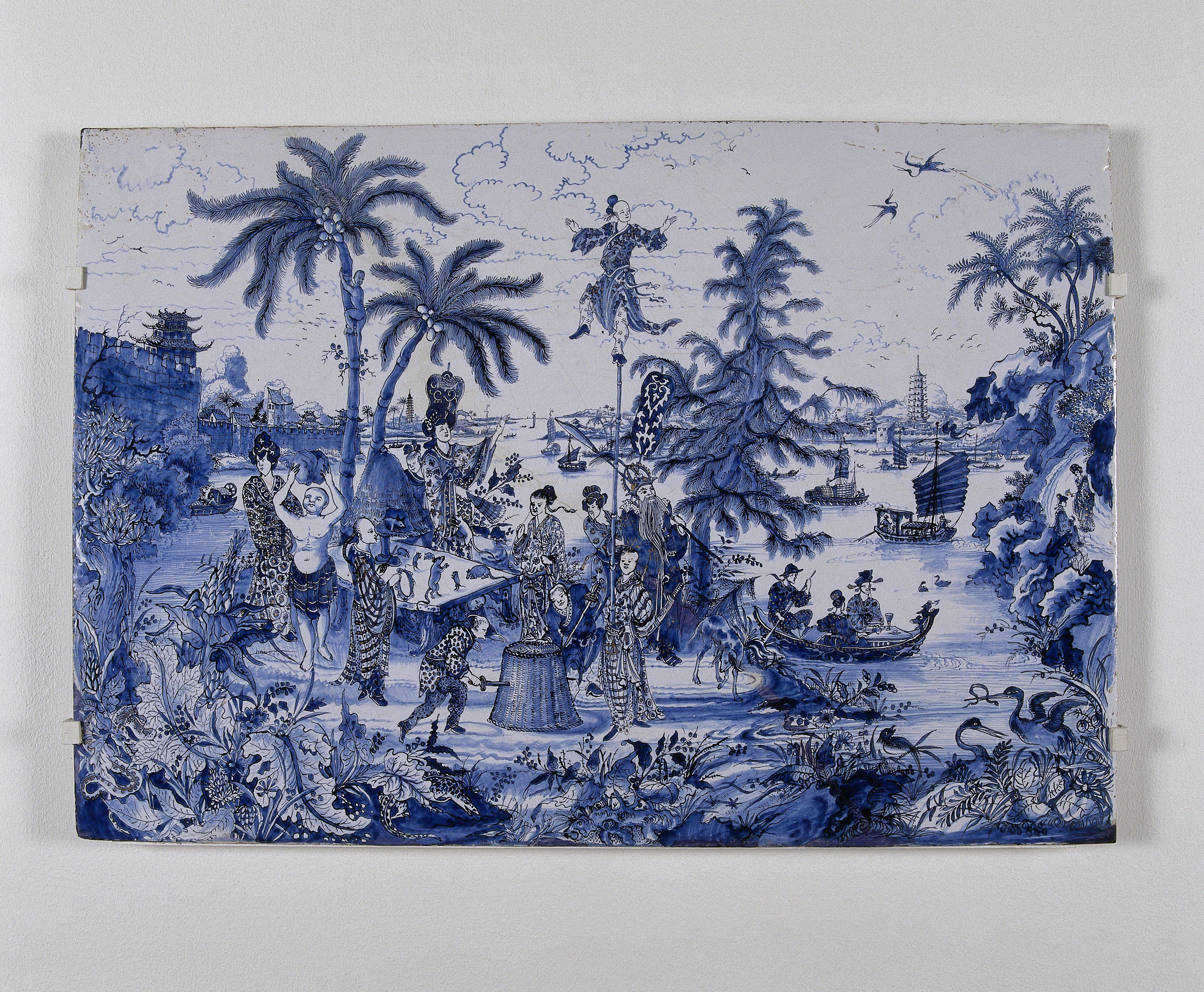
Delftware porcelain plate decorated with a version of the googhelaars image from Nieuhof's work

Within the genre of travel writing, Het Gezantschap was an especially sought-after book. With information on China being sparse because of its previous inaccessibility, Nieuhof's travel account provided information on a new culture and land. The book is generally considered the first visual account of China created by a Western authoritative figure. Prior accounts of China had been supplemented with visual reference material after the fact, and often featured mythological and fantastical creatures. Nieuhof's travel account claimed to be "true to life" (na het leven). Though this claim has been proven false, the sketches made by Nieuhof still featured elements drawn directly from observation.

After the publication of the book, Van Meurs went on to publish another book about China. Together with the author Olfert Dapper, he published Gedenkwaerdig bedryf der Nederlandsche Oost-Indische Maetschappye, op de kuste en in het Keizerrijk van Taising of Sina. The lithographies used to print the illustrations in An Embassy from the East-India Company were re-used in Dapper's account. A number of other works on China also re-used imagery from Nieuhof's travel account.

Two months after giving his notes to his brother Hendrik, Nieuhof left on another journey for the VOC. He traveled to the Dutch East Indies, on another diplomatic mission. After this, he remained most of his life abroad, in the East Indies, Ceylon, and Batavia. Nieuhof never visited China again in his life, but two other books with his notes and sketches were published after his death. One about Brazil, where he had worked for 9 years before the embassy visit to China, and another about the Dutch East Indies.

=== Chinoiserie ===
As it provided the first realistic visual representation of China, Nieuhof's travel account is considered one of the biggest influence on Western chinoiserie. Depictions of China were copied from the book and incorporated in Delftware porcelain, tapestries, wallpapers and paintings. This artistic movement was especially famous in France and Great Britain, but had gained popularity all over Western-Europe.

Impressions copied from Het Gezantschap can be found on many Chinoiserie works from the 1660s onwards, with artists often combining multiple cityscapes, characters and scenes from different illustrations.

== Editions ==
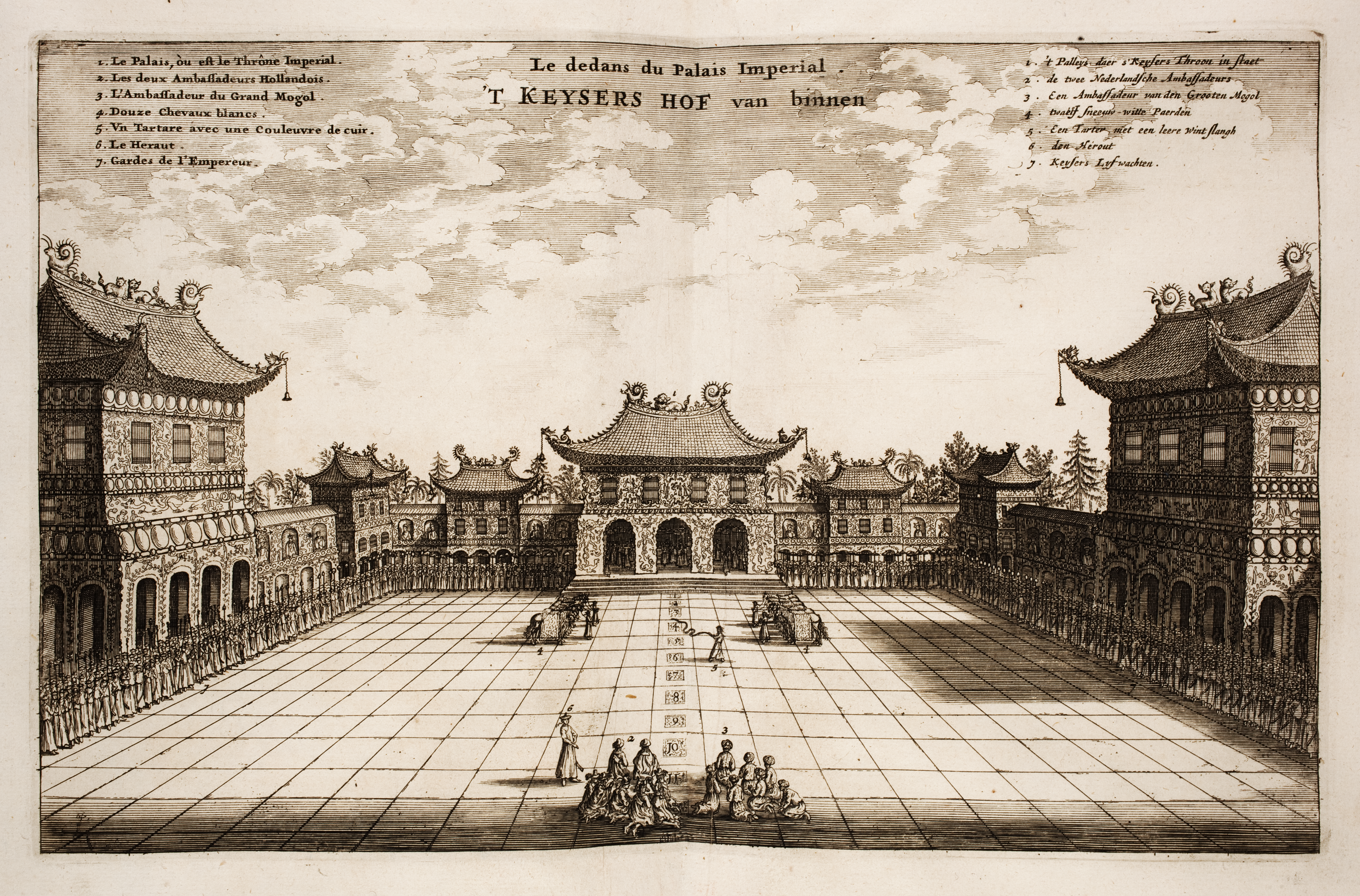
The Forbidden City in Beijing, as depicted in the 1665 French edition.

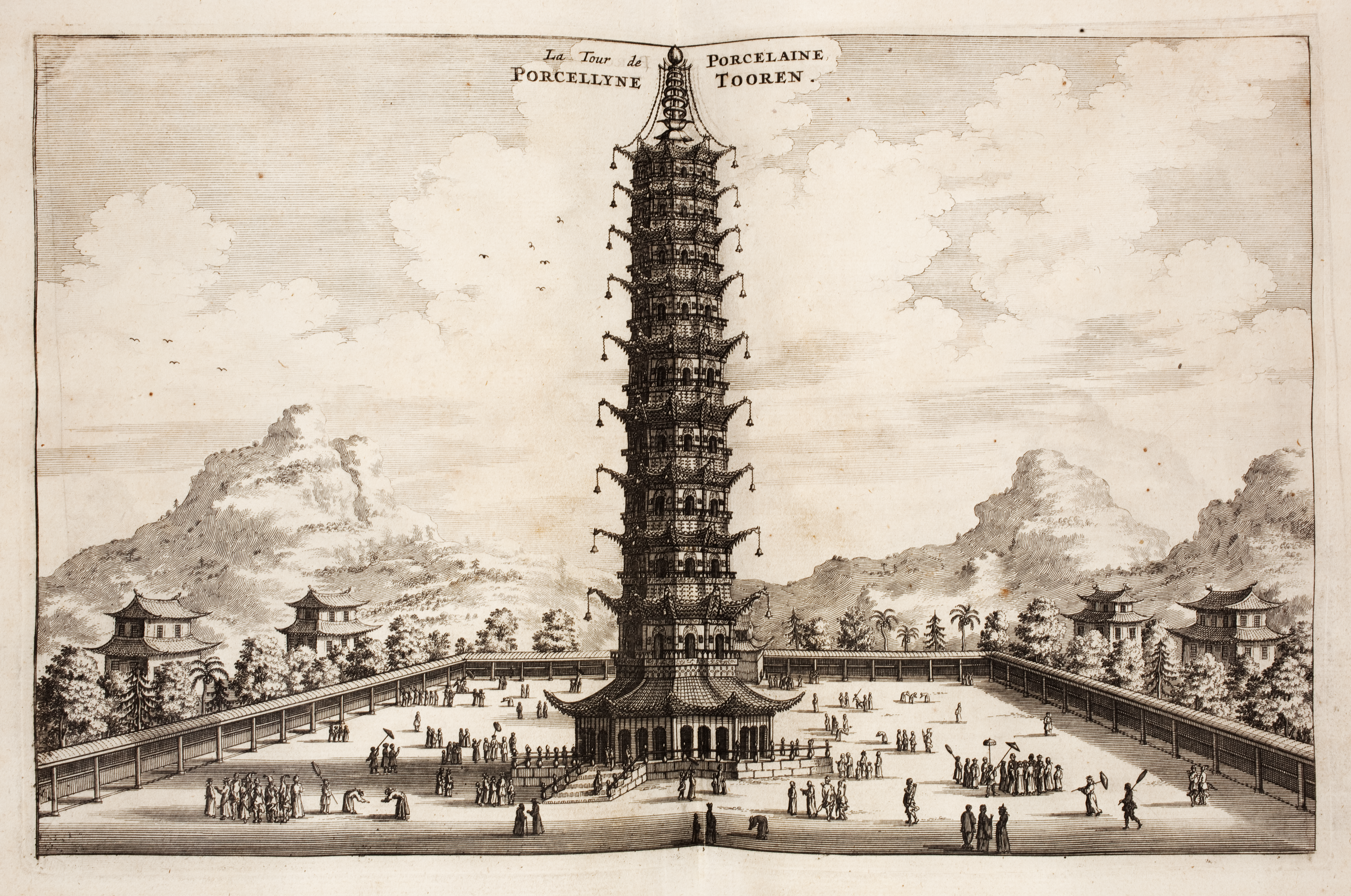
Nanjing's Porcelain Pagoda, as depicted in the 1665 French edition.

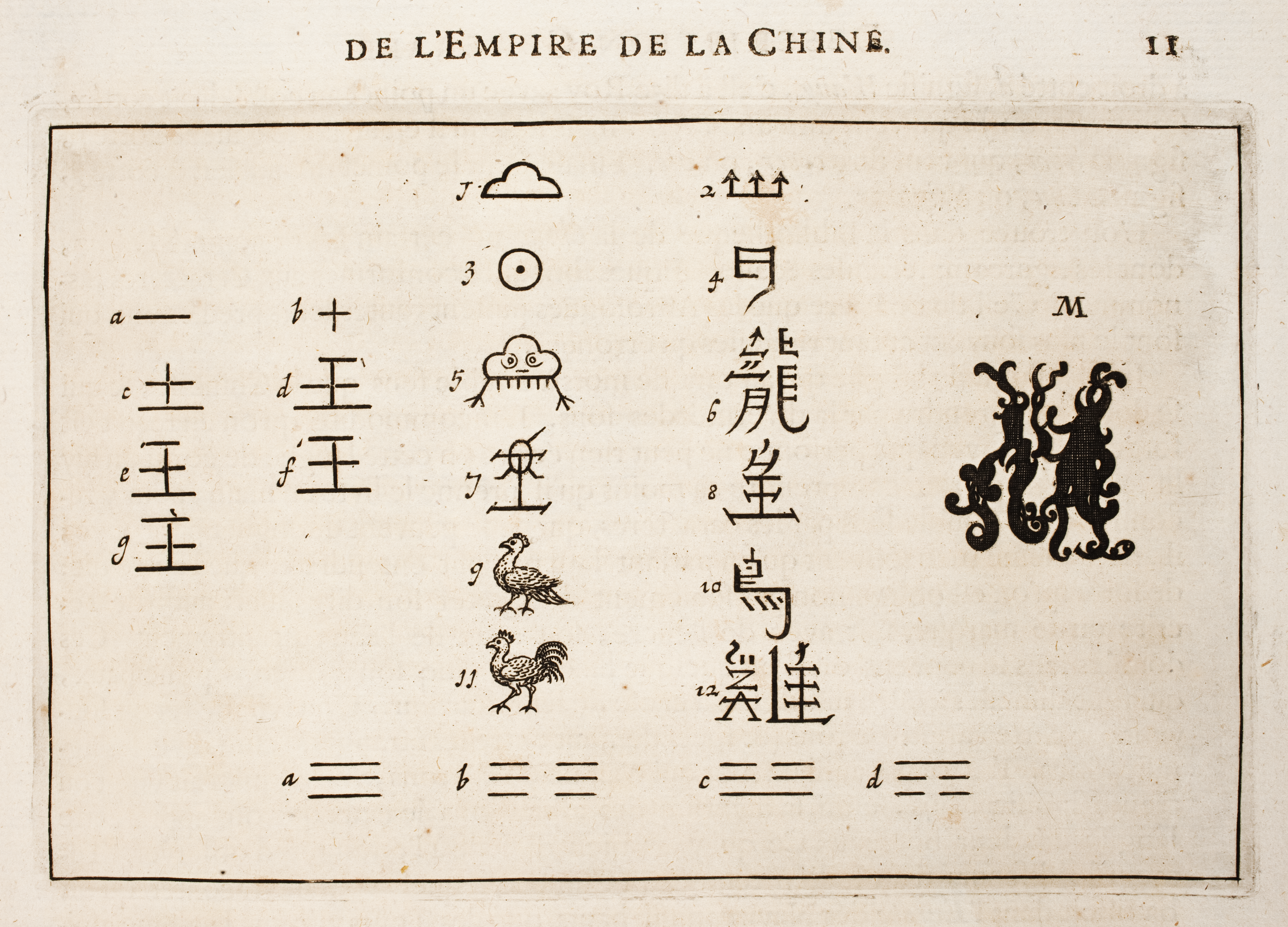
Nieuhof's presentation of Chinese characters, presenting their development from ancient ideograms (1–12) and I Ching trigrams (a–d), the supposed subtleness of distinctions between them (a–g), and a mangled presentation of a character in Chinese cursive (M). 1665 French ed.

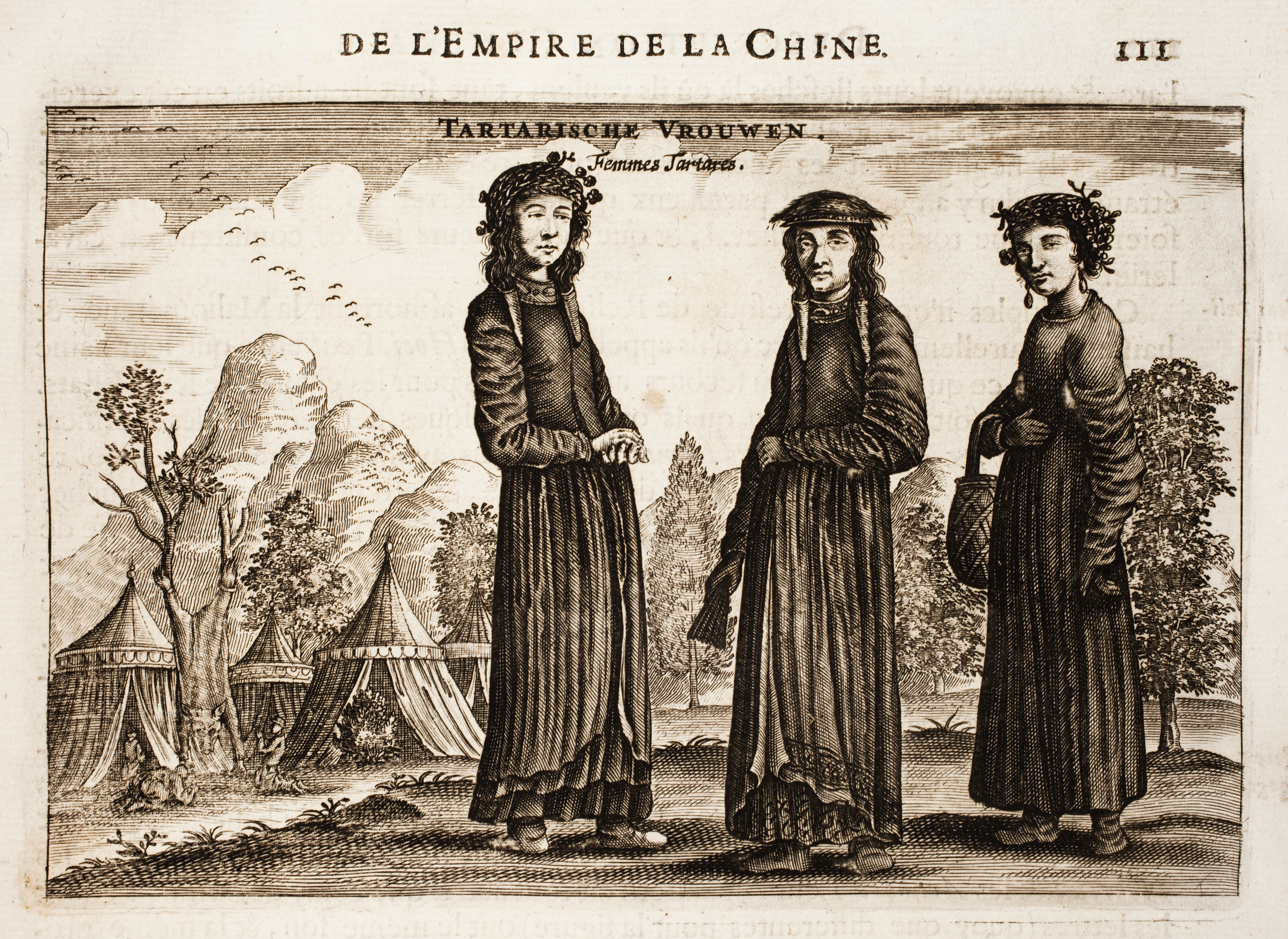
Manchu women and tents, as depicted in the 1665 French edition.

- Nieuhof, Johan (1665), Het Gezantschap der Neêrlandtsche Oost-Indische Compagnie, aan den Grooten Tartarischen Cham, den Tegenwoordigen Keizer van China: Waar in de Gedenkwaerdighste Geschiedenissen, die Onder het Reizen door de Sineesche Landtschappen, Quantung, Kiangsi, Nanking, Xantung en Peking, en aan het Keizerlijke Hof te Peking, Sedert den Jare 1655 tot 1657 zijn Voorgevallen, op het Bondigste Verhandelt Worden. Befeffens een Naukeurige Beschryving der Sineesche Steden, Dorpen, Regeering, Wetenschappen, Hantwerken, Zeden, Godsdiensten, Gebouwen, Drachten, Schepen, Bergen, Gewassen, Dieren, &c. en Oorlogen Tegen de Tarters. [The Embassy of the Dutch East India Company, to the Great Tartar Khan, the Present Emperor of China: Wherein the Most Memorable Stories, which Occurred while Traveling through the Chinese Lands, Guangdong, Jiangxi, Nanjing, Shandong and Beijing, and at the Imperial Court in Beijing, during the Years 1655 to 1657, Are Most Concisely Treated. Besides an Accurate Description of the Chinese Cities, Villages, Government, Sciences, Crafts, Customs, Religions, Buildings, Drapes, Ships, Mountains, Crops, Animals, &c. and Wars Against the Tartars.] (in Dutch), Amsterdam: Jacob van Meurs.
- L'Ambassade de Compagnie Orientale des Provinces Unies vers l'Empereur de la Chine, ou Grand Cam de Tartarie, Faite par les Srs. Pierre de Goyer, & Jacob de Keyser, Illustrée d'une Tres-Exacte Description des Villes, Bourgs, Villages, Ports de Mers, & Autres Lieux Plus Considerables de la Chine [The Embassy of the Oriental Company of the United Provinces to the Emperor of China, or Grand Khan of Tartary, Made by Messrs. Pieter de Goyer, & Jacob de Keizer, Illustrate by a Very Exact Description of the Cities, Towns, Villages, Seaports, & Other More Important Places of China] (in French), translated by Jean le Carpentier, Amsterdam: Jacob van Meurs, 1665.
- Die Gesantschaft der Ost-Indischen Geselschaft in den Vereinigten Niederländern, an den Tartarischen Cham, und Nunmehr Auch Sinischen Keiser, Verrichtet durch die Herren Peter de Gojern, und Jacob Keisern. Darinnen Begriffen die Aller Märkwürdigsten Sachen, Welche Ihnen, auf Währender Reise vom 1655. Jahre bis in das 1657. Aufgestossen. Wie Auch eine Wahrhaftige Beschreibung der Gestossen. Wie Auch eine Wahrhaftige Beschreibung der Fürnehmsten Städte, Flekken, Dörfer, und Götzenheuser der Siner; Ja Selbsten Ihrer Herrschaften, Götzendienste, Obrigkeiten, Satzungen, Sitten, Wissenschafften, Vermögenheit, Reichtühmer, Trachten, Tiere, Früchte, Berge, und Dergleichen. [The Legation of the East India Company in the United Netherlands, to the Tartar Khan, and Now Also Chinese Emperor, Performed by Misters Pieter de Goyer and Jacob de Keizer. Herein Contained All the Most Remarkable Things which They Encountered on Their Journey from the Year 1655 to 1657. As Well as a True Description of the Most Important Cities, Towns, Villages, and Idol Houses of the Sinae; Yea, Even Their Rulers, Idolatries, Authorities, Statutes, Customs, Knowledge, Wealth, Riches, Fashions, Animals, Fruits, Mountains, and the Like.] (in German), Jacob van Meurs, 1666.
- Legatio Batavica ad Magnum Tartariae Chamum Sungteium, Modernum Sinae Imperatorem. Historiarum Narratione, quae Legatis in Provinciis Quantung, Kiangsi, Nanking, Xantung, Peking, & Aula Imperatorià ab Anno 1655 ad Annum 1657 Obtigerunt, ut & Ardua Sinensium in Bello Tartarico Fortunà, Provinciarum Accurata Geographia, Urbium Delineatione [The Dutch Legation to Ijishun Dasan the Great Khan of Tartary. With a Narrative of the History which Was Obtained by the Legates in the Provinces Guangdong, Jiangxi, Nanjing, Shandong, Peking and in the Imperial Hall from the Year 1655 to the Year 1657, as Also with the Harsh Fortunes of the Chinese in the Tartar War, an Accurate Geography of the Provinces, and a Delineation of the Cities] (in Latin), translated by Georg Horn, Amsterdam: Jacob van Meurs, 1668, with introduction probably by Jacob Golius.
- An Embassy from the East-India Company of the United Provinces, to the Grand Tartar Cham Emperour of China, Delivered by Their Excell[en]cies Peter De Goyer, and Jacob De Keyzer, at His Imperial City of Peking. Wherein the Cities, Towns, Villages, Ports, Rivers, &c. in Their Passages from Canton to Peking, are Ingeniously Described by Mr. John Nieuhoff, Steward to the Ambassadours. Also an Epistle of Father John Adams Their Antagonist, Concerning the Whole Negotiation. With an Appendix of Several Remarks Taken Out of father Athanasius Kircher. Englished and Set Forth with their Several Sculptures, by John Ogilby, Esq; Master of his Majesties Revels in the Kingdom of Ireland., translated by John Ogilby, London: Printed by John Macock for the author, 1669, OCLC 123206427.
- An Embassy from the East-India Company of the United Provinces, to the Grand Tartar Cham Emperor of China, Deliver'd by their Excellencies Peter de Goyer and Jacob de Keyzer, at His Imperial City of Peking, wherein the Cities, Towns, Villages, Ports, Rivers, &c. in Their Passages from Canton to Peking, Are Ingeniously Described... Also an Epistle of Father John Adams Their Antagonist, Concerning the Whole Negotiation, with an Appendix of Several Remarks Taken out of Father Athanasius Kircher, translated by John Ogilby, London: John Ogilby, 1673.

== See also ==
- External links to copies of the book: On archive.org and on The Digital Library for the Decorative Arts and Material Culture
- List of works about the Dutch East India Company
