= John Ogilby =

Scottish translator, impresario and cartographer (1600–1676)

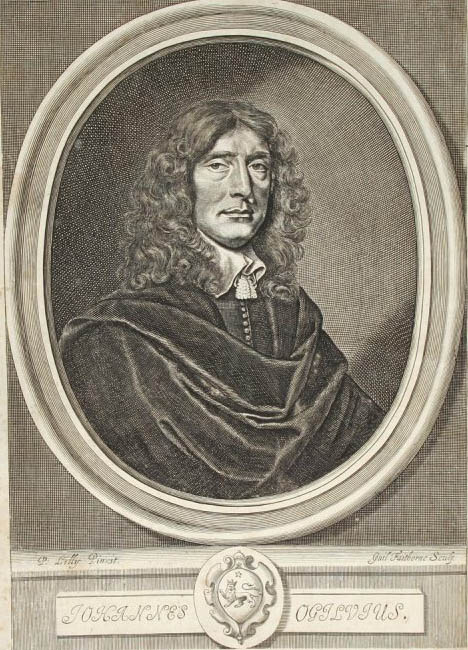
- Portrait from a 1660 edition of Homer's Iliad
- Born: 17 November 1600; Kirriemuir (Angus, Scotland)
- Died: 4 September 1676 (aged 75); London, England
- Occupations: Translator; impresario; cartographer
- Notable work: Translations of Virgil and Homer; road atlas of England and Wales

John Ogilby, Ogelby, or Oglivie (17 November 1600 – 4 September 1676) was a Scottish translator, impresario, publisher and cartographer. He was probably at least a half-brother to James Ogilvy, 1st Earl of Airlie, though neither overtly acknowledged this. Ogilby's most-noted works include translations of the works of Virgil and Homer, and his version of the Fables of Aesop.

Ogilby established Ireland's first theatre in Werburgh Street, Dublin, and following the Restoration, that country's first Theatre Royal. Ogilby played a significant part in arrangements for the coronation of King Charles II. Following the Great Fire of 1666, Ogilby's large-scale map of the City of London was founded on precise survey work, and his Britannia is the first road atlas of England and Wales to be based on surveys and measurements, and drawn to scale.

== Life ==
=== Childhood and youth (1600–1618) ===
John Ogilby's birthplace and parentage are historically uncertain; most early biographies of Ogilby rely on the notes of his assistant John Aubrey that were made for Aubrey's Brief Lives, a collection of biographies of Ogilby and others. The accuracy of Aubrey's account is questionable; Aubrey noted Ogilby was evasive about his origins, saying only he was born "near Edinburgh" in 1600 "of a gentleman's family". Later scholarship has discovered that in 1653, Ogilby consulted the noted astrologer Elias Ashmole, and that Ashmole subsequently included Ogilby's horoscope in a personal collection of his horoscopes of notable people. The horoscope required precise data; Ashmole gives the exact location of Ogilby's birth as "Killemeure" (Kirriemuir near Dundee (Note: Kirriemuir is about twenty statute miles, eighteen Scottish miles and 32 kilometres north of Dundee and the nearest town – about 5 mi (8.0 km) north-west – to Airlie, the seat of the lairds of Airlie.) (Note: This is Ereira's supposition. Van Eerde reads the location given on the horoscope as "Kellemeane" and is unable to identify any place of that or similar name on any maps of the time.)) and the exact date and time as 17 November 1600 at 04:00.

Ogilby believed himself to be at least a half-brother to James Ogilvy, 1st Earl of Airlie, (Note: In the second edition of Virgil, Ogilby signed himself as Johannes Ogilvius, with the Ogilvy coat-of-arms in a cartouche, charged with a heraldic star that indicated "younger son": the final plate of the book was dedicated to the Garter King of Arms, in effect (Alan Ereira says) to assert the validity of his use of the arms. Neither Ereira nor Van Eerde, however, were able to find any evidence of an overt claim to direct family connection and Van Eerde strongly questions whether such a connection ever existed. In 1625, John Ogilvie (1587 – 1625, second brother to the Earl) affirmed in his will he was "brother german" (full, unquestioned brother) of the future Earl, seemingly to distinguish himself from John Ogilby.) given at birth to John Ogilby (senior), a well-off gentleman's tailor in Edinburgh, to be adopted. (Note: There are no records of the circumstances of his fostering and adoption by John Ogilby (senior), at the time a well-to-do tailor in Edinburgh and distant kinsman to the noble Lord Ogilvie. Ereira suggests two possible reasons. The first is his claimed father, Lord Ogilvie, had engaged in pitched battle with the neighbouring Lindsay clan and as a result was subjected to severe sanctions by the Privy Council of Scotland. This put the family in very difficult circumstances: the eldest son, the future Earl of Airlie, was sent to the continent and perhaps a foster family in Edinburgh was the safest place for a baby. The second is his mother, Jean Ruthven, may have conceived while her husband was away at war with the Lindsays.) He was most likely educated at the Merchant Taylors' grammar school in London. (Note: In 1606, the Ogilby family followed King James I and VI when the court transferred to London and Ogilby Sr was admitted to membership of the Worshipful Company of Merchant Taylors. This meant attendance of the school was his right. Ereira notes Ogilby's name does not appear on the school register but that this is not surprising because the register records only pupils taking an examination called the "probation".) At eleven years old, Ogilby was indentured as an apprentice to John Draper, one of just three licensed dance masters in London. At the time, a dancing master had expertise in "grammar (elocution), rhetoric, logic, philosophy, history, music, mathematics and in other arts": ability to dance in "Old Measures" was considered an essential skill for the upper classes. In 1617, Draper became a barrister at Gray's Inn and released Ogilby, who by then was highly accomplished as a dancer and a teacher, from the apprenticeship, allowing him to set up as a master in his own right and to take part in theatrical performances. A fall while dancing in a masque in February 1619 (aged 18), however, lamed him for life and ended his career as a dancer, though not as a teacher.

=== Early adulthood (1619−1633) ===
Information about John Ogilby's early adulthood is limited. According to Ashmole's horoscope, in 1625, Ogilby suffered from a "double quotidian ague" (a form of malaria) he most probably contracted while fighting in the Low Countries under Colonel Sir Charles Rich. In May 1626, he is recorded as holding the rank of lieutenant in the army of Count Mansfield, subsequently becoming a prisoner of war in Dunkirk from July 1626 to June 1627. From June to November 1627, Ogilby was one of the few survivors of the ill-fated English Siege of Saint-Martin-de-Ré, returning to England as acting Captain of a supply ship.

=== Ireland (1633−1646) ===
In August 1633, Thomas Wentworth, 1st Earl of Strafford, the newly appointed Lord Deputy of Ireland, invited Ogilby to Ireland to be dancing tutor to his wife and children, and a member of his troop of guards. While in Dublin, Ogilby established Ireland's first theatre, the Werburgh Street Theatre. In 1637, as a consequence of this enterprise and to discourage competitors, Wentworth appointed Ogilby as Master of the Revels for Ireland, with power to permit and forbid performances. The theatre remained open for four years; it had mixed success but it had to be closed as a result of the Irish Rebellion of 1641. With theatre and dancing ruled out, Ogilby spent his time learning Latin and then translating the complete works of Virgil.

=== Writer and publisher, marriage (1647−1660) ===
Ogilby returned to England in January 1647, being shipwrecked on his homeward journey. The manuscript of his Virgil translation, which he had carefully placed in waterproof wrapping, survived the incident and was published in October 1648 with the sponsorship of Royalist gentlefolk and nobility.

In 1650, Ogilby married rich heiress Christian Hunsdon, a widow in her sixties and about 17 years Ogilby's senior. The following year, he published the first edition of his work The fables of Aesop paraphras'd in verse, and adorn'd with sculpture (Note: perspective illustrations) and illustrated with annotations, which was illustrated by Francis Cleyn. Ogilby's version of the text was very successful, running to five editions in the following 15 years.

During the next few years, Ogilby learnt Greek with the intention of creating and publishing a new translation of Homer's Iliad; he planned it to be a magnificent undertaking with an estimated production cost of £5,000. (Note: The modern equivalent of £5,000 in 1660 is about £900,000.) The venture required sponsorship to pay for the engraved illustrations, each of which would cost about £10, (Note: The modern equivalent of £10 in 1660 is about £2,000.) but he secured only 47 sponsors. When the work published in March 1660, it had 600 pages but was substantially less illustrated than Ogilby had planned. With his known Royalist sympathies, Ogilby was a risk to potential patrons who needed to avoid offending the Puritan Commonwealth government.

=== Restoration of the monarchy, the Great Fire and Royal Cosmographer (1661–1676) ===
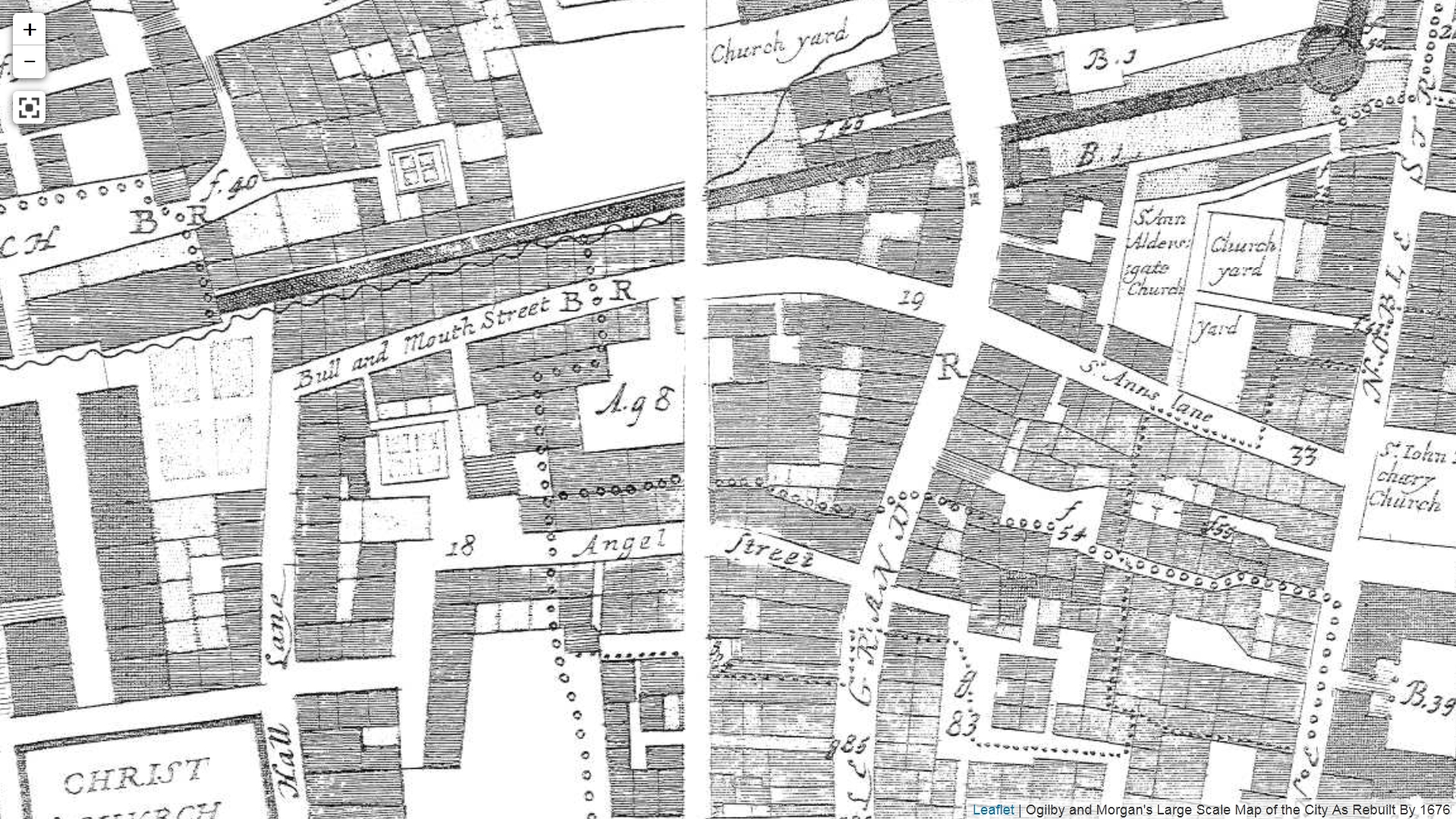
Detail from Ogilby and Morgan's "most accurate Survey of the City of London and Libertyes therof"

The Restoration of Charles II brought favour back to Ogilby. In 1661, he was granted the unpaid title "Master of the Royal Imprimerie" (King's Printer). With Charles's coronation scheduled for 23 April 1661 – St. George's Day – the Common Council of the City of London contracted Ogilby to "compose speeches, songs and inscriptions" for the coronation procession from the Tower of London to Whitehall.

A year later, Ogilby was again made Master of the Revels in Ireland, and he started building a new theatre in Smock Alley, Dublin. The libretto of Katherine Philips's musical play Pompey, which was performed at Smock Alley in 1663, credits Ogilby as the composer of the tunes. His second sojourn in Ireland was short-lived; in July 1664, he returned to plague-stricken London, leaving his step-son to take his place. In 1665, he published a second, revised edition of The Fables of Aesop, which was this time illustrated with prints by Wenceslaus Hollar.

During the Great Fire of London in 1666, Ogilby's house in Shoe Lane, together with its printing works and most of his stock, was destroyed; he estimated he had lost £3,000. (Note: The modern equivalent of £3,000 in 1666 is about £600,000.) After the Great Fire, the Corporation of London appointed Ogilby and his wife's grandson William Morgan as "sworn viewers", members of a group of four trustworthy gentlemen directed by Robert Hooke, to plot disputed property in the city. Ogilby later made what he called "the most accurate Survey of the City of London and Libertyes therof that has ever been done". By 1668, he had a new house in Whitefriars, and was ready to resume his printing and publishing work.

Ogilby's next major venture was a series of atlases of China, Japan, Africa, Asia and America. The first of these was An Embassy from the East India Company of the United Provinces..., first published in 1669 for Ogilby by John Macock and then reprinted in better quality by Ogilby himself in 1673. This book was substantially a translation of Johan Nieuhof's Dutch publication of the same name with English copies of the Dutch engravings, supplemented by the first English translation of sections of Athanasius Kircher's China Illustrata, relating various information from the Jesuit China Mission. Ogilby's Africa appeared in 1670 and was followed in rapid succession by Atlas Japanennsis (1670), America (1671), Atlas Chinensis (1671) and Asia (1673). In 1671, in response to his proposal to make a detailed survey and atlas of Great Britain, the King appointed Ogilby Royal Cosmographer. (Note: Parker gives 1674; according to Ereira, this is the date when his title was upgraded to "His Majesty's Cosmographer and Royal Printer".) Thus, at about the age of 70 and with the scientific advice of Robert Hooke, Ogilby began work on Britannia, the project for which he is best known among cartographers.

==== Britannia ====
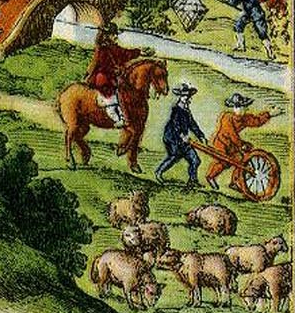
A surveyor's wheel in use (detail from the frontispiece of Britannia)

In 1675, Ogilby issued his atlas, which he titled Britannia, in the form of a strip map for each major route. The work contains 100 strip road maps that are accompanied by a double-sided page of text giving additional advice for the map's use, and notes on the towns shown and the pronunciations of their names. The roads were measured using a surveyor's wheel, which Ogilby called his "way-wiser", and were plotted at one inch to the statute mile – a scale of 1:63,360 – an Ogilby innovation. The maps include details such as the configurations of hills, bridges and ferries, and the relative sizes of towns. Ogilby is noted in cartography for these innovations.

The cost of the survey and the resulting maps is not known but in a prospectus, Ogilby quotes a preliminary estimate made by the "Lords Referees" – advisors to the Privy Council – as £14,000 (equivalent to about £2.7 million today). Ogilby worked hard to raise this considerable sum by holding lotteries, and with the help of Robert Hooke, who made multiple petitions to the Crown, the Court of Common Council and Court of Aldermen of the Corporation of London and to noble families. Writing in 1925, geographer Sir Herbert Fordham said:

twice only ... has there been such [measurement of roads]: that of John Ogilby, in 1671-5, and that of John Cary, quite at the end of the following century. In neither case, singularly enough, did the Government take any steps for the publication of the results of the survey, everything being left, in this respect, to private and commercial enterprise.

=== Death ===
Ogilby died in September 1676 and was buried in the vault of St Bride's Church, one of Sir Christopher Wren's new London churches. In his will, dated 27 February 1675, Ogilby bequeathed his entire estate to "my deare wife Christian Ogilby and to William Morgan, her grandchild". The value of his estate is not recorded but the British Museum has a copy of an announcement by Robert Morden, a factor, of a sale of "undisposed" books and maps from Ogilby's collection, with an asserted value of £517 10s. (Note: equivalent to about £111,000 today)

== Legacy ==
In the years that followed his death, Ogilby's reputation as a poetic translator suffered from attacks made on him by John Dryden in his satirical work MacFlecknoe, and by Alexander Pope in The Dunciad. Following their lead, Scottish philosopher David Hume used Ogilby's work to illustrate the idea that common sense frequently appeals to a "standard of taste" in aesthetic matters:

Whoever would assert an equality of genius and elegance between Ogilby and [John] Milton, or [John] Bunyan and [Joseph] Addison, would be thought to defend no less an extravagance, than if he had maintained a mole-hill to be as high as Teneriffe [sic], or a pond as extensive as the ocean.

Other writers were even more critical; Ogilby's entry in the Encyclopaedia Londinensis (about 1800) reads:

The chief merit of his Homer consists in a commendable and uniform fidelity to the sense of his author. As a poet, his pretensions to praise of any kind can scarcely be supported: he has neither animation of thought, accuracy of taste, sensibility of feeling, nor ornament of diction.

Such judgements stuck, and it is only since the mid-20th century that Ogilby's work has again been given scholarly attention, particularly his versions of Aesop's Fables. These, according to a short biography published by Theophilus Cibber in 1753, were "generally confessed to have exceeded whatever hath been done before in that kind". They renewed interest in the fable as a literary medium and arguably initiated suggestions of their adaptation to the troubled politics of the time.

== Gallery ==
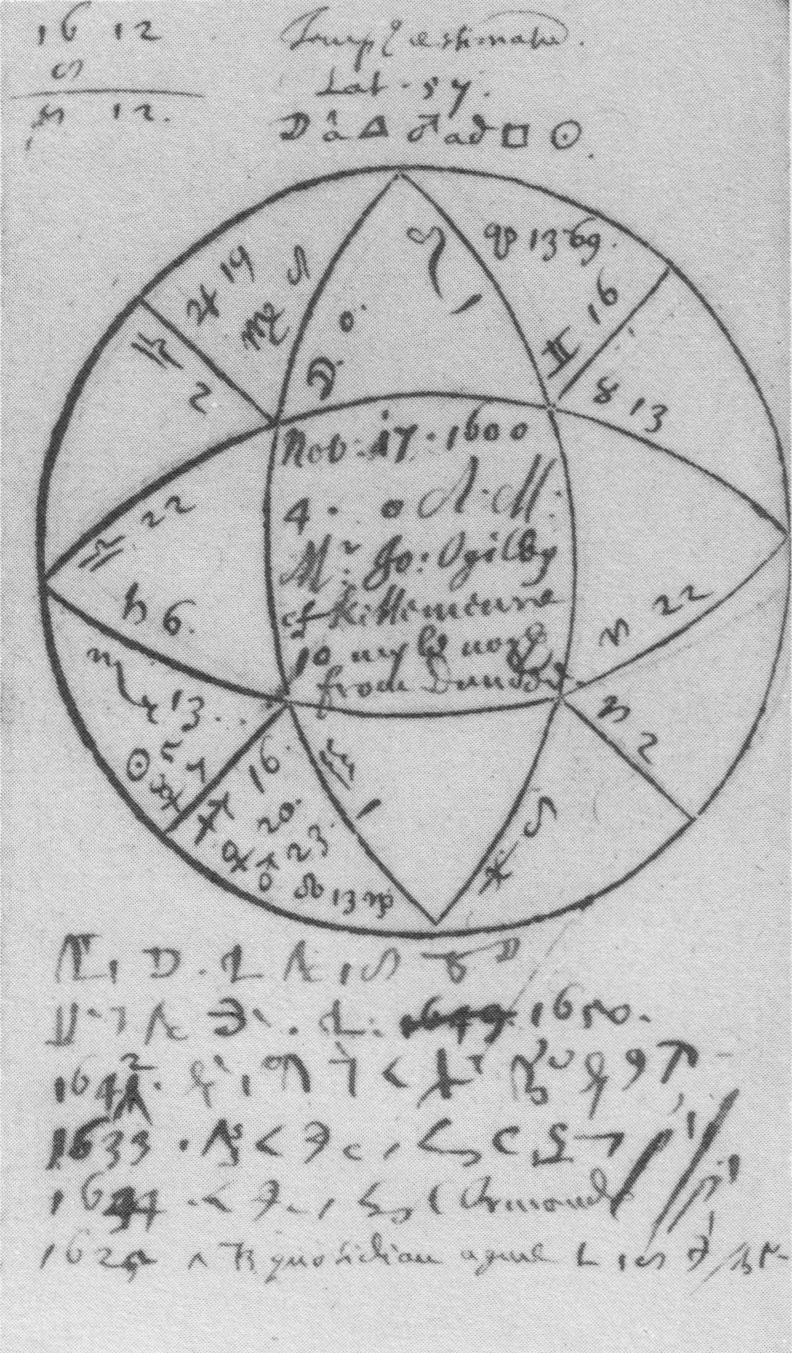
Horoscope drawn by Elias Ashmole about 1680. Bodleian Library collection.

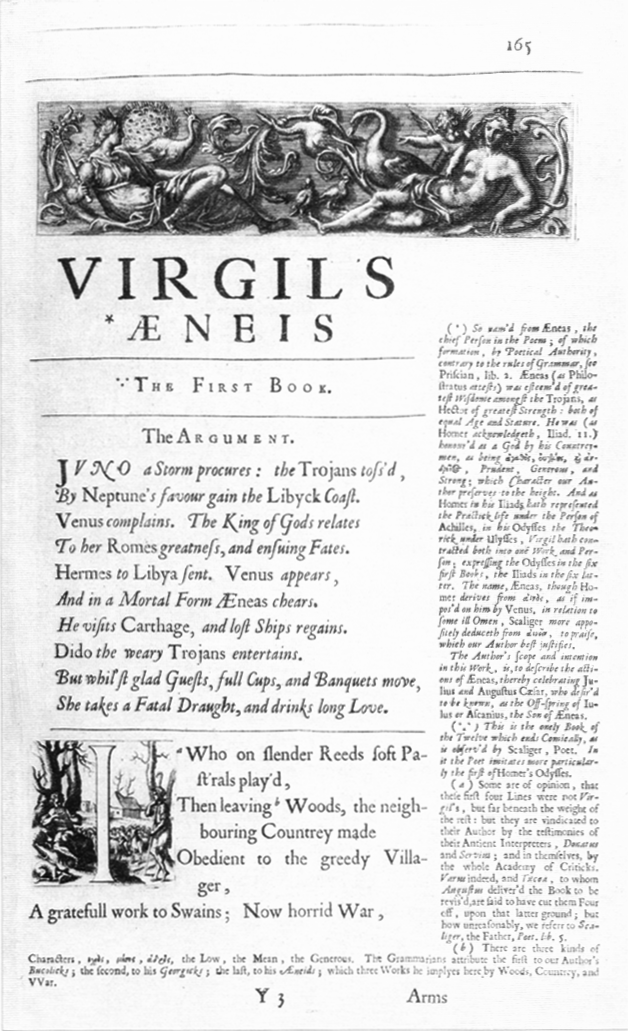
Ogilby's "Virgil's Aeneis", frontispiece

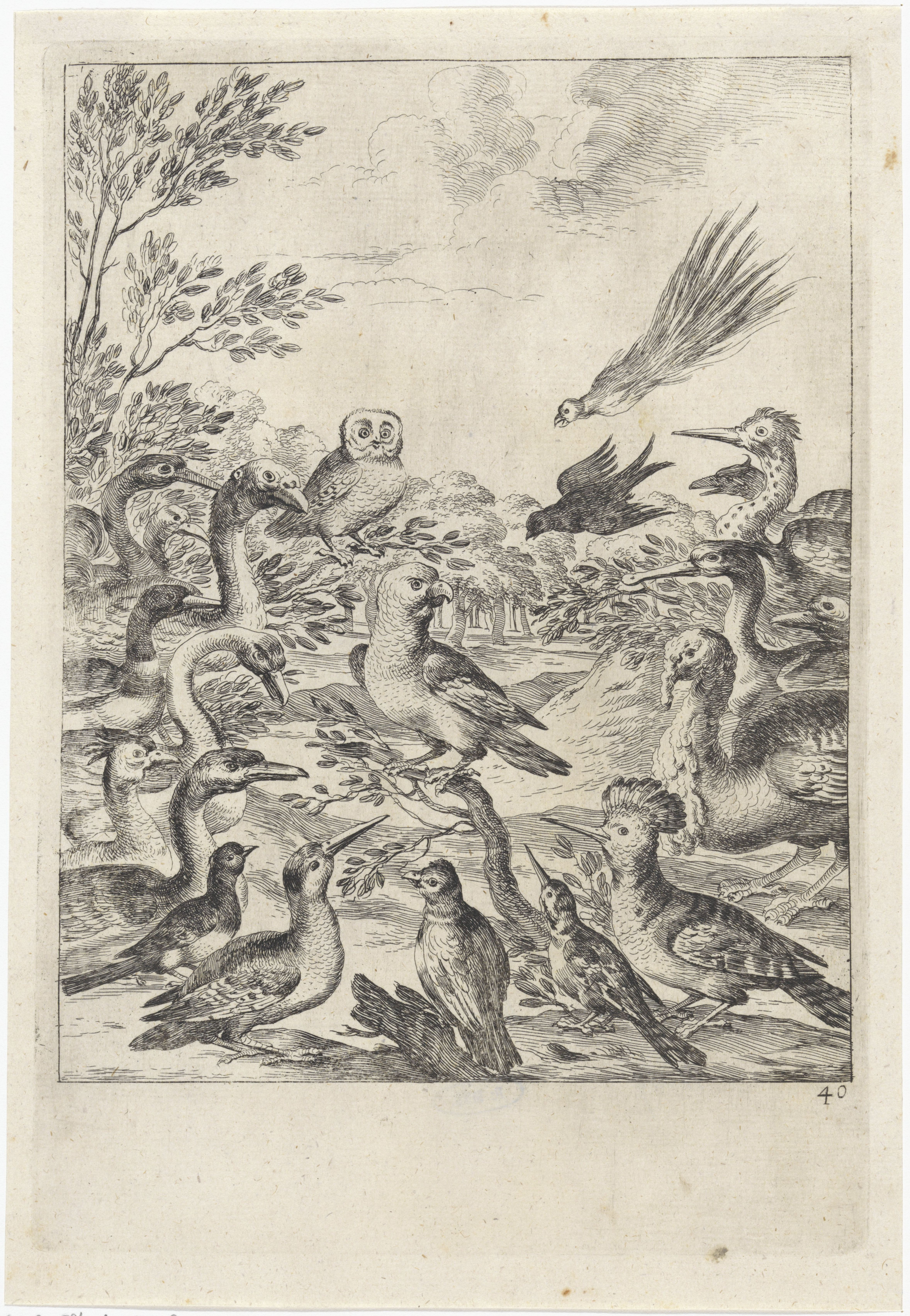
"The parliament of birds" from Ogilby's "The Fables of Aesop"

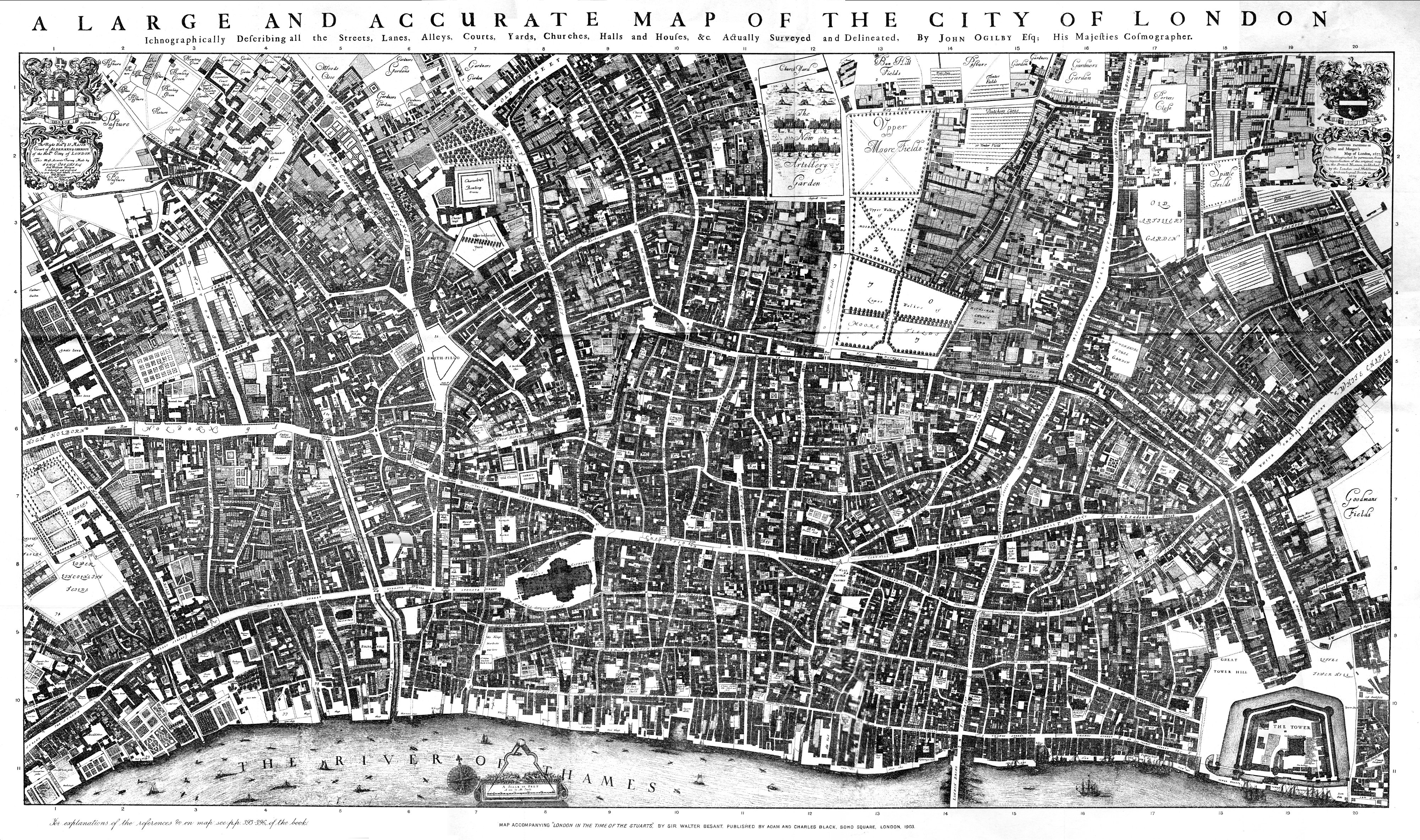
Ogilby and Morgan's map of London, 1677

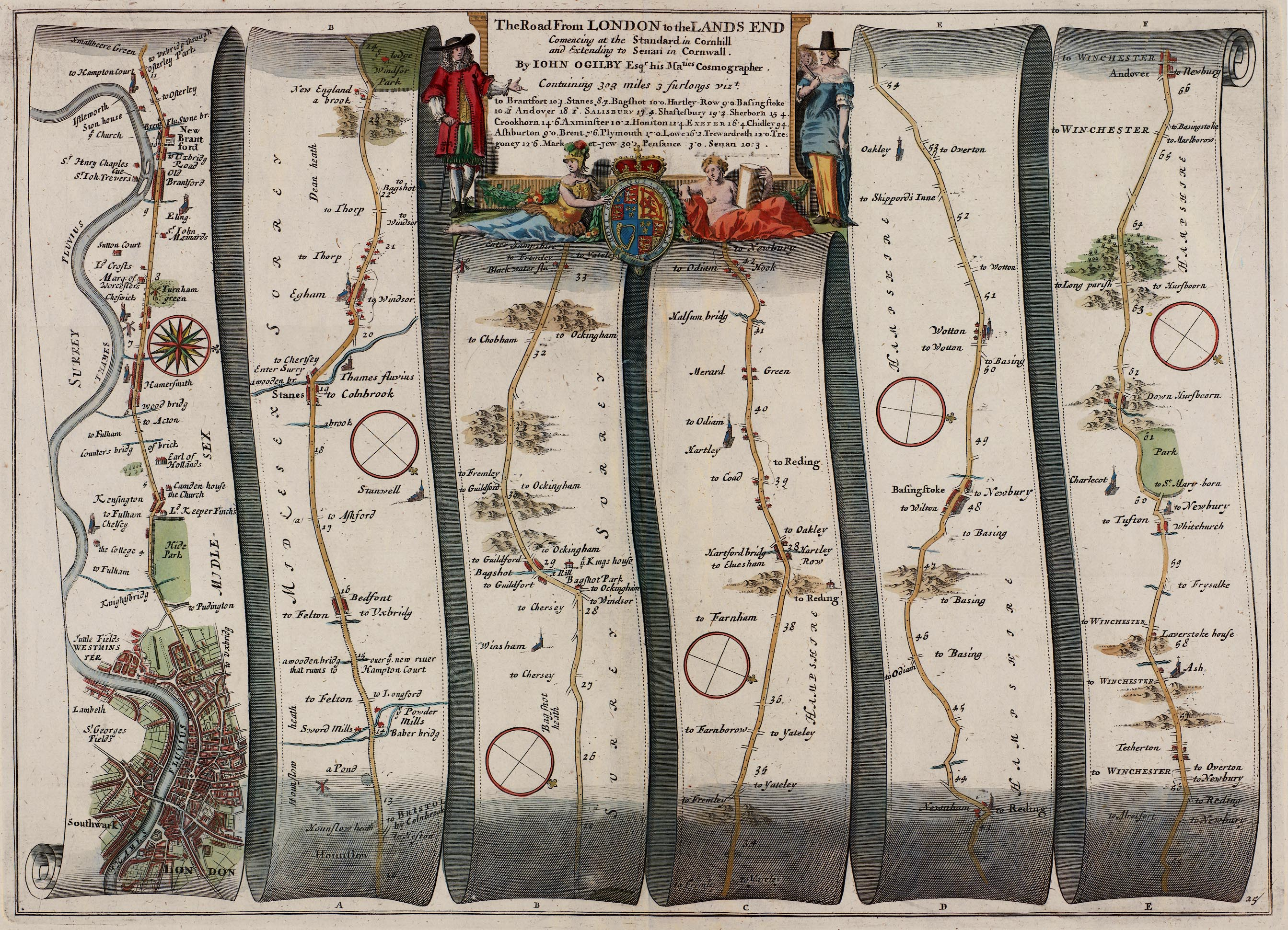
"The Road From London to the Lands End" from Britannia

== See also ==
- Britannia Depicta – Road atlas of Britain first published in 1720
- China Illustrata (1667 Latin work translated in part by Ogilby)
- An Embassy from the East-India Company (1665 Dutch work translated by Ogilby)
- Gough Map – Late Medieval map of Britain
- John Ogilvy (disambiguation)
- Christopher Saxton – English cartographer (c. 1540 – c. 1610)
