= Albert d'Orville =

Belgian Jesuit priest, missionary in China and cartographer

- Traditional Chinese: 吳爾鐸紹伯
- Simplified Chinese: 吴尔铎绍伯
Transcriptions
Standard Mandarin
- Hanyu Pinyin: Wú'ěrduó Shàobó
- Wade–Giles: Wu-erh-tuo Shao-po

Albert Dorville SJ (12 August 1621 – 8 April 1662), also known as Albert, Count of Orville (French: Albert le Comte d’Orville), was a Belgian Jesuit priest who acted as a missionary, cartographer, and explorer in China and Tibet.

== Life ==
Albert was born in Brussels on 12 August 1621, the son of the count of Orville. He spent much of his youth at the court of the Duke of Neuburg.

He joined the Society of Jesus in 1646. While studying theology at the Catholic University of Leuven he attended the 'Chinese lectures' given by Martino Martini an Italian Jesuit missionary, then visiting the University of Leuven. This evoked in him a strong desire to volunteer for the China mission. Permission was granted by his Provincial and soon after being ordained priest (in 1654) Dorville rejoined Martino Martini in Rome before accompanying him on his return journey to China.

Leaving Lisbon in April 1657, Martini, Dorville and 17 other Jesuits (among whom Ferdinand Verbiest) arrived in Macau on 17 July 1658, after a long and arduous journey during which several lost their life. As was the practice for all newly arrived men Dorville spent some time in Macau to learn the Chinese language; he was then sent as missionary in the province of Shanxi.

Soon he was called to Beijing and appointed to accompany Johann Grueber on a journey back to Europe. Grueber was sent to Rome in order to defend Jesuit astronomer Adam Schall against the accusation of 'fostering superstitious practices' (motivated by his working on the Chinese calendar). As traveling over the seas was increasingly difficult and unsafe - the Portuguese were losing their trade monopoly at the hands of the Dutch - they decided to attempt an exploratory overland journey that, if successful could bring China closer to Europe too. The first stretch would lead them to Goa. Leaving Beijing on 13 April 1661 Grueber and Dorville entered Tibet 13 July and spent two months (October and November) in its capital Lhasa. All along the way Dorville did some geographical investigations, determining exactly the longitude and latitude of the places they were passing through. The travelers crossed the Himalayas, entered Nepal and stayed a month in Kathmandu (January 1662). From there they descended into the basin of the Ganges river, entered India (8 February) and visited Patna, and Benares before arriving finally in Agra (31 March), the former capital of the Mughal Empire. Dorville was however seriously sick and exhausted by the harrowing 214-day journey: he died 8 April 1662, a week after reaching Agra.

For the rest of the journey back from Goa to Europe, Grueber was accompanied by Heinrich Roth, a Jesuit Sanskrit scholar. On arrival in Rome in 1664 Grueber gave an account of their odyssey. Numerous and interesting observations - geographical, cultural, socio-religious - were made on the countries traveled across and people encountered. With regard to finding a shorter route to China the exploratory journey was a failure: travelers continued, and for many years, to go by ship form Goa to Macau and China. The overland journey was too long, hazardous and thoroughly exhausting.

== Works ==
- Voyage à la Chine des PP. J. Grueber et d'Orville [Fathers J. Grueber and d'Orville's Journey to China] (in French), 1696, with Johann Grüber.

== Bibliography ==
- Johannes Grueber: Als Kundschafter des Papstes nach China (1656–1664) (in German), Stuttgart, 1985.
- Wessels, C. (1924), Early Jesuit Travellers in Central Asia (1603–1721), The Hague, pp. 164–202.
