= Johan Nieuhof =

Dutch explorer, writer, sinologist (1618–1672)

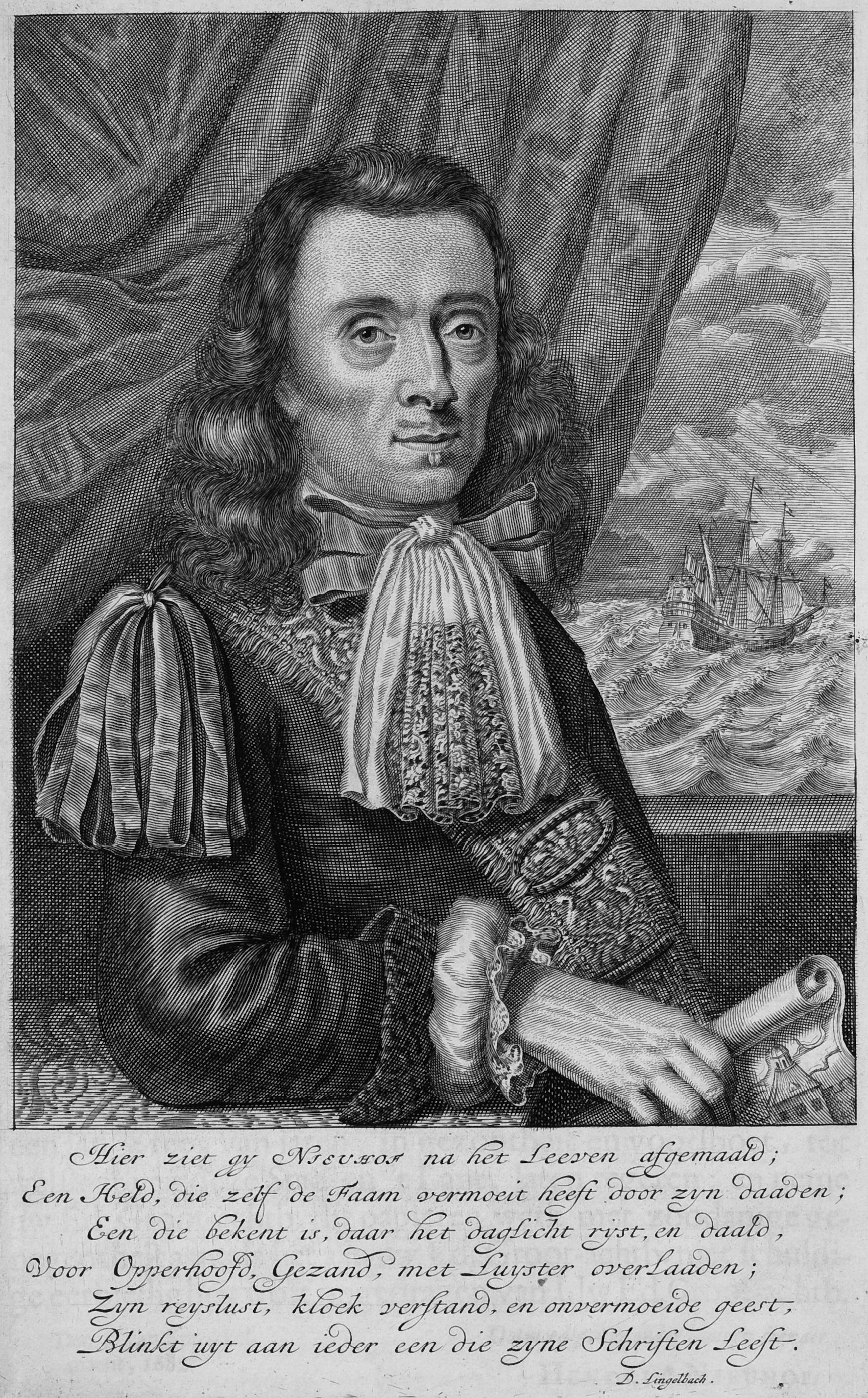
Joan Nieuhof

Johan Nieuhof (22 July 1618 – 8 October 1672) was a Dutch traveler who wrote about his journeys to Brazil, China and India. The most famous of these was a trip of 2,400 kilometers (1,500 mi) from Canton to Peking in 1655–1657, which enabled him to become an authoritative Western writer on China. He wrote An Embassy from the East-India Company about the journey.

== Biography ==
Johan Nieuhof was born in Uelsen, a town in the county of Bentheim, Lower Saxony, sitting just on the Dutch side of the Dutch-German border. His father (originally from Zwolle) was mayor of the town, and was later succeeded by one of Johan's brothers and a brother-in-law. By the grace of Cornelis Jan Witsen, a leading figure within the Dutch West India Company (or "WIC"), Nieuhof left for Dutch Brazil in 1640 as a reserve officer-candidate. From then on, barring two short family visits in 1658 and 1671, he spent all the rest of his life abroad.

Nieuhof was employed in Brazil to explore the regions between Maranhão and the São Francisco Rivers, made a particular study of the neighborhood of Pernambuco. He left Brazil in 1649, after the Portuguese victory in the Second Battle of Guararapes. Upon his return, Nieuhof joined the service of the Dutch East India Company (or "VOC"). In the service of the VOC, he resided several years in Batavia, and then was appointed in 1654 steward of an embassy to the relatively new Qing emperor of China under Peter de Goyer and Jacob de Keyser, which aimed to gain trading rights on China's southern coast.

He remained in China until 1657. In 1663, he operated as an ambassador in Quilon, after the occupation of the Malabar Coast by Rijckloff van Goens. During this period, he visited several chiefs of indigenous tribes to secure trade relations with them. Afterwards, he was offered a post on Ceylon where he was stationed between 1663 and 1667. He was imprisoned for seven months because of illegal trade in pearls. Nieuhof was sent to Batavia by Hendrik van Rheede and fired by the Dutch East India Company.

On returning to the Indies from a trip home in 1672, he stopped on the isle of Madagascar. On October 8, 1672, Nieuhof traveled inland along with the first mate, in search of the local tribes in order to trade with them, as well as secure water for his crew. Upon hearing several gunshots, the captain sent a second ship towards the island in order to await Nieuhof's return. After three days of waiting, the captain presumed Nieuhof and his company to be murdered and sailed onwards towards Mauritius. On order of the governing council in Amsterdam, a ship was sent from the Cape of Good Hope to retrieve Nieuhof and his fellows, but no trace of them could be found.

== China memoirs ==
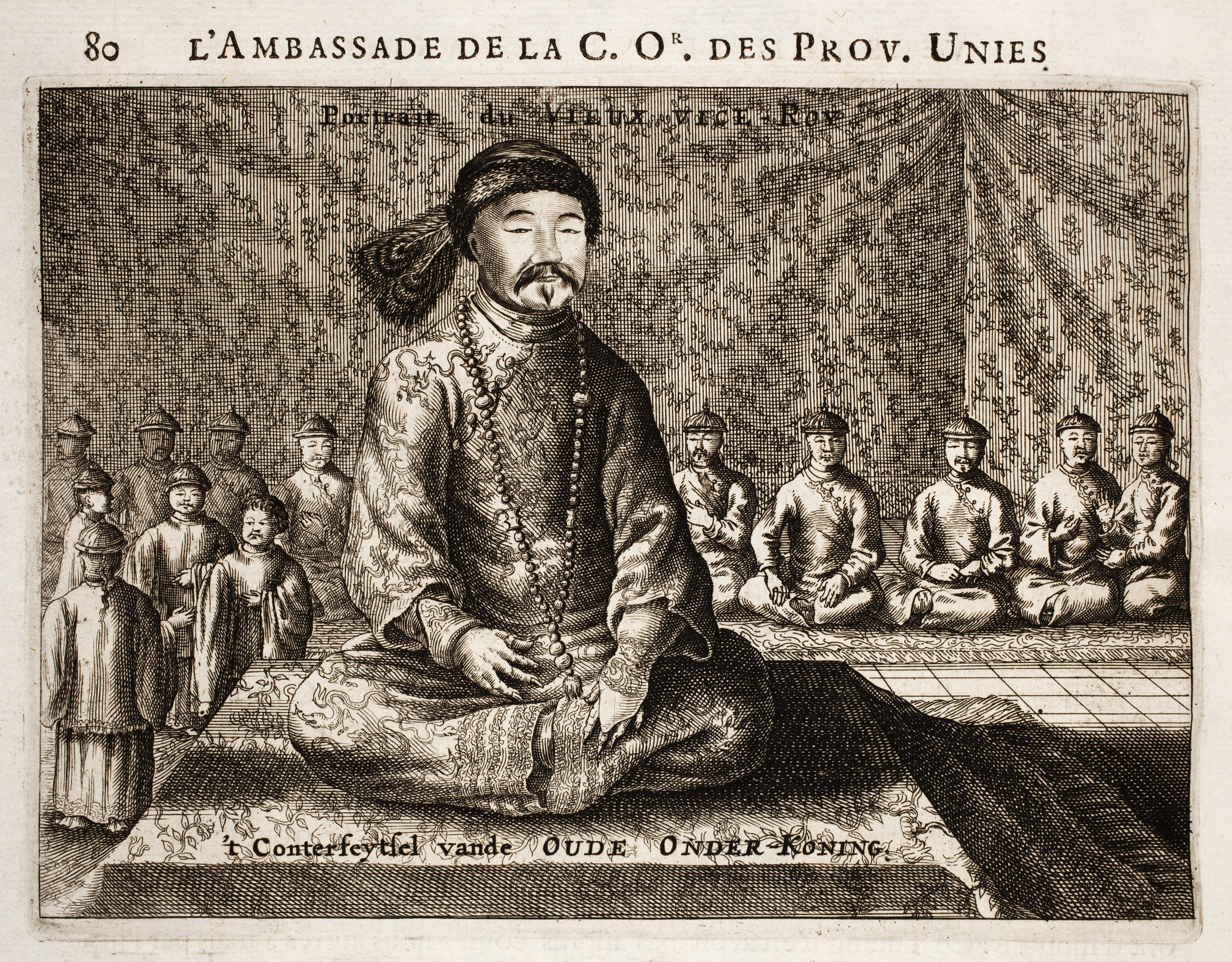
The "Old Viceroy" of Guangdong, Shang Kexi, probably drawn by Johan Nieuhoff himself in Guangzhou in 1655.

In the first half of the 17th century, the VOC tried to break the Portuguese monopoly position on trade to Macau. When they did not succeed, they sent six embassies to Peking between 1655 and 1685. Their aim was to convince the Qing emperor to open up trade relations on the southern coast, in favor of the VOC, although they ultimately failed. Nieuhof was appointed to the position of steward on one of these embassies by Joan Maetsuycker, which traveled from Canton to Peking between 1655 and 1658. They were the second embassy to try and gain the emperor's favor, the first was led by Zacharias Wagenaer. Nieuhof's duties as part of the embassy primarily consisted of ceremonial matters as well as securing lodgings. He was, however, specifically appointed to illustrate any and all of the cities, palaces, temples, rivers and other noteworthy buildings in their true to nature form.

On March 17, 1656, after months of negotiations and discussions of tributes to be paid to the Chinese emperor and viceroy, the embassy left Canton by barge, to travel towards Peking. The embassy arrived at the emperor's court in Peking on July 18 the same year. The hired the jesuit scholar Johann Adam Schall von Bell to be their translator, who warned them of the possible dangers and required ceremonies to approach the emperor. On September 24, the embassy was received by the Shunzhi Emperor. As dictated by their translator, the party performed the traditional kowtow, as failing to do so would most likely result in immediate refusal by the emperor. As a result, the emperor allowed Dutch embassies to visit the court once every eight years, in parties consisting of no more than 100 men. Any trading rights were not discussed nor granted at this point. On October 16 the embassy was asked to leave the city of Peking within two hours. Their return trip took three months; putting the entire length of the embassy at 20 months and 6 days.

At his homecoming in 1658, he had entrusted his notes and annotations to his brother Hendrik, whom Johan thanked when finally (in 1665) Hendrik produced an ample study of China, with many images, text and explanation of the latest events. The work was published by Jacob van Meurs in 1665, titled Het Gezandtschap der Neêrlandtsche Oost-Indische Compagnie, aan den grooten Tartarischen Cham, den tegenwoordigen Keizer van China: Waarin de gedenkwaerdigste Geschiedenissen, die onder het reizen door de Sineesche landtschappen, Quantung, Kiangsi, Nanking, Xantung en Peking, en aan het Keizerlijke Hof te Peking, sedert den jaren 1655 tot 1657 zijn voorgevallen, op het bondigste verhandelt worden. Beneffens een Naukeurige Beschrijvinge der Sineesche Steden, Dorpen, Regeering, Weetenschappen, Hantwerken, Zeden, Godsdiensten, Gebouwen, Drachten, Schepen, Bergen, Gewassen, Dieren, et cetera en oorlogen tegen de Tartar : verçiert men over de 150 afbeeltsels, na't leven in Sina getekent. Hendrik dedicated the work to Hendrik Spiegel and Cornelis Jan Witsen (Nicolaes Witsen's father), administrators of the East and West India Companies respectively. Translations into French (1665), German (1666), Latin (1668) and English (1669) were also published, each going into at least two editions. More of Nieuhoff's material, on Chinese ships, appeared in Nicolaes Witsen's "Scheepsbouw" (1671).

The reports from these embassies and the reports of the Jesuits formed the only reliable source of information on China available in Western Europe. As mentioned, being the purser of the VOC embassy to Peking, Johan Nieuhof in 1655 had special instructions to observe all "farms, towns, palaces, rivers, ... [and other] buildings" that he might pass by, drawing them "in straight form and figure", as well as remains of the historical victory of the "Tartars" (Manchus) that brought an end to the reign of the Ming dynasty. The inclusion of approximately 150 illustrations in the book marked the first time that literature on China contained images that were true to nature. In previously published works, belonging to the imaginative 'fantastic tradition' where fact and fiction were hardly discernible, the Chinese were depicted as creatures of fantasy. Nieuhof's illustrations, as opposed to these previous works, depicted the Chinese and their culture as they were observed by the illustrator himself, without fanciful additions.

The 150 illustrations of the Nieuhoffs' book were one inspiration for chinoiserie, which became especially popular in the 18th century. Many artists and architects based their designs on the pictures in the book. The original drawings were rediscovered in 1984 in the collection of prince Roland Bonaparte, an anthropologist who collected material about Madagascar, Lapland and the Native Americans.

== Works ==
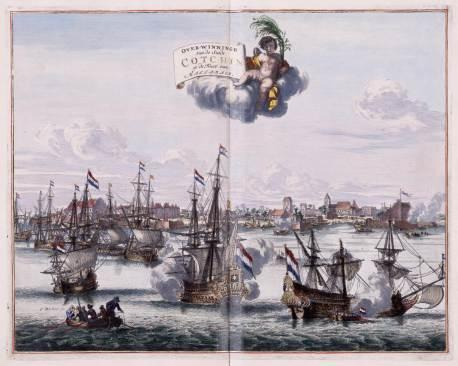
A drawing depicting the city of Kochi published in 1682.

- Johannes Nieuhof (1668), Legatio batavica ad magnum Tartariæ chamum Sungteium, modernum Sinæ imperatorem; Historiarum narratione, quæ legatis in provinciis Quantung, Kiangsi, Nanking, Xantung, Peking, & aula imperatoriâ ab anno 1655 ad annum 1657 obtigerunt ..., Amstelodami: Jacobum Meursium, OCLC 2134985, OL 23411529M
- Het gezantschap der Neêrlandtsche Oost-Indische Compagnie, aan den grooten Tartarischen Cham, den tegenwoordigen keizer van China : waar in de gedenkwaerdighste geschiedenissen, die onder het reizen door de Sineesche landtschappen, Quantung, Kiangsi, Nanking, Xantung en Peking, en aan het keizerlijke hof te Peking, sedert den jare 1655 tot 1657 zijn voorgevallen, op het bondigste verhandelt worden : befeffens een naukeurige Beschryving der Sineesche steden, dorpen, regeering, wetenschappen, hantwerken, zeden, godsdiensten, gebouwen, drachten, schepen, bergen, gewassen, dieren, &c. en oorlogen tegen de Tarters : verçiert men over de 150 afbeeltsels, na't leven in Sina getekent. Amsterdam: Jacob van Meurs, 1665. Title in English: An embassy from the East-India Company (1669).
- Zee- en Lant-Reise door verscheide Gewesten van Oostindien, behelzende veele zeldzaame en wonderlijke voorvallen en geschiedenissen. Beneffens een beschrijving van lantschappen, dieren, gewassen, draghten, zeden en godsdienst der inwoonders: En inzonderheit een wijtloopig verhael der Stad Batavia. Amsterdam: de Weduwe van Jacob van Meurs, 1682. Google books
- Gedenkweerdige Brasiliaense Zee- en Lant-Reise und Zee- en Lant-Reize door verscheide Gewesten van Oostindien. Amsterdam: de Weduwe van Jacob van Meurs, 1682.

== Bibliography ==
- Blussé, L. & R. Falkenburg (1987) Johan Nieuwhofs beelden van een Chinareis, 1655-1657. Middelburg.
- Nieuhof, J. (1988) Voyages & Travels to the East Indies 1653-1670. Oxford University Press (facsimile reprint).
- Sun, Jing (2013) The illusion of verisimilitude: Johan Nieuhof’s images of China, PhD dissertation Leiden University pdf
- Ulrichs, F. (2003) Johan Nieuhofs Blick auf China (1655-1657). Die Kupferstiche in seinem Chinabuch und ihre Wirkung auf den Verleger Jacob van Meurs, Sinologica Coloniensia 21, Harrossowitz Verlag Wiesbaden. ISBN 3-447-04708-9
- Wilson, J. G.; Fiske, J., eds. (1900). "Nieuwhof, Johann Jacob" . Appletons' Cyclopædia of American Biography. New York: D. Appleton.
