= Jacob van Meurs =

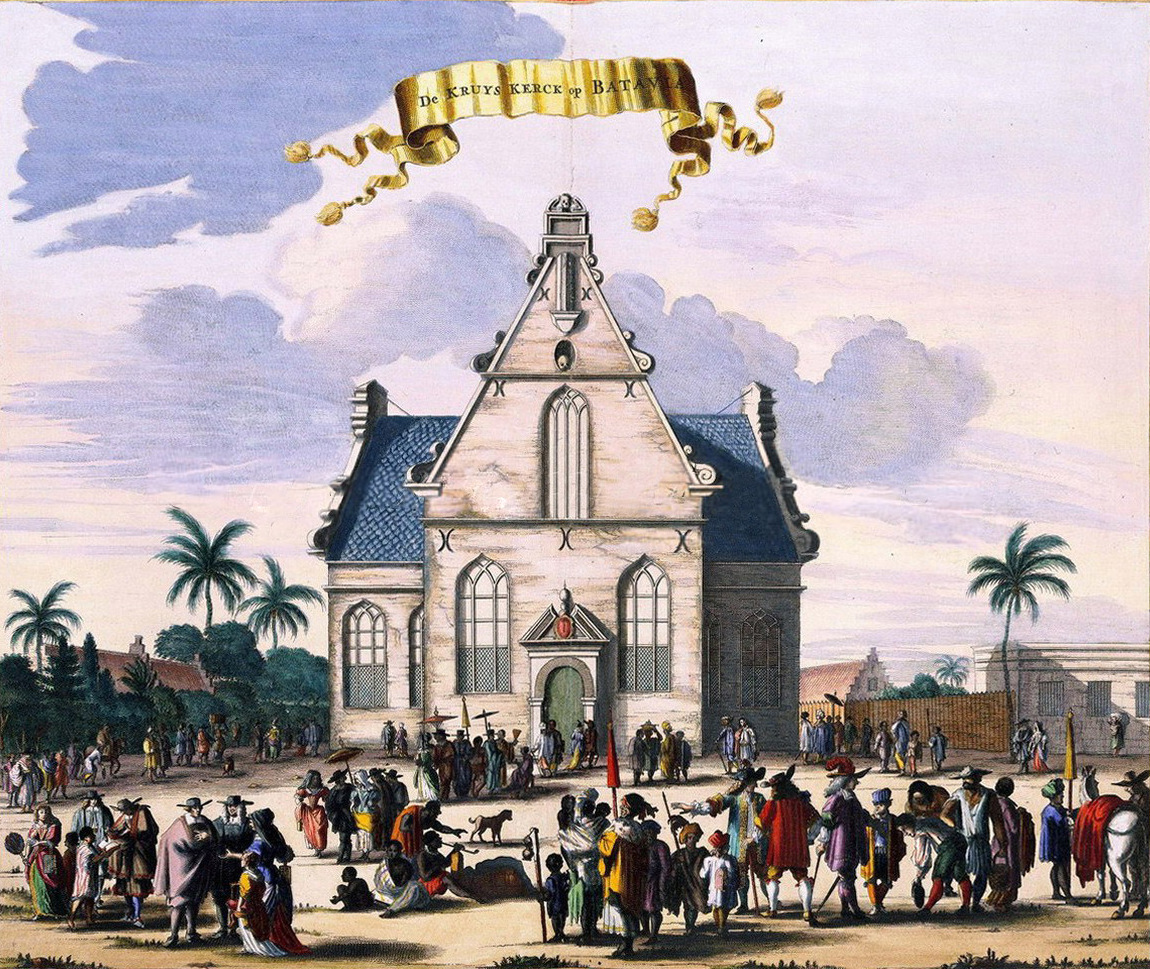
Jacob van Meurs, Kruis Kerk, 1682, now demolished

Jacob van Meurs (1619/1620 - c. 1680) was a Dutch engraver and publisher from Amsterdam. His works are in the National Gallery of Art and the National Portrait Gallery. Active from 1651 to 1680, he specialized in works of geography, travelogues, and history. He published the first version of The New and Unknown World: or Description of America and the Southland which was printed in Dutch and included 125 copper engravings.
