= Tuhua =

Tuhua may refer to:

== Chinese dialects ==
- Tuhua (Chinese dialect)
  - Yuebei Tuhua, an unclassified Chinese language of Guangdong and Guangxi provinces
  - Xiangnan Tuhua, an unclassified Chinese language of southeastern Hunan

== New Zealand place names ==
- Mayor Island / Tūhua, a volcano in New Zealand
- Tuhua railway station, a station on the Stratford–Okahukura Line in New Zealand
