= Tuhua dialects =

- Traditional Chinese: 土話
- Simplified Chinese: 土话
- Literal meaning: Dirt/Local/Rural Speech
Transcriptions
Standard Mandarin
- Hanyu Pinyin: Tǔhuà
- Wade–Giles: T'u-hua

Tuhua are varieties of Chinese spoken in the Nanling area of southern China. Highly unusual and mutually unintelligible with Mandarin, Cantonese, and Xiang, their precise origin and classification are disputed.

Two varieties are identified:

- Xiangnan Tuhua in southern Hunan
- Shaozhou or Yuebei Tuhua around Shaoguan in northern Guangdong
