= Shixing County =

Shixing 始兴县 Chihing
- County
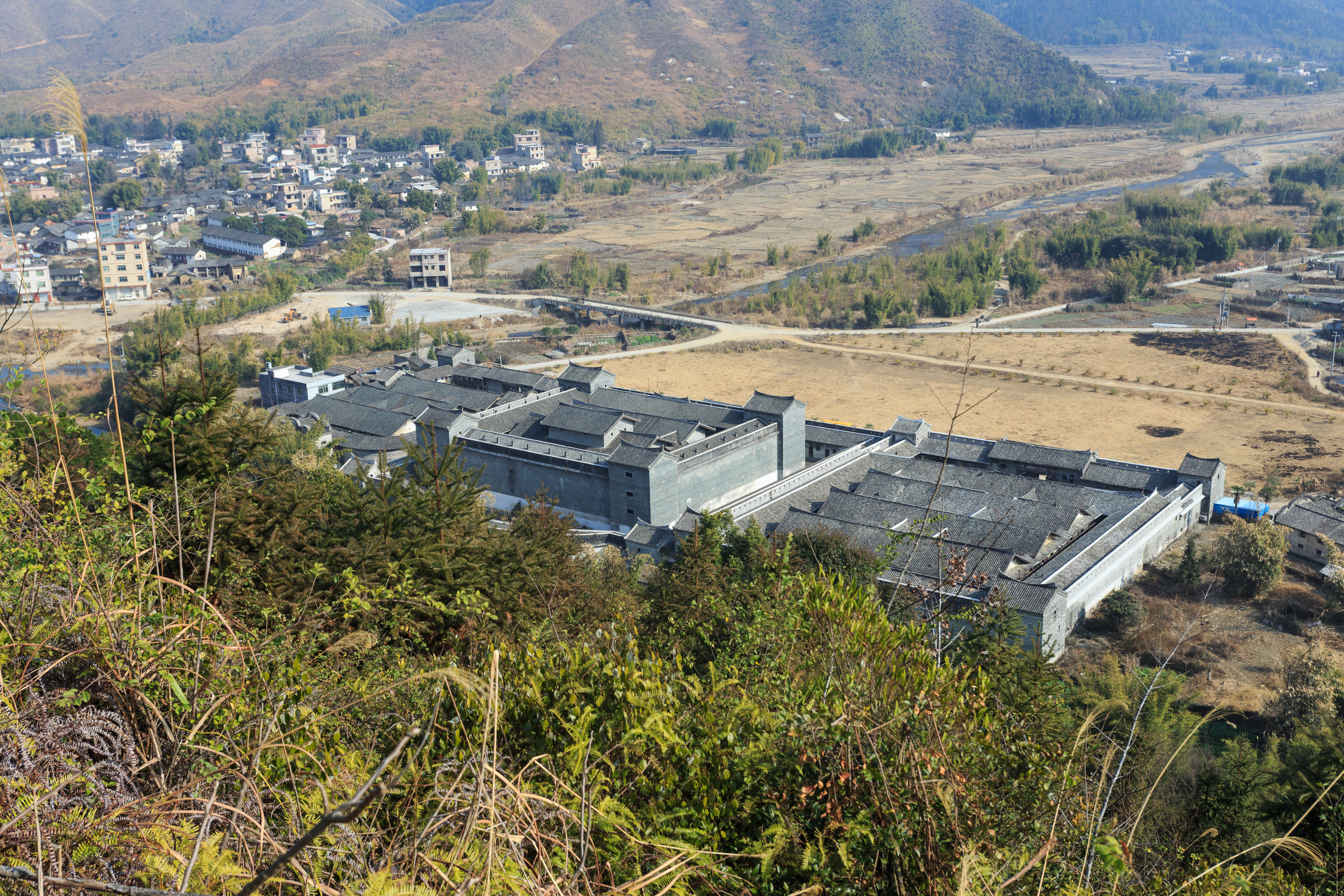
- Mantang Wei (满堂围), a fortified Hakka settlement in Aizi, Shixing County

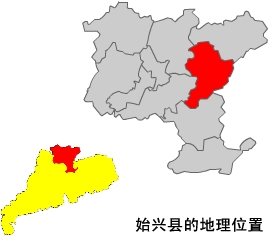
- Location of Shixing in Shaoguan (grey); Shaoguan in Guangdong (yellow)
- Coordinates: 24°50′33″N 114°08′37″E
- Country: People's Republic of China
- Province: Guangdong
- Prefecture-level city: Shaoguan

Area
  - Total: 2,174 km^{2} (839 sq mi)

Population (2020)
  - Total: 198,060
  - Density: 91.10/km^{2} (236.0/sq mi)
- Time zone: UTC+8 (China Standard)

Shixing County
- Traditional Chinese: 始興縣
- Simplified Chinese: 始兴县
- Postal: Chihing
- Literal meaning: County of Beginning Happiness
Transcriptions
Standard Mandarin
- Hanyu Pinyin: Shǐxìng Xiàn
- Wade–Giles: Shih-hsing Hsien

Shixing County is a county of Shaoguan Prefecture in northern Guangdong Province in southeastern China. It borders Jiangxi Province to the east and Nanxiong Prefecture to the northeast.

== History ==
Under the name "Suytjeen", the valleys of Shixing around the Zhen River were lavished with effusive praise in the 17th-century travelogue of the Dutchman Johan Nieuhof, who found it full of flowers and orchards.

== Culture ==
The indigenous dialect of Chinese in the area is Shaozhou Tuhua but more current inhabitants speak varieties of Hakka following their settlement of the area.

== Climate ==
Climate data for Shixing, elevation 144 m (472 ft), (1991–2020 normals, extremes 1981–present)
| Month | Jan | Feb | Mar | Apr | May | Jun | Jul | Aug | Sep | Oct | Nov | Dec | Year |
|---|---|---|---|---|---|---|---|---|---|---|---|---|---|
| Record high °C (°F) | 27.7 (81.9) | 31.5 (88.7) | 33.5 (92.3) | 34.7 (94.5) | 36.1 (97.0) | 37.5 (99.5) | 39.9 (103.8) | 40.4 (104.7) | 38.2 (100.8) | 39.8 (103.6) | 33.6 (92.5) | 29.9 (85.8) | 40.4 (104.7) |
| Mean daily maximum °C (°F) | 14.7 (58.5) | 17.1 (62.8) | 19.7 (67.5) | 25.4 (77.7) | 29.3 (84.7) | 31.9 (89.4) | 34.3 (93.7) | 33.8 (92.8) | 31.3 (88.3) | 27.7 (81.9) | 22.6 (72.7) | 17.0 (62.6) | 25.4 (77.7) |
| Daily mean °C (°F) | 9.9 (49.8) | 12.2 (54.0) | 15.3 (59.5) | 20.7 (69.3) | 24.5 (76.1) | 27.0 (80.6) | 28.6 (83.5) | 28.2 (82.8) | 25.8 (78.4) | 21.7 (71.1) | 16.7 (62.1) | 11.3 (52.3) | 20.2 (68.3) |
| Mean daily minimum °C (°F) | 6.6 (43.9) | 8.9 (48.0) | 12.3 (54.1) | 17.4 (63.3) | 21.1 (70.0) | 23.8 (74.8) | 24.7 (76.5) | 24.6 (76.3) | 22.2 (72.0) | 17.3 (63.1) | 12.4 (54.3) | 7.3 (45.1) | 16.6 (61.8) |
| Record low °C (°F) | −3.8 (25.2) | −1.8 (28.8) | −0.2 (31.6) | 5.6 (42.1) | 12.3 (54.1) | 14.9 (58.8) | 19.8 (67.6) | 20.8 (69.4) | 13.9 (57.0) | 5.4 (41.7) | 0.6 (33.1) | −6.0 (21.2) | −6.0 (21.2) |
| Average precipitation mm (inches) | 70.4 (2.77) | 88.6 (3.49) | 174.3 (6.86) | 194.4 (7.65) | 246.9 (9.72) | 224.9 (8.85) | 134.4 (5.29) | 153.3 (6.04) | 106.8 (4.20) | 52.9 (2.08) | 59.6 (2.35) | 52 (2.0) | 1,558.5 (61.3) |
| Average precipitation days (≥ 0.1 mm) | 11.0 | 12.2 | 17.8 | 16.8 | 17.9 | 17.7 | 14.2 | 14.9 | 11.2 | 6.5 | 7.9 | 8.1 | 156.2 |
| Average snowy days | 0.4 | 0.2 | 0 | 0 | 0 | 0 | 0 | 0 | 0 | 0 | 0 | 0.3 | 0.9 |
| Average relative humidity (%) | 75 | 77 | 82 | 81 | 82 | 82 | 78 | 80 | 79 | 75 | 75 | 74 | 78 |
| Mean monthly sunshine hours | 87.0 | 74.8 | 65.3 | 84.4 | 116.1 | 136.1 | 207.3 | 196.3 | 164.2 | 164.1 | 137.1 | 127.1 | 1,559.8 |
| Percentage possible sunshine | 26 | 23 | 18 | 22 | 28 | 33 | 50 | 49 | 45 | 46 | 42 | 39 | 35 |
Source: China Meteorological Administration all-time October record
