= Maba =

Maba or MABA may refer to:

- Maba, a plant genus now included in Diospyros
- Maba, Shaoguan (马坝镇), town in Qujiang District, Shaoguan, Guangdong, China
- Maba, Xuyi County (马坝镇), town in Xuyi County, Jiangsu, China
- Maba, Indonesia, town in North Maluku
- Maba language (Indonesia), an Austronesian language of Indonesia
- Maba language, a Nilo-Saharan language of Chad and Sudan
- Maba people, an ethnic group of Chad
- Maba Man, a prehistoric hominid from Maba, Guangdong, China
- Maba, Thung Khao Luang, an administrative division in Thung Khao Luang District, Thailand
- 3-Aminobenzoic acid, an organic compound
- Mandi Bamora railway station, in Madhya Pradesh, India
