= Nanhua Temple =

Buddhist monastery in Guangdong, China

- 南华寺
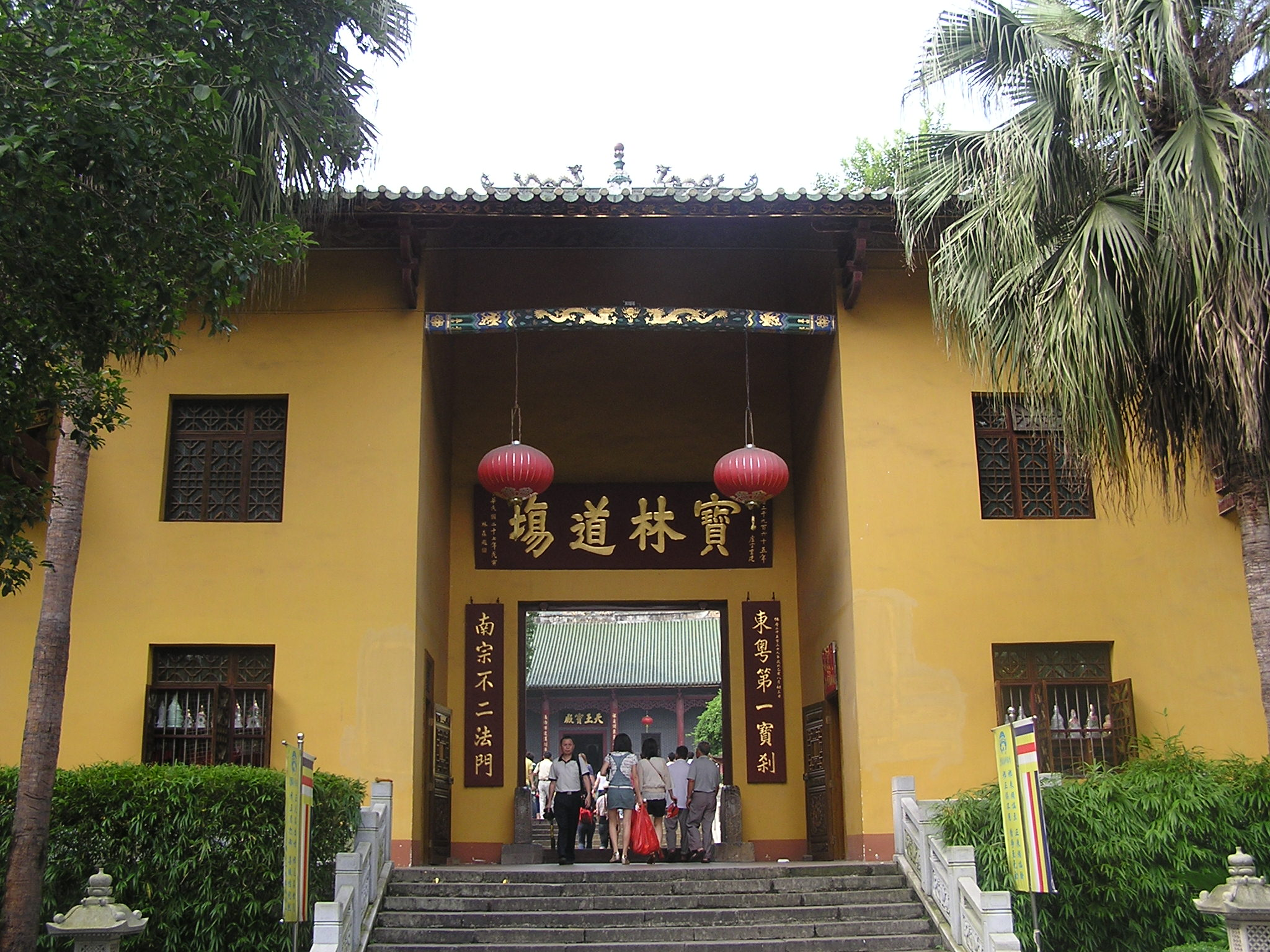
- Shanmen at Nanhua Temple.

- Location within Guangdong

Religion
- Affiliation: Buddhism
- Sect: Chan Buddhism

Location
- Location: Maba, Qujiang District, Shaoguan, Guangdong
- Country: China
- Coordinates: 24°38′57″N 113°37′53″E

Architecture
- Style: Chinese architecture
- Founder: Zhiyao Sanzang (智樂三藏)
- Established: 502

Nanhua Temple (simplified Chinese: 南华寺; traditional Chinese: 南華寺; pinyin: Nánhuá Sì; Jyutping: naam4 waa4 zi6*2) is a Buddhist monastery of the Chan Buddhism, one of Five Great Schools of Buddhism where Huineng, the Sixth Patriarch of Chan Buddhism, once lived and taught. It is located in the town of Maba (马坝镇), Qujiang District, 25 km (16 mi) southeast of central Shaoguan, Guangdong province. The location is in the northern part of the province, within a few kilometers from the Bei River.

== History ==
The temple was founded during the time of the Northern and Southern dynasties in 502 AD by an Indian monk named Zhiyao Sanzang (智藥三藏) who originally named the site Baolin Temple (寶林寺). It received its present name in 968 during the reign of the Song dynasty Emperor Taizong. Ancestor Hanshan Deqing taught there and reformed the monastery in the 16th century. The site was later renovated in 1934 under the leadership of Xuyun whose body is housed in the central forest sanctuary. Recent changes to the site include the building of extensive monastic accommodations.

== Architecture ==
The temple covers an area of more than 42.5 hectares (105 acres). It consists of a set of magnificent Buddhist buildings, including the Hall of Four Heavenly Kings, Mahavira Hall, Zangjing Ge, Sixth Ancestor Hall, Lingzhao Pagoda and 690 Buddhist statues.

There are nine Chinese swamp cypresses (Glyptostrobus pensilis) believed to be 400 to 500 years old in the temple.

=== Caoxi Gate ===
Inside the Caoxi Gate (曹溪门), a plaque with the Chinese characters "Nanhua Chan Temple" (南华禅寺) hanging on the door lintel written by the former President of Chinese Buddhist Association, the late Upasaka Zhao Puchu.

=== Hall of Heavenly Kings ===
The majestic Hall of Heavenly Kings was originally built in 1474 during the Ming dynasty (1368–1644) and rebuilt during the Qing dynasty (1644–1911). The statue of the bodhisattva Mi Le is enshrined in the hall and the mighty statues of the Four Heavenly Kings holding religious objects stand on both sides of the statue of Mi Le. Behind the hall is a three-storey bell tower which was constructed in 1301 during the Yuan dynasty (1271–1368). On top of the bell tower there hangs a brass bell from the Southern Song dynasty (1127–1279). The massive bell is 2.75 meters (9.0 feet) high with a diameter of 1.8 meters (5.9 feet).

=== Mahavira Hall ===
The Mahavira Hall, constructed during the Yuan dynasty (1271–1368), stands in the center of the temple. Covered by glazed tiles, it houses the Buddha statues of Shijiamouni, Yaoshi, and Amituofo, which are situated in the sacrarium of the hall. These gilded figures are all over 8.3 meters (27 feet) high. Within the Mahavira Hall there are about 500 fine clay sculptures of Buddhist arhats.

The temple holds many precious cultural relics; the most precious being the statue of Huineng, which is worshiped in the Sixth Ancestor Hall and the body of Hanshan. There are 360 Buddhist arhat figures which are the only Chinese wooden carvings preserved from the Northern Song dynasty (960–1127) and a rare cassock trimmed with the dainty embroidery of over 1,000 Buddhist figures.

=== Early impressions by Jesuits ===
The first account of Nanhua Temple for the European audience was most likely provided by Matteo Ricci, who visited it in August or September 1589, when relocating from Zhaoqing to Shaoguan. The Jesuit was impressed by the temple, "magnificent in grandeur", and its fountain, "graciously designed and wonderfully built", as well as by the beautiful surroundings, but viewed the "idol-worshipping emissaries of the Satan" (i.e., the Buddhist clergy) with disdain and prejudice. He saw the relics of the Sixth Patriarch (Lusu, i.e. 六祖, Liu Zu, in Ricci's account) as well. The local authorities had suggested to the missionaries (Ricci and his younger colleague, Antonio Almeida) that they can find a place to live on the temple compound, but they strongly preferred to live in the city instead, closer to the region's ruling elites.
