= Shaoguan =

Shaoguan 韶关市 Shiukwan
- Prefecture-level city
- Shaoguan Shi
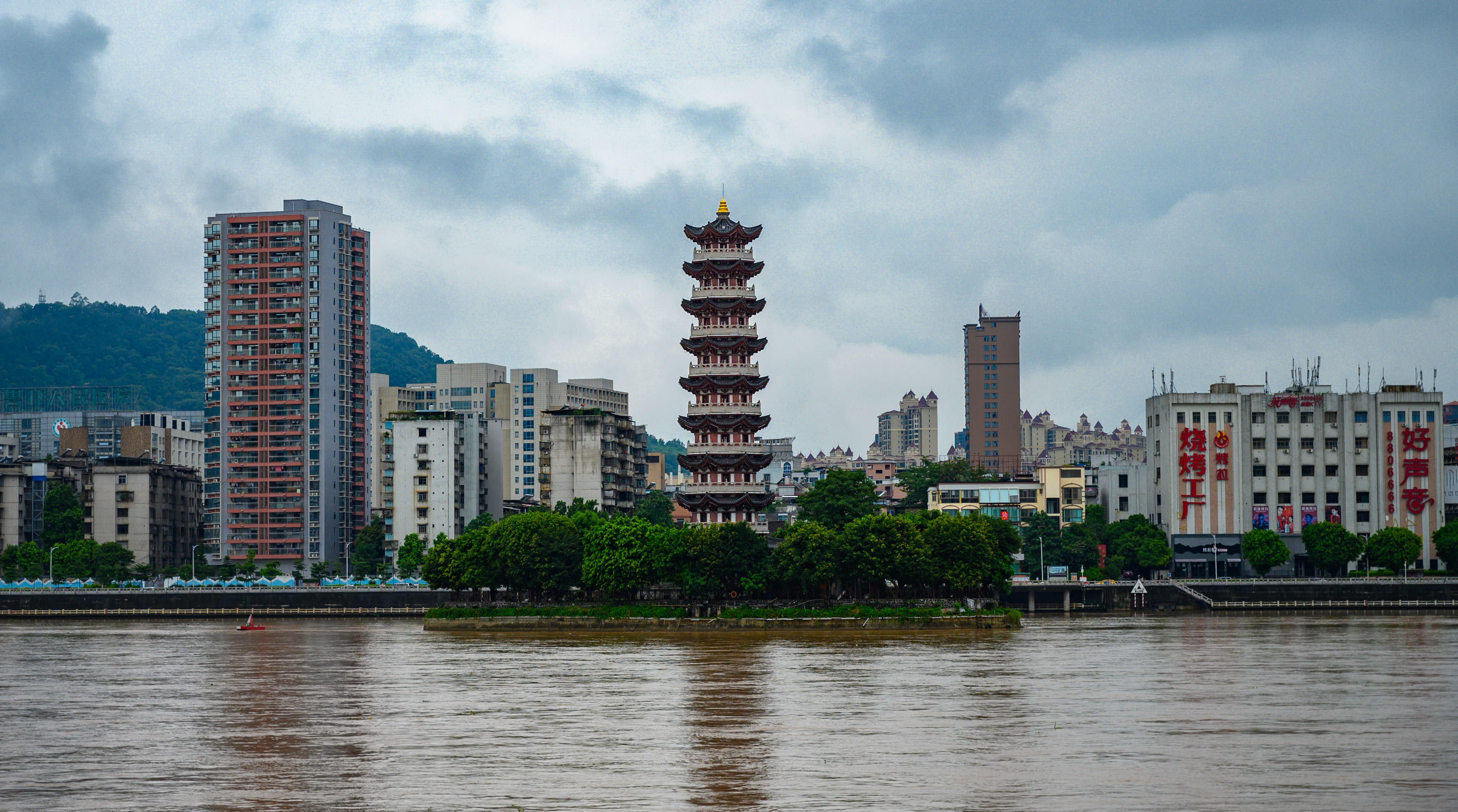
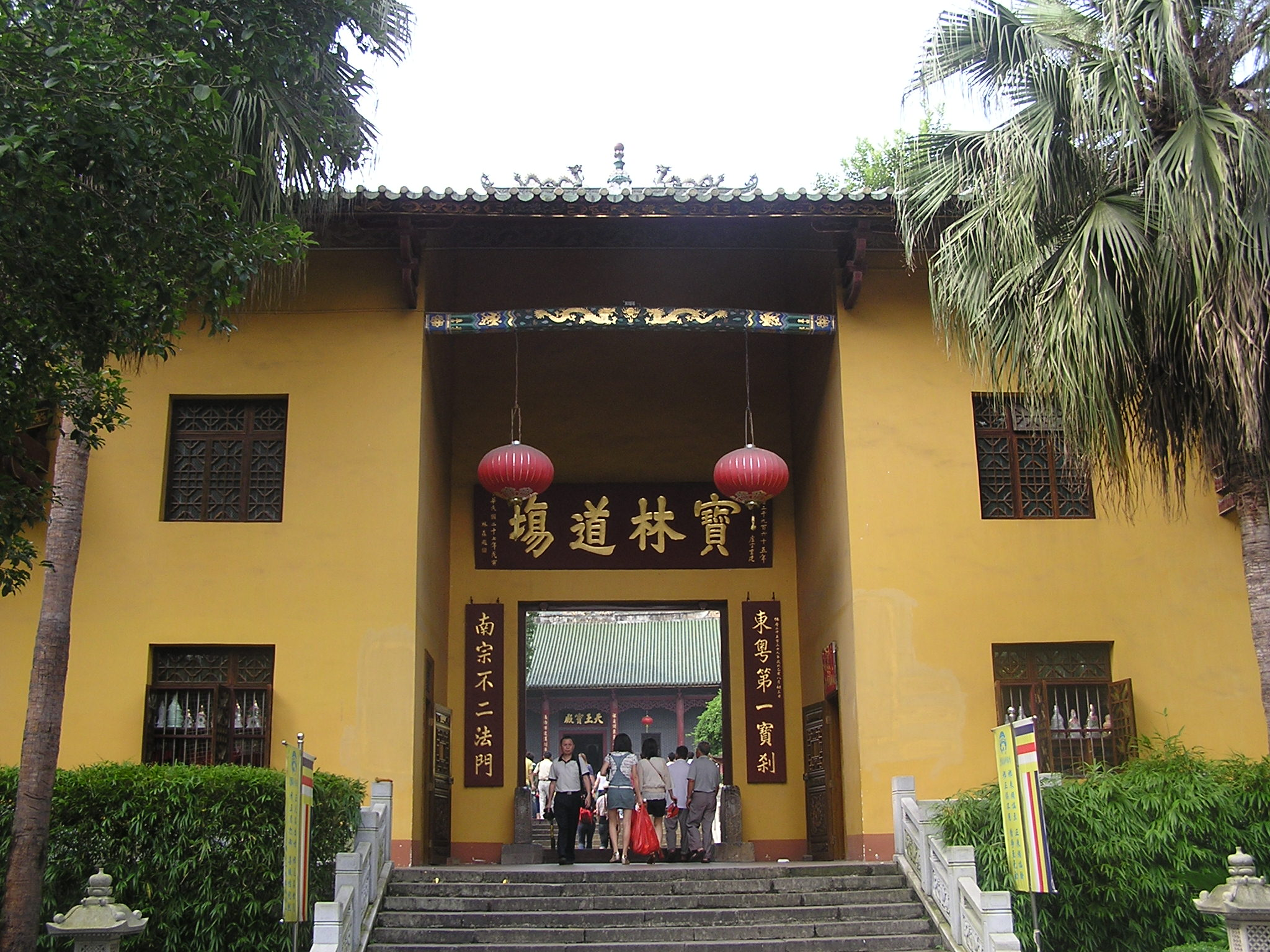
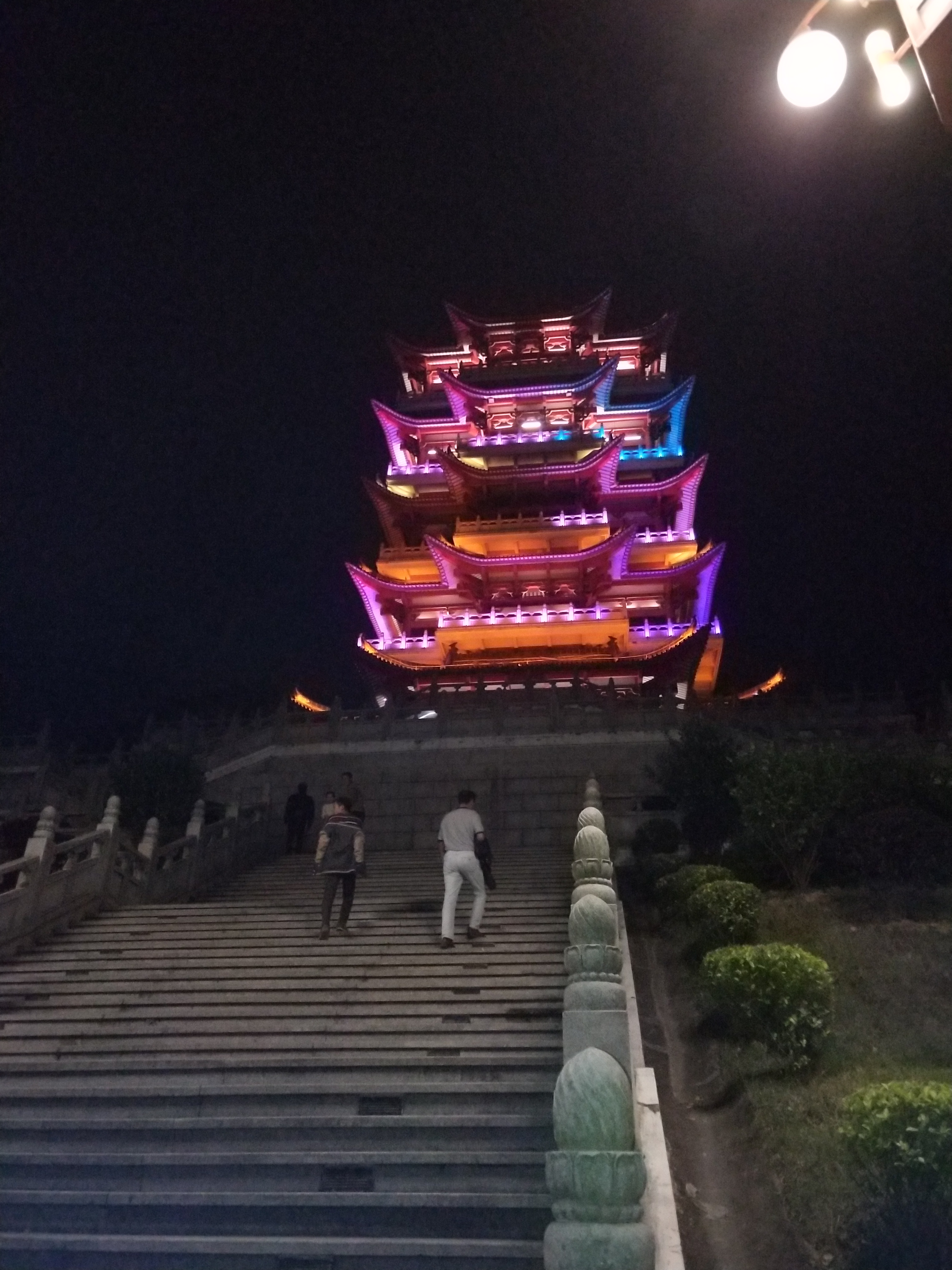
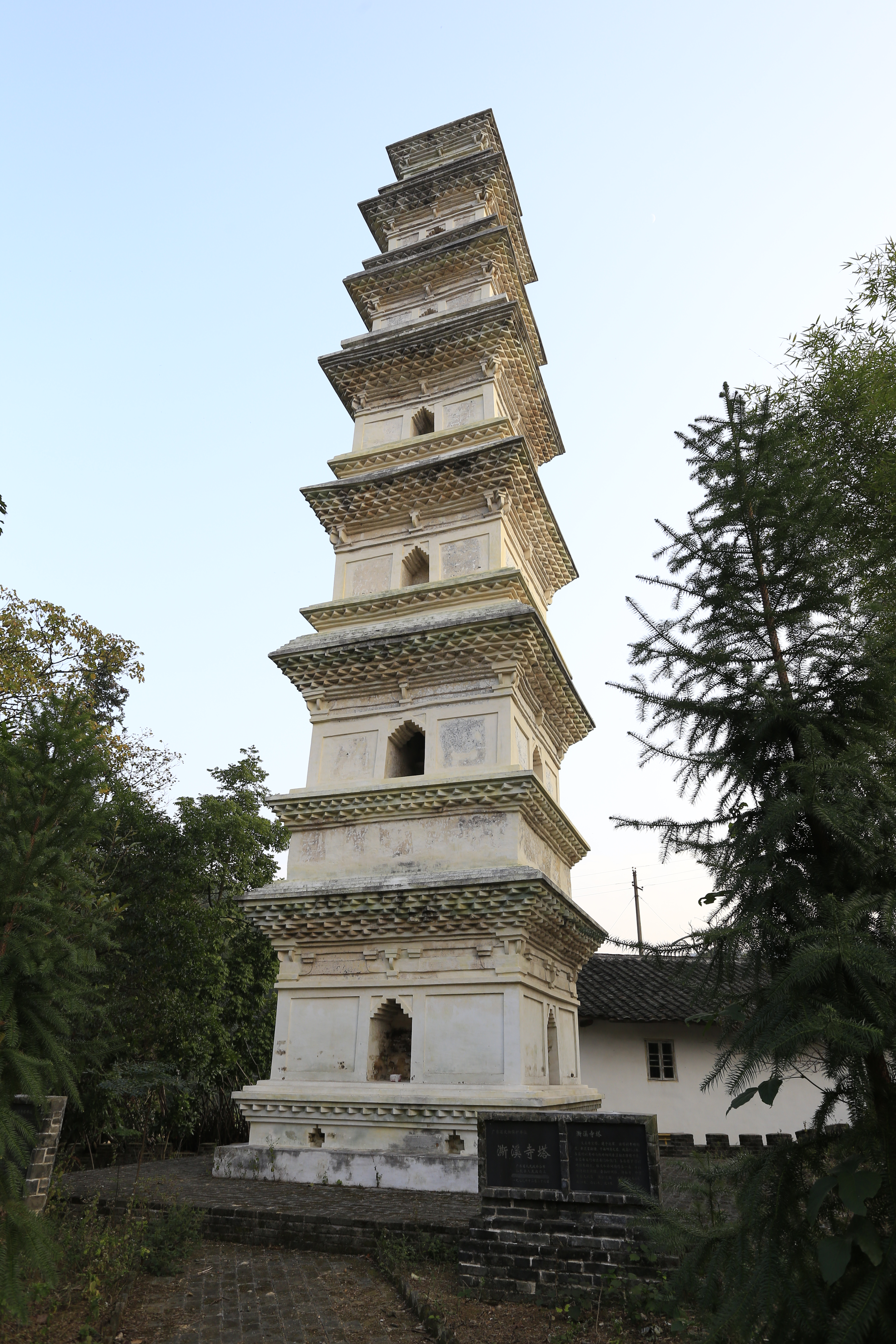
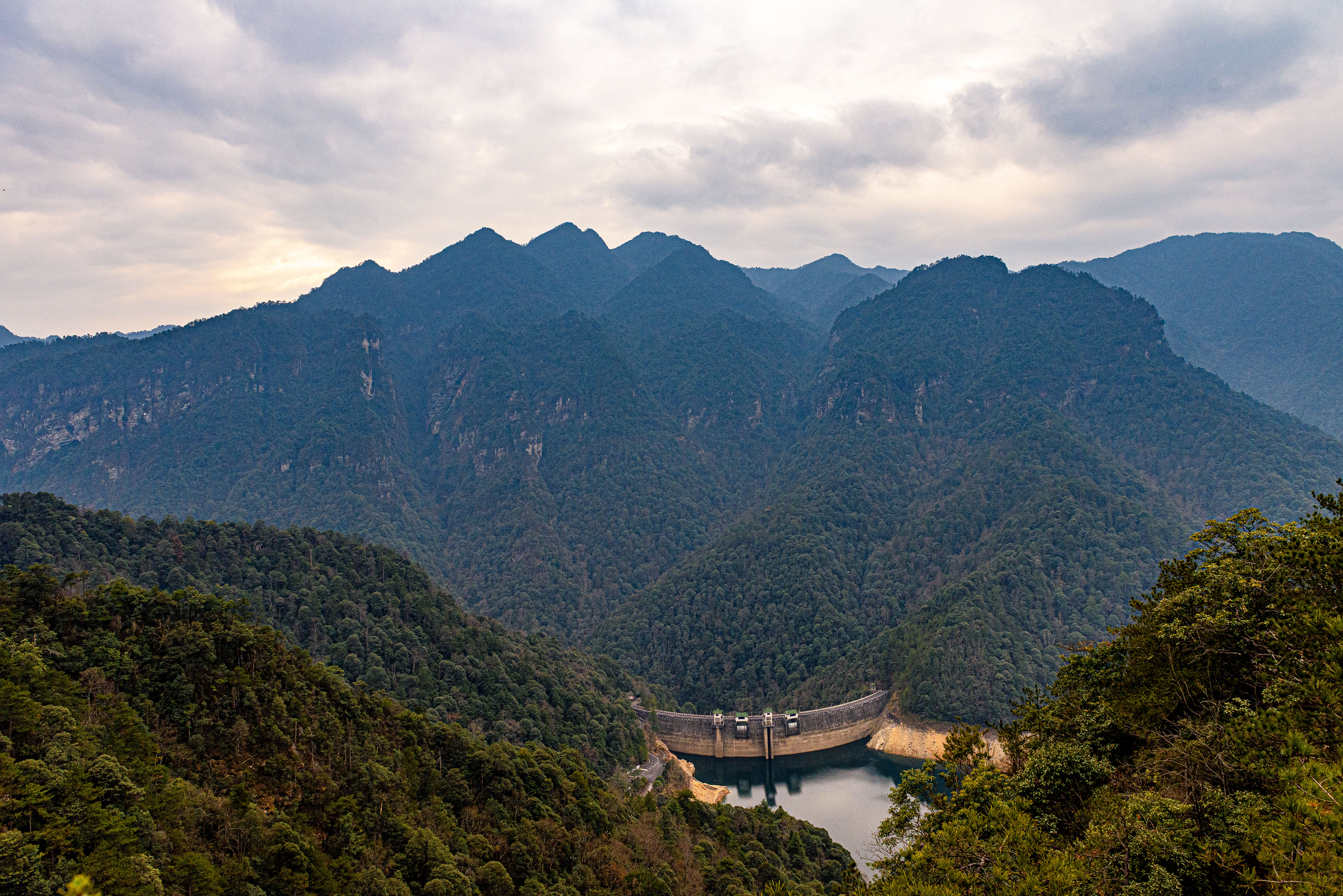
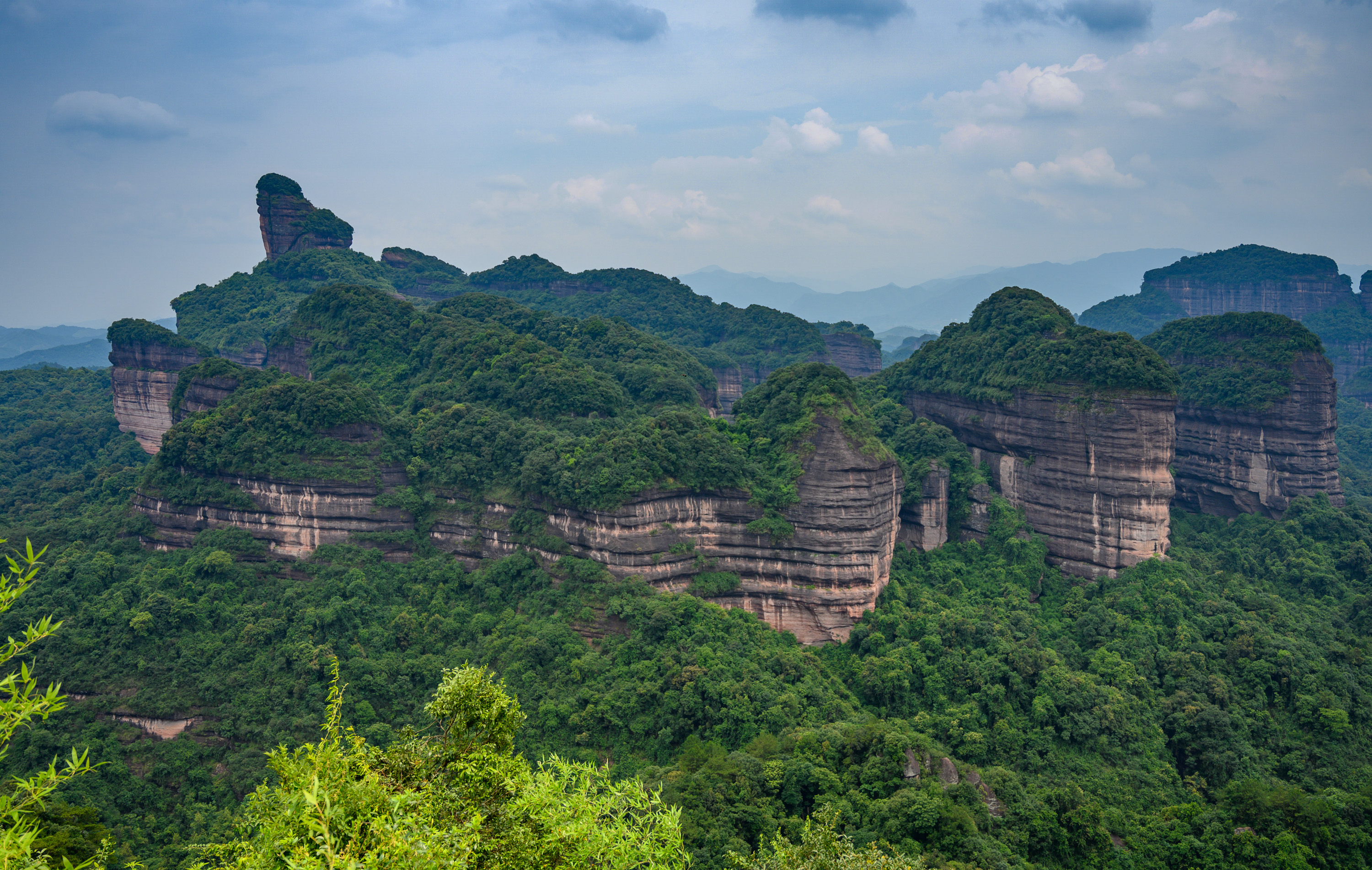
- Tongtian Pagoda Nanhua Temple Shaoyang Tower Pagoda of Sixi Temple Wuzhi Peak Mount Danxia

- Location of Shaoguan City jurisdiction in Guangdong
- Interactive map of Shaoguan
- Location of the city center in Guangdong Shaoguan (China)
- Coordinates (Shaoguan municipal government): 24°48′40″N 113°35′49″E
- Country: People's Republic of China
- Province: Guangdong
- County-level divisions: 10
- Municipal seat: Zhenjiang District

Government
  - CPC Secretary: Chen Jinluan(陈金銮)
  - Mayor: Wu Qinghua(吴庆华)

Area
  - Prefecture-level city: 18,645 km^{2} (7,199 sq mi)
  - Urban: 2,870.7 km^{2} (1,108.4 sq mi)
  - Metro: 2,870.7 km^{2} (1,108.4 sq mi)
- Elevation: 59 m (194 ft)

Population (2020 census)
  - Prefecture-level city: 2,855,131
  - Density: 153.13/km^{2} (396.61/sq mi)
  - Urban: 1,028,460
  - Urban density: 358.26/km^{2} (927.89/sq mi)
  - Metro: 1,028,460
  - Metro density: 358.26/km^{2} (927.89/sq mi)

GDP
  - Prefecture-level city: CN¥ 155.4 billion US$ 24.1 billion
  - Per capita: CN¥ 54,377; US$ 8,429
- Time zone: UTC+8 (China Standard)
- Postal code: 512000
- Area code: (0)751
- ISO 3166 code: CN-GD-02
- Licence plate prefixes: 粤F
- Local dialect: Hakka (regional); Cantonese (native; provincial level)
- Major Nationalities: Han

Shaoguan
- "Shaoguan" in Traditional (top) and Simplified (bottom) Chinese characters
- Simplified Chinese: 韶关
- Traditional Chinese: 韶關
- Postal: Shiukwan
- Literal meaning: Beautiful Pass/Checkpoint
Transcriptions
Standard Mandarin
- Hanyu Pinyin: Sháoguān
- Gwoyeu Romatzyh: Shaurguan
- Wade–Giles: Shao-kuan
- IPA: [ʂǎʊ.kwán]
Wu
- Romanization: zau^{1}kuae^{1}
Hakka
- Romanization: Shâu-kûan
Yue: Cantonese
- Yale Romanization: Sìuhgwāan
- Jyutping: Siu4gwaan1
- IPA: [siw˩.kʷan˥]

Shaozhou
- Chinese: 韶州
- Postal: Shiuchow
- Literal meaning: [Seat of the] Beautiful Prefecture
Transcriptions
Standard Mandarin
- Hanyu Pinyin: Sháozhōu
- Wade–Giles: Shao-chou

Shaoguan is a prefecture-level city in northern Guangdong Province (Yuebei), South China, bordering Hunan to the northwest and Jiangxi to the northeast. It is home to the mummified remains of the sixth Zen Buddhist patriarch Huineng. Its built-up (or metro) area made up of Zhenjiang, Wujiang and Qujiang urban districts was home to 1,028,460 inhabitants as of the 2020 census.

== History ==
Under the First Emperor, the northern Chinese invaded Guangdong, then held by various Baiyue tribes, and by the Han Dynasty the region was being heavily sinicized. The Lingqu Canal connected the Yangtze and Pearl River systems via the Xi or West River but Qujiang grew up at the confluence of the Wu and Zhen Rivers where they form the Bei or North River. The Bei and Zhen Rivers became a second important route connecting Guangdong with northern China, with only a relatively short portage required between Nanxiong and Nankang.

Under the Southern Liang, an Indian monk established Nanhua Monastery nearby and, under the Tang, the area was home to the ascetic Chan Buddhist patriarch Huineng, whose relics are still venerated.

Under the Tang and Song, Qujiang was elevated to serve as the seat of Shao Prefecture or Shaozhou.

In 1589, Matteo Ricci relocated his mission house – the first ever Jesuit mission in mainland China – to Shaoguan after a fallout with the authorities in Zhaoqing. He remained in Shaoguan for a few years, eventually benefiting from Shaoguan's location on the important north–south travel route to establish connections with traveling dignitaries that allowed him to move north, to Nanchang, Nanjing, and Beijing. In the 1650s, it was along the route of the Dutch embassy related by Nieuhof.

Owing to the Chinese Postal Map's romanization system, the local pronunciation of Qujiang caused the city to be known as Kukong during the late 19th and early 20th centuries. During World War II, the city was the temporary capital of Guangdong Province after Guangzhou was invaded by Imperial Japan. In the 1950s, farmers discovered the partial skull of the Maba Man, an East Asian hominid who had lived in the area between 300–100,000 years ago and possessed a cranial size similar to Neanderthals and modern humans.

The Shaoguan Incident in June 2009 was a clash between migrant Uyghur and Han workers at a toy factory in Shaoguan, contributing in part to the Ürümqi riots the next month.

== Culture ==
Shaozhou Tuhua, the distinct local dialect of Shaoguan and the surrounding prefecture, is mutually unintelligible with Mandarin, Cantonese, and Xiang. It is so distinct that its origin and classification are a matter of unsettled scholarly debate. Despite the literal translation of "tuhua" as "dirt" or "rural speech", however, Shaozhou Tuhua is now more common in urban areas while rural communities are more likely to use Hakka dialects, mainly Yetpet and Seunan.

A notable expatriate community of Shaoguanese is located in Nam Dinh, Vietnam. Present from the city's founding under French rule, their Shaozhou or Seochew candy (kẹo sìu-châu), sweet-meat xoi (xôi xá-xíu), and sweet-meat pho (phở xá-xíu) have become the town's most famous delicacies and are still produced in the city's old town area by families with longstanding roots to northern Guangdong.

=== Tourism ===
The most prominent feature of early modern Shaoguan was the slender Ming-era Tongtian Pagoda at the confluence of the Wu and Zhen Rivers. This was destroyed during the 19th-century Taiping Rebellion but a replacement was erected in 2012, along with a display of the foundations of the former tower. The Fengcai Tower (风采楼) in central Shaoguan was also built under the Ming. The Dajian Monastery, founded in 660, lies nearby at the opposite end of a pedestrian shopping street.

Mount Danxia in Renhua County is both a national geopark and a UNESCO World Heritage Site. The Nine Torrents and Eighteen Shoals in Pingshi is popular for white-water rafting.

The town of Maba in Qujiang District has a museum dedicated to Maba Man and Nanhua Temple, closely associated with Huineng, the Sixth Patriarch of Zen Buddhism.

=== Miscellaneous ===
The city is served by Shaoguan Danxia Airport. Shaoguan University and Shaoguan Iron and Steel are located in the city.

=== Notable people ===
- Huineng, the Sixth Patriarch (Liuzu) of Chan Buddhism (c. 7th cent.)
- Zhang Jiuling (張九齡): a high-ranking official of the Tang dynasty. (618–907)
- Yu Jing (余靖): a high-ranking official of the Northern Song dynasty. (960–1127)
- Chu Siu Hung (朱韶洪): Hong Kong social activist
- Regina Ho Yee Ting (何依婷): Winner of 2017 Miss Hong Kong pageant, also an actress of Hong Kong

== Geography ==
Shaoguan is the northernmost prefecture-level city of Guangdong, bordering Chenzhou (Hunan) to the northwest and north, Ganzhou (Jiangxi) to the northeast, Heyuan to the east, Guangzhou and Huizhou to the south, and Qingyuan to the west. It spans latitude 23° 53'−25° 31' N and longitude 112° 53'−114° 45' E. It is situated at the southern end of the Nan Mountains (Nan Ling), which primarily run east–west here, and is marked by numerous erosion-created valleys; within its borders lies the 1,902 m (6,240 ft) Mount Shikeng (石坑崆), the highest point in the province. The city is located on the Jingguang Railway (Beijing−Guangzhou) about 221 kilometres (137 mi) north of the provincial capital of Guangzhou. Shaoguan is also readily accessible by road as it is adjacent to the G4 Beijing–Hong Kong and Macau Expressway as well as numerous other National Highways.

At Shaoguan, the Wu River from the northwest and the Zhen River from the northeast join up to create the North River (Bei Jiang) which flows south to Guangzhou. The downtown part of Shaoguan is located on a peninsula between the Wu and Zhen Rivers. The rivers are maintained at a constant level by a dam about 12 kilometres (7.5 mi) downstream from the city. The city has about 20 kilometres (12 mi) of tree-lined riverside esplanades along the banks of the rivers. There are seven bridges crossing the three rivers.

=== Administration ===
Shaoguan has direct jurisdiction over 3 districts, 2 county-level cities and 5 counties:

Map	Name	Simplified Chinese	Hanyu Pinyin	Population (2010 census)	Area (km^{2})	Density (/km^{2})
	Zhenjiang District	浈江区	Zhēnjiāng Qū	393,521	572.11	688
	Wujiang District	武江区	Wǔjiāng Qū	294,708	677.78	435
	Qujiang District	曲江区	Qǔjiāng Qū	303,371	1,620.77	187
	Shixing County	始兴县	Shǐxīng Xiàn	205,452	2,131.91	96
	Renhua County	仁化县	Rénhuà Xiàn	200,354	2,223.22	99
	Wengyuan County	翁源县	Wēngyuán Xiàn	331,120	2,174.87	152
	Xinfeng County	新丰县	Xīnfēng Xiàn	206,091	1,967.39	105
	Ruyuan Yao Autonomous County	乳源瑶族自治县	Rǔyuán Yáozú Zìzhìxiàn	177,471	2,299.01	77
	Lechang City	乐昌市	Lèchāng Shì	397,779	2,419,28	164
	Nanxiong City	南雄市	Nánxióng Shì	316,179	2,326,18	136

=== Climate ===
Shaoguan has a monsoon-influenced humid subtropical climate (Köppen Cfa), with short, mild, damp winters, rainy springs, long, hot, and humid summers, and relatively sunny autumns. Due to the city's location far inland, winters are significantly cooler than in the rest of the province, with freezing rain possible in the nearby mountain passes in some years. Winter begins dry and relatively sunny but becomes progressively cloudier and damper. Spring is the cloudiest and wettest season, with the sun shining less than 30% of the time. The annual rainfall is around 1,600 mm (63 in), much of it delivered from April thru June. The monthly 24-hour average temperature ranges from 10.3 °C (50.5 °F) in January to 29.0 °C (84.2 °F) in July; the annual mean is 20.5 °C (68.9 °F). With monthly percent possible sunshine ranging from 16% in March to 54% in July, the city receives 1,617 hours of bright sunshine annually.

Climate data for Shaoguan, elevation 121 m (397 ft), (1991–2020 normals, extremes 1951–present)
Month	Jan	Feb	Mar	Apr	May	Jun	Jul	Aug	Sep	Oct	Nov	Dec	Year
Record high °C (°F)	28.0 (82.4)	30.6 (87.1)	32.6 (90.7)	35.4 (95.7)	38.8 (101.8)	39.3 (102.7)	40.4 (104.7)	42.0 (107.6)	39.2 (102.6)	38.9 (102.0)	34.0 (93.2)	30.6 (87.1)	42.0 (107.6)
Mean daily maximum °C (°F)	14.9 (58.8)	17.2 (63.0)	19.7 (67.5)	25.1 (77.2)	29.0 (84.2)	31.5 (88.7)	33.8 (92.8)	33.7 (92.7)	31.4 (88.5)	27.9 (82.2)	22.8 (73.0)	17.2 (63.0)	25.3 (77.6)
Daily mean °C (°F)	10.3 (50.5)	12.7 (54.9)	15.6 (60.1)	20.9 (69.6)	24.7 (76.5)	27.3 (81.1)	28.8 (83.8)	28.4 (83.1)	26.2 (79.2)	22.2 (72.0)	17.0 (62.6)	11.7 (53.1)	20.5 (68.9)
Mean daily minimum °C (°F)	7.2 (45.0)	9.6 (49.3)	12.8 (55.0)	17.8 (64.0)	21.6 (70.9)	24.4 (75.9)	25.4 (77.7)	24.9 (76.8)	22.6 (72.7)	18.1 (64.6)	13.1 (55.6)	8.0 (46.4)	17.1 (62.8)
Record low °C (°F)	−4.3 (24.3)	−2.2 (28.0)	0.9 (33.6)	5.4 (41.7)	10.8 (51.4)	14.6 (58.3)	20.1 (68.2)	20.1 (68.2)	13.8 (56.8)	6.3 (43.3)	1.6 (34.9)	−4.3 (24.3)	−4.3 (24.3)
Average precipitation mm (inches)	78.1 (3.07)	88.9 (3.50)	189.7 (7.47)	207.1 (8.15)	303.3 (11.94)	288.5 (11.36)	151.7 (5.97)	144.1 (5.67)	93.3 (3.67)	46.2 (1.82)	64.9 (2.56)	56.9 (2.24)	1,712.7 (67.42)
Average precipitation days (≥ 0.1 mm)	10.9	12.1	18.6	17.0	18.3	18.7	14.1	14.0	10.3	5.9	7.6	7.8	155.3
Average snowy days	0.4	0.1	0	0	0	0	0	0	0	0	0	0.2	0.7
Average relative humidity (%)	77	78	82	81	81	81	77	78	78	73	75	74	78
Mean monthly sunshine hours	87.2	77.7	66.8	88.5	123.9	145.8	214.1	198.8	171.9	171.4	137.5	125.8	1,609.4
Percentage possible sunshine	26	24	18	23	30	36	51	50	47	48	42	38	36
Source 1: China Meteorological Administration NOAA extremes
Source 2: Weather China

=== Landscapes ===
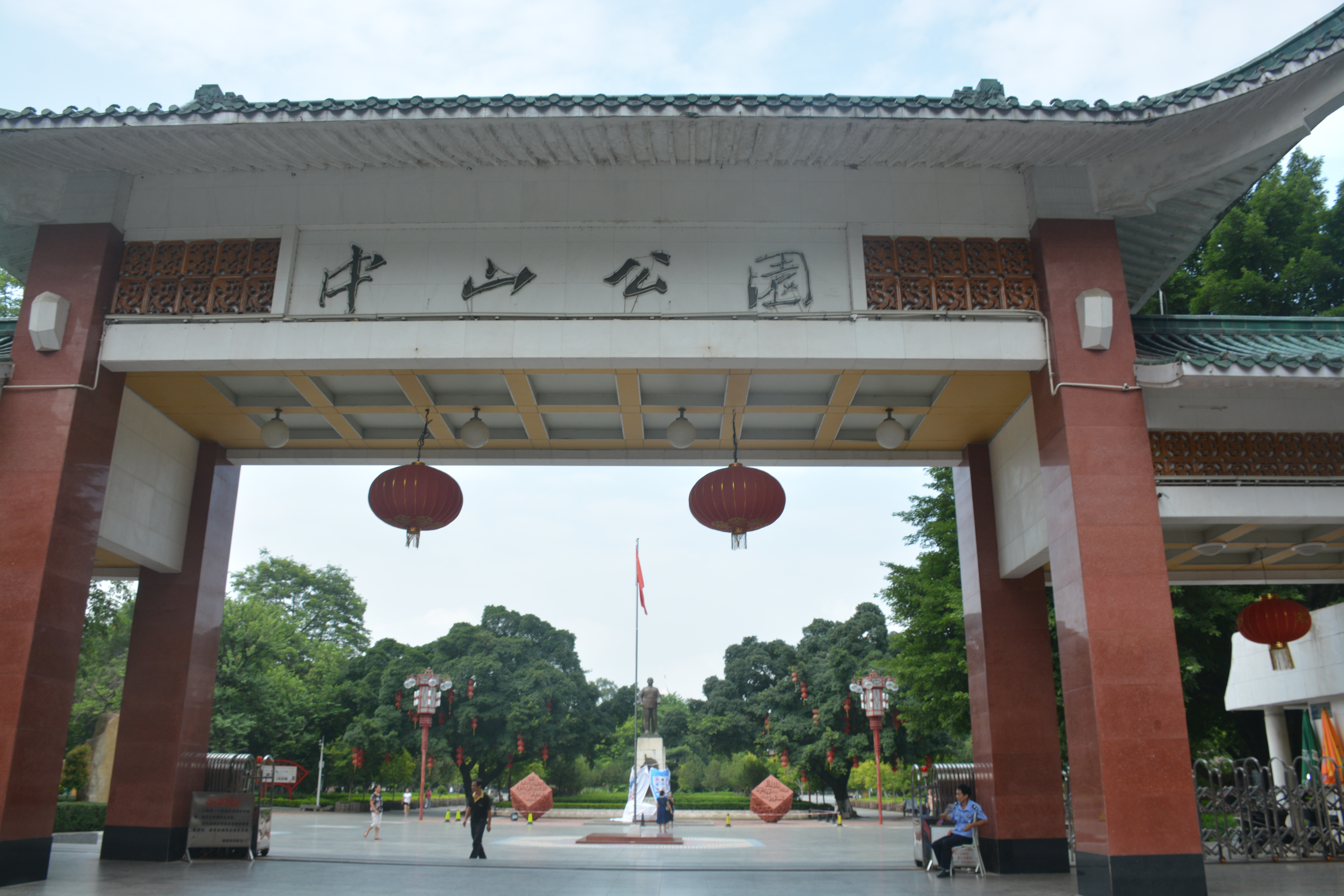
Zhongshan Park

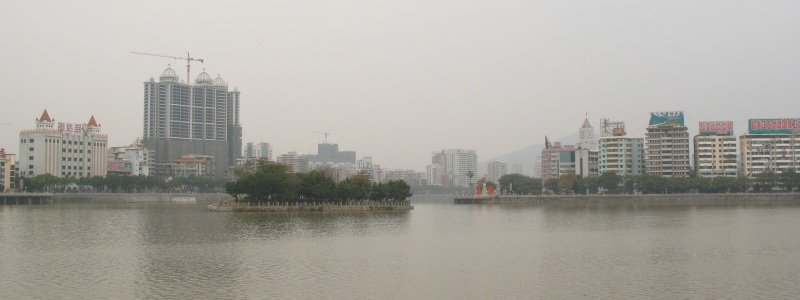
Central Shaoguan prior to the recreation of the Tongtian Pagoda

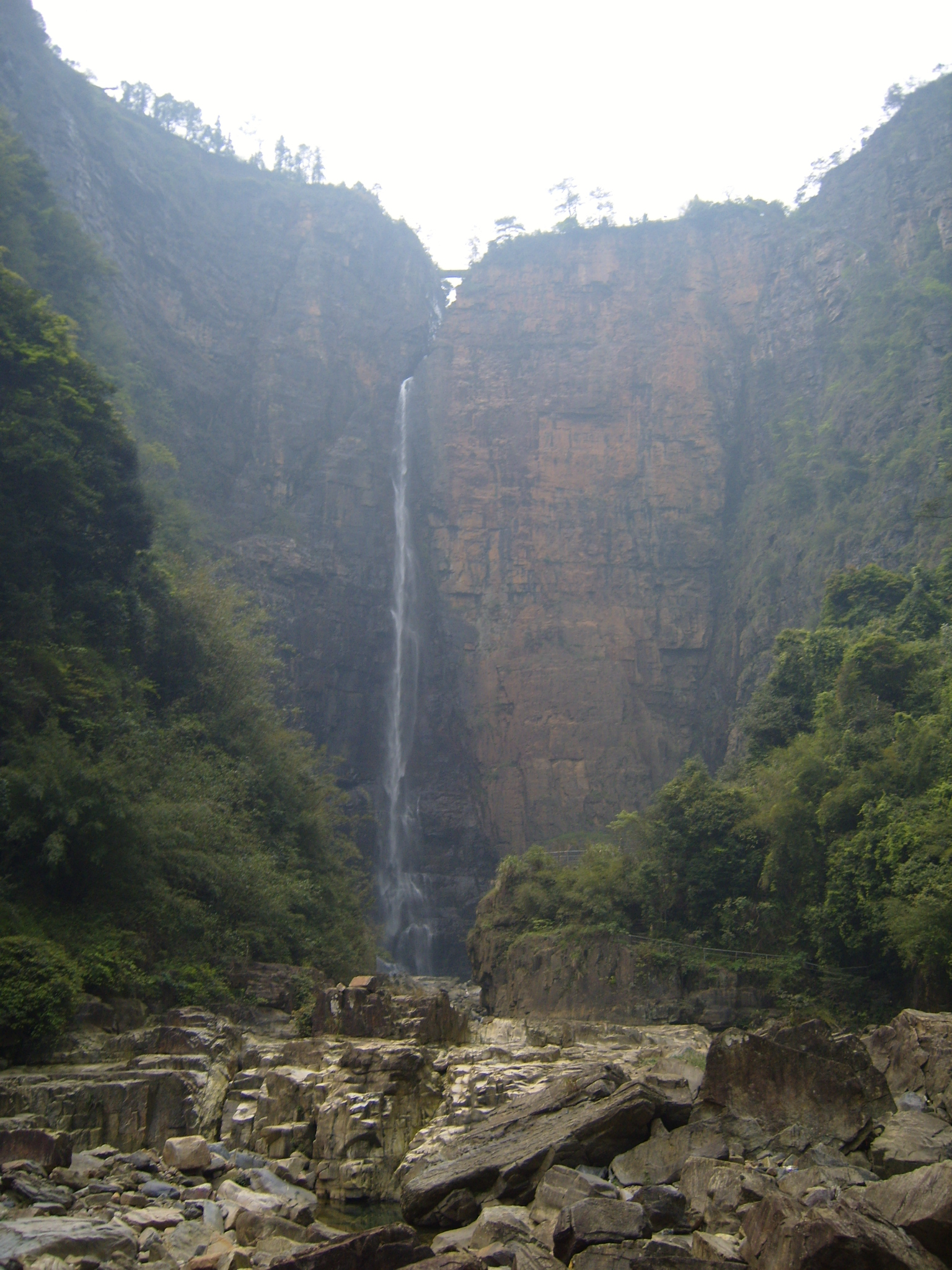
Guangdong Grand Canyon in Shaoguan

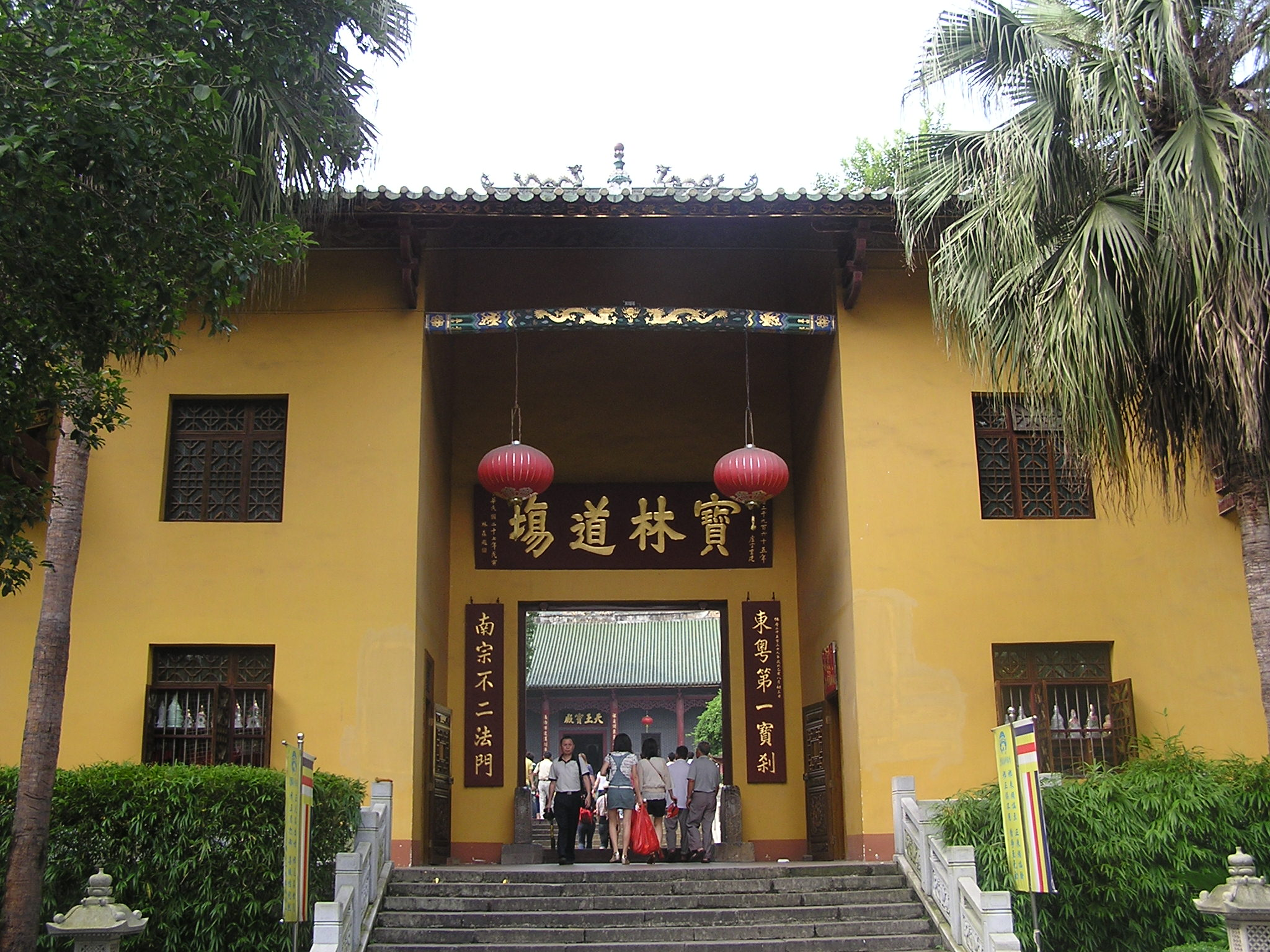
Nanhua Temple

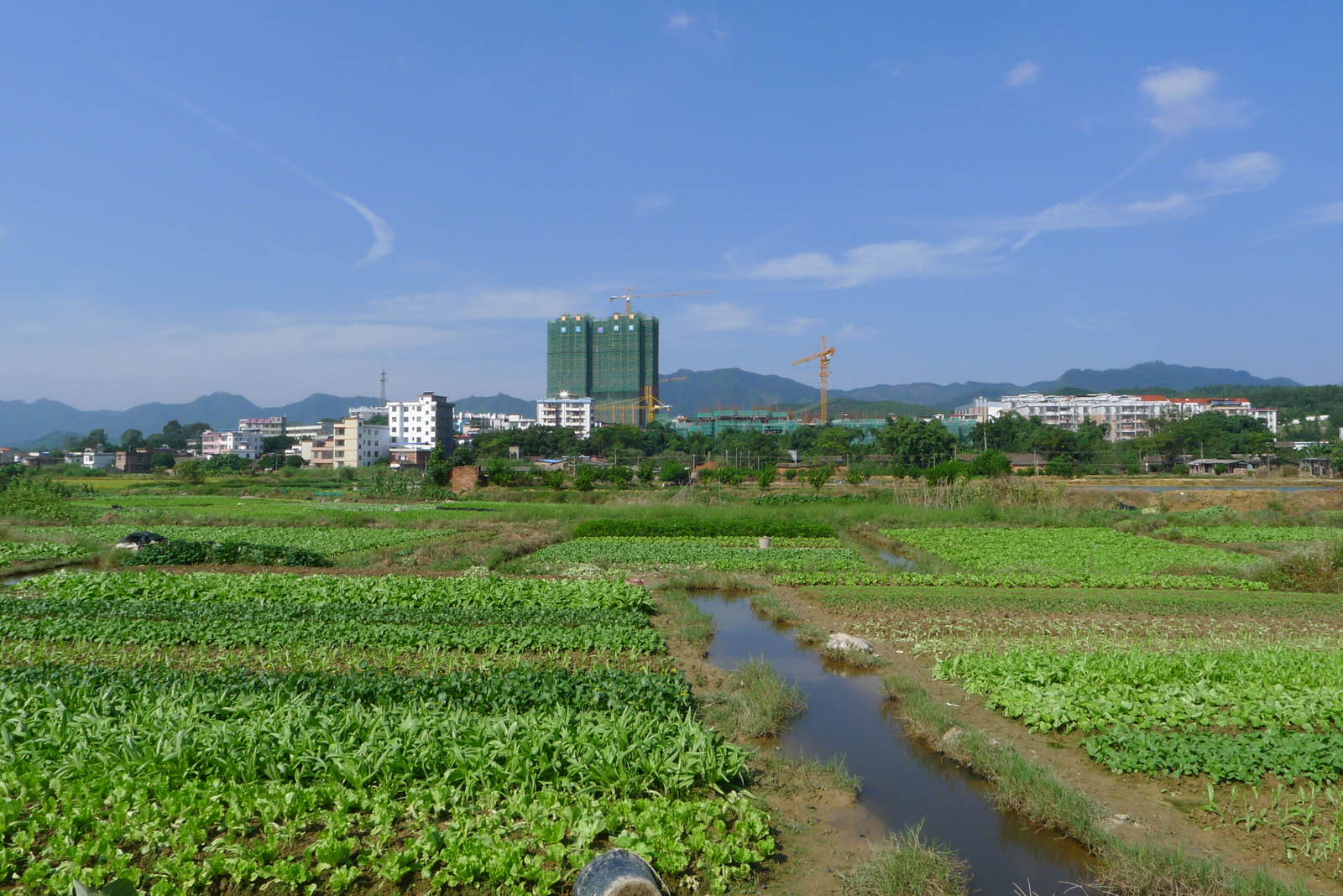
Fields in Shaoguan

== See also ==
- Dajian Huineng
- Hanshan Deqing
- Teochew people
