= Wujiang District =

Wujiang District may refer to:

- Wujiang District, Suzhou, Jiangsu, formerly Wujiang City
- Wujiang District, Shaoguan, Guangdong
