= Beijiang (disambiguation) =

Beijiang may refer to:

- Bei River (北江), a tributary of the Pearl River in southern China.
- Beijiang (北疆), a term for north part of Xinjiang Uyghur Autonomous Region of China. See Dzungaria.
