= Qujiang =

Qujiang is the atonal pinyin romanization for the Mandarin pronunciation of various Chinese placenames involving rivers (江).

It may refer several places in the People's Republic of China:

- Qujiang (曲江), a former name of Shaoguan, Guangdong
- Qujiang District, Shaoguan (曲江区), a specific district of the modern city
- Qujiang, Jiangxi (曲江镇), town in Fengcheng
- Qujiang District, Quzhou (衢江区), Zhejiang
- Qujiang, Yunnan (曲江镇), town in Jianshui County
- Qujiang New District, Xi'an, Shaanxi
- Qujiang Village, a tulou village in Shuyang, Nanjing County, Fujian (see also on Commons)
