= Tongtian Pagoda =

Pagoda in Shaoguan, Guangdong, China

Coordinates: 24°4′39.04″N 113°35′23.79″E

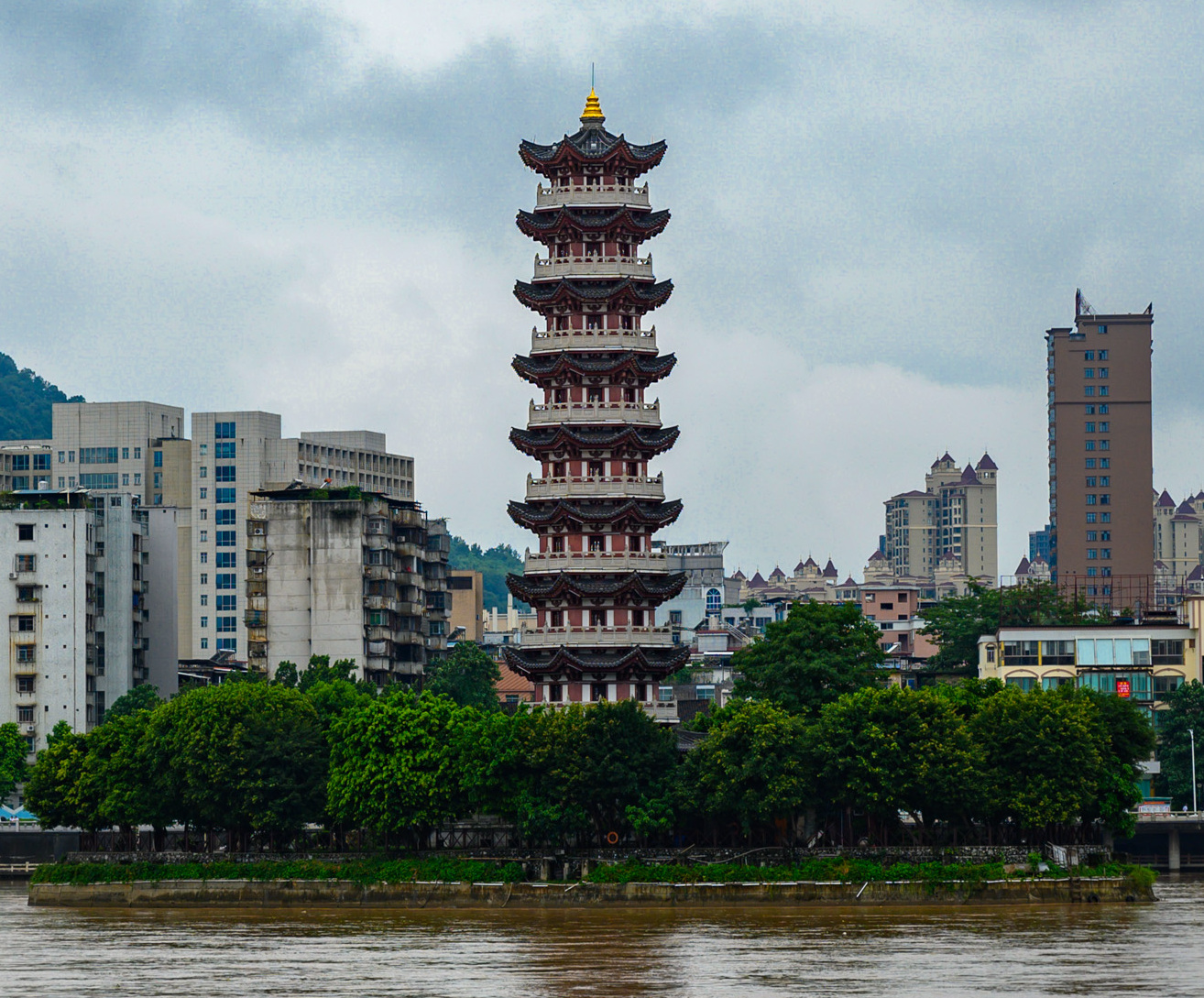
- The reconstructed pagoda in 2019
- Chinese: 通天塔
- Literal meaning: Tower of Passing; Through Heaven
Transcriptions
Standard Mandarin
- Hanyu Pinyin: Tōngtiāntǎ
- Wade–Giles: T'ung-t'ien-t'a

The Tongtian Pagoda is a 9-story Chinese pagoda located on Zhouxin Island in central Shaoguan, Guangdong, in southeastern China. It marks the confluence of the Wu and Zhen Rivers to form the Bei River, one of the principal affluents of the Pearl River.

== Name ==
In Chinese, 通天 (tōng tiān) literally means "passing through Heaven" but is also used idiomatically to mean awesome or having personal access to the highest levels of power. As pagodas are usually simply called towers (塔, tǎ) in Chinese, the same name is also used for the Tower of Babel from the biblical story of people attempting to use it to reach Heaven.

== History ==
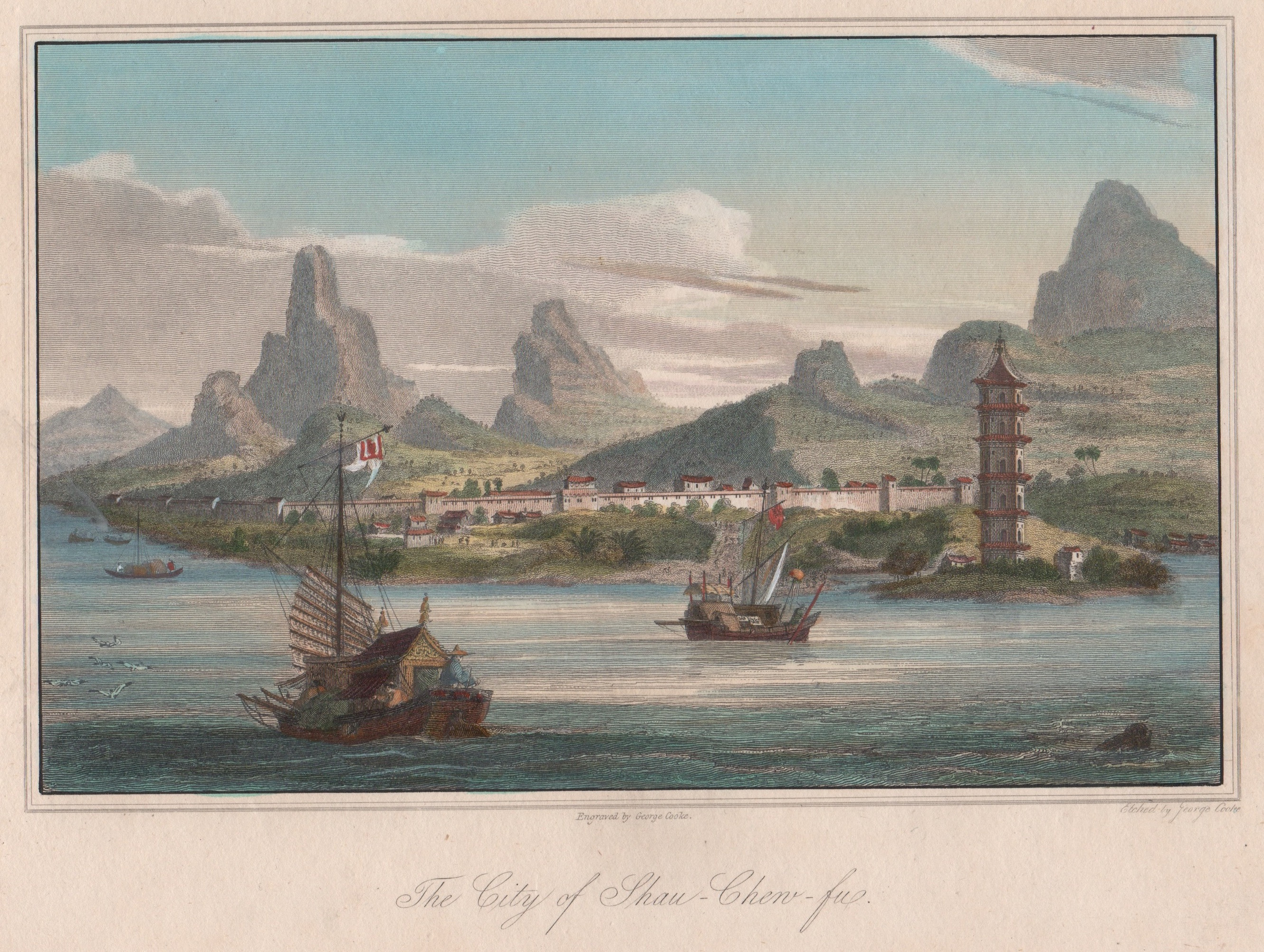
The late Ming Tongtian Pagoda in front of 'Shau-chew-fu'—the prefectural city of Shaozhou—in a 19th-century colorized version of Nieuhof's depiction

Tongtian Pagoda was first built in 1546. (Note: The 25th year of the Jiajing Era of the Ming dynasty (明嘉靖二十五年).) The construction of the stone tower was ordered by the Shaozhou prefect Chen Dalun (t 陳大綸, s 陈大纶, Chén Dàlún) primarily to weigh down the area's sand and prevent further shifting or erosion caused by the confluence of waters from the Wu and Zhen Rivers.

It was rebuilt in 1603 (Note: The 31st year of the Wanli Era of the Ming (万历三十一年).) in brick and tile with a Buddhist shrine beneath, the Hall of the Midstream Pillar (中流砥柱堂, Zhōngliúdǐzhù Táng). Avoiding the area's periodic floods, the pagoda developed a legend that it raised itself with the rising waters and, seeming to float on the rapid water itself, became reckoned as one of the "24 Sights of Qujiang" (曲江二十四景). It was noted by the Dutch traveler Johan Nieuhof during the Dutch East India Company's embassy to China in the 1650s and his illustration of the pagoda was subsequently reprinted for centuries in various guides to China.

The Ming pagoda was destroyed in 1854 (Note: The 4th year of the Xianfeng Era of the Qing.) during the Taiping Rebellion against the Manchu-led Qing dynasty. Taiping soldiers started using it to observe the city's defenses and the Qing garrison bombarded it, leaving only the sandstone base and scattered debris.

The Shaoguan municipal government issued a proposal for reconstructing the pagoda in 2010 and budgeted 29.2 million yuan renminbi in July 2011 for the design submitted by Professor Cheng Jianjun (t 程建軍, s 程建军, Chéng Jiànjūn) from the South China University of Technology. The reconstructed pagoda was opened to the public on 29 September 2012.

== Design ==
The modern pagoda has a blue brick façade and reaches a height of around 130 feet (39 m). It follows an octagonal 9-story design typical of the Song dynasty with a modern core and central spiral staircase. Each floor has a wooden balustrade and most have copper windchime bells suspended from the eaves. The summit is topped with a glazed tile finial.

The ruined foundation of the early modern pagoda is preserved nearby, displayed under tempered glass.
