= Yuebei Tuhua =

Unclassified Chinese language

- Shaozhou Tuhua
- Native to: China
- Region: Shaoguan, Guangdong
- Ethnicity: Han, Yao
- Native speakers: (undated figure of 1 million)
- Language family: Sino-Tibetan: Sinitic; Chinese; Pinghua?; Yuebei Tuhua
- Writing system: Chinese, Latin, Nüshu

Language codes
- ISO 639-3: None (mis)
- ISO 639-6: sazo
- Glottolog: quji1234
- Linguasphere: 79-AAA-ph

Yuebei Tuhua
- Traditional Chinese: 粵北土話
- Simplified Chinese: 粤北土话
- Literal meaning: Northern Guangdong Dirt/Local/Rural Speech
Transcriptions
Standard Mandarin
- Hanyu Pinyin: Yuèběi Tǔhuà
- Wade–Giles: Yüeh-pei T'u-hua

Yuebei Tuhua
- Traditional Chinese: 韶州土話
- Simplified Chinese: 韶州土话
- Literal meaning: Mount Shaoshi District Dirt/Local/Rural Speech
Transcriptions
Standard Mandarin
- Hanyu Pinyin: Sháozhōu Tǔhuà
- Wade–Giles: Shao-chou T'u-hua

Yuebei Tuhua, also known as Shaozhou Tuhua or Northern Guangdong speech, is a variety of Chinese spoken around Shaoguan in northern Guangdong Province in southeastern China. (Shaoguan and the surrounding prefecture were formerly known as "Shaozhou" under imperial rule and Yue is a common Chinese abbreviation or synonym for Guangdong.) Mutually unintelligible with Mandarin, Cantonese, and Xiang, its origin and classification remain a matter of scholarly debate.

== Classification ==
Some scholars consider it to be an extension of Ping Chinese in Guangxi. Others consider it to have a foundation in Song dynasty-era Middle Gan, mixed with Hakka, Cantonese, and Southwestern Mandarin.

Chen (2012) notes that the Shaoguan Tuhua of Shibei (石陂, in Zhenjiang District) shares many similarities with the Hakka of Qujiang District, due to intensive contact.

Sagart (2001) considers the Nanxiong dialect (classified in the Language Atlas of China as a Yuebei Tuhua dialect) to be most closely related to Hakka. In contrast, Egerod (1983) had proposed a relationship between Nanxiong and Min.

== Dialects ==
Yuebei Tuhua is also known as Shaozhou Tuhua and as Shīpóhuà (虱婆话, "Shipo speech"), Shīnǎhuà (虱乸话, "Shina speech"), or Shīpóshēng (虱婆声, "Shipo accent") in its own region. It is also known as Pingdi Yaohua (平地瑶话, "Lowland Yao speech"), locally Piongtuojo or Piongtoajeu; "Yao" here might be a cultural designation, as only half of the one million speakers are classified as ethnic Yao.

Li & Zhuang (2009) cover the following dialects of Shaoguan Tuhua.

1. Dacun (大村), Qujiang District
2. Xiangyang (向阳), Wujiang District
3. Shibei (石陂), Zhenjiang District
4. Zhoutian (周田), Renhua County
5. Shitang (石塘), Renhua County
6. Guitou (桂头), Ruyuan County

Zhang Shuangqing (2004) covers five dialects of Lianzhou Tuhua (连州土话).

1. Xingzi (星子) dialect: 120,000 speakers in Xingzi (星子), Qingjiang (清江), Shantang (山塘), Tanling (潭岭), Dalubian (大路边) towns, and parts of Mabu (麻步) and Yao'an (瑶安) towns
2. Bao'an (保安) dialect: 30,000 speakers in Bao'an Town (保安镇), and parts of Longping Town (龙坪镇)
3. Lianzhou (连州) dialect (locally called ᴀt24 pi55 sheng 声): 40,000 speakers in Lianzhou Town (连州镇) and Fucheng Town (附城镇)
4. Xi'an (西岸) dialect (locally called Mansheng 蛮声): 30,000 speakers in Xi'an Town (西岸镇)
5. Fengyang (丰阳) dialect (locally called Mansheng 蛮声): 50,000 speakers in Fengyang Town (丰阳镇), and parts of Zhugang (朱岗), Dongpo (东陂), and Yao'an (瑶安) towns

== Distribution ==
Tuhua is retreating before Mandarin, Cantonese and Hakka and is found in rural dialect islands in the northern Guangdong counties of Lechang, Renhua, Ruyuan Yao Autonomous County, Qujiang, Nanxiong, Zhenjiang, Wujiang (parts of Shaoguan prefecture-level city), and Lianzhou and Liannan Yao Autonomous County in Qingyuan prefecture-level city.

== See also ==
- Lingling language
- Maojia language
