= Jianghua Tuhua =

Sinitic language of Hunan, China

- 江华土话
- Region: southern Hunan
- Language family: Sino-Tibetan: Sinitic; Chinese; Pinghua?; Xiangnan Tuhua; Jianghua Tuhua

Language codes
- ISO 639-3: None (mis)
- Glottolog: None
- Linguasphere: 79-AAA-pg

Jianghua Tuhua (江华土话) is a branch of Xiangnan Tuhua spoken by the Yao people in Jianghua Yao Autonomous County, Hunan. It is spoken in Taoxu Town (涛圩镇) and Helukou Town (河路口镇) in Jianghua County, Hunan.

== Vocabulary ==
The following word list of Jianghua Tuhua is from Li (2011:325–326).

Chinese gloss	English gloss	Jianghua Tuhua	Page
猪	pig	li⁵³	325
拦	to block	li²²	325
干	dry	lie²⁴	325
懒	lazy	li³²	325
弯	crooked, bent	li⁴⁴	325
绿	green	li³⁵	325
子	child	li³³	325
桃子	peach	laə²²li³³	325
绳子	rope	saə²²li³³	325
第三人称	3rd person personal pronoun	ka²²	325
第三人称	3rd person personal pronoun	ku⁴⁴	325
第三人称	3rd person personal pronoun	laə³³	325
聋子	deaf person	loŋ²²li³³ka⁴⁴	325
缺鼻	person with no nose	kʰua⁴⁴pei²⁴laə²²	325
第一	first	tai⁴⁴ji⁴⁴	325
第二	second	tai⁴⁴nai³⁵	325
父亲	father	ta³⁵ta³⁵	326
哥哥	elder brother	kə⁵³kə⁵³	326
妹妹	younger sister	mai²²mai³⁵	326
姐姐	elder sister	tsai³²tsai²⁴	326
五头牛	five cows	ŋoa²²lau²²ŋau²²	326
一个碗	one bowl	ji⁴⁴tʂo⁴⁴aŋ²⁴	326
一双筷	one pair of chopsticks	ji⁴⁴saŋ⁵³ti²⁴	326
一群牛	one herd of cattle	a²⁴tʂaə²²ŋau²²	326
红布	red cloth	ʂo⁴⁴poa³³	326
热水	hot water	nai³⁵su²⁴	326
公牛	bull (male)	ŋau²²koa⁵³	326
母牛	cow (female)	ŋau²²m̩⁵³	326
