= Dong dialect =

Sinitic language spoken by the Yao people of China

Dong
- 峒话
- Region: southern Hunan
- Ethnicity: Yao
- Language family: Sino-Tibetan: Sinitic; Chinese; Pinghua?; Xiangnan Tuhua; Dong

Language codes
- ISO 639-3: –
- Glottolog: dong1299
- Linguasphere: 79-AAA-pc

Dong dialect (Chinese: 峒话) is a branch of Xiangnan Tuhua, spoken by the Yao people in Xinning County, Hunan province, China. Dong dialect is currently endangered, and is spoken in the villages of Huangyandong 黄岩峒, Malindong 麻林峒, and Dazhendong 大圳峒 in Huangjin Ethnic Yao Township 黄金瑶族乡, Xinning County. It is also spoken in Malin Ethnic Yao Township 麻林瑶族乡, located just to the east of Huangjin Township.

It is documented in detail as Malinhua 麻林话 by Hu (2018).

== Vocabulary ==
The following word list of Dong dialect is from Li (2011:332–334).

Standard Chinese gloss	English gloss	Dong gloss
硬	hard, stiff	ŋai¹¹
牛	cattle	ŋau¹³
你	you (singular)	ŋ̍³³
一	one	i⁵⁵
二	two	liə¹¹
三	three	sa³⁵
四	four	ɕi⁵⁵
五	five	ɤŋ³³
六	six	lei³³
七	seven	tɕʰi⁵⁵
八	eight	pia³³
九	nine	tɕy³³
十	ten	dzi¹¹
百	hundred	pa³³
千	thousand	tsʰai³⁵
万	million	uai¹¹
亿	hundred million	i³⁵
斤	jin (Chinese measurement)	tɕin³⁵
两	double	lio³³
个	classifier (general)	kəu³³
只	classifier (animals, pieces)	tɕa³³
蔸	root and stem of certain plants	tau³⁵
条	classifier (thin, long objects)	dy¹³
根	root	ɣai¹³
丈	husband	dio³³
尺	chi (Chinese measurement)	tsʰa³³
里	li (Chinese measurement)	li³³
天	sky	tʰiə³⁵
地	ground	ti¹¹
人	person, human being	ɤŋ¹³
云	cloud	ɣoŋ³³
雨	rain	u³³
霜	frost	ɕio³⁵
东	east	toŋ³⁵
南	south	la³³
西	west	ɕi³⁵
北	north	pai³³
春	spring	tɕʰoŋ³⁵
夏	summer	xa¹¹
秋	autumn	tsʰei³⁵
冬	winter	toŋ³⁵
鸡	chicken	tɕi³⁵
狗	dog	kau³³
跳	to jump	tʰei³³
打	to hit	dei³³
抬	to lift	diəa³³
爬	to climb	la³³
快	fast	kʰəa³³
慢	slow	mai¹¹
好	good	xəu³³
坏	bad	ya¹¹
黑	black	xai³³
白	white	ba¹¹
起床	to get up from bed	di³³tɕʰi¹¹
洗脸	to wash face	ɕiə³³miə¹³
梳头	to comb hair	ɕy³⁵dau³³
炒菜	to stir-fry vegetables	tsʰəu³³tɕʰəa⁵⁵³
吃亮堂饭（早饭）	to eat breakfast	y¹¹do¹³lo³⁵pai¹¹
喂猪	to feed pig	ui⁵⁵tei³⁵
看牛	to tend cattle	lei⁵⁵ŋao³³
弄柴	to prepare firewood	ləu³⁵dʑəa³³
烧火	to burn fire	ɕy³⁵fəu³³
吃半日饭（中午饭）	to eat lunch	y¹¹po⁵⁵ɣoŋ³³pai¹¹
挑水	to carry water	ta³⁵ɕui³³
洗衣	to wash clothes	ɕiə³³i³⁵
缝衣	to sew clothes	lai³³i³⁵
洗澡	to take a bath	ba¹³duo¹³
吃夜头饭	to eat dinner	yi¹¹ia¹¹dau³³pai¹¹
穿衣	to wear clothes	təu³³i³⁵
穿裤	to wear pants	bəu¹³fu⁵⁵
穿鞋	to wear shoes	da¹¹iəa¹³
戴帽子	to wear hat	tia⁵⁵mo³³tə¹⁰
睡觉	to sleep	miə³³ŋo¹³tɕo¹⁰
自己	self (reflexive)	tɕiə¹¹ka³⁵
我们	we (exclusive)	a³³li³⁵
他们	they	tʰaŋ³⁵li¹⁰
大家	everyone	tɕin¹¹ɕi⁵⁵
老女（妻子）	old woman (wife)	ləu³³ny³⁵
主家人（丈夫）	head of household (husband)	tɕəu³³ka³⁵ɤŋ¹³
