= Zhenjiang, Shaoguan =

Zhenjiang 浈江区
- District
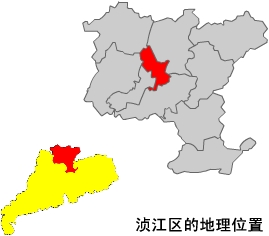
- Location of Zhenjiang in Shaoguan

- Location in Guangdong
- Coordinates: 24°48′05″N 113°36′05″E
- Country: People's Republic of China
- Province: Guangdong
- Prefecture-level city: Shaoguan

Area
  - Total: 523 km^{2} (202 sq mi)

Population (2020)
  - Total: 364,319
  - Density: 697/km^{2} (1,800/sq mi)
- Time zone: UTC+8 (China Standard)

Zhenjiang District (simplified Chinese: 浈江区; traditional Chinese: 湞江區; pinyin: Zhēnjiāng Qū) is a district of Shaoguan, a city in northern Guangdong Province (Yuebei), China. Zhenjiang is seat of Shaoguan. As of 2021, there are 10 county-level administrative divisions including 3 subdistrict, 5 towns and 2 agents of Quren mineral bureau (曲仁矿务局办事处) under Zhenjiang's jurisdiction. Specific information in below:

== Subdistricts ==
Zhenjiang District's 3 subdistricts are as follows:

- Donghe Subdistrict (东河街道)
- Chezhan Subdistrict (车站街道)
- Fengcai Subdistrict (风采街道)

== Towns ==
Zhenjiang District's five towns are as follows:

- Xinshao Town (新韶镇)
- Leyuan Town (乐园镇, or "Paradise Town" in literally)
- Shiliting Town (十里亭镇)
- Lishi Town (犁市镇, or "Plow city Town" in literally)
- Huaping Town (花坪镇)

== Agent of Quren mineral bureau ==
The two agent of Quren mineral bureau are agent of Quren mineral bureau at Quren (曲仁矿务局曲仁办事处) and agent of Quren mineral bureau at Tianluochong (曲仁矿务局田螺冲办事处) respectively.
