= Maba Man =

Hominin fossil

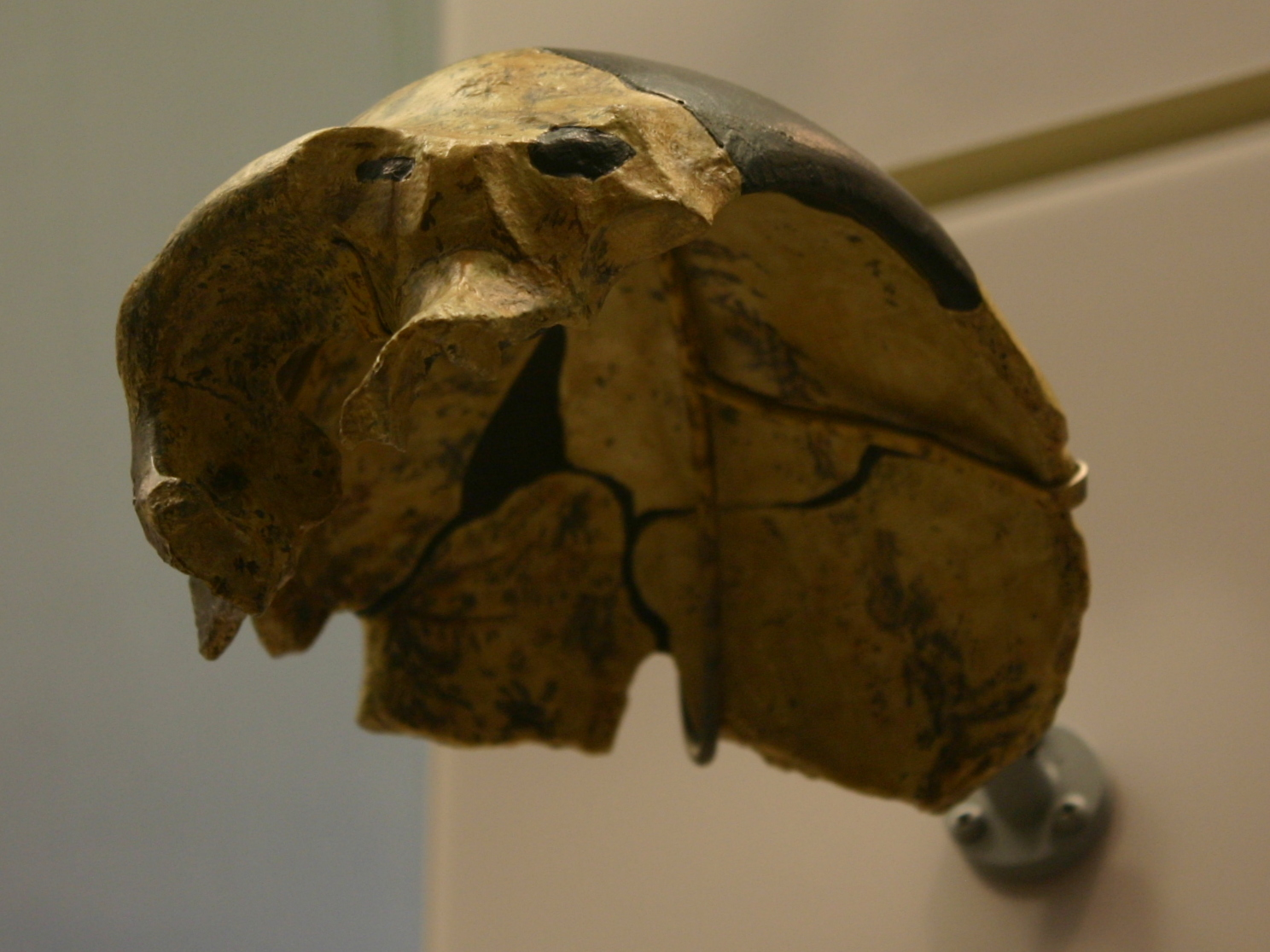
- Replica of Maba Man's Cranium
- Common name: Maba Man
- Species: Homo, species uncertain
- Age: 215,000 years
- Place discovered: Guangdong, China
- Date discovered: 1958

Maba Man (simplified Chinese: 马坝人; traditional Chinese: 馬壩人; pinyin: mǎbà-rén) is a pre-modern hominin whose remains were discovered in 1958 in caves near the town called Maba, near Shaoguan city in the northern part of Guangdong province, China.

== Characteristics ==
Farmers found the Maba cranium in 1958 near a Chinese village named Maba. Maba Man was labeled an intermediate in form between Homo erectus and H. sapiens; the remains are referred by many authorities to archaic H. sapiens or to an Asian extension of H. heidelbergensis. As the scientists did more research on the Maba cranium, they found that the fossils consisted of a skull cap and parts of the right upper face, with parts of the nose also still attached. The scientists saw a connection with Homo erectus because the brow ridges were pronounced, forming an arch over each eye, and the bones of the brain-case were low and thick. Even so, the brain was apparently larger than that of H. erectus, though precise measurement of cranial capacity is not possible, as the skull's base is incomplete.

Showing not only characteristics of H. erectus, archaic H. sapiens and H. heidelbergensis, Maba 1 (museum number PA 84) also exhibits traits representing modern humans and Neanderthals. If the reconstruction of the skull is accurate, the upper face morphology of the Maba 1 is similar to Neanderthals with a prominent nose and thick parietal bone at the bregma. The vertical frontal squama and thin vault is similar to modern humans. Although we don't have a precise measurement of cranial capacity, 1300 cc is the estimated cranial capacity assigned to Maba 1. This is in a range similar to modern humans and Neanderthals' cranial capacities.

The almost completely fused main cranial sutures, less pronounced muscular crests, and the rough external surface of the skull indicate the possibility of Maba 1 being a middle-aged male.

Postero-lateral to the right frontal tubercle, Maba 1's extracranial surface exhibits a 14 mm long crescent scar. On the intracranial surface roughly at the same position, a hump about the same size exists.

One feature that is worth mentioning is the inferior lateral orbital margin of Maba 1. While most of the other Pleistocene Chinese hominid specimens have a rounded margin, Maba 1 has a sharp one.

Dating of the Maba 1 human fossil is problematic. It could possibly go back to the Middle Pleistocene, the Middle-Late Pleistocene transition, and Late Pleistocene, roughly between 300 and 130 ka. The uncertainty of the dating is due to the fact that the original stratigraphic section is in a deep and narrow crevice the age of which can't be established with certainty. Current chronological data comes from a South Branch Cave 30 meters away from where the cranium was found using mass-spectrometric U-series, and a vertebrate tooth using uranium methods. A refined analysis narrowed down the age to 135–129 ka, but a better revision in 2014 gave 237 ka.

== Technology ==
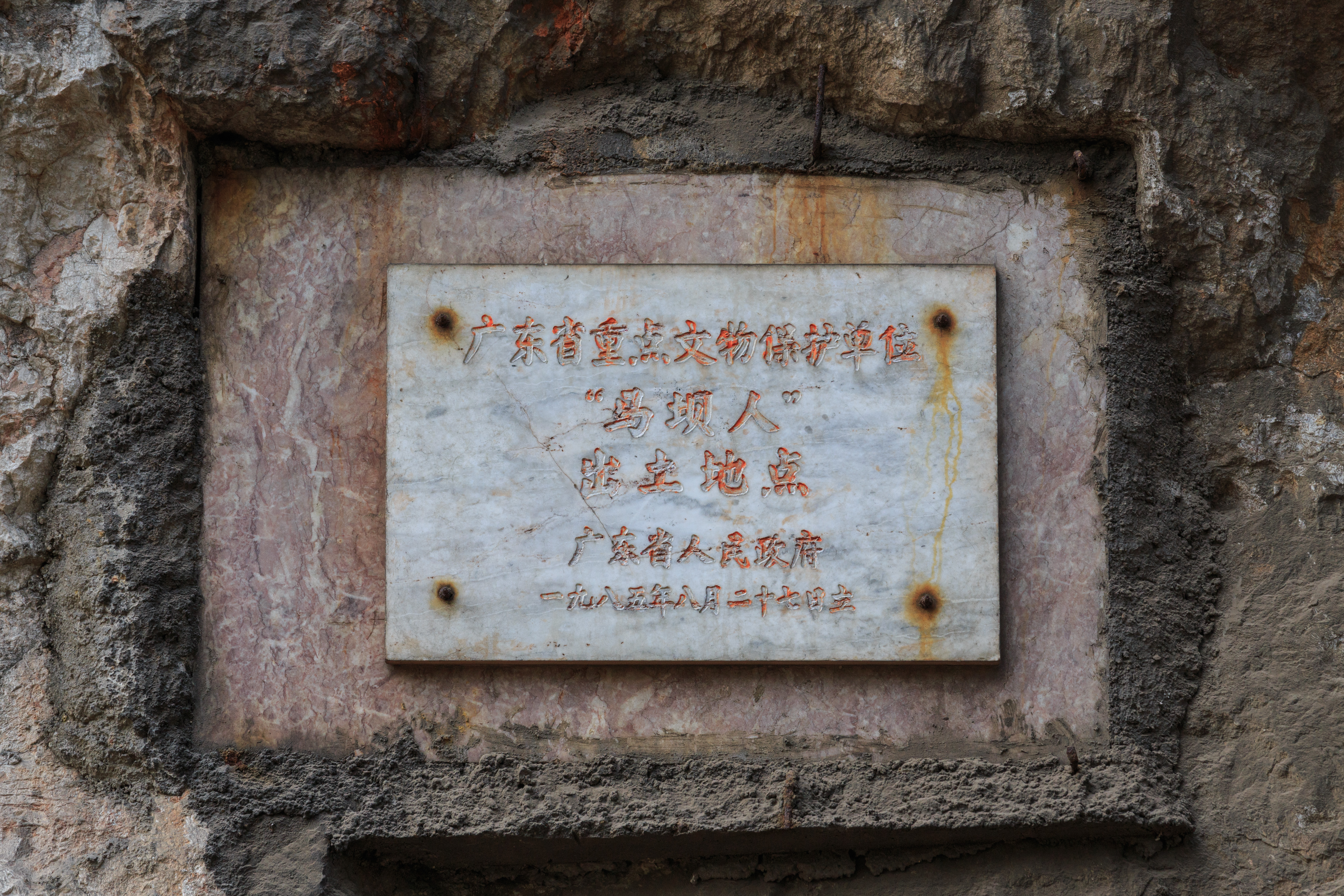
Shiziyan

In 1984, the research team re-entered the cave where the Maba Man had been found and cleared through the pile of animal fossils at the entry. These had been moved there in 1958, contemporary with the discovery of Maba Man. Two stone tools (KP84001 and KP84002) were revealed.

The Lion Cave (Shiziyan) has four roughly defined strata. KP84001 and KP84002 were found in the second stratum. They were made of gravel. The bulb of percussions of both stone tools are mostly blurry. The hypothesis is that the gravel used for the stone tools came from the nearby river bank and bench where the lithology belongs to quartzite. KP84001 is a chopper with a remaining part about 15.82 cm long, 8.64 cm wide. The sharp edge of it is 2.31 cm. KP84002 has a diameter of 9.41 cm, and is 4.73 cm thick.

== Associated fauna ==
A total of 8 orders of animal fossils were found in the Lion Cave. The list includes Macaca sp., Rhinopithecus tingianus, Pongo sp., Rattus rattus, Hystrix sp., Hystrix subcristata, Cuon javanicus, Ailuropoda melanoleuca fovealis, Ursus thibetanus, Arctonyx collaris, Paguma larvata, Viberra zibetha expectata, Crocuta ultima, Felis sp., Panthera tigris, Stegodon orientalis, Palaeoloxodon namadicus, Megatapirus augustus, Rhinoceros sinensis, Tapirus sp., Sus scrofa, Sus sp., Muntiacus muntjak, Cervus unicolor, Hydropotes sp., Bubalus sp., Testudo tungia, Parasilurus asotus, Pelteobagrus fulvidraco, Unio sp., Corbicula sp., along with Caprinae indent, Trionychidae indet, Cyprinidae indet, Gastropoda, a small number of bird keel bones and snake spine bones.
