= Northern Guangdong =

Coordinates: 24.691943°N 112.846069°E

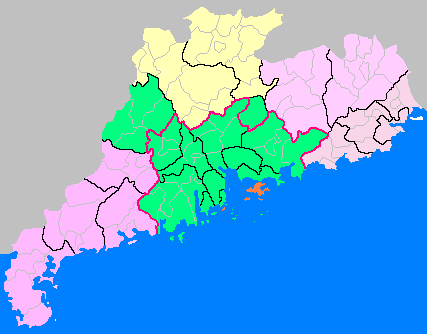
- Country: People's Republic of China
- Province: Guangdong

Northern Guangdong, commonly referred to as Yuebei (simplified Chinese: 粤北; traditional Chinese: 粵北; pinyin: Yuèběi), is a region of northern Guangdong province. It is a region encompassing mountainous and hilly terrain, and includes the region of Guangdong north of the Tropic of Cancer.

Yuebei is a multiethnic region, with a large population speaking Yuebei native languages (粵北土話／Yuebei Tuhua), Cantonese, Hakka, among others. While it has a history of engaging with variously government-led poverty alleviation projects since the 1980s, the region is increasingly becoming a location for the development of industrial parks, tourism, and organic food production.

== See also ==
- Yuebei Tuhua

Other regions of Guangdong

- Pearl River Delta
- Yuedong, region of eastern Guangdong including Jieyang, Chaozhou, Shanwei and Shantou
- Yuexi, region of western Guangdong including Maoming, Zhanjiang and Yangjiang
