= Wujiang, Shaoguan =

Wujiang 武江区
- District
- Location in Guangdong
- Coordinates: 24°48′03″N 113°34′37″E
- Country: People's Republic of China
- Province: Guangdong
- Prefecture-level city: Shaoguan

Area
  - Total: 682 km^{2} (263 sq mi)

Population (2020)
  - Total: 373,686
  - Density: 548/km^{2} (1,420/sq mi)
- Time zone: UTC+8 (China Standard)

Wujiang (Chinese: 武江; pinyin: Wǔjiāng) is a district of Shaoguan, Guangdong province, China.
