= Xiangnan Tuhua =

Chinese variety of southeastern Hunan

- Tuhua
- Pronunciation: [tifɯə]
- Native to: China
- Region: southern Hunan
- Ethnicity: Han Chinese, Plains Yao
- Language family: Sino-Tibetan: Sinitic; Chinese; Pinghua?; Xiangnan Tuhua
- Writing system: Chinese characters, Nüshu (until 2004)

Language codes
- ISO 639-3: None (mis)
- Linguasphere: 79-AAA-pe; 79-AAA-pf; 79-AAA-pg; 79-AAA-pc
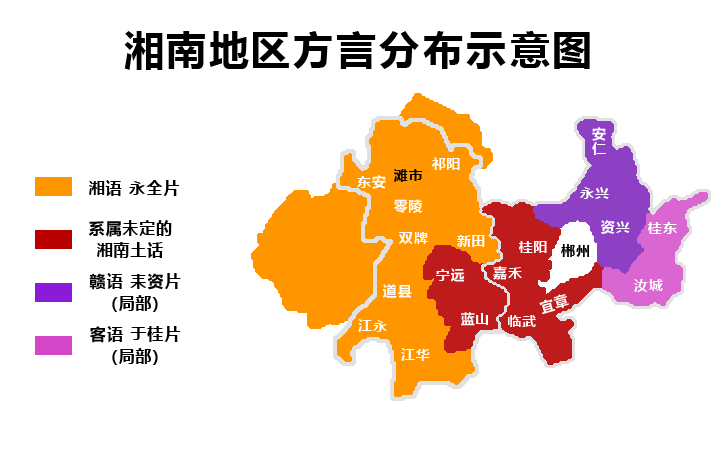

Xiangnan Tuhua (simplified Chinese: 湘南土话; traditional Chinese: 湘南土話; pinyin: Xiāngnán Tǔhuà; lit. 'local languages of southern Hunan'), or simply Tuhua, is a group of unclassified Chinese varieties of southeastern Hunan. It is spoken throughout some areas of Yongzhou prefecture (apart from Qiyang County in the northeast) and in the western half of Chenzhou prefecture, in which Xiangnan dialects of Southwestern Mandarin are also spoken. Xiangnan Tuhua is spoken by the Sinicized Pingdi ('plains') Yao.

Xiangnan Tuhua, which differs enough from those of other parts of Hunan that there is little mutual intelligibility, is known to its speakers as [tifɯə] 'Dong language'. There are differing opinions on the classification of Xiangnan Tuhua, as it has features of several different Chinese varieties. Some scholars classify it under Xiang Chinese or Pinghua, and other scholars consider it a hybrid dialect. Most Jiangyong residents are bilingual in Xiangnan Tuhua and the Hunan dialect of Southwestern Mandarin. Xiangnan Tuhua was only written using Nüshu, and Nüshu was not used to write other languages, such as the Southwestern Mandarin spoken in Hunan, or the local Yao language.

== Phonology ==
=== Vowels ===
Xiangnan Tuhua vowels
		Front	Central	Back
Close	rounded	i		ɯ
Close	unrounded	y		u
Open-mid		ɛ	ə	ɔ
Open			a	

There are 6 diphthongs, and 7 tones, the diphthongs are: /ai/, /au/, /ɔu/, /ɛi/, /əɯ/ and /ɯə/. Diphthongs cannot be followed by /ŋ/. The tones are /55/ (˥), /44/ (˦), /42/ (˦˨), /35/ (˧˥), /33/ (˧), /21/ (˨˩), and /13/ (˩˧).

=== Consonants ===
Xiangnan Tuhua consonants
		Labial	Labiodental	Dental	Palato-alveolar	Palatal	Velar
Plosive	unaspirated	p		t			k
Plosive	aspirated	pʰ		tʰ			kʰ
Affricate	unaspirated			t͡s	t͡ɕ		
Affricate	aspirated			t͡sʰ	t͡ɕʰ		
Fricative	unvoiced		f	s	ɕ		x
Fricative	voiced		v				
Nasal		m		n	ȵ		ŋ
Lateral				l			
Approximant		w, ɥ				j	

The phoneme /ŋ/ is deleted word-finally in some villages.

== See also ==
- Jianghua Tuhua
- Dong dialect
