= Pinghua Chinese =

Branch of Chinese spoken in Guangxi

Ping
- 平話 / 平话
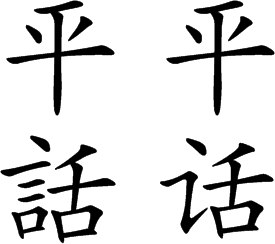
- Pinghua written in Chinese characters
- Native to: China, Vietnam
- Ethnicity: Han Chinese, Zhuang, Yao, San Chay
- Native speakers: 7+ million (2016)
- Language family: Sino-Tibetan: Sinitic; Chinese; Ping
- Varieties: Northern Pinghua; Southern Pinghua; Xiangnan Tuhua?; Yuebei Tuhua?

Language codes
- ISO 639-3: Either: cnp – Northern Pinghua csp – Southern Pinghua
- Glottolog: ping1245
- Linguasphere: 79-AAA-o
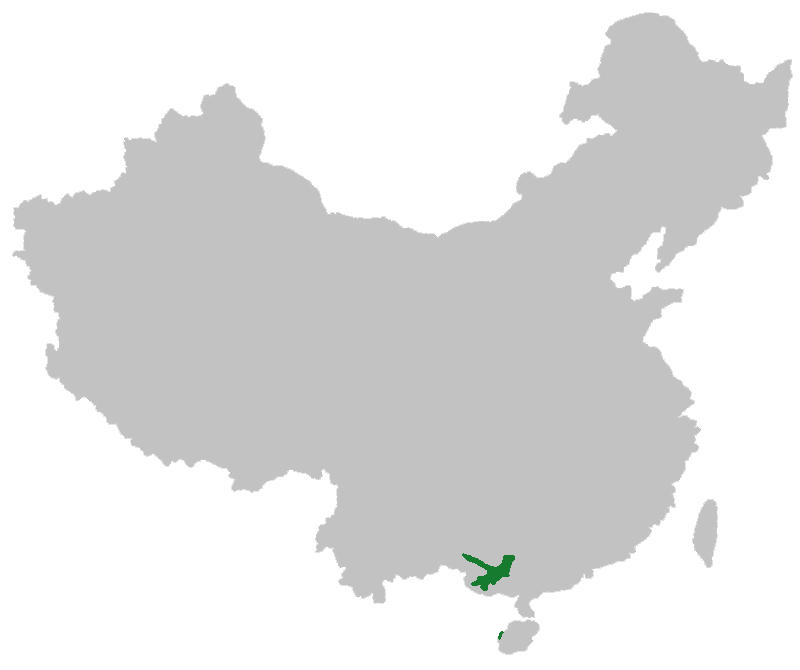

Pinghua
- Traditional Chinese: 平話
- Simplified Chinese: 平话
- Cantonese Yale: Pìhng Wá
- Hanyu Pinyin: Pínghuà
Transcriptions
Standard Mandarin
- Hanyu Pinyin: Pínghuà
Yue: Cantonese
- Yale Romanization: Pìhng Wá

Pinghua or Ping is one of the primary varieties of the Chinese language, spoken natively in parts of Guangxi, with some speakers in Southern Hunan and Northern Guangdong. Pinghua is also a lingua franca in some areas of Guangxi, spoken as a second language by speakers of Zhuang languages. Some speakers are officially classified as Zhuang, and many are genetically distinct from most other Han Chinese. The northern subgroup is centered on Guilin and the southern subgroup around Nanning. The Southern dialect has several notable features such as having four distinct checked tones, and using various loanwords from the Zhuang languages, such as the final particle wei for imperative sentences.

== History ==
Historically, Pinghua is associated with the earliest Han Chinese migrants who entered Guangxi via Hunan in the 1st millennium AD. The name is said to derive from the Pingnan Army (平南軍, "Pacify the South Army"), a Northern Song-era army led by Di Qing in the 11th century, of which the descendants settled in the modern time Pinghua speaking area.

== Classification ==
Language surveys in Guangxi during the 1950s recorded varieties of Chinese that had been included in the Yue dialect group but were different from those in Guangdong. Pinghua was designated as a separate dialect group from Yue by the Chinese Academy of Social Sciences in the 1980s and since then has been treated as a separate dialect in textbooks and surveys.

Since designation as a separate dialect group, Pinghua has been the focus of increased research. In 2008 a report by the Chinese Academy of Social Sciences of research into Chinese varieties noted an increase in research papers and surveys of Pinghua, from 7 before the 1987 publication of the Language Atlas of China based on the revised classification, and about 156 between then and 2004.

In the 1980s the number of speakers was listed as over 2 million; and by 2016 as 7 million.

== Dialects ==
Pinghua is generally divided into two mutually unintelligible languages:

- Northern Pinghua (Guìběi 桂北平话) is spoken in northern Guangxi, around the city of Guilin, in close proximity with Southwest Mandarin dialects.
  - and also in some places in Hunan, such as Tongdao Pinghua.
  - Younian dialect (ethnically Yao)
- Southern Pinghua (Guìnán 桂南平话) is spoken in southern Guangxi, around the city of Nanning. These varieties form a dialect continuum with Yue varieties spoken in that part of Guangxi (excluding enclaves of Cantonese, such as in Nanning). Yu Jin subdivides this group into three types:
  - Yongjiang, spoken along the Yong River around Nanning.
  - Guandao (官道; 'official road'), spoken to the east of Nanning in Laibin and the counties of Heng and Binyang, around the road to the Southwest Mandarin-speaking city of Liuzhou.
  - Rongjiang, spoken along the Rong River to the north of Liuzhou.
- Xiangnan Tuhua (Xiāngnán 湘南土话) is potentially a branch of Pinghua, spoken in southern Hunan.
  - Jianghua Tuhua
  - Dong
- Yuebei Tuhua (Yuèběi 粤北土话) is potentially a branch of Pinghua, spoken in northern Guangdong.
  - Fucheng dialect

The Zheyuan people of Funing County, Yunnan speak a form of Pinghua. They are located in Dongbo and Guichao, and they migrated from Nanning.

== Phonology ==
Nanning Pinghua has a voiceless lateral fricative [ɬ] for Middle Chinese /s/ or /z/, for example in the numbers /ɬam/ "three" and /ɬi/ "four". This is unlike Standard Cantonese but like some other Yue varieties such as Taishanese.

=== Tones ===
Southern Pinghua has six contrasting tones in open syllables, and four in checked syllables, as found in neighbouring Yue varieties such as the Bobai dialect.

Tones of Nanning Pinghua
Tone name		Level píng 平	Rising shàng 上	Departing qù 去	Entering rù 入
Upper yīn 陰	高	52 [˥˨]	33 [˧]	55 [˥]	5 [˥]
Upper yīn 陰	低	52 [˥˨]	33 [˧]	55 [˥]	3 [˧]
Lower yáng 陽	高	21 [˨˩]	24 [˨˦]	22 [˨]	23 [˨˧]
Lower yáng 陽	低	21 [˨˩]	24 [˨˦]	22 [˨]	2 [˨]

The split of the lower entering tone is determined by the initial consonant, with the low rising contour occurring after sonorant initials.

== Potential incorporation of Xiangnan Tuhua and Yuebei Tuhua ==
Chinese linguist Professor Wang Futang from Peking University Chinese Department concluded "The various patterns of aspiration in stops and fricatives resulting from the devoicing of Middle Chinese fully voiced initials in Pinghua, Xiangnan Tuhua and Yuebei Tuhua indicate that Guangxi is the core area of distribution of Old Pinghua, while the Xiangnan Tuhua and Yuebei Tuhua regions are areas to which Old Pinghua later expanded." He also concluded that Pinghua in Guangxi, Xiangnan Tuhua and Yuebei Tuhua should be classified as the same dialect. Throughout his work, he consistently treated Xiangnan Tuhua and Yuebei Tuhua as integral parts of Pinghua. He commented "Historically, there is no doubt that Pinghua underwent an independent development distinct from that of other dialects, and that it exerted a significant influence on the surrounding languages and dialects. However, it has now become a less dominant dialect. Although it still retains its basic characteristics, its prospects for continued development are not optimistic. Pinghua in southern Guangxi may eventually merge into Yue, while Pinghua in northern Guangxi, as well as Xiangnan Tuhua and Yuebei Tuhua, may eventually disappear."

== Genetic profile ==
Genetically, Pinghua speakers have more in common with non-Han ethnic groups in southern China, as opposed to other Han groups.
