= Nanxiong =

Nanxiong 南雄市 Namyung
- County-level & Sub-prefectural city
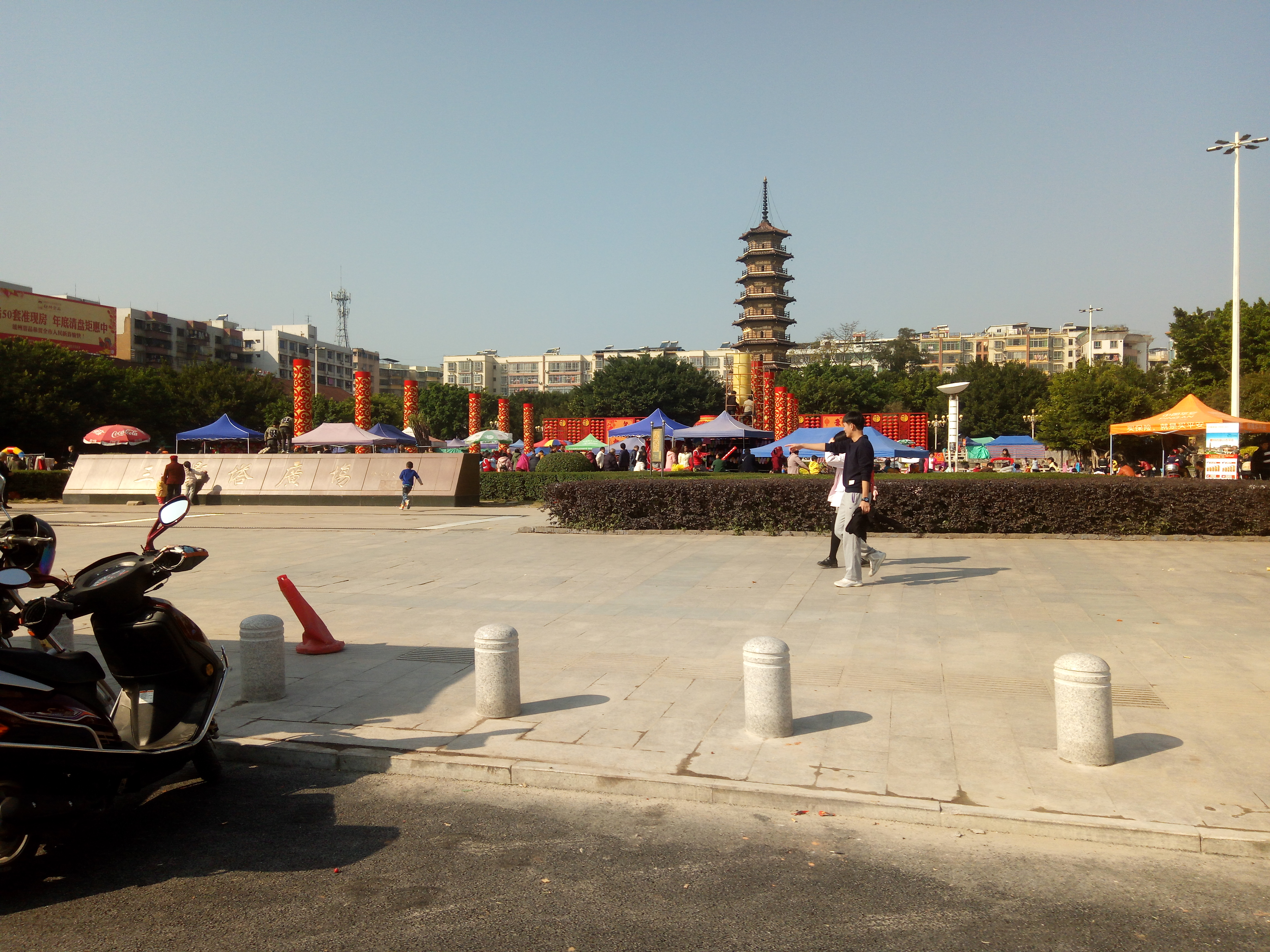

- Location in Guangdong
- Coordinates: 25°07′N 114°18′E
- Country: People's Republic of China
- Province: Guangdong
- Prefecture-level city: Shaoguan

Area
  - Total: 2,361.4 km^{2} (911.7 sq mi)

Population (2020)
  - Total: 353,916
  - Density: 149.88/km^{2} (388.18/sq mi)
- Time zone: UTC+8 (China Standard)
- Website: http://www.gdnx.gov.cn/

Nanxiong (Chinese: 南雄; pinyin: Nánxióng), historically Namyung, Namhung, and Nanhsiung, is a county-level city of northern Guangdong province, People's Republic of China, bordering Jiangxi to the north, east and southeast. It is under the administration of the prefecture-level city of Shaoguan.

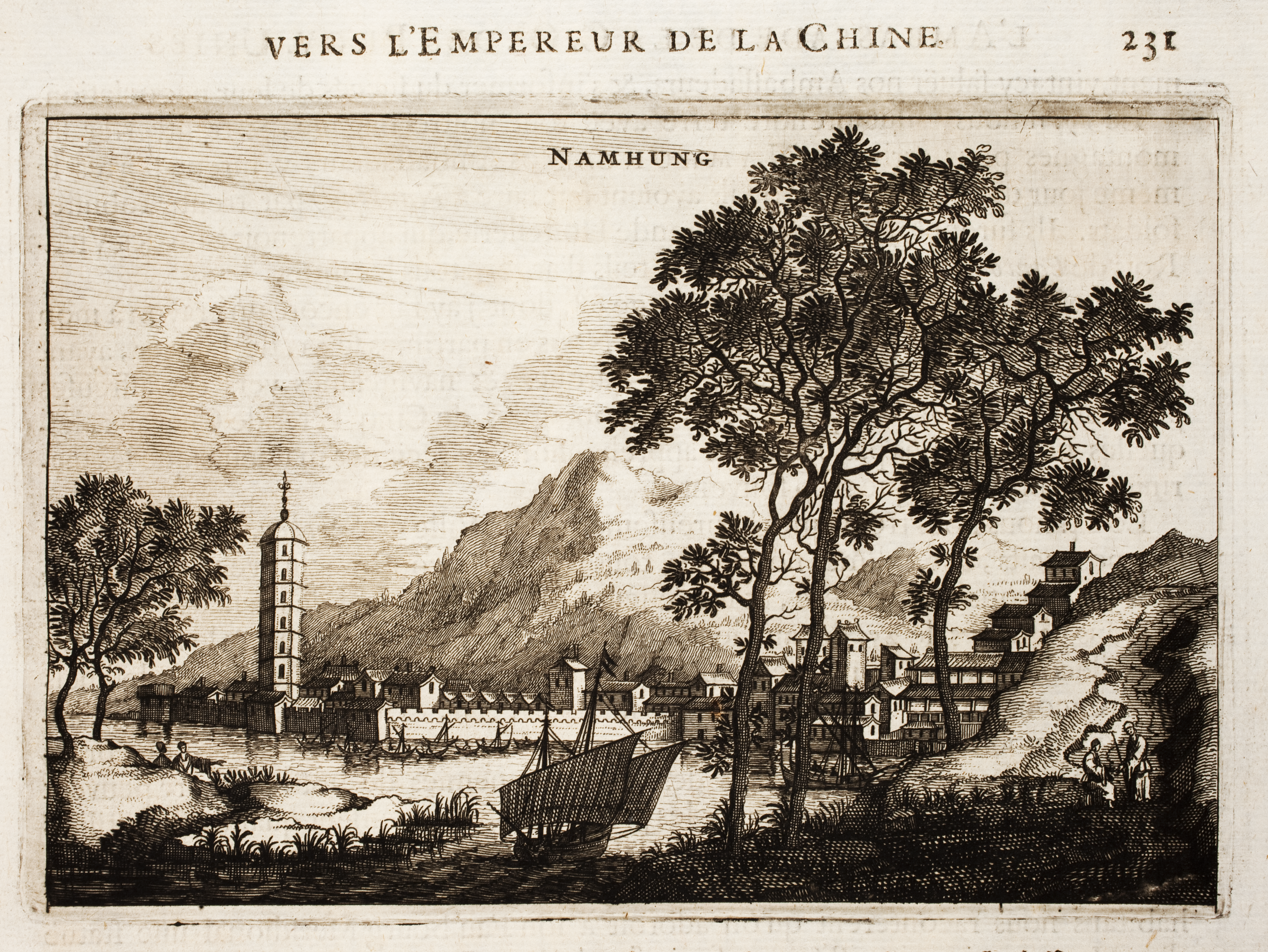
"Namhung" (Nanxiong). Nieuhof: L'ambassade de la Compagnie Orientale des Provinces Unies vers l'Empereur de la Chine, 1665

== Fossils ==
Fossils of Planocrania datangensis, the type genus and species of Planocraniidae, a family of terrestrial eusuchian crocodylomorphs. Colloquially known as the "Hoved Crocodiles" was found in the city in 1976.

== Climate ==
Climate data for Nanxiong, elevation 150 m (490 ft), (1991–2020 normals, extremes 1955–2010)
Month	Jan	Feb	Mar	Apr	May	Jun	Jul	Aug	Sep	Oct	Nov	Dec	Year
Record high °C (°F)	27.5 (81.5)	31.1 (88.0)	32.0 (89.6)	34.4 (93.9)	36.4 (97.5)	37.2 (99.0)	39.5 (103.1)	40.4 (104.7)	37.9 (100.2)	36.2 (97.2)	34.2 (93.6)	29.0 (84.2)	40.4 (104.7)
Mean daily maximum °C (°F)	14.1 (57.4)	16.7 (62.1)	19.4 (66.9)	25.2 (77.4)	29.1 (84.4)	31.8 (89.2)	34.2 (93.6)	33.8 (92.8)	31.1 (88.0)	27.2 (81.0)	22.1 (71.8)	16.4 (61.5)	25.1 (77.2)
Daily mean °C (°F)	9.7 (49.5)	12.1 (53.8)	15.2 (59.4)	20.6 (69.1)	24.5 (76.1)	27.1 (80.8)	28.8 (83.8)	28.3 (82.9)	26.0 (78.8)	21.9 (71.4)	16.7 (62.1)	11.3 (52.3)	20.2 (68.3)
Mean daily minimum °C (°F)	6.6 (43.9)	8.8 (47.8)	12.1 (53.8)	17.2 (63.0)	21.1 (70.0)	23.9 (75.0)	25.0 (77.0)	24.7 (76.5)	22.4 (72.3)	17.9 (64.2)	12.8 (55.0)	7.6 (45.7)	16.7 (62.0)
Record low °C (°F)	−6.2 (20.8)	−1.4 (29.5)	−1.0 (30.2)	5.3 (41.5)	11.3 (52.3)	16.0 (60.8)	19.7 (67.5)	20.7 (69.3)	14.8 (58.6)	6.3 (43.3)	1.5 (34.7)	−4.1 (24.6)	−6.2 (20.8)
Average precipitation mm (inches)	69.6 (2.74)	87.6 (3.45)	171.1 (6.74)	187.0 (7.36)	232.1 (9.14)	232.4 (9.15)	145.2 (5.72)	137.2 (5.40)	100.9 (3.97)	44.1 (1.74)	57.5 (2.26)	49.7 (1.96)	1,514.4 (59.63)
Average precipitation days (≥ 0.1 mm)	10.6	11.9	17.4	16.7	17.2	16.5	14.1	13.9	9.9	5.5	7.7	7.5	148.9
Average snowy days	0.5	0.5	0.1	0	0	0	0	0	0	0	0	0.3	1.4
Average relative humidity (%)	73	76	81	80	81	81	76	78	77	70	72	70	76
Mean monthly sunshine hours	87.2	77.7	67.3	90.9	122.2	141.6	212.1	200.1	167.5	166.9	137.3	128.0	1,598.8
Percentage possible sunshine	26	24	18	24	30	35	51	50	46	47	42	39	36
Source: China Meteorological AdministrationAll-time record low
