= Bei River =

Northern tributary of the Pearl River

Coordinates: 23°08′43″N 112°48′54″E

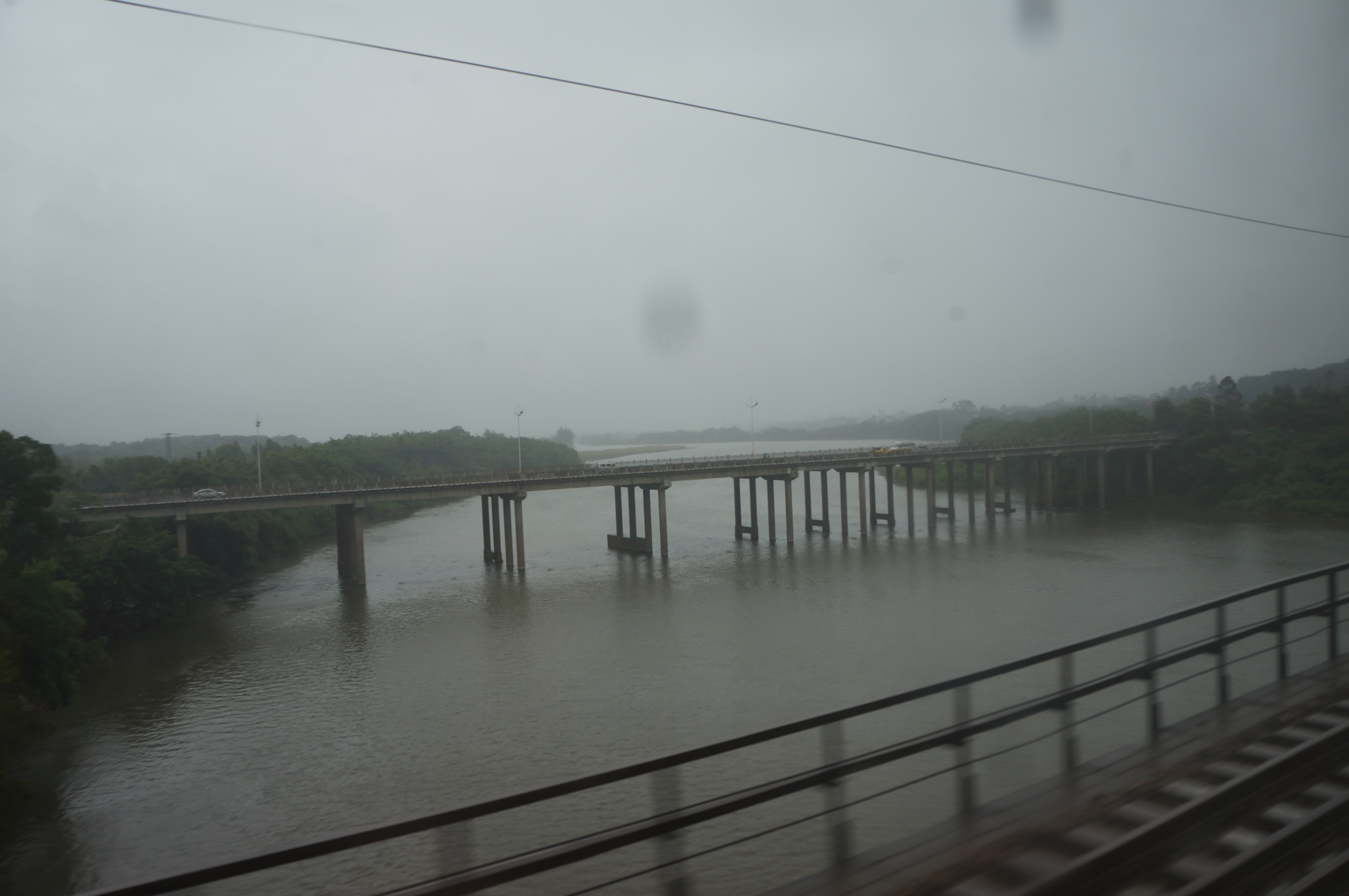

Physical characteristics
- Length: 633 km (393 mi)
- Discharge
  - average: 1,216 cubic metres per second (42,900 cu ft/s)

Basin features
- River system: Pearl
- Tributaries
  - left: Wengjiang
  - right: Wujiang, Lianjiang, Suijiang

Bei River
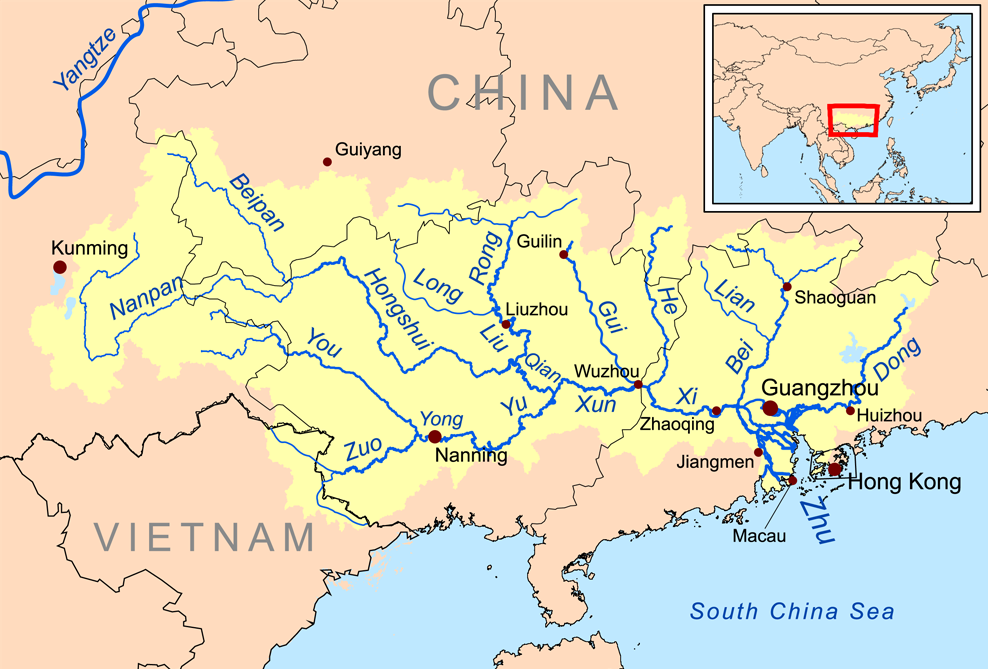
- Chinese: 北江
- Literal meaning: North River
Transcriptions
Standard Mandarin
- Hanyu Pinyin: Běi Jiāng
- Wade–Giles: Pei Chiang
Yue: Cantonese
- Jyutping: Bak^{1} Gong^{1}

The Bei or North River, also known by its Chinese name as the Beijiang or Bei Jiang, is the northern tributary of the Pearl River in southern China. The other two main tributaries of the Pearl River are the western Xi Jiang and the eastern Dong Jiang.

The Bei River is 633 km (393 mi) long, running through central Guangdong from the confluence of the Zhen and Wu Rivers at Shaoguan to the formation of the Pearl River near Guangzhou.

== See also ==
- Pearl River Delta
- Geography of China
- List of rivers of Asia
