= Qujiang, Shaoguan =

Qujiang 曲江区 Kukong
- District
- Location in Guangdong
- Coordinates: 24°41′21″N 113°34′44″E
- Country: People's Republic of China
- Province: Guangdong
- Prefecture-level city: Shaoguan

Area
  - Total: 1,651 km^{2} (637 sq mi)

Population (2020)
  - Total: 290,455
  - Density: 175.9/km^{2} (455.6/sq mi)
- Time zone: UTC+8 (China Standard)

Qujiang
- Chinese: 曲江
- Postal: Kukong
Transcriptions
Standard Mandarin
- Hanyu Pinyin: Qǔjiāng
- Wade–Giles: Ch'ü^{3}-chiang^{1}

Qujiang (postal: Kukong; Chinese: 曲江; pinyin: Qǔjiāng) is a district of Shaoguan, Guangdong province, China.
