= Fangyan =

Fangyan may refer to:

- Regional varieties of Chinese (Chinese: 方言; pinyin: fāngyán)
- Fangyan (book), Han dynasty dictionary by Yang Xiong
- Fangyan, Zhejiang, town in Yongkang, Zhejiang, China
- Fangyan Formation, geological formation in Zhejiang
