= List of National Scenic and Historic Areas of China =

In People's Republic of China, National Scenic and Historic Area (Chinese: 国家级风景名胜区; lit. 'country-level scenic attraction area'), officially National Park of China, is a type of protected area with significant cultural and/or natural value.

In 1994, the former Ministry of Construction of China published a green book 中国风景名胜区形势与展望 (China's Scenic and Historic Areas: Current Situation and Outlook) stating that China's "Scenic and Historic Area" corresponds to foreign National Park and that its English name shall be "National Park of China", which was later formalised in a National Standard published in 1999.

The current governmental regulation, Regulations on Scenic and Historic Areas (Chinese: 风景名胜区条例) was originally promulgated on September 19, 2006, pursuant to Decree No. 474 of the State Council of the People's Republic of China; it was first amended on February 6, 2016, pursuant to the Decision of the State Council on Amending Certain Administrative Regulations (Chinese: 国务院关于修改部分行政法规的决定), and was second amended on January 30, 2026, pursuant to the Decision of the State Council on Amending and Repealing Certain Administrative Regulations (Chinese: 国务院关于修改和废止部分行政法规的决定), taking effect on March 20, 2026.

As of 2018, there are 244 National Scenic and Historic Areas designated in 9 batches.

- Batch 1: 44 parks, published 8 Nov 1982.
- Batch 2: 40 parks, published 1 Aug 1988.
- Batch 3: 35 parks, published 10 Jan 1994.
- Batch 4: 32 parks, published 17 May 2002.
- Batch 5: 26 parks, published 13 Jan 2004.
- Batch 6: 10 parks, published 31 Dec 2005.
- Batch 7: 21 parks, published 28 Dec 2009.
- Batch 8: 17 parks, published 31 Oct 2012.
- Batch 9: 19 parks, published 21 Mar 2017.

== List ==
- Beijing
  - Badaling - Shisanling Scenic and Historic Area
  - Shihuadong Scenic and Historic Area
- Tianjin
  - Panshan Scenic and Historic Area
- Hebei
  - Chengde Bishushanzhuang Waibamiao Scenic and Historic Area
  - Qinhuangdao Beidaihe Scenic and Historic Area
  - Yesanpo Scenic and Historic Area
  - Cangyanshan Scenic and Historic Area
  - Zhangshiyan Scenic and Historic Area
  - Xibaipo - Tianguishan Scenic and Historic Area
  - Kongshan Baiyundong Scenic and Historic Area
  - Taihang Daxiagu Scenic and Historic Area
  - Xiangtangshan Scenic and Historic Area
  - Wahuanggong Scenic and Historic Area
- Shanxi
  - Wutaishan Scenic and Historic Area
  - Hengshan Scenic and Historic Area, Hunyuan
  - Huanghe Hukou Pubu Scenic and Historic Area (trans-provincial NHSA, shared with Shaanxi)
  - Beiwudangshan Scenic and Historic Area
  - Wulaofeng Scenic and Historic Area
  - Qikou Scenic and Historic Area
- Inner Mongolia
  - Zalantun Scenic and Historic Area
  - Ergun Scenic and Historic Area
- Liaoning
  - Anshan Qianshan Scenic and Historic Area
  - Yalujiang Scenic and Historic Area
  - Jinshitan Scenic and Historic Area
  - Xingcheng Haibin Scenic and Historic Area
  - Dalian Haibin - Lüshunkou Scenic and Historic Area
  - Fenghuangshan Scenic and Historic Area
  - Benxi Shuidong Scenic and Historic Area
  - Qingshangou Scenic and Historic Area
  - Yiwulüshan Scenic and Historic Area
- Jilin
  - Songhuahu Scenic and Historic Area
  - "Badabu" - Jingyuetan Scenic and Historic Area
  - Xianjingtai Scenic and Historic Area
  - Fangchuan Scenic and Historic Area
- Heilongjiang
  - Jingpohu Scenic and Historic Area
  - Wudalianchi Scenic and Historic Area
  - Taiyangdao Scenic and Historic Area
  - Dazhanhe Scenic and Historic Area
- Jiangsu
  - Taihu Scenic and Historic Area
  - Nanjing Zhongshan Scenic and Historic Area
  - Yuntaishan Scenic and Historic Area
  - Shugang Shouxihu Scenic and Historic Area
  - Sanshan Scenic and Historic Area
- Zhejiang
  - Hangzhou Xihu Scenic and Historic Area
  - Fuchunjiang - Xin'anjiang Scenic and Historic Area
  - Yandangshan Scenic and Historic Area
  - Putuoshan Scenic and Historic Area
  - Tiantaishan Scenic and Historic Area, Tiantai
  - Shengsi Liedao Scenic and Historic Area
  - Nanxijiang Scenic and Historic Area
  - Moganshan Scenic and Historic Area
  - Xuedoushan Scenic and Historic Area
  - Shuanglong Scenic and Historic Area
  - Xiandu Scenic and Historic Area
  - Jianglangshan Scenic and Historic Area
  - Xianju Scenic and Historic Area
  - Huanjiang - Wuxie Scenic and Historic Area
  - Fangyan Scenic and Historic Area
  - Baizhangji - Feiyunhu Scenic and Historic Area
  - Fangshan - Changyu Dongtian Scenic and Historic Area
  - Tianmushan Scenic and Historic Area, Xinchang
  - Dahongyan Scenic and Historic Area
  - Dapanshan Scenic and Historic Area
  - Taozhu Scenic and Historic Area
  - Xianhuashan Scenic and Historic Area
- Anhui
  - Huangshan Scenic and Historic Area
  - Jiuhuashan Scenic and Historic Area
  - Tianzhushan Scenic and Historic Area
  - Langyashan Scenic and Historic Area
  - Qiyunshan Scenic and Historic Area
  - Caishi Scenic and Historic Area
  - Chaohu Scenic and Historic Area
  - Huashan Miku - Jianjiang Scenic and Historic Area
  - Taijidong Scenic and Historic Area
  - Huatinghu Scenic and Historic Area
  - Longchuan Scenic and Historic Area
  - Qishan - Pingtianhu Scenic and Historic Area
- Fujian
  - Wuyishan Scenic and Historic Area
  - Qingyuanshan Scenic and Historic Area
  - Gulangyu - Wanshishan Scenic and Historic Area
  - Taimushan Scenic and Historic Area
  - Taoyuandong - Linyin Shilin Scenic and Historic Area
  - Taining Scenic and Historic Area
  - Yuanyangxi Scenic and Historic Area
  - Haitan Scenic and Historic Area
  - Guanzhishan Scenic and Historic Area (locally pronounced Guanzhaishan)
  - Gushan Scenic and Historic Area
  - Yuhuadong Scenic and Historic Area
  - Shibachongxi Scenic and Historic Area
  - Qingyunshan Scenic and Historic Area
  - Fozishan Scenic and Historic Area
  - Baoshan Scenic and Historic Area
  - Fu'an Baiyunshan Scenic and Historic Area
  - Lingtongshan Scenic and Historic Area
  - Meizhoudao Scenic and Historic Area
  - Jiulongji Scenic and Historic Area
- Jiangxi
  - Lushan Scenic and Historic Area
  - Jinggangshan Scenic and Historic Area
  - Sanqingshan Scenic and Historic Area
  - Longhushan Scenic and Historic Area
  - Xiannühu Scenic and Historic Area
  - Sanbaishan Scenic and Historic Area
  - Meiling - Tengwangge Scenic and Historic Area
  - Guifeng Scenic and Historic Area
  - Gaoling - Yaoli Scenic and Historic Area
  - Wugongshan Scenic and Historic Area
  - Yunjushan - Zhelinhu Scenic and Historic Area
  - Lingshan Scenic and Historic Area
  - Shennongyuan Scenic and Historic Area
  - Damaoshan Scenic and Historic Area
  - Ruijin Scenic and Historic Area
  - Xiaowudang Scenic and Historic Area
  - Yangqishan Scenic and Historic Area
  - Hanxianyan Scenic and Historic Area
- Shandong
  - Taishan Scenic and Historic Area
  - Qingdao Laoshan Scenic and Historic Area
  - Jiaodong Bandao Haibin Scenic and Historic Area
  - Boshan Scenic and Historic Area
  - Qingzhou Scenic and Historic Area
  - Qianfoshan Scenic and Historic Area
- Henan
  - Jigongshan Scenic and Historic Area
  - Luoyang Longmen Scenic and Historic Area
  - Songshan Scenic and Historic Area
  - Wangwushan - Yuntaishan Scenic and Historic Area
  - Shirenshan Scenic and Historic Area
  - Linlüshan Scenic and Historic Area
  - Qingtianhe Scenic and Historic Area
  - Shennongshan Scenic and Historic Area
  - Tongbaishan - Huaiyuan Scenic and Historic Area
  - Zhengzhou Huanghe Scenic and Historic Area
- Hubei
  - Wuhan Donghu Scenic and Historic Area
  - Wudangshan Scenic and Historic Area
  - Changjiang Sanxia Scenic and Historic Area (trans-provincial NHSA, shared with Chongqing)
  - Dahongshan Scenic and Historic Area
  - Longzhong Scenic and Historic Area
  - Jiugongshan Scenic and Historic Area
  - Lushui Scenic and Historic Area
  - Danjiangkou Shuiku Scenic and Historic Area
- Hunan
  - Hengshan Scenic and Historic Area, Hengyang
  - Wulingyuan Scenic and Historic Area
  - Yueyanglou Dongtinghu Scenic and Historic Area
  - Shaoshan Scenic and Historic Area
  - Yuelushan Scenic and Historic Area
  - Langshan Scenic and Historic Area
  - Mengdonghe Scenic and Historic Area
  - Taohuayuan Scenic and Historic Area
  - Ziquejie Titian - Meishan Longgong Scenic and Historic Area
  - Dehang Scenic and Historic Area
  - Suxianling - Wanhuayan Scenic and Historic Area
  - Nanshan Scenic and Historic Area
  - Wanfoshan - Dongzhai Scenic and Historic Area
  - Huxingshan - Huayao Scenic and Historic Area
  - Dongjianghu Scenic and Historic Area
  - Fenghuang Scenic and Historic Area
  - Weishan Scenic and Historic Area
  - Yandiling Scenic and Historic Area
  - Baishuidong Scenic and Historic Area
  - Jiuyishan - Shundiling Scenic and Historic Area
  - Liye - Wulongshan Scenic and Historic Area
- Guangdong
  - Zhaoqing Xinghu Scenic and Historic Area
  - Xiqiaoshan Scenic and Historic Area
  - Danxiashan Scenic and Historic Area
  - Baiyunshan Scenic and Historic Area
  - Huizhou Xihu Scenic and Historic Area
  - Luofushan Scenic and Historic Area
  - Huguangyan Scenic and Historic Area
  - Wutongshan Scenic and Historic Area
- Guangxi
  - Guilin Lijiang Scenic and Historic Area
  - Guiping Xishan Scenic and Historic Area
  - Huashan Scenic and Historic Area
- Hainan
  - Sanya Redai Haibin Scenic and Historic Area
- Chongqing
  - Changjiang Sanxia Scenic and Historic Area (trans-provincial NSHA, shared with Hubei)
  - Chongqing Jinyunshan Scenic and Historic Area
  - Jinfoshan Scenic and Historic Area
  - Simianshan Scenic and Historic Area
  - Furongjiang Scenic and Historic Area
  - Tiankeng Difeng Scenic and Historic Area
  - Tanzhangxia Scenic and Historic Area
- Sichuan
  - Emeishan Scenic and Historic Area
  - Huanglongsi - Jiuzhaigou Scenic and Historic Area
  - Qingchengshan -Dujiangyan Scenic and Historic Area
  - Jianmen Shudao Scenic and Historic Area
  - Konggar Shan Scenic and Historic Area
  - Shunan Zhuhai Scenic and Historic Area
  - Xiling Xueshan Scenic and Historic Area
  - Siguniangshan Scenic and Historic Areas
  - Shihai Dongxiang Scenic and Historic Area
  - Qionghai - Luojishan Scenic and Historic Area
  - Bailonghu Scenic and Historic Area
  - Guangwushan - Nuoshuihe Scenic and Historic Area
  - Tiantaishan Scenic and Historic Area, Qionglai
  - Longmenshan Scenic and Historic Area
  - Micangshan Daxiagu Scenic and Historic Area
- Guizhou
  - Huangguoshu Scenic and Historic Area
  - Zhijindong Scenic and Historic Area
  - Wuyanghe Scenic and Historic Area
  - Hongfenghu Scenic and Historic Area
  - Longgong Scenic and Historic Area
  - Libo Zhangjiang Scenic and Historic Area
  - Chishui Scenic and Historic Area
  - Malinghe Xiagu Scenic and Historic Area
  - Duyun Doupengshan - Jianjiang Scenic and Historic Area
  - Jiudongtian Scenic and Historic Area
  - Jiulongdong Scenic and Historic Area
  - Liping Dongxiang Scenic and Historic Area
  - Ziyun Getuhe Chuandong Scenic and Historic Area
  - Pingtang Scenic and Historic Area
  - Rongjiang Miaoshan Dongshui Scenic and Historic Area
  - Shiqian Wenquanqun Scenic and Historic Area
  - Yanhe Wujiang Shanxia Scenic and Historic Area
  - Weng'an Jiangjiehe Scenic and Historic Area
- Yunnan
  - Lunan Shilin Scenic and Historic Area (officially designated name. “Lunan Yi Autonomous County” was renamed as “Shilin Yi Autonomous County” on October 8, 1998.)
  - Dali Scenic and Historic Area
  - Xishuangbanna Scenic and Historic Area
  - Sanjiangbingliu Scenic and Historic Area
  - Kunming Dianchi Scenic and Historic Area
  - Lijiang Yulong Xueshan Scenic and Historic Area
  - Tengchong Dire Huoshan Scenic and Historic Area
  - Ruilijiang - Dayingjiang Scenic and Historic Area
  - Jiuxiang Scenic and Historic Area
  - Jianshui Scenic and Historic Area
  - Puzhehei Scenic and Historic Area
  - Alu Scenic and Historic Area
- Tibet
  - Yarlung He Scenic and Historic Area
  - Namco - Nyainqêntanglha Shan Scenic and Historic Area
  - Tanggulashan - Nujiangyuan Scenic and Historic Area
  - Tulin - Gugê Scenic and Historic Area
- Shaanxi
  - Huashan Scenic and Historic Area
  - Lintong Lishan Scenic and Historic Area
  - Huanghe Hukou Pubu Scenic and Historic Area (trans-provincial NSHA, shared with Shanxi)
  - Baoji Tiantaishan Scenic and Historic Area
  - Huangdiling Scenic and Historic Area
  - Heyang Qiachuan Scenic and Historic Area (Qiachuan: locally pronounced Hechuan)
- Gansu
  - Maijishan Scenic and Historic Area
  - Kongtongshan Scenic and Historic Area
  - Mingshashan - Yueyaquan Scenic and Historic Area
  - Guanshan Lianhuatai Scenic and Historic Area
- Qinghai
  - Qinghaihu Scenic and Historic Area
- Ningxia
  - Xixia Wangling Scenic and Historic Area
  - Xumishan Shiku Scenic and Historic Area
- Xinjiang
  - Tianshan Tianchi Scenic and Historic Area
  - Kumtag Shamo Scenic and Historic Area
  - Bosten Hu Scenic and Historic Area
  - Sairam Hu Scenic and Historic Area
  - Lopren Cunzhai Scenic and Historic Area (alt. “Lop People's Stockade Village”)
  - Tomur Daxiagu Scenic and Historic Area
