= Danxia =

Danxia may refer to:

- Mount Danxia, scenic mountain in Guangdong, China
- Danxia landform, named after the mountain
- China Danxia, collective name of six areas of Danxia landform inscribed on the World Heritage Site

== See also ==
- Zhangye Danxia National Geological Park
