= Nanling Mountains =

Mountain range in Southern China

- 南嶺
- Location within China

Highest point
- Peak: Kitten Mountain
- Elevation: 2,142 m (7,028 ft)
- Coordinates: 25°10′N 112°20′E

Dimensions
- Length: 600 km (370 mi) E/W
- Width: 200 km (120 mi) N/E

Geography
- Location: Guangxi, Guangdong, Hunan and Jiangxi

Nanling Mountains
- Traditional Chinese: 南嶺
- Simplified Chinese: 南岭
- Literal meaning: Southern Ridges
Transcriptions
Standard Mandarin
- Hanyu Pinyin: Nánlǐng
- Wade–Giles: Nan-ling
Yue: Cantonese
- Jyutping: Nam^{4} leng^{5}

Five Ranges
- Traditional Chinese: 五嶺
- Simplified Chinese: 五岭
Transcriptions
Standard Mandarin
- Hanyu Pinyin: Wǔ Lǐng
- Wade–Giles: Wu Ling
Yue: Cantonese
- Jyutping: Ng^{5} Leng^{5}

Southern Mountains
- Chinese: 南山
Transcriptions
Standard Mandarin
- Hanyu Pinyin: Nánshān
- Wade–Giles: Nan Shan
Yue: Cantonese
- Jyutping: Naam^{4} saan^{1}

The Nanling (simplified Chinese: 南岭; traditional Chinese: 南嶺; pinyin: Nánlǐng; Jyutping: naam4 ling5; lit. 'Southern Mountains'), also known as the Wuling (simplified Chinese: 五岭; traditional Chinese: 五嶺; pinyin: Wǔlǐng; Jyutping: ng5 ling5; lit. 'Five Mountains'), is a major mountain range in Southern China that separates the Pearl River Basin from the Yangtze Valley and serves as the dividing line between south and central subtropical zones. The main range of Nanling Mountains stretches from west to east for about 600 kilometers (370 mi) from Guilin and Hezhou of the eastern Guangxi to Ganzhou of the southern Jiangxi, north to south about 200 kilometres (120 mi) from Yongzhou and Chenzhou of the southern Hunan to Qingyuan and Shaoguan of the northern Guangdong; With their branches, the mountains run west to east for 1,400 kilometers (870 mi).

There are trough basins in the Nanling; most of the western basins in Nanling Mountains are composed of limestone, where karst regions are located. Most of the eastern basins are made up of red sandstone, where danxia landform areas are found.

The Nanling are boundaries between the four provinces of Guangdong, Guangxi, Hunan and Jiangxi, and also the cultural boundaries. To the south of the mountains are Lingnan culture areas.

The Nanling is a corridor where Chinese ethnic groups migrate and also the land of national amalgamation. In the Nanling, there form trough corridors, tectonic fault basins or watersheds, where are relatively low and not difficult to climb, between the natural gorge channels and the river systems in the north and south of the Nanling are natural channels, people-to-people exchanges are easy. Since the Qin dynasty, from the Central Plains into Lingnan (the south of the Nanling) there have been five ancient roads, which are YuechengLing Road(越城嶺道), Mengzhuling Road (萌渚嶺道), Qitianling Road (騎田嶺道), Lingling-Guiyang Path (零陵桂陽嶠道) and Dayuling Road (大庾嶺道). At the same time, many tributaries of the Yangtze system and Pearl River system have also formed west to east passages.

The mountains forming the ranges are generally of moderate altitude, the highest point being the summit of Kitten Mountain at 2,142 meters (7,028 ft).

The Nanling mountains are a regional biodiversity hot spot for endemic species of plants, birds and amphibians.

== Ranges ==
The five mountain ranges that make up the Nanling are the:

- Yuecheng Mountains (越城嶺)
- Dupang Mountains (都龐嶺)
- Mengzhu Mountains (萌渚嶺)
- Qitian Mountains (騎田嶺)
- Dayu Mountains (大庾嶺)

The Nanling Mountains separate Central China from South China. Areas south of the ranges are tropical in climate, permitting two crops of white rice to be grown each year.

Ion adsorption clays are mined by open-pit methods in the Nanling region, and form a major source of rare earth elements in the world.

== See also ==
- Haiyang Mountains
- Jiuyi Mountains
- Mount Danxia
- Lotus Mountain Range
