= Feng Jinglan =

Chinese mineralogist and geologist

- 冯景兰
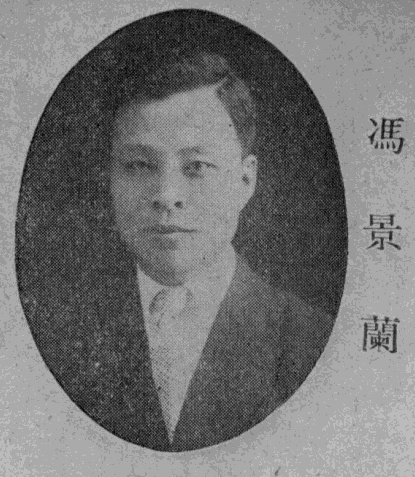
- Born: 9 March 1898; Tanghe County, Hebei, Qing China
- Died: 29 September 1976 (aged 78); Beijing, China
- Education: Peking University; Colorado School of Mines; Columbia University
- Scientific career
- Fields: Geology; Mineralogy
- Workplaces: China University of Geosciences (Beijing)

Chinese name
- Simplified Chinese: 冯景兰
- Traditional Chinese: 馮景蘭
Transcriptions
Standard Mandarin
- Hanyu Pinyin: Féng Jǐnglán

Feng Jinglan (9 March 1898 – 29 September 1976), courtesy name Huaixi (淮西 or 怀西), was a Chinese mineralogist and geologist. He was one of the founders of mineralogy in China. He was an academician of the Chinese Academy of Sciences.

== Biography ==
Feng was born into a landlord's family in the town of Qiyi, in Tanghe County, Hebei, on 9 March 1898, to Feng Taiyi (冯台异), an assistant to the Qing government official Zhang Zhidong, and Wu Qingzhi (吴清芝). His elder brother Feng Youlan (1895–1990) was a philosopher. His younger sister Feng Yuanjun (1900–1974) was a writer. He secondary studied at Henan Provincial Second School in Kaifeng. In 1916, he was admitted to Peking University. In 1918, he pursued advanced studies in the United States on government scholarships, first studying mine geology in Colorado School of Mines and then studying mineralogy, petrology and physiography in Columbia University with a master's degree in 1923.

He returned to China in 1923 and that same year became an instructor at Zhongzhou University (中州大学). In his spare time, he studied the sand dunes near Kaifeng and explored the control of the Yellow River. In 1927, he went to Heishanzhai (黑山寨) in Changping, Hebei to investigate the geology of gold deposits, which was one of the earliest modern deposit geological work in China.

In 1927, he was recruited as a technician of Guangzhou Geological Survey Institute, where he investigated the geology and mineral resources along the railway near Guangzhou. He discovered and named Danxia landform in Mount Danxia of Renhua County.

In 1929, he moved to Peiyang University, he remained at the university until 1933. During this period, he investigated the geology and mineral resources along the Shenyang–Haikou railway in Liaoning, the genesis of Xuanlong Iron Ore in Hebei, and the geology of Northern Shaanxi. In 1933, he joined the faculty of Tsinghua University. From 1933 to 1937, during the summer vacation, he and others investigated the geology and mineral resources of Pingquan, Datong, Zhaoyuan and Mount Tai.

After the outbreak of the Second Sino-Japanese War, Tsinghua University was forced to move south to form National Southwestern Associated University with Peking University in Kunming, where he concurrently served as dean of the Institute of Technology and head of the Department of Mining of Yunnan University. During this period, he mainly studied the copper mines in Sichuan and Yunnan. After war, he moved back to Beijing with the university.

After the establishment of the Communist State, he was hired as a professor by Beijing Institute of Geology (now China University of Geosciences (Beijing)). In 1966, Mao Zedong launched the Cultural Revolution, Feng was labeled as a "reactionary academic authority". In November 1969, he was sent to the May Seventh Cadre Schools to do farm works with his wife in Xiajiang County, Jiangxi, working until the spring of 1972.

On 29 September 1976, he died of a heart attack in Beijing, aged 78.

== Legacy ==
After Feng's death, his children donated 100,000 yuan saved during his lifetime to China University of Geosciences (Beijing) in October 1998 to establish the "Feng Jinglan Prize" to reward teachers and students with outstanding academic achievements who have made outstanding contributions to the development of geological education.

== Honours and awards ==
- 1957 Member of the Chinese Academy of Sciences (CAS)
