= Mount Langshan =

Mountain in Hunan, China

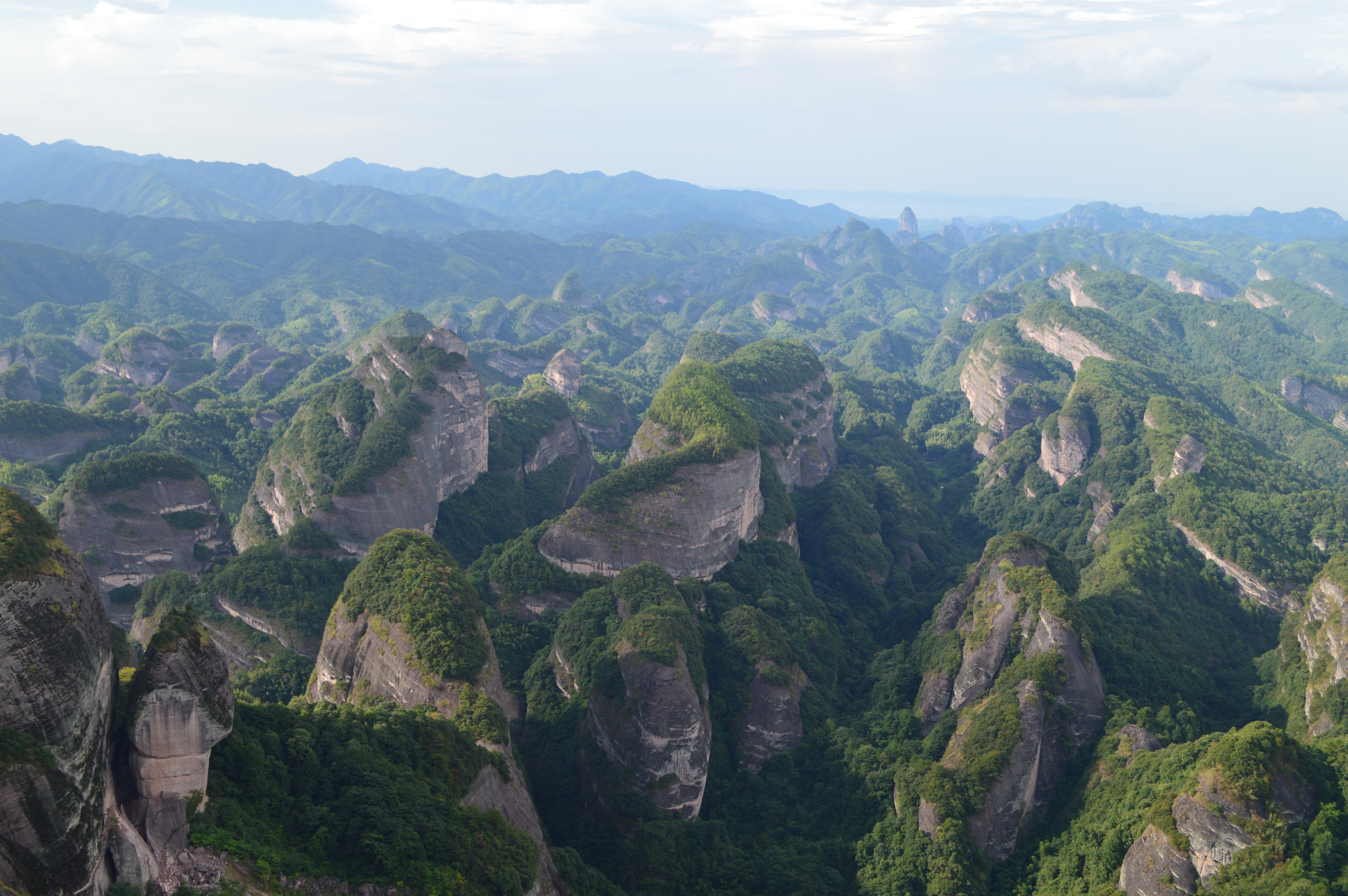
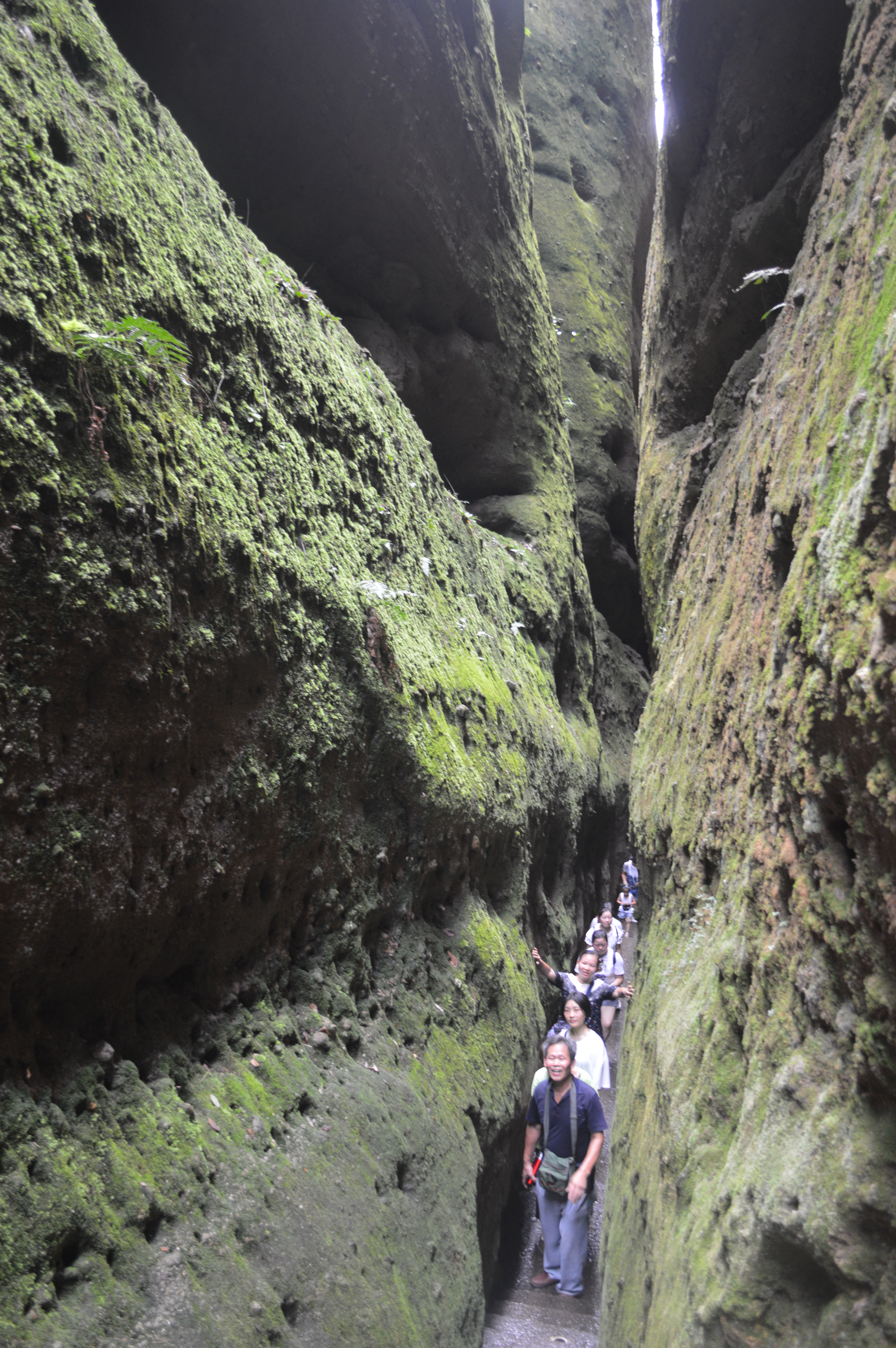
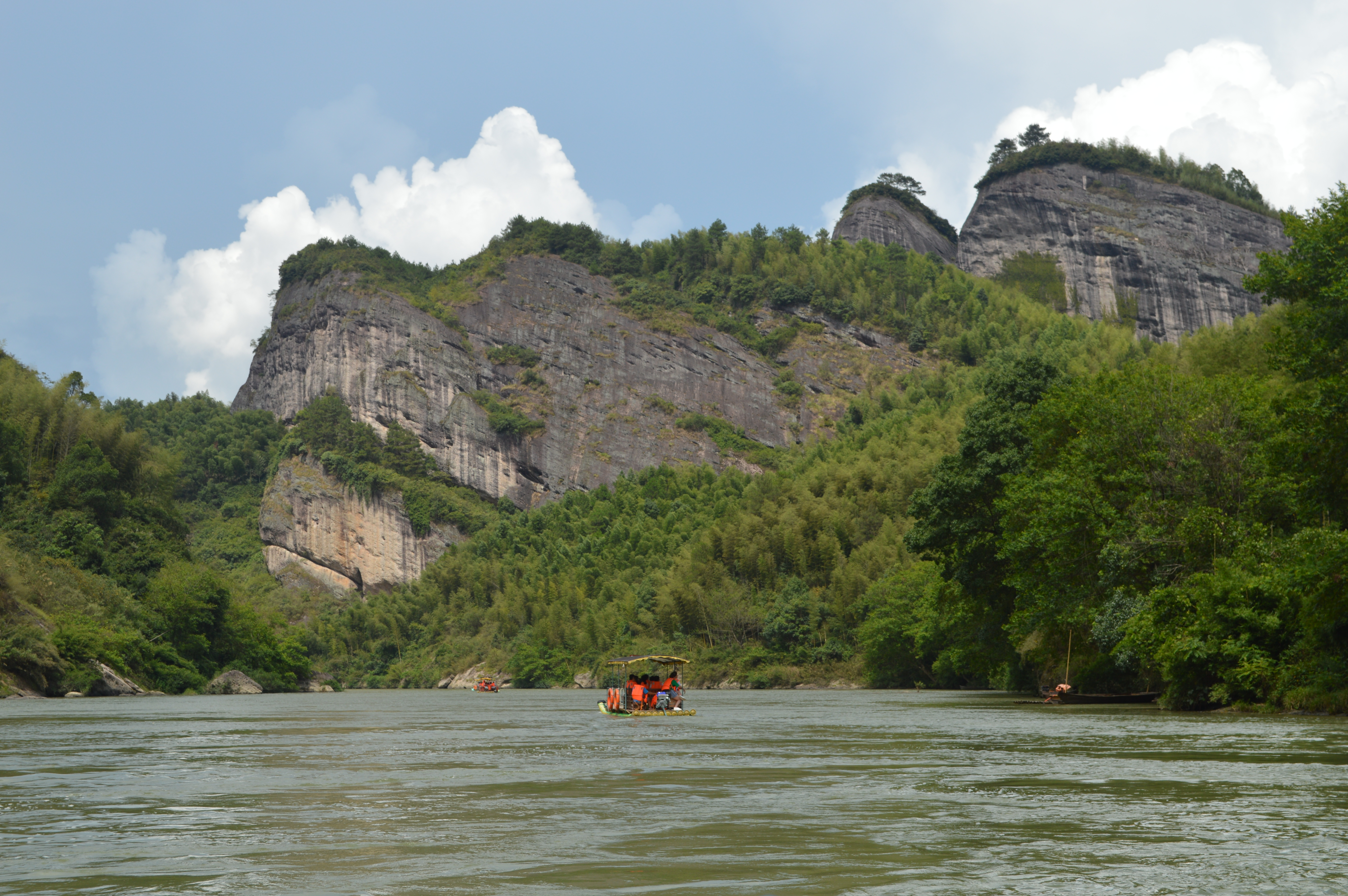
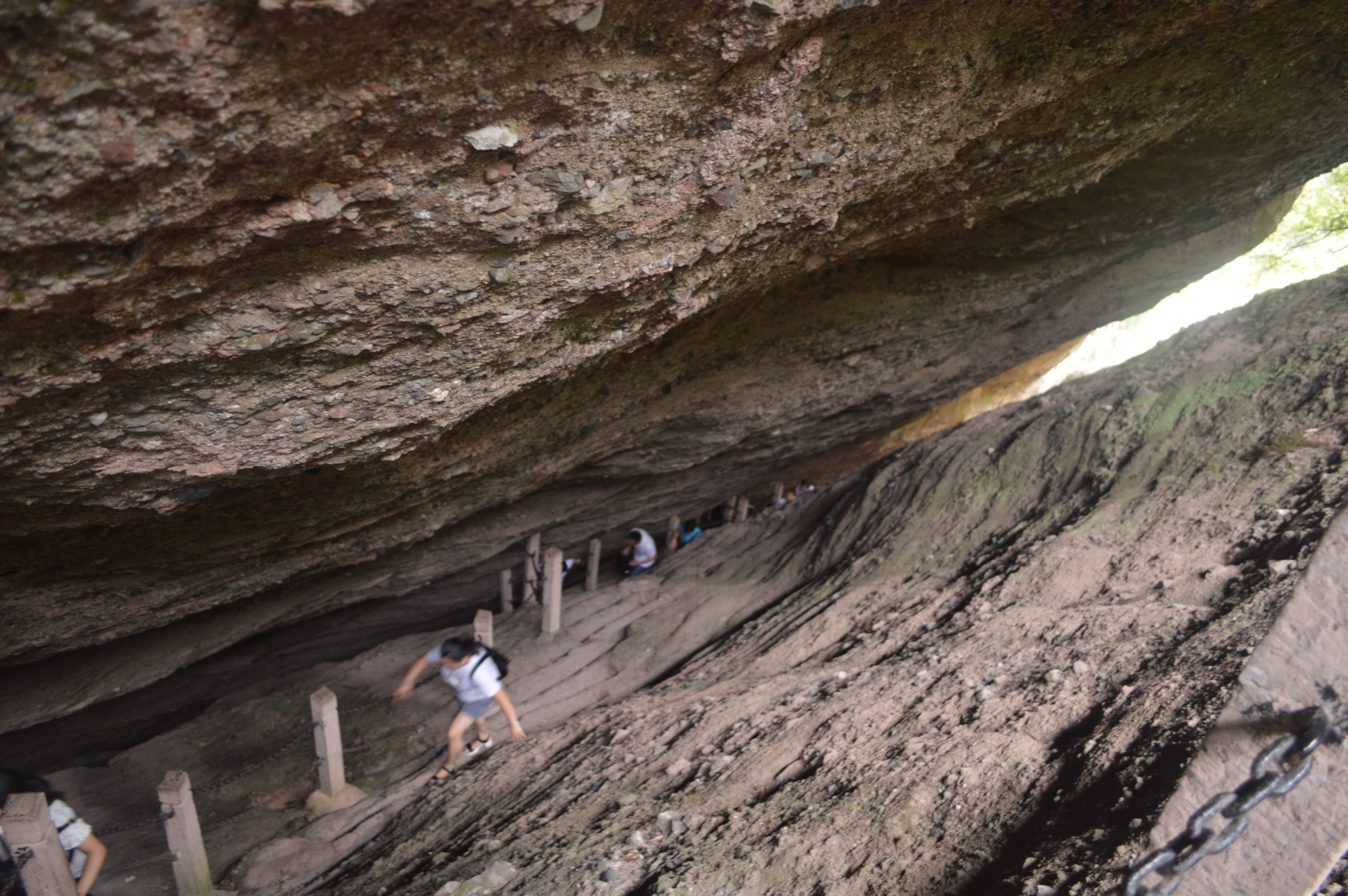
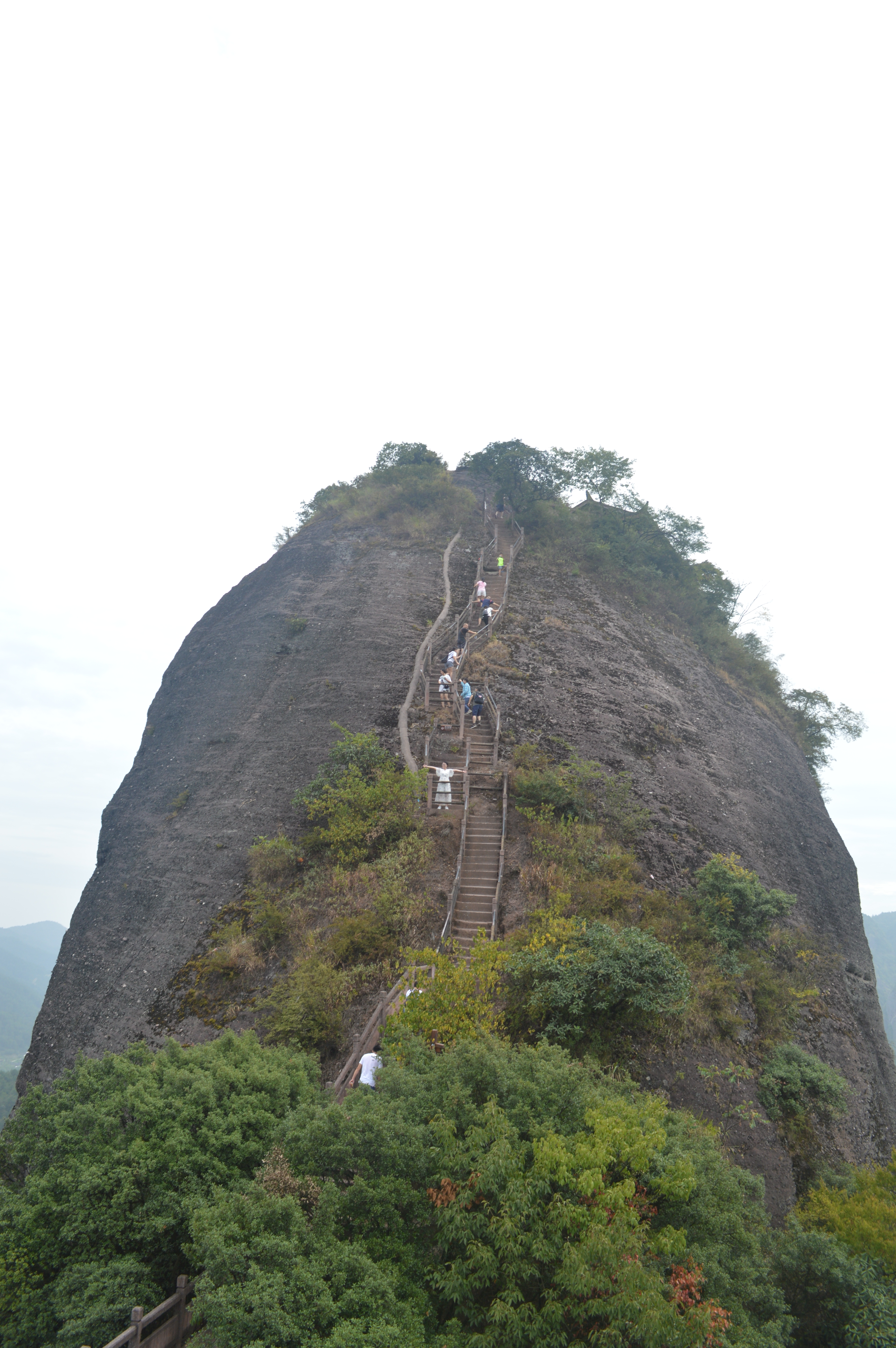
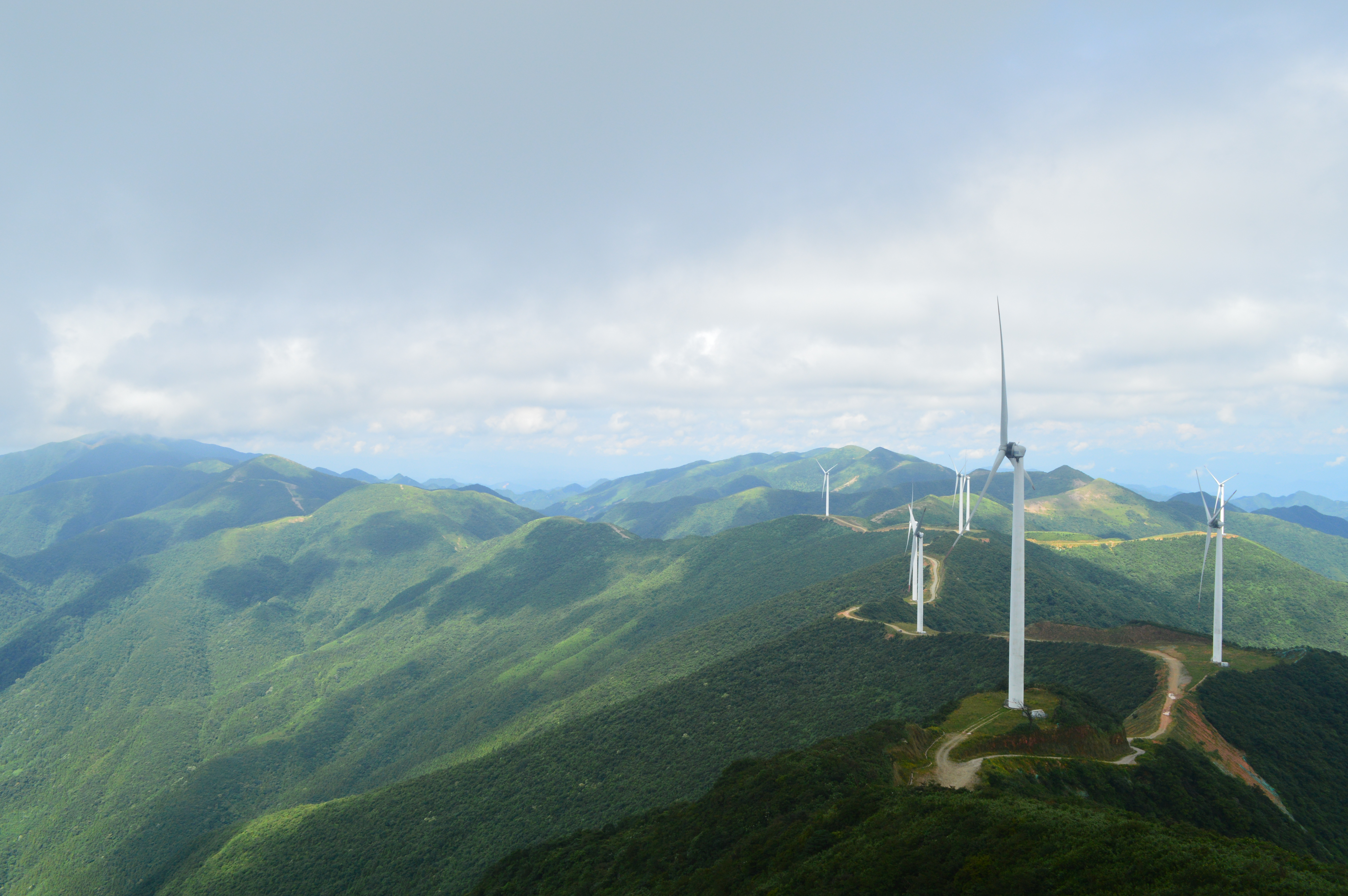
- Mount Langshan

Highest point
- Elevation: 818-metre (2,684 ft)
- Coordinates: 26°23′27.96″N 110°45′06.48″E

Naming
- Native name: 崀山 (Chinese)

Geography
- Location within Hunan
- Location: Xinning County, Hunan, China

UNESCO World Heritage Site
- Official name: China Danxia
- Type: Natural
- Criteria: vii, viii
- Designated: 2010 (34th session)
- Reference no.: 1335
- Region: Asia-Pacific

Langshan or Mount Lang (Chinese: 崀山) is a mountain and a scenic area in Xinning County, Hunan, China. It is described on the local signage as a "world famous UNESCO geopark of China" and was inscribed as part of the China Danxia World Heritage Site in 2010 because of its unique geological formations and spectacular scenery. Its peak elevation is 818 metres (2,684 ft).

== History ==
In 2000, it has been designated as a "National Rock Climbing Training Base" by the General Administration of Sport of China.

In October 2001, it was classified as a "National Geological Park" by the Ministry of Land and Resources.

In May 2002, it was authorized as a "National Key Scenic Spot".

On January 16, 2006, it was inscribed to the National Natural Heritage List by the Ministry of Construction.

In 2010, it was categorized as an AAAA level tourist site by the China National Tourism Administration.

In the 2010 UNESCO list of world heritage sites, Langshan was designated a natural World Heritage Site as part of China's Danxia landform.

On August 3, 2016, it has been categorized as an AAAAA level tourist site by the China National Tourism Administration.

== Natural history ==
Within the boundaries of the area, the following number of species are known to live: 26 species of mammals, 94 species of birds, 35 species of reptiles, 19 species of amphibians, 36 species of fish, about 816 species of insects, over 1,421 vascular plants species and 150 fungus

=== Rivers ===
The Fuyi River, a tributary of the Zi River, flows through the area.

== Tourist attractions ==
- Pepper Peak and Camel Peak Scenic Area
- Danxia Linear Valley
- The First Line in the World

== Gallery ==
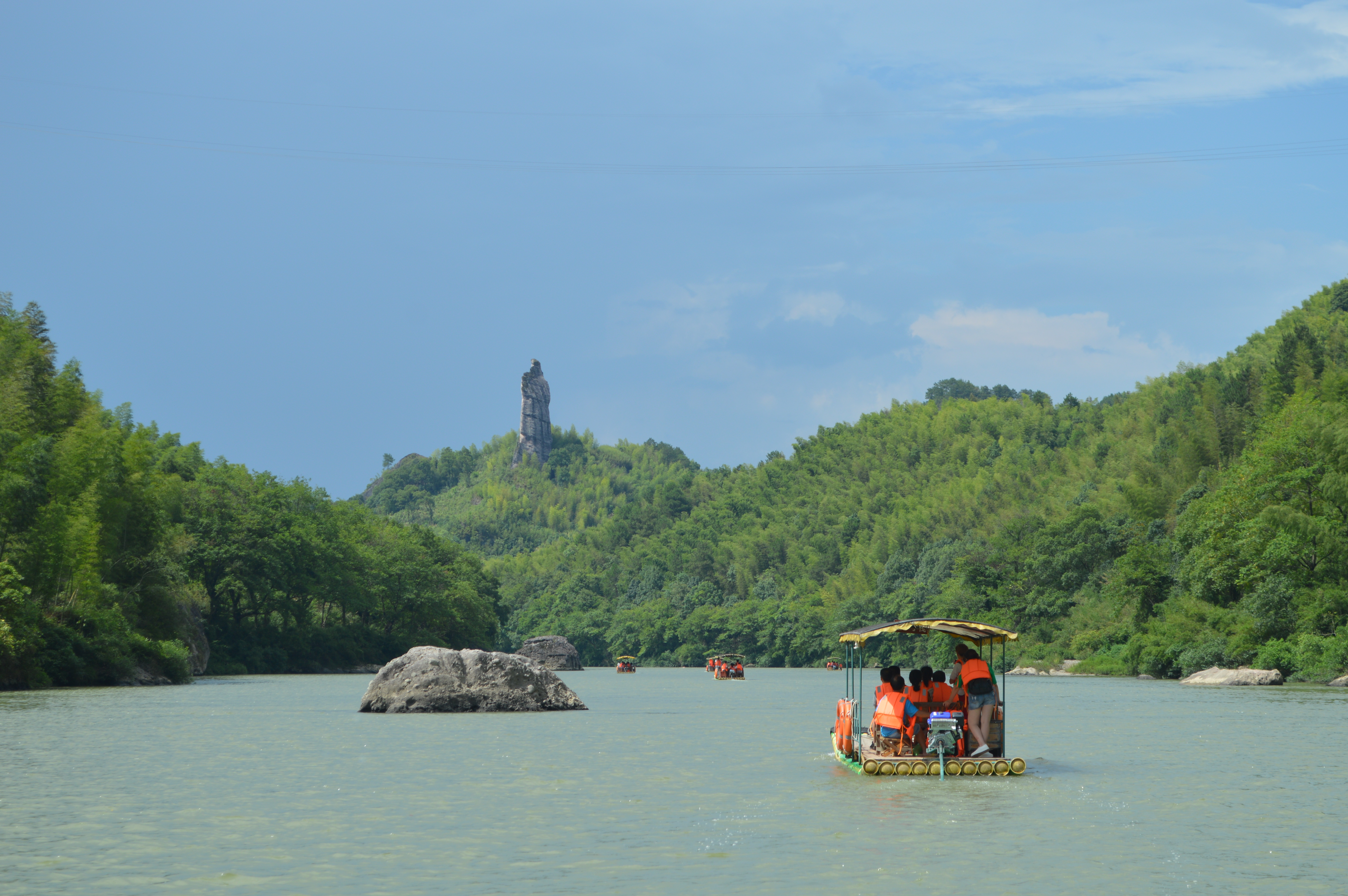
Fuyi River.

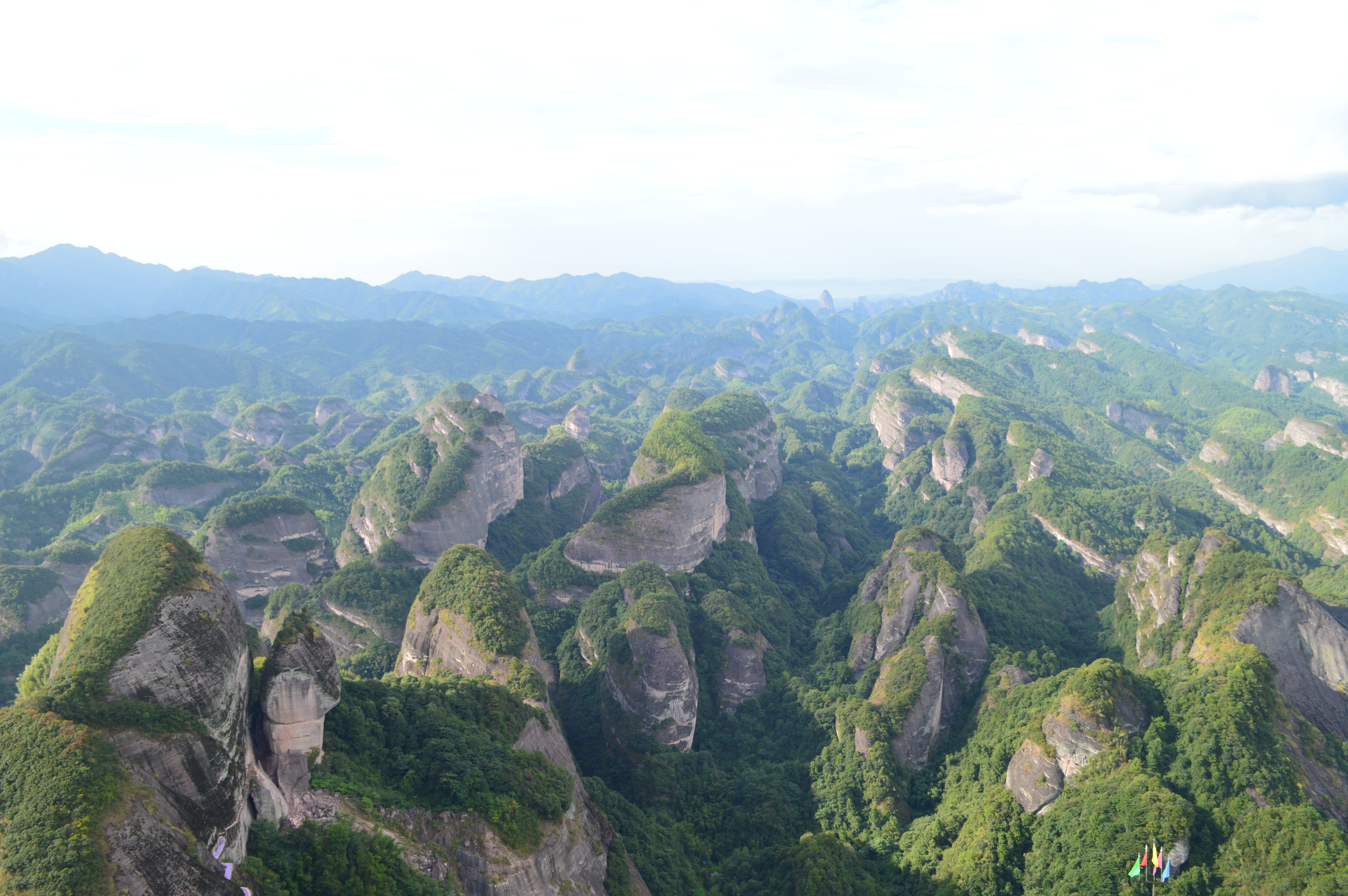
Mount Langshan.

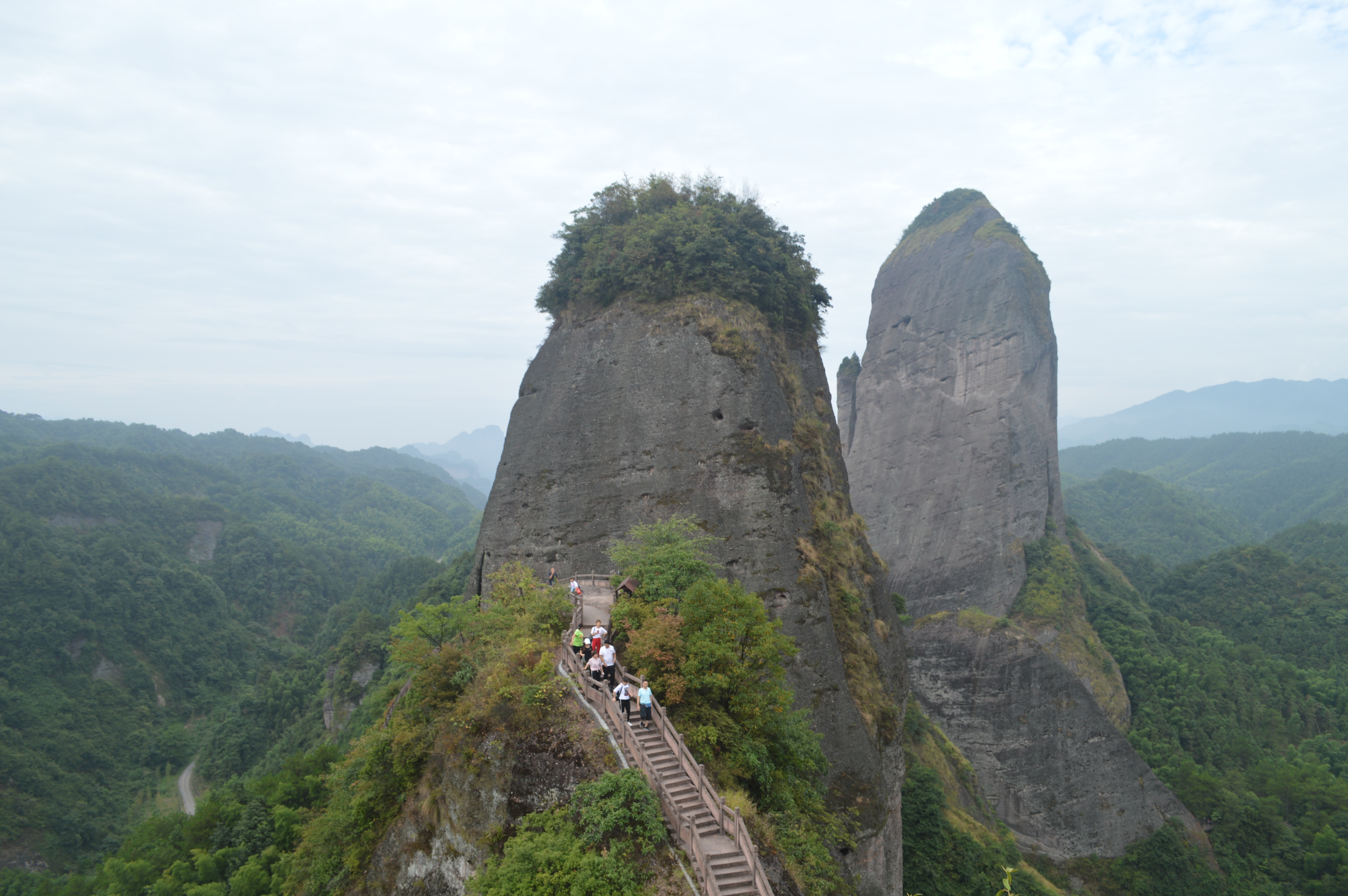
Pepper Peak and Camel Peak Scenic Area.
