= Eupithecia wangi =

Scientific classification
- Kingdom: Animalia
- Phylum: Arthropoda
- Clade: Pancrustacea
- Class: Insecta
- Order: Lepidoptera
- Family: Geometridae
- Genus: Eupithecia
- Species: E. wangi

Binomial name
- Eupithecia wangi Mironov & Galsworthy, 2011

Species of moth

Eupithecia wangi is a moth in the family Geometridae. It is found in Guangxi, China. It is named for Wang Min, Chinese entomologist who collected the type series from Maoershan, Guilin.

The wingspan is about 20–22 mm (0.79–0.87 in).
