= Lüliang Dawu Airport =

Airport in Shanxi, China

Lüliang Dawu Airport 吕梁大武机场
- IATA: LLV; ICAO: ZBLL

Summary
- Airport type: Public
- Serves: Lüliang, Shanxi, China
- Location: Dawu, Fangshan County
- Opened: 26 January 2014; 12 years ago
- Coordinates: 37°41′00″N 111°08′34″E

Map
- Location of airport in Shanxi

Runways
| Direction | Length | | Surface |
| Direction | m | ft | Surface |
|---|---|---|---|
| 18/36 | 2,600 | 8,530 | Asphalt |

Statistics (2025)
- Passengers: 574,729
- Aircraft movements: 7,081
- Cargo (metric tons): 1,090.4

Lüliang Dawu Airport
- Simplified Chinese: 吕梁大武机场
- Traditional Chinese: 呂梁大武機場
Transcriptions
Standard Mandarin
- Hanyu Pinyin: Lǚliáng Dàwǔ Jīchǎng

Lvliang Dawu Airport or Lüliang Dawu Airport (IATA: LLV, ICAO: ZBLL) is an airport serving the city of Lüliang in Shanxi Province, China. It is located near the town of Dawu in Fangshan County, 20.5 kilometers from the city center. Construction of the airport began on 21 February 2009 with an investment of 764 million yuan, and was originally projected to be finished in 2011. The actual completion time was late 2013, and the airport was opened on 26 January 2014.

It was a notorious "ghost airport" around 2015; despite its size and cost, it handled just three to five flights per day. By 2019, this number had grown to more than 17 flights per day.

== History ==
On November 13, 2006, three potential sites were initially selected for the construction of Lüliang Airport: Tianjiahuiyuan in Licheng District, Sunjiashan in Dawu Town, Fangshan County, and Xinglongwan in Yukou Town, Fangshan County.

The final selected location for the airport was Dawu Town, approximately 20.5 kilometers from downtown Lüliang. It was positioned as a domestic feeder airport and the construction began on February 21, 2009. The airport was designed to 4C-level flight zone standards, capable of handling aircraft such as the CRJ-200, Boeing 737-800, Airbus A319, and Airbus A320. The terminal building had an area of 13,000 square meters, a runway of 2,600 meters, and was designed to handle 200,000 passengers and 900 tons of cargo annually. Construction was completed in 2013, with a total investment of 764 million yuan. The airport was officially opened to traffic on January 26, 2014.

== Facilities ==
The airport will have one runway that is 2,600 meters long and 45 meters wide (class 4C), and a 13,000-square-meter terminal building. It is projected to handle 200,000 passengers and 900 tons of cargo annually by 2020.

== Airlines and destinations ==
| Airlines | Destinations |
|---|---|
| Air China | Beijing–Capital |
| Chengdu Airlines | Guiyang, Shenyang |
| China Eastern Airlines | Shanghai–Pudong, Xi'an |
| China Express Airlines | Chongqing, Harbin, Nanjing, Xi'an |
| China United Airlines | Beijing–Daxing, Kunming |
| Loong Air | Hangzhou, Yinchuan |
| Sichuan Airlines | Chengdu–Tianfu |
| Suparna Airlines | Wuhan |
| Tianjin Airlines | Haikou, Tianjin |

== See also ==
- List of airports in China
