= Chaochuan Formation =

Geologic formation in Zhejiang, China

- Stratigraphic range: Albian-Cenomanian; ~112–94 Ma
- Type: Formation
- Underlies: Fangyan Formation
- Overlies: Early Cretaceous tuff and Moshishan Group
- Thickness: up to 518 metres (1,699 ft)

Lithology
- Primary: Sandstone, siltstone
- Other: Tuff

Location
- Coordinates: 28.7°N 119.2°E
- Approximate paleocoordinates: 35.6°N 117.0°E
- Region: Zhejiang Province
- Country: China
- Chaochuan Formation (China) Chaochuan Formation (Zhejiang)

The Chaochuan Formation is a geologic formation in China (Zhejiang Province). It is made up of purplish red calcarenaceous, muddy siltstone, fine-grained sandstone with interbeds of tuffaceous sandstone and conglomerate or rhyolitic tuff.

== Fossil content ==
The following fossils were reported from the formation:

Color key: Taxon / Reclassified taxon / Taxon falsely reported as present / Dubious taxon or junior synonym / Ichnotaxon / Ootaxon / Morphotaxon	Notes; Uncertain or tentative taxa are in small text; ~~crossed out~~ taxa are discredited.

=== Dinosaurs ===
==== Ornithischians ====
Ornithischians of the Chaochuan Formation
Genus	Species	Location	Stratigraphic position	Material	Notes	Image
Dongyangopelta	D. yangyanensis	Zhejiang Province, China	Albian to Cenomanian		A nodosaurid ankylosaur	
Zhejiangosaurus	Z. lishuiensis	Zhejiang Province, China	Canomanian		A euankylosaurian anylosaur	

==== Theropods ====
Theropods of the Chaochuan Formation
Genus	Species	Location	Stratigraphic position	Material	Notes	Image
Therizinosauridae Indet.	Indeterminate	Zhejiang Province, China	Cenomanian		A therizinosaurid therizinosauroid; once known as "Chilantaisaurus" zheziangensis	
Grallator	G. isp.	Zhejiang Province, China		14 isolated tracks	Likely produced by a non-arctometatarsalian theropods	
cf. Asianopodus	cf. I. isp.	Zhejiang Province, China		21 tracks	Showing possible gregarious behavior based on all tracks oriented in the sane direction. Likely produced by an ornithomimosaurian trackmaker.	
