= Carex setschwanensis =

Scientific classification
- Kingdom: Plantae
- Clade: Tracheophytes
- Clade: Angiosperms
- Clade: Monocots
- Clade: Commelinids
- Order: Poales
- Family: Cyperaceae
- Genus: Carex
- Species: C. setschwanensis

Binomial name
- Carex setschwanensis (Hand.-Mazz.) S.R.Zhang

Synonyms
- Kobresia setschwanensis Hand.-Mazz.; Kobresia longearistita P.C.Li; Kobresia pinetorum F.T.Wang & Tang ex P.C.Li

Species of sedge

Carex setschwanensis is a tussock-forming perennial in the family Cyperaceae. It is endemic to parts of Tibet and central China including the province of Qinghai.

== Description ==
C. setschwanensis has a short rhizome with dull to slightly shiny persistent and prominent basal sheaths. It has erect and densely tufted culms that are triangular in cross-section and are typically 5 to 20 cm (2.0 to 7.9 in) in length but can be as long as 40 cm (16 in). The culms are quite slender with a width that is 0.7 to 1.3 mm (0.028 to 0.051 in). The leaves are found at the base of the plant and are usually slightly shorter than the culms. The leaves are stiff and have a folded blade and a width of 1 to 2 mm (0.039 to 0.079 in). The plant blooms between May and September producing a greenish brown cylindric inflorescence in the form of a dense spike.

== Range ==
The grass is mostly found growing in subarctic and subalpine areas in Asia extending from Tibet in the east to western parts of central China.

== See also ==
- List of Carex species
