= Jiujiang Power Station =

Power Station in Jiujiang

Jiujiang Power Station 九江发电厂
- Country: China
- Location: Jiujiang, Jiangxi
- Purpose: Power
- Construction began: June 1977

Jiujiang Power Station (Chinese: 九江发电厂), also spelled Jiujiang Power Plant, is a large-scale thermal power project located at Jinji Slope (金鸡坡) where 5 km to the east of Jiujiang, Jiangxi, with a total installed capacity of 1350MW. This project is the largest thermal power plant in Jiangxi and Central China. The third phase of Jiujiang Power Station cost nearly 5 billion yuan, including 29.6 billion Japanese yen loans from the Japanese Overseas Economic Cooperation Fund(日本海外经济协力基金), accounting for 50% of the total investment.

== History ==
The construction of the project started in June 1977, and the two 125MW units of the first phase of the project were put into production in September 1983 and September 1984.

Two 200MW units were installed in the second phase of the project, which were connected to the grid for power generation in November 1991 and September 1992, respectively. The two 350MW units of the third phase of the project officially entered operation in July and December 2003 respectively.

== Obtained a loan from OECF ==
The third phase of the expansion project of Jiujiang Power Station is the first power project constructed with foreign capital in Jiangxi Province. The project was constructed using loans from Japanese Overseas Economic Cooperation Fund (OECF) and partial financing from China.
