= Mount Jianglang =

Mountain in Zhejiang, China

- Jiāngláng Shān
- Location within China

Highest point
- Elevation: 816.8 m (2,680 ft)
- Listing: List of mountains of China
- Coordinates: 28°31′47″N 118°33′55″E

Geography
- Location: Zhejiang, China

Jianglangshan or Mount Jianglang (Chinese: 江郎山; pinyin: Jiāngláng Shān) is a mountain in Jiangshan, Zhejiang, China. Three peaks from north to south make its recognizable "river-shaped" arrangement, as follows: Lang Feng, Ya Feng and Ling Feng. Lang Feng has elevation of 816.8 m (2,680 ft).

The mountain exhibits Danxia landform, and was inscribed onto the World Heritage List in August 2010 as part of China Danxia.

In September 2013, Mount Jianglang was the scene for a stunt by Jeb Corliss where he flew between two of the peaks in a wingsuit, starting the jump from a helicopter.

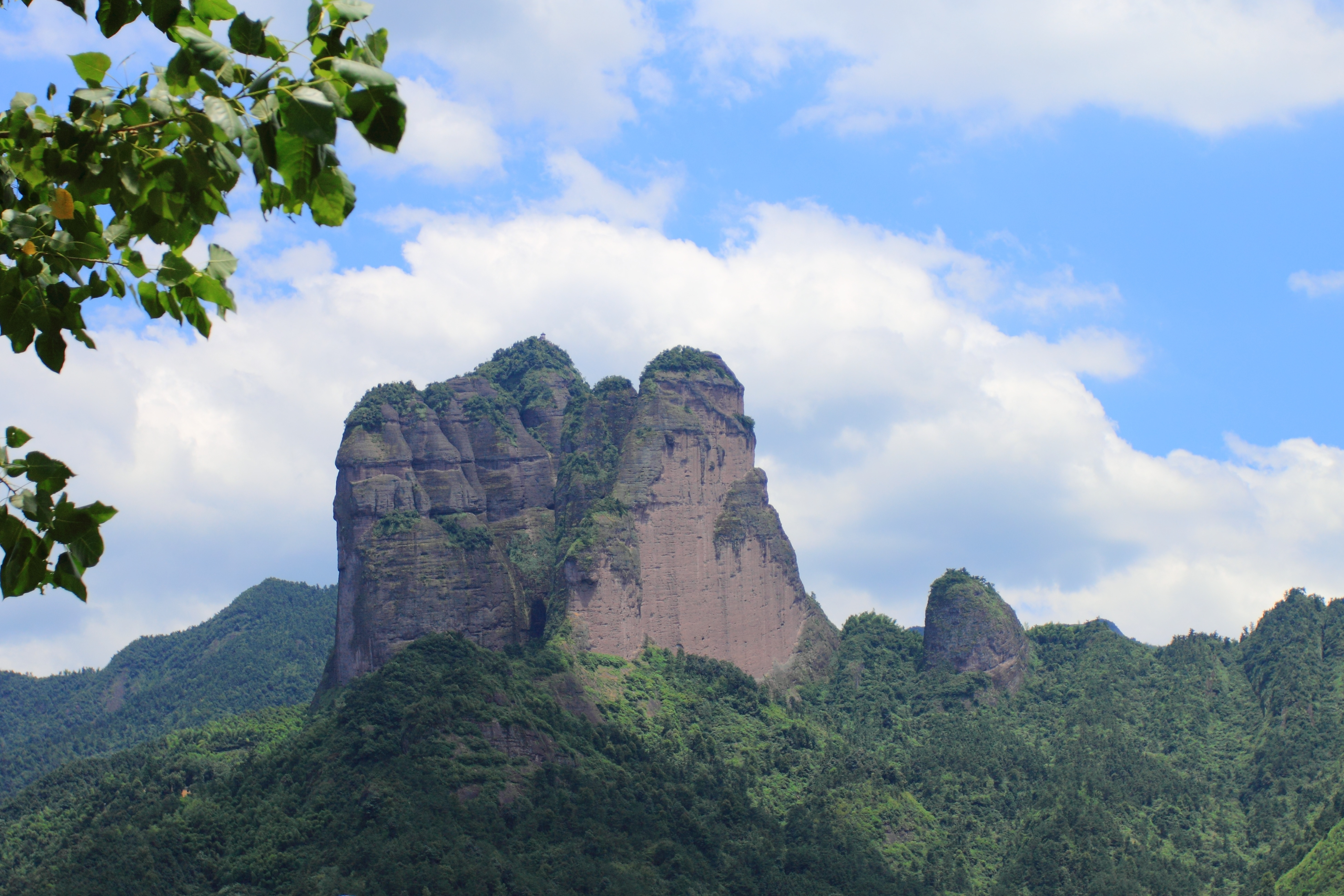

== See also ==
- List of National Scenic and Historic Areas of China
