= North Wudang =

Mountain in the country of China

Coordinates: 37°46′33″N 111°20′25″E

The North Wudang Mountain or Mount Beiwudang (Chinese: 北武当山; pinyin: Běiwǔdāng Shān), also known as Zhenwu Mountain (Chinese: 真武山; pinyin: Zhēnwǔ Shān), is located in Fangshan County, Lüliang, Shanxi Province, China.

In ancient times, North Wudang Mountain was known as Longwang (Dragon King) Mountain. It is one of the holy places of Taoism. North Wudang Mountain combines the majesty of Mount Tai with the strangeness of Huangshan Mountain, the dangers of Huashan Mountain, the glorious beauty of Emei Mountain and the quiet contemplativeness of Qingcheng Mountain. To all four sides, the main peaks are practically surrounded by steep wall cliffs. It is only possible to climb up to the misty top by a single manmade trail. Every step along the path to the apex, one can hear the frustrated melody of the "sound of stone." The mountains are filled with a veritable forest of strange stones. The five-thousand-kilo "turtle stones" are poised on the edge of cliffs, rocking back and forth and risking a tumble at the slightest push from a breath of wind. This is why these stones are also called "wind moving stones." They are one of the mountain's rare sights.
