= Fangyan Formation =

Geologic formation in Dongyang, China

- Stratigraphic range: Late Cretaceous, 100.5–85 Ma
- Type: Formation
- Underlies: Chaochuan Formation and Moshishau Group
- Overlies: Guantou Formation and Zhaochuan Formation
- Thickness: up to 1,700 metres (5,600 ft)

Lithology
- Primary: Conglomerate

Location
- Country: China

The Fangyan Formation is a geologic formation in China (Dongyang). It is made up of mainly conglomerates. It preserves dinosaur fossils dating back to the Late Cretaceous.

== Fossil content ==
Color key: Taxon / Reclassified taxon / Taxon falsely reported as present / Dubious taxon or junior synonym / Ichnotaxon / Ootaxon / Morphotaxon	Notes; Uncertain or tentative taxa are in small text; ~~crossed out~~ taxa are discredited.

=== Dinosaurs ===
==== Sauropods ====
Sauropods of the Fangyan Formation
Genus	Species	Location	Stratigraphic position	Material	Notes	Image
Dongyangosaurus	D. sinensis	Zhejiang Province, China	Turonian to Coniacian	Partial postcranial skeleton.	A titanosaurian sauropod	
