= Kitten Mountain =

Mountain in Guangxi, China

- Mao'er Mountains
- Location within Guangxi

Highest point
- Elevation: 2,142 m (7,028 ft)
- Prominence: 1,861.5 metres (6,107 ft)
- Listing: Ultra
- Coordinates: 25°48′N 110°20′E

Geography
- Location: Xing'an County, Guangxi
- Parent range: Yuecheng Mountains, Nan Range

Kitten Mountain (also Mao'er Mountains; Chinese: 猫儿山; pinyin: Māo'ér Shān) is a 2,142-metre (7,028 ft) mountain located on the border between Ziyuan County and Xing'an County, Guangxi Zhuang Autonomous Region (GZAR) in the People's Republic of China that lies about 80 kilometres (50 mi) from the prefecture-level city of Guilin.

== Description ==
The peak lies in the Yuecheng Mountains, part of the Nan Mountains and dates to the Neoproterozoic Era from 1,000 to 539 million years ago. Kitten Mountain is the highest peak in Guangxi, with a prominence of 1,861.5 metres (6,107 ft) above the surrounding area, and it is a National Level Nature Reserve.

=== World War II plane crash ===
On August 31, 1944, a Consolidated B-24 Liberator aircraft of the United States Army Air Corps crashed on Kitten Mountain following a bombing raid on Japanese warships off the coast of Taiwan. The ten man crew were listed as missing in action for 52 years until the remains of the aircraft were discovered in 1996 by two local youths searching for medicinal herbs.

== See also ==
- List of ultras of Tibet, East Asia and neighbouring areas
