= Danxia landform =

Set of landscapes found in China

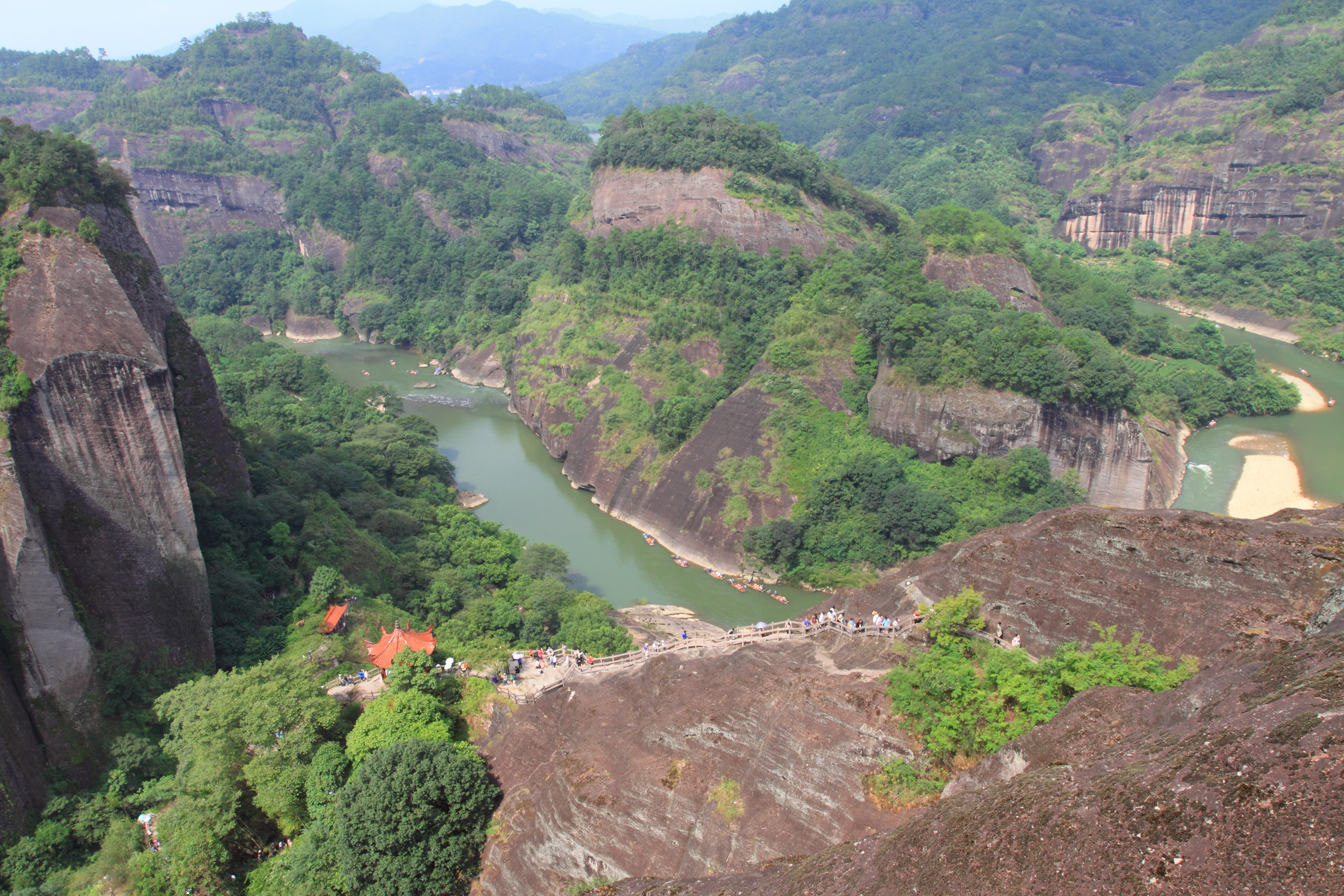
Hiking trail at Tianyou Peak

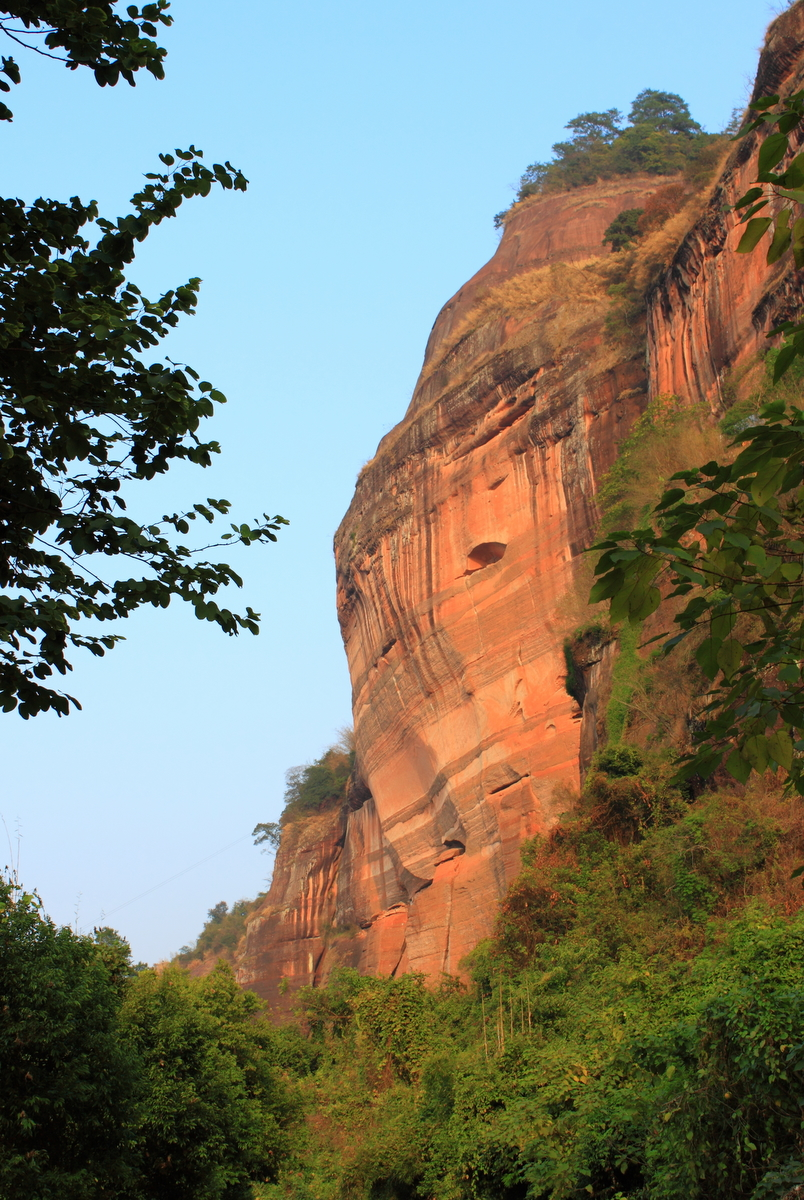
Red Cliff

The Danxia landform (Chinese: 丹霞地貌; pinyin: dānxiá dìmào; Jyutping: daan1haa4 dei6maau6) is a set of landscapes found in southeast, southwest and northwest China that "consist of a red bed characterized by steep cliffs". It is a unique type of petrographic geomorphology found in China. Danxia landform is formed from red-coloured sandstones and conglomerates of largely Cretaceous age. The landforms look very much like karst topography that forms in areas underlain by limestones, but since the rocks that form danxia are sandstones and conglomerates, they have been called "pseudo-karst" landforms. They were formed by endogenous forces (including uplift) and exogenous forces (including weathering and erosion).

The first studies on what are now referred to as Danxia landforms were conducted at Mount Danxia near Shaoguan, China. In the 1920s and 1930s Chinese geologists made an effort to learn more about these interesting geomorphic structures. Danxia landforms are made up of uplifted continental crust that has been faulted and eroded, exposing large scarps of layered rock, red in color.

Danxia landforms cover several provinces in southeast China. Taining County, Fujian Province, has very good examples of "young" danxia landforms wherein deep, narrow valleys have been formed. As the landform gets older, valleys widen and one gets isolated towers and ridges. The danxia landform is named after Mount Danxia, one of the most famous examples of the danxia landform. A very peculiar feature of danxia landscape is the development of numerous caves of various sizes and shapes. The caves tend to be shallow and isolated, unlike true karst terrain where caves tend to form deep, interconnecting networks. In 2010, several danxia landscapes in southern China, with a general name of "China Danxia", were inscribed as a World Heritage Site. The six inscribed danxia landform areas are: Mount Langshan and Mount Wanfo (Hunan Province), Mount Danxia (Guangdong Province), Taining and Mount Guanzhi (Fujian Province), Mount Longhu and Guifeng (Jiangxi Province), Fangyan, Mount Jianglang (Zhejiang Province), and Mount Chishui (Guizhou Province). The total core area of 6 regions above is 73,945 hectares (182,720 acres), and the total buffer area is 65,446 hectares (161,720 acres). Other notable danxia areas, such as Zhangye Danxia National Geological Park, are not included in the World Heritage Site.

== Geology ==
Around 80 million years ago (Ma) cretaceous red sandstone and conglomerate was laid down by sedimentation from the lakes and streams. After another 15 million years, tectonic plate movements created many faults. About 23 Ma, movement of the Himalayan range disturbed the land around the danxia landform in the Guangdong province uplifting and completely changing the topography of the area. Over millions of years the steep cliffs that can be seen today, exposed by faults, were formed through weathering and erosion. This geology can be seen at Danxiashan Geopark in China, where there is about 290 square kilometers of streams, forest and towering danxian rock formations.

== Origin of name ==
In 1928, the mineral scientist Feng Jinglan noticed the widespread distribution of the red oxidation layer. Feng Jinglan realized that this was an undescribed landform. He decided to name it as danxia, which comes from the poem The Hibiscus Pool by Cao Pi of the 3rd century. The name "danxia" refers to "丹 (vermilion) 霞 (sunglow)" in Chinese.

== Studies ==
In an effort to learn more about danxia topography, a study on the geomorphology of an area in China was conducted. Mount Danxia was the focus of the research, taking Digital Elevation Matrix (DEM) based data from many watersheds and basins in the area. Understanding the hydrology of the area can tell a lot about the nearby formations. For example, "localized erosion has enhanced deepening of existing fractures rather than lateral erosion to form deep and narrow valleys, while long-term erosion provided large and gentle watersheds." This study used ArcGIS. These scientists took maps of the area and overlaid certain features they wanted to measure, such as stream length and size.

== China Danxia ==
Danxia landform
UNESCO World Heritage Site
- Location within Earth
- Official name: China Danxia
- Location: China
- Criteria: Natural: (vii), (viii)
- Reference: 1335
- Inscription: 2010 (34th Session)
- Area: 82,151 ha (203,000 acres)
- Buffer zone: 218,357 ha (539,570 acres)
- Website: www.dxdm.com/En/index.aspx
- Coordinates: 28°25′19″N 106°2′33″E

China Danxia, or Danxia landform of China, is a subset of the Danxia landforms which, in August 2010, entered the World Heritage List.

Serial ID Number	Name & Location	Coordinates	Area	Photo
1335-001	Chishui - West Section	28°22′11″N 105°47′39″E	Property: 10142 Ha; Buffer zone: Ha	
1335-002	Chishui - East Section	28°25′19″N 106°02′33″E	Property: 17222 Ha; Buffer zone: Ha	
1335-003	Taining - North Section	27°00′37″N 117°13′07″E	Property: 5277 Ha; Buffer zone: Ha	
1335-004	Taining -South Section	26°51′56″N 117°02′22″E	Property: 5810 Ha; Buffer zone: Ha	
1335-005	Langshan	26°20′24″N 110°46′45″E	Property: 6600 Ha; Buffer zone: 6200 Ha	
1335-006	Danxiashan	24°57′55″N 113°42′12″E	Property: 16800 Ha; Buffer zone: 12400 Ha	
1335-007	Longhushan: Longhushan Section	28°04′15″N 116°59′05″E	Property: 16950 Ha; Buffer zone: Ha	
1335-008	Longhushan: Guifeng Section	28°19′03″N 117°25′10″E	Property: 2740 Ha; Buffer zone: Ha	
1335-009	Jianglangshan	28°31′47″N 118°33′55″E	Property: 610 Ha; Buffer zone: 571 Ha	

== See also ==
- Zhangye Danxia National Geological Park
