= Yuecheng Mountains =

Mountain range along the Guangdong-Hunan border in China

Coordinates: 26°0′6″N 110°49′28″E

Geography
- Location: on the border between Hunan and Guangxi

The Yuecheng Mountains (Chinese: 越城岭; pinyin: Yuèchéng Lǐng), also known as Laoshanjie (老山界), are a mountain range that lies on the border between Hunan Province and the Guangxi Zhuang Autonomous Region, of the People's Republic of China. The range is part of the Nanling Mountains of Central China. Its highest peak is Shenmaoding of Kitten Mountain, and its second peak is Zhenbaoding (also called Beibaoding).

The Yuecheng Mountains run from the northeast to the southwest. They contain landmark peaks, including Kitten Mountain at 2,142 metres (7,028 ft) in elevation, the highest peak in Guangxi.
