= Fuyi River =

River in China

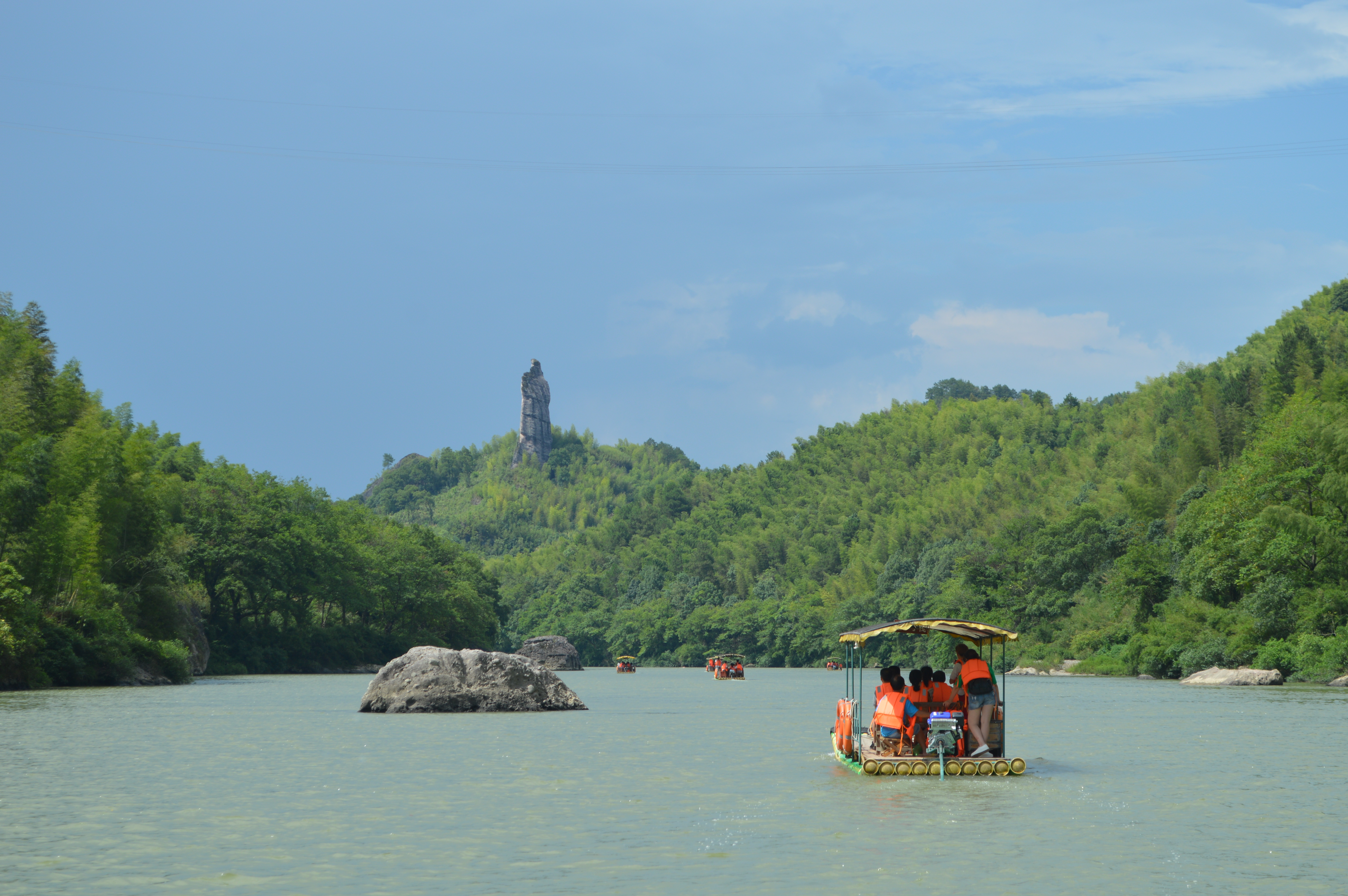
- Fuyi River within Mount Langshan National Geological Park, Hunan, China

- Location of mouth in Hunan
- Native name: 夫夷水 (Chinese)

Physical characteristics
- Source: Cat Mountain
  - location: Guangxi
- Mouth: Zi River
  - coordinates: 27°00′18″N 111°15′22″E
- Length: 352.6 km (219.1 mi)
- Basin size: 6,692 km^{2} (2,584 mi^{2})

The Fuyi River (Chinese: 夫夷水; pinyin: Fūyí Shuǐ), also known as Luojiang River (罗江), Fuyijiang (夫夷江) and Fuyihe (夫夷河) is a river in China's Guangxi and Hunan provinces. It is one of the largest tributaries of the Zi River. Fuyi River is 352.6 km (219.1 mi) long and has a drainage basin of 6,692 km^{2} (2,584 mi^{2}). The river's origin is within Cat Mountain (猫儿山), in Guangxi.

Fuyi River's main tributaries in Hunan include Xinzhai River (新寨河), Dong River (冻江), Shuang River (双江), Langhu River (崀笏河), Changhu River (长湖水), Shuicaoyuan River (水槽源河), Chenjiawan River (陈家湾), Dashui River (大水江), Luojian River (罗涧河), Peiziyuan River (培子源河), Gaoqiao River (高桥河), Dalian River (大连江), Sanlong River (三龙江), Jiefu River (界福河), Heng River (横江), Jiang River (江河), Changlong River (长龙江), Xiangshan River (香山江), Huizhu River (慧竹江), Baizhu River (白竹水), Niuqu River (牛去江), Xiangba River (响坝江), Longyuan Xiaoxi River (龙源小溪水), and Louzi River (楼子水). And its main tributaries in Guangxi include Caiyuanli River (菜园里河), Sheling River (社岭河), Dayuan River (大源河), Longxi River (龙溪河), Shixi River (石溪河), Majia River (马家河), Tianmen River (天门河), Tongzuo River (铜座河), Xianshuidong River (咸水垌河), Guali River (瓜里河), Chaping River (茶坪河), and Pingshuidi River (坪水底河).

The river passes places such as Ziyuan County, Xinning County, Shaoyang County, Chengbu Miao Autonomous County.
