= Fangshan County =

Fangshan County 方山县
- County
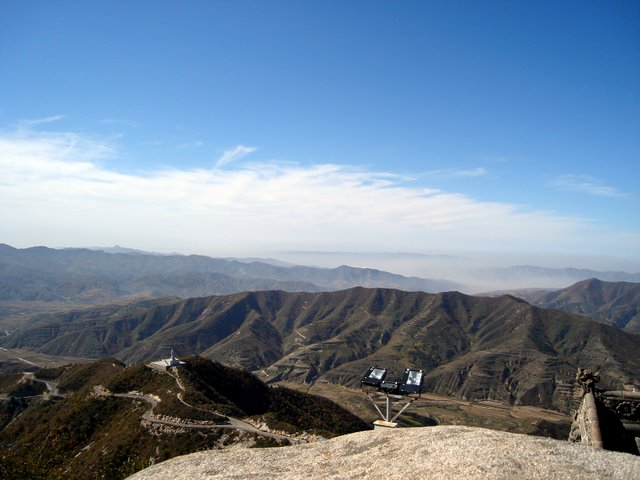

- Location of the seat in Shanxi
- Coordinates: 37.8946°N 111.2441°E
- Country: People's Republic of China
- Province: Shanxi
- Prefecture-level city: Lüliang

Population (2020)
  - Total: 112,692
- Time zone: UTC+8 (China Standard)

Fangshan (Chinese: 方山县; pinyin: Fāngshān Xiàn) is a county in the west of Shanxi province, China. It is under the administration of Lüliang City.

== Climate ==
Climate data for Fangshan, elevation 1,212 m (3,976 ft), (1991–2020 normals, extremes 1981–2010)
Month	Jan	Feb	Mar	Apr	May	Jun	Jul	Aug	Sep	Oct	Nov	Dec	Year
Record high °C (°F)	14.4 (57.9)	20.6 (69.1)	27.4 (81.3)	33.7 (92.7)	34.0 (93.2)	38.3 (100.9)	36.9 (98.4)	33.4 (92.1)	34.9 (94.8)	27.1 (80.8)	21.4 (70.5)	16.0 (60.8)	38.3 (100.9)
Mean daily maximum °C (°F)	−0.4 (31.3)	3.9 (39.0)	10.5 (50.9)	18.1 (64.6)	23.6 (74.5)	27.5 (81.5)	28.5 (83.3)	26.4 (79.5)	21.9 (71.4)	15.6 (60.1)	7.8 (46.0)	0.9 (33.6)	15.4 (59.6)
Daily mean °C (°F)	−8.2 (17.2)	−3.6 (25.5)	2.9 (37.2)	10.2 (50.4)	15.9 (60.6)	20.2 (68.4)	21.9 (71.4)	20.0 (68.0)	14.8 (58.6)	8.1 (46.6)	0.6 (33.1)	−6.5 (20.3)	8.0 (46.4)
Mean daily minimum °C (°F)	−13.5 (7.7)	−9.1 (15.6)	−2.8 (27.0)	3.3 (37.9)	8.8 (47.8)	13.6 (56.5)	16.6 (61.9)	15.1 (59.2)	9.7 (49.5)	2.9 (37.2)	−4.2 (24.4)	−11.4 (11.5)	2.4 (36.4)
Record low °C (°F)	−28.6 (−19.5)	−23.7 (−10.7)	−17.3 (0.9)	−8.4 (16.9)	−1.7 (28.9)	3.4 (38.1)	8.6 (47.5)	5.8 (42.4)	−2.0 (28.4)	−10.2 (13.6)	−21.7 (−7.1)	−27.6 (−17.7)	−28.6 (−19.5)
Average precipitation mm (inches)	3.7 (0.15)	6.8 (0.27)	12.6 (0.50)	24.0 (0.94)	38.8 (1.53)	63.6 (2.50)	129.3 (5.09)	124.8 (4.91)	84.7 (3.33)	36.9 (1.45)	15.9 (0.63)	4.0 (0.16)	545.1 (21.46)
Average precipitation days (≥ 0.1 mm)	3.1	3.7	4.9	5.6	7.5	10.2	13.0	12.0	9.9	6.9	4.9	3.1	84.8
Average snowy days	4.2	4.7	3.8	0.9	0.1	0	0	0	0	0.4	3.2	4.0	21.3
Average relative humidity (%)	55	51	46	43	45	54	68	73	71	64	60	56	57
Mean monthly sunshine hours	192.1	181.3	220.4	239.3	263.8	243.8	227.0	216.6	201.5	207.7	190.9	190.7	2,575.1
Percentage possible sunshine	63	59	59	60	60	55	51	52	55	61	64	65	59
Source: China Meteorological Administration

== See also ==
- North Wudang Mountain
