= Mount Danxia =

Mountain range in Guangdong Province, China

Danxia Range
- 丹霞山
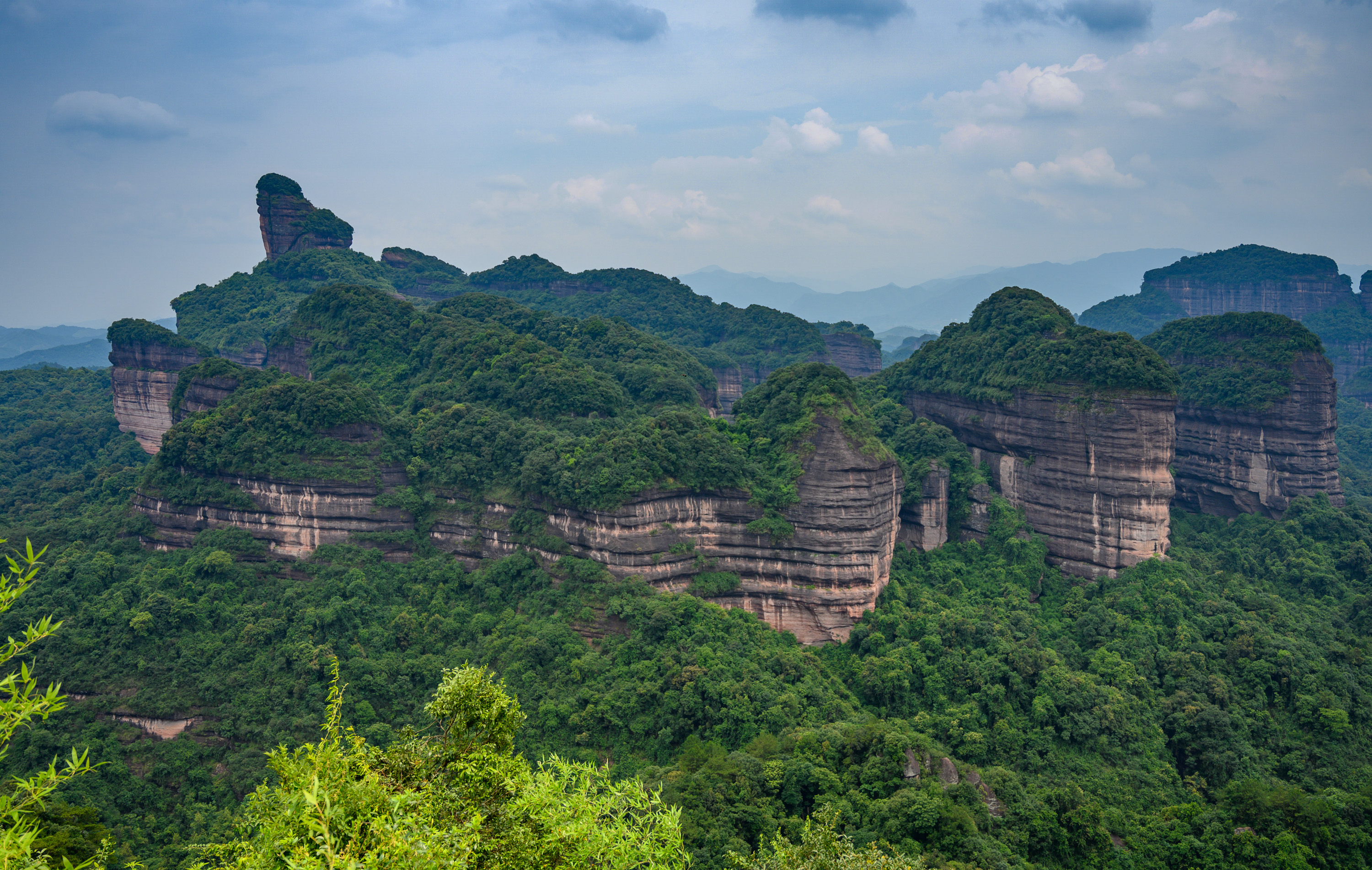
- A small part of the range

Highest point
- Listing: Mountains of China

Geography
- Location within Guangdong
- Country: China
- Province: Guangdong
- County: Renhua
- Parent range: Yuecheng Ridge, Nan Mountains

UNESCO World Heritage Site
- Official name: China Danxia
- Type: Natural
- Criteria: vii, viii
- Designated: 2010 (34th session)
- Reference no.: 1335
- Region: Asia-Pacific

Mount Danxia (Chinese: 丹霞山; pinyin: Dānxiá Shān) is a noted scenic mountainous area in Renhua County, in the northern part of Guangdong province. It is described on the local signage as a "world famous UNESCO geopark of China". It was inscribed as part of the China Danxia World Heritage Site in 2010 because of its unique geographical in formations and spectacular scenery. It is also an AAAAA Chinese attraction.

== Description ==
The Danxia area is formed from a reddish sandstone which has been eroded over time into a series of outcrops surrounded by spectacular cliffs and many unusual rock formations known as the Danxia landform. There are a number of temples located on the mountains and many scenic walks can be undertaken. There is also a river winding through the mountains on which boat trips can be taken.

== Geology ==
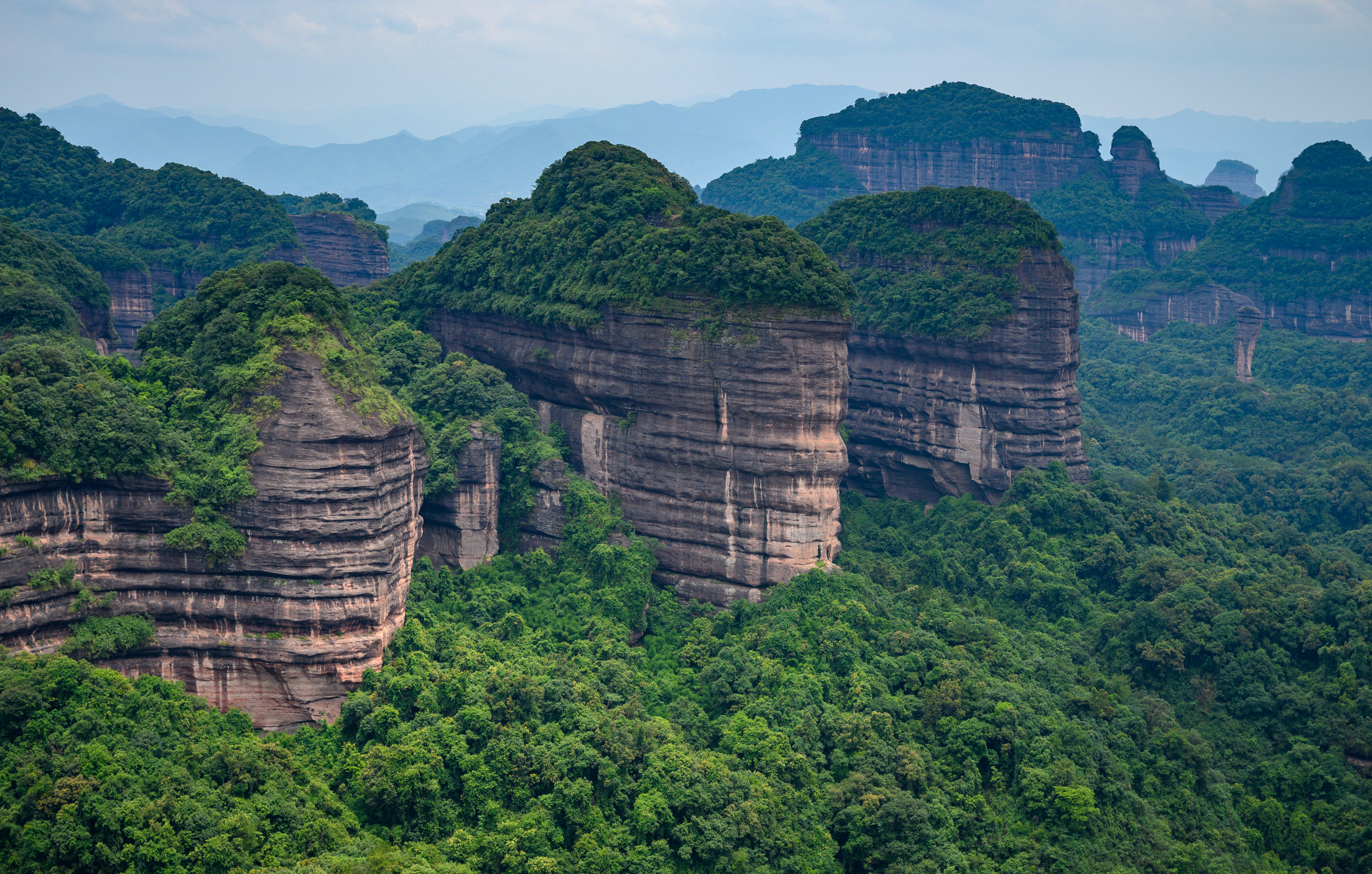
Cliffs at Danxia Range

Mount of Danxia is identified by multi-layered red sedimentary rocks of sandstone and conglomerate, and the area of was formed by the fluvial deposition through the basin 140-65 million years ago. The weather in Danxia area assist the oxidation reaction in rocks, and turned the color of them into red. Then these sediments were uplifted and condescend by water, and being accreted during the process. Finally, the area of Danxia was formed. Since six million years ago, the basin of Danxia area has experienced several intermittent rises, which average increase of about one metre (3 ft) per 10,000 years. With the favor of water washing by the river, the mount of Danxia is cut into many layers, and formed the mount of Danxia nowadays.

=== Rock formations ===
Among other attractions that make the Danxia range interesting, the area has the following characteristic stone formations:

- Yang Yuan Stone, (Yangyuan "male/father stone") bearing a remarkable resemblance to a phallus
- Yin Yuan Stone or Yinyuan hole, which somewhat resembles a vulva.
- Breasts Stone, human breast-shaped rocky outcrops on a cliff hanging 30 metres (98 ft) above the ground.
- Sleeping Beauty, a rocky range resembling a sleeping maiden.

== Climate ==
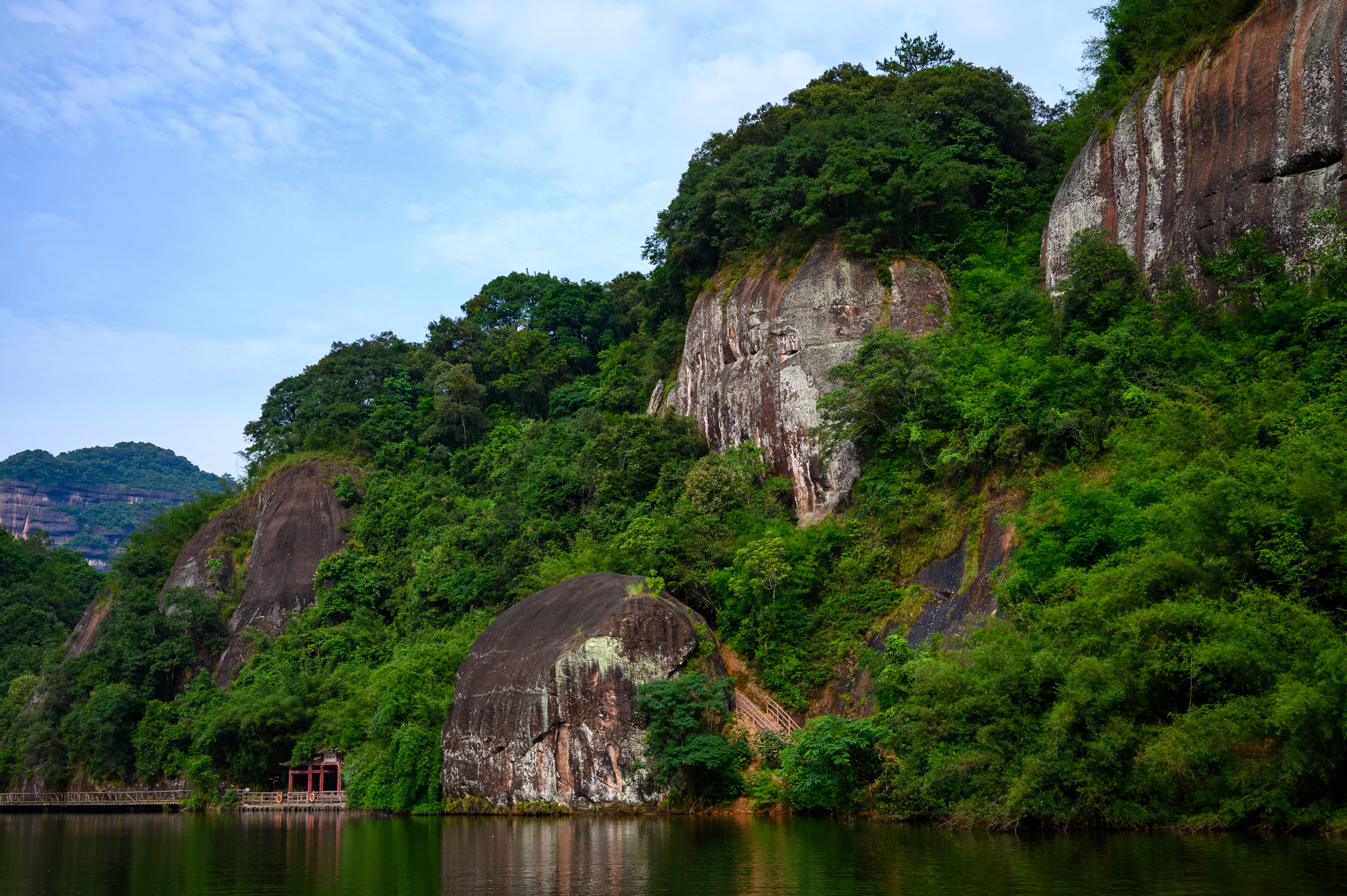
River at Danxia

Mount Danxia is located on the southern side of the Nan Mountains, and it is in the subtropical southern margin, which is the humid subtropical climate.

=== Temperature ===
The annual average temperature of Danxia Mountain is 19.7 °C (67.5 °F), the extreme minimum temperature is −5.4 °C (22.3 °F), the extreme maximum temperature is 40.9 °C (105.6 °F), and the maximum monthly average day is 18.8 °C (65.8 °F). The hottest month is July which has an average temperature of 28.3 °C (82.9 °F), and the coldest month has an average temperature of 9.5 °C (49.1 °F). The average temperature in autumn is higher than spring's.

=== Sunshine ===
The total annual hour of sunshine in Danxia Mountain is 1,721 hours annually, the solar radiation is 107 kcal/cm^{2} (2,900 kJ/sq in), and the average sunshine hours are 4.7 hours per day. More sunshine from July to September, less from February to April.

=== Precipitation ===
The yearly average precipitation is 1,715 mm (67.5 in), and the precipitation period is 172 days annually. The precipitation from March to August is about the 75% of total precipitation in a year, and the most concentrated precipitation is from April to June, which is about 48% precipitation of a year. The maximum annually precipitation in history is 2,185 mm (86.0 in) 1994, and the minimum precipitation is 1,150 mm (45 in) in 1963.

=== Humidity ===
The average absolute humidity of Danxia mount is 19.8mb, and the relative humidity is 81%.

== Natural resources ==
=== Plants ===
The flora of Danxia Mountain is mainly composed of tropical and subtropical flora, but lacks the typical tropical genera, and the amount of moss is relatively large. The landform of DanXia has significant effects on the growth of plants. Since the mountain of DanXia has many deep valleys and grooves, the environment of Danxia is moist, which favors the growth of moss. The special landscape and humid monsoon climate permits the growth of evergreen broadleaf forests, endemic plants, endangered and newly described species such as Danxia viola, Danxia orchid, Danxia firmiana and Danxia chiritopsis.

=== Animals ===
Various wild animals exist in the mount of Danxia, including 88 species of mammals, 288 species of birds, 86 species of reptiles, 37 species (or subspecies) of amphibians, 100 species or subspecies of fish, and 1023 species of insects. Also, there are 59 species of animals in Danxia mountain listed in the "Red List of China Species"; 73 species of animals listed in the IUCN Red List; and 66 species listed in CITES.

== Ancient heritage ==
On the margin of the southwest Danxia basin, a cracked skull was found, and the evidence shows that it is the skull of a Maba man, which is around 30,000 years old.

== Features ==
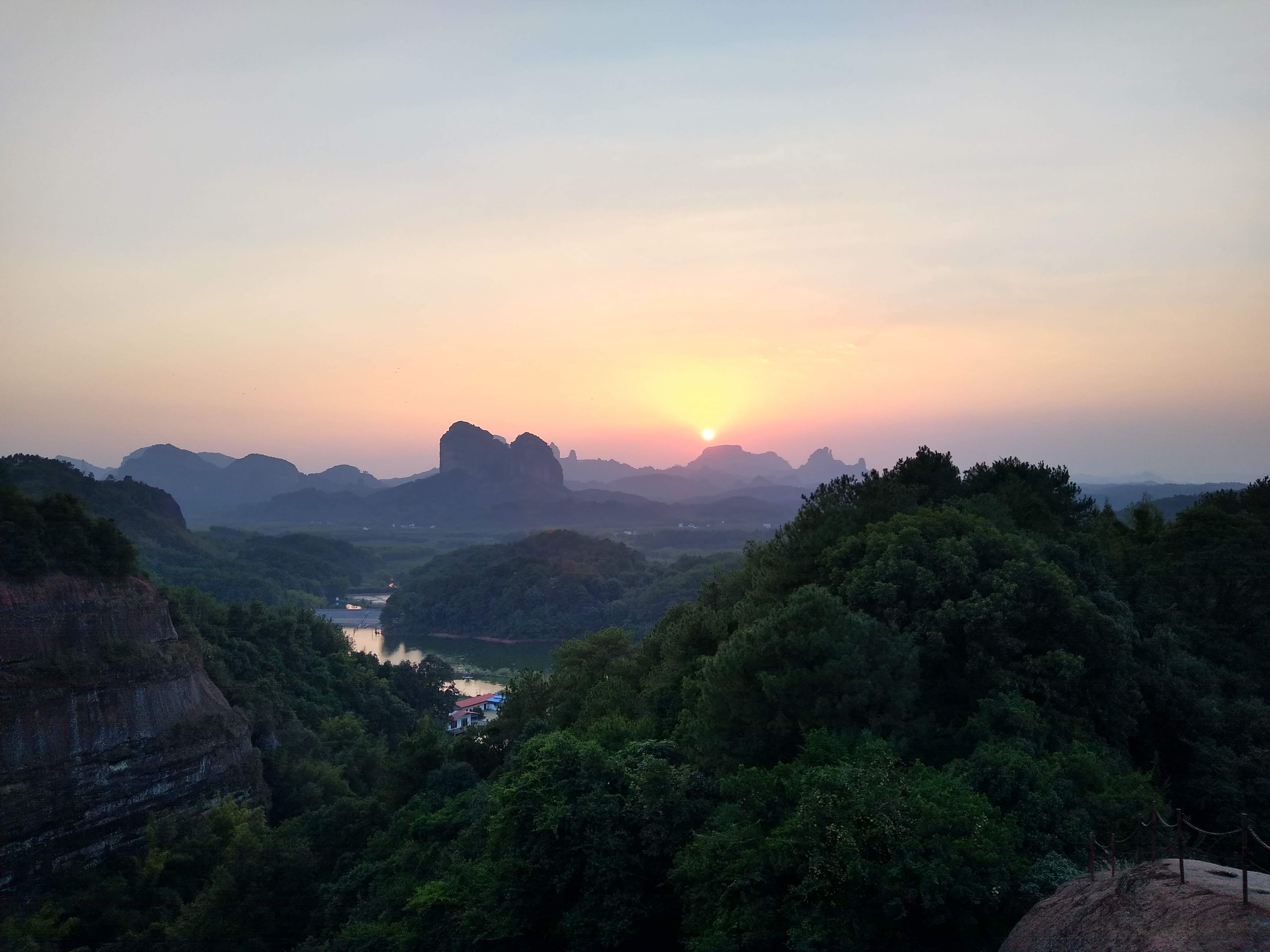
Rocky summits

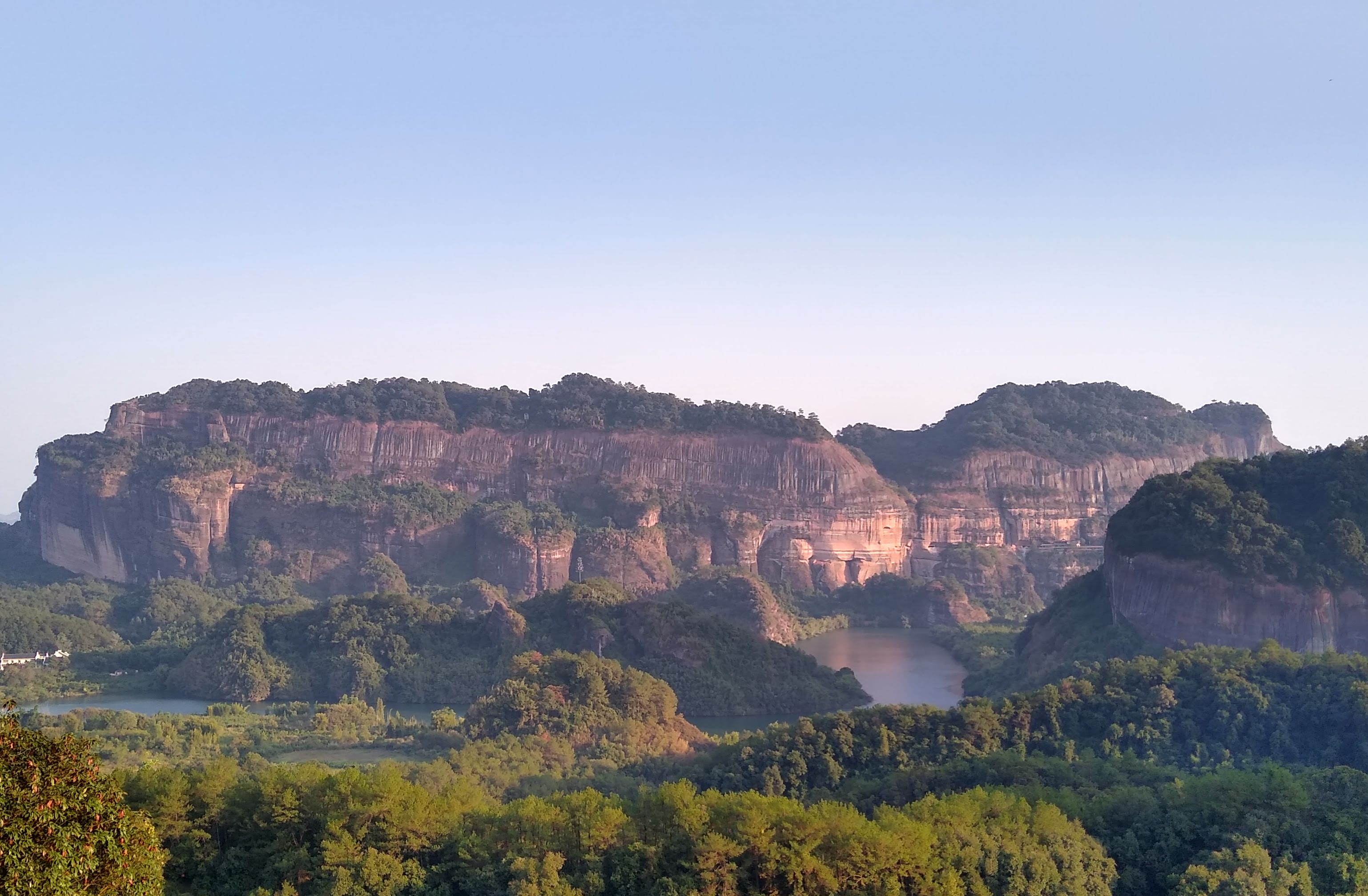
Craggy face

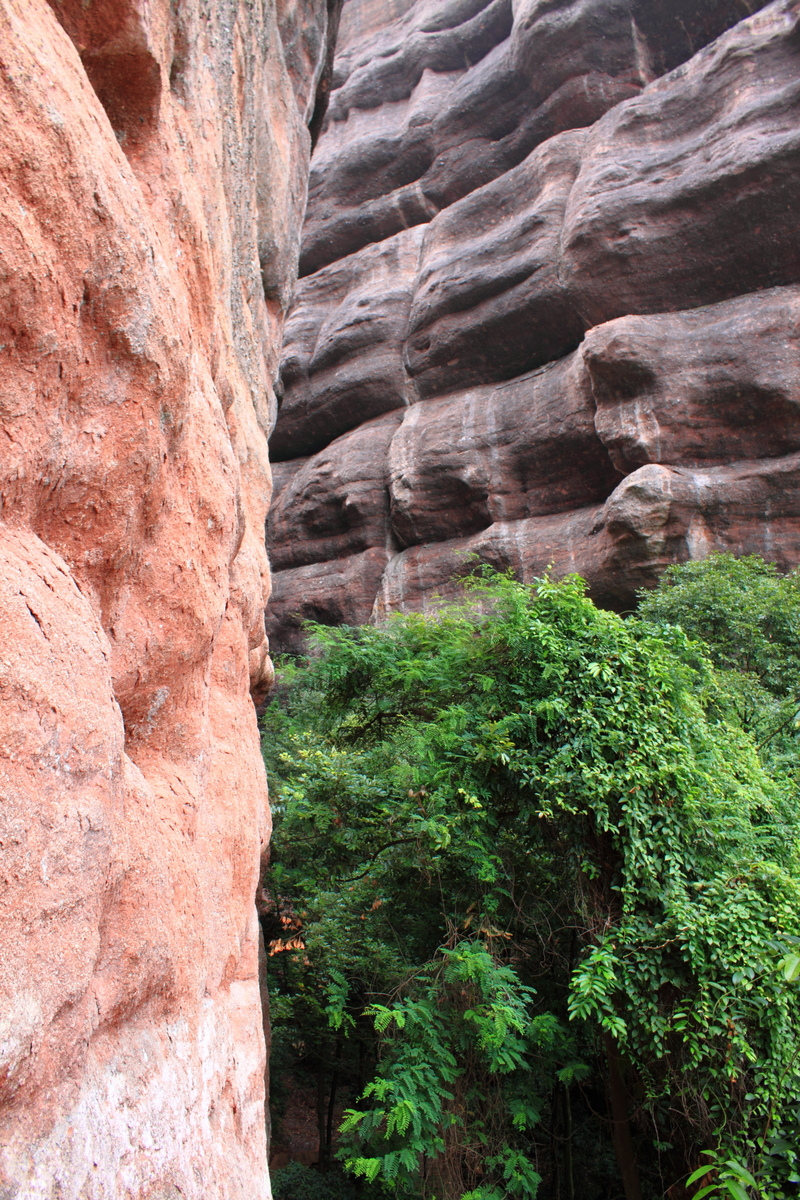
Red cliff

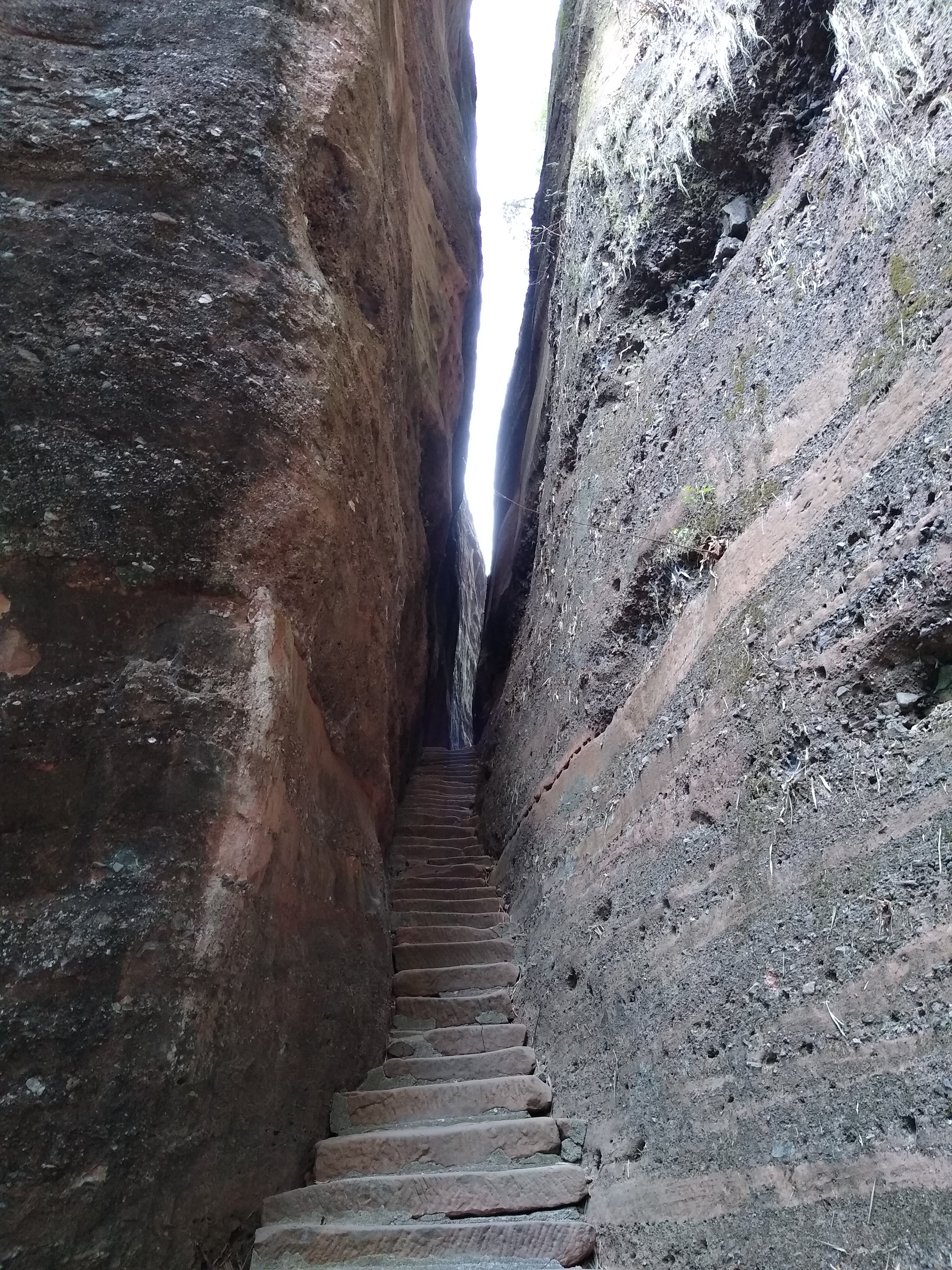
Slot canyon

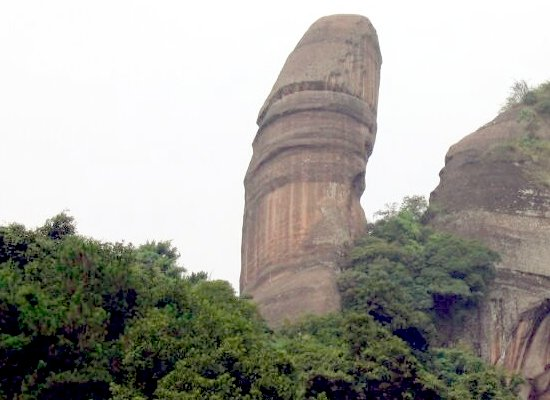
Yang Yuan Stone

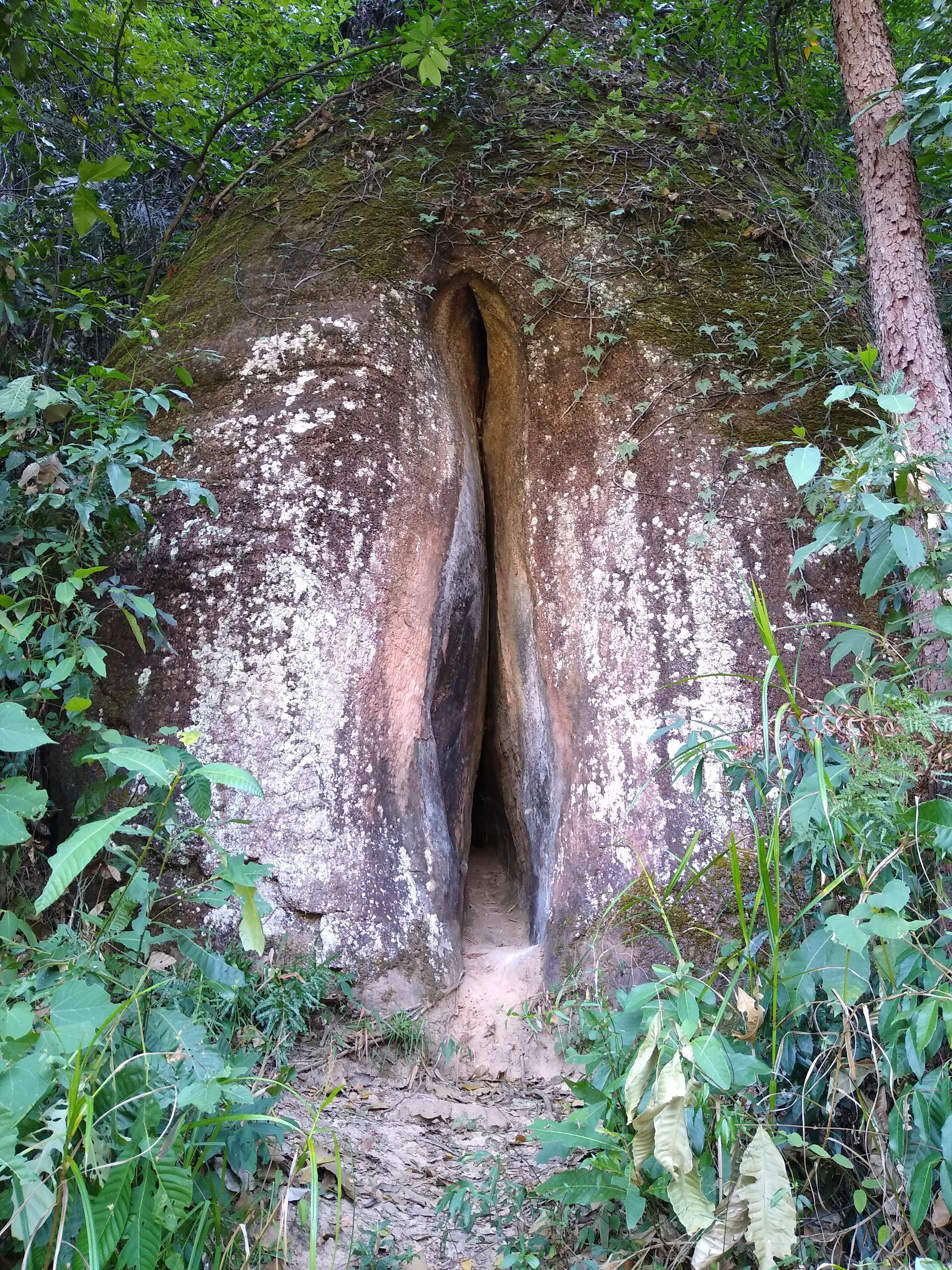
Yin Yuan Stone

== See also ==
- China Danxia
- List of World Heritage Sites in China
- List of mountains named The Sleeping Lady
- Sacred Mountains of China
