= Fangyan, Zhejiang =

Fangyan 方岩镇
- Town
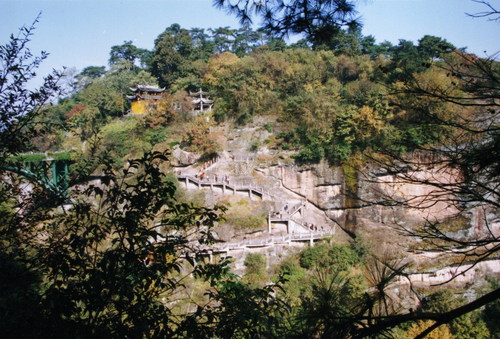
- Mountain in Fangyan

- Location in Zhejiang
- Coordinates: 28°56′53″N 120°11′36″E
- Country: People's Republic of China
- Province: Zhejiang
- Prefecture-level city: Jinhua
- County-level city: Yongkang
- Time zone: UTC+8 (China Standard)

Fangyan (Chinese: 方岩; pinyin: Fāngyán) is a town under the administration of Yongkang, Zhejiang, China. As of 2020, it administers the following two residential neighborhoods and 24 villages:

== Neighborhoods ==
- Fangyan
- Paixi (派溪)

== Villages ==
- Chenglu Village (橙麓村)
- Yanhou Village (岩后村)
- Yanshang Village (岩上村)
- Yanxia Village (岩下村)
- Xi Village (西村)
- Dayuan Village (大园村)
- Houshantou Village (后山头村)
- Changkeng Village (长坑村)
- Guzhufan Village (古竹畈村)
- Xianyan Village (仙岩村)
- Liangtoumen Village (两头门村)
- Paixi Village (派溪村)
- Xianpen Village (先盆村)
- Tongkeng Village (铜坑村)
- Xianghuli Village (象瑚里村)
- Dusong Village (独松村)
- Xiazhai Village (下宅村)
- Wenlou Village (文楼村)
- Shangliye Village (上里叶村)
- Chengliwang Village (橙里王村)
- Jinzhu Village (金竹村)
- Houqian Village (后钱村)
- Xiangmotang Village (象陌堂村)
- Sanchuan Village (三川村)
