= Rucheng County =

Rucheng County 汝城县 Jucheng
- County
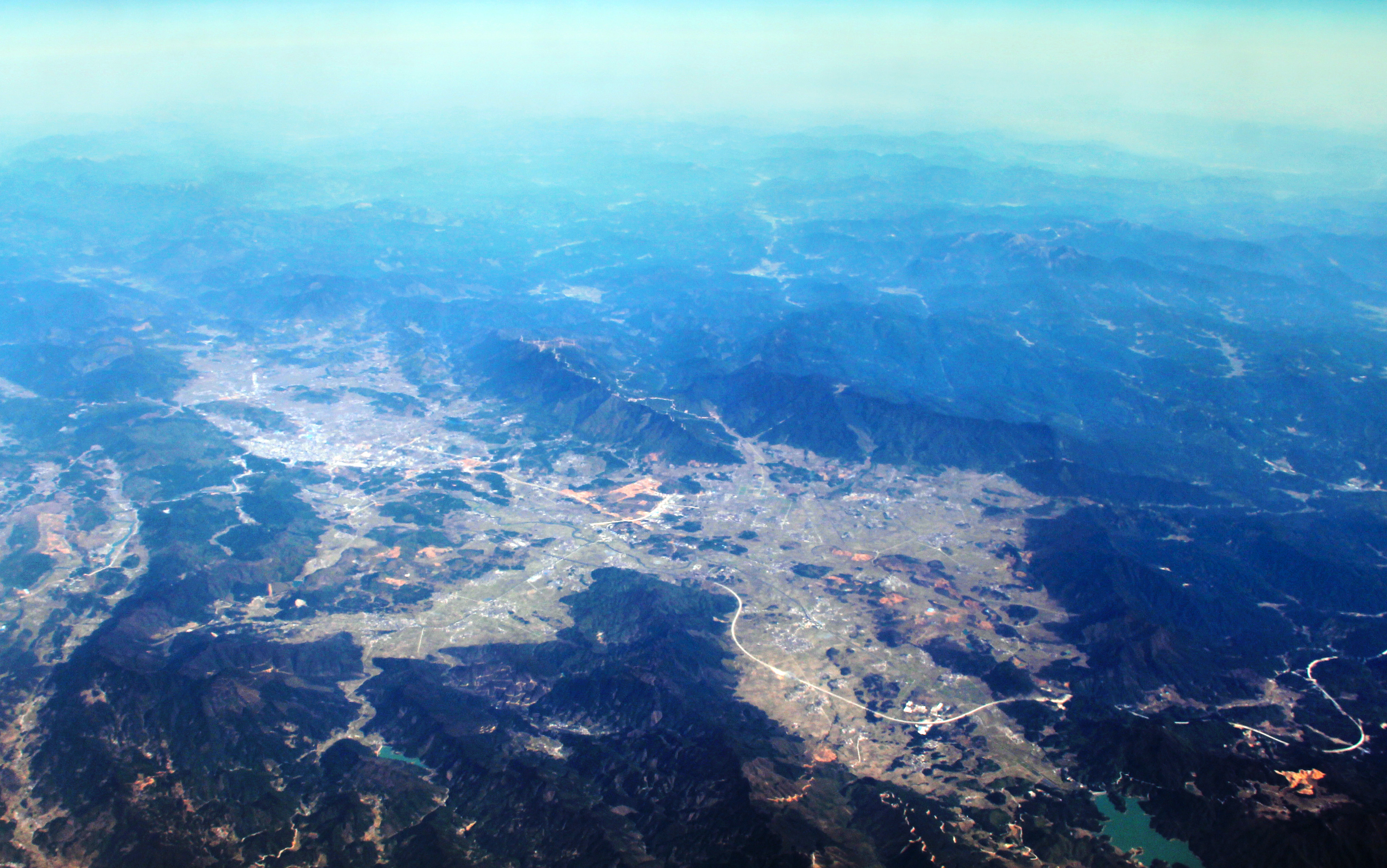
- Rucheng County from above

- Location in Hunan
- Coordinates: 25°33′07″N 113°41′02″E
- Country: People's Republic of China
- Province: Hunan
- Prefecture-level city: Chenzhou
- Time zone: UTC+8 (China Standard)
- Postal code: 4241XX

Rucheng County (simplified Chinese: 汝城县; traditional Chinese: 汝城縣; pinyin: Rǔchéng Xiàn) is a county in Hunan Province, China. It is under the administration of the prefecture-level city of Chenzhou.

Located in the southeastern corner of the province, the county is bordered to the northwest by Yizhang County, to the north by Zixing City, to the northeast by Guidong County, to the east by Chongyi County, to the southeast by Renhua County, and to the southwest by Lechang City. Rucheng County covers an area of 2,400.71 km^{2} (926.92 sq mi), and as of 2015, it had a registered population of 407,200 and a resident population of 344,400. The county has nine towns and five townships under its jurisdiction, and the county seat is Luyang Town (卢阳镇).

Rucheng County is also the home of the Yao people, an ethnic minority accounting for 15.27% of the population. Another local minority is the She people, accounting for 0.24% of the population in the county.

== Administrative divisions ==
9 towns

- Daping (大坪镇)
- Jingpo (井坡镇)
- Luyang (卢阳镇)
- Maqiao (马桥镇)
- Nuanshui (暖水镇)
- Quanshui (泉水镇)
- Reshui (热水镇)
- Sanjiangkou (三江口镇)
- Tuqiao (土桥镇)

3 townships

- Haotou (濠头乡)
- Jiyi (集益乡)
- Nandong (南洞乡)

2 ethnic townships

- Yao Wenming (文明瑶族乡)
- Yao Yanshou (延寿瑶族乡)

== Climate ==
Climate data for Rucheng, elevation 646 m (2,119 ft), (1991–2020 normals, extremes 1981–2010)
Month	Jan	Feb	Mar	Apr	May	Jun	Jul	Aug	Sep	Oct	Nov	Dec	Year
Record high °C (°F)	22.7 (72.9)	26.8 (80.2)	29.2 (84.6)	31.0 (87.8)	32.8 (91.0)	33.8 (92.8)	36.7 (98.1)	37.3 (99.1)	34.7 (94.5)	33.4 (92.1)	29.5 (85.1)	24.2 (75.6)	37.3 (99.1)
Mean daily maximum °C (°F)	11.4 (52.5)	13.7 (56.7)	16.5 (61.7)	21.9 (71.4)	25.7 (78.3)	28.1 (82.6)	30.3 (86.5)	30.2 (86.4)	27.9 (82.2)	24.2 (75.6)	19.3 (66.7)	14.0 (57.2)	21.9 (71.5)
Daily mean °C (°F)	6.7 (44.1)	9.1 (48.4)	12.4 (54.3)	17.6 (63.7)	21.6 (70.9)	24.2 (75.6)	25.7 (78.3)	25.1 (77.2)	22.7 (72.9)	18.5 (65.3)	13.5 (56.3)	8.3 (46.9)	17.1 (62.8)
Mean daily minimum °C (°F)	3.5 (38.3)	5.9 (42.6)	9.4 (48.9)	14.5 (58.1)	18.4 (65.1)	21.5 (70.7)	22.4 (72.3)	21.8 (71.2)	19.2 (66.6)	14.4 (57.9)	9.3 (48.7)	4.3 (39.7)	13.7 (56.7)
Record low °C (°F)	−5.5 (22.1)	−4.5 (23.9)	−3.4 (25.9)	2.2 (36.0)	7.1 (44.8)	11.8 (53.2)	17.7 (63.9)	16.5 (61.7)	10.7 (51.3)	1.9 (35.4)	−2.1 (28.2)	−7.8 (18.0)	−7.8 (18.0)
Average precipitation mm (inches)	74.4 (2.93)	87.0 (3.43)	155.6 (6.13)	165.5 (6.52)	194.8 (7.67)	260.2 (10.24)	171.3 (6.74)	177.7 (7.00)	107.8 (4.24)	61.6 (2.43)	66.1 (2.60)	52.7 (2.07)	1,574.7 (62)
Average precipitation days (≥ 0.1 mm)	13.4	14.0	19.5	17.4	18.5	19.0	15.8	17.2	12.8	7.4	9.3	9.8	174.1
Average snowy days	1.3	0.8	0.1	0	0	0	0	0	0	0	0	0.4	2.6
Average relative humidity (%)	81	82	84	83	82	84	80	82	80	77	77	77	81
Mean monthly sunshine hours	83.1	76.0	71.5	99.6	124.5	134.9	210.9	189.2	163.8	166.3	141.9	126.1	1,587.8
Percentage possible sunshine	25	24	19	26	30	33	50	47	45	47	44	39	36
Source: China Meteorological Administration
