= Luyang, Rucheng =

Town in Rucheng County, Hunan, China

Coordinates: 25°33′28″N 113°40′43″E

Luyang Town (Chinese: 卢阳镇; pinyin: Lúyáng Zhèn) is a town and the county seat in central Rucheng County, Hunan, China. The town was formed through the amalgamation of Fucheng Township (Chinese: 附城乡), Chengjiao Township (Chinese: 城郊乡), and Chengguan Town (Chinese: 城关镇) in 2012. It has an area of 115.59 km^{2} (44.63 sq mi) with a population of 65,400 (as of 2012). Luyang Town is located in the central portion of Rucheng County; it is bordered by Nuanshui Town (Chinese: 暖水镇) and Tuqiao Town (Chinese: 土桥镇) to the north, Jiyi Township (Chinese: 集益乡) to the west, Daping Town (Chinese: 大坪镇) and Quanshui Town (Chinese: 暖水镇) to the south, and Maqiao Town (Chinese: 马桥镇) to the west. The town has 21 villages and 6 communities under its jurisdiction in 2016. Its seat is at Jiulong Avenue (Chinese: 九龙大道).
