= Renhua County =

Renhua 仁化县 Yanfa
- County
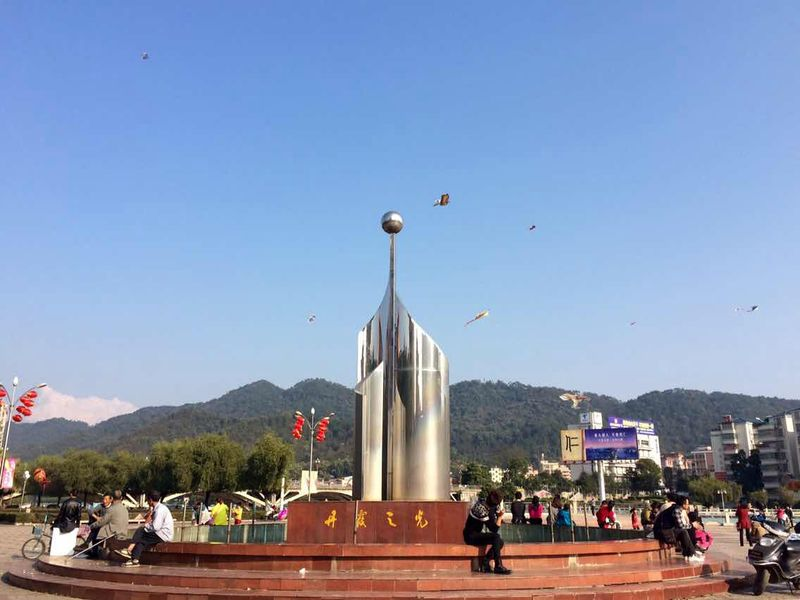
- A public square in Renhua County

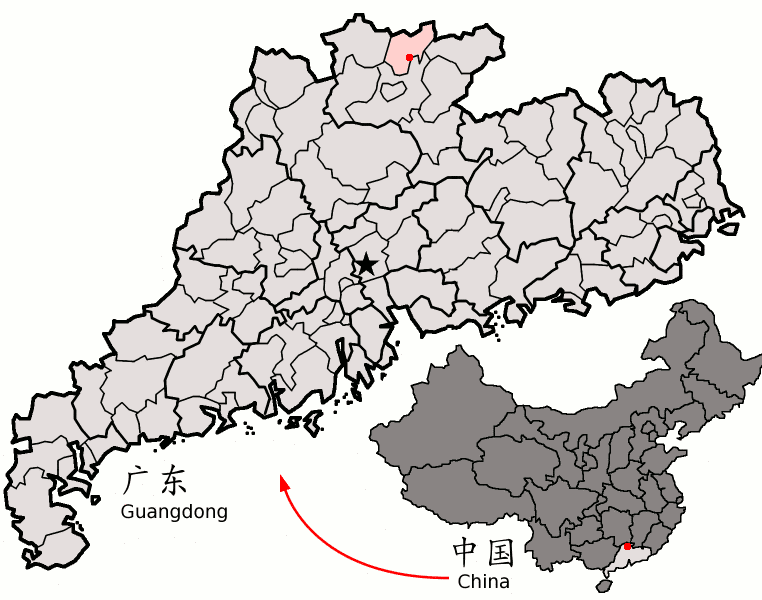
- Location in Guangdong
- Coordinates: 25°05′10″N 113°44′56″E
- Country: People's Republic of China
- Province: Guangdong
- Prefecture-level city: Shaoguan

Area
  - Total: 2,223 km^{2} (858 sq mi)

Population (2010)
  - Total: 200,354
  - Density: 90.13/km^{2} (233.4/sq mi)
- Time zone: UTC+8 (China Standard)

Renhua County (postal: Yanfa; simplified Chinese: 仁化县; traditional Chinese: 仁化縣; pinyin: Rénhuà Xiàn) is a county in the northernmost portion of Guangdong province, in China, bordering Jiangxi to the northeast and Hunan to the northwest. It is under the administration of the prefecture-level city of Shaoguan. Renhua County spans an area of 2,223 square kilometres (858 mi^{2}), and has a population of 200,354 as of the 2010 Chinese Census.

== History ==
During his reign, Nanyue emperor Zhao Tuo oversaw the construction of the city of Guqincheng in present-day Chengkou, Renhua County. Upon the Nanyue capitulation to the Han dynasty, the area of present-day Renhua County was incorporated as Qujiang County (simplified Chinese: 曲江县; traditional Chinese: 曲江縣; pinyin: Qūjiāng Xiàn).

In 479 CE, during the Southern Qi, Renhua County was carved out of Qujiang County. However, during the Liang dynasty, Renhua County was merged back into Qujiang County.

In 688 CE, during the reign of Emperor Ruizong of the Tang dynasty, Renhua County was re-established. Renhua County remained intact until 973 CE, during the reign of Emperor Taizu of the Song dynasty, when it was merged into Lechang County (simplified Chinese: 乐昌县; traditional Chinese: 樂昌縣; pinyin: Lèchāng Xiàn). In 1000 CE, under the reign of Emperor Zhenzong, Renhua County was again re-established.

In 1949, the People's Liberation Army took control of Renhua County as part of Beijiang zone of Guangdong. The Communist government then established the People's Government of Renhua County (Chinese: 仁化县人民政府; pinyin: Rénhuà Xiàn Rénmín Zhèngfǔ).

In 1958, Renhua County was abolished and placed under the direct jurisdiction of Shaoguan. Renhua County was re-established in 1961.

In 1968, the Renhua County people's committee was withdrawn, and a revolutionary committee was established, which belongs to the revolutionary committee of Shaoguan District.

In 1980, People's Government of Renhua County was restored and put under the jurisdiction of Shaoguan District.

In 1983, Shaoguan was upgraded to a prefecture.

== Geography ==
Renhua County is located in the far north of Guangdong province, and borders the provinces of Jiangxi and Hunan. It borders Shixing County and Nanxiong to the east, Qujiang District to the south, Lechang and Zhenjiang District to the west, Rucheng County in Hunan province to the north, and both Chongyi County and Dayu County in Jiangxi province to the northeast.

The county is located along the southern foot of the Nanling Mountains, and has mostly mountainous terrain.

Renhua is located just north of the Tropic of Cancer.

=== Climate ===
It has a subtropical monsoon climate (Köppen classification Cfa). The average annual temperature is 19.9 °C (67.8 °F), the average annual rainfall is 1,660.8 millimetres (65.39 in), and the average frost-free period lasts 308 days.

Climate data for Renhua, elevation 113 m (371 ft), (1991–2020 normals, extremes 1981–2010)
Month	Jan	Feb	Mar	Apr	May	Jun	Jul	Aug	Sep	Oct	Nov	Dec	Year
Record high °C (°F)	27.2 (81.0)	30.9 (87.6)	32.6 (90.7)	34.2 (93.6)	36.1 (97.0)	37.7 (99.9)	40.9 (105.6)	40.6 (105.1)	38.5 (101.3)	36.3 (97.3)	33.0 (91.4)	29.1 (84.4)	40.9 (105.6)
Mean daily maximum °C (°F)	14.7 (58.5)	17.0 (62.6)	19.5 (67.1)	25.1 (77.2)	29.1 (84.4)	31.8 (89.2)	34.1 (93.4)	34.0 (93.2)	31.7 (89.1)	28.0 (82.4)	22.8 (73.0)	17.2 (63.0)	25.4 (77.8)
Daily mean °C (°F)	9.8 (49.6)	12.1 (53.8)	15.1 (59.2)	20.4 (68.7)	24.3 (75.7)	27.0 (80.6)	28.4 (83.1)	28.1 (82.6)	26.0 (78.8)	21.8 (71.2)	16.6 (61.9)	11.3 (52.3)	20.1 (68.1)
Mean daily minimum °C (°F)	6.7 (44.1)	9.0 (48.2)	12.3 (54.1)	17.2 (63.0)	21.1 (70.0)	23.8 (74.8)	24.7 (76.5)	24.4 (75.9)	22.2 (72.0)	17.6 (63.7)	12.6 (54.7)	7.5 (45.5)	16.6 (61.9)
Record low °C (°F)	−2.8 (27.0)	−2.3 (27.9)	0.4 (32.7)	5.1 (41.2)	12.3 (54.1)	15.3 (59.5)	20.6 (69.1)	20.9 (69.6)	14.5 (58.1)	5.5 (41.9)	0.6 (33.1)	−4.8 (23.4)	−4.8 (23.4)
Average precipitation mm (inches)	83.0 (3.27)	99.7 (3.93)	188.6 (7.43)	199.6 (7.86)	283.9 (11.18)	251.7 (9.91)	161.4 (6.35)	163.1 (6.42)	96.4 (3.80)	56.0 (2.20)	62.5 (2.46)	55.6 (2.19)	1,701.5 (67)
Average precipitation days (≥ 0.1 mm)	13.5	13.9	19.5	18.2	19.1	18.8	15.2	15.1	11.8	6.3	8.3	8.8	168.5
Average snowy days	0.6	0.2	0	0	0	0	0	0	0	0	0	0.3	1.1
Average relative humidity (%)	80	81	85	84	83	83	79	80	79	76	77	77	80
Mean monthly sunshine hours	93.3	81.1	69.9	95.1	127.0	149.0	222.8	211.8	184.5	181.7	149.8	136.7	1,702.7
Percentage possible sunshine	28	25	19	25	31	36	53	53	50	51	46	42	38
Source: China Meteorological Administration

== Administrative divisions ==
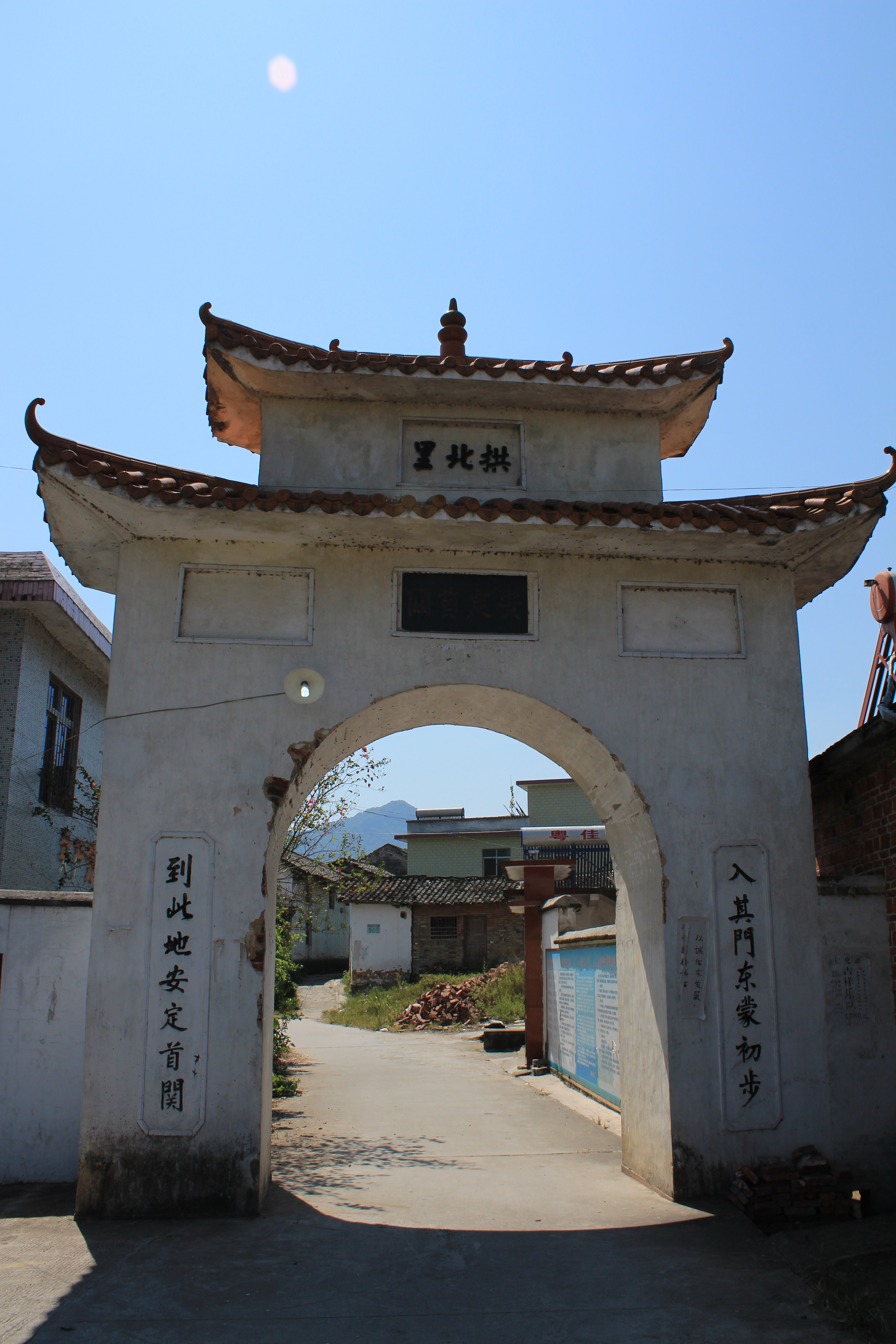
A paifang in Renhua County

Renhua County administers 1 subdistrict and 10 towns. These township-level divisions then, in turn, administer 109 village-level divisions.

The county's sole subdistrict is Danxia Subdistrict, which houses the county government.

The county administers the towns of Wenshao, Fuxi, Changjiang, Chengkou, Hongshan, Shitang, Dongtang, Daqiao, Zhoutian, and Huangkeng.

== Demographics ==
As of the 2010 Chinese Census, Renhua County has a population of 200,354, up from the 163,213 recorded in the 2000 Chinese Census. A 2011 estimate put Renhua County's population at 201,700 people, and a 2008 report stated Renhua County had 229,861 hukou holders. In 1996, Renhua County's population was estimated at 180,000.

=== Languages ===
The most commonly spoken languages in Renhua County are Cantonese, Mandarin, and Hakka. Some of towns speaking Shaozhou Tuhua (Sat Na Wa).

== Tourism ==
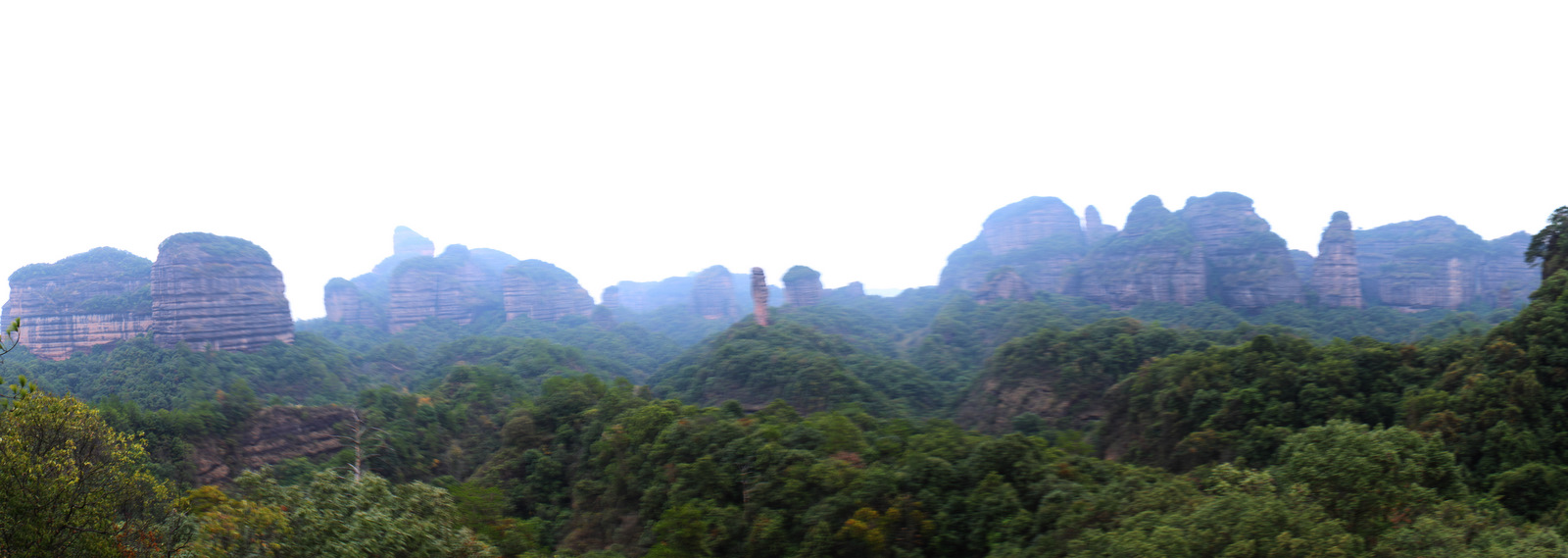
Danxia landform in Renhua County

Notable natural features in Renhua County include Mount Danxia (丹霞山), and Mount Wanshi Grassland (万时山大草原), one of the rare grasslands in Guangdong province. Historical attractions include Shuangfeng Fort (双峰寨), Guqincheng in the town of Chengkou (城口古秦城), Yunlong Pagoda (云龙寺塔), and Sixi Pagoda (澌溪寺塔).

=== Mount Danxia ===
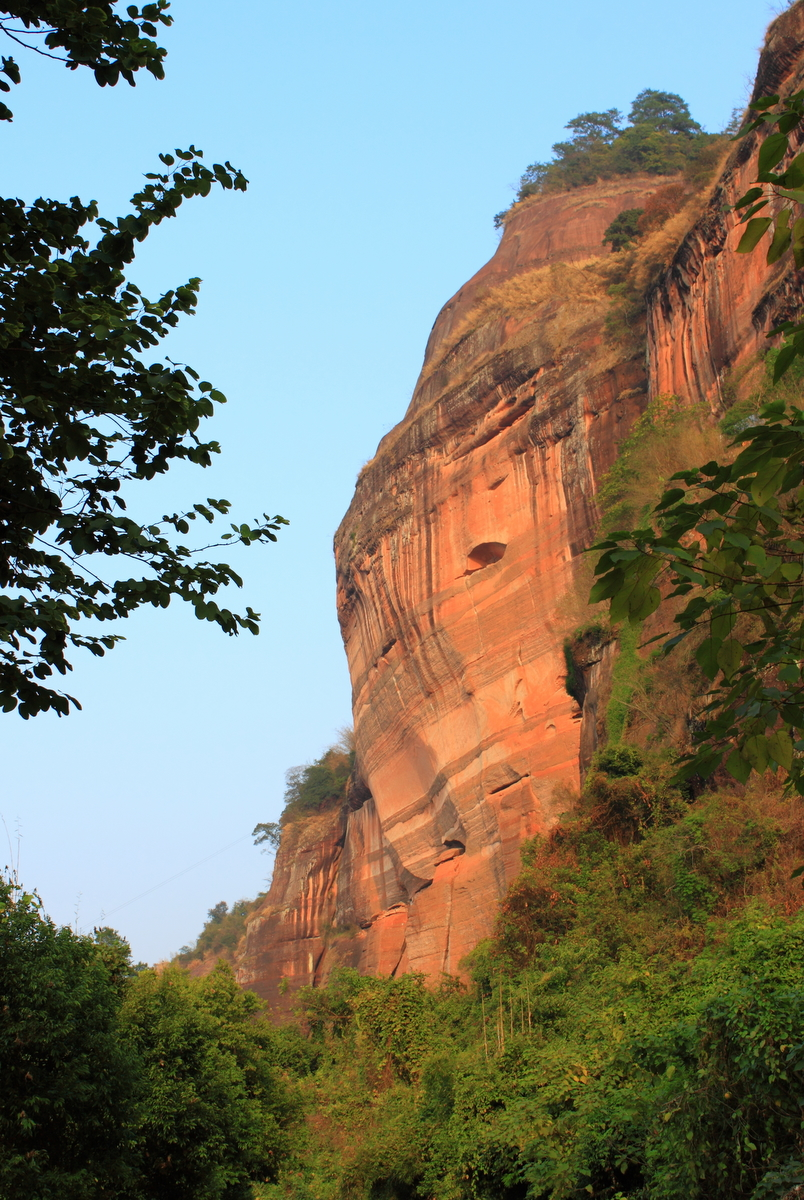
Mount Danxia

Mount Danxia is a Danxia landform designated as a World Heritage Site, a National Scenic Area, a National Nature Reserve, a National Geopark, and a National 5A Tourist Attraction. Nicknamed "The Red Stone Park of China", it is the largest attraction by area in Guangdong province, covering 292 square kilometres (113 mi^{2}). It is formed by red lake and river gravel rock from 70 thousand years. In addition, it has the shape most abundant among Danxia land-form, especially the male and female stone. It is mainly divided into the Danxia scenic area, Shao Shi Xian traveled scenic, attractions, scenic spots and scenic Jinjiang gallery. In 1988, Mount Danxia was listed as a National Park of China, a National Nature Reserve, a National Geopark, and a National 5A Tourist Attraction. In 2004, Danxia Mountain was listed as a UNESCO Global Geopark. Mount Danxia has a lot of resources including 1,916 kind of plants, 88 mammals, 288 birds, 86 reptiles, 37 amphibians, 100 fishes and 1,023 insects.

=== Mount Wanshi Grassland ===
The highest point in Renhua County is Mount Wanshi, which serves as the tripoint between Renhua County, Rucheng County in Hunan, and Chongyi County in Jiangxi. The mountain is also known as Mount Sishui (Chinese: 汜水山; pinyin: Sìshuǐ Shān) in Hunan, and Mount Fanzi (Chinese: 范子山; pinyin: Fànzi Shān) in Jiangxi. Mount Wanshi reaches 1,559.38 metres (5,116.1 ft) in elevation, and is located 65 kilometres (40 mi) from Mount Danxia. Like Mount Danxia, Mount Wanshi is a Danxia landform. Mount Wanshi is the source of the Jin River.

Mount Wanshi was the site of battles during the Chinese Civil War, and part of the Long March passed through Mount Wanshi.

The annual average temperature of this special area is 17.8 °C (64.0 °F), the annual average rainfall is 1,600 millimetres (63 in), and there are more than 100 types of animals and more than 30 types of plants. Mount Wanshi is a popular regional destination for ecotourism.

=== Shuangfeng Fort ===
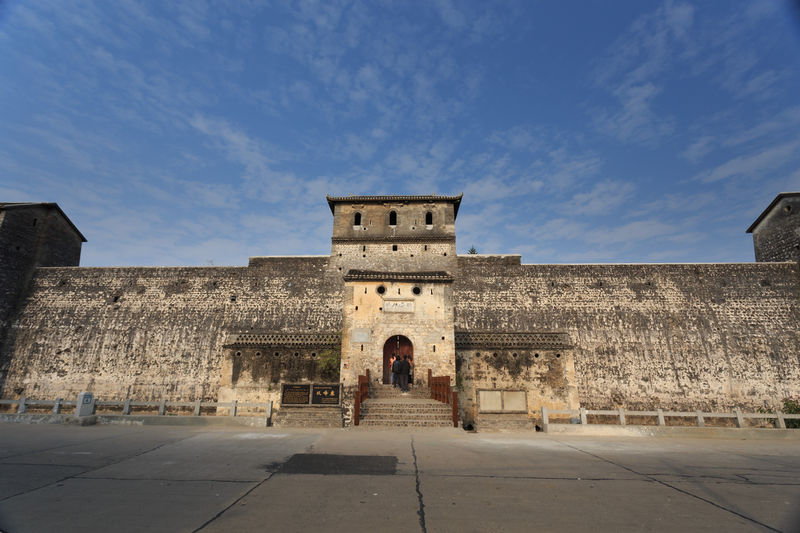
Shuang Feng Fort

Built in 1915, Shuangfeng Fort is located in the town of Shitang, 19 km (12 mi) to the west of Renhua County's center. It covers 11.3 km^{2} (4.4 sq mi). Shuangfeng Fort served as a defensive fort, made from limestone and ancient black brick which made it very strong. The fort is surrounded by a 4.878 square kilometres (1.883 mi^{2}) moat. In 1928, forces from the Red Army and the Kuomintang fought at Shuangfeng Fort. In 2006, Shuangfeng Fort was approved by the State Council on the sixth batch of national key cultural relic unit under state protection list.

=== Chengkou Guqincheng ===
Located in Chengkou, Guqincheng is 38 km (24 mi) to the north of the county center. It controlled the route from Guangdong Province to Hunan Province as it east village was fixed up the city group, south * en streams (where the west water), west street, north to SanJiaoPing to old salt. With a height of 6.2 metres (6.8 yd), and a width of 4.5 metres (4.9 yd), Chengkou Guqincheng was listed as a county-level cultural relic protection unit in 1982. It was built under the administration of Nanyue emperor Zhao Tuo, but was rebuilt in Qing dynasty after being destroyed.

=== Yunlong Pagoda ===
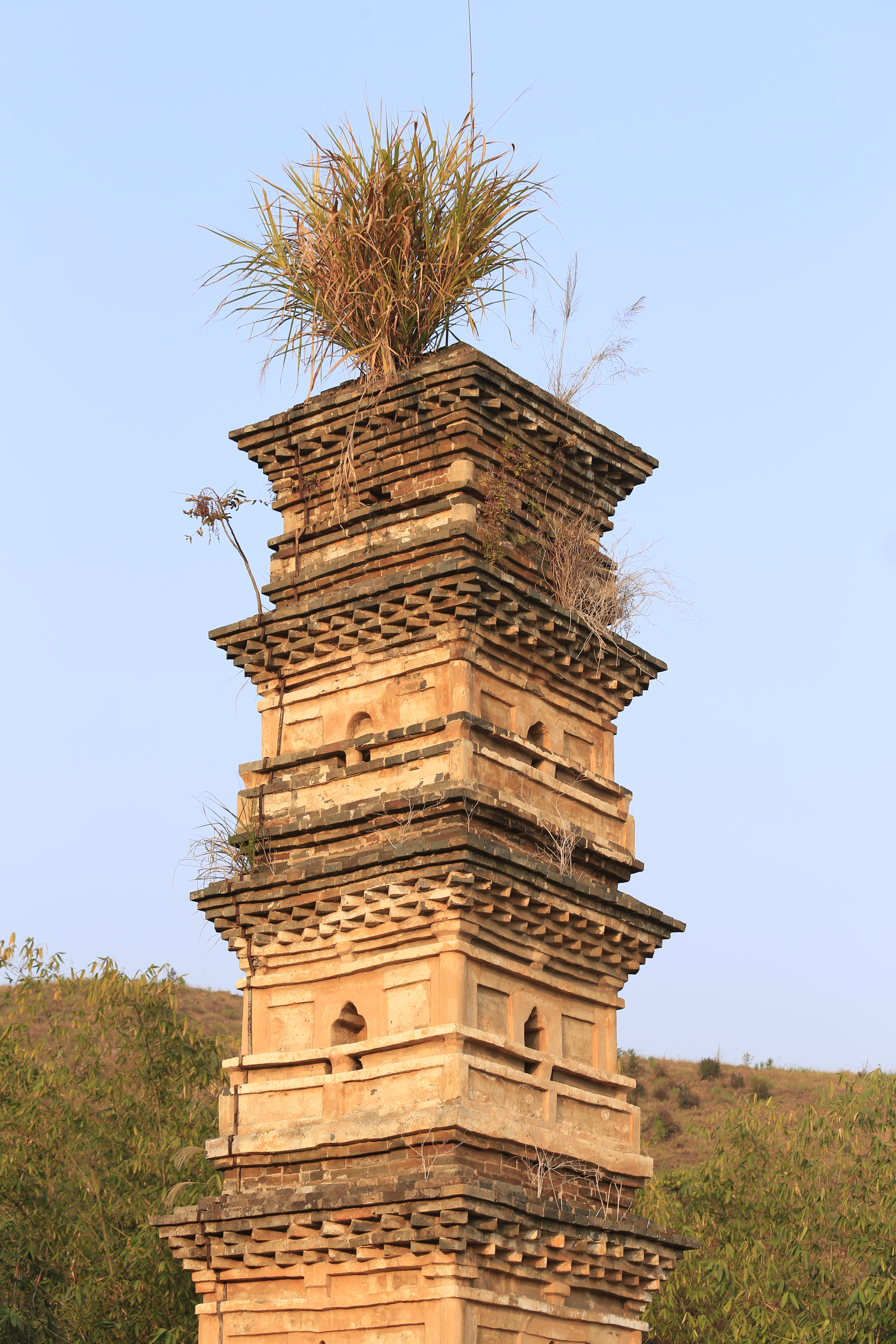
Yunlong Temple Tower

Located in Dongtang, Yunlong Pagoda is a pagoda built between 894 CE and 901 CE, during the Tang dynasty. The pagoda was originally called Xishan Pagoda (Chinese: 西山寺塔; pinyin: Xīshān Sìtǎ), but was renamed in the Qing dynasty. Yunlong Pagoda has a rectangular shape, and is five stories in height, with the top reaching 10.34 metres (11.31 yd) high. The length of the first floor is 2 metres (2.2 yd), although higher floors have a smaller area. The pagoda's architecture is distinct to the Tang dynasty.

In January 1988, the State Council announced it as a national key cultural relics protection unit.

=== Sixi Pagoda ===
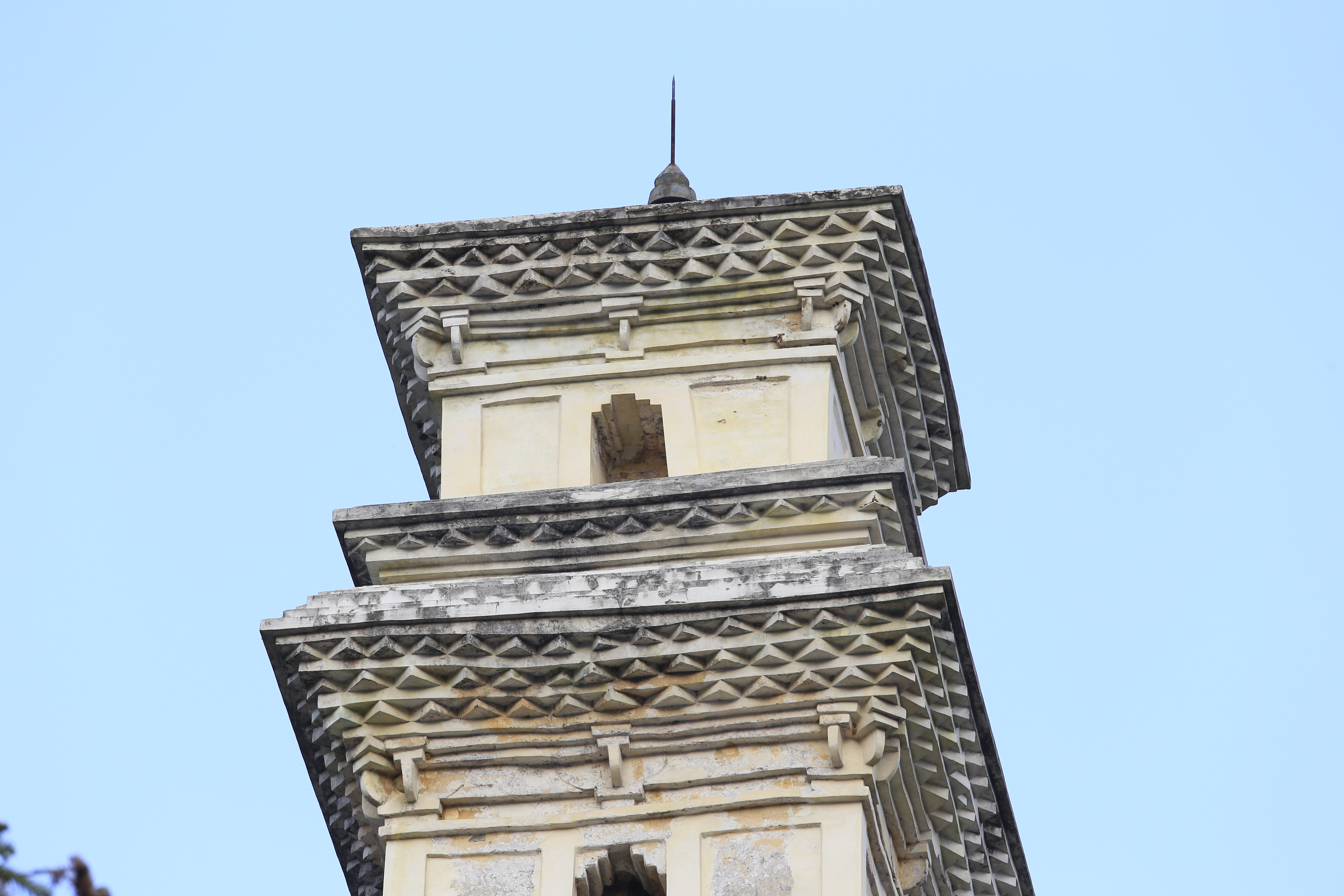
Sixi Temple Tower

Also located in Dongtang, Sixi Pagoda faces Yunlong Pagoda across Sixi Mountain. It was built in 1075 and listed as the second paper unit of Guangdong Province. The tower has a height of 23.14 metres (25.31 yd) and made of brick. It not only has an architectural feature of Tang Dynasty, but with the style of Song dynasty. It is a loft-style tower which made of examinations in the imitation wood for external, the door with arch plane, shape likes flat square, round flat seat Chuanxin wall internal, with blue bricks' Chuanxin ladder, can connect to the top floor.

== Cuisine ==
Cuisine in Renhua County includes Shitang rice wine, Field-snail casserole, Hongshan white-hair tea, Danxia pickled radish, Huangkeng citrus Gonggan, and Xiafu pomelo.

=== Shitang rice wine ===
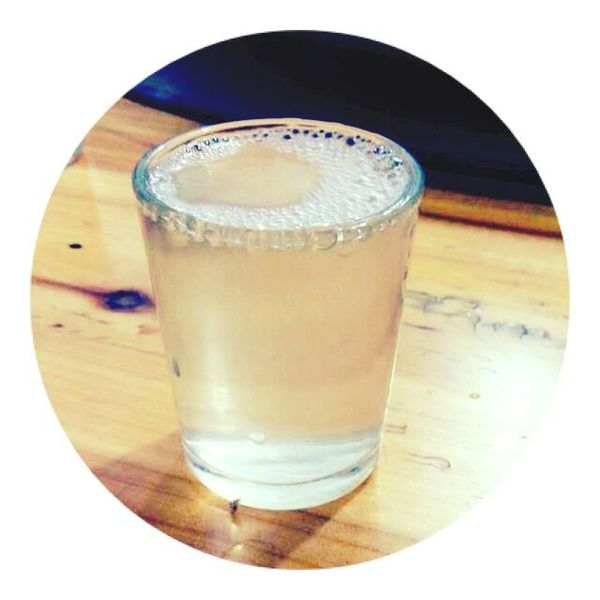
Shitang Rice Wine

Shitang rice wine has a history of more than 300 years. The unique taste is attributed to the requirement that it must be made with local water. The foam from Shitang Rice Wine often accumulates in cups, giving it the nickname "stacking flowers".

=== Field-snail casserole ===
Field-snail casserole is one of the local feather foodies. The dish is made with locally planted betel nut palm. It is locally used to dispel the cold.

=== Hongshan white-hair tea ===
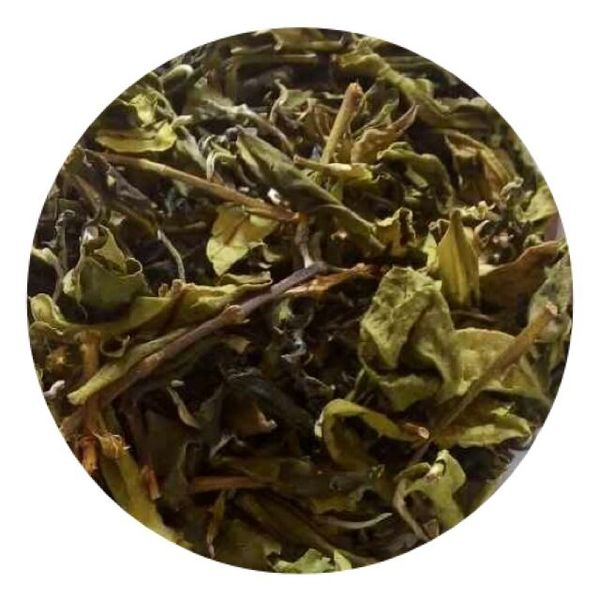
Hongshan White-hair Tea

Hongshan white-hair tea was used as a royal tribute during the Qing dynasty. The tea is a kind of green tea which has the leaves' white "hair" in it. The tea tastes sweet and delicate, and is the first of three white-hair tea in China.

=== Danxia pickled radish ===
Danxia Pickled Radish is made a by local secret recipe, and is round, crispy, and acidic.

=== Huangkeng citrus Gonggan ===
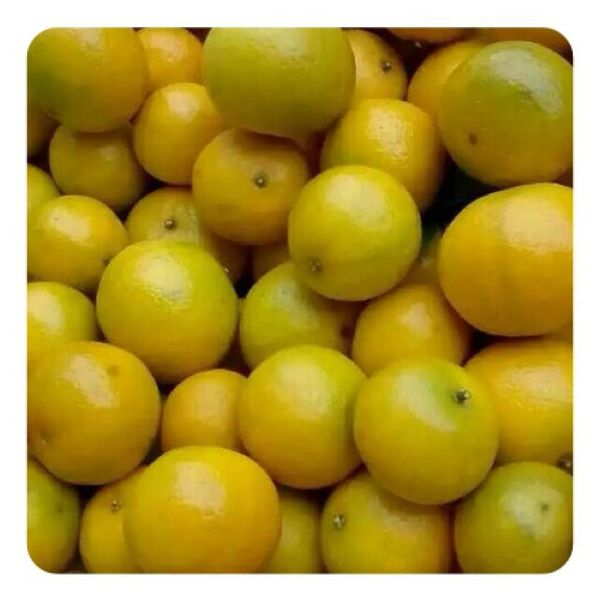
Huangkeng Citrus Gonggan

Huangkeng citrus Gonggang is grown in Huangkeng, which neighbors Mount Danxia. Huangkeng has a special climate and soil condition which is suitable for Gonggan growing. Huangkeng citrus Gonggang is characterized by its uniquely thin skin, seedless-ness, and sweet flesh.

=== Xiafu Pomelo ===
Xiafu pomelo is sweet and fragrant. With its climate and soil conditions the shape, flesh, and taste of Xiafu pomelo is the similar to pomelo from Shatian Guangxi.

== See also ==
- Mount Danxia
- Nanyue
- Shaoguan
