= Daping =

Daping may refer to:

- Daping, Pingyang, Zhejiang Province, China
- Daping, Fujian Province, China
- Daping, Hunan Province, China
- Daping, Qingyuan, Guangdong Province, China
- Daping, Mei County, Guangdong Province, China
- Daping, Xingning, Guangdong Province, China
- Daping, Puning, Guangdong Province, China
- Daping Station, Chongqing Municipality, China
