= Ching Chiang-class patrol ship =

Corvette class of the Republic of China Navy

Class overview
- Builders: CSBC Corporation, Taiwan
- Operators: Republic of China Navy
- Succeeded by: Tuo Chiang-class corvette
- Built: 1994–2000
- In commission: 1994–present
- Planned: 12
- Completed: 12
- Active: 1
- Retired: 11

General characteristics
- Type: Patrol ship/corvette
- Displacement: 580 tons
- Length: 61.4 m (201 ft 5 in)
- Beam: 9.5 m (31 ft 2 in)
- Draft: 2.9 m (9 ft 6 in)
- Speed: 25 knots (46 km/h; 29 mph)
- Complement: 50

The Ching Chiang class (Chinese: 錦江) is a class of patrol ships/corvettes built by CSBC for the Republic of China Navy. Named after the Jinjiang river in Guangdong, China, this class of vessels were initially equipped with the HF-1 anti-ship missile, one 40 mm anti-aircraft gun, and one 20 mm gun.

Beginning in 2012 the ROCN began upgrading the Ching Chiang class to counter the increasing capabilities of the PRC. The primary improvements were the fitting of four HF-3 supersonic anti-ship missile launchers and the fitting of the OTO Melara 76 mm naval gun in place of the 40 mm gun on certain vessels.

== Operational history ==
In 2020 one of the Ching Chiang-class patrol ships outfitted with special electronic warfare equipment was used to interfere with the signals collection of Chinese spy ships during the annual Han Kuang Exercise.

The lead ship of the class, Ching Chiang (PGG-603), was retired on 1 February 2021.

In 2024 a Ching Chiang-class patrol ship got stranded on a sandbar off Zuoying Naval Base but was able to dislodge itself a few hours later.

=== HF-3 misfire ===
In 2016 Jin Chiang (PGG-610) accidentally launched an HF-3 missile during a dockside drill. While the warhead of the missile was unarmed the missile hit a fishing vessel and did considerable damage. The ship's captain was killed and three crew members were injured.

== Gallery ==
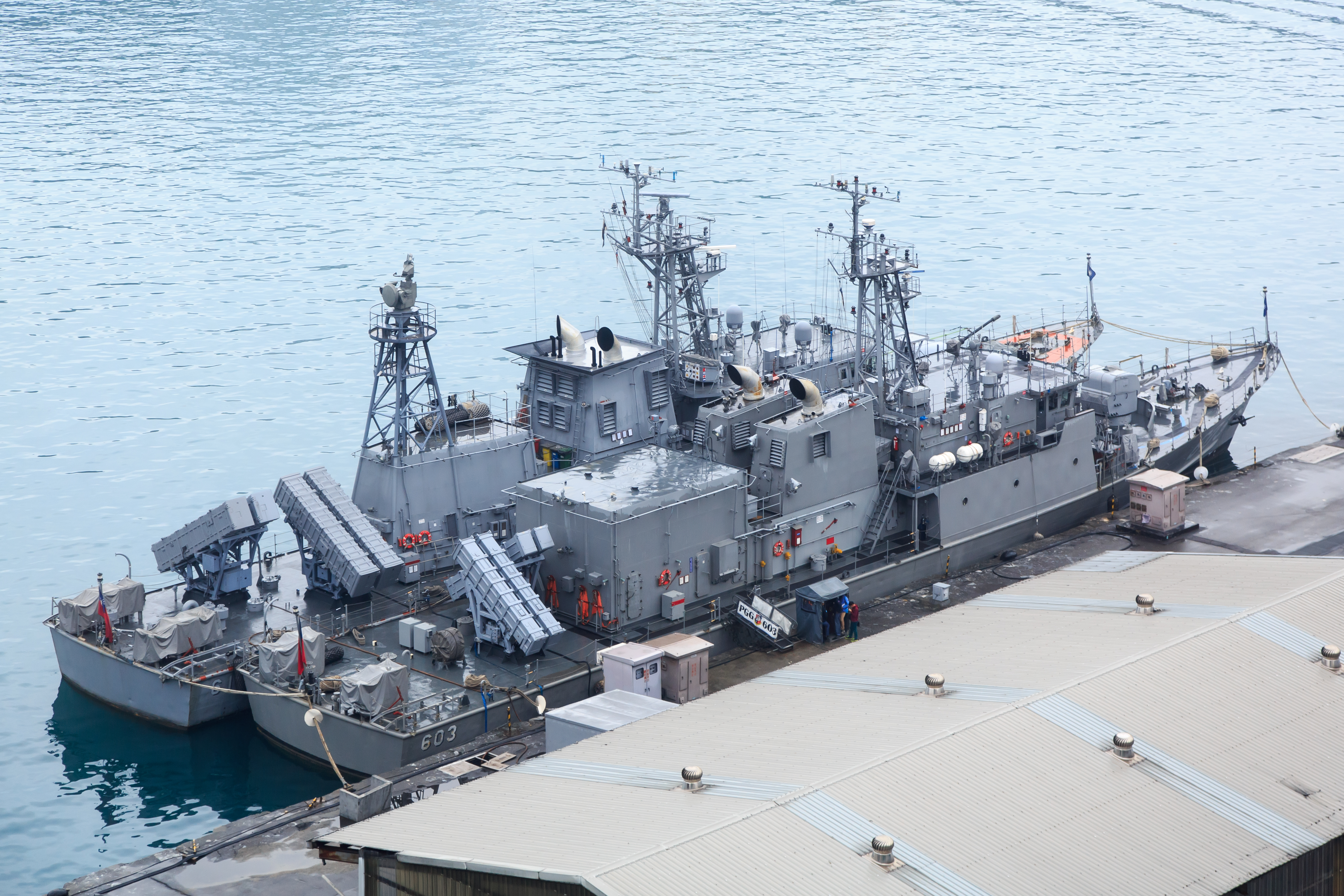
Two vessels of the Ching Chiang class at Keelung

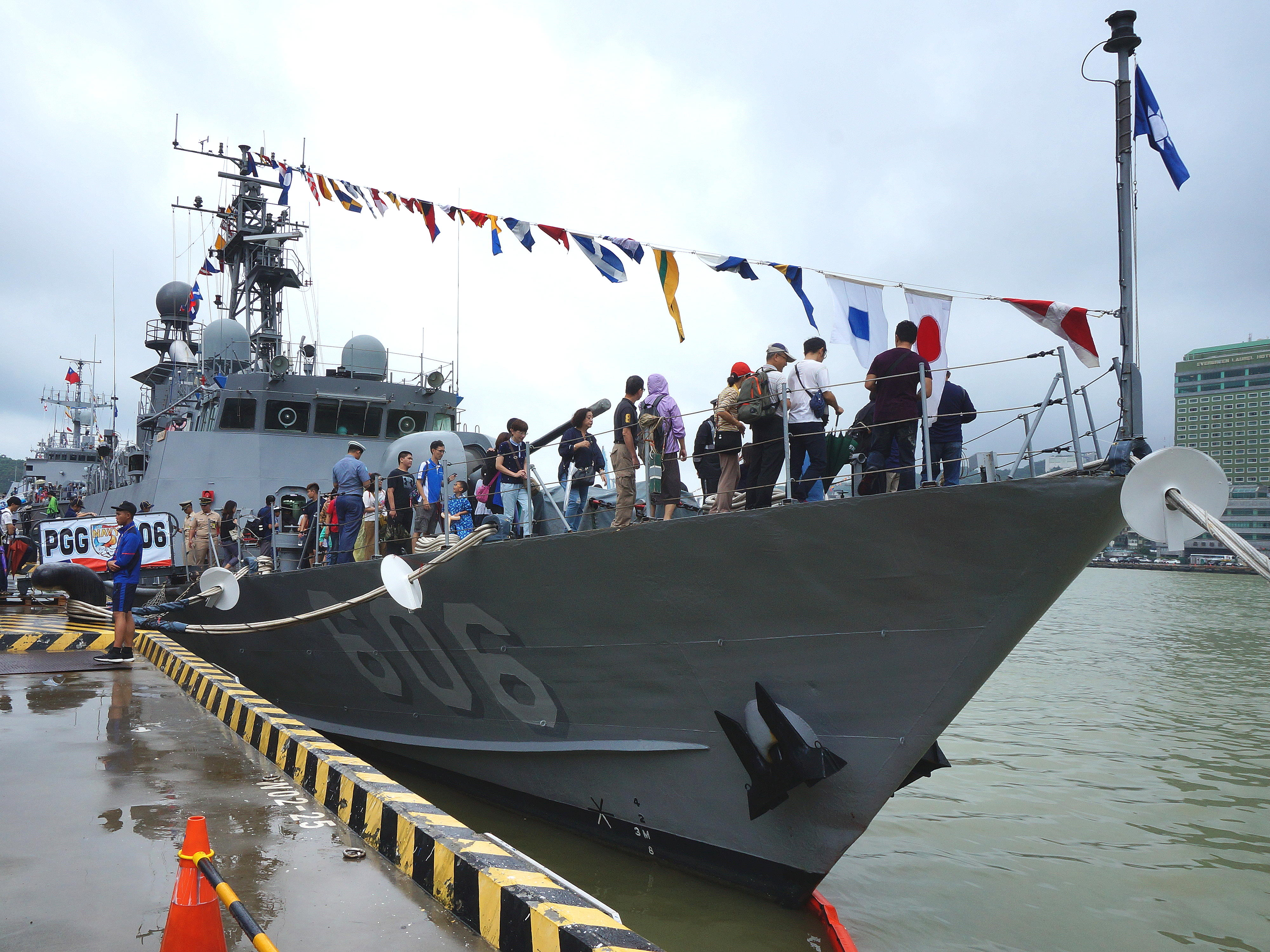
ROCN PGG-606 and visitors queue in Keelung

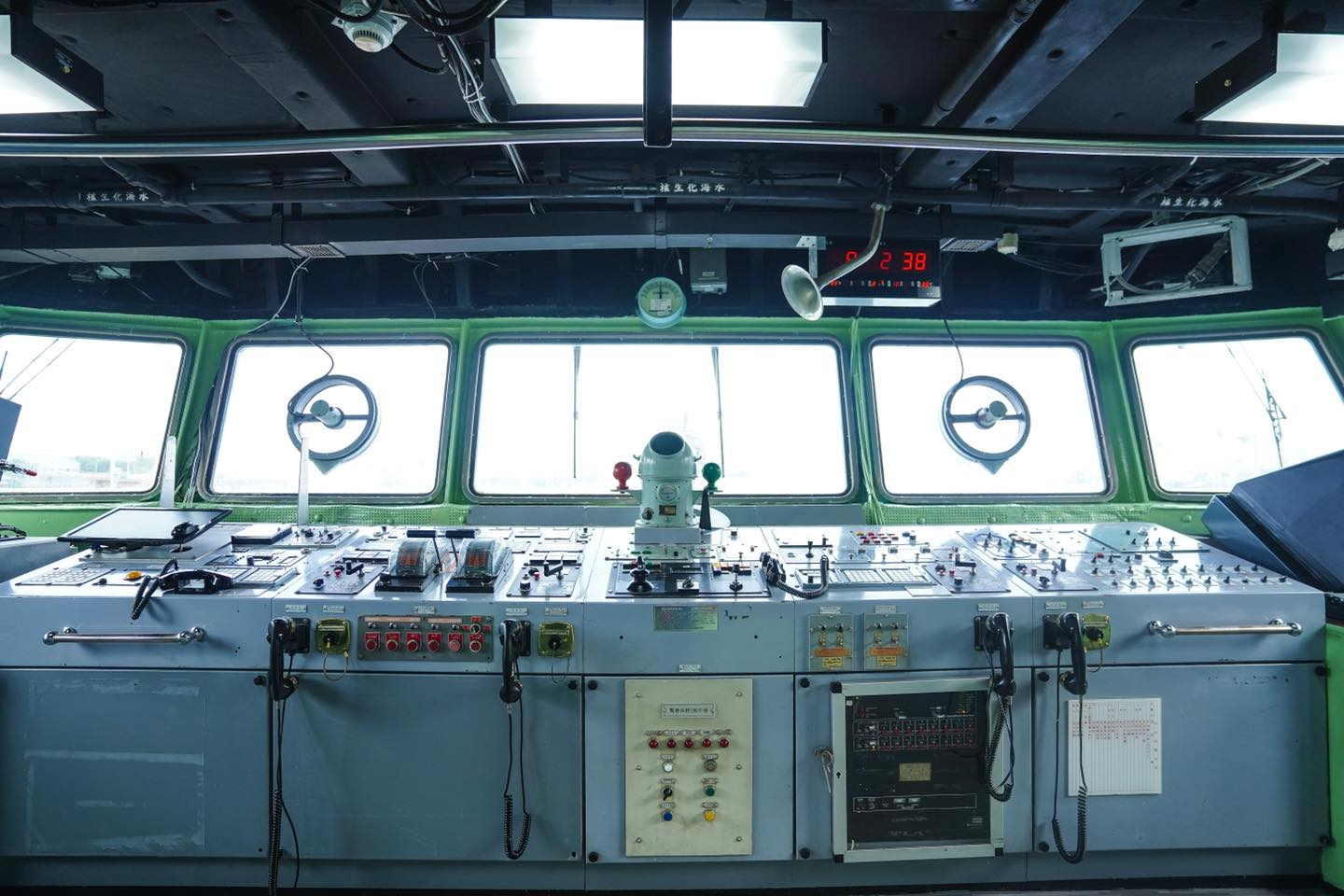
Bridge

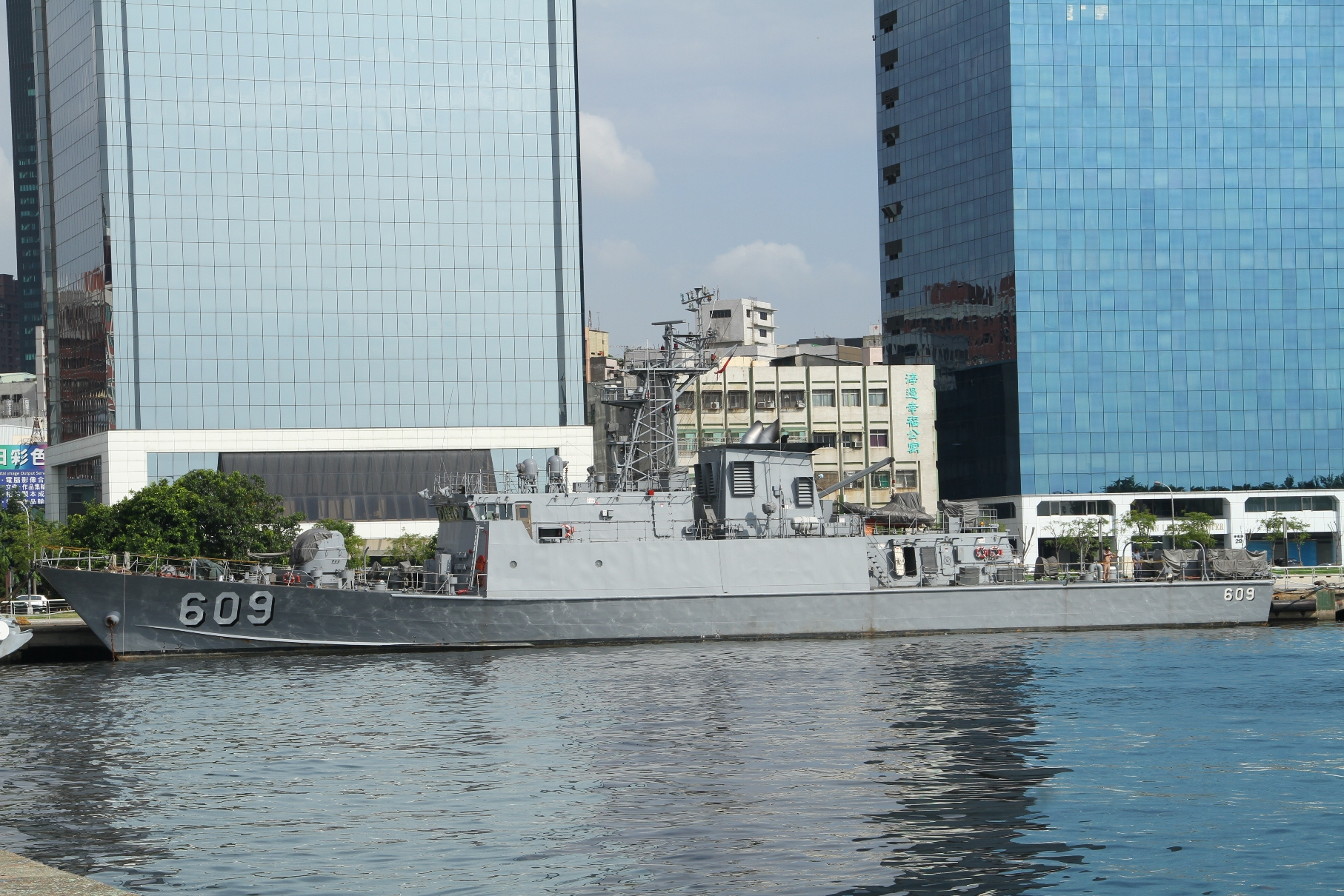
PGG-609

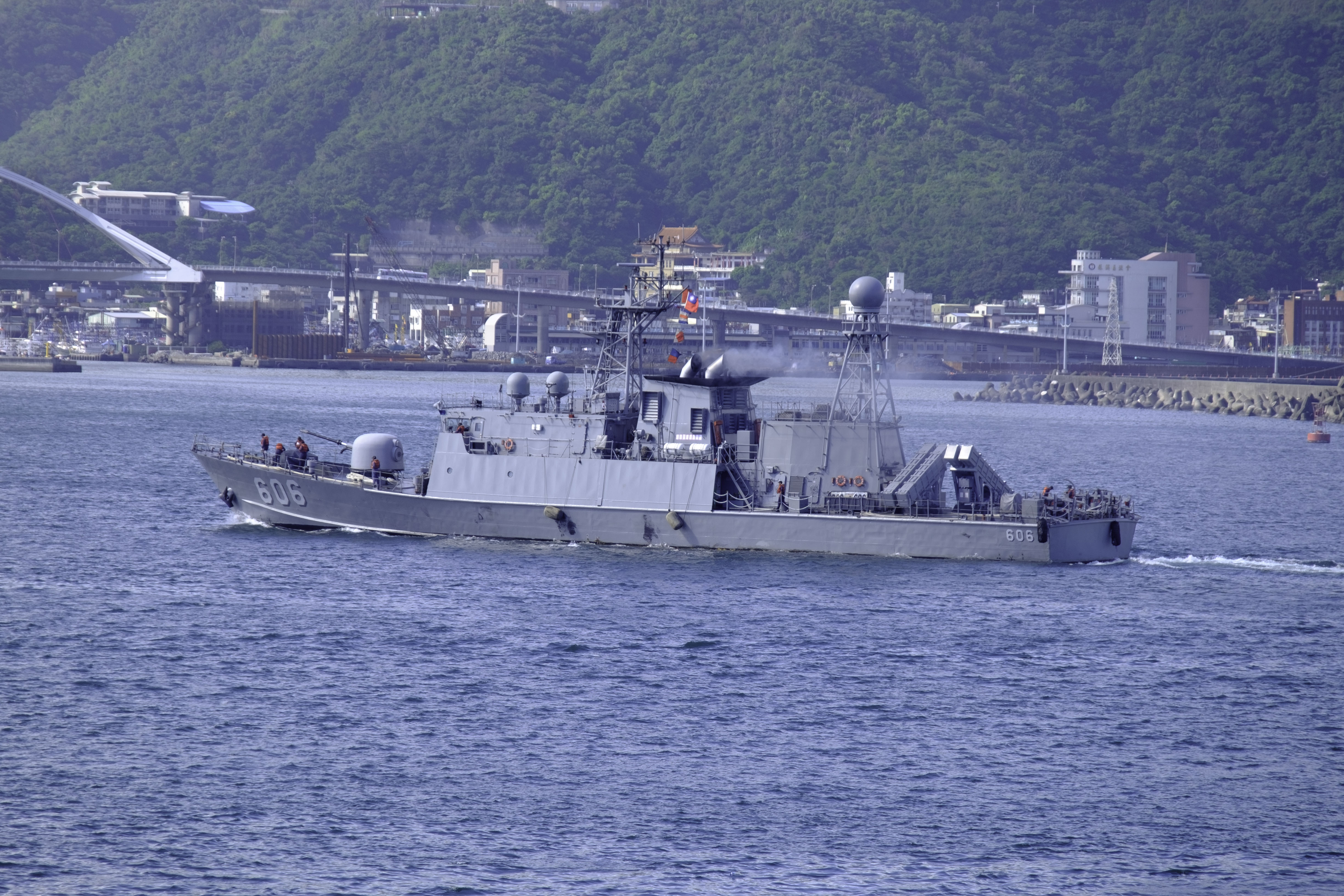
PGG-606

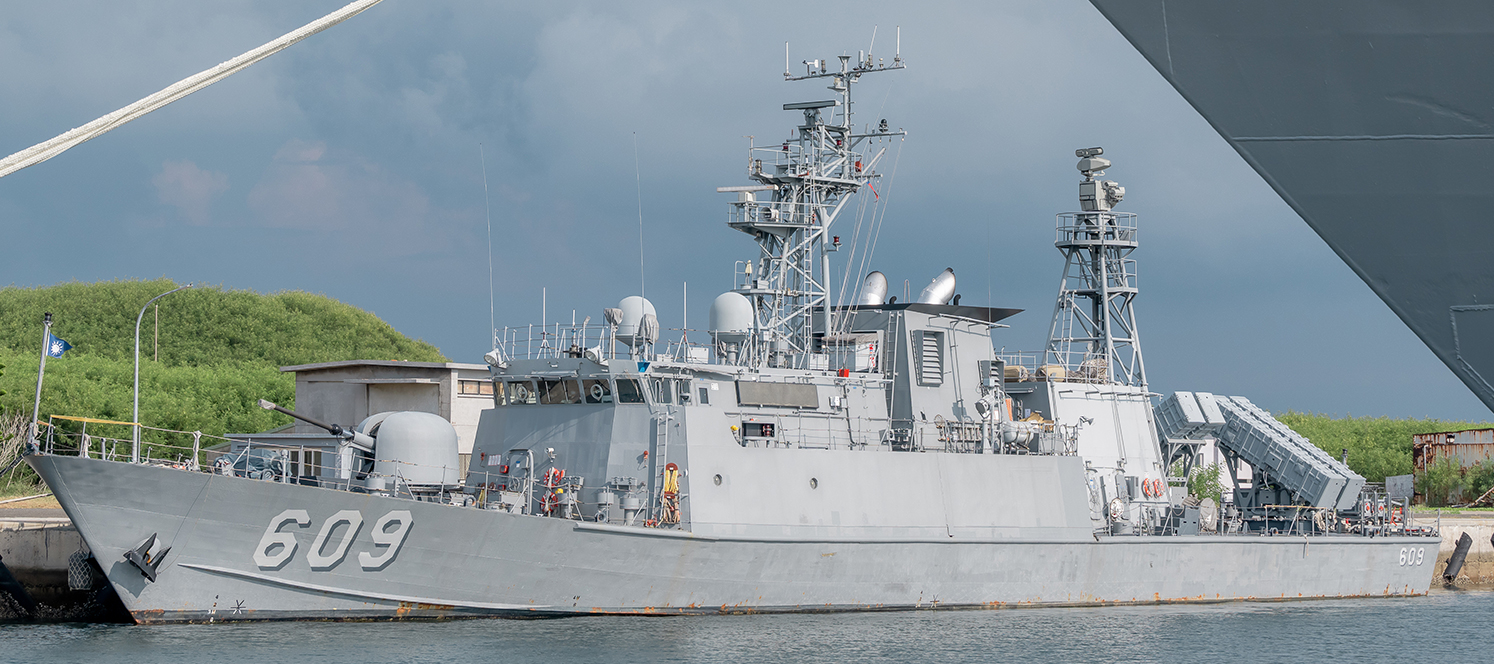
PGG-609

== See also ==
- Tuo Chiang-class
- Anping-class offshore patrol vessel
- Type 037 corvette
- Cyclone-class patrol ship
