= Han Kuang Exercise =

ROC Armed Forces annual military exercise

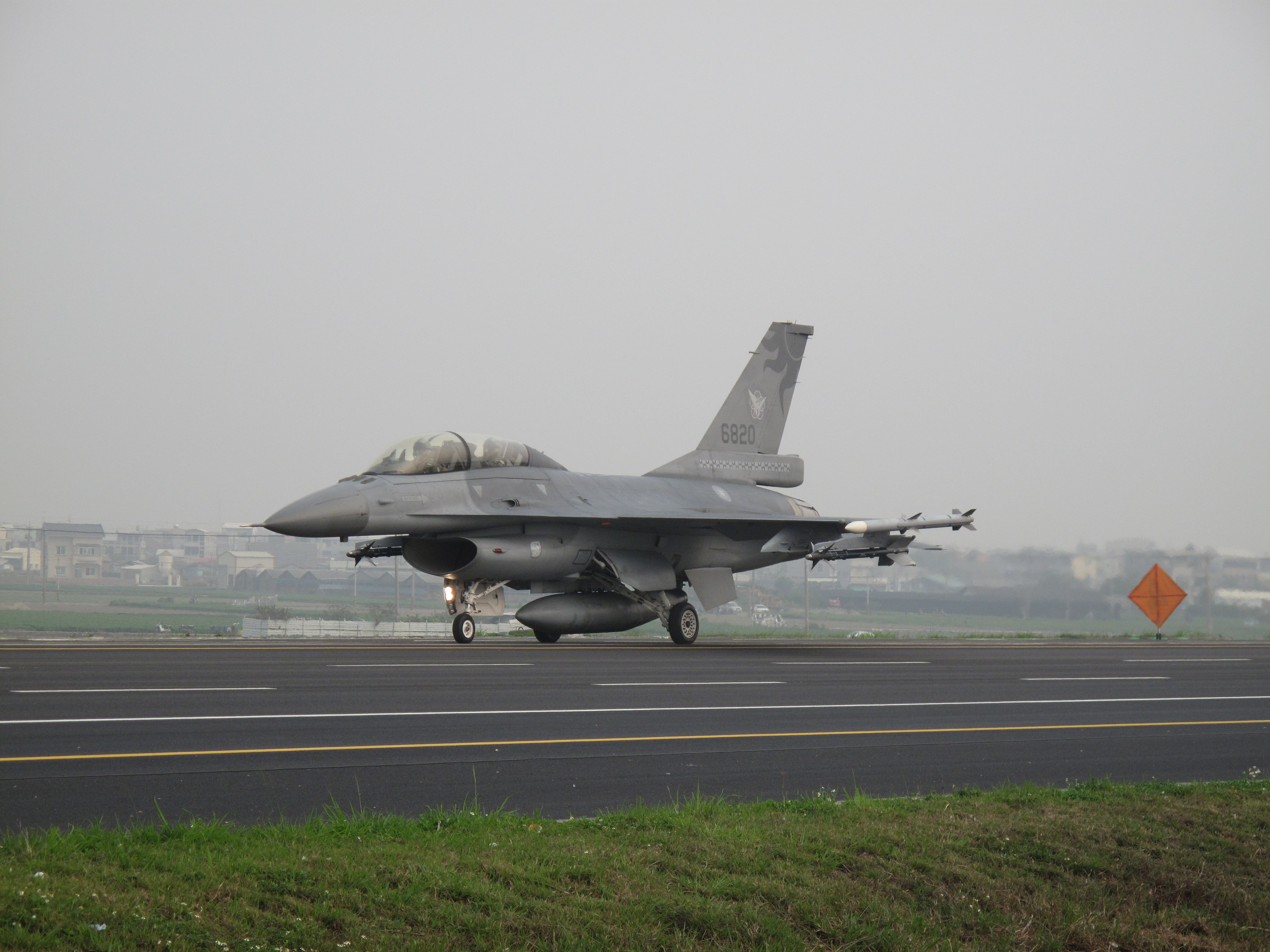
Republic of China Air Force aircraft during the Han Kuang Exercise.

The Han Kuang Exercise (Chinese: 漢光演習; pinyin: Hànguāng Yǎnxí) is the annual military exercise of the Republic of China Armed Forces in Taiwan, Penghu, Kinmen and Matsu for combat readiness in the event of an attack from the People's Liberation Army of the People's Republic of China.

== Overview ==
The exercise is divided into two phases, which are the Command Post Exercise (CPX) and the computer-simulated war gaming followed by Field Training Exercises (FTX). It is generally five days long.

Since at least 2017 the exercise has been fully bilingual with both Mandarin and English being used.

== History ==
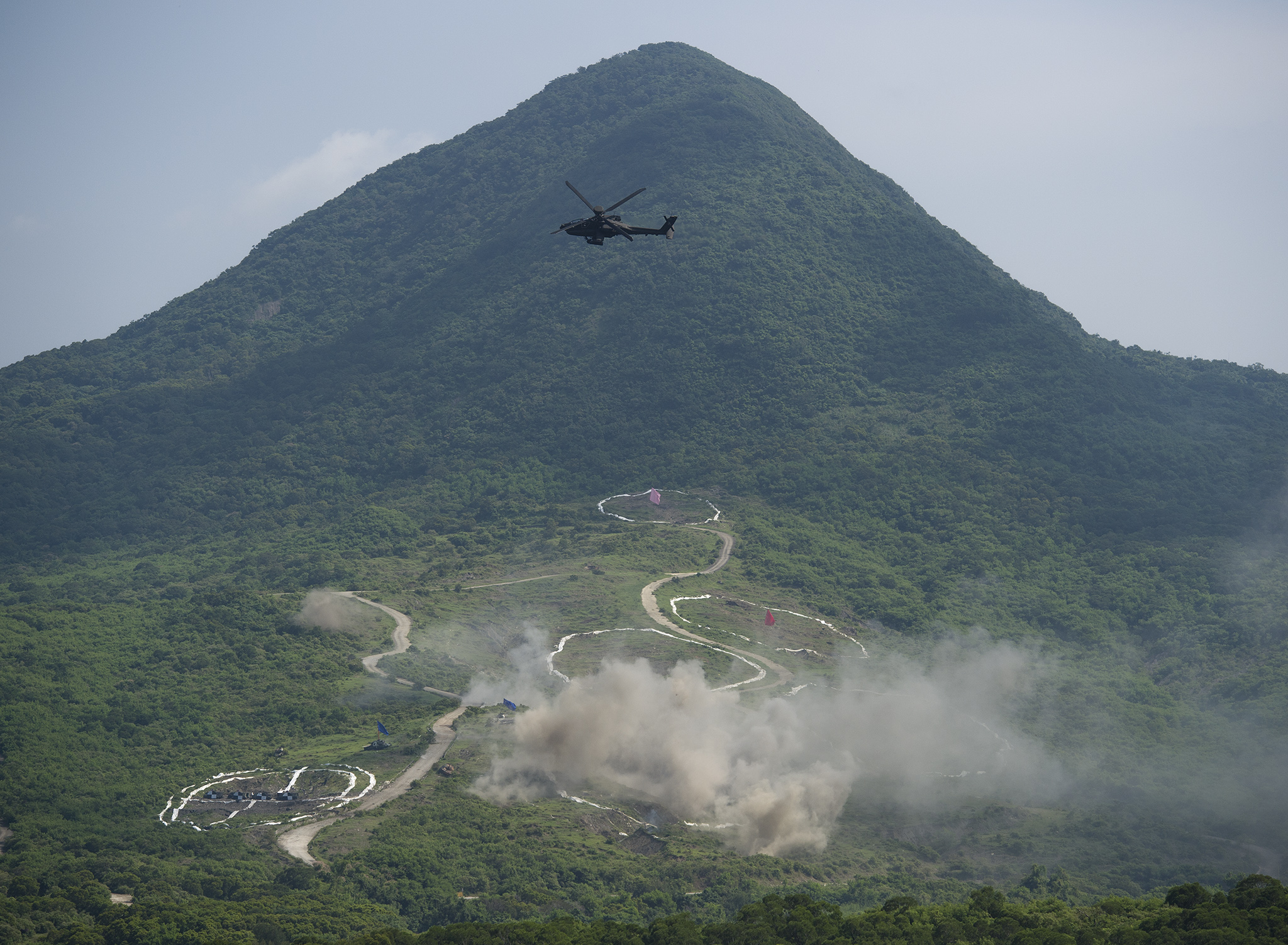
2016 Han Kuang Exercise

=== 1984 ===
The exercise was first held by Army General Hau Pei-tsun (the then Chief of the General Staff) on 23 April 1984.

=== 2000 ===
The 2000 exercise was held on August, focusing on anti-missile, anti-landing, anti-airborne landing and anti-air raid.

=== 2001 ===
The 2001 exercise was held from 26 March until 28 April.

=== 2006 ===
The 2006 exercise was held at the coastal area of Yilan County, attended by President Chen Shui-bian and Vice President Annette Lu and involving around 13,000 servicemen. It was the first time the Patriot-II missiles were deployed.

=== 2008 ===
The 2008 exercise was held on 23–27 June for the computer-simulated war gaming, while the field training exercises were held on 22–26 September.

=== 2011 ===
The 2011 exercise was held on 11–15 April in Taichung City and Pingtung County.

=== 2012 ===
In the 2012 exercise, President Ma Ying-jeou was out of Taiwan during the drill due to his diplomatic visits to three African countries, making the first time of the exercise with the absence of the president.

=== 2013 ===
The 2013 5-day exercise was held in April 2013 in Penghu.

=== 2014 ===
The 2014 exercise was held in Chiayi County and Penghu County. Civilian airplanes were used for the first time for personnel transport, carrying military officers and reservists from Kaohsiung to Penghu.

=== 2015 ===
The 2015 exercise consisted of two stages. The first stage was held on 4–8 May 2015, designed to test the military's combat capabilities after undergoing streamlining processes at the end of 2014. The second stage was held from 7–11 September 2015 simulating an attack from the People's Liberation Army. New weapon systems of Lockheed P-3 Orion marine patrol aircraft, Tuo Jiang stealth missile corvette, Pan Shi supply vessel, Cloud Leopard armored vehicle and remote-controlled aerial vehicles were deployed. The exercise was held at a military base in northern Hsinchu County.

=== 2016 ===
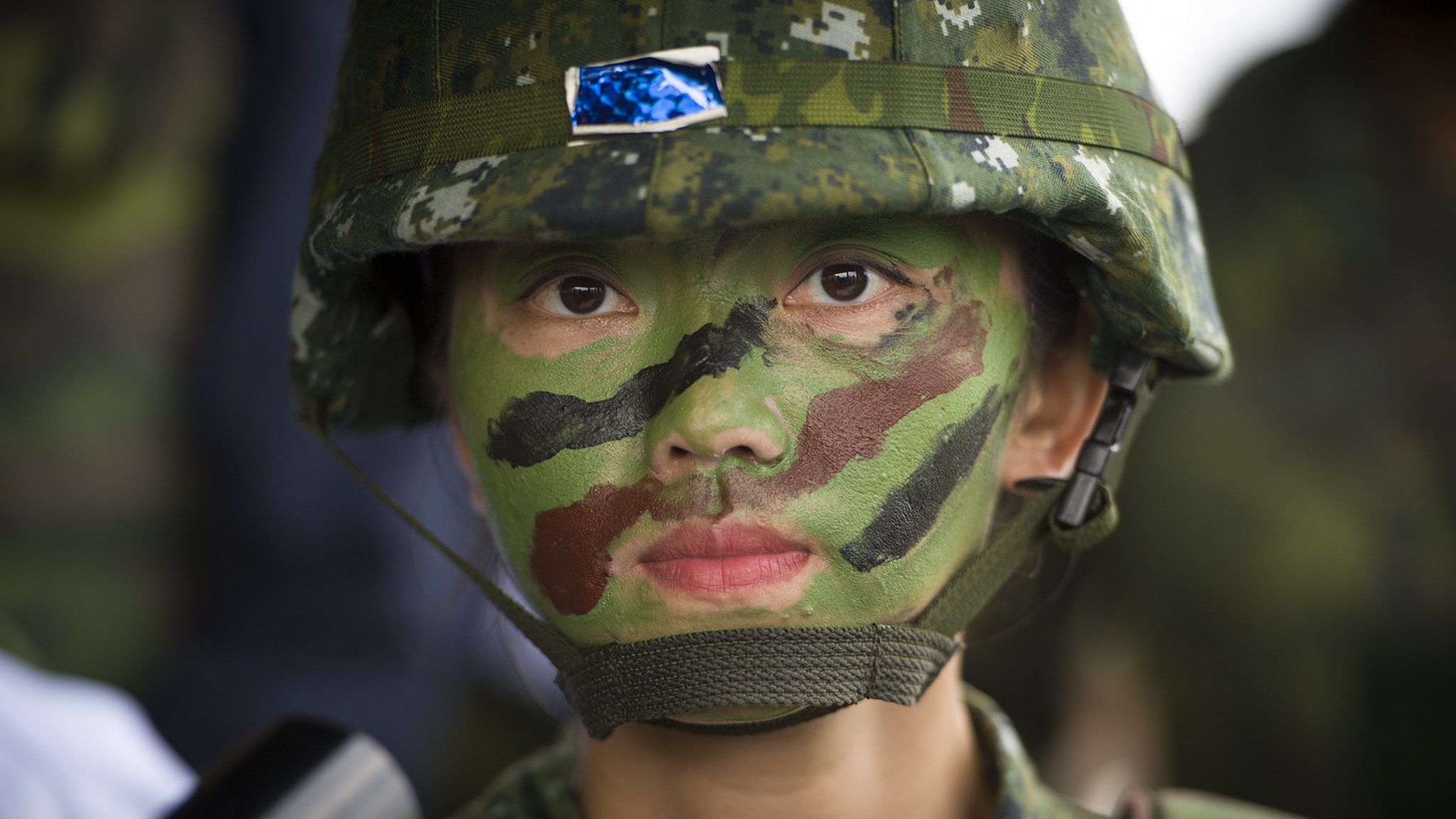
2016 Han Kuang Exercise

The 2016 exercise was held on 22–26 August 2016. The exercise saw the National Airborne Service Corps involved for the first time. There were in total 1,072 tests performed during the exercise.

=== 2017 ===
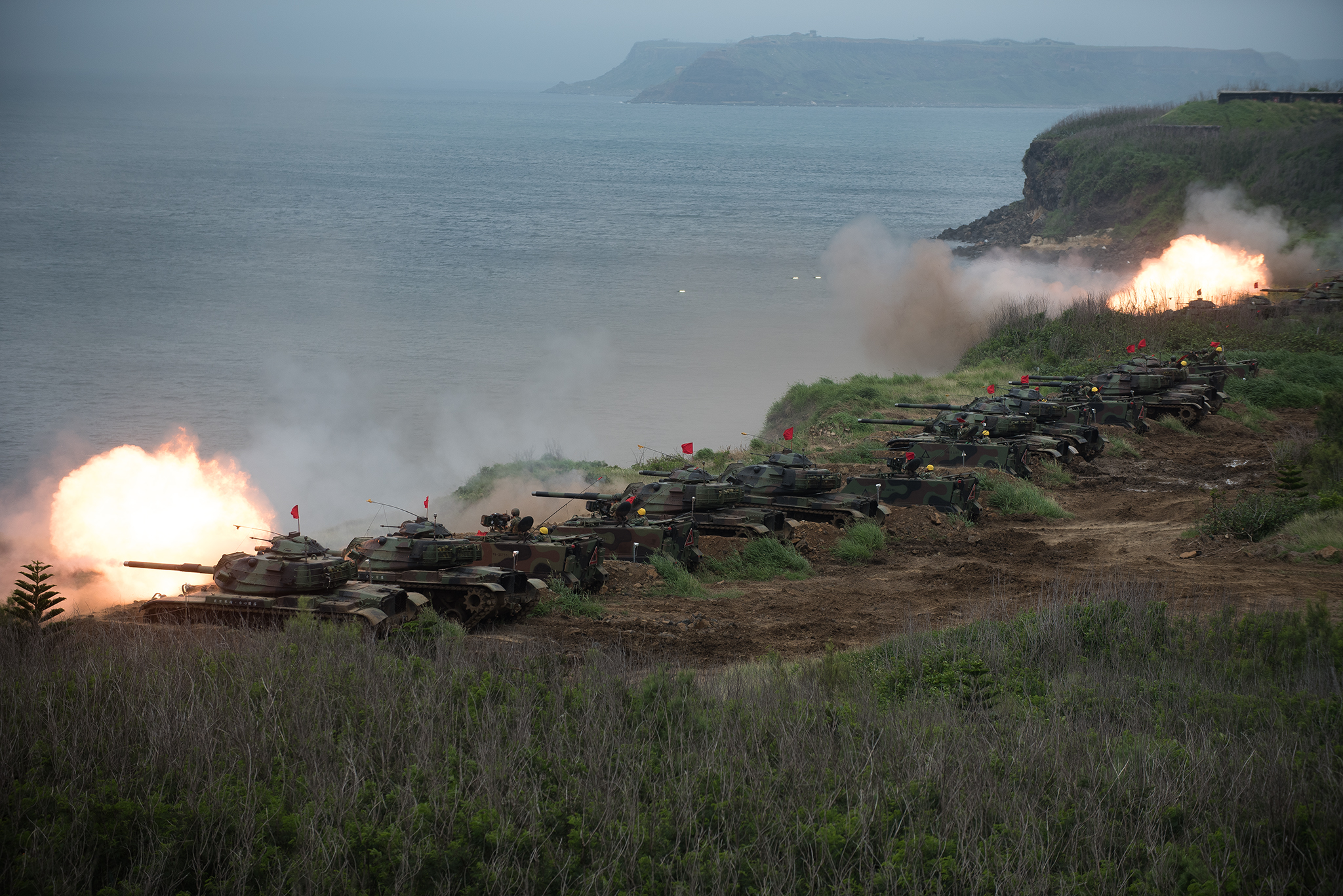
2017 Han Kuang Exercise

The 2017 exercise consisted of two stages. The first stage was held on 1–5 May 2017. The exercise included scenario when the People's Liberation Army (PLA) deploys three aircraft carriers, stealth aircraft and missiles. It focused on preserving combat capability using the collected information and surveillance data and countering the blockades and landings in Taiwan.

The second stage was held on 22–26 May 2017. It included simulations of attacks on Ching Chuan Kang Air Base by the PLA to test the ROC armed forces combat and defense capabilities on the coordinated response to simulated threats from the PLA. The exercise included locations such as Penghu and Taiping Island.

=== 2018 ===
The 2018 exercise was held on 4 June 2018 for five days. It was proceeded with computer-aided war games on 30 April to 5 May. The exercise consists of several main points, which are joint air-sea combat operation, anti-landing operations and joint anti-airborne combat operations. This exercise was also the first one to include civilian resources in its drill. On the first day of the exercise, an F-16 fighter jet with tail number 6685 went missing at 1:43 p.m. over northern Taiwan after taking off at 1:09 p.m. The aircraft was subsequently found crashed at 4:18 p.m. by fire fighters after receiving initial reports from a hiker at 3:22 p.m. The air force then ordered to temporarily grounded all of F-16 aircraft until further notice pending investigation.

=== 2019 ===
The 2019 exercise started with computer-aided war games between 22 and 26 April 2019. It then continued with live-fire drills on 27–21 May 2019. The live exercise featured the takeoff and landing exercise of the Republic of China Air Force aircraft on the Huatan section of National freeway 1 in Changhua County.

=== 2020 ===
The 2020 exercise saw the participation of the National Police Agency's Thunder Squad and the Coast Guard Administration's Special Task Unit for the first time. They participated alongside military special forces units in anti-decapitation drills.

During the 2020 exercise a Ching Chiang-class patrol ships with special electronic warfare equipment was used to interfere with the signals collection of Chinese spy ships operating off Orchid Island.

=== 2024 ===
The 2024 exercise was a significant departure from previous years being entirely unscripted and lacking major live firepower demonstrations. Special forces which in previous years had participated as a "red team" simulating PLA attackers focused instead on their actual wartime role of defense. The exercise focused on enabling units to act independently of higher command and practicing new rules of engagement. Parts of the exercise were curtailed or postponed due to Typhoon Gaemi. Forces involved were mobilized to help with disaster response. Firepower demonstrations were still held on the outlying islands, but the one planned for Kinmen was cancelled due to the need for civilian vessels to take shelter close to the shore to ride out the typhoon.

=== 2025 ===
The 2025 exercise was held from July 9 to July 18. The drills focused on scenarios including gray-zone harassment by the PLA, military exercises targeting Taiwan, homeland defense, and sustained warfare operations. According to photo released by the Military News Agency of the Ministry of National Defense, Major General Jay Bargeron, the Director of the Strategic Planning and Policy Directorate (J5) at the United States Indo-Pacific Command, participated in the Han Kuang Military simulation.

=== 2026 ===
On August 10, 2026, Taiwan held a drill in Taichung to prepare for a possible Chinese attack or natural disaster. Mobile Internet was slowed during the exercise, but basic phone calls still worked, while ATMs, traffic lights, landlines and fixed-line Internet continued to operate normally.

== Criticism ==
The exercises have been criticized as being more focused on public relations than actual warfighting capability. Reforms have been undertaken in response to these criticisms with the realism, scale, and rigor of the exercise increasing each year.

== See also ==
- Republic of China Armed Forces
- Ministry of National Defense (Republic of China)
