= Jin River (Bei River tributary) =

River in Jiangxi and Guangdong, China

Coordinates: 24°54′33″N 113°43′18″E

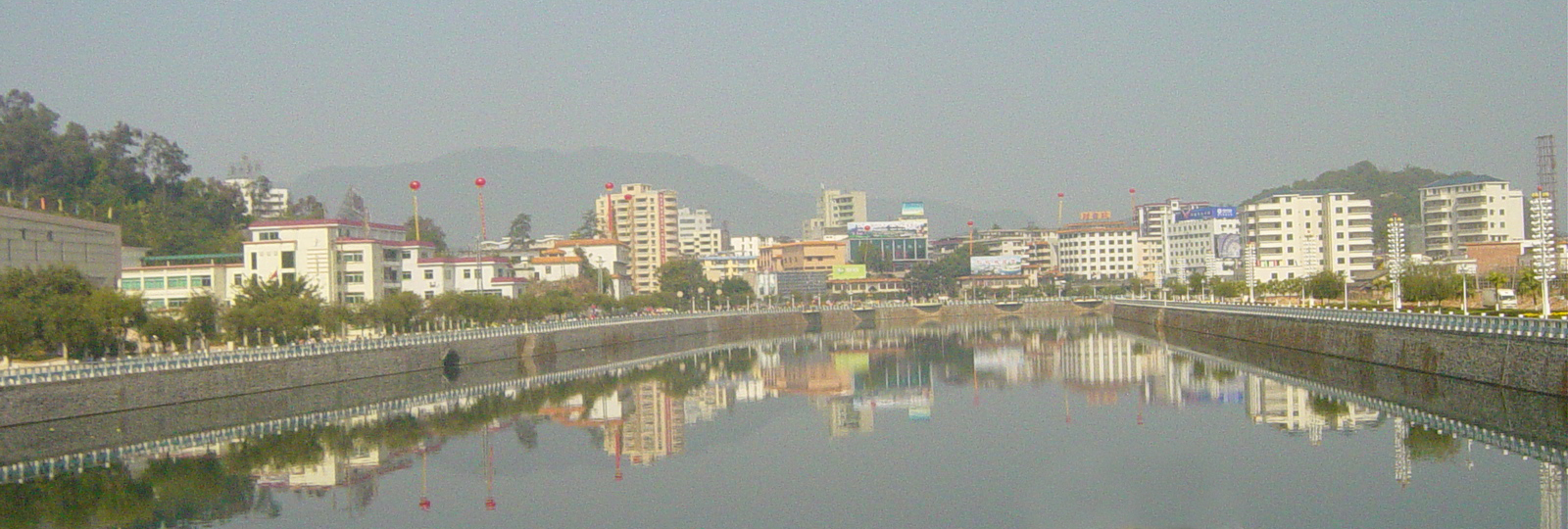
- The Jin River in Renhua, Guangdong
- Simplified Chinese: 锦江
- Literal meaning: Brocade River
Transcriptions
Standard Mandarin
- Hanyu Pinyin: Jǐnjiāng

Changjiang Creek
- Traditional Chinese: 長江河
- Simplified Chinese: 长江河
- Literal meaning: Yangtze Creek; Long-River Creek
Transcriptions
Standard Mandarin
- Hanyu Pinyin: Chángjiāng Hé

The Jin River is a river in China's Jiangxi and Guangdong provinces. It is a right tributary of Guangdong's Bei or North River.

== Geography ==
It rises in the southwestern Chongyi County, Jiangxi Province. The upper stream is called Changjiang Creek. The river runs southward joins Bei River at Baimangba, Renhua County in Guangdong Province. The river has a length of 108 kilometres (67 mi) and drains an area of 1,913 square kilometres (739 mi^{2}).

== See also ==
- Other Jin Rivers
- Rivers of China
