= Daqiao, Renhua County =

Daqiao 大桥镇
- Town
- Location in Guangdong
- Coordinates: 24°55′03″N 113°46′11″E
- Country: People's Republic of China
- Province: Guangdong
- Prefecture-level city: Shaoguan
- County: Renhua
- Village-level divisions: 1 residential community 6 villages
- Elevation: 81 m (266 ft)
- Time zone: UTC+8 (China Standard)
- Area code: 0751

Daqiao (simplified Chinese: 大桥; traditional Chinese: 大橋; pinyin: Dàqiáo; lit. 'great or large bridge') is a town of Renhua County in northern Guangdong province, China, located 20 kilometres (12 mi) from downtown Shaoguan in the southern part of the county, bordering Qujiang and Zhenjiang Districts to the south. The town is served by China National Highway 106. As of 2018, it has one residential community (居委会) and 6 villages under its administration.

== See also ==
- List of township-level divisions of Guangdong
