= Daping, Rucheng =

Town in Hunan, China

Coordinates: 25°26′55″N 113°41′46″E

Daping is a town in Rucheng County, Hunan province of China.
