= Chongyi County =

Chongyi County 崇义县 Tsungyi
- County
- Interactive map of Chongyi County
- Coordinates: 25.682°N 114.308°E
- Country: People's Republic of China
- Province: Jiangxi
- Prefecture-level city: Ganzhou

Area
  - Total: 2,206.27 km^{2} (851.85 sq mi)

Population (2010)
  - Total: 187,234
  - Density: 84.8645/km^{2} (219.798/sq mi)
- Postal Code: 341300

Chongyi County (simplified Chinese: 崇义县; traditional Chinese: 崇義縣; pinyin: Chóngyì Xiàn) is a county under the jurisdiction of Ganzhou Municipality, in the southwest of Jiangxi province, China.

== Statistics ==
Chongyi has an area of 2,206.27 km^{2} (851.85 sq mi) and population of 200,000.

== Administration ==
The county executive, legislature, judiciary are at Hengshui Town (横水镇), together with the CPC and PSB branches.

Chongyi County is divided to 6 towns and 10 townships.

6 Towns

- Hengshui (横水镇)
- Yangmei (扬眉镇)
- Guobu (过埠镇)
- Qianchang (铅厂镇)
- Changlong (长龙镇)
- Guantian (关田镇)

10 Townships

- Longgou Township (龙勾乡)
- Jieba Township (杰坝乡)
- Jinkeng Township (金坑乡)
- Sishun Township (思顺乡)
- Lintan Township (麟潭乡)
- Shangbao Township (上堡乡)
- Niedu Township (聂都乡)
- Wenying Township (文英乡)
- Ledong Township (乐洞乡)
- Fengzhou Township (丰州乡)

== Economy ==
Mining of uranium is carried out in the region.

== Climate ==
Climate data for Chongyi, elevation 280 m (920 ft), (1991–2020 normals, extremes 1981–2010)
Month	Jan	Feb	Mar	Apr	May	Jun	Jul	Aug	Sep	Oct	Nov	Dec	Year
Record high °C (°F)	27.2 (81.0)	31.8 (89.2)	32.9 (91.2)	34.3 (93.7)	36.4 (97.5)	37.9 (100.2)	39.7 (103.5)	39.9 (103.8)	38.4 (101.1)	37.6 (99.7)	33.8 (92.8)	27.2 (81.0)	39.9 (103.8)
Mean daily maximum °C (°F)	13.3 (55.9)	16.0 (60.8)	18.9 (66.0)	24.9 (76.8)	28.7 (83.7)	31.4 (88.5)	34.0 (93.2)	33.5 (92.3)	30.7 (87.3)	27.1 (80.8)	21.9 (71.4)	16.5 (61.7)	24.7 (76.5)
Daily mean °C (°F)	8.1 (46.6)	10.7 (51.3)	13.9 (57.0)	19.6 (67.3)	23.3 (73.9)	26.2 (79.2)	27.9 (82.2)	27.2 (81.0)	24.6 (76.3)	20.3 (68.5)	15.0 (59.0)	9.9 (49.8)	18.9 (66.0)
Mean daily minimum °C (°F)	5.1 (41.2)	7.5 (45.5)	10.9 (51.6)	16.2 (61.2)	19.9 (67.8)	23.0 (73.4)	24.0 (75.2)	23.7 (74.7)	21.2 (70.2)	16.3 (61.3)	11.1 (52.0)	6.1 (43.0)	15.4 (59.8)
Record low °C (°F)	−3.9 (25.0)	−1.7 (28.9)	0.6 (33.1)	6.7 (44.1)	11.5 (52.7)	16.1 (61.0)	20.8 (69.4)	20.2 (68.4)	13.9 (57.0)	5.6 (42.1)	0.1 (32.2)	−2.8 (27.0)	−3.9 (25.0)
Average precipitation mm (inches)	74.2 (2.92)	94.8 (3.73)	167.3 (6.59)	171.9 (6.77)	227.7 (8.96)	254.3 (10.01)	148.2 (5.83)	195.2 (7.69)	118.6 (4.67)	54.7 (2.15)	65.5 (2.58)	49.2 (1.94)	1,621.6 (63.84)
Average precipitation days (≥ 0.1 mm)	12.3	13.5	19.1	17.0	18.2	18.2	13.5	15.9	10.8	6.6	8.2	8.7	162
Average snowy days	1.2	0.9	0.1	0	0	0	0	0	0	0	0	0.4	2.6
Average relative humidity (%)	79	80	83	82	82	82	78	81	80	76	78	77	80
Mean monthly sunshine hours	67.4	64.9	58.2	83.2	104.9	113.6	184.7	168.6	134.5	139.9	112.6	103.0	1,335.5
Percentage possible sunshine	20	20	16	22	25	28	44	42	37	39	35	32	30
Source: China Meteorological Administration
