= Iu Mien Americans =

Americans of Mien birth or descent

Coordinates: 52.7667°N 22.7000°E

Total population
- 50,000 - 70,000

Regions with significant populations
- California, Oregon, Washington, Wisconsin, Alabama

Languages
- English, Iu Mien, Lao, Thai, Chinese

Religion
- Taoism, Yao folk religion, Buddhism, Christianity

Related ethnic groups
- Hmong Americans, Laotian Americans

Iu Mien Americans (Meiv guoqc Mienh) are primarily former refugees of the Secret War in Laos and the Vietnam War. While some Iu Mien families were granted political asylum and the opportunity to resettle in the United States prior to 1980, the great majority of Iu Mien immigrants to the U.S. arrived following the Refugee Act of 1980. Between the late 1970s to the early 1990s, thousands of Mien immigrants resettled mainly on the West Coast of the U.S. Today, the Iu Mien American population is estimated to be at 50,000 - 70,000.

== Classification ==
With regard to ethnicity, the Iu Mien are officially classified in China and most of Southeast Asia as a subgroup of the Yao ethnicity. In Vietnam, however, the term Yao is referred to as Dao. Further classification of the Yao ethnicity brings up three major groups: Pan Yao, Bunu Yao, and Pingdi Yao. The Pan Yao group is the largest in China and Southeast Asia, and it is this Pan Yao group that Iu Mien Americans belong.

The Yao ethnicity was officially recognized by the Chinese government in the 1950s. The newly established Chinese communist government embarked on a project of "ethnic classification" that aimed to formally acknowledge the diverse ethnic groups within China. To accomplish this, government research teams were formed and tasked with studying common geographic regions, languages, cultural traditions, physical characteristics, and other defining factors. Upon completion of the project, the Yao or Yaozu people were officially recognized as one of the fifty-four ethnicities in China (list of ethnic groups in China). In 1974, an additional ethnicity (Jino) was included, bringing the total number of recognized ethnicities to fifty-five.

However, the Iu Mien, along with other subgroups classified as Yao, do not refer to themselves as "Yao." For the Iu Mien, they often refer to themselves as Iu Mien or Mien.

== History ==
Although ancient Chinese records about the Yao (Mien) are inconsistent, they tend to converge around the idea that tribes residing in the northern Hunan province, near Dongting Lake and its "Five Streams," shared a common ancestry and cultural heritage. Southern China, before the Qin dynasty (221 BCE), encompassed territories beyond the Han Chinese heartland, which were inhabited by diverse tribal groups, some indigenous to the region and others not. Chinese states often categorized these tribal groups into designated geographical networks for administrative convenience.

The terms "Man" (barbarians), "Nanman" (southern barbarians), "Jing Man" (Chu barbarians), and "Yiren" (uplanders) are general classifications that encompassed various groups. Even variations of Yao, such as Moyao, Yaoren, and Manyao, were not limited to a particular ethnicity or tribal group. Nonetheless, it is widely acknowledged that some of the indigenous groups inhabiting the Dongting Lake region in ancient China are the forebears of the Yao people today.

According to certain Yao (Mien) texts and narratives, the Mien people were once inhabitants of a place known as "Qianjiadong," translated as "Thousand Family Grottos." The story goes that this stunning and tranquil valley could only be accessed via an unremarkable cave, which was also the only way in or out. The fabled homeland was reputedly encircled by cascading waterfalls and rivers, far removed from the outside world. Although some people question whether Qianjiadong ever existed, scholars in China have discovered evidence in Hunan province that may indicate its plausible location.

Around the 10th century, and possibly earlier, the Yao (Mien) tribes in the Hunan region initiated a migration towards Southern China. Some groups ventured into more southerly provinces such as Guangdong and Guangxi, while others headed southwest into Guizhou and Yunnan. Over the ensuing centuries, various Mien subgroups in China migrated into Southeast Asia, initially settling in Vietnam and later expanding into Laos and Thailand. As highland farmers coexisting with other hill tribes in northern Laos, the Mien became part of the French Indochinese administrative system. However, the French departed from Laos and Southeast Asia entirely in the 1950s, creating a vacuum that was filled by the United States.

=== The Secret War ===
The Vietnam War (1956–1975) and the Secret War in Laos (1962–1975) propelled the Mien people into the Cold War. With the support of the CIA, the Mien and other hill tribes, including the Hmong (Miao), were recruited to fight against communist forces in northern Laos and other locations. The Mien's military role primarily involved safeguarding villages and serving as intelligence agents for the United States in the border areas near China. However, they also participated in one of the battles at Longcheng alongside the Hmong in 1970.

In the early 1960s, many Iu Mien families in Laos became involved in the United States CIA missions during the "Secret War" in Laos. They provided intelligence, surveillance, and armed manpower to block weapon transfers along parts of the Ho Chi Minh trail. As a result of their involvement, three significant Iu Mien figures emerged: Colonel Chao Mai Saechao, Colonel Chao La Saechao, and Captain Vern Chien Saechao. When Colonel Chao Mai died in 1967, his younger brother, Chao La Saechao, was promoted to Colonel.

In 1975, when the American forces withdrew from Vietnam and Laos, the Lao People's Democratic Republic led by the Pathet Lao Communists was established, and many families who supported the CIA were forced to flee to Thailand to escape political persecution. Thus, as communist forces swept through Laos in that same year, a significant number of Mien people fled to Thailand, crossing the Mekong River. As refugees, they encountered considerable hardships without a place to call home for nearly ten years.

=== Resettlement ===
From the late 1970s to the early 1990s, with the assistance of the United Nations Refugee Agency (UNHCR), thousands of Mien families were able to emigrate to Western countries. While some chose to settle in Europe and Canada, the majority of the Mien chose to relocate to the United States, particularly in the coastal regions of California, Oregon, and Washington.

As a people hailing from ancient and isolated farming societies, the initial generation of Iu Mien Americans encountered numerous challenges, such as language barriers and acculturation issues, as they settled into vibrant and modern cities. As younger generations assimilate into American culture, they are confronted with issues such as generational gaps, the erosion of their language and culture, a loss of identity, and more. To address these resettlement issues, community-based organizations have emerged among Iu Mien American communities in Washington, Oregon, and California, offering direct services to aid in the transition.

Since their resettlement in America, Mien Americans have maintained historical connections with their counterparts in China and Vietnam. Furthermore, there are still many Mien American relatives who reside in Laos and Thailand.

== Population ==
Approximately 50,000 Iu Mien settled along the western coastal states of California, Oregon, and Washington. Approximately 10,000 or less have settled in other parts of the country: Alabama, Alaska, Texas, Tennessee, Michigan, Illinois, North Carolina, and other states. A discrepancy, however, in Iu Mien American population numbers has to do with the fact that Mien has yet to be included in the United States Census. Consequently, the margin of error could be anywhere from 10,000 to 20,000.

There were approximately 50,000 Mien in the US as of 2012, with 15,000 of that number in Sacramento, and 13,000 in the East Bay.

The city of Sacramento, California (especially in the Oak Park neighborhood), North Highlands, along with Oakland, Richmond, San Jose, Merced, Visalia, Stockton, Fresno, Yuba City, Oroville, Gridley, and Redding, have all become homes to sizable populations of Iu Mien Americans. In Oregon, the majority of Iu Mien communities are located in Salem and the greater Portland area, while in Washington, most of the population can be found in King County in the greater Seattle area.

Furthermore, Iu Mien people have settled all across continents of the world. The world over, there are Iu Mien who settled in the United States, Australia, Belgium, Canada, Denmark, France, Laos, Myanmar, New Zealand, Switzerland, Thailand, and Vietnam.

On July 7, 2007, Iu Mien Americans celebrated their 31st anniversary in Sacramento, California, and honored military service members, doctors, educators, scholars, leaders, and others with achievement awards. More recently, the Mien Festival held at Hiram Johnson High School in Sacramento on April 1, 2023, drew in thousands of participants.

== Culture ==
=== Yao (Mien) Taoism ===
Daoism, as it is currently practiced by the Yao (Mien) people, traces its origins back to the Northern Song Dynasty (960–1127). Emperor Huizong (1100–1126), a skilled calligrapher and practitioner of the Tianxin Zhengfa tradition, also known as the "True Rites of the Heart of Heaven," played a significant role in promoting the tradition and influencing the religious aspirations of the court. Unfortunately, the Northern Song fell to barbarian groups, and a Song prince had to flee south, eventually settling in Hangzhou in what is now Guangdong province in southeastern China.

In Hangzhou, the prince regrouped the remnants of the Northern Song and established the Southern Song Dynasty (1127–1229). Additionally, the Southern Song authorized missionaries to propagate the Tianxin Zhengfa tradition among non-Sinitic ethnic groups in Southern China, teaching them the tradition's rituals and a simplified form of Daoism that revealed secrets for healing and exorcism. The Yao (Mien) were among the first Southern peoples to convert to Daoism and adopt the Chinese writing system. As the tradition was likely passed down by Daoist masters from southeastern China, Yao ritual texts are still read today in the Guangxi Cantonese dialect.

=== Marriage ===
The patrilineal clan system plays a central role in identifying Iu Mien culture. The twelve Iu Mien clan names operate in a manner parallel to the Hmong clan system. Within the practice, intermarriages among the clan are essential. However, for members with familial relations, especially when those relations are of the same ancestral spiritual lineage, intermarriage is barred. Individual families have sub-clans that play a critical role in religious and social functions. Sub-clans hold greater social importance than clans as they maintain a closer relationship with individual members.

Marriage holds significant importance in Iu Mien society, as it is a crucial social function. The culture has distinct practices surrounding marriages and sexuality, with elders assuming a crucial role in presiding over such events. They are highly respected and play a central role in invoking protective spirits for newborns. The elders discourage premarital sex and childbearing out of wedlock, and any child born under such circumstances requires the groom's family to pay an additional dowry.

=== Music ===
In ancient times, the Yao (Mien) communicated through singing and sharing folk tales, which served as a philosophical and educational tool for passing on profound stories from one generation to the next. Singing and reciting these stories during noble ritual offerings to ancestors, as well as burning incense "Tao / Dao," were ways of keeping the community rooted and promoting peaceful harmony during ceremonies. Similar to the Tibetan "Book of the Dead" and the Three Bardo Thodol, the "Book of Death" contains the names of ancestors from birth to death, and the family lineage that has been passed down through generations.

The new generation of Mien music is reflected in the mixture of Hip-hop, Pop, and R&B, and some of these songs are known for their articulate, powerful, and political nature. Nowadays, Mien people often compose their own songs, or they translate Thai and Lao songs into Mien.

=== Traditional dishes ===
The Mien have a variety of traditional, plain, mountain-enriched dishes that feature a variety of greens and meats. Among the authentic dishes are Mien pork sausages, which are seasoned with Mien herbs.

In addition to these dishes, the Mien have also been influenced by other cuisines, such as Tum Som (papaya salad), which is originally a Thai/Lao dish, and Larb, a Thai/Lao dish. Other dishes include Klang Phen, a rice flour dish served with spicy bean paste and sour broth, steamed or boiled pork, chicken, or beef with tofu, Ka-Soy, rice noodle and meat salads, fermented pickled mustard greens, and fermented Mien bean paste known as thop choi/thop zhay. Roasted or baked fish is wrapped in banana leaf (or foil in modern times) and banana-leaf wrapped roast/steam ground-pork, beef, or chicken are also popular. A traditional condiment used in Mien cuisine is the Mien pepper sauce.

== Issues ==
There are many social problems facing the Iu Mien American community throughout the United States today.

Because of the CIA's operations and involvement in Laos at the end of the war, Iu Mien along with the US lost the war, forcing families to abandon their livelihoods, possessions, and property behind in Laos and immigrate en masse to the US. There, the first generation (first wave of arrival to America) of Iu Mien Americans encountered language barriers as well as extensive culture shock as they navigated the American culture, language, and modern social system.

First-generation Iu Mien Americans also faced obstacles in securing employment due to lack of education and job skills needed to successfully enter the workforce. Consequently, a large proportion of first generation Iu Mien Americans experienced unemployment and often relied on social service programs to survive, underscoring the important role government funding plays in providing social safety nets through social service programs. These critically timed benefits enabled family units to stay together and afloat during the transition period. English classes and job trainings boosted proficiency in English and job skills to join the workforce and build self-sufficiency.

Culture shock is perhaps the hardest challenge first generation Iu Mien Americans face in adapting to America. Intergenerational conflicts arise between parents and children over differing opinions and views on social issues and values. Through the school system, children encounter and quickly adapt to American culture, expressing themselves through music and fashion and exercising their freedom of expression toward their parents. Traditionalist parents interpret the children's behavior as disrespectful and deviant.

These intergenerational conflicts and the resulting confrontations adversely impact first generation Iu Mien Americans, evolving into emotional stress, loneliness, and mental illness over time. Iu Mien Community needs financial resources from the government to address mental health problems tremendously.

The other social problem that the first generation of Iu Mien Americans faces is illegal drug users. When they're confronted with social problems such as spousal conflict, and parents and children conflict, they do not know how to cope with the stress. Using illegal drugs to relieve stress and emotion is the primary factor in illegal drug addiction. The other factor contributing to drug addiction was that they believe illegal drugs such as opium can cure chronic illness so instead of going to see a doctor, they use the illegal drug to slow down the chronic pain. They often do not trust modern medical doctors. As consequence, some of the first Iu Mien Americans were addicted to illegal drugs.

The third major social problem is alcohol and gambling because of the lack of social activities for them to participate in, and isolation is the main cause of first Iu Mien Americans becoming alcoholics and gamblers. Iu Mien Communities lack financial resources and programs to address the social problem within Iu Mien Communities. Therefore, the government programs allocate funding to Iu Mien Community is essential and vital for their basic survival.

Due to rapid cultural adaptation, the second generation of Iu Mien Americans is less impoverished and societally disadvantaged than their parents. Using the financial foundations created by their parents, most second-generation Iu Mien Americans are capable of further educating themselves, and ranking higher in the workplace compared to their predecessors. Most second-generation Iu Mien Americans don't have children yet, as this generation is still nearing their reproductive years.The generations are all facing strategizing with coping mechanisms such as joining American culture and are at threat of losing their current and next generations origin culture putting the entire population at risk against higher populations like China or even the US country.

== See also ==
- Iu Mien people
- Iu Mien language
- Panhu
- Yao people

== Sources ==
- PBS, Death of a Shaman. The Film
- Archived 2015-02-14 at the Wayback Machine, Iu-Mien History, Iu Mien Community Services
- "News Fix Archives | KQED News".
- Alberts, Eli. History of Daoism and the Yao People of South China. Youngstown, NY: Cambria Press, 2006. Ebook
- Chen, Lianshan. Chinese Myths and Legends: Legends of the Universe, Deities, and Heroes. China International Press, 2009. Print.
- He, Hongyi. The Magical Ancient Books the Magical Ancient Books of The Yao People Of The Yao People: A Study of the Yao Manuscripts in the Collection of the Library of Congress. Ebook.
- Homsany, John-Thomas A. John F. Kennedy, The Soviet Union and The Laos Crisis, 1961–1962. California State University, Fullerton, 2000. Dissertation.
- Huy, Nguyen V. & Kendall, Laurel. Vietnam: Journeys of Body, Mind, and Spirit. Berkeley and Los Angeles, California: University of California Press, 2003. Print.
- Jonsson, Hjorleifur. Mien Relations: Mountain People and State Control in Thailand. Ithaca and London: Cornell University Press, 2005. Print
- Jonsson, Hjorleifur. War's Ontogeny: Militias and Ethnic Boundaries in Laos and Exile. Southeast Asian Studies, Vol. 47, No. 2, September 2009. Journal.
- Leary, William M. The CIA and the "Secret War" in Laos: The Battle for Skyline Ridge, 1971–1972. The Journal of Military History, Vol. 59, No. 3 (Jul., 1995), pp. 505–517. Journal.
- Lemoine, Jacques. Yao Ceremonial Paintings. Bangkok, Thailand: White Lotus Co. Ltd., 1982. Print.
- Lewis, Paul & Elaine. Peoples of the Golden Triangle: Six Tribes in Thailand. London, New York, NY: Thames and Hudson, 1984. Print.
- Litzinger, Ralph A. Other Chinas: The Yao and the Politics of National Belonging. Durham and London: Duke University Press, 2000. Print.
- Luh, Shu S. The People of China (China: The Emerging Superpower). Philadelphia, PA: Mason Crest: 2014. Ebook.
- MacDonald, Jeffrey L. Transnational Aspects of Iu-Mien Refugee Identity. New York, NY: Garland, 1997. Print.
- Saechao, David. From Mountains to Skyscrapers: The Journey of the Iu Mien. 2018. Print.
- Seac, Fmprc & Guo Luc G. Yao with Statistical Data. Beijing and Washington: Intercultural Press, 2014. Ebook.
