= Yao people (Asia) =

Ethnic group in China and Vietnam

Yao People
瑶族
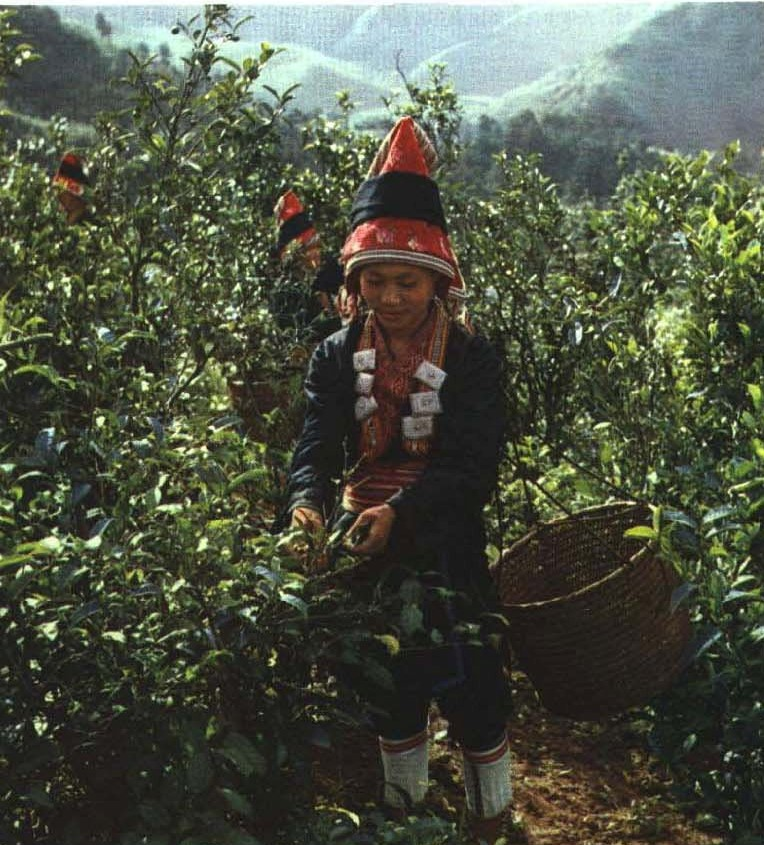
- 1964 photograph of Yao girls picking tea leaves in Liannan Yao Autonomous County, Guangdong

Total population
- 4,000,000+

Regions with significant populations
- China: 3,309,341 (2020); Vietnam: 891,151 (2019); United States 60,000 (2019)

Languages
- Mienic languages, Bunu, Pa-Hng, Lakkja, Chinese (Mandarin Chinese, Shaozhou Tuhua, Xiangnan Tuhua, Dong), Vietnamese, English

Religion
- Predominantly Yao folk religion, minority Buddhism

Related ethnic groups
- Hmong, She

Yao people

Chinese name
- Chinese: 瑶族
Transcriptions
Standard Mandarin
- Hanyu Pinyin: Yáo zú
- IPA: [jǎʊ tsǔ]
Wu
- Romanization: yau zoh
Hakka
- Romanization: Yâu-tshu̍k
Yue: Cantonese
- Yale Romanization: yìuh juhk
- Jyutping: jiu4 zuk6
Southern Min
- Hokkien POJ: Iâu-cho̍k
- Teochew Peng'im: Iêu-tsôk
Eastern Min
- Fuzhou BUC: Ièu-cŭk

Vietnamese name
- Vietnamese alphabet: người Dao
- Hán-Nôm: 𠊛猺

The Yao people (simplified Chinese: 瑶族; traditional Chinese: 瑤族; pinyin: Yáozú) or Dao (Vietnamese: người Dao) is a classification for various ethnic minorities in China and Vietnam. Their majority branch is also known as Mien. They originated in the areas around Changsha, which today is the capital of Hunan province. They speak a branch of the Hmong-Mien family of languages and share a strong genetic connection to the Hmong peoples. They are believed to have diverged with the Hmong around 5,800 years ago from tribes along the Yangtze River.

They are one of the 56 officially recognized ethnic groups in China and reside in the mountainous southwest and south of the country. They also form one of the 54 ethnic groups officially recognized by Vietnam. They numbered 3,309,341 in the 2020 Chinese census and 891,151 in the 2019 Vietnamese census. An estimated 60,000 Yao of the Iu Mien branch reside in the United States, mostly in the Western coastal states.

== History ==
=== China ===
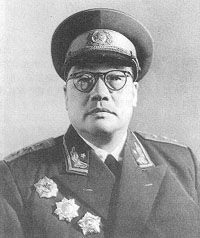
Li Tao, a general of Yao ethnicity in the People's Liberation Army

==== Origin myth ====
The origins of the Yao or Iu-mienh can be traced back two millennia to Hunan around the Dongting Lake region. According to a Yao tale, the Chinese Emperor Gao Xin was saved from an enemy chieftain by his faithful dog, Pan Hu. As a reward, Pan Hu was turned into a man and given the emperor's daughter in marriage. The descendants of the two became the Yao people. This tale was used as a basis for their connection to the Mo Yao, a group of highlanders who were exempt from forced labour during the Tang dynasty (618–907). Between 200 BCE and 900 CE, the Yao migrated into mountainous areas to the south of the Yangtze River.

==== Historical records ====
As the Yao lacked their own written language until recently, much of what is known about their ancient history comes from ancient Han Chinese sources. In the Book of the Later Han Dynasty (25–225 AD), they are described as "liking five-colored clothes", "going barefoot" and being "colorfully dressed".

==== Conquest ====
The Yao or Iu-mienh were conquered by the Han Chinese between the 10th and 13th centuries. However, they were covered under a loose reign system known as the Jimi system or Tusi. The local chieftains collected tribute and taxes from their own people and paid taxes to the emperor.

During the Ming and Qing dynasties, rule over the Yao was tightened. Ming and Qing authorities sent in their own bureaucrats to directly collect taxes, supplanting the role of the Yao chieftains. The Yao and Miao people were among the rebels during the Miao Rebellions against the Ming dynasty during the 1370s and 1449. Conflict drove the Yao further south into the highlands between Hunan and Guizhou to the north and Guangdong and Guangxi to the south, and stretching into Eastern Yunnan. Some left for Southeast Asia.

Around 1890, the Guangdong government started taking action against Yao in Northwestern Guangdong.

After the Mao Zedong's Communist Party won the civil war in the late 1940s, the Yao benefited greatly from the ideology of equality and were able to access education, becoming part of the regional and national elite. They were often recruited as specialists to assist with the ethnic identification program within the framework of a large unified China.

=== Laotian Civil War ===
During the Laotian Civil War, the Yao tribes of Laos had a good relationship with U.S. forces and were dubbed to be an "efficient friendly force". They fought in favour of the (South Vietnamese) government against the communists. This relationship caused the new communist Laotian government to target Yao tribal groups once the war was over. This triggered further immigration into Thailand, where the tribes would be put into camps along the Thailand-Laos border.

=== Immigration to the United States ===
After obtaining refugee status from the Thai government, and with the help of the United Nations, many Yao people were able to obtain sponsorship into the United States (although many remain in Thailand). Most of the Yao who have immigrated to the United States have settled along the Western part of the US, mainly in central and northern California such as Visalia, Oakland, Oroville, Redding, Richmond, Sacramento, but also in parts of Oregon like Portland, Salem, and Beaverton as well as the state of Washington in Seattle and Renton. See Mien American for those identified as Mien.

== Culture, society, and economy ==
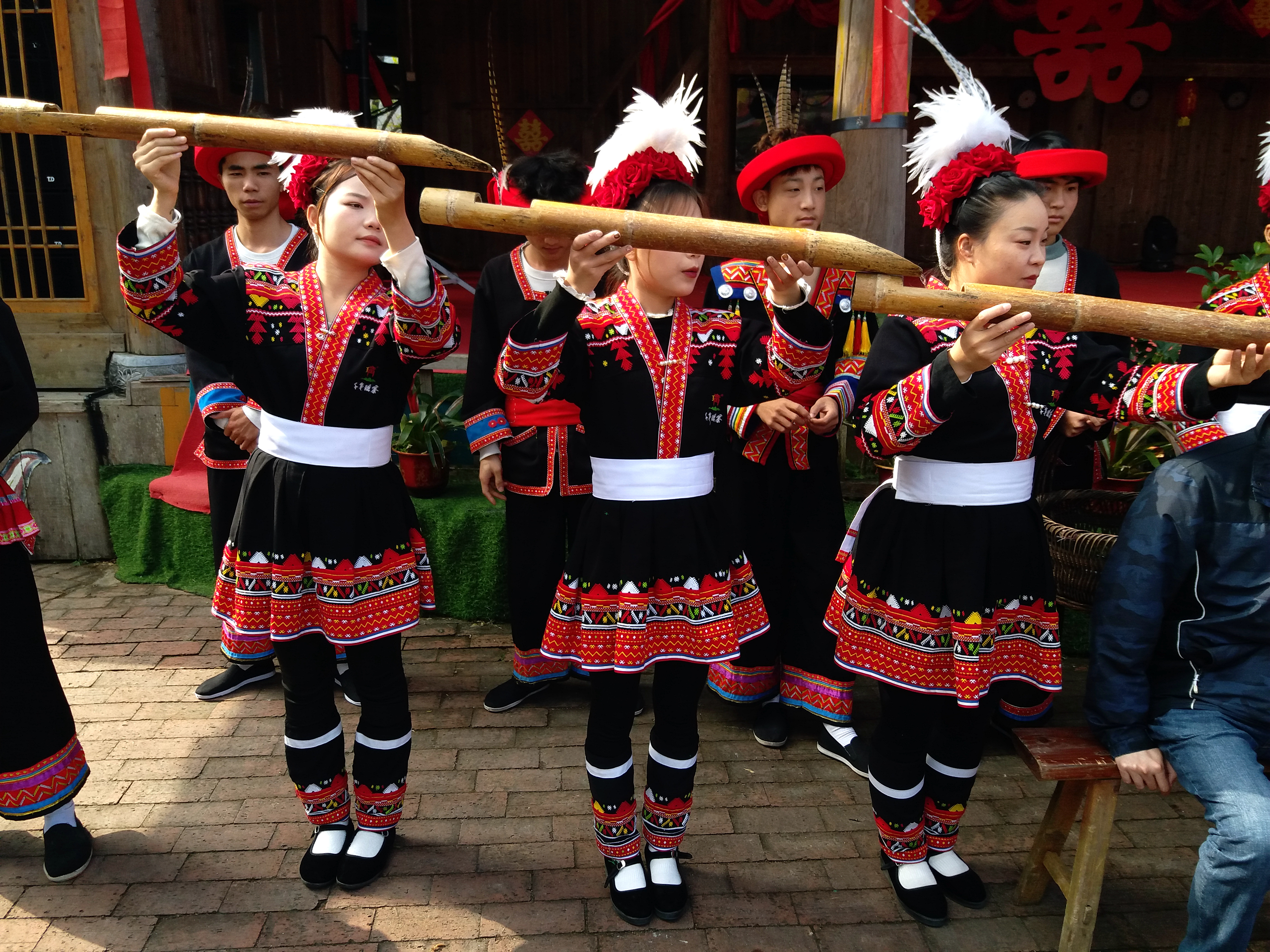
Yao people in Liannan delivering rice wine to guests using bamboo tubes (2025)

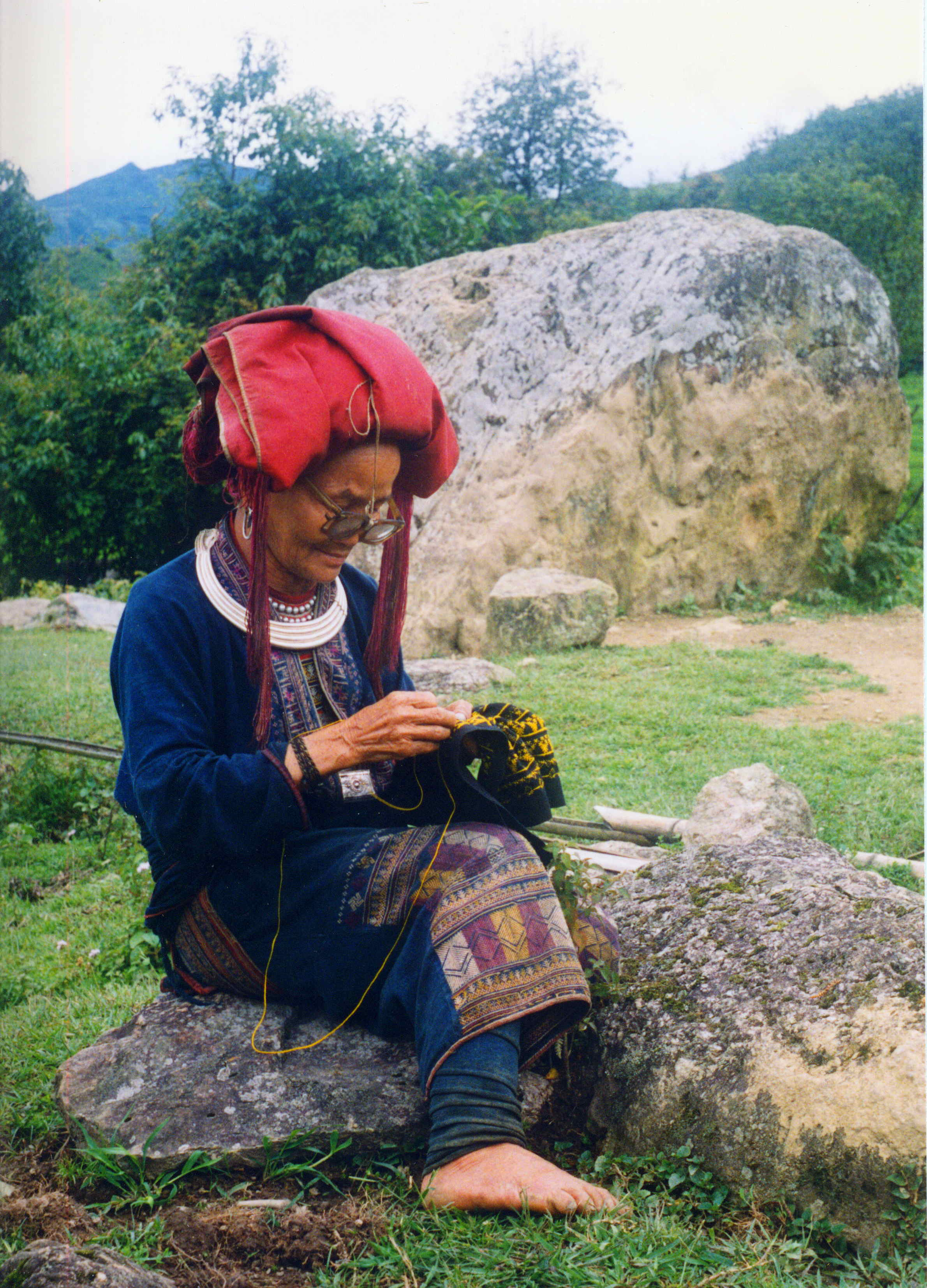
A red Yao woman in Vietnam

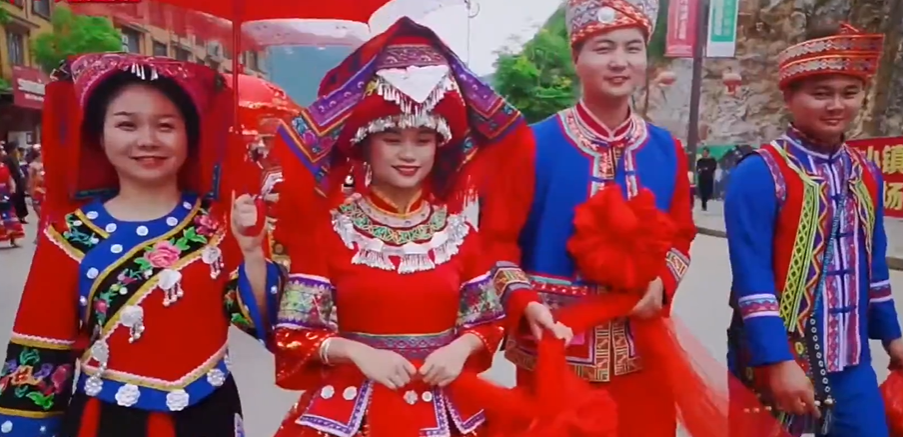
Yao wedding in Jianghua, Hunan (2020)

Yao society is traditionally patrilineal, with sons inheriting from their fathers. The Yao follow patrilocal residence. Polygyny was allowed until it was banned in China in the 1950s. Adoption was common among the wealthy.

The Yao people have been farmers for over a thousand years, mostly rice cultivation through plowing, although a few practice slash-and-burn agriculture. Where the Yao live nearby forested regions, they also engage in hunting.

During the Southern Song (1127–1279), an imperial Chinese observer, Zhou Qufei, described the Yao as wearing distinctive fine blue clothing produced using indigo.

The Yao celebrate their Pan Wang (King Pan) festival annually on the sixteenth day of the tenth lunar month. The festival celebrates the mythical original story of the Yao people, and has evolved "into a happy holiday for the Yao to celebrate a good harvest and worship their ancestors."

The women of the Red Yao group of Longsheng Various Nationalities Autonomous County are well-known for keeping their hair extremely long, only cutting it at three and eighteen years of age. Their tradition of keeping and dancing with long hair has turned the village of Huangluo into a tourist destination.

== Religion ==
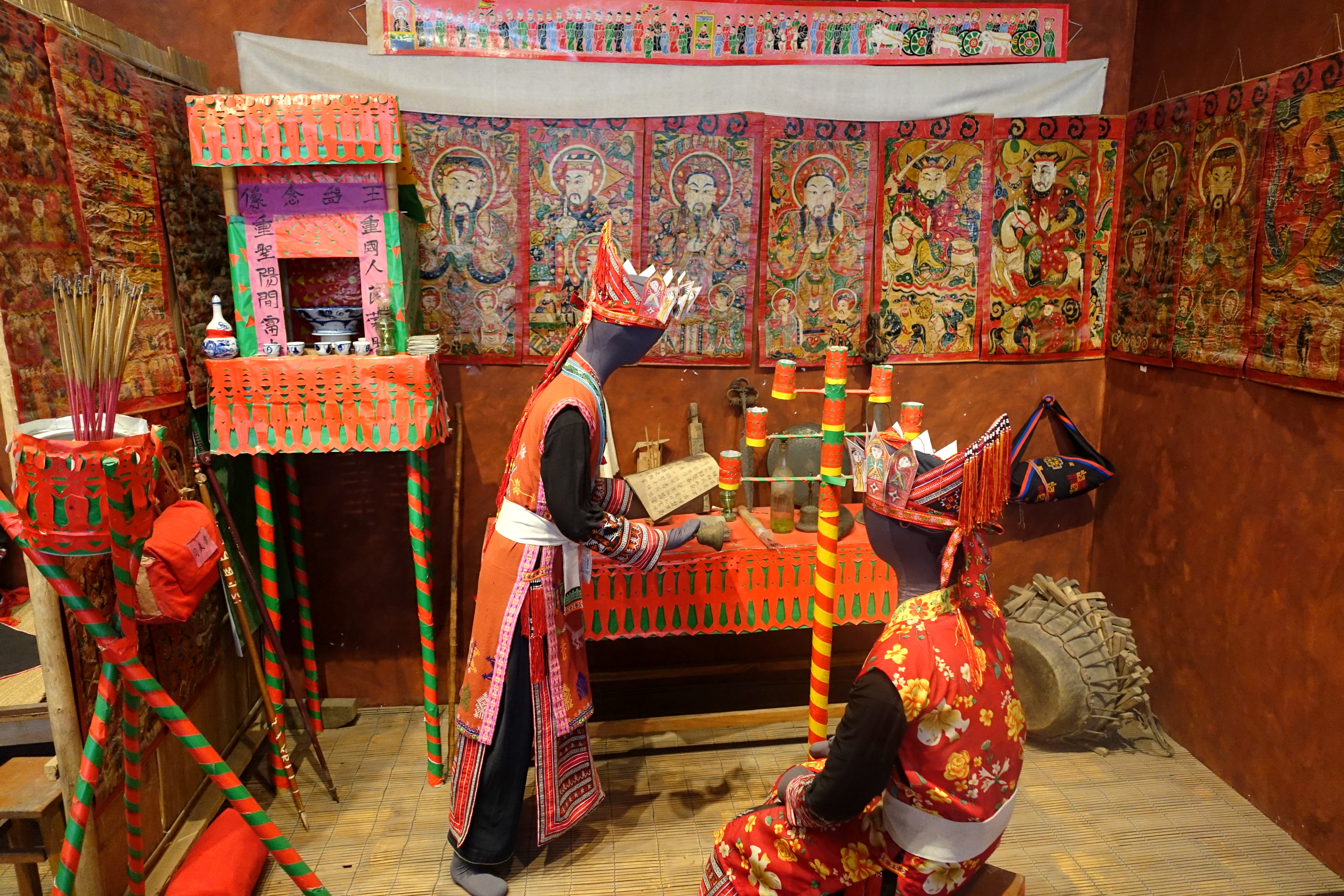
Simulate a ritual of the Red Yao people in Yên Bái province -Vietnam Museum of Ethnology, Vietnam

The description of Yao religion is similar to the definition of Chinese folk religion as described by Arthur Wolf and Steve Sangren. Like the Han, the Yao engage in patrilineal ancestor worship, celebrate lunar new year, and recognize a set a 18 gods and goddesses, mostly of Han Chinese origin. The Yao had shaman priests as part of their community who engaged in activities such as exorcism, spiritual communication, and divination using chicken bones or bamboo sticks.

Taoism has historically been important to the Yao. Jinag Yingliang, in a 1948 study, argued that Yao religion was characterized by (1) a process of Han Chinese-influenced Daoisation (Chinese: 道教化; pinyin: Dàojiào huà); (2) the endurance of pre-Daoist folk religion; and (3) some Buddhist beliefs.

Scholar Zhang Youjun takes issue with claims of "strong Buddhist influence" on the Yao, arguing that "although Yao ritual texts contain Buddhist expression, the Yao do not believe in Buddhism at all. They are resolutely Taoist."

== Groups and languages ==
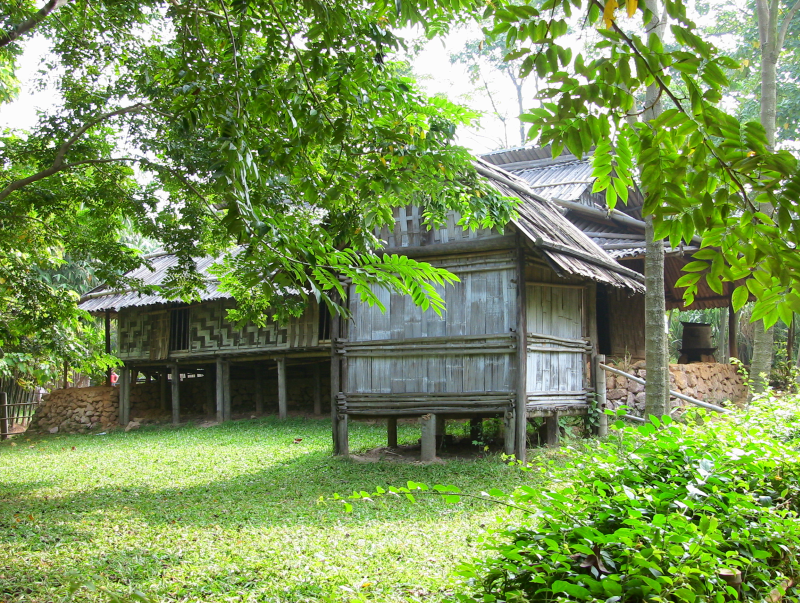
A Yao stilt house in Vietnam

There are several distinct groups within the Yao nationality, and they speak several different languages, The Iu Mien comprise 70% of the Yao population.

- Hmong–Mien languages
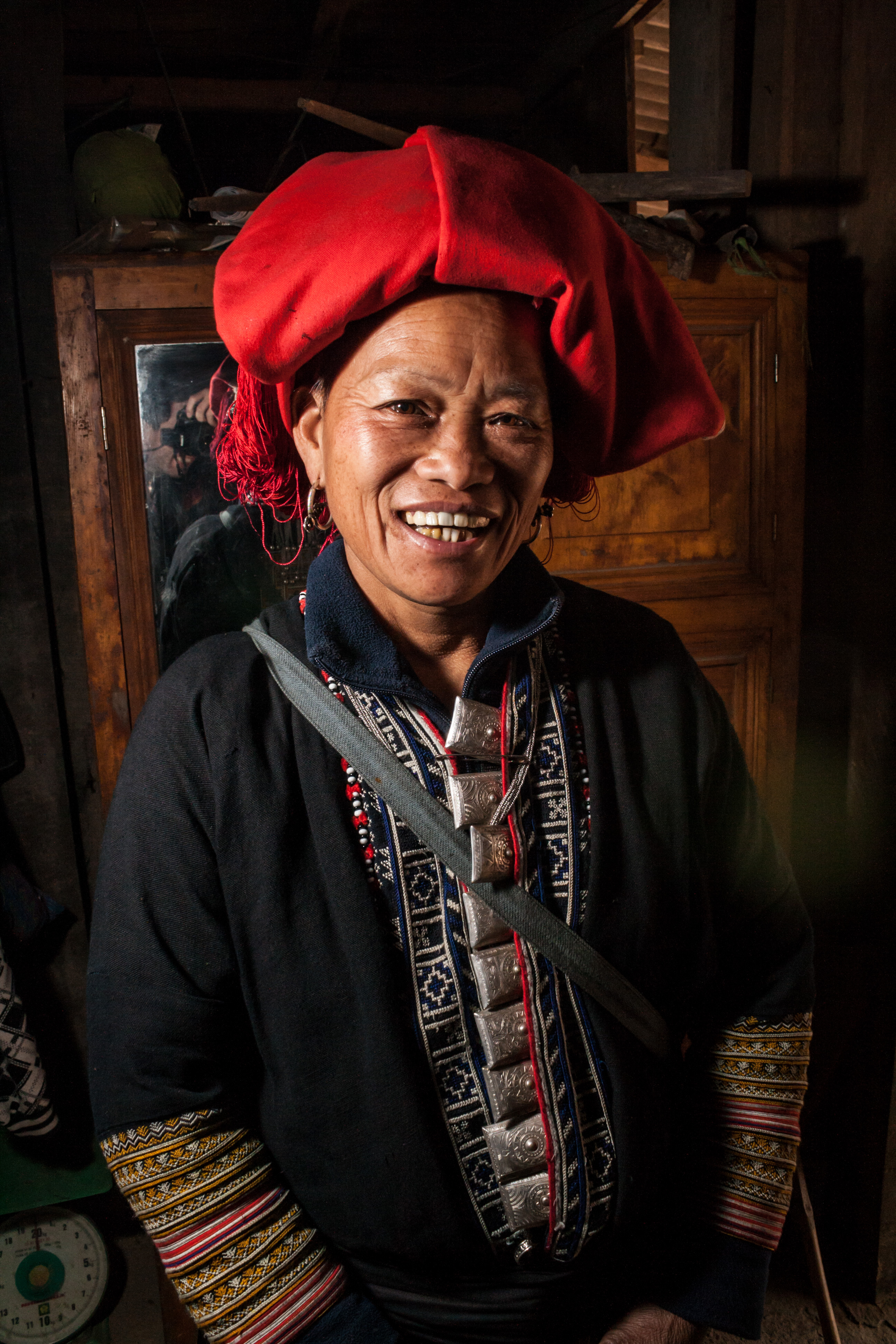
  - Red Yao woman in Sa Pa, Vietnam
    The Mien speak Mienic languages (simplified Chinese: 勉语; traditional Chinese: 勉語; pinyin: Miǎnyǔ), including:
    - Mian–Jin languages
      - Iu Mien, 2,172,000 speakers (1,699,750 in China, 350,000 in Vietnam, 40,000 in Thailand, 20,250 in Laos, 60,000 in the United States, 2,000 in France)
      - Kim Mun (also known as Lanten), more than 300,000 Yao people
      - Biao Mon, 20,000 speakers
    - Dzao Min, 60,000 speakers
    - Biao Min, 43,000 speakers
  - Hmongic languages
    - Bunu languages
    - Pa-Hng
    - Younuo
    - Kiong Nai
- Lakkja language (a Tai–Kadai language)
- Chinese
  - about 500,000 Yao speak Chinese dialects

In addition to China, Yao also live in northern Vietnam (where they are called Dao), northern Laos, and Myanmar. There are around 60,000 Yao in northern Thailand, where they are one of the six main hill tribes. The lowland-living Lanten of Laos, who speak Kim Mun, and the highland-living Iu Mien of Laos are two different Yao groups. There are also many Iu Mien Americans, mainly refugees from the highlands of Laos. The Iu Mien do not call themselves "Yao". Not all "Yao" are Iu Mien. A group of 61,000 people on Hainan speak the Yao language Kim Mun; 139,000 speakers of Kim Mun live in other parts of China (Yunnan and Guangxi), and 174,500 live in Laos and Vietnam.

The Bunu people call themselves Nuox [no˩˧], Buod nuox [po˦˧ no˩˧], Dungb nuox [tuŋ˧no˩˧], or their official name Yaof zuf [ʑau˨˩su˨˩]. Only 258,000 of the 439,000 people categorised as Bunu in the 1982 census speak Bunu; 100,000 speak the Tai–Kadai Zhuang languages, and 181,000 speak Chinese and the Tai–Kadai Bouyei language.

=== Mao (2004) ===
Mao Zongwu (2004:7–8) gives a detailed list of various Yao endonyms (i.e., self-designated names) and the Chinese names of various groups and clans associated with them. Endonyms are written in the International Phonetic Alphabet with numerical Chao tones.

- Autonym mjen31 勉 or ju31 mjen31 优勉: Pangu Yao 盘古瑶, Pan Yao 盘瑶, Panhu Yao 盘瓠瑶, Trans-Mountain / Guoshan Yao 过山瑶, Large-Board / Daban Yao 大板瑶, Small-Board / Xiaoban Yao 小板瑶, Board / Ban Yao 板瑶, Top-Board / Dingban Yao 顶板瑶, Sharp-Headed / Jiantou Yao 尖头瑶, Level-Headed / Pingtou Yao 平头瑶, Red-Head / Hongtou Yao 红头瑶, Arrow-Pole / Jian'gan Yao 箭杆瑶, Cattle-Horn Yao / Niujiao 牛角瑶, Tu Yao 土瑶 (in Hezhou, Guangxi), Native / Bendi Yao 本地瑶, Flowery / Hua Yao 花瑶 (in Yangshuo County, Guangxi), Ao Yao 坳瑶, Zheng Yao 正瑶, Liang Yao 粮瑶
- Autonym kim33 mun33 金门 or kem53 di35 mun21 甘迪门: Blue-Indigo / Landian Yao 蓝靛瑶, Shanzi Yao 山子瑶, Flowery-Headed / Huatou Yao 花头瑶, Sand / Sha Yao 沙瑶, Level-Headed / Pingtou Yao 平头瑶, Bazi Yao 坝子瑶
- Autonym bjau31 mɔn31 标曼 or ɕi31 mun31 史门: Min Yao 民瑶, "Four Great" Min Yao 四大民瑶
- Autonym bjau31 min31 标敏 or tɕau44 koŋ55 meŋ55 交公勉: East Mountain / Dongshan Yao 东山瑶 (in Quanzhou County, Guangxi), Dog-Headed / Goutou Yao 狗头瑶
- Autonym dzau53 min53 藻勉: Bapai Yao 八排瑶
- Autonym ju21 ŋjɛn25 优念, pjoŋ31 toa53 jeu31 炳多优, or ʂan33 tɕai33 珊介: Red Yao 红瑶 (in Longsheng Various Nationalities Autonomous County, Guangxi), Plains / Pingdi Yao 平地瑶
- Autonym pu53 nu25 布努: Beilou Yao 背篓瑶, Beilong Yao 背陇瑶, West Mountain / Xishan Yao 西山瑶, East Mountain Yao / Dongshan 东山瑶 (in Bama Yao Autonomous County, Guangxi), Tudi Yao 土地瑶, Tu Yao 土瑶 (in Pingguo County and Mashan County, Guangxi), Mountain / Shan Yao 山瑶, Man Yao 蛮瑶, East Valley / Dongnong Yao 东弄瑶, West Valley / Xinong Yao 西弄瑶, Fan Yao 反瑶, Anding Yao 安定瑶, White Yao 白瑶, Black Yao 黑瑶, Black-Trouser / Heiku Yao 黑裤瑶, Long-Shirt / Changshan Yao 长衫瑶
- Autonym nau35 klau42 瑙格劳 or pou22 nou12 包诺: Siting Yao 四亭瑶, Situan Yao 四团瑶
- Autonym kjɔŋ33 nai33 炯奈: Hualan Yao 花蓝瑶
- Autonym pa31 ŋ̊ŋ35 巴哼: Dog Yao 狗瑶, Eight-Surname / Baxing Yao 八姓瑶, Red Yao 红瑶 (in Liping and Congjiang Counties of Guizhou; Rongshui Miao Autonomous County and Longsheng Various Nationalities Autonomous County of Guangxi), Wood Yao 木瑶
- Autonym m̥n33 nai33 唔奈: Flowery Yao 花瑶 (in Longhui, Dongkou, Chenxi, and Xupu County and the Tongdao Dong Autonomous County of Hunan)
- Autonym ʑou13 nɔ13 优诺: Red Yao 红瑶
- Autonym lak25 kja25 拉珈: Tea Mountain / Chashan Yao 茶山瑶

=== Plains Yao ===
Groups considered to be "Plains Yao" (Pingdi Yao 平地瑶) include:

- Autonym Bingduoyou 炳多尤 (Pingdi Yao 平地瑶, Dainaijiang 代奈江): in Jianghua Yao Autonomous County 江华 of Hunan; Gongcheng 恭城, Fuchuan 富川, Zhongshan 钟山, and Lingui 临桂 counties of Guangxi
- Autonym Yeheni 爷贺尼 (Pingdi Yao 平地瑶): in Jianghua Yao Autonomous County 江华, Hunan (Jianghua County Gazetteer). The Yeheni speak Jianghua Tuhua. It is spoken in Taoxu Town 涛圩镇 and Helukou Town 河路口镇 in Jianghua County, Hunan.
- Autonym Younian 优念 (Pinghua-speaking Red Yao 平话红瑶; ʑou13 ȵen13): in Longsheng 龙胜 and Guanyang 灌阳 counties of Guangxi. According to Chen Qiguang (2013:30), the ʑəu21 ȵien21 number about 10,000 speakers in Sishui 泗水, Madi 马堤, Mengshan 孟山, Jiangliu 江柳, and other locations of Longsheng County.
- Autonym Shanjie 珊介 (Shanzi Yao 山仔瑶): in Fangcheng 防城, Guangxi
- Autonym Youjia 优嘉 (Yaojia 瑶家): in Guanyang County 灌阳, Guangxi
- Jingdong Yao 景东县瑶族 (autonym: Lewu people 乐舞人): Jingdong County 景东彝族自治县, Yunnan. According to the Jingdong County Gazetteer (1994:519), ethnic Yao numbered 3,889 individuals in 1990, and lived mainly in Chaqing 岔箐 and Dasongshu 大松树 of Taizhong 太忠乡.

=== Vietnam ===
Tim Doling (2010:82–83) lists the following Yao (spelled Dao in the Vietnamese alphabet) subgroups in northern Vietnam.

- Mienic groups
  - Iu Mien: Black Dao of Dien Bien and Lai Chau; Red Dao of southern Lao Cai, Yen Bai, and Son La
  - Kim Mien: Dao Tà Pán 大板瑶 (Dao Đại Bản, Dao Coóc Ngáng, Dao Sừng) of Ha Giang, Cao Bang, and Yen Bai; Red Dao of northern and eastern Lao Cai; Hongtou Red Dao 红头瑶 in northern Lai Chau
  - Kiem Mien: Red Dao of Sa Pa
  - Kam Mien: Coin Dao of Ha Giang, Cao Bang, Tuyen Quang, Thai Nguyen, and Bac Can
  - Kem Mien: Coin Dao of Hoa Binh and Son La
  - Quần Chẹt Mien: Hoa Binh, Son La, Tuyen Quang, Bac Can (also called the Dao Nga Hoàng, Dao Sơn Đầu)
  - Lô Gang Mien: Dao Lô Gang and Dao Đầu Trọc of Ha Giang, Cao Bang, Lang Son, and Mong Cai
- Kim Mun groups
  - Kim Mun: Dao Làn Tiển 蓝靛瑶 (including the Dao Tuyển, Dao Áo Dài, and Dao Đầu Bằng)
  - Kim Meun: Dao Quần Trắng 白裤瑶 and Dao Thanh Y 青衣瑶

According to Doling (2010), only Kim Mun, Kim Mien, and Lô Gang may be found outside Vietnam.

Nguyen (2004:14–15, 128) lists Đại Bản, Tiểu Bản, Khố Bạch, and Làn Tiẻn as the 4 primary subdivisions of ethnic Yao in Vietnam.

- Đại Bản
  - Dao Đỏ (Hùng Thầu Dào, Dao Coóc Ngáng, Dao Quý Lâm): located in Yen Bai, Lao Cai, Lai Chau, Tuyen Quang, Ha Giang, Cao Bang, Bac Kan, Thai Nguyen
  - Dao Quần Chẹt (Dao Sơn Đầu, Dao Tam Đảo, Dao Nga Hoàng): located in Hoa Binh, Ha Tay, Phu Tho, Vinh Yen, Son La, Yen Bai
  - Dao Thanh Phán (Dao Coóc Mùn, Dao Đội Ván, Dao Lô Gang, Dao Dụ Kiùn, Dao Thêu): located in Tuyen Quang, Bac Kan, Thai Nguyen, Lang Son, Quang Ninh, Bac Giang
- Tiểu Bản
  - Dao Tiền (Dao Đeo Tiền): located in Hoa Binh, Phu Tho, Son La, Tuyen Quang, Cao Bang, Bac Kan
- Khố Bạch
  - Dao Quần Trắng: located in Yen Bai, Lao Cai, Tuyen Quang, Ha Giang (known as Dao Họ in Yen Bai, Lao Cai)
- Làn Tiẻn
  - Dao Thanh Y: located in Tuyen Quang, Bac Giang, Quang Ninh
  - Dao Áo Dài (Dao Tuyển, Dao Chàm, Dao Slán Chỉ): located in Yen Bai, Lao Cai, Tuyen Quang, Ha Giang, Bac Kan

== Distribution ==
Yao peoples are distributed primarily in the provinces Hunan, Guangdong, Guangxi, Guizhou, and Yunnan of China. Ethnic Yao are also found in Vietnam, Laos, and Thailand.

=== In China ===
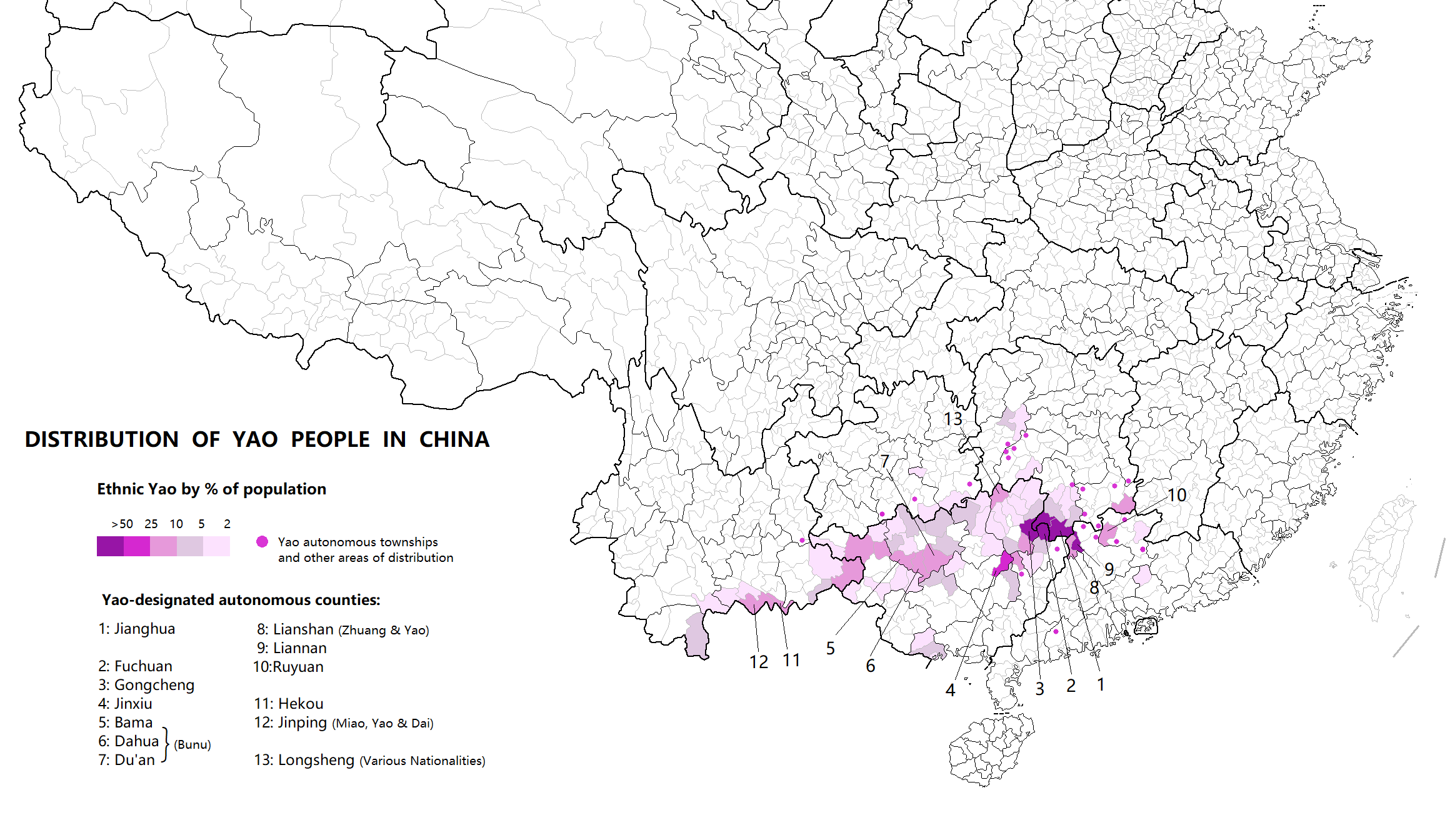
Distribution of ethnic Yao population in China, based on 2000 Chinese Census.

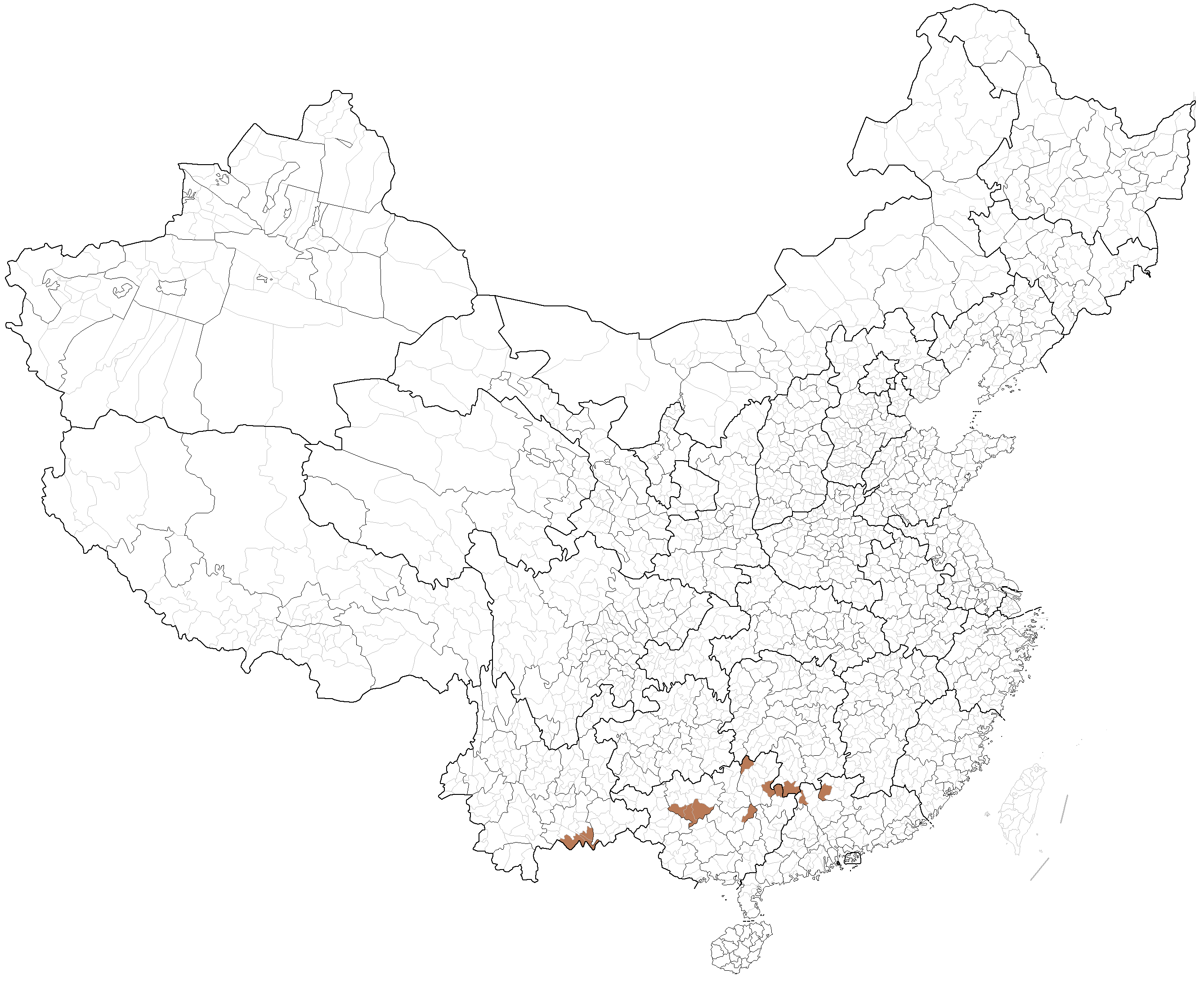
Yao autonomous prefectures and counties in China.

The Census of 2020 recorded 3,309,341 Yao in China.

Provincial Distribution of the Yao, from the 2020 census

Province-level division	Yao Population	% of China's Yao Population
Guangxi Zhuang Autonomous Region	1,683,038	50.86%
Hunan Province	749,872	22.66%
Guangdong Province	514,447	15.55%
Yunnan Province	218,825	6.61%
Guizhou Province	46,759	1.41%
Zhejiang Province	19,541	0.59%
Fujian Province	10,782	0.33%
Hainan Province	10,000	0.30%
Other	56,077	1.69%

==== Autonomous areas ====
Here is the list of autonomous areas designated for Yao people.

Province-level Division	Name
Hunan	Jianghua Yao Autonomous County
Guangdong	Liannan Yao Autonomous County
Guangdong	Ruyuan Yao Autonomous County
Guangdong	Lianshan Zhuang and Yao Autonomous County
Guangxi	Bama Yao Autonomous County
Guangxi	Dahua Yao Autonomous County
Guangxi	Du'an Yao Autonomous County
Guangxi	Fuchuan Yao Autonomous County
Guangxi	Gongcheng Yao Autonomous County
Guangxi	Jinxiu Yao Autonomous County
Guangxi	Longsheng Various Nationalities Autonomous County
Yunnan	Hekou Yao Autonomous County
Yunnan	Jinping Miao, Yao, and Dai Autonomous County

Yao ethnic townships and towns in China
Guangdong

Huizhou

- Lantian Yao Ethnic Township in Longmen County

Qingyuan

- Sanshui Yao Ethnic Township in Lianzhou
- Yao'an Yao Ethnic Township in Lianzhou
- Chengjia Yao Ethnic Township in Yangshan County

Shaoguan

- Shendushui Yao Ethnic Township in Shixing County

Zhaoqing

- Xiashuai Zhuang and Yao Ethnic Township in Huaiji County
Guangxi

Baise

- Chaoli Yao Ethnic Township in Lingyun County
- Lingzhan Yao Ethnic Township in Lingyun County
- Shali Yao Ethnic Township in Lingyun County
- Yuhong Yao Ethnic Township in Lingyun County
- Zuodeng Yao Ethnic Township in Tiandong County
- Badu Yao Ethnic Township in Tianlin County
- Bagui Yao Ethnic Township in Tianlin County
- Lizhou Yao Ethnic Township in Tianlin County
- Lucheng Yao Ethnic Township in Tianlin County
- Zubie Yao and Miao Ethnic Township in Xilin County
- Wangdian Yao Ethnic Township in Youjiang District

Fangchenggang

- Shiwanshan Yao Ethnic Township in Fangcheng District
- Nanping Yao Ethnic Township in Shangsi County

Guigang

- Guo'an Yao Ethnic Township in Pingnan County
- Malian Yao Ethnic Township in Pingnan County

Guilin

- Dongjing Yao Ethnic Township in Guanyang County
- Xishan Yao Ethnic Township in Guanyang County
- Dajing Yao Ethnic Township in Lingchuan County
- Lantian Yao Ethnic Township in Lingchuan County
- Huangsha Yao Ethnic Township in Lingui District
- Wantian Yao Ethnic Township in Lingui District
- Pulu Yao Ethnic Township in Lipu
- Dafa Yao Ethnic Township in Pingle County
- Dongshan Yao Ethnic Township in Quanzhou County
- Jiaojiang Yao Ethnic Township in Quanzhou County
- Huajiang Yao Ethnic Township in Xing'an County
- Hekou Yao Ethnic Township in Ziyuan County

Hechi

- Sannong Yao Ethnic Township in Donglan County
- Jiangzhou Yao Ethnic Township in Fengshan County
- Jinya Yao Ethnic Township in Fengshan County
- Pingle Yao Ethnic Township in Fengshan County
- Baxu Yao Ethnic Township in Nandan County
- Lihu Yao Ethnic Township in Nandan County
- Bala Yao Ethnic Township in Tian'e County
- Beiya Yao Ethnic Township in Yizhou District
- Fulong Yao Ethnic Township in Yizhou District

Hezhou

- Huangdong Yao Ethnic Township in Babu District
- Daping Yao Ethnic Township in Pinggui District
- Xianhui Yao Ethnic Township in Zhaoping County
- Huashan Yao Ethnic Township in Zhongshan County
- Liang'an Yao Ethnic Township in Zhongshan County

Liuzhou

- Tonglian Yao Ethnic Township in Rongshui Miao Autonomous County
- Gaoji Yao Ethnic Township in Sanjiang Dong Autonomous County

Nanning

- Guzhai Yao Ethnic Township in Mashan County
- Lidang Yao Ethnic Township in Mashan County
- Zhenxu Yao Ethnic Township in Shanglin County

Wuzhou

- Changping Yao Ethnic Township in Mengshan County
- Xiayi Yao Ethnic Township in Mengshan County
Guizhou

Qiandongnan Miao and Dong Autonomous Prefecture

- Cuili Yao and Zhuang Ethnic Township in Congjiang County
- Leidong Yao and Shui Ethnic Township in Liping County
- Shunhua Yao Ethnic Township in Liping County
- Tashi Yao and Shui Ethnic Township in Rongjiang County

Qiannan Buyei and Miao Autonomous Prefecture

- Yaoshan Yao Ethnic Township in Libo County

Qianxinan Buyei and Miao Autonomous Prefecture

- Youmai Yao Ethnic Township in Wangmo County
Hunan

Chenzhou

- Baohe Yao Ethnic Township in Beihu District
- Yangtianhu Yao Ethnic Township in Beihu District
- Baishui Yao Ethnic Township in Guiyang County
- Xishan Yao Ethnic Township in Linwu County
- Sanjiangkou Yao Ethnic Town in Rucheng County
- Wenming Yao Ethnic Township in Rucheng County
- Yanshou Yao Ethnic Township in Rucheng County
- Mangshan Yao Ethnic Township in Yizhang County
- Bamianshan Yao Ethnic Township in Zixing
- Huilongshan Yao Ethnic Township in Zixing

Hengyang

- Tashan Yao Ethnic Township in Changning

Huaihua

- Houtang Yao Ethnic Township in Chenxi County
- Luozishan Yao Ethnic Township in Chenxi County
- Shangpuxi Yao Ethnic Township in Chenxi County
- Sumuxi Yao Ethnic Township in Chenxi County
- Xianrenwan Yao Ethnic Township in Chenxi County
- Longchuantang Yao Ethnic Township in Hongjiang
- Haojiping Yao Ethnic Township in Zhongfang County

Shaoyang

- Changtang Yao Ethnic Township in Dongkou County
- Dawu Yao Ethnic Township in Dongkou County
- Nuoxi Yao Ethnic Township in Dongkou County
- Huxingshan Yao Ethnic Township in Longhui County
- Matang Miao and Yao Ethnic Township in Suining County
- Huangjin Yao Ethnic Township in Xinning County
- Malin Yao Ethnic Township in Xinning County

Yongzhou

- Hengling Yao Ethnic Township in Dao County
- Hongtangying Yao Ethnic Township in Dao County
- Shenzhangtang Yao Ethnic Township in Dao County
- Lanxi Yao Ethnic Township in Jiangyong County
- Qianjiadong Yao Ethnic Township in Jiangyong County
- Songbai Yao Ethnic Township in Jiangyong County
- Yuankou Yao Ethnic Township in Jiangyong County
- Daqiao Yao Ethnic Township in Lanshan County
- Huiyuan Yao Ethnic Township in Lanshan County
- Jiangdong Yao Ethnic Township in Lanshan County
- Jingzhu Yao Ethnic Township in Lanshan County
- Litou Yao Ethnic Township in Lanshan County
- Xiangjiangyuan Yao Ethnic Township in Lanshan County
- Jiuyishan Yao Ethnic Township in Ningyuan County
- Mianhuaping Yao Ethnic Township in Ningyuan County
- Tongmuluo Yao Ethnic Township in Ningyuan County
- Wulongshan Yao Ethnic Township in Ningyuan County
- Shaibeitan Yao Ethnic Township in Qiyang
- Shangwujiang Yao Ethnic Township in Shuangpai County
- Menlouxia Yao Ethnic Township in Xintian County

Zhuzhou

- Zhongcun Yao Ethnic Township in Yanling County

Former Yao townships

- Chuansu Yao Ethnic Township in Tongdao Dong Autonomous County, Huaihua
- Huashan Yao Ethnic Township in Guiyang County, Chenzhou
- Jingtang Yao Ethnic Township in Dao County, Yongzhou
- Lianmin Miao and Yao Ethnic Township in Suining County, Shaoyang
- Lingxiu Yao Ethnic Township in Rucheng County, Chenzhou
- Longzha Yao Ethnic Township in Yanling County, Zhuzhou
- Luguan Yao Ethnic Township in Ningyuan County, Yongzhou
- Mao'ao Yao Ethnic Township in Longhui County, Shaoyang
- Puzhu Yao Ethnic Township in Changning, Hengyang
- Qingxi Yao Ethnic Township in Jiangyong County, Yongzhou
- Xiaoyuan Yao Ethnic Town in Rucheng County, Chenzhou
- Yangliu Yao Ethnic Township in Guiyang County, Chenzhou
- Yingdong Yao Ethnic Township in Rucheng County, Chenzhou
- Yuefeng Yao Ethnic Township in Beihu District, Chenzhou
Yunnan

Qujing

- Gaoliang Zhuang, Miao and Yao Ethnic Township in Shizong County

Wenshan Zhuang and Miao Autonomous Prefecture

- Dongbo Yao Ethnic Township in Funing County
- Mengdong Yao Ethnic Township in Malipo County

Xishuangbanna Dai Autonomous Prefecture

- Yaoqu Yao Ethnic Township in Mengla County

==== By county ====
County-level distribution of the Yao, 2000 Chinese Census

(Only counties or county equivalents with more than 0.1% of county population are shown.)

County/City	Yao %	Yao	Total
Hunan Province	1.11	704,564	63,274,173
Dongkou County	1.55	11,639	752,581
Xinning County	2.59	14,438	557,120
Chenzhou City	1.63	70,513	4,324,812
Beihu District	1.25	3,921	314,477
Rucheng County	15.45	52,955	342,861
Zixing City	1.22	4,284	351,581
Yongzhou City	9.57	513,831	5,367,106
Shuangpai County	4.90	7,916	161,510
Dao County	5.92	36,938	624,199
Jiangyong County	62.39	147,164	235,893
Ningyuan County	2.16	15,943	738,259
Lanshan County	5.29	17,608	332,937
Xintian County	1.82	6,541	358,831
Jianghua Yao Autonomous County	61.87	270,889	437,835
Huaihua City	1.55	71,952	4,639,738
Zhongfang County	1.33	3,147	236,675
Chenxi County	6.77	32,405	478,708
Xupu County	3.18	25,398	798,983
Hongjiang City	1.47	7,137	485,061
Guangdong Province	0.24	202,667	85,225,007
Shaoguan City	1.13	31,042	2,735,433
Shixing County	2.00	4,115	205,684
Ruyuan Yao Autonomous County	10.75	19,121	177,894
Longmen County	2.51	6,726	267,949
Qingyuan City	3.05	96,043	3,146,713
Lianshan Zhuang and Yao Autonomous County	14.33	14,195	99,070
Liannan Yao Autonomous County	52.29	69,968	133,814
Lianzhou City	1.31	5,366	409,360
Guangxi Zhuang Autonomous Region	3.36	1,471,946	43,854,538
Xincheng District	1.30	5,560	426,346
Chengbei District	1.50	5,901	392,726
Shijiao District	1.15	2,949	256,730
Guilin City	8.15	375,902	4,614,670
Xiufeng District	1.63	2,050	125,924
Diecai District	1.72	2,312	134,401
Xiangshan District	1.42	3,527	249,135
Qixing District	1.76	4,003	227,278
Lingui County	3.53	14,957	424,182
Lingchuan County	3.20	10,169	318,036
Quanzhou County	4.29	27,984	652,963
Xing'an County	2.35	8,317	353,920
Yongfu County	3.48	8,202	235,368
Guanyang County	7.77	17,971	231,288
Longsheng Various Nationalities Autonomous County	17.56	28,237	160,796
Ziyuan County	3.19	5,014	156,946
Pingle County	14.08	55,553	394,575
Lipu County	7.48	25,893	346,169
Gongcheng Yao Autonomous County	58.60	158,937	271,216
Wuzhou City	1.15	32,021	2,796,087
Mengshan County	12.02	22,587	187,918
Fangchenggang City	4.63	34,074	735,952
Gangkou District	1.37	1,462	106,403
Fangcheng District	6.59	20,840	316,111
Shangsi County	4.22	8,666	205,307
Dongxing City	2.87	3,106	108,131
Guigang City	1.86	71,063	3,827,945
Pingnan County	6.29	66,391	1,055,782
Nanning City	1.43	68,975	4,839,536
Shanglin County	6.50	24,697	379,986
Mashan County	8.48	33,873	399,439
Liuzhou City	3.57	125,839	3,522,322
Heshan City	1.87	2,452	131,249
Luzhai County	2.01	8,424	418,665
Laibin County	1.25	10,475	839,790
Rong'an County	1.88	5,313	283,029
Sanjiang Dong Autonomous County	3.88	11,798	304,149
Rongshui Miao Autonomous County	6.48	27,560	425,608
Jinxiu Yao Autonomous County	37.45	50,532	134,934
Xincheng County	2.05	7,051	343,556
Hezhou Prefecture	12.49	241,822	1,936,849
Hezhou City	4.84	41,130	850,023
Zhaoping County	4.46	15,746	353,298
Zhongshan County	8.75	40241	460021
Fuchuan Yao Autonomous County	52.91	144,705	273,507
Baise Prefecture	3.82	127,351	3,332,096
Baise City	3.29	11,211	340,483
Tiandong County	4.63	16,674	360,123
Pingguo County	4.16	16,344	392,800
Debao County	1.84	5,085	276,335
Napo County	2.74	4,661	170,158
Lingyun County	21.05	36,954	175,573
Leye County	1.97	2,857	144,816
Tianlin County	11.64	27,559	236,799
Xilin County	3.54	4,934	139,282
Hechi Prefecture	9.93	349,819	3,523,693
Hechi City	2.31	7,355	318,348
Yizhou City	5.54	30,436	549,434
Luocheng Mulao Autonomous County	1.21	3,903	322,116
Huanjiang Maonan Autonomous County	5.36	17,807	332,067
Nandan County	9.18	29,284	318,844
Tian'e County	2.44	3,461	141,649
Fengshan County	7.71	12,714	164,807
Donglan County	4.29	10,581	246,715
Bama Yao Autonomous County	17.24	37,706	218,724
Du'an Yao Autonomous County	21.66	117,609	543,019
Dahua Yao Autonomous County	21.46	78,963	367,970
Guizhou Province	0.13	44,392	35,247,695
Liping County	1.10	5,046	458,533
Rongjiang County	1.70	5,101	300,369
Congjiang County	2.04	6,158	301,513
Majiang County	3.35	6,807	203,481
Libo County	3.45	5,915	171,366
Yunnan Province	0.45	190,610	42,360,089
Honghe Hani and Yi Autonomous Prefecture	1.86	76,947	4,130,463
Yuanyang County	2.18	7,922	362,950
Jinping Miao, Yao, and Dai Autonomous County	12.00	37,937	316,171
Lüchun County	3.46	6,968	201,256
Hekou Yao Autonomous County	22.10	21,097	95,451
Wenshan Zhuang and Miao Autonomous Prefecture	2.50	81,774	3,268,553
Malipo County	7.06	18,926	267,986
Guangnan County	2.16	15,781	730,376
Funing County	10.35	39,646	382,913
Jingdong Yi Autonomous County	1.15	4,063	352,089
Jiangcheng Hani and Yi Autonomous County	3.94	3,946	100,243
Xishuangbanna Dai Autonomous Prefecture	1.88	18,679	993,397
Mengla County	6.77	15,944	235,657

==== Guizhou ====
The Yao of Guizhou are found in the following locations (Guizhou Province Gazetteer 贵州志 2002).

- Libo County: townships of Yaoshan 瑶山, Yaolu 瑶麓, and Yao'ai 瑶埃
- Shiqian County (2,522 people): 9 Yao villages including Leijiatun 雷家屯 and Wurongguan 乌荣关 of Beita Township 北塔乡, and Shuiwei Village of Huaqiao Township 花桥乡水尾村
- Wangmo County: the 4 villages of Shangyoumai 上油迈, Xiaoyoumai 下油迈, Xinzhai 新寨, and Jiaxian 加现 in Youmai Township 油迈瑶族乡
- Majiang County: 23 Yao villages in Longshan Township 龙山乡, including Heba 河坝 (with 6,474 people)
- Liping County
  - Shunhua Township 顺化瑶族乡 (1,316 people in 1992): Gongcun 贡村, Gaoka 高卡, Yibuwan 已补晚, Yishu 已树; Gaozizhai of Gaoshu Village 高抒村高仔寨
  - Leidong Township 雷洞瑶族水族乡 (1,576 people in 1992): Jinchengzhai 金城寨 and Yibizhai 已毕寨 of Jincheng Village 金城村, Sanshanzhai of Xilao Village 戏劳村三山寨; Cenpangzhai 岑胖寨, Nongbozhai 弄播寨, Yunnanzhai 云南寨
- Congjiang County: 2 subgroups of Red Yao 红瑶 and Pan Yao 盘瑶
  - Red Yao 红瑶
    - Cuili Township 翠里瑶族壮族乡: Gaomang 高忙, Xinzhai 新寨, Shujiawan 舒家湾, Wucai 乌菜, Jiage 架格, Baiyanchong 白岩冲, Raojia 饶家
    - Jiabang Township 加榜乡: Dazhou 达州村
  - Pan Yao 盘瑶
    - Xishan Township 西山镇: Cengang 岑杠, Gaojiao 高脚, Qiuka 秋卡
    - Douli Township 斗里乡: Dengmian 登面, Changka 长卡, Gaoliu 高柳, Beitong 碑痛
    - Xiutang Township 秀塘壮族乡: Dage 打格, Yusha 雨沙, Jiujia 九甲, Baidao 摆倒, Wubu 乌布, Xilin 细林
    - Zaibian Township 宰便镇: Zezhui 怎追
    - Xiajiang Township 下江镇: Huanglang 黄郎
    - Yongli Township 拥里乡: Dashan 大山, Laozhai 老寨, Gangbian 刚边, Huangnijing 黄泥井
    - Donglang Township 东郎乡: Baidui 摆堆
- Rongjiang County
  - Tashi Township 塔石瑶族水族乡 (2,979 people): Zedong 怎东村, Zaiyong 宰勇村, Dangxiang 党相村, Tashi 塔石村, Dangdiao 党调村, Zeba 怎贝村, Qiaoyang 乔央村.
  - Pingjiang Township 平江乡: Jijiaoba 鸡脚坝, Balu 巴鲁
  - Pingyong Township 平永镇: Sanbuqiao 三步桥, Qiaohai 乔亥
  - Sanjiang Township 三江乡: Wuhong 乌洪
  - Liangwang Township 两汪乡: Cen'ao 岑熬
  - Pingyou Township 平尤乡: Shuangxikou 双溪口, Bakai 八开
- Leishan County
  - Dadi Township 达地镇: Longtanggou 龙塘沟, Paisong 排松, Pingzhai 平寨, Laozhai 老寨, Beilue 背略, Pangjia 庞家, Jieli 皆力, Gaolue 高略, Tongwu 同乌, Yeliao 也辽, Xiaowu 小巫, Baimizhai 白米寨, Hebian 河边
  - Liuwu Township 柳乌乡: Liuwu 柳乌
  - Qiaosang Township 乔桑乡: Xiagaojian 下高枧
  - Gulu Township 固鲁乡: Nanping 南屏
- Danzhai County: Pailu 排路, Yangwu 杨武, Jiapei 加配
- Jianhe County: Zhandi Village, Taiyong Township 太拥乡展迪村
- Sandu County: Wuxia 巫不, Pu'an 普安, Jiaxiong 甲雄, Shangjiang 上江, Niuchang 牛场
- Luodian County: Ankang 安抗 of Luotuo 罗妥; Naji 纳吉, Nakao 纳考, Nanao 纳闹, Luoyang 罗羊, Longping 龙坪, Bianyang 边阳 of Fengting 风亭
- Ziyun County (297 people): Tangguan Village, Maoping Township 茅坪塘贯村
- Guanling County (189 people)

The Yao of Guizhou have various autonyms, such as:

- toŋ55 mo55 (董蒙), in Yaoshan 瑶山, Libo County. The Buyi people call them ʑou21.
- nu55 hou33 (努侯), in Yaolu 瑶麓, Libo County. The Shui people call them miou35 lo55.
- tuŋ33 muŋ33 (东蒙), in Yao'ai 瑶埃, Libo County. The Buyi people call them ʑou21.
- maŋ55 (满), in Youmai 油迈, Wangmo County.
- ʑoŋ21 min21 (容棉), in Rongjiang, Leishan, Danzhai, Jianhe, Congjiang, and Sandu Counties.

==== Hunan ====
The Jianghua Yao Autonomous County is the only Yao-designated autonomous county in Hunan. Some subgroups of ethnic Yao in Hunan include:

- Pan Yao 盘瑶 (Mian 勉): in Jianghua, Chenxian, Lanshan, Ningyuan, Daoxian, Guiyang, Lingling, Chengbu, Chenxi, Xinning; speak a Mienic language.
- Guoshan Yao 过山瑶: in Jianghua, Lanshan, Ningyuan; speak a Mienic language.
- Huajiao Yao 花脚瑶 (Wunai 唔奈): in Longhui, Tongdao, Xupu, Chenxi; speak a Hmongic language.
- Badong Yao 八峒瑶 (Batong Yao 八垌瑶): in Xinning. The Badong Yao speak an endangered Sinitic language. It is spoken in the villages of Huangyandong 黄岩峒, Malindong 麻林峒, and Dazhendong 大圳峒 in Huangjin Ethnic Yao Township 黄金瑶族乡, Xinning County.
- Pingdi Yao 平地瑶 (Bingduoyou 炳多尤): in Jianghua, Jiangyong, and speak a Chinese dialect.
- Qixing Yao 七姓瑶: in Chenxi, and speak a Chinese dialect.

The Hunan Province Gazetteer (1997) gives the following autonyms for various peoples classified by the Chinese government as Yao.

- ju21 mien21 尤棉: in much of Xiangxi Prefecture
- tom21pen21 ju21 董本尤: in Xintian County, Yizhang County, Changning County
- ku21goŋ55 ju21 谷岗尤: in Lanshan County, Jianghua County
- thou21 ju21 土尤
- dzau21 min21 藻敏: in Shuangpai County, Dao County, Ningyuan County
- Donglixiao 洞里销: in Xinning County; also called Bunu 布努, Donglixiao 峒里俏, or Dong Yao 峒瑶 (Xinning County Gazetteer 2009). Their language is called Donghua 峒话.
- mm21 nai33 唔奈: in Longhui County, Xupu County
- piŋ21 toa52 jeu21 炳多尤 (also called Dainaijiang 代奈江): in Jianghua County, Jiangyong County

Tan Xiaoping (2012) also gives the following autonyms for Yao subgroups of Jiangyong County.

- mjəŋ31 勉
- jəu31 mjən31 优勉
- i31 mjəŋ31 壹勉
- iou231 ȵie231 优尼
- piu42tau42 iou42 炳多优

The Yao of Shaoyang Prefecture are found in the following locations (Shaoyang Prefecture Gazetteer 1997). Population statistics are from 1990.

- Xinning County (12,756 Yao persons): Malin 麻林乡, Huangjin 黄金乡, Jingwei 靖位乡 (in Yuanshui 源水瑶族村)
- Dongkou County (8,473 Yao persons): Naxi 𦰡溪乡 (那溪乡), Changtang 长塘乡, Dawu 大屋乡; Yuexi 月溪, Zhaping 渣坪, Tongshan 桐山
- Longhui County (6,151 Yao persons): Huxingshan 虎形山乡, Mao'ao 茅坳乡, Xiaoshajiang 小沙江镇, Qingshan 青山, Matangshan 麻塘山
- Chengbu County (2,276 Yao persons): Lanrong 兰蓉, Qingyuan 清源, Dayang 大阳, Tingping 汀坪, Pengdong 蓬洞, Yangmei 杨梅
- Suining County (1,641 Yao persons): Jinta 金趿, Shuikou 水口

The Shaoyang Prefecture Gazetteer (1997) reports that the Yao of Shaoyang Prefecture, Hunan speak the following languages.

- Mienic languages
  - Longhui County 隆回: Huxingshan 虎形山, Mao'ao 茅坳, Xiaoshajiang 小沙江
  - Dongkou County 洞口: Dawu 大屋, Changtang 长塘
  - Chengbu County 城步: Qingyuan 清源, Lanrong 兰蓉
- Hmongic languages?: Huangjin 黄金 and Malin 麻林 of Xinning County
- Southern Dong dialect: Naxi 𦰡溪 (那溪), Dongkou County and Lianmin 联民, Suining County

The following population statistics of ethnic Yao in Hunan are from the 1990 Chinese census, as given in the Hunan Province Gazetteer (1997).

Population of ethnic Yao in Hunan
County	Population (1990)
Jianghua	210,944
Jiangyong	62,647
Dao	26,771
Ningyuan	16,361
Lanshan	16,123
Shuangpai	7,206
Xintian	6,295
Qiyang	3,209
Chenxi	26,132
Xupu	13,989
Qianyang	3,264
Huaihua	2,066
Tongdao	1,657
Xinning	12,756
Dongkou	8,473
Longhui	6,151
Chenzhou	5,872
Yizhang	4,145
Zixing	3,999
Guiyang	2,323
Changning	1,085
Total	460,667

== Written languages ==
After 1982, the Guangxi Nationality Institute and the Chinese Academy of Social Sciences together created a new Yao writing system which was unified with the research results of the Yao-American scholar Yuēsè Hòu (Traditional Chinese: 約瑟·候/Simplified Chinese: 约瑟·候). The writing system was finalized in 1984 in Ruyuan County (乳源瑤族自治縣), Guangdong, which included Chinese professors Pan Chengqian (盤承乾/盘承乾), Deng Fanggui (鄧方貴/邓方贵), Liu Baoyuan (劉保元/刘保元), Su Defu (蘇德富/苏德富) and Yauz Mengh Borngh; Chinese government officials; Mien Americans Sengfo Chao (Zhao Fuming), Kao Chiem Chao (Zhao Youcai), and Chua Meng Chao; David T. Lee.

American linguist Herbert C. Purnell developed a curriculum and workshop presentations on language learning in East and Southeast Asia, as well as Yao Seng Deng from Thailand. The US delegation took the new writing system to the Iu Mien community in the United States where it was adopted with a vote of 78 to 7 by a conference of Mien American community leaders. This writing system, based on the Latin alphabet was designed to be pan-dialectal; it distinguishes 30 syllable initials, 121 syllable finals and eight tones.

For an example of how the unified alphabet is used to write Iu Mien, a common Yao language, see Iu Mien language.

There is a separate written standard for Bunu, since it is from the Hmong/Miao side, rather than the Mien/Yao side, of the Miao–Yao language family.

Some people think that a variety of Yao is, or was, written in Nüshu, an indigenous script in the southern part of Hunan Province in China. But this connection between Yao language and Nüshu is disputed, because Nüshuin a more likely recorded local Chinese dialect, which might also be known by Yao people in Hunan.

Officially, illiteracy and semi-literacy among the Yao in China still stood at 40.6% in 2002.

== Notable people ==
- Empress Ji, imperial consort of the Ming dynasty (14??-1475), mother of the Hongzhi Emperor
- Lei Yingchuan (1957-1979), soldier
- Wang Yungui (born 1992), entrepreneur and businesswoman

== See also ==
- Dance of the Yao people
- Panhu

== Sources ==
- AsiaHarvest.org: Ethnic group profiles of China
- Forbes, Andrew, and Henley, David, 'Chiang Mai's Hill Peoples' in: Ancient Chiang Mai Volume 3. Chiang Mai, Cognoscenti Books, 2012. ASIN: B006IN1RNW
- Máo Zōngwǔ 毛宗武: Yáozú Miǎnyǔ fāngyán yánjiū 瑶族勉语方言研究 (Studies in Mien dialects of the Miao nationality; Běijīng 北京,Publishing House of Minority Nationalities 2004), ISBN 7-105-06669-5.
- Méng Cháojí 蒙朝吉: Hàn-Yáo cídiǎn – Bùnǔyǔ 汉瑶词典——布努语 (Chinese-Yao Dictionary – Bunu; Chéngdū 成都, Sìchuān mínzú chūbǎnshè 四川民族出版社 1996), ISBN 7-5409-1745-8.
- Minahan, James (2016), Encyclopedia of Stateless Nations, Greenwood
- Barker, Judith C., and Saechao, Kaochoy. "A Household Survey of Older Iu-Mien Refugees in Rural California." Journal of Cross-Cultural Gerontology 12.2 (1997): 121–143.
- Barker, Judith C. & Saechao, Kaochoy. (2000). A demographic survey of Iu-Mien in West Coast States of the U.S., 1993. Journal of Immigrant Health, 2:1, 31–42.
- Phan Ngọc Khuê. 2003. Lễ cấp sắc của người Dao Lô Gang ở Lạng Sơn. Hà Nội: Nhà xuất bản văn hóa thông tin.
- West, Barbara A. (2009), Encyclopedia of the Peoples of Asia and Oceania

=== Films ===
- 2003 – Death of a Shaman. Directed by Richard Hall; produced by Fahm Fong Saeyang.
- 1989 – "Moving Mountains: The Story of the Yiu Mien". Directed and produced by Elaine Velazquez
