= Li Tao (general) =

General in the People's Liberation Army (1905–1970)

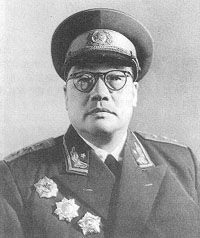
- Native name: 李涛
- Born: 4 September 1905; Rucheng County, Hunan, Qing China
- Died: 20 December 1970 (aged 65) Guangzhou, Guangdong, China
- Allegiance: People's Republic of China
- Branch: People's Liberation Army Ground Force
- Service years: 1926–1965
- Rank: General
- Conflicts: Chinese Civil War; Second Sino-Japanese War

Li Tao (Chinese: 李涛; pinyin: Lǐ Tāo; 4 September 1905 – 20 December 1970) was a Chinese general in the People's Liberation Army of Yao ethnicity. A member of the Chinese Communist Party (CCP) since 1926, he took part in key revolutionary events such as the Autumn Harvest Uprising and the Long March. Li served as a political commissar in the Chinese Red Army and held roles in the Eighth Route Army during the Second Sino-Japanese War. After 1949, he was minister of the Central Military Commission's Operations Department and became a general in 1955.

== Early life ==
Li Tao was born in 1905 in Rucheng County, Hunan. In 1923, he studied at Chenzhou No. 7 United High School and joined patriotic student movements. He became a member of the Chinese Communist Party (CCP) in 1926. After studying at the Hunan Political Institute in Hengyang, he worked as a propagandist in the National Revolutionary Army. Later, he returned to Rucheng County to lead workers' movements, becoming chairman of the Rucheng County General Trade Union and captain of the workers' picket team. He also briefly joined the Kuomintang.

== Military career ==
In 1927, Li participated in the Autumn Harvest Uprising in Guidong as a party representative in the Chinese Workers' and Peasants' Revolutionary Army. After the uprising failed, he worked secretly for the CCP in Guangdong and Hong Kong. In 1929, he joined the Chinese Red Army in the Jiangxi Soviet, serving in various roles, including political commissar and propaganda chief. In 1930, he became political commissar of the Red Army's 7th Division. During the first encirclement campaign against the Jiangxi Soviet by the Nationalists, he led the 7th Division and helped defeat the Nationalist Army's 18th Division, capturing its commander Zhang Huizan. In 1932, Li was political commissar of the Red Army's 39th Division and fought in the Nanxiong-Shuikou Campaign in Jiangxi. He supported Mao Zedong’s strategies, which led to his reassignment as propaganda chief of the Red Army's General Political Department. In 1933, he served as director of the Red First Army's political department and political commissar of the Red Ninth Corps.

In 1934, Li took part in the Long March, holding key roles such as head of the Red Army Work Department and commander of the Military Commission's vanguard team. After arriving in Shaanxi in 1935, he served in the Northwest Revolutionary Military Committee and as deputy director of the Red 74th Division. In 1937, he became head of the Eighth Route Army’s Xi’an office.

=== World War II and second-half of the Chinese Civil War ===
During the Second Sino-Japanese War, Li worked as head of the Eighth Route Army's Wuhan office, focusing on united front efforts with the Nationalists. In 1938, he conducted liaison work with various Nationalist armies. In 1939, he taught at the Nanyue Guerrilla Cadre Training School in Hengyang. In 1940, he worked at the Eighth Route Army's Guilin office. In 1941, he returned to Yan’an, serving as minister of the Central Military Commission’s Economic Construction Department and secretary-general. In 1942, he became deputy director of the Military Commission’s Operations Department and later acting director of the Operations Bureau.

During the second-half of the Chinese Civil War from 1945 to 1949, Li was acting minister of the Military Commission’s Operations Department. He played a key role in planning major campaigns, drafting documents, collecting data, and reporting on battles, emphasizing efficient and high-quality work.

=== Post war ===
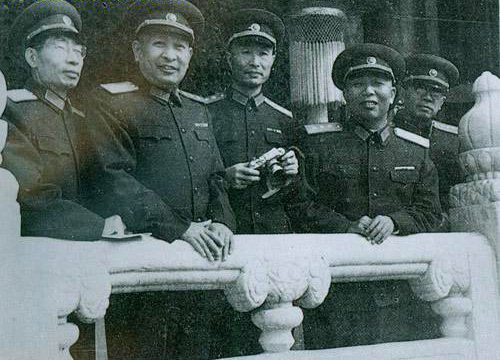
Li Tao (far right) with other generals on the Tiananmen Gate Tower (1961)

After the founding of the People’s Republic of China in 1949, Li continued as minister of the Military Commission’s Operations Department. In 1950, he became principal of the Central Military Commission’s Cryptography Engineering School and helped establish the PLA Surveying and Mapping School. He also contributed to writing military regulations for infantry, internal affairs, and discipline. In 1952, Li was appointed minister of the Technical Department (later the General Staff’s Third Department). In 1955, he was awarded the rank of general. In 1959, he became political commissar of the Third Department, promoting the integration of political and technical work and setting high standards for technical staff.

Li served as an alternate member of the 8th Central Committee of the Chinese Communist Party, a member of the Central Supervisory Committee, and a member of the Third National Defense Committee. In 1965, he retired due to illness. In 1969, he was persecuted during the Cultural Revolution and was relocated to Guangzhou for “war preparedness.” He died in Guangzhou on 20 December 1970, at the age of 65.

== Family ==
Li was married thrice and had a son and daughter.

== Awards and decorations ==
- August 1 Medal (First class)
- Order of Independence and Freedom (First class)
- Order of Liberation (First class)
