= Taisu Zhang =

Legal scholar

- 张泰苏
- Education: Yale University (BA, PhD, JD)
- Occupation: Legal scholar
- Employer: Yale Law School

Taisu Zhang (born 1982) is a scholar of comparative law, legal history, private law theory, and Chinese law and politics. He is a professor of law at Yale Law School.

== Education ==
Zhang holds a BA in history and mathematics (2005) and PhD in history (2014) from Yale University and a JD from Yale Law School (2008).

== Academic career ==
Zhang is the author of two books, The Ideological Foundations of Qing Taxation: Belief Systems, Politics, and Institutions (Cambridge University Press, 2023), which won the 2024 Allan Sharlin Memorial Award from the Social Science History Association, and The Laws and Economics of Confucianism: Kinship and Property in Pre-Industrial China and England (Cambridge University Press, 2017), which won the 2018 Presidents Book Award from the Social Science History Association and the Gaddis Smith International Book Prize from the Macmillan Center at Yale University.

Zhang is a co-editor of the Studies in Legal History book series at Cambridge University Press, the flagship series of the American Society for Legal History. He was an associate professor at Duke University School of Law between 2014 and 2016. He holds an honorary position as a Global Faculty member at the Peking University Law School.

== Family ==
Zhang is the son of Zhang Xianglong (1949–2022), formerly a professor of philosophy and religion at Peking University and a renowned scholar of Confucian philosophy. He is a great-grandson of the National Revolutionary Army general Zhang Huizan (1884–1931).

== Publications ==
=== Books ===
- The Ideological Foundations of Qing Taxation: Belief Systems, Politics, and Institutions, Cambridge University Press, 2023
- The Laws and Economics of Confucianism: Kinship and Property in Pre-Industrial China and England, Cambridge University Press, 2017

=== Selected Articles ===
- Does Legality Produce Political Legitimacy? An Experimental Approach (with Yiqing Xu and Yiqin Fu), Journal of Legal Studies (forthcoming, 2025)
- The Modern State and the Rise of the Business Corporation (with John Morley), Yale Law Journal (2023)
- Legal Internalism in Modern Histories of Copyright (with Shyamkrishna Balganesh), Harvard Law Review (2021)
- Beyond Information Costs: Preference Formation and the Architecture of Property Law, Journal of Legal Analysis (2020)
- China’s Turn Toward Law (with Tom Ginsburg), Virginia Journal of International Law (2019)
- Cultural Paradigms in Property Institutions, The Yale Journal of International Law (2016)
- Social Hierarchies and the Formation of Customary Property Law in Pre-Industrial China and England, American Journal of Comparative Law (2014)
