= Iu Mien people =

Subset of the Yao people

Iu Mien People
Total population
- China: 2,172,000 Vietnam: 350,000 Thailand: 40,000 Laos: 20,250 United States: 60,000 France: 2,000

Languages
- Iu Mien

Religion
- Taoism, Yao folk religion, Buddhism, Christianity

Related ethnic groups
- Hmong people

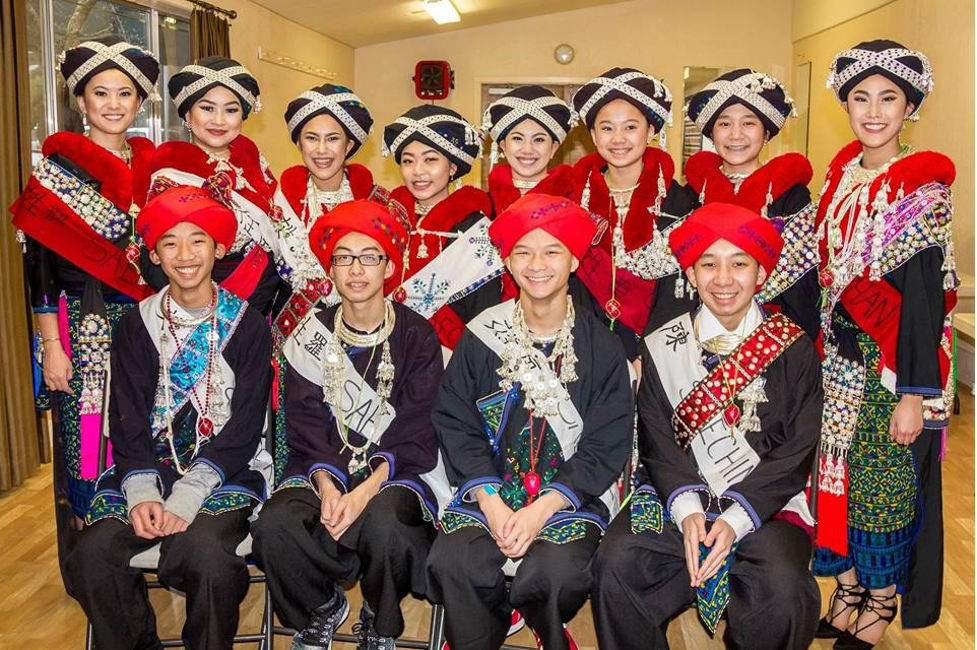
Iu Mien American youths celebrating Lunar New Year

The Iu Mien people (pinyin: Iu Mienh) are a subgroup of the Yao people, which is the largest of the three major Yao groups according to the Nationalities Affairs Commission of Guangxi Zhuang Autonomous Region in China. The Iu Mien language is categorized as belonging to the Mien language family. Iu Mien populations can be found in Southern China (Hunan, Guangxi, Guizhou, Guangdong, Yunnan), Vietnam, Laos, Thailand, Burma, the United States, France, and other Western nations.

== Classification ==
The origin word is derived from the Chinese language as 瑤人. In China, the Chinese pronunciation is Yao. In Vietnam, the Vietnamese language pronounces or sounds out the term as Dao. The Iu Mien, along with other subgroups classified as Yao, do not refer to themselves as "Yao." The Iu Mien often refer to themselves as Iu Mien or Mien.

In the early 21st century, Thai and Lao governments started to classify people as Iu Mien. With regard to nationality or ethnicity, the Iu Mien are officially classified in China and most of Southeast Asia as a subgroup of the Yao ethnicity.

The Yao consists of three major groups: Pan Yao, Bunu Yao, and Pingdi Yao. The Pan Yao group is the largest in China and Southeast Asia, with Iu Mien Americans belonging to this Pan Yao group.

The Yao Nationality was officially recognized by the Chinese government in the 1950s. The Yao or Yaozu people were officially recognized as one of the fifty-four nationalities in China.

== Early history ==
Around 300 CE, migrations of Han Chinese into Southern China led to significant cultural changes. Among these were closer relations with non-Han ethnic groups such as the Yao (Mien). During this time, the Yao (Mien) began adopting Chinese surnames. The social structure underwent a transformation, giving rise to a landowning aristocracy. These migrations accelerated during the middle of the 6th century, when Yao migrants settled in the mountain ranges of Nanlingshan, which intersects the present-day Hunan, Guangxi, and Guangdong provinces.

For centuries, the relationship between the Yao and the state was marked by frequent episodes of conflict. The Houhanshu (Book of the Later Han) referred to Southern non-Sinitic groups as Yiren, and documented many rebellions associated with Southern tribes. Tensions between the Yao and the state increased during the later Han period. The pressure to assimilate culturally or economically led to many tribes migrating to higher elevations and distance themselves as much as possible from the state.

Han migrations to the south coincided with, and may have catalyzed, the emergence of the Yao as a distinct ethnic group and culture. This change is reflected in the use of the term Moyao in state records during the Tang dynasty (618–906). The introduction of the term Moyao was significant in ancient Yao history and their ethnic identity, as it marked the identification of a Yao ethnic group.

Ancient Chinese texts such as the Liangshu and the Suishu used Moyao to designate a specific people, indicating that the state had gained more knowledge about the various tribal groups in the southern provinces. Chinese poets Du Fu and Liu Yuxi wrote about the Moyao inhabiting the mountains during the eighth and ninth centuries, respectively, while a Tang monk complained about their practice of slash-and-burn agriculture. These sources consistently describe the Moyao as the descendants of Panhu and residing in the Jing region (Chu), which covers present-day Hunan province.

During the Song dynasty (960–1279), more information about the Yao (Mien) became available, although variations of their name existed such as Yaoren, Yaoman, and Manyao. Several sources used the term Yaoren to refer to the Yao people, some to denote geographical administrative zones and others to describe a specific group. For example, in a passage from the Songshi (History of the Song), the state reported illegal sales of salt by the Yaoren. The passage used a negative dog marker for Yaoren and provided context that it was used to identify a geographical domain earmarked for taxation and forced labor.

=== Rebellion ===
Around the turn of the 11th century, the Yao were mostly governed by hereditary headmen or chieftains who submitted to the authority of the Chinese state. Rebellion frequented; from the Song dynasty through the Qing dynasty (1644–1912), there was significant tension between the Yao and the state. Numerous rebellions were documented in official records, indicating continuous uncertainty in Yao-occupied territories.

Prior to the Qing dynasty, there were several instances of Yao rebellions. For instance, during the reign of Song Emperor Renzong (1023–1064), official records documented three uprisings: one in Guangdong in 1035, another in Hunan in 1043, and a third in the Guangzhou region in 1281. Between 1316 and 1331, the Yao launched over forty uprisings against the Yuan dynasty (Mongol). The Ming dynasty (1368–1644) also faced unrest and was forced to suppress a century-long Yao revolt that began in 1371. The hostilities only abated after three imperial armies were deployed.

In 1832, a large-scale rebellion, known as the Yao Rebellion, erupted among the Yao people in the border regions of Hunan, Guangxi, and Guangdong, which had significant implications for the Qing dynasty. Due to corruption of local triads and valuable resources such as salt being cut off, Yao leaders organized thousands of combatants. The rebellion ultimately led to a resolution involving concessions and agreements from both sides.

Before the Tang dynasty, and possibly even earlier, references made to the Yao (Mien) included the Miao and other Southern groups. The terms "Man" (barbarians), "Nanman" (southern barbarians), "Jingman" (Chu barbarians), and "Yiren" (uplanders) are general classifications that encompassed various groups. However, as the Tang asserted its authority with the Mandate of Heaven, the term "Yao" began to take on more specific meanings, such as Moyao, Yaoren, Yaoman, and Manyao.

Moyao originated from an earlier term that referred to people in the Jing region (Chu), in present-day Hunan, who were believed to be descended from Panhu. This was a mythical dog-warrior from the Panhu myth that many Yao (Mien) believe to be their forebear. The Tang officials responsible for collecting information on the periphery's peoples may have found it convenient to perpetuate this notion. In any case, the people thought to be Panhu's descendants eventually became known as the Moyao, and later the Yao.

Iu Mien History consists of three levels:

- The first: upper age (zaangc yunh zaapc -zaangv) consisted of 3,864 years of the life cycle.
- The second: middle age (zong yunh zaapc-zaangv) consisted of 1,800 years of the life cycle.
- The third level lower age (haac-yunh zaapc-zaangv) consisted of 120 years of the life cycle.

Today's world (mouh-gitv ninh gen) consists of 60 years of the life cycle. The Iu Mien considers 60 years as one generation of life. No record was documented in the three levels of the life cycle where Iu Mien lived.

The Iu Mien believe the beginning of their civilization started with King Pan or Bienh Hungh. They believed he created the universe, earth, sky, and human beings, the creator of the world.

==== Yong Ziuh and Ming administrations ====
In the year 1262, one document revealed that Iu Mien lived in the south and north of Hue Nan Hue Peic territories near the Zu Jaang and Hu Jaang river banks where they were farming. These territories are also called: namh-ging ziepc bouv-dinc, which means the southern part of China for 800 years. The Yongh Ziuh administration forced the Iu Mien to relocate to an isolated region of the forest to build their own temples and to continue practicing the King's worship for 70 years. Yongh Ziuh still allowed the Iu Mien to claim their own Kingdom through King Pan/Bienh Hungh during the Mongol era (洪武). Yongh Ziuh came to power for 8 generations and conquered China for many years.

Later, the Yongh government was weakening. The three Ming generals uprising against Yongh's governments lasted several years. Then Yongh's government surrendered and the Mongols' system collapsed. There were many cities and provincial officials removed from power. The Ming (明朝)system and government came to power for 17 generations.

The Ming era was the most aggressive toward the Iu Mien people. Ming sent troops to chase and hunt down thousands of Iu Mien high-ranking officials and civilians. Iu Mien people were almost extinct from civilization. Iu Mien people called and proposed Hm-geh baeng-maax to rescue them from the Ming genocide. After proposing to Hm-geh baeng-maax, (powerful spirit god) Iu Mien troops gained power and were able to kill thousands of Ming troops, which made the Ming government open peace negotiations with the Iu Mien.

As a result of the negotiation, the Ming government no longer allowed King Pan/Bienh Hungh to have his own kingdom, build their temples and continue the kingship role. The passport traveling in the hills/passport to travel across the mountain (jiex-sen borngv) was drafted and adopted. All lowlands that can be irrigated water for farming belonged to the Chinese. The foothills and highlands that no longer can be irrigated water for farming belonged to Iu Mien. Religious practice was created. The three celestial posters were created for Iu Mien of 12 clans to carry to worship in the mountains to mountains. Since the Ming era, the Iu Mien lost their kingdom, temples, and territory completely to China.

==== Drought and migration ====
In the year of Jaapc-yienh yietc maux, there was a drought for three consecutive years, and no food, and starvation severely impacted society. Iu Mien people saw further south across Sea/River lightning and thunderstrike signals to the Iu Mien in the hope that there would be rain. Iu Mien people searched for new land or forest land territories for farming. All 12 clans of Iu Mien held a meeting and discussed how to move to the new land. They went to Cing Jaang river bank to cut trees to build boats to cross rivers/seas. Twelve clans and twelve boats were built to travel across the rivers/sea, but the boats were stuck in the big wind storm for three months and could not reach the other side of the river/sea. The boats no longer moved on the horizon of the water. They heard strange sounds as a waterfall of the clips, and some said it was thunder. The others said the waterfall off into the ocean sinkhole. The Iu Mien leaders and crew members came up with a worship spirit god called lingh zioz bouz meuh to rescue Iu Mien to reach the other side of the sea/river. The three leaders Bienh liemh feix lorngh, Dangc yungz nyeic lorngc, and Zeuz feix faqc zang to lead the affair/journey. After worshiping and calling the spirit god to rescue them about three days later, the boats were moved to reach the shore of today's Guangdong province. From there, Iu Mien spread out to Guangv xi, Yunz Namh, Guiz Zio, then to Vietnam, and later to Laos, and Thailand.

The Iu Mien people were the first civilization in China according to the chanting song story, Iu Mien Elders, a shaman's worship book written by Iu Mien elders in ancient Chinese characters. The Iu Mien nation was located in the southern part of China today known as Guangdong, Guangxi, and Hunan provinces and was ruled by the king of the Iu Mien people.

==== Defeat of King Pan ====
The last Iu Mien King was King Pan, the namesake of the modern Iu Mien surnames Phan, Saephanh, Saepharn, Phanh, Phan, Pan, Pharn, etc. King Pan and the Chinese emperor declared war against each other 1,000 years ago over disputed territory. Iu Mien, led by King Pan, were fighting to protect their people and their territory. King Pan and Iu Mien suffered tremendous losses. King Pan lost countless soldiers and civilian casualties as well as territory to the Chinese emperor. The Chinese emperor captured most of the Iu Mien's territory. Iu Mien and King Pan were unable to fight due to being outnumbered by soldiers and weapons, which forced King Pan to negotiate with the Chinese emperor. The Chinese emperor gave two options to King Pan and Iu Mien people: 1) Surrender to the Chinese emperor and sign a treaty to give all territorial land to the Chinese emperor, or 2) King Pan could continue to fight, but the Chinese would wipe out Iu Mien society in a short period.

King Pan and his government chose to give up all territories to China and signed the treaty called “Passport to travel in the hill” or “Passport to cross the mountain.” This document contained relevant information. The Chinese emperor had written this document in Chinese characters.

“Iu Mien people have rights to maintain their identity, language, culture, and worship system and live on the hillside or in the mountain to cultivate the land for farming and crops and raise their family. The Iu Mien would not be allowed to form their own government and have no rights to pursue their own nation. Iu Mien, who possesses this document, has the legal rights to cross any territories/ borders to settle and to build their village in the hill/mountain to make a living by farming without delay by any regional governments. The governments of that country are responsible for their wellbeing and educating them to follow the rules of laws of the country that Iu Mien are living in.”

After losing their nation, the 12 existing clans of the Iu Mien people had to separate into small villages due to the mountainous area and foothill land. Each village consisted of 15 to 20 families. The majority of people in each village were related. In some cases, they kept their clan together. Their farming lifestyle was slash-and-burn to clear the grass and trees and to fertilize crops. Hunting and fishing were their primary career for men to provide food for their families. They hunt many different kinds of wild animals ranging from birds, squirrels, monkeys, deer, and wild buffalo, to elephants. Iu Mien women's primary role is to take care of household chores and feed animals. Iu Mien's written language is similar to Chinese characters which are for religion and chants only songs. No written language for daily speaking.

Every five to ten years, the mountain where the Iu Mien people lived and farmed would no longer be able to grow crops because the slash-and-burn process destroys the proper elements of soils needed to grow crops in the region. They had to move to a new place and location in the deep tropical forest to start a new life and a new village all over again. Iu Mien people were scattered all over the mountains in China. The mountains where they lived became deserts because of the slash and burn to farm. They looked for new places such as other mountainous areas to build new villages. They had to search further south and eventually moved into Vietnam.

== 20th century ==
The migration of the Iu Mien to Laos and Thailand consisted of various tribes that had relocated to Yunnan in the 15th century. For the Mien, as well as other highland communities that migrated to Southeast Asia, their journey involved crossing mountains rather than national borders. Again, Iu Mien migrated in the 1600s according to the first wave of Iu Mien migration and recorded in the Iu Mien Ancestor burial book, not late 1800s. In the late 1800s and early 1900s, the boundaries between China, Vietnam, and Laos were not clearly delineated as they are today. "For those who changed this article, please keep focus on the Iu Mien tribe, not other tribes. Other tribes leave it for their research"

=== In Southeast Asia ===
==== In Vietnam ====
No known records indicate what year the Iu Mien entered Vietnam due to a fear of persecution by the Chinese emperor. Slash and burn used throughout mountainous regions in China led to a drought, causing the Iu Mien people to migrate to Vietnam, gradually into the province called “Moung Lai.” The lands had rich natural soil. The Iu Mien people were able to produce enough food to support their families.

==== In Thailand ====
Since the Iu Mien people had settled in Laos and Thailand, they gained more independence. One group of Iu Mien migrated from Vietnam to Thailand. The other migrated from Vietnam to Laos. They were able to form their own villages and were run by village chiefs. Lao and Thai governments helped Iu Mien select village chiefs to run village affairs and report to the city mayor and governor about their village's social issues and problems. For the most part, the Iu Mien people were allowed to maintain their culture, identity, language, cultural norms, and ways.

Rich Iu Mien families would be able to own a house in the city and send their kids to school. The poor would be able to find land to cultivate for farming without government restrictions. The natural soils of the land were rich. They were free to farm anywhere in the countryside. The Iu Mien people were able to plant crops and be self-sufficient for many generations. The tropical forests in Laos and Thailand have all kinds of wild animals for Iu Mien to hunt for consumption as well as various kinds of tropical fruits and wild vegetables which provide nutrients to the Iu Mien people. The rivers have plenty of fish for Iu Mien to fish for food. They were enjoying life and the environment in Laos and Thailand for many generations until 1960 when the cold war began.

==== In Laos ====
Around 1700, the first group of Mien arrived in Laos, led by a party of elephant hunters who discovered a promising land for new cultivation in and around Namtha in northern Laos. Following this initial wave, a drought struck southern Yunnan in the late 1800s, prompting a second wave of migration. For some Mien, the move was a result of having exhausted their plots on the mountain; a primary factor contributing to the frequent emigration out of China was the scarcity of fertile land. The Mien had been migrating away from their original homeland in Hunan province for centuries due in part to this same challenge, as the reality of slash-and-burn agriculture is that the yield eventually becomes insufficient.

===== The Secret War =====
In the 1960s, when the Cold War was occurring between the United States and the Soviet Union with an arms race this caused political unrest in Southeast Asia. The United States spread the free world government system into Vietnam, Laos, and Cambodia. At the same time, the Soviet Union had spread the communist system into Vietnam, Laos, and Cambodia as well. The people within those three countries were also divided and run by two government systems. Civil war broke out.

Vietnam was divided into two countries, North Vietnam and South Vietnam; North Vietnam was run by a communist regime led by Ho Chi Minh. South Vietnam was led by the elected Vietnamese President and supported by the United States government. The Vietnam War began. At the same time, Laos and Cambodia also had two government systems, one supported by the United States and the other supported by the Soviet Union Socialist Republic. The civil war began as Vietnam War. The cold war in South East Asia interrupted the lives of Iu Mien society and changed them forever.

The United States government sent Central Intelligence Agency (CIA) and military advisors to Laos in support of the Royal Lao government to fight against communists Pathet Lao. They recruited the Iu Mien people as their soldiers to fight against the Lao Communist regime. The war had caused many Iu Mien casualties along with other tribes. Iu Mien soldiers were armed with American-made weapons and dressed in American military uniforms and also funded by American taxpayer dollars. Over a 15-year period, more American bombs were dropped by American planes over Laos than in World War I and World War II combined. Lao citizens became refugees all over Laos. The United States Agency for International Development (USAID) provided aid to the refugees.

By 1975, the Pathet Lao communists had gained complete control over Laos. They captured the Royal Lao high-ranking government officials and sent them to a concentration camp. The majority of them starved to death. The others were sentenced to death by firing squad and others suffered from illness due to malnutrition and also died in the concentration camp. The majority of former elected government officials, ministries, governors, mayors, government workers, and all educators were sent to concentration camps for re-education. In most cases, the Lao communist soldiers, armed with Soviet-made or Chinese-made AK-47s, forced them to work from dawn to dark without food and many starved to death.

The majority of Iu Mien was among the Lao communist's enemies due to their involvement with the U.S. CIA operation during the war in Laos. Iu Mien began fleeing the Laos communist regime in mid-1975 into Thailand. These escapes mostly began late at night. While Laos communist troops were sleeping whole villages would be packed with their personal belongings, valuable items, silver bars, jewelry, and food. Everyone had to carry their personal belongings on their backs and walk barefoot.

The journey began by walking on a terrain trail and it took about a month to reach the Thai border. During the journey, Iu Mien refugees had encounters with many dangerous consequences. Some stepped on land mines set up by the Laos communist troops and lost their lives without proper burial by their loved ones. They encountered bandits armed with semi-automatic weapons, who took all valuable items from the refugee families. Furthermore, Iu Mien lost many lives by crossing monsoon-flooded rivers. Many family members drowned while crossing the rising river during monsoon season.

When the Iu Mien refugees made it to the Thai border, they faced Laos communist persecution. However, the Thai border patrol troops stopped them at the Thai and Lao border. From time to time, the Thai defense Minister closed the border and did not allow refugees to enter Thailand within a certain time.

The refugee camps were funded and set up by the United Nations High Commissioner for Refugees and enforced by Thai authorities. The refugee camps were barbed with metal wire and guarded by Thai soldiers 24 hours a day and 7 days a week. No refugees were allowed to go out of the refugee camp. The living conditions were very poor. There was no running water. There was no clean water to drink or for a shower. Personal hygiene was poor and caused illness. The food was distributed by the UNHCR program but had to go through the Thai authorities before it reached the needy refugees. By that time, the food that got to refugee families was so limited. All refugees were starving and caused malnutrition as well as all kind of illnesses and lost many lives during their stay in the refugee camp.

==== Western countries ====
In 1976, the western governments sent their embassy personnel to interview Lao refugees and process legal documents to allow them to settle in western countries. From 1976 to 1995, 40,000 thousand plus Iu Mien refugees were settled in the United States of America. The majority of Iu Mien people in the U.S. today live in California, Oregon, Washington, Alaska, and North Carolina. Few lives scatter all over the United States due to following jobs, pursuing education, and marriage. The Iu Mien people today are spreading out to the western hemisphere. About 1,500 plus were settled in France. About 400 Iu Mien people were settled in Canada. Few families were settled in Australia and New Zealand. A couple of families had settled in Denmark.

Each time the Iu Mien migrated into a new country, they have to leave many fellow Iu Mien people behind. The majority of Iu Mien people still remain in China. At least 2 to 3 million Iu Mien are living in China. 500,000 thousand plus Iu Mien are living in Vietnam. About 50,000 thousand plus Iu Mien people are living in Thailand and about 30,000 thousand plus are still remaining in Laos.

== Culture ==
=== Marriage ===
The Iu Mien have a strong family foundation. Marriage norms are strongly preserved in Iu Mien society. When a man feels that his girlfriend is a potential wife, he will ask his parents to set up a meeting with the girl's parents. When the girl's parents accept the invitation to meet and confirm it with the prospective groom's family, they prepare a meal for the boy's family. The prospective groom's parents will ask for his girlfriend's birth date to check if they match each other. If their birth dates match and further discussion goes smoothly, further discussion will take place, the boy will give a silver bracelet to his prospective wife, symbolizing primary engagement. If the girl feels ready to spend the rest of her life with the man who has proposed to her, she will keep the silver bracelet. However, she will make an attempt to return a silver bracelet to her boyfriend at least once so as to test him. This allows the girl to test if the man who has proposed to her truly loves her. In order to pass the test, the boyfriend must bring the silver bracelet back to his girlfriend and ask her to keep it, a request she will accept. The boy will then ask his parents to set up a second appointment to negotiate the girl's dowry and details of the wedding with her parents. There are two types of Iu Mien weddings: small weddings and big wedding ceremonies. The big wedding ranges in cost from $15,000 to $30,000, excluding the bride price, and the small wedding costs between $5,000 to $15,000 without the bride price.

On the wedding day, each set of parents will appoint a master of ceremonies for their child. These figures provide guidance, mentorship, and lectures to prepare the betrothed for married life. The two selected masters of wedding ceremonies are well respected in the Iu Mien community, trained in the Iu Mien religion as master shamans, and prepared to solve social problems. For the groom, the master of ceremonies is called cingh suiv and is responsible for performing a ceremonial chant to alert the groom's god of ancestors that the bride is joining the family. Following this chant, the new ancestor god will protect her from harm and bless the couple with fertility, wealth, and lifelong commitment. For the bride, the master of ceremonies is called muih mienh and is responsible for escorting the bride to the groom's house on the eve of the wedding and chanting in thanks to the bride's god of ancestors, who has cared for the bride from birth until this moment. Following the ceremony, the bride's ancestor god will no longer watch over her as she joins her husband's family.

Iu Mien's family structure is based on a kinship system, meaning that following her marriage, a woman moves to live with her husband's family. In Iu Mien culture, a wife's primary responsibility is to do household chores, the husband's primary responsibility is to provide financial support, and both parents are equally responsible for raising and caring for their children.

=== Religions ===
Iu Mien traditional religion is a combination of native religious practices (animism, shamanism and ancestor worship) and Yao Daoism. For many Iu Mien people, these traditions are closely interconnected rather than existing as completely separate systems. Native spiritual practices focus on relationships with ancestors, spirits, and other supernatural beings, while Yao Daoism provides a broader religious framework of Daoist teachings, deities, rituals, and a celestial hierarchy. Together, these traditions have shaped Iu Mien spiritual life and continue to influence ceremonies, family traditions, and cultural identity.

Yao Daoism has its roots in Chinese Daoist traditions and became established among the Yao peoples of southern China during the Northern (960–1127) and Southern Song (1127–1279) dynasties. The Tianxin Zhengfa tradition, or the “True Rites of the Heart of Heaven,” became particularly influential among the Yao during this time. As the Yao adopted Daoist teachings, they incorporated them into existing native beliefs and practices. This resulted in a religious tradition that includes Daoist gods and a celestial hierarchy while continuing to recognize the importance of ancestors, spirits, shamans, and indigenous religious practices. Among the Iu Mien, figures such as Ba’Ong, the God of Thunder, are part of this broader spiritual world.

Shamanism and ancestor worship remain important elements of Iu Mien traditional religion. Shamans perform rituals that communicate with ancestors and other spiritual beings. Daoist priests, meanwhile, perform more formal rituals and communicate with higher celestial beings through Daoist texts, petitions, and ceremonies. This includes ceremonies such as the guaax dang ceremony for males in which the initiate undergoes sacred rites to enter his name in the celestial lineage registry, granting him divine protection and the authority to communicate directly with the spirit world as a shaman or priest, should he choose to undergo the training.

Other Traditional Religious Practices and Historical Record

After losing his nation to China, King Pan created a new worship system by worshiping ancestor spirits and a universal god. Due to no permanent place to build temples, King Pan and the shaman/priest had formed art posters consisting of the universal gods including three brothers of Celestials and many universal spirit gods. These poster images can be easily carried when they moved from mountain to mountain without interrupting worshiping. All shaman spiritual books start with King Pan as a founder of the religion and creator. The most important aspect of Iu Mien ancestor worship is when a person died. When a family member has died, they will host a ceremony. Iu Mien people believe a deceased person has two types of spirit/soul. Good and bad spirits need to be properly sent to a certain place. The Iu Mien priest/shaman will perform a ceremony to guide the deceased soul/spirit to the spirit world. The good spirit will be worshiped by his/her children and it can help protect the family from harm and bless a family by many means. The bad spirit will be sent to hell and locked away so it will not be able to come back to haunt family members. The priests/shamans perform a ceremony of chanting for 2–3 days in order to wrap up and complete the deceased spirit and soul and guide each spirit/soul to the right destination of the spirit world so that the evil spirit doesn't come back to haunt family members. The deceased's good spirit/soul becomes a heavenly being and looks after his/her surviving family members on a daily basis.

From time to time, family members will offer chicken and joss paper money to the deceased's good spirit to ask for guidance and protection from harm. At other times, family members dream or have nightmares about the deceased family member. That means the deceased spirit/soul needs help from their living family member so the ancestor god will send a message by dreaming. On the other occasion, ancestor gods will send strange things such as making birds fly into the Iu Mien house. If this signal is received by a family member, the ceremony will take place. By offering chicken and joss paper, the spirit world will gain wealth. In return, god spirit will help the human world to gain all kinds of well-being. Such as a family's business will gain profit, a working person will get paid raises, students have creative ideas to concentrate on study, and a person feels sad without a reason will gain strength and confidence. The ill person will gain energy and get healed/well. Each deceased person gets three times ceremony during his/her children's lifetime, the spirit/soul becomes heaven god and has more power to take good care of his/her children and grandchildren. When Iu Mien priests/shamans chant, they start to tell a story of how King Pan created society, the priest/shaman laminated from King Pan and called King Pan's spirit/soul to bless so that the priest has more power to perform the ceremony well. King Pan was ahead of religion and the head of state when he was a King. Even today, Iu Mien people still believe his spirit/soul has the power to deal with the spirit world and the human world for many good reasons. (Religion storytelling by Saeng Fou Orn Saephanh, the grand priest/Shaman).

=== Festivals ===
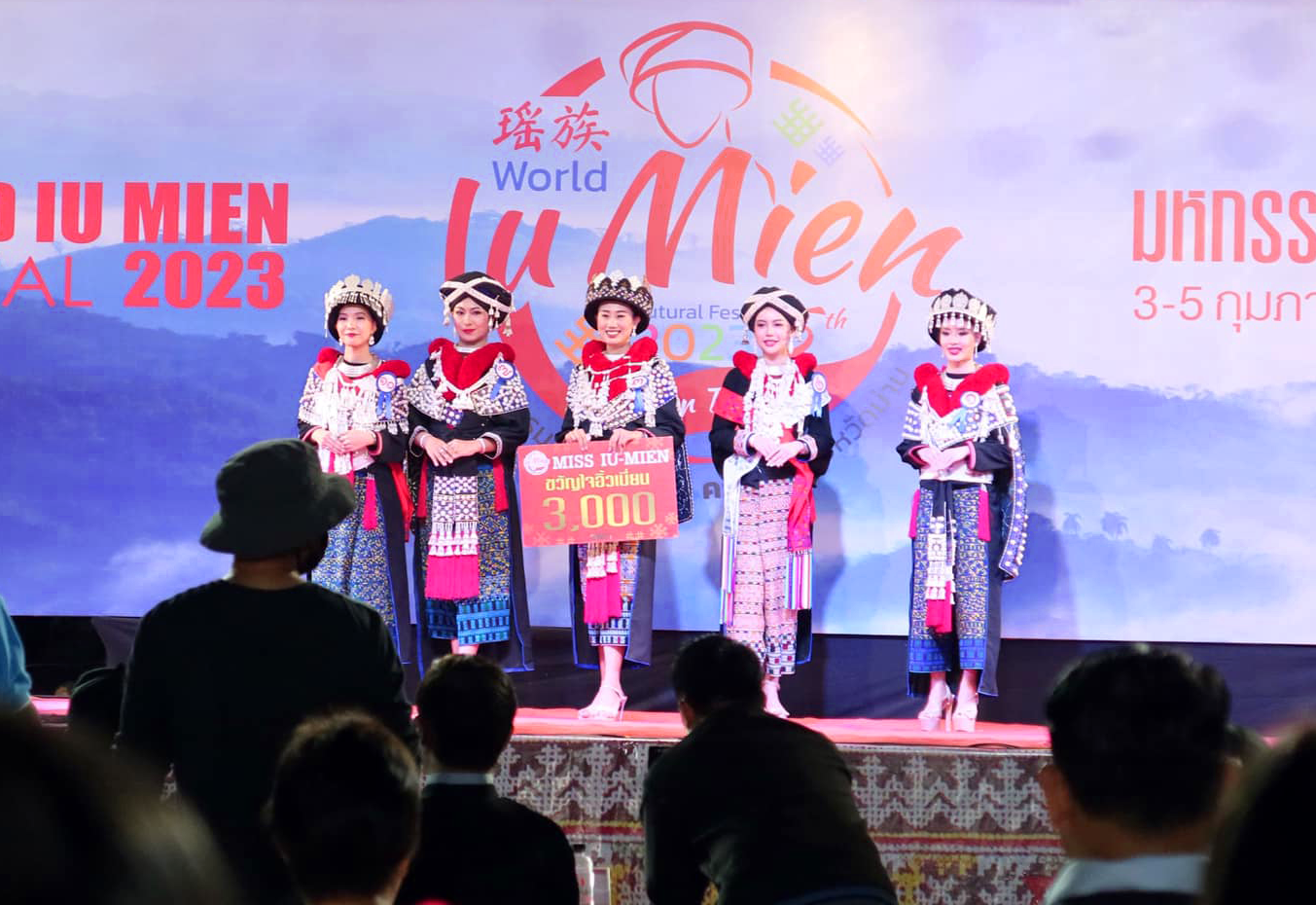
Iu Mien Festival Pageant Contestants - Nan, Thailand

There are two main holidays that the Iu Mien celebrate, New Year's Day and July 14. New Year's Day for the Iu Mien is the same day as the Chinese Lunar New Year. There is a ritual on the eve of the New Year, in which an Iu Mien family will prepare an offering to their ancestor gods such as a shaman chanting and offering incense, pig, paper, and firewood for the ritual. After the offering by a shaman is over, a pig will be cooked and made into a variety of dishes, and family members, cousins, relatives, and friends will be invited to have a feast together. Eggs dyed red is used for Iu Mien New Year's Day. Eggs at New Year symbolize a blessing to an individual's soul or spirit. The other holiday is July 14, celebrating spirit day. The Iu Mien people believe that the 14th is a day for the entire universe of spirits-gods New Year's Day. In the old days, villagers did not go to work in the fields or farms or do anything related to work outside the house. In every household, the people give credit to the spirit and set them free, the household will offer incense paper to the ancestor spirits for them to buy things in the spirit world. On July 15, the ancestor spirits are traditionally believed to be in every leaf in every tree. People are traditionally forbidden to touch or explore all tree leaves. It is believed that if a person touches a leaf or cuts down a tree this will bother spirits which will cause the individual who did so to become ill. On July 16 it is believed that the whole universe's spirits return to the spirit world so everything in the human world is believed to become normal again.

== Diaspora ==
Iu Mien teens during a Shasta County Lunar New Year celebration in Anderson, California.

Today, there are about 30,000 to 50,000 Iu Mien people living in the United States. There are many social issues and problems facing the Iu Mien communities in the United States as well. Many Iu Mien people are still living at the poverty level.

== See also ==
- The Art of Not Being Governed
