= Journal of Legal Analysis =

- Discipline: Law
- Language: English
- Edited by: Oren Bar-Gill, Daryl Levinson

Publication details
- History: 2009-present
- Publisher: Oxford University Press on behalf of the Harvard Law School
- Open access: Yes
- Impact factor: 2.750 (2020)

Standard abbreviations
- ISO 4: J. Leg. Anal.

Indexing
- ISSN: 2161-7201 (print); 1946-5319 (web)
- LCCN: 2010222501
- OCLC no.: 891520866

Links
- Journal homepage; Online archive

The Journal of Legal Analysis is a peer-reviewed open access law journal that was established in 2009. It is published by Oxford University Press on behalf of the Harvard Law School and covers all aspects of law. The editors-in-chief are Oren Bar-Gill (Harvard University) and Daryl Levinson (New York University).

== Abstracting and indexing ==
The journal is abstracted and indexed in:

- Current Contents/Social and Behavioral Sciences
- EBSCO databases
- HeinOnline
- Scopus
- Social Sciences Citation Index

According to the Journal Citation Reports, the journal has a 2020 impact factor of 2.750.
