= Jingman =

The term "Jingman" (Chinese: 荆蛮)," also known as "Chuman (楚蛮)", was used by the people of the Central Plains in ancient China to collectively refer to the inhabitants of Wu, Chu, Yue states, their former sites, and the broader southern regions of China. In a narrow sense, it refers specifically to the designation for the uncivilized ethnic groups in the four commanderies of Lingling (零陵郡), Guiyang (桂阳郡), Changsha (长沙郡), and Wuling (武陵郡) under the jurisdiction of ancient Jingzhou.

== Description ==
According to the "Records of the Grand Historian: Annals of Zhou (史记-周本纪)," "Taibo and Yuzhong (虞仲) knew that Zhou King (古公亶父) intended to establish Jili (季历) as his successor so that the throne could eventually be passed to Jichang (季昌). Therefore, they fled to the land of the Jingman." Another interpretation suggests that it refers to the precursor of the Chu state, which became a feudal state in the early Western Zhou Dynasty. When the Chu state conquered Yue, its territory became part of Chu. Later, when the Qin Dynasty overthrew Chu, the territory fell under Qin's control. However, Qin avoided using the term "Chu" and instead renamed it "Jing."
