= Oren Bar-Gill =

Israeli-American academic, economist and lawyer

- Born: 1975 (age 50–51)
- Occupations: Lawyer, economist, academic, and author
- Awards: Young Scholar Medal, American Law Institute

Academic background
- Education: B.A., Economics; LL.B. M.A., Law & Economics; LL.M. (Master of Laws); Ph.D., Economics; S.J.D., Doctorate in Law
- Alma mater: Tel-Aviv University; Tel-Aviv University School of Law; Harvard Law School

Academic work
- Institutions: New York University School of Law (2005-2014, 2025) Harvard Law School (2014-2025)

Oren Bar-Gill (Hebrew: אורן בר-גיל; born 1975) is an Israeli-American lawyer, economist, and academic. He is John Edward Sexton Professor of Law and Economics at New York University School of Law, and a Sackler Fellow at Tel Aviv University. He is most known for his research in contract law (especially consumer contracts), law and economics, and behavioral law and economics.

Bar-Gill is the author of two books entitled, Seduction by Contract: Law, Economics, and Psychology in Consumer Markets, and Algorithmic Harm: Protecting People in the Age of Artificial Intelligence. has published over 60 academic articles. His research spans the field of consumer economics, with particular emphasis on the relationships between consumers and commercial entities, and consumer psychology, and it derives legal policy implications aimed at helping consumers. He is associated with the advisory boards of Singapore Journal of Legal Studies, U.S. Financial Diaries, and Berlin Center for Consumer Policies, He served (together with Omri Ben-Shahar and Florencia Marotta-Wurgler) as Reporter for the Restatement of the Law, Consumer Contracts.

== Early life and education ==
Bar-Gill was born in 1975 in Israel to parents Aharon and Nechama. Being raised in Israel, he completed his high school studies at Ort Kiryat Bialik in 1992. He graduated from Tel-Aviv University with a B.A. degree in economics in 1995. He then earned an LL.B., as well as an M.A. degree in Law and Economics from Tel-Aviv University in 1996. He has two doctorate degrees, in economics and in law. Prior to receiving a Ph.D. degree in economics at Tel-Aviv University in 2002, he enrolled at Harvard Law School and earned an LL.M. degree in 2001. Later on, he completed his S.J.D. (Doctorate in Law) from Harvard Law School, with a dissertation titled "Essays in Law and Economics."

== Career ==
Bar-Gill started his academic career as a Junior Fellow at Harvard University's Society of Fellows, from 2002 until 2004. In 2005, he became an assistant professor at New York University School of Law. He was promoted to associate professor in 2007, and to Professor in 2009. In 2013, he became the Evelyn and Harold Meltzer Professor of Law and Economics at New York University School of Law. In 2014, he moved to Harvard Law School, where he served as William J. Friedman and Alicia Townsend Friedman Professor of Law and Economics. In 2025, Bar-Gill returned to New York University, where he holds the John Edward Sexton Chair in Law and Economics. Bar-Gill has also been serving as Sackler Fellow and visiting professor of law at Tel Aviv University since 2017.

== Research ==
Bar-Gill has published two book and over 60 articles on topics related to contracts (with a focus on consumer contracts), law and economics, and behavioral law and economics. His research has been featured by numerous magazines, such as The New Republic, Time, The Regulatory Review, Slate, and The Intercept.

Bar-Gill's book, Seduction by Contract: Law, Economics and Psychology in Consumer Markets, explores how consumer contracts emerge from the interaction between market forces and consumer psychology. Adam B. Badawi regards Bar-Gill as "one of the foremost and influential proponents of a behaviorist take on contracts," and notes Bar-Gill's portrayal of "consumers as the targets of temptation." Hugh Collins is of the view that the book "consists of a detailed explanation of [the interaction between market forces and consumer psychology], exploring credit cards, mortgages, and cell phones."

In other work, Bar-Gill argued for establishing the Consumer Financial Protection Bureau (CFPB), explaining that, prior to the creation of the CFPB, regulators with authority to police Consumer Financial Products (CFPs) lack the motivation to do so and that regulators with motivation to protect consumers lack authority over important CFP sellers. In his article, titled "Seduction by contract: do we understand the documents we sign?" he described how policymakers are paying increasing attention to the problem of how behavioral market failures hurt consumers and undermine efficiency, and are responding with increasingly sophisticated regulatory tools. He also highlighted the dire need for designing "disclosures that can really empower consumers and solve the behavioral market failure." In 2021, Bar-Gill, together with Omri Ben-Shahar from the University of Chicago, developed a new theory of manipulation in consumer markets—one that focuses on how truthful information is prioritized.

In his 2019 study, Bar-Gill provided an account of simple disclosures like genetically modified food disclosures, and how they might cause market distortions and inefficiencies, when consumers draw false inferences from the disclosure, and when the disclosure of one dimension elevates this dimension at the expense of other dimensions, and consequently distorts demand for the product and might even alter the product itself. More recently, he presented his viewpoints on the relationship that exists between the informational content of willingness to pay (WTP) and the wealth distribution, while discussing the effect of forward-looking rationality on the WTP measure. Furthermore, in an article co-authored with Ariel Porat from Tel Aviv University, Bar-Gill highlighted how the prospect of a sale affects the seller's incentive to investigate, and what possible impact the disclosure rules of contract law have on the investigation decision.

== Awards and honors ==
- 1999–2000 – Cegla Fellowship, Tel-Aviv University School of Law
- 2000–2001 – Gammon Fellowship, Harvard Law School
- 2000–2002 – Fulbright Fellowship
- 2000–2002 – Graduate Fellowship, Harvard Law School
- 2000–2004 – Olin Fellowship in Law, Economics and Business, Harvard Law School
- 2003 – Recipient of a research grant from the William F. Milton Fund, Harvard University
- 2003 – Olin Prize for Best Paper in Law and Economics, Harvard Law School
- 2009 – Best Paper Award, American College of Consumer Financial Services Lawyers
- 2011 – Young Scholar Medal, American Law Institute
- 2013 – Podell Distinguished Teaching Award
- 2013 – "Teacher of the Year" Award, Association of American Law Schools (AALS)
- 2017 – Best Paper Prize, American Law and Economics Review

== Bibliography ==
=== Books ===
- Algorithmic Harm: Protecting People in the Age of Artificial Intelligence (2025) ISBN 9780197778197
- Seduction by Contract: Law, Economics, and Psychology in Consumer Markets (2012) ISBN 9780199663361

=== Selected articles ===
- Bar-Gill, O., & Bebchuk, L. A. (2002). Misreporting corporate performance. Harvard law and economics discussion paper.
- Bar-Gill, O. (2003). Seduction by plastic. Nw. UL Rev., 98, 1373.
- Bar-Gill, O. (2007). The behavioral economics of consumer contracts. Minn. L. Rev., 92, 749.
- Bar-Gill, O. (2008). The law, economics and psychology of subprime mortgage contracts. Cornell L. Rev., 94, 1073.
- Bar-Gill, O., & Warren, E. (2008). Making credit safer. U. Pa. L. Rev., 157, 1.
- Bar-Gill, O., & Persico, N. (2016). Exchange Efficiency with Weak Ownership Rights. American Economic Journal: Microeconomics 8, 230.
- Bar-Gill, O. (2019). Algortihmic Price Discrimination: When Demand Is a Function of Both Preferences and (Mis)perceptions. University of Chicago Law Review 86, 217.
- Bar-Gill, O., & Porat, A. (2020). Disclosure Rules in Contract Law. Journal of Legal Studies, 49, 103.
