= Lipu =

Lipu may refer to:

- LIPU, the Lega italiana protezione uccelli (En. "Italian League for Bird Protection")
- Lipu, Estonia, village in Lüganuse Parish, Ida-Viru County, Estonia
- Padua Airport, serving Padua, Veneto, Italy

== China ==
- Lipu County (荔浦县), Guilin, Guangxi
- Lipu, Jinhua (澧浦镇), town in Jindong District, Jinhua, Zhejiang
- Lipu, Sanmen County (浬浦镇), town in Sanmen County, Zhejiang
- Lipu, Zhuji (浬浦镇), town in Zhuji, Zhejiang
- Lipu, Li County (澧浦街道), a subdistrict in Li County, Hunan Province
- Lipulekh Pass at the triple border point of Burang County, Tibet Autonomous Region; Uttarakhand state, India; and Darchula District, Nepal
