= Zhang Huizan =

- 張輝瓚
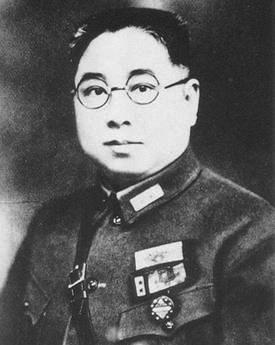
- Zhang Huizan
- Born: 1885 or 1884; Changsha County, Hunan, Qing Empire
- Died: 1931 (aged 46–47) or 1931 (aged 45–46); Ji'an County, Jiangxi, Republic of China
- Spouse: Zhu Xinfang
- Relatives: Zhang Yuanmou (son); Zhang Yuanyi (daughter); Taisu Zhang (great grandson)
- Military career
- Allegiance: Republic of China
- Branch: Republic of China Army
- Service years: 1912–1931
- Rank: Lieutenant General
- Unit: 18th Division
- Conflicts: Northern Expedition; First Encirclement Campaign against Jiangxi Soviet

Chinese name
- Traditional Chinese: 張輝瓚
- Simplified Chinese: 张辉瓒
Transcriptions
Standard Mandarin
- Hanyu Pinyin: Zhāng Huīzàn
- Wade–Giles: Chang Hui-tsan

Zhang Huizan (1884 or 1885 – 28 January 1931) was a Lieutenant general in the Chinese National Revolutionary Army.

== Biography ==
Born in 1884 or 1885 in Changsha County, Hunan, during the Qing Empire, where he attended Hunan Bingmu School and Hunan Army Jiangwu School. After graduating from Baoding Military Academy he went to the Empire of Japan to study at Imperial Japanese Army Academy. He returned to the nascent Republic of China in 1912 and that year became staff officer in Hunan Military Government, but soon he went to the German Empire to make investigations of military.

In 1920, he became brigade commander of the 4th Mixed Brigade of the Hunan Army, he took part in the expulsion of Zhang Jingyao movement with Mao Zedong, who will be the future leader of Communist Party. He was promoted to commanding officer of the 9th Division in 1924. In 1926, the Nationalist government commissioned him as the commanding officer of the 4th Division of the 2nd National Revolutionary Army, he led the troops to the Northern Expedition. In 1929, he was commanding officer of the 18th Division, and that same year, he was promoted to Lieutenant general, but soon was transferred to Jiangxi to defend the Red Army.

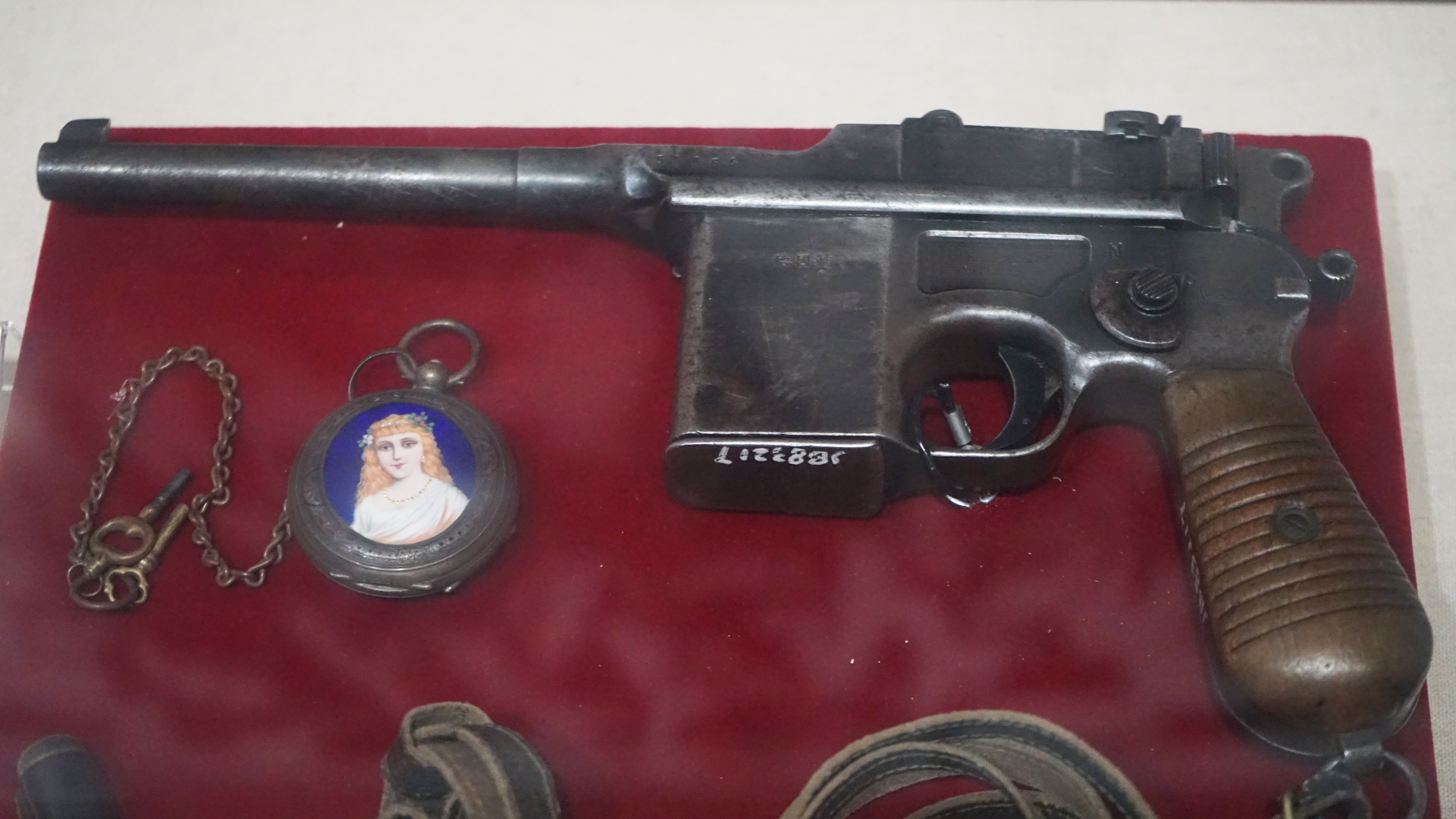
Zhang Huizan's pistol and watch.

《渔家傲·反第一次大围剿》
一九三一年春
万木霜天红烂漫，天兵怒气冲霄汉，雾满龙冈千嶂暗，齐声唤，前头捉了张辉瓒。
二十万军重入赣，风烟滚滚来天半。唤起工农千百万，同心干，不周山下红旗乱。
Tune: "Pride of fishermen"
Against the first "encirclement" campaign
Spring 1931
Under a frosty sky all woods in gorgeous red, The wrath of godlike warriors strikes the sky over head. Mist shrouds Longgang and dims the thousand peaks about. All voices shout: "Ah! Zhang Huizan is captured by our men ahead!"
Two hundred thousand troops invade Jiangxi again, Raising a cloud of dust sky-high like hurricane. Arouse a million workers and serfs to take the gun. United as one. How wild below Mount Pillar our red flags will run!

—

In late 1930, he was commissioned as commanding officer of the 18th Division, fought with the Red Army in the first "Encirclement" Campaign. On December 30, he lost the battle against the Red Army and was captured. On January 28, 1931, he was decapitated by the angry crowds. His head was thrown into the Gan River, the National Revolutionary Army salvaged his head and buried him at Yuelu Mountain, in northwestern Changsha. In reprisal, the National government killed more than one hundred Communist political prisoners in Nanchang, capital of Jiangxi province.

During the Cultural Revolution, his grave was smashed by the Red Guards. In May 2008, it was repaired by the Changsha Municipal People's Government.

== Personal life ==
Zhang and his wife Zhu Xinfang (朱信芳) had one son and one daughter:

- Son: Zhang Yuanmou (张远谋; 1918 - 1996), was a professor at Tianjin University, he was a member of the China Democratic League.
- Daughter: Zhang Yuanyi (张远仪), is a Chinese-American architect.
- Descendants: Taisu Zhang, a professor at the Yale Law School.
