= Panhu =

Important figure in Chinese and Yao mythologies

Panhu (hanzi: 盤瓠; pinyin Pánhù; IPA: /pʰan³⁵-xu⁵¹/) is an important figure in Han and Yao mythologies. The Panhu mythological complex includes myths in Chinese and also other languages. This myth has a long history of being transmitted by Han Chinese and several of the other ethnic groups of the fifty-six officially recognized by the current administration of China, both orally and in literature. The Panhu myth is an important origin myth for various ethnic groups.

== Basic myth ==
The basic Panhu myth is about a dragon-dog who transformed into a man and married a princess. In the myth, there was an old woman in an ancient Chinese king's palace who had ear pain for many years. A royal physician plucked out a small, golden worm from her ear, and placed it inside of a gourd covered with a plate. This is the origin of Panhu's name, which literally means "plate gourd". The worm then turned into a dog, Panhu, who in some versions had five colored fur. The king offered to marry his daughter to anybody that would present him with the head of his enemy. This was accomplished by Panhu. Accounts vary, but eventually Panhu and the princess had six sons and six daughters who became the famous 12 clans of Chinese mythology.

== Variants ==
There are also variant versions. In some variants, the dragon-dog became transformed into a human, except for his head. This is sometimes attributed to the princess worrying that he was starving inside the golden vessel he was placed inside of for seven days and seven nights to transform into a human, which resulted in the process being incomplete.

== Myth versus history ==
In the study of historical Chinese culture, many of the stories that have been told regarding characters and events which have been written or told of the distant past have a double tradition: one which presents a more historicized version and one which presents a more mythological version. This is also true in many of the accounts related to Panhu.

== Religion ==
Many of the myths regarding agriculture in China are related to popular religion and ritual. In modern times, Panhu has been worshiped by the She people and Yao people as "King Pan".

== See also ==
- Chinese folklore

=== Works cited ===
- Christie, Anthony (1968). Chinese Mythology. Feltham: Hamlyn Publishing. ISBN 0600006379.
- Yang, Lihui, et al. (2005). Handbook of Chinese Mythology. New York: Oxford University Press. ISBN 978-0-19-533263-6
