= No. 1 Middle School =

No. 1 Middle School or No. 1 High School can refer to any of the following secondary schools:

== China ==
=== Beijing ===
- Beijing Shunyi Niulanshan No. 1 Middle School

=== Fujian ===
- Fuzhou No. 1 Middle School
- Fujian Nanping First Secondary School of Jianyang District, in Nanping
- Yunxiao No.1 High School of Fujian

=== Guangdong ===
- Foshan No.1 High School
- Jiangmen No. 1 Middle School
- Shantou No.1 High School

=== Guizhou ===
- Tongren No. 1 Middle School

=== Hebei ===
- Tangshan No.1 High School

=== Heilongjiang ===
- Daqing No.1 Middle School
- Hegang No.1 High School

=== Henan ===
- Zhengzhou No.1 High School

=== Hunan ===
- First Middle School of Changsha
- Shuangfeng County No. 1 High School, in Loudi
- Hunan Yongzhou No.1 High School

=== Inner Mongolia ===
- No. 1 Senior High School in Baotou

=== Jiangsu ===
- Changzhou No.1 High School
- No.1 Middle School of Xuyi County, in Huai'an
- Nanjing No.1 High School
- Wuxi No. 1 High School
- Xuzhou No.1 Middle School

=== Jilin ===
- Jilin City No.1 High School

=== Shaanxi ===
- Xi'an Gaoxin No.1 High School

=== Shandong ===
- Qingdao No. 1 High School

=== Xinjiang ===
- No.1 Senior High School of Ürümqi

== Malaysia ==
- Chung Hua Middle School No. 1, in Kuching
