= Qu Qinyue =

Chinese astrophysicist and writer (born 1935)

- 曲钦岳
- Born: 21 May 1935 (age 91); Mouping, Shandong, China
- Education: Nanjing University
- Scientific career
- Fields: Astrophysics
- Workplaces: Nanjing University

Qu Qinyue (simplified Chinese: 曲钦岳; traditional Chinese: 曲欽岳; pinyin: Qū Qīnyuè; Wade–Giles: Ch'ü Ch'in-yüeh) (born 21 May 1935) is a Chinese astrophysicist and writer. He is a professor and former president of Nanjing University. He is a pioneer of high-energy astrophysics in China, and his research mainly focuses on pulsars, neutron stars, X-ray sources, γ-ray sources and quasars. In 1980 he was elected a member of the Chinese Academy of Sciences.

== Life and career ==
Qu Qinyue was born in Mouping, Shandong. His father was a merchant and his mother a housewife. He received his early education at Yantai Jinglun Street Primary School. Later he attended Yantai No. 1 Middle School, Zhifu Middle School and Qingdao Jiao'ao Middle School, finally graduating from Lixian Middle School. He then finished his senior high school study at Qingdao No. 1 High School.

In 1953 he entered Nanjing University, where he studied astronomy, mathematics and physics. His teachers included astronomer Dai Wensai. In his sophomore year he proposed a wall newspaper named Academic Garden, where he and his classmates posted their ideas for learning. He was also a good athlete, in 1956 his team broke the school record in the 4 × 100 m relay.

After graduating in 1957, Qu became a teaching assistant of Nanjing University. In 1958 he took part in the development of China's first solar tower, and corrected an error in the design of image rotation mirror by a Soviet scholar. During the Cultural Revolution, he was sent to work at a coal mine, and then at Liyang Farm. He was unable to return to the university until 1971. After 1973, astrophysics research at Nanjing University was revived. Some of Qu's most important work was done in the late 1970s.

Qu became a full professor in 1978, and a member of the Chinese Academy of Sciences in 1980. In 1982 he became a member of Ministry of Education Science Textbook Compilation Committee and director of its Department of Astronomy. From 1984 to 1997, he served as President of Nanjing University. In August 1990 he and five other university presidents (including Lu Yongxiang) cosigned a letter to the premier Li Peng, requesting more support on universities during the 8th five-year plan. The academic ranking of Nanjing University rose rapidly under his leadership. In 1992 he was elected President of the Chinese Astronomical Society, and in 1993 a member of TWAS.

== Work ==
In 1976, Qu and his colleagues developed statistical curves on pulsar energy loss rates, and suggested that JP 1953 is a pulsar. On 5 March 1979, an intense burst of hard X-rays and γ-rays was recorded, and Qu's team analyzed its light curve and energy spectrum. They created a model for a neutron star binary system, and provided detailed explanation of the observational data using the mechanism of Bremsstrahlung and Kruskal-Schwarzschild instability. Their work was reported at the 17th International Cosmic Ray Conference held in 1981.

About the same time, Fang Lizhi, Qu Qinyue, Wang Zhenru and others proposed a theory that abnormal neutron stars, in which neutrons are in a state that their effective mass become zero or nearly zero, are a form of stars during their final period. They studied the stability of these stars, and suggested their maximum mass is approximately 4 solar masses, about twice the Tolman–Oppenheimer–Volkoff limit. Their results demonstrated that meta-stable compact stars can exist.

During the 1990s, Qu's team created new models to explain the relation between X-ray luminosity of plerionic supernova remnants and rotational energy loss rates of their central supernova. They interpreted the special shapes of some supernova remnants, such as CTB109. SS 433 was another subject they studied, calculating physical characteristics and parameters of its infrared knots. His team also discussed a fourteenth century supernova's relationship with the γ-ray source 2CG353+16. In 1993, Qu co-authored a textbook titled Stellar Atmosphere Physics (《恒星大气物理》) with Wang Zhenru.
