= Longquan (disambiguation) =

Longquan is a city in Zhejiang, China.

Longquan may also refer to:

- Longquan celadon, type of green-glazed Chinese ceramic
- Longquan Monastery, Buddhist monastery in Haidian District, Beijing, China
- Shangjing Longquanfu or Longquan Prefecture, capital of Bohai/Palhae

Towns (龙泉镇)

- Longquan, Xintian (龙泉镇), a town of Xintian County, Hunan
- Longquan, Yantai, Shandong
- Longquan, Huguan County, Shanxi
- Longquan, Yanggao County, Shanxi
- Longquan, Xi County, Shanxi
- Longquan, Shenchi County, Shanxi

Township (龙泉乡)

- Longquan Township, Zuoquan County, Shanxi

Subdistricts (龙泉街道)

- Longquan Subdistrict, Zhuzhou, Hunan
- Longquan Subdistrict, Chengdu, Sichuan

Mountains

- Longquan Mountains, Sichuan

== See also ==
Longquanyi District, one of the nine districts of Chengdu, Sichuan
