= Wutong, Yongzhou =

Coordinates: 26°27′26″N 111°35′29″E

Wutong (Chinese: 梧桐街道; pinyin: Wútóng Jiēdào) is a subdistrict and the seat of Lengshuitan District in Yongzhou Prefecture-level City, Hunan, China. The subdistrict is located in the middle southwest portion of Lengshuitan District and was formed in January 2003, it has an area of 4.13 km^{2} (1.59 sq mi) with a population of 43,699 (as of 2010 census). In 2015, the subdistrict was divided into 3 communities. Its seat is at Wutong Community (Chinese: 梧桐社区).
