= Xujiajing =

Xujiajing Subdistrict 徐家井街道
- Subdistrict
- Interactive map of Xujiajing Subdistrict
- Coordinates: 26°13′30″N 111°36′42″E
- Country: People's Republic of China
- Province: Hunan
- City: Yongzhou
- District: Lingling District
- Administrative centre: Xujiajing Community (徐家井社区)
- Divisions: 3 communities

Population (2019)
  - Total: 41,296
- Time zone: UTC+8 (China Standard)
- Area code: 0746
- Official Language: Standard Chinese
- Dialects: Yongzhou dialect

Xujiajing (Chinese: 徐家井; pinyin: Xújiājǐng Jiēdào) is a sub-district and the district seat of Lingling District in Yongzhou City, Hunan, China. The subdistrict has an area of 7.3 km^{2} (2.8 sq mi) with a population of 41,296 (as of 2019 census). Its seat is at Xujiajing Community (Chinese: 徐家井社区).

The sub-district is located in the north-central portion of Lingling District. It is historically the former Chengbei Subdistrict (Chinese: 城北街道) formed in January 1980 and was renamed to its present name in June 1995.

== Culture ==
Xujiajing Street is named after Xujiajing (徐家井), a well that is always dry.

== Subdivision ==
As of June 2020, the sub-district of Xujiajing has three communities.

3 communities

- Huilongta Community (回龙塔社区)
- Xiaoxiangmen Community (潇湘门社区)
- Xujiajing Community (徐家井社区)
