= Liuzi Temple =

Monument to Liu Zongyuan in Hunan, China

- 柳子庙
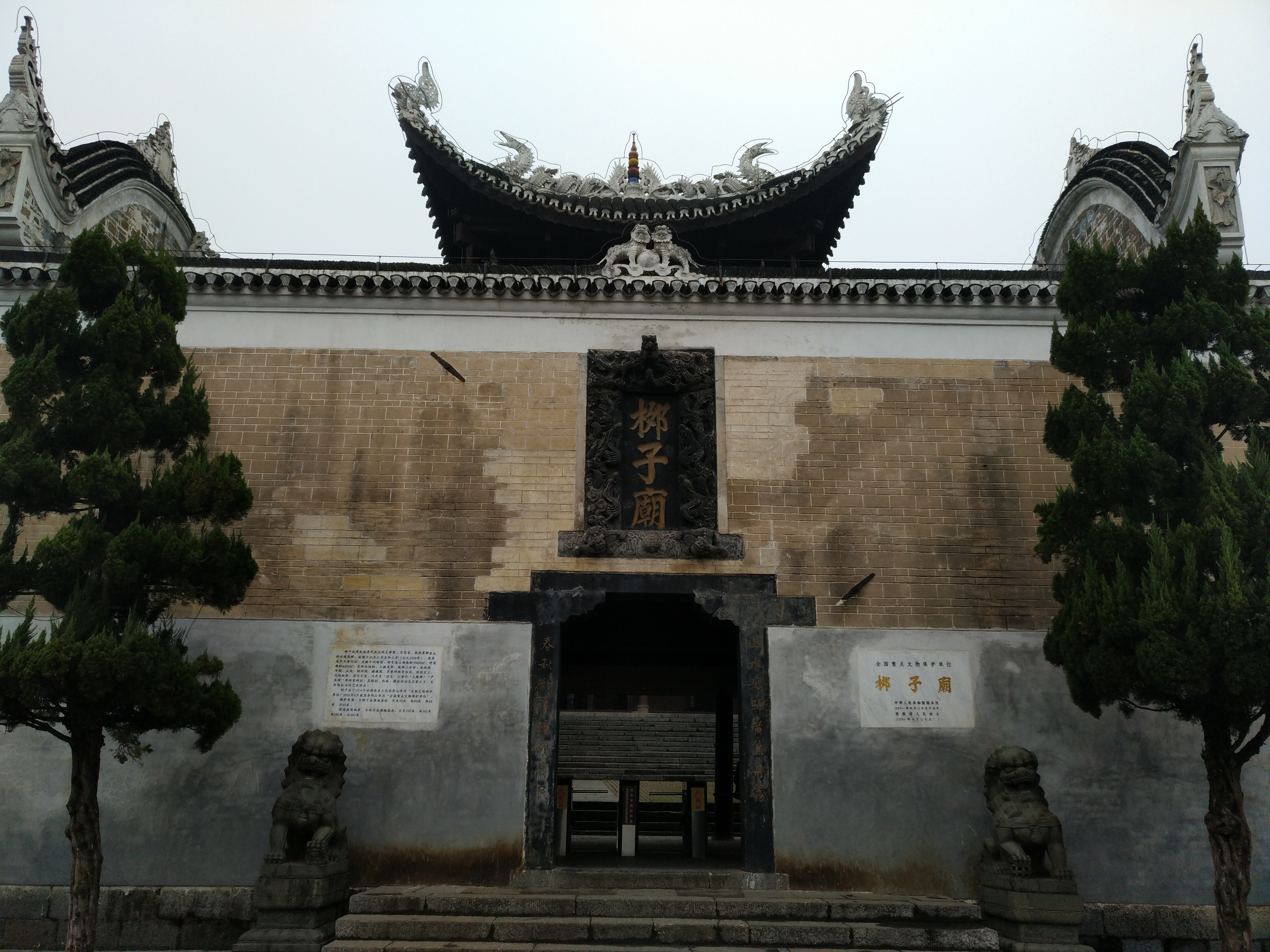
- The entrance.

- Location within Hunan Location within China

Religion
- Sect: Confucianism

Location
- Location: Lingling District, Yongzhou, Hunan
- Country: China
- Coordinates: 26.22112°N 111.60325°E

Architecture
- Established: AD 1056

Liuzi Temple (simplified Chinese: 柳子庙; traditional Chinese: 柳子廟; pinyin: Liǔzǐmiào) is a monument built to honor Liu Zongyuan, a Chinese writer, official and poet who lived there for 10 years during the Tang dynasty (618–907). The temple covers more than 2,000 square metres (22,000 sq ft) and is made of wood and brick. It is located in Yongzhou, Hunan, beside Yu Stream (愚溪).

== History ==
Liuzi Temple is a Confucian temple with a history of nearly a thousand years. It was built as Liu Zihou Ancestral Temple (柳子厚祠堂) in the 3rd Year of Period Zhihe, AD 1056, in the reign of Emperor Renzong in the Northern Song dynasty (960–1127).

The temple was reconstructed in the 14th Year of Period Shaoxing (1144) in the Southern Song dynasty (1127-1279).

The temple was repaired twice during the Ming dynasty (1368–1644); first in the 8th Year of Zhengde Emperor (1513), and then in the 25th Year of Jiajing Emperor (1546).

Liuzi Temple was repaired on a large scale in the 3rd Year of Guangxu Emperor (1877) of Qing dynasty (1644–1911).

In 1957 the temple was designated as a provincial level key cultural heritage. In 1963, Tao Zhu, secretary of Bureau of the Central Southern China of the Chinese Communist Party, visited the temple and gave an instruction to protect the temple. He said: "(We) should strengthen attention and protection of the Liuzi Temple, (we) need to raise funds to restore the Liuzi Temple as soon as possible" (要加强对柳子庙的重视和保护，筹集资金尽快加速对柳子庙的重修工作。). On June 25, 2001, it was listed among the fifth group of "State Cultural Protection Relics Units" by the State Council of China.

== Architecture ==
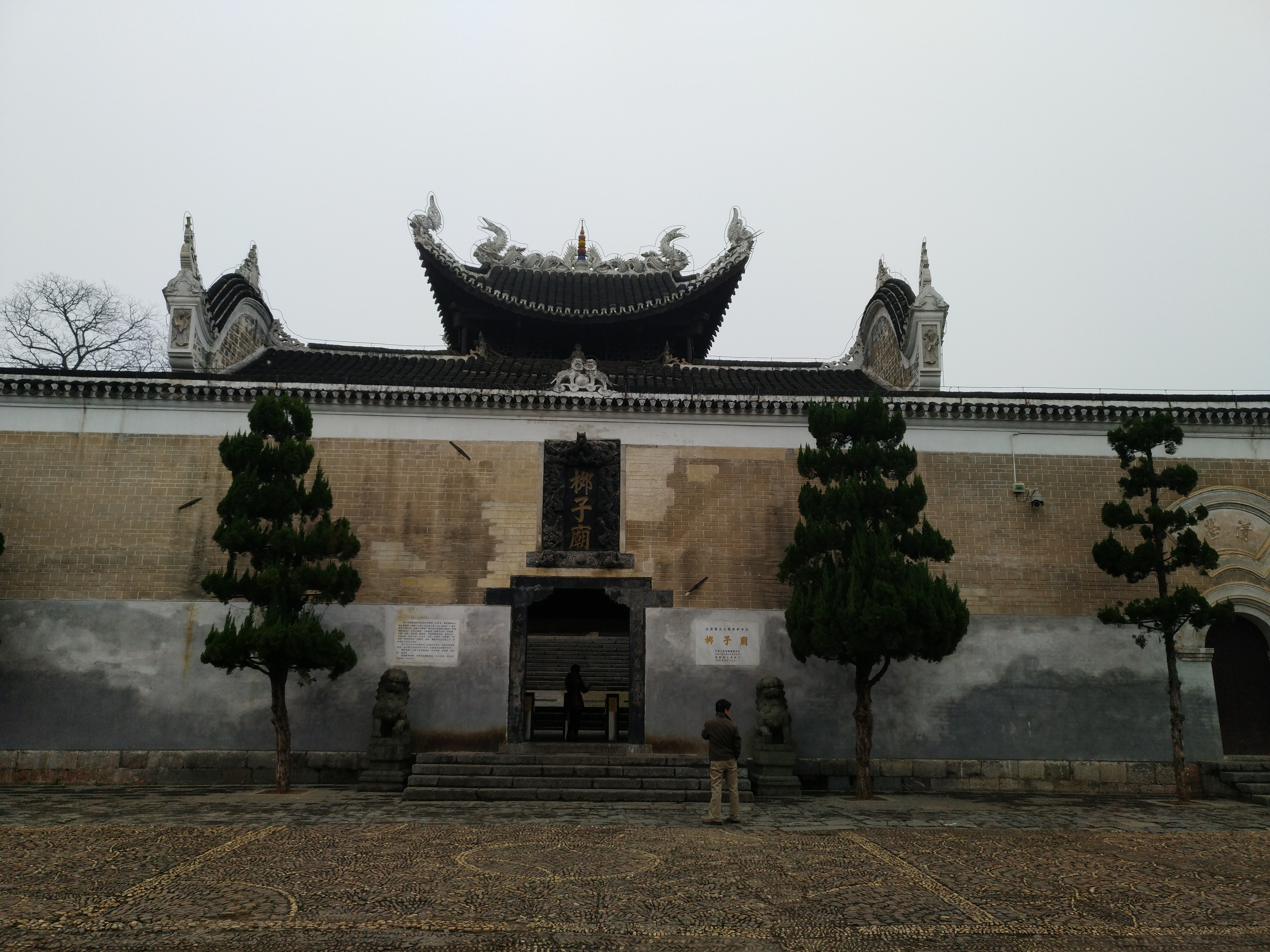
Gate of Liuzi Temple.

Liuzi Temple has three halls: the main hall (in front), the middle hall and the back hall.

=== Gate and stage ===
The gate is built in a row with a big one in the middle and a small one on each side, just like the shanmen in Han Chinese Buddhist Temples. On each side of the main entrance is a Chinese guardian lion. A couplet hanging on the two sides of the doorway reads "山水来归，黄蕉丹荔；春秋报事，福我寿民。". The couplet was written by magistrate of Yongzhou Yang Han (杨翰) in the Period of Tongzhi Emperor of Qing Dynasty. A double eave and eight columns stage behind the main hall, which was used for worshiping Liu Zongyuan. The stage was renovated in 1957. A plaque written by He Shaoji is on the stage. It reads "山水绿" (meaning "green landscape") in Chinese.

== Steles ==
Liuzi Temple has many Steles, such as Lizi Stele (荔子碑, literally, “Lychee stele”), Song of Catching Snakes (捕蛇歌), and Looking for Yu Stream and Visiting Liuzi Temple (寻愚溪谒柳子庙).

=== Lizi Stele ===
Lizi Stele, also known as Sanjue Stele (三绝碑; Sanjue, means "three wonders"). Its article content was written by Han Yu and was in Su Shi's handwriting. The Lizi Stele (originally collected in Liuhou Ancestral Temple (柳侯祠), Liuzhou. Liu Keqin (刘克勤)) was copied by a local official and later was destroyed. The modern stele was carved in the 7th Year of Tongzhi Emperor (1868) of Qing Dynasty.
