= Baiyashi =

Baiyashi Town 白牙市镇
- Town
- Location in Hunan
- Coordinates: 26.4019°N 111.2864°E
- Country: People's Republic of China
- Province: Hunan
- Prefecture-level city: Yongzhou
- County: Dong'an

Area
  - Total: 250.01 km^{2} (96.53 sq mi)

Population (2010)
  - Total: 130,256
  - Density: 521.00/km^{2} (1,349.4/sq mi)
- Time zone: UTC+8 (China Standard)
- Postal code: 4259xx

Baiyashi (Chinese: 白牙市镇; pinyin: Báiyáshì zhèn [pǎɪ jǎ ʂî ʈʂə̂n]) is a town of Dong'an County, Hunan province, China, it is the county seat of the county. the present town was reformed by merging the former Baiyashi Town and Dajiangkou Township (大江口乡) on November 11, 2015. The town is divided into 39 villages, its administrative centre is Linjiao Village (林角村).

Located in the central part of the county, the current town of Baiyashi has an area of 250.01 km^{2} (96.53 sq mi). as of the 2010 census, the current town of Baiyashi had a population of 130,256, of which the former Baiyashi Town had a population of 106,550 and Dajiangkou Township had a population of 23,706.
