= Yongzhou courthouse shooting =

2010 deadly rampage in China

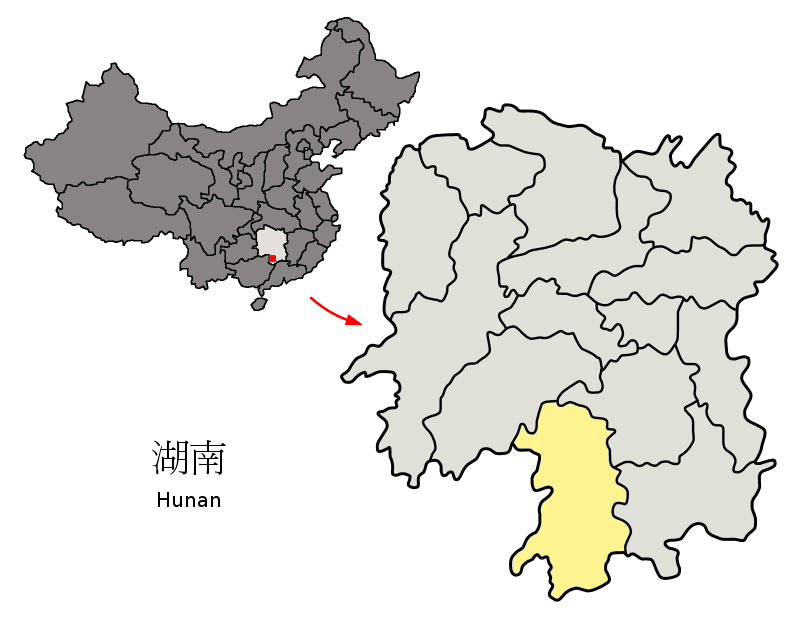
- Location of Yongzhou within Hunan
- Location: Lingling District People's Court
- Date: 1 June 2010; 10.00 a.m. (China Standard Time)
- Attack type: Mass shooting, mass murder, murder–suicide
- Weapons: Submachine gun 2 pistols
- Deaths: 4 (including the perpetrator)
- Injuries: 3
- Perpetrator: Zhu Jun

The Yongzhou courthouse shooting (Chinese: 湖南永州法院枪击案) occurred on 1 June 2010, when 46-year-old Zhu Jun (朱军), armed with a submachine gun and two pistols, entered the Lingling District People's Court (零陵区法院) in Lingling, Yongzhou, Hunan, and randomly killed three judicial workers who happened to be at work at an office on the fourth floor.

== Events ==
On 1 June 2010, just before 10:00 a.m., Zhu Jun (朱军) entered the courthouse and randomly shot at people. The attack resulted in three deaths (presiding judge Zhao Hulin, deputy chief judge Jiang Qidong, and court clerk Huang Lan) and three injured persons. The victims were not discussing the case of the assailant. Zhu killed himself after the incident.

Zhu was apparently angry at the Chinese justice system about the results of his divorce settlement. He had a son, and had separated from his wife three years previous to the incident.

Zhu worked as the head of security at the Postal Savings Bank of China's Lingling District Branch, and had obtained the weapons from post office security personnel by pretending that he needed to take them to be examined.
