= Gaoling =

Gaoling may refer to the following places in China:

- Gaoling District, an urban district in Xi'an, Shaanxi Province
- Gaoling, Shandong, a town in Shandong Province
- Gaoling, Beijing, a town in Beijing
- Gaoling Mausoleum, a tomb in Xigaoxue, Henan Province

== See also ==
- Gaol
- Gao Ling, Chinese badminton player
