= Lengshuitan, Yongzhou =

Lengshuitan 冷水滩区
- District
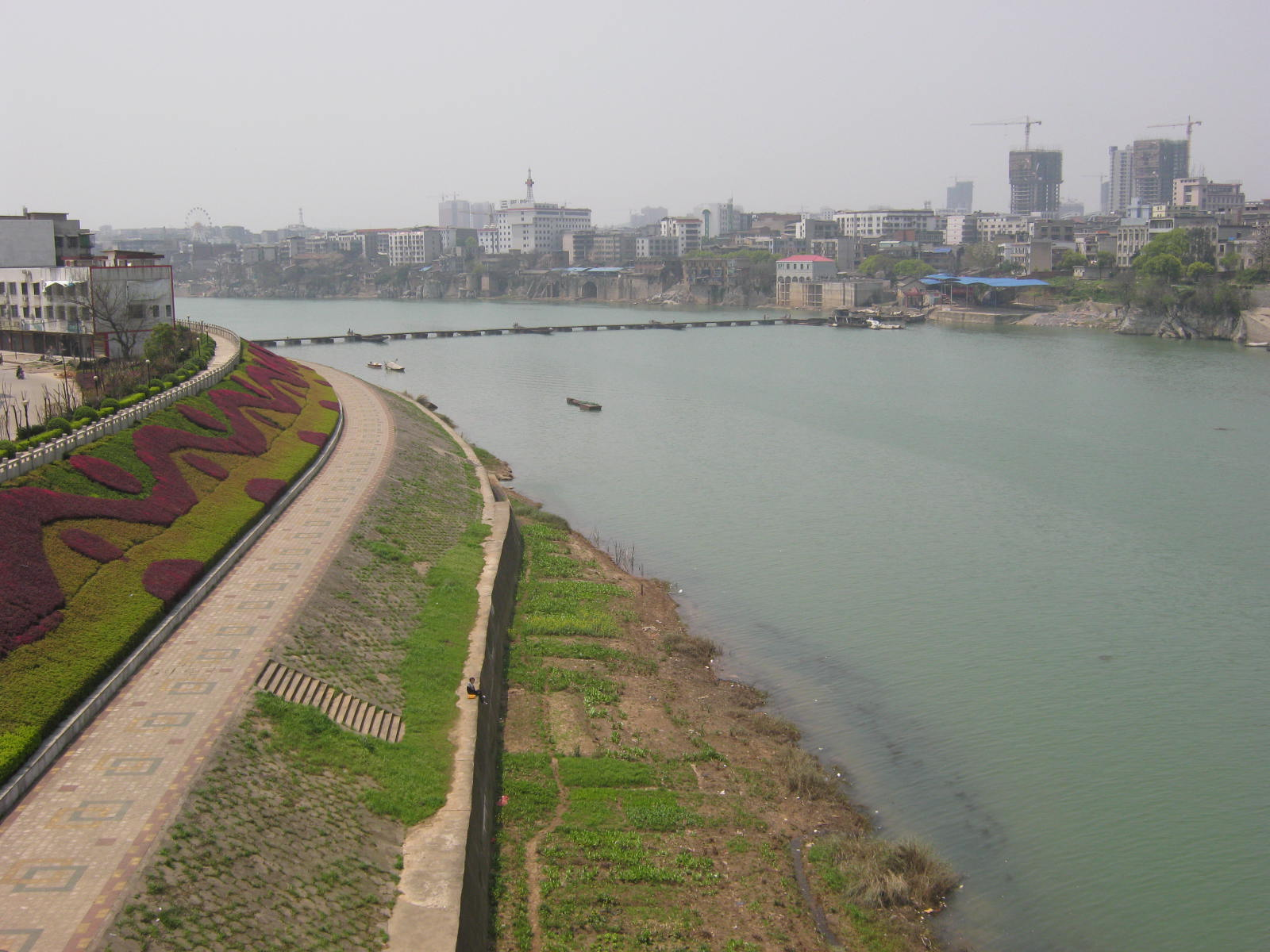
- Xiang River

- Location in Hunan
- Coordinates: 26°27′12″N 111°35′33″E
- Country: China
- Province: Hunan
- Prefecture-level city: Yongzhou
- District seat: Wutong Subdistrict

Area
  - Total: 1,218.16 km^{2} (470.33 sq mi)

Population (2020 census)
  - Total: 583,136
  - Density: 478.702/km^{2} (1,239.83/sq mi)
- Time zone: UTC+8 (China Standard)
- Postal code: 4251XX
- Official Language: Standard Chinese
- Dialects: Yongzhou dialect
- Website: www.lst.gov.cn

Lengshuitan District (simplified Chinese: 冷水滩区; traditional Chinese: 冷水灘區; pinyin: Lěngshuǐtān Qū; lit. 'cold water shoal') is one of two urban or built-up districts of Yongzhou City, Hunan Province, China. It is located on the north of the city proper, and lies to the eastern border of Guangxi. In July 1997, the government seat of Yongzhou City was moved here from Lingling District.

The district is bordered to the northwest and the north by Dong'an County, to the northeast and the east by Qidong and Qiyang Counties, and to the south by Lingling District, respectively. The district covers an area of 1,221 km^{2} (471 sq mi), and as of 2015, It had a registered population (hukou) of 552,600 and a permanent resident population of 529,200. Lengshuitan District has 8 subdistricts, 8 towns, and 3 townships under its jurisdiction, and the government seat is Wutong (梧桐街道).

== Administrative divisions ==
9 subdistricts

- Meiwan Subdistrict (梅湾街道)
- Lingjiaoshan Subdistrict (菱角山街道)
- Xiaojiayuan Subdistrict (肖家园街道)
- Yangjiaqiao Subdistrict (杨家桥街道)
- Wutong Subdistrict (梧桐街道)
- Fenghuang Subdistrict (凤凰街道)
- Shanhu Subdistrict (珊瑚街道)
- Quhe Subdistrict (曲河街道)
- Langjiaoshan Subdistrict (岚角山街道)

8 towns

- Huaqiaojie (花桥街镇)
- Puliqiao (普利桥镇)
- Niujiaoba (牛角坝镇)
- Gaoxishi (高溪市镇)
- Gaoyangsi (黄阳司镇)
- Shanglingqiao (上岭桥镇)
- Yitang (伊塘镇)
- Caishi (蔡市镇)

1 township

- Yangcundian Township (杨村甸乡)
