= Longquan, Xintian =

Town in Xintian County, Hunan, China

Longquan 龙泉镇
- Town
- Location in Hunan
- Coordinates: 25°54′26″N 112°13′00″E
- Country: People's Republic of China
- Province: Hunan
- Prefecture-level city: Yongzhou
- County: Xintian County
- Time zone: UTC+8 (China Standard)

Longquan Town (Chinese: 龙泉镇; pinyin: Lóngquán Zhèn) is a town and the county seat in the central Xintian County, Hunan, China. The town was reformed through the amalgamation of 28 villages of 6 towns and townships to it on November 20, 2015. It has an area of 203.49 km^{2} (78.57 sq mi) with a population of 118,600 (as of 2015 end). Its seat is at Zhongshan Community (Chinese: 中山社区).
