= Wanggezhuang =

Wanggezhuang 王格庄镇
- Town
- Location in Shandong
- Coordinates: 37°10′06″N 121°24′08″E
- Country: People's Republic of China
- Province: Shandong
- Prefecture-level city: Yantai
- District: Muping
- Time zone: UTC+8 (China Standard)

Wanggezhuang (Chinese: 王格庄镇) is a town in Muping, Yantai, in eastern Shandong province, China.
