= Changhong, Qiyang =

Subdistrict in Qiyang, Yongzhou, Hunan, China

Coordinates: 26°37′23″N 111°49′55″E

Changhong Subdistrict (Chinese: 长虹街道; pinyin: Chánghóng Jiēdào) is a subdistrict and the county seat of Qiyang County in Hunan, China. Located in the north central region of the county, the subdistrict was formed in August 2010. It has an area of 31.8 km^{2} (12.3 sq mi) with a population of 59,000 (as of 2010), and its administrative centre is at Changhong Village (Chinese: 长虹村).
