= Yulindian =

Yulindian 玉林店镇
- Town
- Location in Shandong
- Coordinates: 37°16′38″N 121°37′12″E
- Country: People's Republic of China
- Province: Shandong
- Prefecture-level city: Yantai
- District: Muping
- Time zone: UTC+8 (China Standard)

Yulindian (Chinese: 玉林店镇) is a town in Muping, Yantai, in eastern Shandong province, China.
