= Guanshui, Shandong =

Guanshui 观水镇
- Town
- Location in Shandong
- Coordinates: 37°13′02″N 121°15′51″E
- Country: People's Republic of China
- Province: Shandong
- Prefecture-level city: Yantai
- District: Muping
- Time zone: UTC+8 (China Standard)

Guanshui (Chinese: 观水镇) is a town in Muping, Yantai, in eastern Shandong province, China.
