= Xintian County =

Xintian County 新田县
- County
- Location in Hunan
- Coordinates: 25°54′25″N 112°13′16″E
- Country: People's Republic of China
- Province: Hunan
- Prefecture-level city: Yongzhou

Area
  - Total: 1,003.98 km^{2} (387.64 sq mi)

Population (2010)
  - Total: 329,906
  - Density: 328.598/km^{2} (851.065/sq mi)
- Time zone: UTC+8 (China Standard)
- Postal code: 4258XX

Xintian County (simplified Chinese: 新田县; traditional Chinese: 新田縣; pinyin: Xīntián Xiàn) is a county of Hunan Province, China. It is under the administration of the prefecture-level city of Yongzhou.

Located on the southern part of the province and the west of Yongzhou, the county is bordered to the north by Qiyang County and Changning City, to the east by Guiyang County, to the southeast by Jiahe County, and to the southwest and the west by Ningyuan County. Xintian County covers an area of 1,022.4 km^{2} (394.8 sq mi), and as of 2015, it had a registered population of 431,500 and a permanent resident population of 339,200. The county has 11 towns and one township under its jurisdiction, and the county seat is Longquan (龙泉镇).

== Administrative divisions ==
11 towns

- Dapingtang (大坪塘镇)
- Jiantou (枧头镇)
- Jicun (骥村镇)
- Jinling (金陵镇)
- Jinpen (金盆镇)
- Longquan (龙泉镇)
- Sanjing (三井镇)
- Shiyang (石羊镇)
- Taoling (陶岭镇)
- Xinlong (新隆镇)
- Xinxu (新圩镇)

1 Yao ethnic township

- Menlouxia (门楼下瑶族乡)

== Climate ==
Climate data for Xintian, elevation 224 m (735 ft), (1991–2020 normals, extremes 1981–2010)
Month	Jan	Feb	Mar	Apr	May	Jun	Jul	Aug	Sep	Oct	Nov	Dec	Year
Record high °C (°F)	26.2 (79.2)	31.2 (88.2)	34.3 (93.7)	35.6 (96.1)	36.2 (97.2)	38.2 (100.8)	39.6 (103.3)	40.0 (104.0)	38.0 (100.4)	37.8 (100.0)	33.5 (92.3)	26.7 (80.1)	40.0 (104.0)
Mean daily maximum °C (°F)	10.7 (51.3)	13.7 (56.7)	17.3 (63.1)	23.9 (75.0)	28.1 (82.6)	31.1 (88.0)	34.0 (93.2)	33.4 (92.1)	30.0 (86.0)	25.2 (77.4)	19.8 (67.6)	13.8 (56.8)	23.4 (74.1)
Daily mean °C (°F)	6.8 (44.2)	9.4 (48.9)	13.0 (55.4)	18.9 (66.0)	23.2 (73.8)	26.5 (79.7)	28.9 (84.0)	28.1 (82.6)	25.0 (77.0)	20.0 (68.0)	14.5 (58.1)	8.9 (48.0)	18.6 (65.5)
Mean daily minimum °C (°F)	4.2 (39.6)	6.6 (43.9)	10.1 (50.2)	15.4 (59.7)	19.7 (67.5)	23.2 (73.8)	24.9 (76.8)	24.4 (75.9)	21.5 (70.7)	16.4 (61.5)	10.8 (51.4)	5.6 (42.1)	15.2 (59.4)
Record low °C (°F)	−4.6 (23.7)	−4.8 (23.4)	−1.5 (29.3)	2.4 (36.3)	9.3 (48.7)	13.1 (55.6)	17.1 (62.8)	18.7 (65.7)	11.4 (52.5)	3.2 (37.8)	−1.5 (29.3)	−7.2 (19.0)	−7.2 (19.0)
Average precipitation mm (inches)	72.0 (2.83)	92.2 (3.63)	164.3 (6.47)	170.8 (6.72)	205.6 (8.09)	221.6 (8.72)	134.3 (5.29)	138.7 (5.46)	53.6 (2.11)	58.0 (2.28)	69.6 (2.74)	50.7 (2.00)	1,431.4 (56.34)
Average precipitation days (≥ 0.1 mm)	14.7	14.4	18.9	16.8	16.9	16.3	11.9	13.9	9.0	7.3	9.7	10.3	160.1
Average snowy days	2.7	1.5	0.3	0	0	0	0	0	0	0	0	0.7	5.2
Average relative humidity (%)	80	80	82	80	80	81	73	75	75	73	75	74	77
Mean monthly sunshine hours	59.1	57.5	60.2	97.9	128.4	145.8	231.8	202.4	158.1	134.6	114.9	97.3	1,488
Percentage possible sunshine	18	18	16	26	31	35	55	51	43	38	35	30	33
Source: China Meteorological Administration
