= Shuidao, Shandong =

Shuidao 水道镇
- Town
- Location in Shandong
- Coordinates: 37°10′14″N 121°34′40″E
- Country: People's Republic of China
- Province: Shandong
- Prefecture-level city: Yantai
- District: Muping
- Time zone: UTC+8 (China Standard)

Shuidao (Chinese: 水道镇) is a town in Muping, Yantai, in eastern Shandong province, China.
