= Dong'an chicken =

Chinese chicken dish

- Simplified: 东安鸡
- Traditional: 東安雞
- Cuisine: Hunan cuisine

Dong'an chicken
- Traditional Chinese: 東安雞
- Simplified Chinese: 东安鸡
Transcriptions
Standard Mandarin
- Hanyu Pinyin: Dōng'ānjī
- Wade–Giles: Tung1-an1-chi1

Alternative Chinese name
- Traditional Chinese: 東安子雞
- Simplified Chinese: 东安子鸡
Transcriptions
Standard Mandarin
- Hanyu Pinyin: Dōng'ānzǐjī
- Wade–Giles: Tung1-an1-tzu3-chi1

Guanbao chicken
- Traditional Chinese: 官保雞
- Simplified Chinese: 官保鸡
Transcriptions
Standard Mandarin
- Hanyu Pinyin: Guān Bǎo Jī
- Wade–Giles: Kuan1 Pao3 Chi1

Dong'an chicken (simplified Chinese: 东安鸡; traditional Chinese: 東安雞; pinyin: Dōng'ānjī) is a Chinese cold parboiled chicken dish, flavoured with chili peppers, ground Sichuan peppercorns, white rice vinegar, scallions and ginger. It is named after Dong'an County.

Dong'an chicken is a traditional Hunan dish, which started in the Tang dynasty. In February 1972, when then-U.S. President Richard Nixon visited China, Mao Zedong entertained Nixon with Hunan dishes such as Dong'an chicken at a banquet.

It has evolved through three dynasties, named "mature vinegar chicken" in the Western Jin dynasty, "Guanbao chicken" in the late Qing dynasty, and "Dong'an chicken" in the Republic of China.
