= Qiyang =

Qiyang 祁阳市 Kiyang
- County-level city
- Location in Hunan
- Coordinates: 26°34′48″N 111°50′28″E
- Country: People's Republic of China
- Province: Hunan
- Prefecture-level city: Yongzhou
- County seat: Changhong Subdistrict

Area
  - Total: 2,538.20 km^{2} (980.00 sq mi)

Population (2020)
  - Total: 832,813
  - Density: 328.112/km^{2} (849.805/sq mi)
- Time zone: UTC+8 (China Standard)
- Postal code: 4261XX
- Languages: Qiyang dialect, Standard Chinese

Qiyang (simplified Chinese: 祁阳市; traditional Chinese: 祁陽市; pinyin: Qíyáng Shì) is a county-level city of Hunan Province, China. It is under the administration of the prefecture-level city of Yongzhou.

Located on the south central part of the province, it is adjacent to the city proper of Yongzhou. The county is bordered to the north and the northeast by Qidong County, to the east by Changning City, to the south by Xintian and Ningyuan Counties, and to the southwest and the west by Shuangpai County, Lingling and Lengshuitan Districts. Qiyang County covers 2,538 km^{2} (980 sq mi). It has a registered population of 1,061,000 and has a permanent resident population of 879,900. The county has 20 towns, 3 townships and 3 subdistricts under its jurisdiction, and the county seat is Changhong Subdistrict (长虹街道).

== Administrative divisions ==
3 subdistricts

- Changhong (长虹街道)
- Longshan (龙山街道)
- Wuxi (浯溪街道)

20 towns

- Babao (八宝镇)
- Baishui (白水镇)
- Dacundian (大村甸镇)
- Dazhongqiao (大忠桥镇)
- Gongjiaping (龚家坪镇)
- Guanyinshan (观音滩镇)
- Huangnitang (黄泥塘镇)
- Jinbaotang (进宝塘镇)
- Jindong (金洞镇)
- Lijiaping (黎家坪镇)
- Maozhu (茅竹镇)
- Meixi (梅溪镇)
- Panshi (潘市镇)
- Qiliqiao (七里桥镇)
- Sankoutang (三口塘镇)
- Wenfu (文富镇)
- Wenmingpu (文明铺镇)
- Xiamadu (下马渡镇)
- Xiaojia (肖家镇)
- Yangjiaotang (羊角塘镇)

2 townships

- Fenghuang (凤凰乡)
- Shiguyuan (石鼓源乡)

1 Yao ethnic township

- Shaibeitan (晒北滩瑶族乡)

== Climate ==
Climate data for Qiyang, elevation 113 m (371 ft), (1991–2020 normals, extremes 1981–2010)
Month	Jan	Feb	Mar	Apr	May	Jun	Jul	Aug	Sep	Oct	Nov	Dec	Year
Record high °C (°F)	27.3 (81.1)	32.3 (90.1)	35.5 (95.9)	36.5 (97.7)	36.7 (98.1)	38.0 (100.4)	40.2 (104.4)	41.7 (107.1)	39.4 (102.9)	37.4 (99.3)	33.7 (92.7)	25.5 (77.9)	41.7 (107.1)
Mean daily maximum °C (°F)	10.1 (50.2)	13.0 (55.4)	17.1 (62.8)	23.7 (74.7)	28.2 (82.8)	31.3 (88.3)	34.7 (94.5)	34.0 (93.2)	30.1 (86.2)	24.9 (76.8)	19.2 (66.6)	13.1 (55.6)	23.3 (73.9)
Daily mean °C (°F)	6.8 (44.2)	9.2 (48.6)	13.0 (55.4)	19.1 (66.4)	23.6 (74.5)	27.1 (80.8)	30 (86)	29.2 (84.6)	25.5 (77.9)	20.2 (68.4)	14.6 (58.3)	9.0 (48.2)	18.9 (66.1)
Mean daily minimum °C (°F)	4.5 (40.1)	6.6 (43.9)	10.3 (50.5)	15.9 (60.6)	20.3 (68.5)	24.0 (75.2)	26.5 (79.7)	25.8 (78.4)	22.2 (72.0)	17.0 (62.6)	11.5 (52.7)	6.2 (43.2)	15.9 (60.6)
Record low °C (°F)	−4.0 (24.8)	−5.2 (22.6)	0.1 (32.2)	3.5 (38.3)	10.6 (51.1)	14.6 (58.3)	19.2 (66.6)	19.5 (67.1)	13.3 (55.9)	5.2 (41.4)	−0.2 (31.6)	−5.6 (21.9)	−5.6 (21.9)
Average precipitation mm (inches)	77.3 (3.04)	86.0 (3.39)	151.1 (5.95)	146.8 (5.78)	182.2 (7.17)	190.7 (7.51)	117.7 (4.63)	137.1 (5.40)	61.7 (2.43)	60.7 (2.39)	73.1 (2.88)	54.3 (2.14)	1,338.7 (52.71)
Average precipitation days (≥ 0.1 mm)	15.3	14.6	18.5	17.0	16.1	14.9	10.6	11.3	8.8	8.6	10.6	10.5	156.8
Average snowy days	3.1	1.7	0.3	0	0	0	0	0	0	0	0	0.8	5.9
Average relative humidity (%)	79	79	81	78	77	78	70	72	73	73	75	74	76
Mean monthly sunshine hours	50.0	50.5	66.0	103.3	132.9	143.8	231.6	199.2	145.1	118.3	102.6	84.8	1,428.1
Percentage possible sunshine	15	16	18	27	32	35	55	50	40	33	32	26	32
Source: China Meteorological Administration
