= Lei Yingchuan =

Chinese soldier (1957–1979)

- Native name: 雷应川
- Born: 1957; Jiangyong, Hunan, China
- Died: 22 February 1979 (aged 21–22) Northern Vietnam †
- Buried: Martyrs Cemetery; Longzhou, Guangxi, China
- Allegiance: People's Republic of China
- Branch: People's Liberation Army Ground Force
- Service years: 1977–1979
- Rank: Squad leader
- Conflicts: Sino-Vietnamese War †
- Awards: Meritorious Service Medal, 1st class Title 'Combat Hero'

Lei Yingchuan (Chinese: 雷应川; pinyin: Léi Yīngchuān; 1957 – 22 February 1979) was a Chinese soldier in the People's Liberation Army of Yao ethnicity. He was posthumously awarded for his actions during the 1979 Sino-Vietnamese War.

== Early life ==
Lei was born on 1957 in Lanxi Yao township in Jiangyong County in Yongzhou, Hunan, China. After graduating from high school, he took part in industrial production. In August 1972, at the age of 15, Lei Yingchuan rescued a young girl from drowning after she fell into a pond. In 1976, he began work at a power station. That summer, following flash floods that washed timber downstream from the mountains, he participated in recovery efforts. In the winter of the same year, flooding caused mud and debris to block the power station’s turbine blades, suspending operations. He entered a drainage channel, crawled through a 36-metre pipeline, and worked for three hours beneath the turbine to clear the obstruction and restore power generation. On the same year he joined the Communist Youth League of China.

== Military career ==
In the spring of 1977, Lei enlisted in the People's Liberation Army Ground Force. He later served as squad leader of the Eighth Squad and Ninth Squad of the Third Platoon, Eighth Company, Third Regiment of the Guangzhou Garrison Command in Guangzhou Military Region, as well as head of the unit’s cooking squad. In February 1979, following the outbreak of the Sino-Vietnamese War, he requested assignment to the front line and was approved, serving as leader of an assault squad.

=== Sino-Vietnamese war ===
At around 5:00 a.m. on 27 February 1979, Lei led his assault squad up a mountain under cover of darkness and seized an unnamed high ground on the western side of the China–Vietnam border. The unit engaged Vietnamese forces, resulting in six Vietnamese casualties, and crossed the first line of trenches. During the advance, he was hit by gunfire in the leg on three occasions and suffered severe bleeding. Despite his injuries, he continued to lead his soldiers forward and pressed on to capture the second trench. At a bend in a communication trench, he was struck again, sustaining a shoulder wound. Two soldiers attempted to evacuate him, but he refused and ordered them to continue the advance. Shortly thereafter, a grenade detonated near him, severely injuring both of his lower legs. Having sustained multiple gunshot wounds and serious injuries, he lost consciousness. After regaining consciousness, he observed a Vietnamese command post located more than ten metres away and, despite his condition, crawled toward it and destroyed it with a grenade. After the battle, the soldiers under his command looked for him until they found his dead body in the ruins of the Vietnamese command post.

He was buried with military honors at the Martyrs Cemetery in Longzhou County, Guangxi, China.

== Honors ==
After his death the party committee of the army posthumously recognized him as a full member of the Chinese Communist Party, and the Central Military Commission posthmously awarded him the title "Combat Hero" and Meritorious Service Medal (first class). A statue honoring him is located at his birthplace in Lanxi Yao township.
