= Dong'an County =

Dong'an County 东安县 Tungan
- County
- Location in Hunan
- Coordinates: 26°23′49″N 111°18′00″E
- Country: People's Republic of China
- Province: Hunan
- Prefecture-level city: Yongzhou
- Seat: Baiyashi

Area
  - Total: 2,210.94 km^{2} (853.65 sq mi)

Population (2010)
  - Total: 543,453
  - Density: 245.802/km^{2} (636.624/sq mi)
- Time zone: UTC+8 (China Standard)
- Postal code: 4259XX

Dong'an County (simplified Chinese: 东安县; traditional Chinese: 東安縣; pinyin: Dōng'ān Xiàn; lit. 'Eastern peace') is a county of Hunan Province, China, it is under the administration of Yongzhou prefecture-level City.

Located on the south central margin of the province, it is adjacent to the eastern border of Guangxi. The county is bordered to the north by Shaoyang County, to the east by Lengshuitan District, to the south by Lingling District, Quanzhou County of Guangxi, to the west and the northwest by Xinning County. Dong'an County covers 2,204 km^{2} (851 sq mi), as of 2015, It had a registered population of 643,179. The county has 13 towns and 2 townships under its jurisdiction, the county seat is Baiyashi (白牙市镇).

Dong'an County is the source place of Dong'an Chicken (东安子鸡), which is one of well-known Hunan foods.

== Administrative divisions ==
13 towns

- Baiyashi (白牙市镇)
- Damiaokou (大庙口镇)
- Dasheng (大盛镇)
- Duanqiaopu (端桥铺镇)
- Hengtang (横塘镇)
- Huaqiao (花桥镇)
- Jingtouyu (井头圩镇)
- Luhongshi (芦洪市镇)
- Lumaqiao (鹿马桥镇)
- Nanqiao (南桥镇)
- Shiqishi (石期市镇)
- Xinyujiang (新圩江镇)
- Zixishi (紫溪市镇)

2 townships

- Shuiling (水岭乡)
- Shuiyan (川岩乡)

== Climate ==
Climate data for Dong'an, elevation 169 m (554 ft), (1991–2020 normals, extremes 1981–2010)
Month	Jan	Feb	Mar	Apr	May	Jun	Jul	Aug	Sep	Oct	Nov	Dec	Year
Record high °C (°F)	26.5 (79.7)	31.3 (88.3)	35.3 (95.5)	35.9 (96.6)	36.1 (97.0)	38.1 (100.6)	39.5 (103.1)	40.6 (105.1)	38.4 (101.1)	37.0 (98.6)	33.1 (91.6)	25.5 (77.9)	40.6 (105.1)
Mean daily maximum °C (°F)	10.0 (50.0)	12.8 (55.0)	16.9 (62.4)	23.4 (74.1)	27.6 (81.7)	30.6 (87.1)	33.8 (92.8)	33.4 (92.1)	29.7 (85.5)	24.5 (76.1)	18.9 (66.0)	12.9 (55.2)	22.9 (73.2)
Daily mean °C (°F)	6.6 (43.9)	9.0 (48.2)	12.8 (55.0)	18.7 (65.7)	23.0 (73.4)	26.3 (79.3)	28.8 (83.8)	28.2 (82.8)	24.8 (76.6)	19.6 (67.3)	14.1 (57.4)	8.6 (47.5)	18.4 (65.1)
Mean daily minimum °C (°F)	4.3 (39.7)	6.5 (43.7)	10.0 (50.0)	15.4 (59.7)	19.6 (67.3)	23.2 (73.8)	25.0 (77.0)	24.6 (76.3)	21.5 (70.7)	16.4 (61.5)	10.9 (51.6)	5.8 (42.4)	15.3 (59.5)
Record low °C (°F)	−3.5 (25.7)	−4.0 (24.8)	−0.1 (31.8)	3.6 (38.5)	9.3 (48.7)	14.5 (58.1)	18.7 (65.7)	18.8 (65.8)	13.2 (55.8)	4.6 (40.3)	0.6 (33.1)	−5.3 (22.5)	−5.3 (22.5)
Average precipitation mm (inches)	71.0 (2.80)	82.3 (3.24)	132.9 (5.23)	140.7 (5.54)	210.1 (8.27)	211.4 (8.32)	142.2 (5.60)	140.6 (5.54)	63.2 (2.49)	66.6 (2.62)	69.9 (2.75)	51.6 (2.03)	1,382.5 (54.43)
Average precipitation days (≥ 0.1 mm)	15.2	14.7	18.8	16.5	17.0	15.6	11.8	12.4	9.0	9.2	10.9	10.9	162
Average snowy days	3.2	1.8	0.3	0	0	0	0	0	0	0	0.1	0.7	6.1
Average relative humidity (%)	80	80	82	80	80	81	75	76	76	75	77	76	78
Mean monthly sunshine hours	51.0	51.1	63.3	98.7	121.0	125.2	217.3	189.2	137.7	116.0	103.7	88.1	1,362.3
Percentage possible sunshine	15	16	17	26	29	30	52	47	38	33	32	27	30
Source: China Meteorological Administration
