= Longquan, Yantai =

Longquan 龙泉镇
- Town
- Location in Shandong
- Coordinates: 37°19′59″N 121°46′42″E
- Country: People's Republic of China
- Province: Shandong
- Prefecture-level city: Yantai
- District: Muping
- Time zone: UTC+8 (China Standard)

Longquan (Chinese: 龙泉镇) is a town in Muping, Yantai, in eastern Shandong province, China.
