= Hunan Yongzhou No.1 High School =

- 湖南省永州市第一中学 永州市第一中学
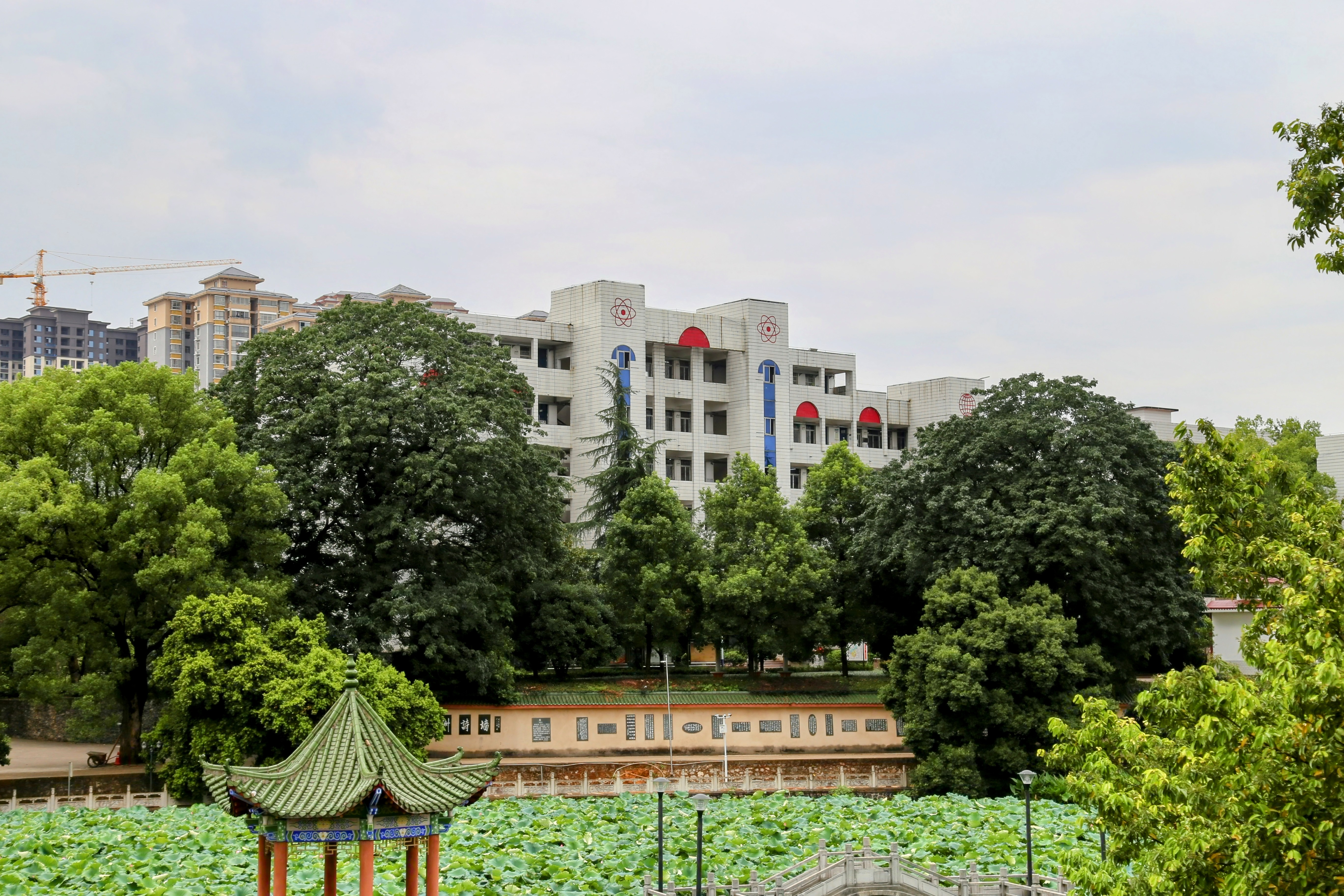
- Artificial Lake, July 2023

Location
- 79 Huilongta Road, Lingling District, Yongzhou, Hunan, 425000; China; 26°14′39″N 111°36′51″E

Information
- Other names: Yongzhou No.1 High School; No.1 High School of Yongzhou; Yongzhou No.1 High School of Hunan 永州一中
- Type: Comprehensive Public High School
- Motto: Chinese: 自強不息，厚德博學
- Established: 1903
- Grades: 10 to 12
- Gender: coed
- Campus type: Urban

Hunan Yongzhou No.1 High School (Chinese: 湖南省永州市第一中学), commonly known as Yongzhou No.1 High School (Chinese: 永州市第一中学), is a comprehensive public high school in Yongzhou, Hunan Province.

== Overview ==
Hunan Yongzhou No.1 High School was established in 1903, originally as ''永州府官立中学堂''. It is now located at No.79 Huilongta Road, Lingling District, Yongzhou City, Hunan Province. The school occupies a campus of approximately 403 mu (26.9 hectares). Its facilities include canteens, dormitories, laboratories, computer rooms, language rooms, multimedia classrooms, lecture halls, a library, office buildings and a 6,000-square-meter Lida Plaza.

The school motto is "自強不息，厚德博學", which translates as "Constantly strive for self-improvement, be virtuous and knowledgeable".

== Alumni ==
- Li Da - Chinese Marxist philosopher, founding member of Chinese Communist Party, and President of Wuhan University (1952-1966)
