= Nanjing No.1 High School =

School in Nanjing, Jiangsu, China

Nanjing No. 1 High School
- Nanjing, Jiangsu, China

Information
- Established: 1907
- Principal: You Xiaoping
- Staff: 320
- Enrollment: 2,500
- Campus: Urban
- Website: Official site

Nanjing No.1 High School
- Simplified Chinese: 南京市第一中学
Transcriptions
Standard Mandarin
- Hanyu Pinyin: Nánjīng Shì Dìyī Zhōngxué

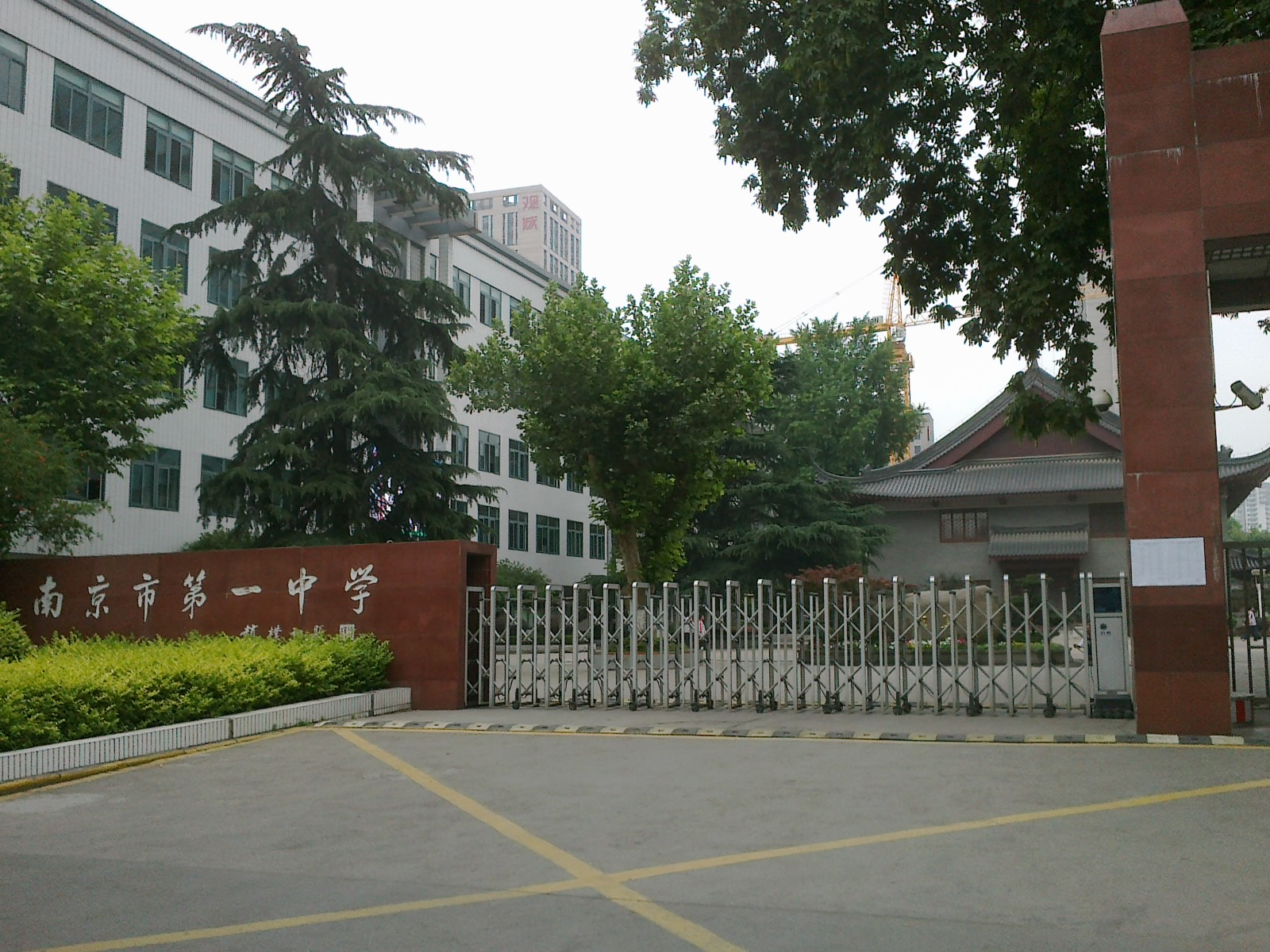
Nanjing No.1 High School entrance

Nanjing No. 1 High School is a high school in Nanjing, Jiangsu, China, located on the bank of the Qinhuai River.

== History ==
The history of Nanjing No. 1 High School dates back to 1907 during the late Qing dynasty. At that time, Sun Shaoyun and three other local leaders established "Chong Wen School" in Nanjing for children from the southern district of Nanjing and provided them a place to study. In 1927, the Nationalist Government decided to set Nanjing as the capital of the Republic of China, and the school was renamed as the Capital City Central Experimental School which was inspired by Cai Yuanpei. It then became the first public middle school in Nanjing.

In the spring of 1927, the National Revolutionary Army occupied southern China. On April 18, Chiang Kai-shek started a national government, with Nanjing as its base. The government declared Nanjing the capital of the Republic of China. After the summer break, Nanjing Municipal Government set up five "experimental" schools in the central, western, eastern, southern, and northern districts respectively. Among them, the central capital experimental school was located at the corner of Zhonghua Avenue and Fuxi Street. The location was the western garden of the governor of Nanjing during the Qing dynasty. From 1902–1903, "Three Rivers Normal School" (now called Nanjing University) was temporarily relocated to this location when the school started operating. Since 1907, Chong Wen School, Jiang Ning First Elementary School, Jiang Ning county junior high school all started at this location.

In the year of 1933, the school was renamed as Nanjing City No. 1 High School.

The land that the school currently occupies was previously used as a garden by a Qing dynasty official.

== Awards ==
Students often participate in mathematics, physics, English, and information technology competitions; seven students won the national first prize, 21 students won provincial first prize, and 74 won provincial second place.

== Accomplishments in Athletics and Music ==
In 2006, the school's symphony orchestra participated in the third national high school arts festival and was awarded second place. The boys' volleyball team won the Jiangsu province high school volleyball tournament championship.

In 2007, the school's symphony orchestra participated in the 36th Vienna International Youth Music Festival, and was awarded second place. The boys' volleyball team won the Jiangsu province high school volleyball tournament championship.

== School Anthem ==
南京一中校歌 Nanjing No. 1 High School Anthem

李清悚 词 Li Qingsong Lyrics
周玲荪 曲 Zhou Lingsun composer

大哉古都秀毓淮钟 Great ancient capital, beautiful River and mountain
巍巍我校石城之中 Our towering school in the Stone Citadel
乐群敬业，朝气葱茏 Friendly, dedicated, and vitality
涵三德兮智仁与勇 Intelligent, humane and brave
做生活兮洩洩融融 Live life harmonily
啊～啊～愿春风广被兮天下为公 Ah~~Ah~~The spring breeze widely republic to whole nation

啊～啊～愿春风广被兮天下为公 Ah~~Ah~~The spring breeze widely republic to whole nation
