= Muping, Yantai =

Muping District 牟平区 Mowping
- District
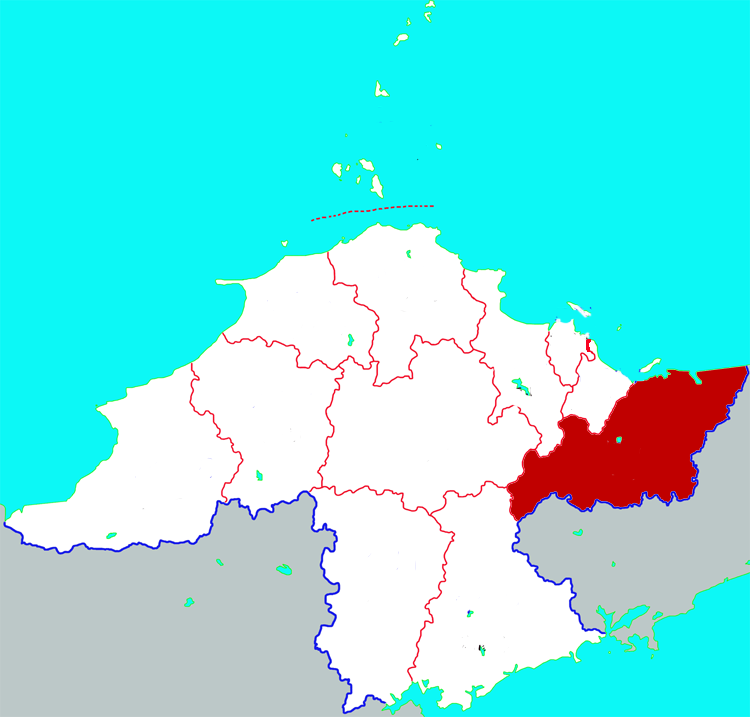
- Location in Yantai

- Location in Shandong
- Coordinates: 37.387°N 121.600°E
- Country: People's Republic of China
- Province: Shandong
- Prefecture-level city: Yantai

Area
  - Total: 1,511 km^{2} (583 sq mi)

Population (2017)
  - Total: 451,000
  - Density: 298/km^{2} (773/sq mi)
- Time zone: UTC+8 (China Standard)
- Postal code: 264100
- Website: www.muping.gov.cn

Muping District (Chinese: 牟平区; pinyin: Mùpíng Qū), formerly also known as Ninghai or Ninghaichow, is a district administered by the prefecture-level city of Yantai, Shandong province, People's Republic of China. It is the easternmost county-level division of Yantai.

== Administrative divisions ==
As of 2012, this district is divided to 3 subdistricts and 10 towns.

Subdistricts

- Ninghai Subdistrict (宁海街道)
- Wenhua Subdistrict (文化街道)
- Yangmadao Subdistrict (养马岛街道)

Towns

- Guanshui (观水镇)
- Wuning (武宁镇)
- Dayao (大窑镇)
- Jianggezhuang (姜格庄镇)
- Longquan (龙泉镇)
- Yulindian (玉林店镇)
- Shuidao (水道镇)
- Jugezhuang (莒格庄镇)
- Gaoling (高陵镇)
- Wanggezhuang (王格庄镇)

== Climate ==
Climate data for Muping District, elevation 39 m (128 ft), (1991–2020 normals, extremes 1991–present)
Month	Jan	Feb	Mar	Apr	May	Jun	Jul	Aug	Sep	Oct	Nov	Dec	Year
Record high °C (°F)	14.5 (58.1)	20.5 (68.9)	28.5 (83.3)	34.0 (93.2)	37.7 (99.9)	40.4 (104.7)	38.1 (100.6)	37.5 (99.5)	34.5 (94.1)	29.9 (85.8)	25.6 (78.1)	17.0 (62.6)	40.4 (104.7)
Mean daily maximum °C (°F)	2.9 (37.2)	5.5 (41.9)	11.1 (52.0)	18.0 (64.4)	24.1 (75.4)	27.8 (82.0)	29.8 (85.6)	29.5 (85.1)	26.2 (79.2)	20.2 (68.4)	12.7 (54.9)	5.5 (41.9)	17.8 (64.0)
Daily mean °C (°F)	−1.4 (29.5)	0.6 (33.1)	5.6 (42.1)	12.1 (53.8)	18.3 (64.9)	22.6 (72.7)	25.5 (77.9)	25.4 (77.7)	21.3 (70.3)	14.9 (58.8)	7.8 (46.0)	1.0 (33.8)	12.8 (55.0)
Mean daily minimum °C (°F)	−5.0 (23.0)	−3.3 (26.1)	1.0 (33.8)	7.1 (44.8)	13.1 (55.6)	18.2 (64.8)	22.1 (71.8)	21.9 (71.4)	17.0 (62.6)	10.1 (50.2)	3.6 (38.5)	−2.5 (27.5)	8.6 (47.5)
Record low °C (°F)	−18.8 (−1.8)	−15.7 (3.7)	−8.8 (16.2)	−4.5 (23.9)	2.2 (36.0)	9.3 (48.7)	15.0 (59.0)	10.1 (50.2)	7.6 (45.7)	−1.1 (30.0)	−6.5 (20.3)	−19.8 (−3.6)	−19.8 (−3.6)
Average precipitation mm (inches)	13.6 (0.54)	14.1 (0.56)	17.4 (0.69)	35.6 (1.40)	47.5 (1.87)	63.9 (2.52)	164.0 (6.46)	142.3 (5.60)	68.1 (2.68)	34.1 (1.34)	38.3 (1.51)	24.4 (0.96)	663.3 (26.13)
Average precipitation days (≥ 0.1 mm)	6.9	5.0	4.3	5.8	7.4	7.8	11.4	10.2	6.9	6.1	6.3	8.7	86.8
Average snowy days	9.3	5.7	2.1	0.3	0	0	0	0	0	0.2	2.8	10.0	30.4
Average relative humidity (%)	66	64	59	57	62	70	80	81	74	68	67	66	68
Mean monthly sunshine hours	162.5	177.1	231.6	245.3	268.0	240.0	205.3	213.2	217.9	209.2	166.4	147.2	2,483.7
Percentage possible sunshine	53	58	62	62	61	55	46	51	59	61	55	50	56
Source: China Meteorological Administration

== Bibliography ==
- Fuller, Joseph V. (1943). Papers relating to the foreign relations of the United States, 1929, Volume II. Washington, D.C.: United States Government Publishing Office.
