= Yunxiao No.1 High School of Fujian =

Yunxiao No.1 Middle School of Fujian
- 福建省云霄第一中学
- No. 42 Yunzhang Road, Yunling Zhen, Yunxiao; Fujian province China

Information
- Type: Public High School
- Motto: Tenacious of Purpose, Broad of Mind and Vigorous of Endurance(笃志弘毅)
- Established: in 1907
- Website: www.fjyxyz.com

Yunxiao No.1 Middle School of Fujian (福建省云霄第一中学) is a public secondary school in Yunxiao, Fujian, China.

Yunxiao No.1 Middle School of Fujian was founded in 1907, is the predecessor of Yunxiao Government-run Second-class Elementary School(官立二等小学堂). In 1953 Provincial Yunxiao High School and Yunxiao County Junior High School was merged into the Fujian Yunxiao High School. In 1958 the original Fujian Yunxiao High School by the Education Department of Fujian Province set called Yunxiao No.1 Middle School of Fujian.

As of 2016, the school campus covers an area of 101.51 mu, with a construction area of 38204.54 square meters. There are 248 faculty members and 148 senior teachers, accounting for 73.27% of the total number of teachers. There are 48 senior high school teaching classes and more than 2400 students.

== School history ==
Qing Guangxu thirty-three years (1907), founded Yunxiao No.1 Middle School of Fujian, the old name for the "Yunxiao County", "official two" and other small schools".

In fifteen years (1926), the name changed to "Yunxiao junior high school".

In thirty-three years (1944), from Yunxiao, Zhaoan, Zhangpu, Ping, Dongshan five counties jointly funded the establishment of the provincial Yunxiao high school.

In 1953, the provincial Senior High School of the sky "and" Yunxiao County Primary School merged into Fujian high school".

In 1958, the original "Fujian Yunxiao middle school" was designated by the Fujian Provincial Department of education as "the first high school in Fujian province".

In 1960, Yunxiao No.1 Middle School of Fujian was listed as the key middle school of Fujian province by the Fujian Provincial Education Department.

In 2006, the "one middle school" was officially designated as "the first grade standard school of Fujian middle school in Fujian province".

== Conditions of Schools ==
=== Hardware facility ===
The school covers an area of 101.51 mu, with a construction area of 38204.54 square meters. There are four teaching buildings, namely, Yucai building, hope building, Chaoyang building and high school building with one touch machine and broadcasting system; there are 3 student apartments, and office building, laboratory building, library and a table tennis hall, a plastic runway stadium, equipped with a state-of-the-art studio and music, art, geography, information technology and two general technology classrooms; comprehensive upstairs is a modern equipment Astronomical Observatory, built in Gigabit Campus Network, the school website and educational resources on demand system, school safety monitoring system. The library has collected 110 thousand books and 100 thousand electronic books. It is a provincial demonstration library. A construction in the hope mountain park, in which the Biological Park (700m2) and the geographical Park (600m2) is the key project.

=== Teacher force ===
School of existing staff of 248 people (2016), high school 202 full-time teachers (7 graduate students), including 4 special teachers, 148 senior teachers, accounting for 73.27% of the total number of teachers, teachers in 57 middle; has 4 provincial excellent teachers, 3 provincial discipline director; 6 provincial backbone teachers, 6 subject leaders at the provincial level, 5 provincial outstanding teacher; 2 Municipal Teachers, 15 academic leaders. There are more than 2500 students, 48 high school classes.

==== College entrance examination results ====
In recent years, the number of on-line undergraduate and the number of on-line new breakthroughs,

In 2008, Fang Yang Fu (studying at Fudan University), Chen Ling (attending Renmin University of China) respectively ranked third and eighth in Zhangzhou science by 642 points and 635 points, and Lin Dezhi ranked first in the County Arts with 588 points;

In 2009, Luo Ming (Tsinghua University) won the city college entrance first, the province's tenth to 699 points, with 634 points among the county Party al first arts.

In 2014, the "one China university entrance examination" exceeded the county's management objectives, the new students on the line 274, over 63 people, on-line rate of 30%; undergraduate on-line 668 people, over 45 people, on-line rate of 72%. 600 points or more have 24 people; among them, Raymond Lam and Zhang Zheyuan classmates respectively with science 650 points, liberal arts 622 respectively won the county entrance examination total score first. Compared with 2013, more than 600 points increased by 13; the number of on-line increase of 41 people, on-line rate increased by 3.27 percentage points; undergraduate on-line increase of 75 people, on-line rate of 5.13 percentage points.

2016 college entrance examination on the line of 249 people, 600 points or more 10 people, the growth target of 930 copies of a student point; undergraduate on-line 732 people, on-line rate of 81%. Lai Yun county science separated to 654 students total score first, Zhangzhou city tenth. Organize students to participate in all kinds of competitions at all levels, have achieved good results. In 2016, the Academic Affairs Office of the school won the honor of "51 pioneer".

== Alumni ==
Fang Zhouzi
