= No. 1 Senior High School in Baotou =

School in Baotou, China

No. 1 Senior High School in Baotou (Chinese: 包头市第一中学) is a high school in Baotou, Inner Mongolia, China. Feng Yuxiang started it in 1925. Baotou No. 1 Middle School is located on Huancheng Road, Donghe District, Baotou City, Inner Mongolia. It was formerly Suiyuan No. 2 Middle School. It was founded by General Feng Yuxiang, the then Northwest Frontier Defense Supervisor, and its first principal was Sun Zerang. It is one of the earliest and longest-established middle schools in the autonomous region. It covers an area of 56,045 square meters. After 2001, the school cancelled the junior high school department and became a pure high school, only recruiting junior high school graduates. After moving to the new site in 2020, the junior high school department was re-established.

The new campus is located east of the ring railway, south of the Donghe section of Qingshan Road, and north of Jingping Road. It was put into use in September 2020. The total investment of the project is about 630 million yuan. It includes high school and junior high school departments, with a total area of 20.9 hectares (about 313.5 acres), a total of 16 single buildings, and a total construction area of 100,800 square meters.

== School name change ==
Suiyuan Special Administrative Region No. 2 Middle School (June 1925 - March 1929)

Suiyuan Provincial No. 2 Middle School (March 1929 - October 1937)

The school was forced to close due to the outbreak of the Anti-Japanese War (October 1937 - March 1946)

Suiyuan Provincial Baotou Middle School (March 1946 - August 1954)

Baotou No. 1 Middle School (August 1954 to present)

== Change of school site ==
Since June 1925, the school address is located at Dongmen Street, Donghe District.

In April 1927, the school address is at the Jesus Church of Luzu Miaoliang and Luzu Miao Cross Street, Donghe District.

After 1929, the school address is at Shiyoufang Lane at the south end of Jinlongwangmiao Street (now the location of Baotou No. 2 Middle School).

After July 1950, the school address is: the former Baotou Normal School, Zhengxin Middle School, Chongzhen Middle School, and Yimeng Middle School were merged into Baotou Middle School, and a new school building was built in Zhengxin Middle School outside the original South Gate (now the current school address).

Officially moved to the new school address (Beiliang District) in 2019
