= Xi'an Gaoxin No.1 High School =

Private secondary school in Xi'an, Shaanxi, China

Xi’an Gaoxin No.1 High School
- Xi'an, Shaanxi; China

Information
- Type: Private secondary school
- Motto: 为时创新，人尽其才
- Established: 1995
- Principal: Wang Shufang
- Staff: 400
- Grades: M-12
- Enrollment: 6000
- Color: White
- Mascot: Gaoxin Xia
- Website: gxyzh.com

Xi'an Gaoxin No.1 High School (Chinese: 西安高新第一中学) is a private-owned secondary school in Xi'an, Shaanxi, China. It was established in 1995.

The school is located in the middle of Xi'an High-tech Industries Development Zone. Under Gaoxin No.1 High School, there are 3 middle schools and 2 high schools. The school has approximately 6000 students and 400 teachers, and staff members.
