= Gaoling, Shandong =

Gaoling 高陵镇
- Town
- Location in Shandong
- Coordinates: 37°17′32″N 121°31′14″E
- Country: People's Republic of China
- Province: Shandong
- Prefecture-level city: Yantai
- District: Muping
- Time zone: UTC+8 (China Standard)

Gaoling (Chinese: 高陵镇) is a town in Muping, Yantai, in eastern Shandong province, China.
