= Tangshan No.1 High School =

- 唐山一中
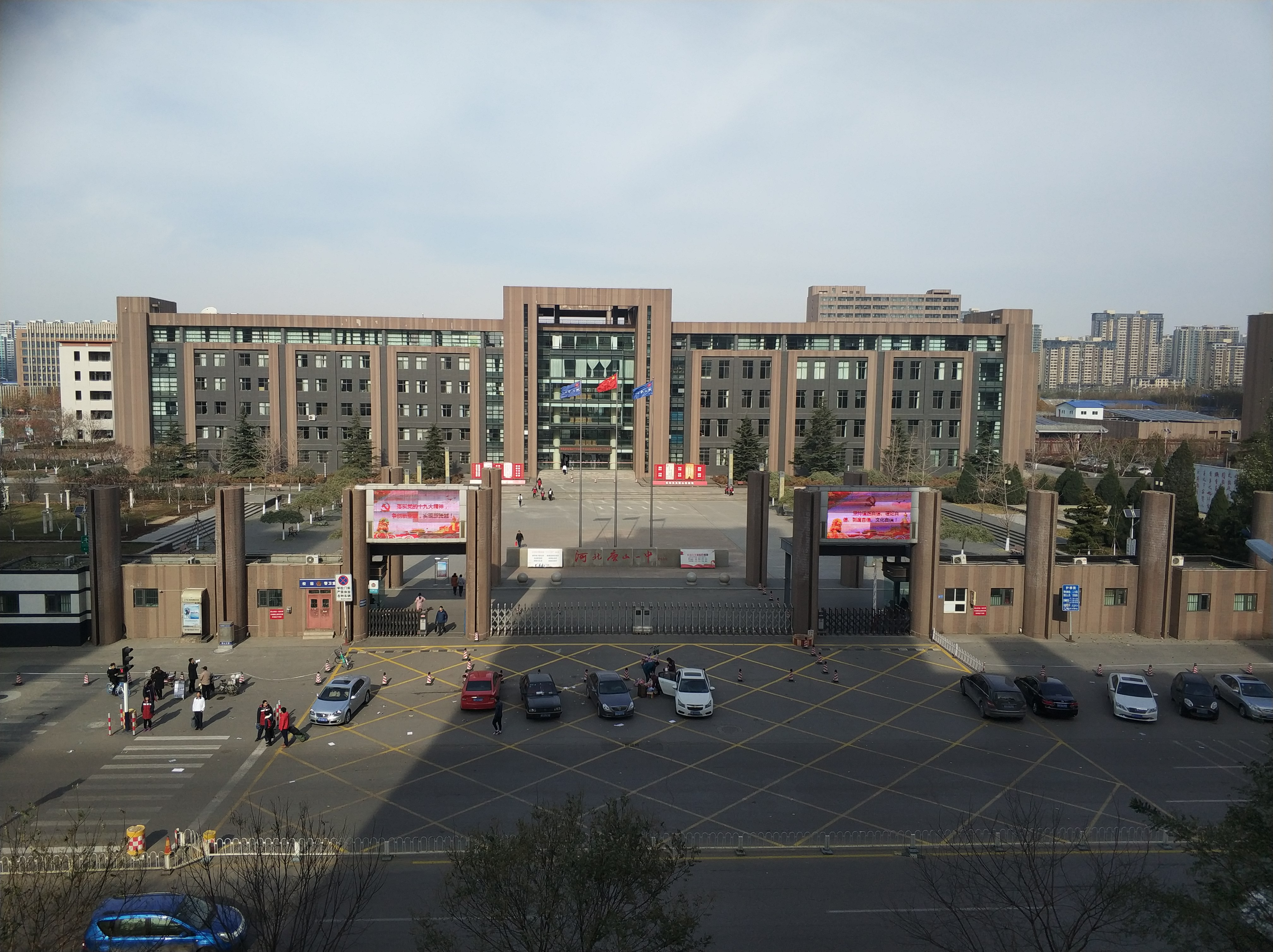

Location
- 369 Xiangyun St., Lubei District; Tangshan, Hebei; China

Information
- Type: Public
- Motto: Rigor, Love, Diligence and Simple
- Established: 1902
- Principal: Bi Huijun (毕会军)
- Staff: 120
- Enrollment: c. 2300
- Song: Song of Tangshan No.1 High School
- Website: Official website

Tangshan No.1 High School (Chinese: 唐山市第一中学, pinyin: Tángshān shì dìyī zhōngxué), commonly abbreviated as Tangshan Yizhong (Chinese: 唐山一中), is a public high school in Hebei province, China. It was established in 1902 by the Yong Ping Government (Tangshan Government) during the Qing Dynasty, known as the Yong Ping Zhongli High School.

== History ==
=== PRC period ===
In 1956, the school was renamed Hebei Provincial Tangshan No. 1 Senior High School(河北省立唐山第一高级中学), and in 1969 it was renamed Hebei Tangshan No. 1 High School, which is its current name.

== School culture ==
=== Title ===
The calligraphic title Tangshan Yizhong (唐山一中, literally Tangshan No.1 High School ) was inscribed by Fei Xiaotong.

=== School emblem ===
The school emblem features the old school gate built in 1902.

=== Motto ===
The school motto is "rigor, love, diligence and simplicity"(严、爱、勤、朴).

=== Anthem ===
The school anthem is Song of Tangshan No.1 High School (唐山一中校歌).

== Campus ==
=== Current campus ===
In August 2010, Tangshan No. 1 High School moved to the new campus on Xiangyun Road, Lubei District.

==== Facilities ====
The school has three school buildings, an office building, a science museum, a library and a gymnasium, a standard 400-meter sports ground and an auditorium. Living facilities include two dormitory buildings, two cafeterias and a store.

== See also ==
- Beijing No.4 High School
- Hengshui High School
- Shijiazhuang No.2 High School
