= Lingling, Yongzhou =

Lingling 零陵区
- District
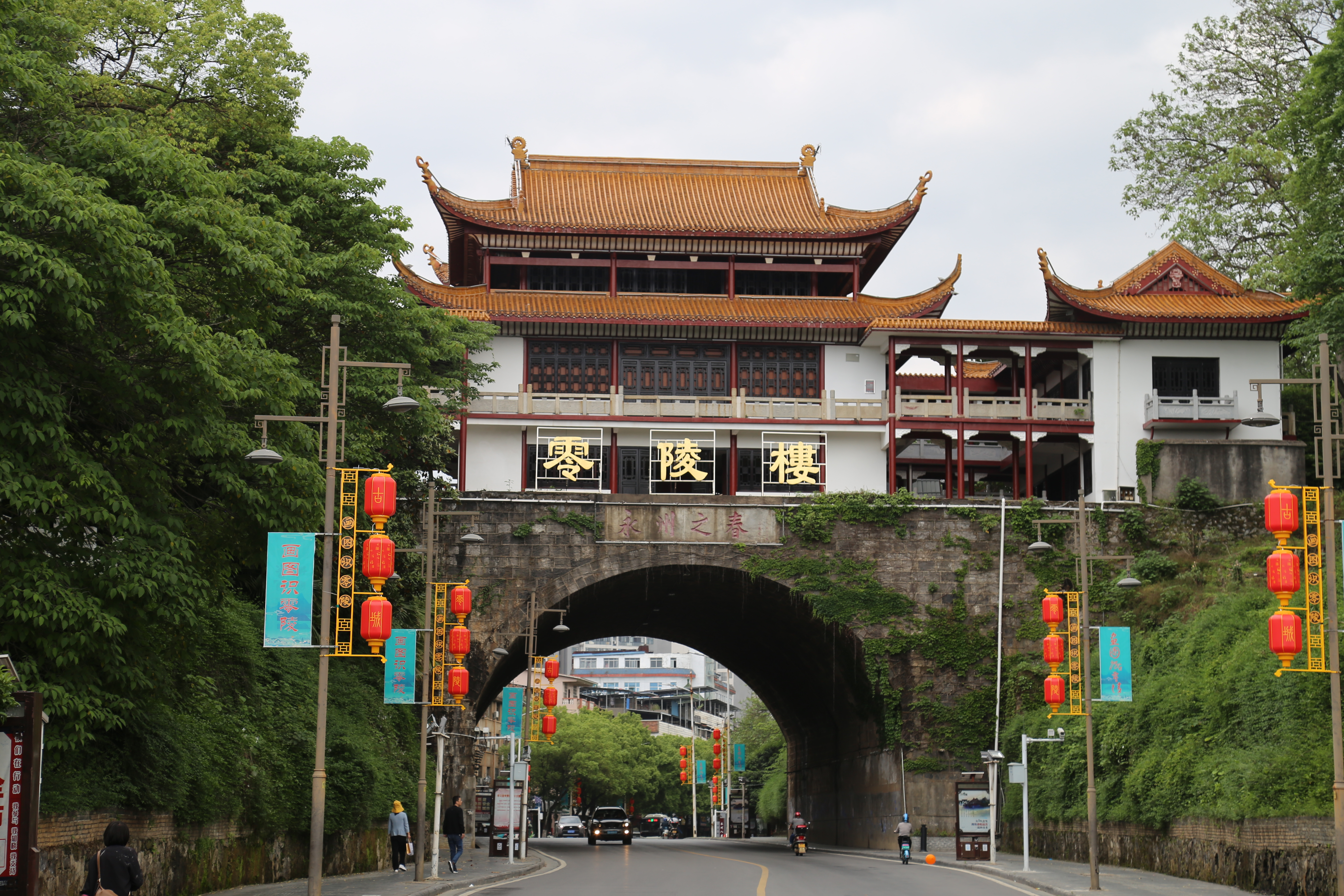
- Lingling Pavilion

- Location in Hunan
- Coordinates: 26°13′17″N 111°37′01″E
- Country: People's Republic of China
- Province: Hunan
- Prefecture-level city: Yongzhou
- District seat: Xujiajing Subdistrict

Area
  - Total: 1,959.11 km^{2} (756.42 sq mi)

Population (2010)
  - Total: 528,637
  - Density: 269.835/km^{2} (698.870/sq mi)
- Time zone: UTC+8 (China Standard)
- Postal code: 425XXX
- Area code: 0746
- Official Language: Standard Chinese
- Dialects: Yongzhou dialect
- Website: www.cnll.gov.cn

Lingling, Yongzhou
- Traditional Chinese: 零陵區
- Simplified Chinese: 零陵区
Transcriptions
Standard Mandarin
- Hanyu Pinyin: Línglíng Qū

Lingling District is one of two urban districts of Yongzhou City, Hunan Province, China. It is located on the south of the city proper, and lies to the eastern border of Guangxi.

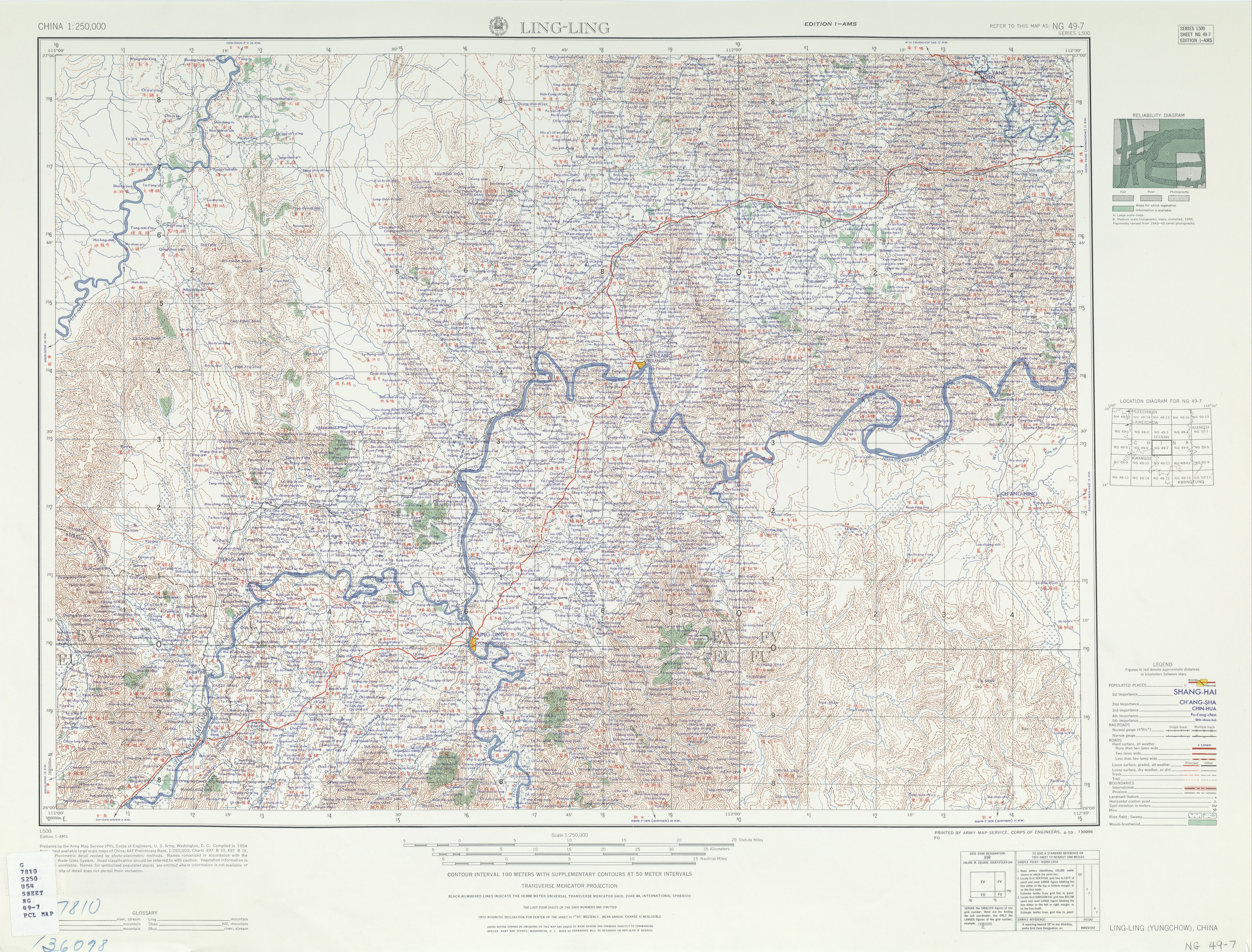
Map including Lingling (labeled as LING-LING (YUNGCHOW) 零陵) (AMS, 1954)

The district is bordered to the north by Dong'an County and Lengshuitan District, to the east by Qiyang County, to the south by Shuangpai County, and to the west by Quanzhou County of Guangxi. Lingling District covers an area of 1,962 km^{2} (758 sq mi), and as of 2015, It had a registered population of 622,400. Lingling District has four subdistricts, 7 towns and 3 townships under its jurisdiction, and the government seat is Xujiajing (徐家井街道).

== Administrative divisions ==
4 subdistricts

- Chaoyang (朝阳街道)
- Nanjindu (南津渡街道)
- Qilidian (七里店街道)
- Xujiajing (徐家井街道)

7 towns

- Fujiaqiao (富家桥镇)
- Huangtianpu (黄田铺镇)
- Lingjiaotang (菱角塘镇)
- Shiyantou (石岩头镇)
- Shuikoushan (水口山镇)
- Youtingxu (邮亭墟镇)
- Zhushan (珠山镇)

3 townships

- Dangdi (凼底乡)
- Daqingping (大庆坪乡)
- Shuzipu (梳子铺乡)

== Climate ==
Climate data for Lingling, elevation 173 m (568 ft), (1991–2020 normals, extremes 1951–present)
Month	Jan	Feb	Mar	Apr	May	Jun	Jul	Aug	Sep	Oct	Nov	Dec	Year
Record high °C (°F)	27.2 (81.0)	31.6 (88.9)	35.7 (96.3)	36.1 (97.0)	39.4 (102.9)	40.0 (104.0)	41.9 (107.4)	43.7 (110.7)	39.4 (102.9)	38.9 (102.0)	33.7 (92.7)	28.8 (83.8)	43.7 (110.7)
Mean daily maximum °C (°F)	9.4 (48.9)	12.4 (54.3)	16.4 (61.5)	23.1 (73.6)	27.4 (81.3)	30.4 (86.7)	33.5 (92.3)	32.8 (91.0)	29.1 (84.4)	23.9 (75.0)	18.3 (64.9)	12.2 (54.0)	22.4 (72.3)
Daily mean °C (°F)	6.4 (43.5)	8.9 (48.0)	12.6 (54.7)	18.7 (65.7)	23.0 (73.4)	26.3 (79.3)	29.0 (84.2)	28.1 (82.6)	24.6 (76.3)	19.5 (67.1)	14.1 (57.4)	8.6 (47.5)	18.3 (65.0)
Mean daily minimum °C (°F)	4.2 (39.6)	6.4 (43.5)	10.0 (50.0)	15.5 (59.9)	19.8 (67.6)	23.5 (74.3)	25.7 (78.3)	24.8 (76.6)	21.4 (70.5)	16.3 (61.3)	11.0 (51.8)	5.9 (42.6)	15.4 (59.7)
Record low °C (°F)	−7.0 (19.4)	−7.0 (19.4)	−0.1 (31.8)	3.7 (38.7)	9.2 (48.6)	13.9 (57.0)	18.7 (65.7)	18.4 (65.1)	12.2 (54.0)	4.5 (40.1)	−0.8 (30.6)	−5.2 (22.6)	−7.0 (19.4)
Average precipitation mm (inches)	84.6 (3.33)	94.3 (3.71)	168.1 (6.62)	164.8 (6.49)	213.2 (8.39)	186.8 (7.35)	128.5 (5.06)	154.3 (6.07)	54.5 (2.15)	66.3 (2.61)	83.8 (3.30)	60.6 (2.39)	1,459.8 (57.47)
Average precipitation days (≥ 0.1 mm)	15.1	14.8	19.3	16.8	16.2	15.2	10.4	12.0	9.2	9.5	10.5	11.3	160.3
Average snowy days	3.1	1.5	0.3	0	0	0	0	0	0	0	0	0.9	5.8
Average relative humidity (%)	79	79	82	79	79	80	72	75	76	75	75	74	77
Mean monthly sunshine hours	54.2	53.4	62.7	94.3	127.0	134.7	220.9	191.7	145.1	123.6	108.6	90.8	1,407
Percentage possible sunshine	16	17	17	25	30	33	53	48	40	35	34	28	31
Source: China Meteorological Administration extremes

== Education ==
=== Secondary school ===
- Hunan Yongzhou No.1 High School

=== Universities and Colleges ===
- Hunan University of Science and Engineering

== Notable people ==
- Li Da - Chinese Marxist philosopher and President of Wuhan University (1952–1966)
- Huaisu - Buddhist monk and calligrapher of the Tang dynasty
- Huang Gai - military general during the late Eastern Han dynasty of China
- Liu Wen - China's first supermodel
