= Qingdao No. 1 High School =

Qingdao No. 1 High School 青岛第一中学
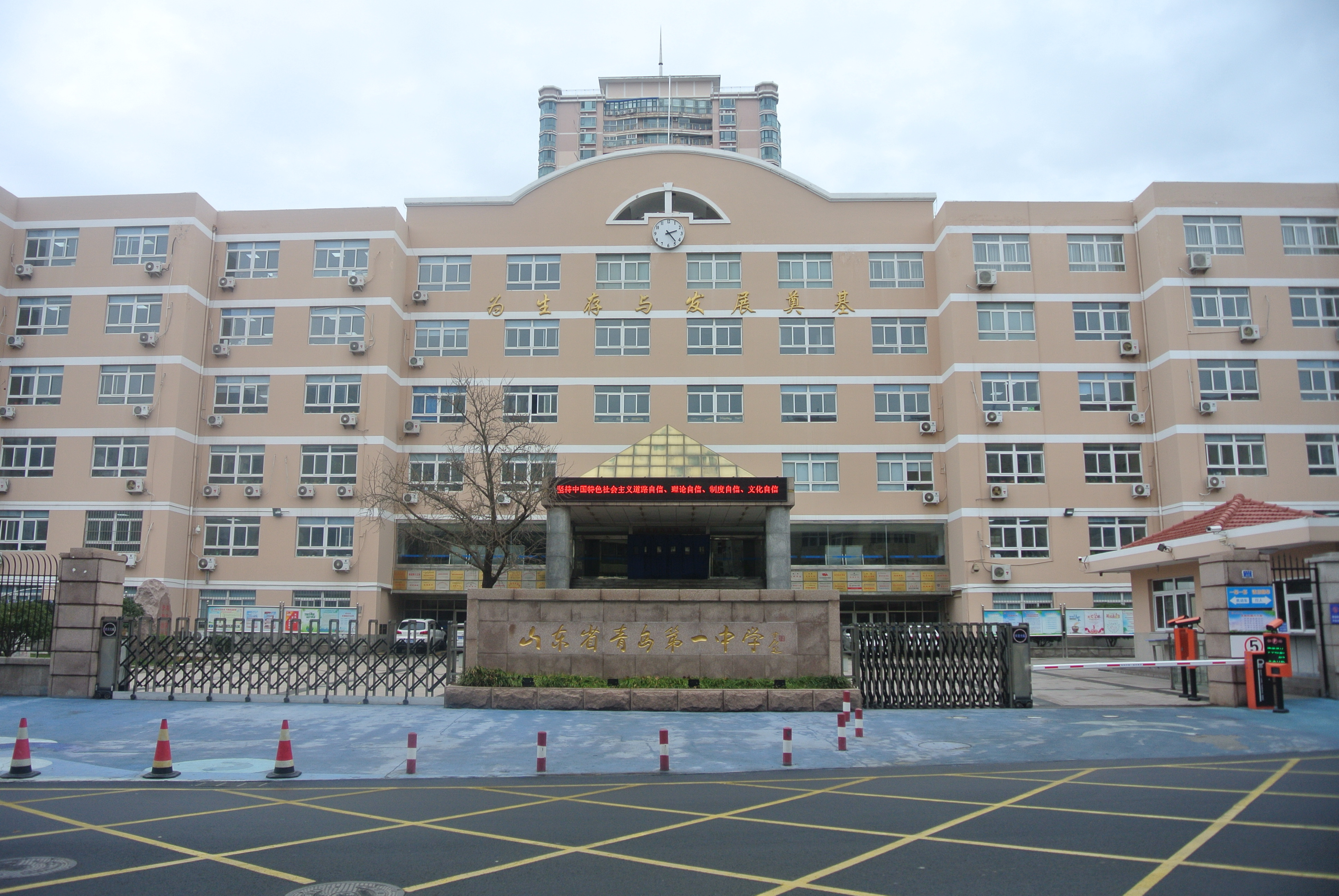
- Qingdao No. 1 Middle School of Shandong Province, 2020

Address
- 46 Shanxian Road, Shinan District, Qingdao, Shandong

Information
- School type: Public high school
- Motto: 为生存与发展奠基 (Laying the foundation for survival and development)
- Opened: 1924
- Principal: Wang Xianjun
- Area: 30,000 square metres (320,000 sq ft)
- Website: www.qdyz.com

Qingdao No. 1 Middle School of Shandong Province (simplified Chinese: 山东省青岛第一中学; traditional Chinese: 山東省青島第一中學) is a high school in Qingdao, Shandong, China.

== School History ==
February 1924 to October 1924, the school was located in Dengzhou Road (登州路).

October 1924 to April 1938, the school was relocated in Zhanshanda Road (湛山大路).

September 1938 to 1952, the school was relocated in Guizhou Road Primary School (贵州路小学).

1952 to now, the school was relocated in Shanxian Road (单县路).

== Notable alumni ==
- Luo Gan
- Zhang Ruimin
- Huang Xiaoming

== See also ==
- Education in the People's Republic of China
- National College Entrance Examination
- Imperial examination
