= Yongzhou =

Yongzhou 永州市 Yungchow
- Prefecture-level city
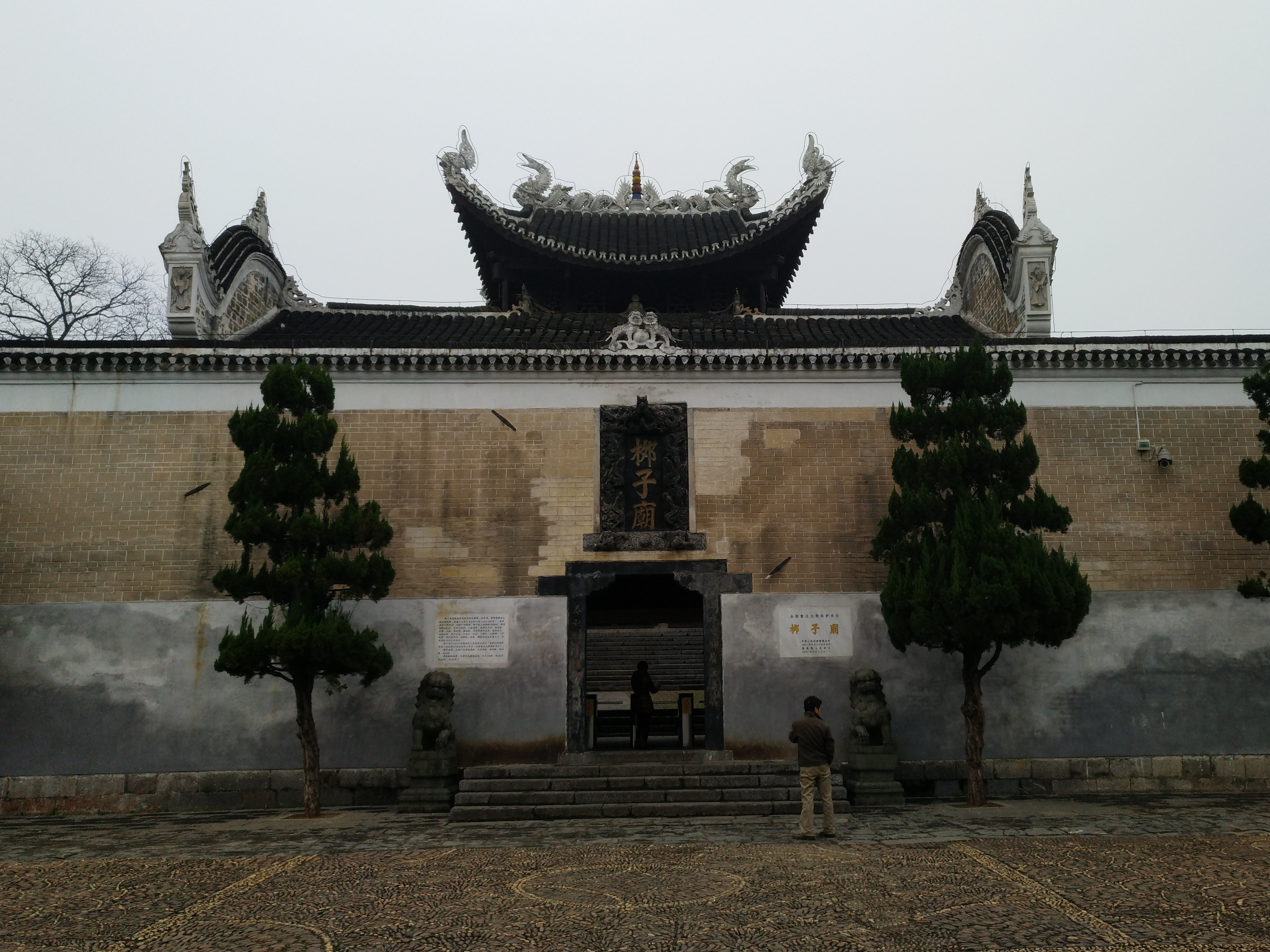
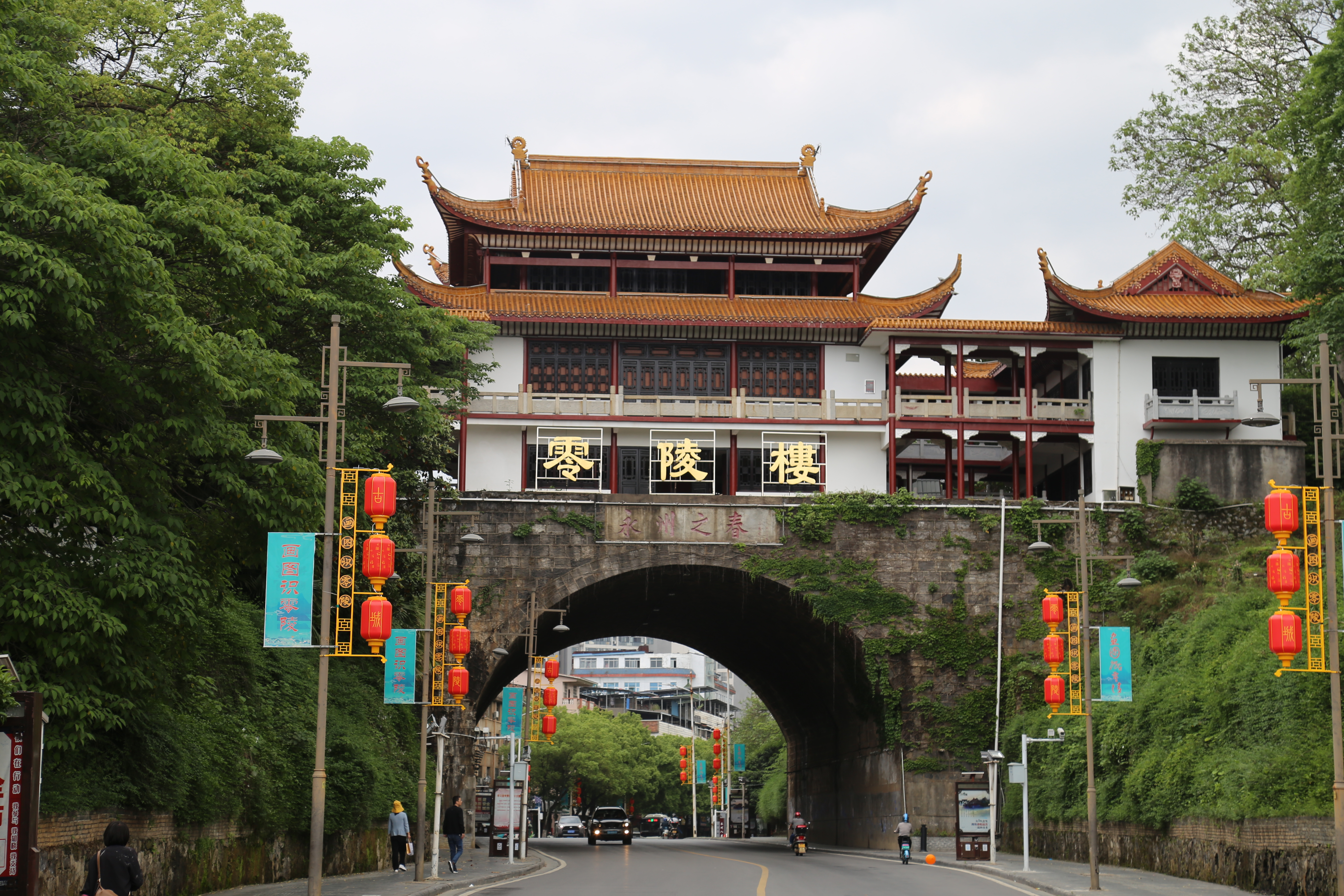
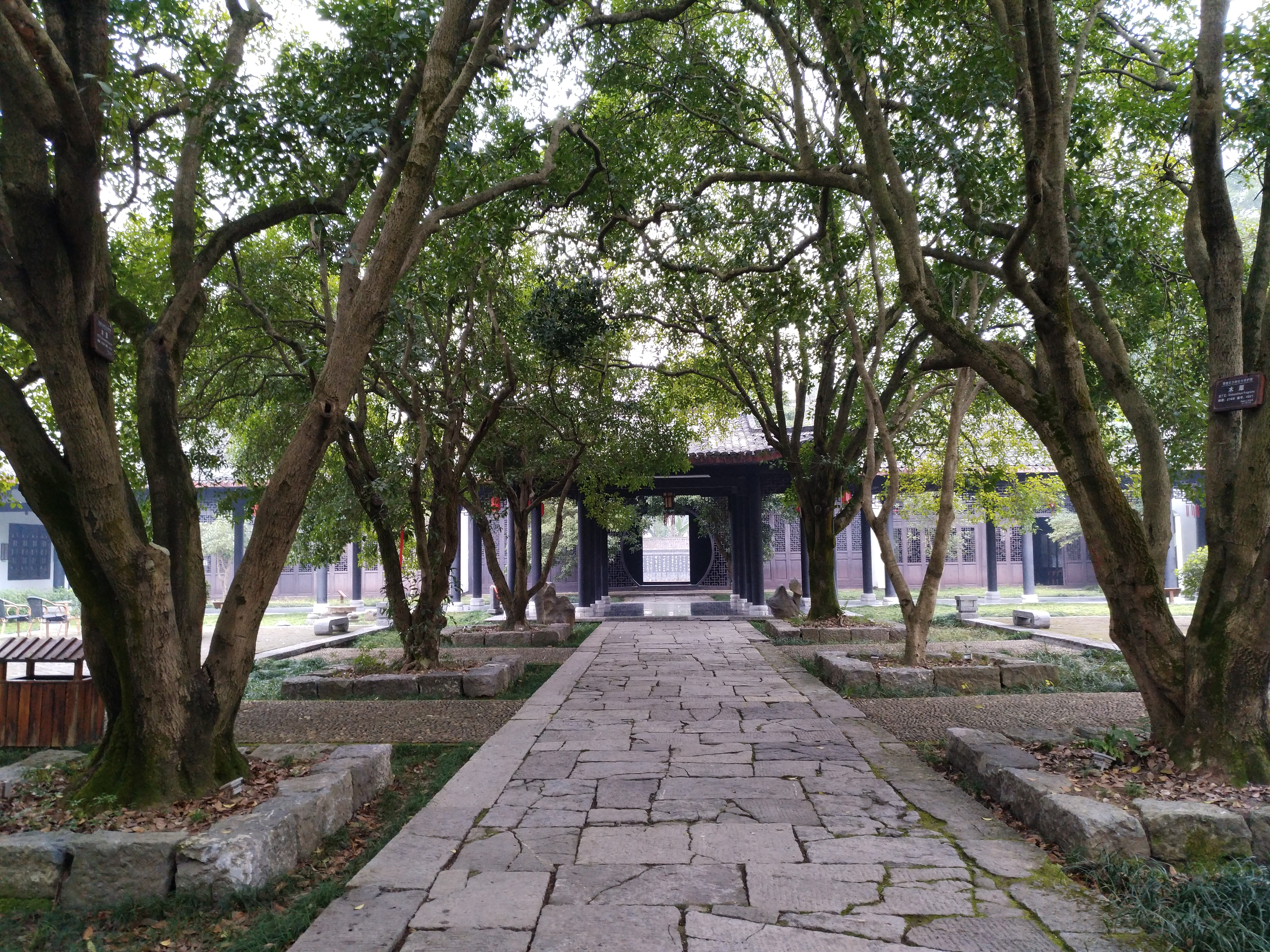
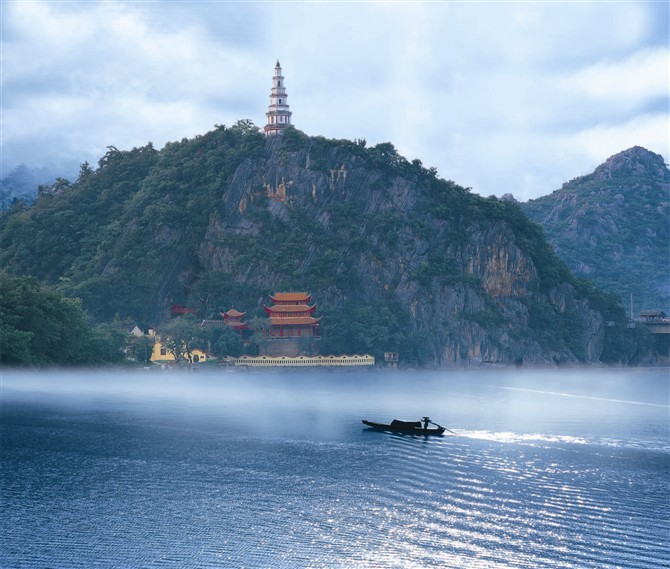
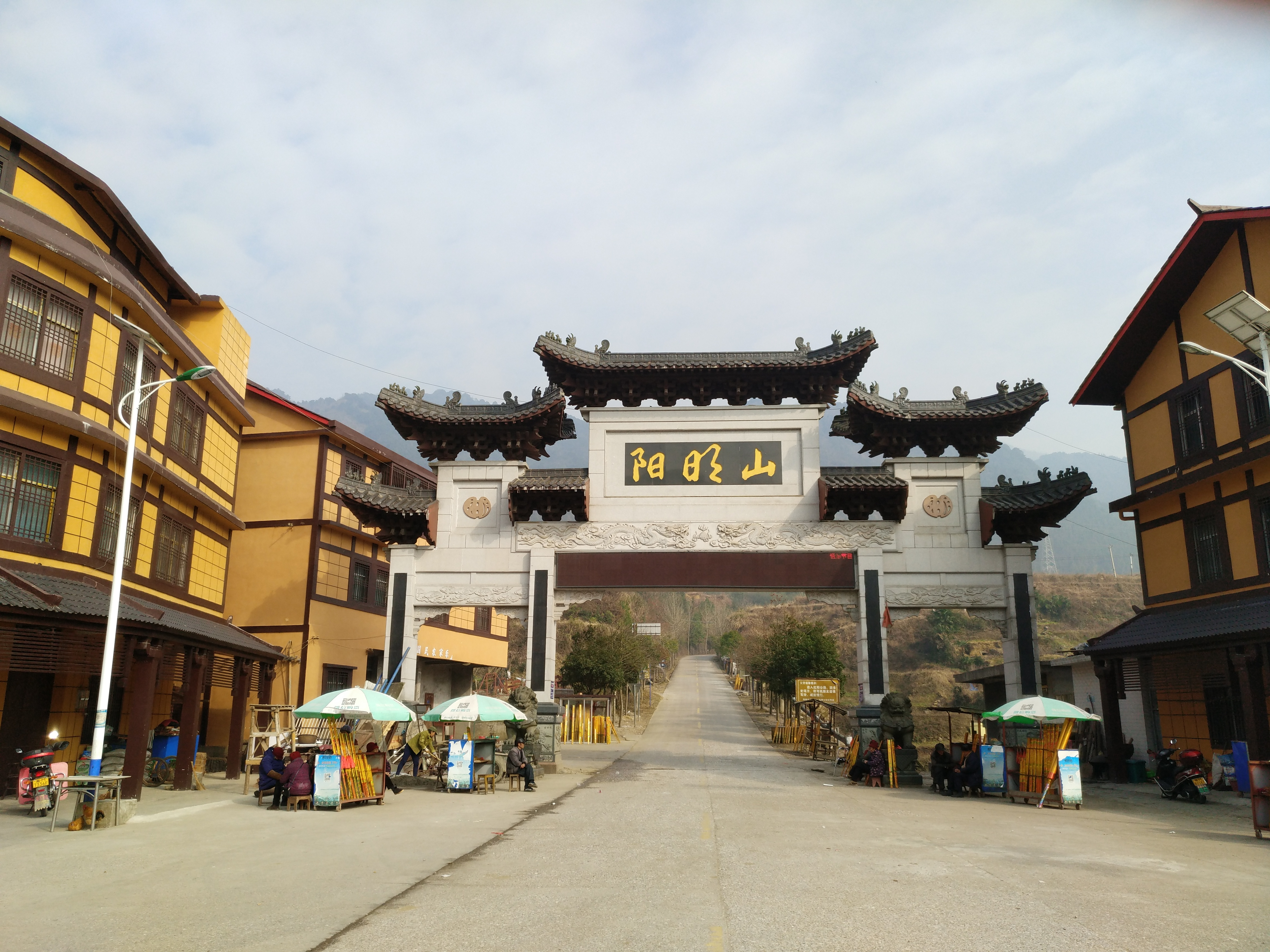
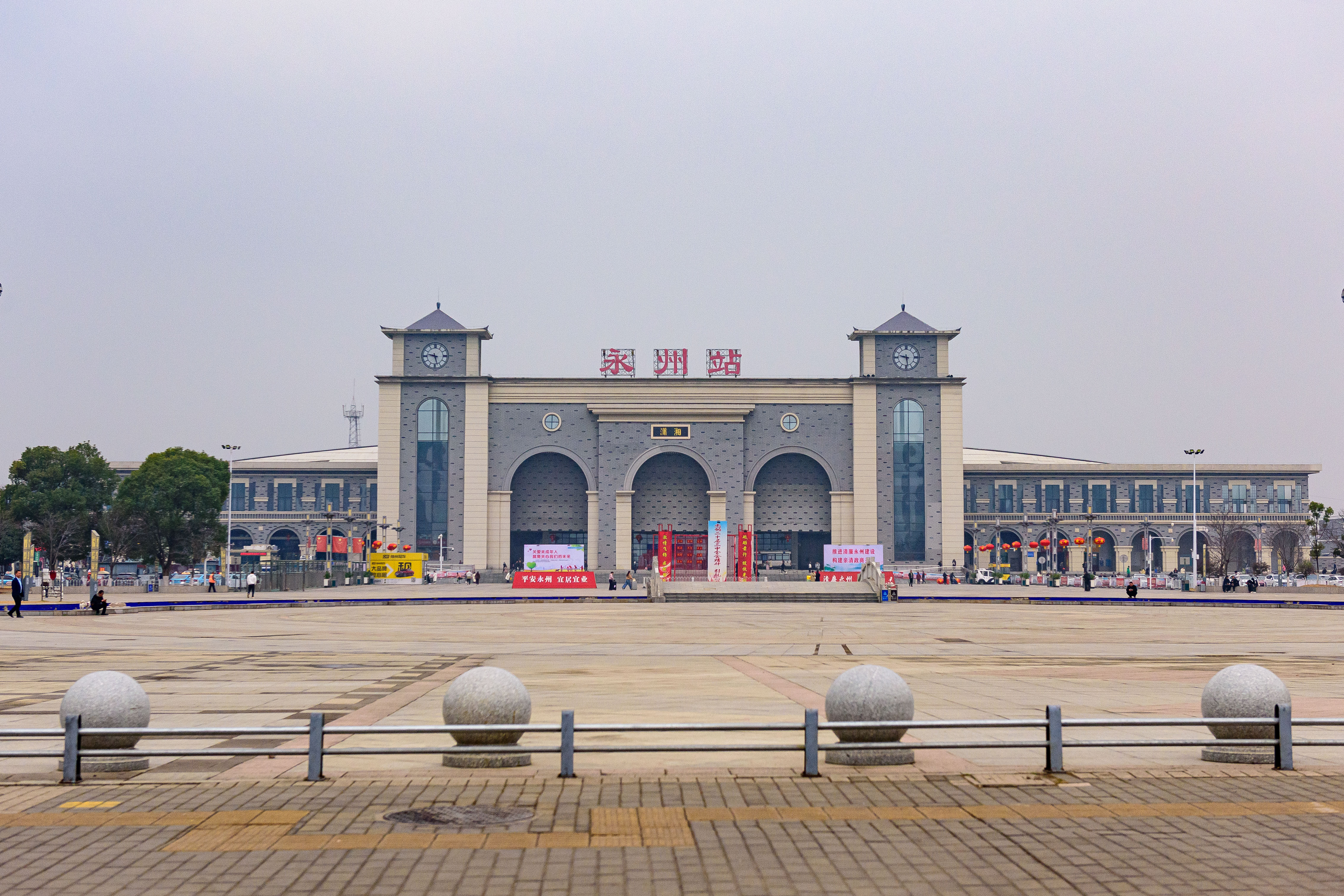
- Liuzi Temple Lingling Pavilion Pingzhou Academy Mount Zhi Yangmingshan National Forest Park Yongzhou Railway Station

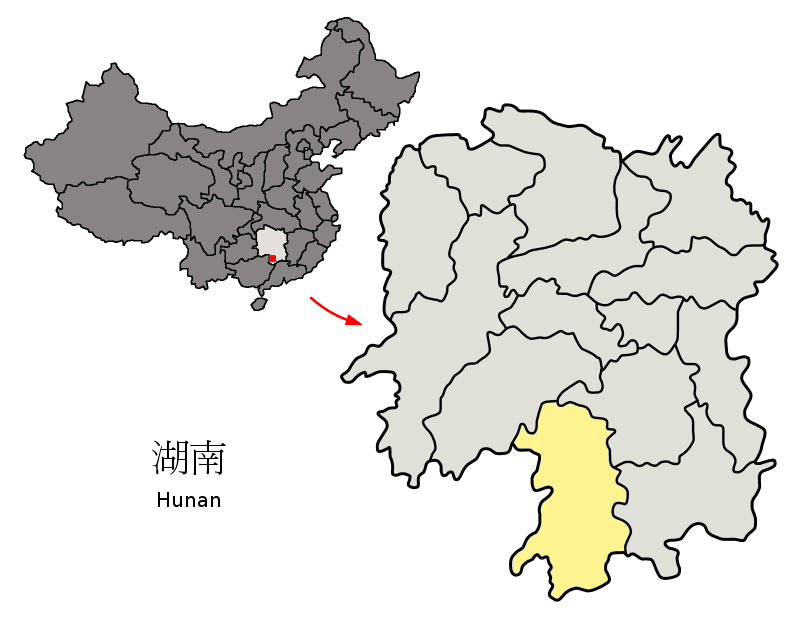
- Location of Yongzhou City jurisdiction in Hunan

- Location of the city centre in Hunan
- Coordinates (Yongzhou municipal government): 26°25′12″N 111°36′47″E
- Country: People's Republic of China
- Province: Hunan
- Seat: Lengshuitan District

Area
  - Prefecture-level city: 22,255.31 km^{2} (8,592.82 sq mi)
  - Urban: 3,177.3 km^{2} (1,226.8 sq mi)
  - Metro: 3,177.3 km^{2} (1,226.8 sq mi)

Population (2020 census)
  - Prefecture-level city: 5,289,824
  - Density: 237.6882/km^{2} (615.6095/sq mi)
  - Urban: 1,146,692
  - Urban density: 360.90/km^{2} (934.73/sq mi)
  - Metro: 1,146,692
  - Metro density: 360.90/km^{2} (934.73/sq mi)

GDP
  - Prefecture-level city: CN¥ 241.0 billion US$ 35.7 billion
  - Per capita: CN¥ 46,853; US$ 6,967
- Time zone: UTC+8 (China Standard)
- Postal code: 425000
- Area code: 0746
- ISO 3166 code: CN-HN-11
- Licence plate prefixes: 湘M
- Official Language: Standard Chinese
- Dialects: Yongzhou dialect Xiangnan Tuhua; Qiyang dialect
- Website: yzcity.gov.cn

Yongzhou
- Chinese: 永州
- Postal: Yungchow
- Literal meaning: "Eternal Prefecture"
Transcriptions
Standard Mandarin
- Hanyu Pinyin: Yǒngzhōu
- Wade–Giles: Yung^{3}-chou^{1}
- IPA: [jʊ̀ŋʈʂóʊ]

Yongzhou (Chinese: 永州; pinyin: Yǒngzhōu) is a prefecture-level city in the south of Hunan province, People's Republic of China, located on the southern bank of the Xiang River, which is formed by the confluence of the Xiao and Xiang Rivers, and bordering Guangdong to the southeast and Guangxi to the southwest. With a history of 2000 years, Yongzhou is one of the four ancient counties in Hunan. Its total area is 22,255.31 square kilometres (8,592.82 sq mi), and at the 2022 Chinese census it had a total population of 5,143,700, of whom 1,146,692 lived in the built-up (or metro) area made of the 2 urban districts.

== History ==
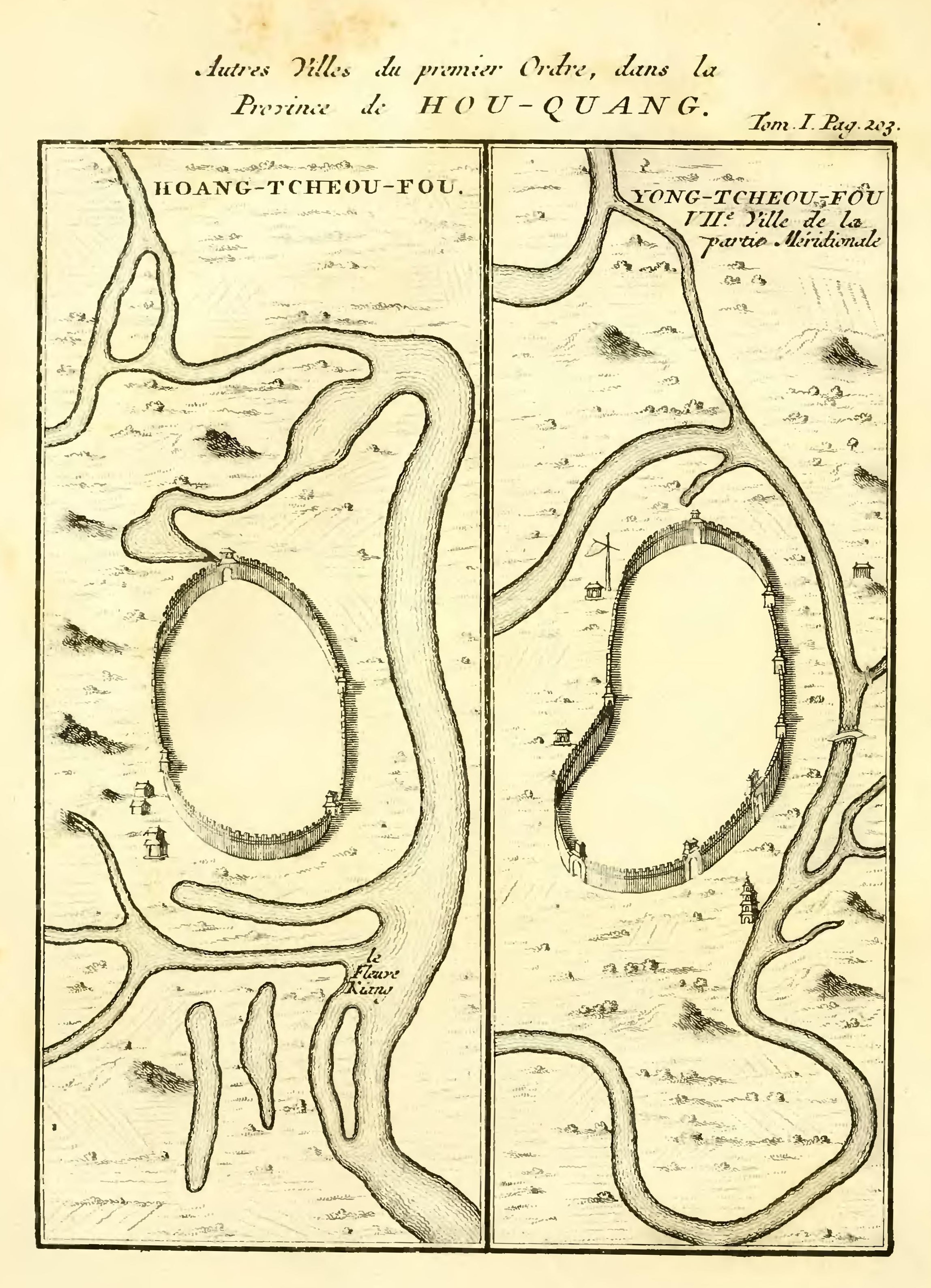
Maps of "Hoang-tcheou-fou" and "Yong-tcheou-fou" in "Hou-quang" from Du Halde's 1735 Description of China, based on accounts by Jesuit missionaries.

During late imperial China, Yongzhou was also the seat of a prefecture.

In 2016, with the approval of the State Council, Yongzhou City was included in the List of National Famous Historical and Cultural Cities in China.

== Geography and climate ==
Yongzhou is the southernmost prefecture-level division of Hunan, and is located at the confluence of the Xiao (Xiaoshui) and Xiang Rivers. Within its borders is the Nan Mountains (Nan Ling), which increases the complexity of climatic variation. It borders Chenzhou to the east, Hezhou (Guangxi), Guilin (Guangxi) and Qingyuan (Guangdong) to the south, and Hengyang and Shaoyang to the north. Its area spans around 22,400 km^{2} (8,650 sq mi).

Yongzhou has a humid subtropical climate (Köppen Cfa), with a 1981–2010 annual mean temperature of 18.03 °C (64.5 °F), although within the prefecture-level city the range during 1971–2000 was 17.6 to 18.6 °C (63.7 to 65.5 °F). Winters are mild and brief, beginning somewhat dry and turning wet and gloomy as the season progresses. Spring is very rainy, especially in May, which is the wettest month. Summer is very hot and humid, with moderate levels of rain, and generous sunshine; on average, July and August are the only two months where the area receives more than half of possible sunshine. Autumn is the driest season. From January to May, on average, more than half of the days each month receive some precipitation. The monthly 24-hour average temperature ranges from 6.1 °C (43.0 °F) in January to 29.0 °C (84.2 °F) in July. The annual precipitation is around 1,426 mm (56 in). With monthly percent possible sunshine ranging from 15% in February and March to 58% in July, the city receives 1,491 hours of sunshine annually.

Climate data for Yongzhou (Lengshuitan District), elevation 193 m (633 ft), (1991–2020 normals, extremes 1971–present)
Month	Jan	Feb	Mar	Apr	May	Jun	Jul	Aug	Sep	Oct	Nov	Dec	Year
Record high °C (°F)	27.1 (80.8)	31.6 (88.9)	35.7 (96.3)	36.0 (96.8)	36.8 (98.2)	37.7 (99.9)	40.1 (104.2)	41.1 (106.0)	39.4 (102.9)	37.0 (98.6)	33.6 (92.5)	26.3 (79.3)	41.1 (106.0)
Mean daily maximum °C (°F)	9.8 (49.6)	12.7 (54.9)	16.7 (62.1)	23.3 (73.9)	27.6 (81.7)	30.6 (87.1)	34.0 (93.2)	33.5 (92.3)	29.7 (85.5)	24.4 (75.9)	18.7 (65.7)	12.7 (54.9)	22.8 (73.1)
Daily mean °C (°F)	6.5 (43.7)	9.0 (48.2)	12.8 (55.0)	18.8 (65.8)	23.2 (73.8)	26.6 (79.9)	29.3 (84.7)	28.6 (83.5)	25.0 (77.0)	19.8 (67.6)	14.2 (57.6)	8.7 (47.7)	18.5 (65.4)
Mean daily minimum °C (°F)	4.2 (39.6)	6.3 (43.3)	10.0 (50.0)	15.5 (59.9)	19.8 (67.6)	23.5 (74.3)	25.7 (78.3)	25.1 (77.2)	21.5 (70.7)	16.4 (61.5)	10.9 (51.6)	5.8 (42.4)	15.4 (59.7)
Record low °C (°F)	−7.0 (19.4)	−5.4 (22.3)	−0.8 (30.6)	3.6 (38.5)	9.3 (48.7)	14.1 (57.4)	18.6 (65.5)	18.7 (65.7)	13.0 (55.4)	3.7 (38.7)	−0.8 (30.6)	−6.5 (20.3)	−7.0 (19.4)
Average precipitation mm (inches)	73.7 (2.90)	84.4 (3.32)	146.1 (5.75)	145.5 (5.73)	180.2 (7.09)	184.5 (7.26)	104.3 (4.11)	124.8 (4.91)	57.3 (2.26)	67.5 (2.66)	76.6 (3.02)	52.8 (2.08)	1,297.7 (51.09)
Average precipitation days (≥ 0.1 mm)	14.9	14.8	19.2	16.9	16.3	15.1	10.3	11.4	9.1	9.1	11.1	10.5	158.7
Average snowy days	2.8	1.6	0.6	0	0	0	0	0	0	0	0	0.7	5.7
Average relative humidity (%)	80	80	83	81	81	82	74	75	77	76	78	76	79
Mean monthly sunshine hours	49.5	52.0	62.8	97.5	124.4	130.2	226.7	193.2	140.8	117.9	105.5	85.6	1,386.1
Percentage possible sunshine	15	16	17	25	30	32	54	48	39	33	33	26	31
Source 1: China Meteorological Administrationall-time May record high
Source 2: Weather China

== Administrative divisions ==
As of October 2022, there are 11 county-level divisions under jurisdiction of Yongzhou:

- Lengshuitan District (冷水滩区)
- Lingling District (零陵区)
- Qiyang City (祁阳市)
- Dong'an County (东安县)
- Dao County (道县)
- Ningyuan County (宁远县)
- Jiangyong County (江永县)
- Lanshan County (蓝山县)
- Xintian County (新田县)
- Shuangpai County (双牌县)
- Jianghua Yao Autonomous County (江华瑶族自治县)

Map
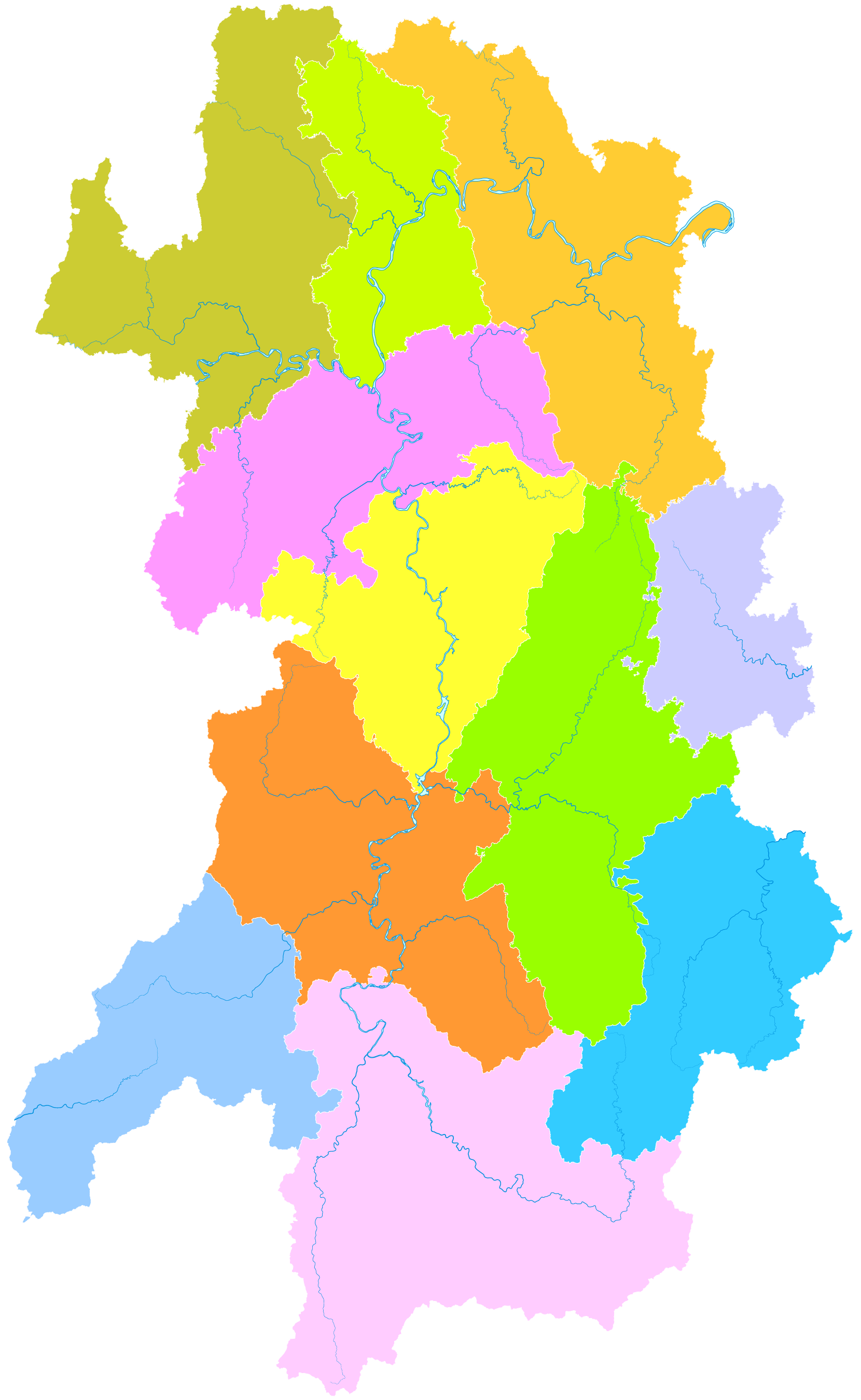

== Government ==
The current Secretary of the Municipal Party Committee of Yongzhou is Zhu Hongwu and the current mayor is Chen Ailin.

== Transportation ==
=== Air ===
- Yongzhou Lingling Airport (永州机场), Located in Lanjiaoshan Town, Yongzhou City, the airport is 7 kilometers away from the northernmost end of Lingling City and the southernmost end of Lengshuitan City.

=== Rail ===
- Yongzhou Railway Station (永州站)
- Lingling Railway Station (零陵火车站)
- Yongzhou East Railway Station (永州东站)

==== Within Yongzhou area; ====
- Hunan–Guangxi Railway (湘桂铁路)
- Luo-Zhan Railway (洛湛铁路)

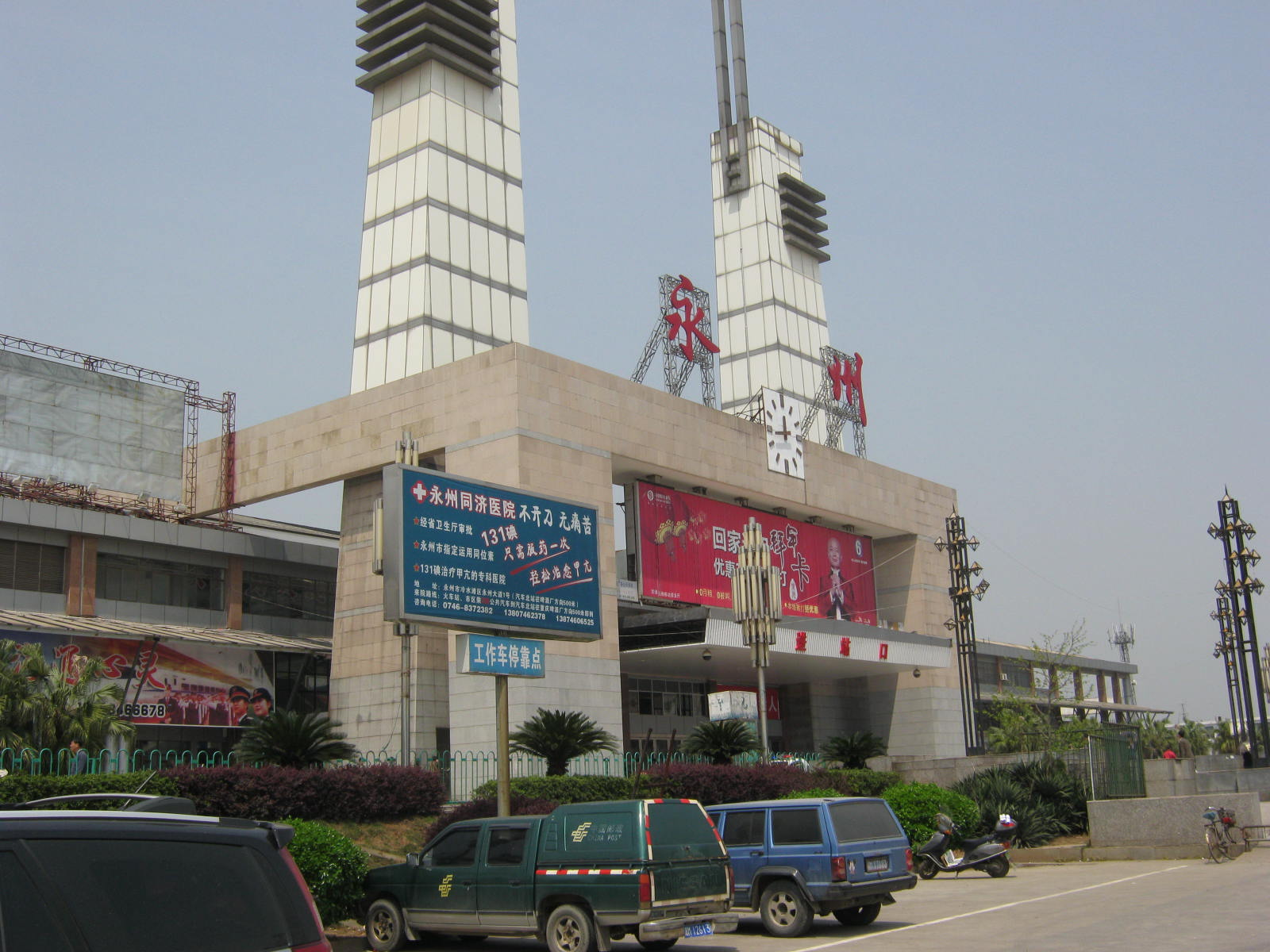
Yongzhou railway station (永州站)

=== Highway ===
- China National Highway 207
- China National Highway 322

== Demographics ==
According to the 7th National Population Census conducted in 2020, the permanent resident population of the city is 5,289,824. Compared to the 5,194,275 people in the sixth national population census, there has been a total increase of 95549 people in the past decade, an increase of 1.84%, and an average annual growth rate of 0.18%.

=== Ethnic composition ===
Yongzhou City is a multi-ethnic area. There are 49 ethnic groups in the city, including 48 ethnic minorities. The permanent population of ethnic minorities is 561,342, accounting for 10.61%; the registered population of ethnic minorities is 740,639, accounting for 11.57%, both ranking fourth in the Hunan province.

== Education ==
=== Secondary school ===
- Hunan Yongzhou No.1 High School (湖南省永州市第一中学)

=== Universities and Colleges ===
- Hunan University of Science and Engineering (湖南科技学院)

== Notable people ==
- Liu Wen - China's first supermodel
- Qu Dongyu - Ninth Director-General of the Food and Agriculture Organization (FAO) of the United Nations
- Lei Yingchuan - soldier
- Li Da - Chinese Marxist philosopher and President of Wuhan University (1952-1966)
- Huaisu - Buddhist monk and calligrapher of the Tang dynasty
- Huang Gai - military general during the late Eastern Han dynasty of China
- Tang Baiqiao - Political dissident
- Qin Guangrong - Former politician
- Chen Sanxin - Former politician
- Yi Yi - Actress and host

== Sister cities ==
Country	City	State / Region	Since
Sri Lanka	Nuwara Eliya	Central Province	2009
Malaysia	Klang	Selangor	

== Courthouse incident ==
Three judges were killed and three court staff were injured by submachine gun in the 2010 Yongzhou courthouse shooting. The assailant was apparently angry at the Chinese justice system about the results of his divorce settlement.
