= Xinhua Township, Fuchuan County =

Xinhua Township 新华乡
- Township
- Location in Guangxi
- Coordinates: 24°50′46″N 111°24′49″E
- Country: China
- Autonomous Region: Guangxi
- Prefecture-level city: Hezhou
- Autonomous county: Fuchuan Yao Autonomous County

Area
  - Total: 103.6 km^{2} (40.0 sq mi)

Population (2018)
  - Total: 18,500
  - Density: 179/km^{2} (462/sq mi)
- Time zone: UTC+08:00 (China Standard)
- Postal code: 542707
- Area code: 0774

Xinhua Township (simplified Chinese: 新华乡; traditional Chinese: 新華鄉; pinyin: Xīnhuá Xiāng; lit. 'New China Township') is a township in Fuchuan Yao Autonomous County, Guangxi, China. As of the 2018 census it had a population of 18,500 and an area of 103.6 square kilometres (40.0 sq mi).

== Etymology ==
The name of "Xinhua" means "New China".

== Administrative division ==
As of 2016, the township is divided into one community and ten villages:

- Xinhua Community (新华社区)
- Dongwan (东湾村)
- Xinhua (新华村)
- Jingwan (井湾村)
- Panba (盘坝村)
- Lianshantang (莲山塘村)
- Pingyuan (坪源村)
- Luping (路坪村)
- Xianfeng (先锋村)
- Luxi (路溪村)
- Longji (龙集村)

== History ==
It was incorporated as a township in 1984.

== Geography ==
The township is located in eastern Fuchuan Yao Autonomous County. It borders Fuli Town in the north, Jianghua Yao Autonomous County in the east, Baisha Town in the south, and Fuyang Town in the west.

== Economy ==
The township's economy is based on agriculture. Significant crops include grains, corn, peanut, sweet potato, and pepper. Commercial crops include tobacco and vegetables.

== Transportation ==
The County Road X723 passes across the town.
