= Pinggui District =

Pinggui 平桂区 · Bingzgvei Gih
- District
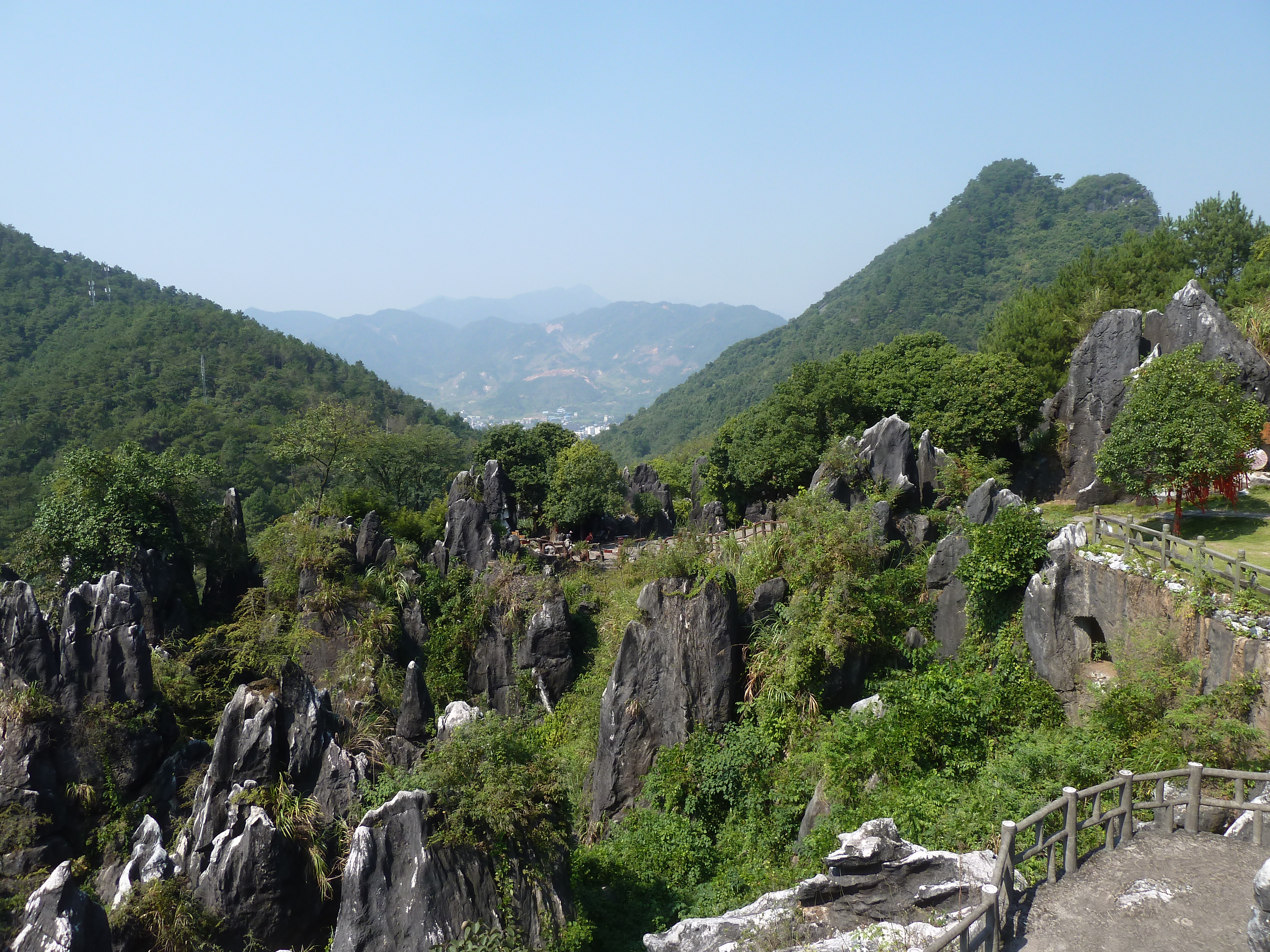

- Location in Guangxi
- Coordinates (Xiwan Subdistrict): 24°27′52″N 111°29′33″E
- Country: China
- Autonomous Region: Guangxi
- Prefecture-level city: Hezhou
- District seat: Xiwan Subdistrict

Area
  - Total: 2,022 km^{2} (781 sq mi)

Population (2016)
  - Total: 415,000
  - Density: 205/km^{2} (532/sq mi)
- Time zone: UTC+8 (China Standard)
- Postal code: 542xxx
- ISO 3166-2: CN-45-11-03
- Website: http://www.pinggui.gov.cn

Pinggui District (Chinese: 平桂区; pinyin: Píngguì qū; Zhuang: Bingzgvei Gih) is one of two urban districts of the city of Hezhou, Guangxi Zhuang Autonomous Region, China. The district lies in the western part of the city proper of Hezhou, it was formed from one subdistrict, one township and 7 towns of Babu District on 8 June 2016. Pinggui District is bordered by Zhongshan and Zhaoping Counties to the west, Cangwu County to the south, Babu District to the east, and Jianghua County of Hunan Province and Fuchuan County to the north. It covers 2,022 km^{2} (781 sq mi) with a population of 415,000 (as of 2016). Its seat is Xiwan Subdistrict.

== Administrative divisions ==
Pinggui District is divided into 1 subdistrict, 7 towns and 1 ethnic township:

subdistrict

- Xiwan 西湾街道

towns

- Huangtian 黄田镇
- Etang 鹅塘镇
- Shatian 沙田镇
- Gonghui 公会镇
- Shuikou 水口镇
- Wanggao 望高镇
- Yangtou 羊头镇

ethnic township

- Daping Yao Ethnic Township 大平瑶族乡
