= Liujia Township, Fuchuan County =

Liujia Township 柳家乡
- Township
- Location in Guangxi
- Coordinates: 24°44′04″N 111°14′31″E
- Country: China
- Autonomous Region: Guangxi
- Prefecture-level city: Hezhou
- Autonomous county: Fuchuan Yao Autonomous County

Area
  - Total: 109 km^{2} (42 sq mi)

Population (2018)
  - Total: 17,000
  - Density: 160/km^{2} (400/sq mi)
- Time zone: UTC+08:00 (China Standard)
- Postal code: 542713
- Area code: 0774

Liujia Township (simplified Chinese: 柳家乡; traditional Chinese: 柳家鄉; pinyin: Liǔjiā Xiāng) is a township in Fuchuan Yao Autonomous County, Guangxi, China. As of the 2018 census, it had a population of 17,000 and an area of 109 square kilometres (42 sq mi).

== Administrative division ==
As of 2016, the township is divided into one community and nine villages:

- Liujia Community (柳家社区)
- Fengling (凤岭村)
- Changxijiang (长溪江村)
- Xinshi (新石村)
- Xiawan (下湾村)
- Shiba (石坝村)
- Longyan (龙岩村)
- Dongjing (洞井村)
- Yangxin (洋新村)
- Dawan (大湾村)

== Geography ==
The township is situated in southwestern Fuchuan Yao Autonomous County. It is surrounded by Fuyang Town to the north, Gongcheng Yao Autonomous County to the west, Guishi Reservoir to the east, and Zhongshan County to the south.

The Guishi Reservoir (龟石水库) is a reservoir located in the township.

== Economy ==
The local economy is primarily based on agriculture and forestry. crops include grains, vegetables, medicinal materials, and Cassava. The region abounds with iron and rare-earth minerals.

== Transportation ==
The township is connected to two highways: China National Highway G538 and Provincial Highway S203.
