= Fuli, Fuchuan County =

Fuli 福利镇
- Town
- Location in Guangxi
- Coordinates: 24°51′58.25″N 111°14′52.55″E
- Country: People's Republic of China
- Autonomous Region: Guangxi
- Prefecture-level city: Hezhou
- Autonomous county: Fuchuan Yao Autonomous County

Area
  - Total: 90 km^{2} (35 sq mi)

Population (2018)
  - Total: 21,000
  - Density: 230/km^{2} (600/sq mi)
- Time zone: UTC+08:00 (China Standard)
- Postal code: 542706
- Area code: 0774

Fuli (simplified Chinese: 福利镇; traditional Chinese: 福利鎮; pinyin: Fúlì Zhèn) is a town located in Fuchuan Yao Autonomous County of Guangxi Zhuang Autonomous Region, China. Centering on the Immortal Lake Ecological Park, the town is around 90 square kilometres (35 sq mi) in size and has jurisdiction over 12 village committees, 31 natural villages and 8680 households with a population of 49,318. Cittaslow, an Italian organization, has recently certified Fuli town as the first "international slow city" in Guangxi and the fourth in China. Before that, Fuchuan had been vigorously promoting tourism by developing rural home inns and eco-villages and making the best of unique local resources.

== History ==
Fuli town is inhabited by Yao and Han nationalities and has been part of Fuchuan since the 4th year of the Kaibao period in the Song Dynasty. Its main industry revolves around agriculture, predominantly rice, organic vegetables, and citrus, and is the core agricultural demonstration zone in Guangxi.

== Cittaslow (slow city movement) ==
In July 2015, Cittaslow sent a delegation to Fuchuan to do field inspection and evaluation. The Agriculture Core Demonstration Plot in Fuli town was considered to meet the standard of an "international slow city". On November 2, Fuchuan County, successfully passed the "international slow city" criteria, specifically with regard to:

- The creation of a Sea of Flowers, the first-stage completed and open to public on October 1, 2015, with an area of 550 mu.
- The Maocaowu leisure and vacation farm of Shenxian lake has been completed.
- All villages are greened, beautified and brightened according to the mode of "micro countryside".
- Old buildings and dwellings have undergone renovations based on the idea of "restoring the old as the old".
- Signboards and guide maps in every scenic spot, crossroad and key areas are further perfected.
- The building of 10 km of asphalt road in the main stems, 10 km of bikeway, another 10 km of footpath around the lake, sightseeing stacks, viewing decks, information corridors and public toilets.

Cittaslow has also reached cooperation agreements with many domestic enterprises in Fuli, for the promotion of ecological leisure, health preserving, and vacation tourism.

Chen Hua, secretary of Fuchuan County Party committee, said that Fuchuan now has invested more than 6 million yuan ($0.91 million) in an inn and a mountainous resort with a total planned investment of over 12 million yuan. It has also used the 100 mu (6.67 hectares) land planned for tourism and has built a large-scale green parking lot.

In addition to Shenxian Lake Agricultural Sightseeing Park, there is a 2,100 mu Rose Lake Water Park, a 200 mu health maintenance park, and a 300 mu rare fruits picking garden. At present, the area has received nearly 300,000 tourists, earning income of 123 million yuan.

The other three Cittaslow cities in China are: Nanjing, Gaochun's Sam town, Guangdong's Meizhou town, Shandong's Qufu town, Shimen's Yan Yang town.

== Administrative division ==
As of 2016, the town is divided into one community and ten villages:

- Xiangcaoping Community (香草坪社区)
- Fuli (福利村)
- Luofeng (罗丰村)
- Huaping (花坪村)
- Maojia (毛家村)
- Hongyan (红岩村)
- Futian (浮田村)
- Wuxi (务溪村)
- Dongchi (洞池村)
- Baizhu (白竹村)
- Shuitoutun (水头屯村)

== Geography ==
The town is located in northeastern Fuchuan Yao Autonomous County. It is surrounded by Gepo Town and Shijia County on the north, Fuyang Town on the west, Jianghua Yao Autonomous County on the east, and Gucheng on the south.

== Economy ==
The region's economy is based on agriculture. Agricultural crops include grains, vegetables, fruits, Camellia oleifera, jujube, navel orange (脐橙), and Citrus tangerina (柑). Tobacco is one of the important economic crops in the region.

== Tourist attractions ==
The Immortal Lake Ecological Park (神仙湖生态园) is a popular attraction.

== Transportation ==
The Luoyang–Zhanjiang railway passes across the town.
