= Lianshan, Fuchuan County =

Lianshan Town 莲山镇
- Town
- Location in Guangxi
- Coordinates: 24°45′41″N 111°20′49″E
- Country: People's Republic of China
- Autonomous Region: Guangxi
- Prefecture-level city: Hezhou
- Autonomous county: Fuchuan Yao Autonomous County

Area
  - Total: 107.5 km^{2} (41.5 sq mi)

Population (2018)
  - Total: 27,000
  - Density: 250/km^{2} (650/sq mi)
- Time zone: UTC+08:00 (China Standard)
- Postal code: 542709
- Area code: 0774

Lianshan (simplified Chinese: 莲山镇; traditional Chinese: 蓮山鎮; pinyin: Liánshān Zhèn) is a town in Fuchuan Yao Autonomous County, Guangxi, China. As of the 2018 census it had a population of 27,000 and an area of 107.5 square kilometres (41.5 sq mi).

== Administrative division ==
As of 2016, the town is divided into one community and eleven villages:

- Lianshanjie Community (莲山街社区)
- Jishan (吉山村)
- Shazhou (沙洲村)
- Jinfeng (金峰村)
- Luoshan (罗山村)
- Liantang (莲塘村)
- Dongkou (洞口村)
- Xiabashan (下坝山村)
- Yangshi (洋狮村)
- Mixi (米溪村)
- Ludong (鲁洞村)
- Jingzhou (荆早村)

== Geography ==
The town is situated at southeastern Fuchuan Yao Autonomous County. It is surrounded by Gucheng Town on the north, Guigu Reservoir (龟古水库) on the west, Jianghua Yao Autonomous County and Xinhua Township on the east, and Baisha Town on the south.

The Shijia Stream (石家河) flow through the town northeast to southwest.

== Economy ==
The town's economy is based on nearby mineral resources and agricultural resources. Agricultural crops include grains, fruits, and vegetables. Navel orange (脐橙) and pear are the economic plants of this region. The region abounds with iron and rare-earth mineral.

== Tourist attractions ==
Guishi National Wetland Park (龟石国家湿地公园) is a famous scenic spot.

== Transportation ==
The China National Highway G538 passes through the town.
