= Mailing, Fuchuan County =

Mailing 麦岭镇
- Town
- Location in Guangxi
- Coordinates: 25°03′45″N 111°19′20″E
- Country: People's Republic of China
- Autonomous Region: Guangxi
- Prefecture-level city: Hezhou
- Autonomous county: Fuchuan Yao Autonomous County

Area
  - Total: 207 km^{2} (80 sq mi)

Population (2018)
  - Total: 26,000
  - Density: 130/km^{2} (330/sq mi)
- Time zone: UTC+08:00 (China Standard)
- Postal code: 542704
- Area code: 0774

Mailing (simplified Chinese: 麦岭镇; traditional Chinese: 麥嶺鎮; pinyin: Màilǐng Zhèn) is a town in Fuchuan Yao Autonomous County, Guangxi, China. As of the 2018 census it had a population of 26,000 and an area of 207 square kilometres (80 sq mi).

== Administrative division ==
As of 2016, the town is divided into one community and thirteen villages:

- Mailing Community (麦岭社区)
- Mailing (麦岭村)
- Changchun (长春村)
- Daba (大坝村)
- Xinzao (新造村)
- Xiaotian (小田村)
- Xiulin (秀林村)
- Gaoqiao (高桥村)
- Yongquan (涌泉村)
- Yuetang (月塘村)
- Cunhuang (村黄村)
- Jintian (金田村)
- Hemu (和睦村)
- Sanmin (三民村)

== History ==
In 1996 it was upgraded to a town.

== Geography ==
The town is situated at the northeastern Fuchuan Yao Autonomous County. It is bordered to the north by Jiangyong County, to the east by Shijia Township, to the south by Gepo Town, and to the west by Chaodong Town.

The Changchun Reservoir (长春水库) is a reservoir located in the town, which provides drinking water and water for irrigation.

The Mailing Stream (麦岭河), Jintian Stream (金田河), Fujiang River (富江河) and Gongtang Stream (巩塘河) flow through the town.

== Economy ==
The main industries in and around the town are forestry and farming. Commercial crops include tobacco, peanut and Camellia oleifera.

== Transportation ==
The town is connected to two highways: the China National Highway G538 and the S13 Zhongshan County–Fuchuan County Expressway.
