= Gepo =

Gepo 葛坡镇
- Town
- Location in Guangxi
- Coordinates: 24°56′58″N 111°16′40″E
- Country: People's Republic of China
- Autonomous Region: Guangxi
- Prefecture-level city: Hezhou
- Autonomous county: Fuchuan Yao Autonomous County

Area
  - Total: 93.56 km^{2} (36.12 sq mi)

Population (2018)
  - Total: 17,810
  - Density: 190.4/km^{2} (493.0/sq mi)
- Time zone: UTC+08:00 (China Standard)
- Postal code: 542700
- Area code: 0774

Gepo (simplified Chinese: 葛坡镇; traditional Chinese: 葛坡鎮; pinyin: Gěpō Zhèn) is a town in Fuchuan Yao Autonomous County, Guangxi, China. As of the 2018 census it had a population of 17,810 and an area of 93.56 square kilometres (36.12 sq mi).

== Administrative division ==
As of 2016, the town is divided into one community and twelve villages:

- Gepojie Community (葛坡街社区)
- Lingui (林桂村)
- Zhaixiang (宅祥村)
- Jile (极乐村)
- Shantang (山塘村)
- Banzhu (斑竹村)
- Qishan (岐山村)
- Shenpo (深坡村)
- Maping (马坪村)
- Shangdong (上洞村)
- Hedong (合洞村)
- Macao (马槽村)
- Lou (楼村)

== History ==
In 1984 it separated from Mailing Township (now Mailing). In 1996 it was upgraded to a town.

== Geography ==
The town lies at the northern of Fuchuan Yao Autonomous County, bordering Chengbei Town to the west, Fuyang Town and Fuli Town to the south, Mailing Town to the north, and Shijia Township to the east.

The Fuchuan River flows through the town north to south.

== Economy ==
The principal industries in the area are agriculture, forestry and mineral resources. Agricultural crops include grains, vegetables, fruits, tobacco, navel orange (脐橙), pear, and Ziziphus mauritiana. The region also has an abundance of iron, tin, copper, manganese and granite.

== Transportation ==
The town is connected to two highways: the China National Highway G538 and the S13 Zhongshan County–Fuchuan County Expressway.
