= Shijia Township, Fuchuan County =

Shijia Township 石家乡
- Township
- Location in Guangxi
- Country: People's Republic of China
- Autonomous Region: Guangxi
- Prefecture-level city: Hezhou
- Autonomous county: Fuchuan Yao Autonomous County

Area
  - Total: 91.13 km^{2} (35.19 sq mi)

Population (2018)
  - Total: 13,400
  - Density: 147/km^{2} (381/sq mi)
- Time zone: UTC+08:00 (China Standard)
- Postal code: 542708
- Area code: 0774

Shijia Township (simplified Chinese: 石家乡; traditional Chinese: 石家鄉; pinyin: Shíjiā Xiāng) is a township in Fuchuan Yao Autonomous County, Guangxi, China. As of the 2018 census it had a population of 13,400 and an area of 91.13 square kilometres (35.19 sq mi).

== Administrative division ==
As of 2016, the township is divided into one community and seven villages:

- Shijia Community (石家社区)
- Shijian (石枧村)
- Caoli (曹里村)
- Chengshang (城上村)
- Huangzhu (黄竹村)
- Pingzhu (坪珠村)
- Longwan (龙湾村)
- Zeyuan (泽源村)

== History ==
It was incorporated as a township in 1984.

== Geography ==
It lies at the northeastern of Fuchuan Yao Autonomous County, bordering Gepo Town to the west, Fuli Town to the south, Mailing Town and Jiangyong County to the north, and Jianghua Yao Autonomous County to the east.

The Shijia River flow the township north to south.

== Economy ==
Agriculture and forestry also play roles in the local economy. Economic crops are mainly Navel orange (脐橙), medicinal materials and tobacco. Breeding includes pig farming, goat farming, and poultry farming.
