= Zhongshan West railway station =

Railway station in Guangxi, China

Zhongshan West 钟山西站
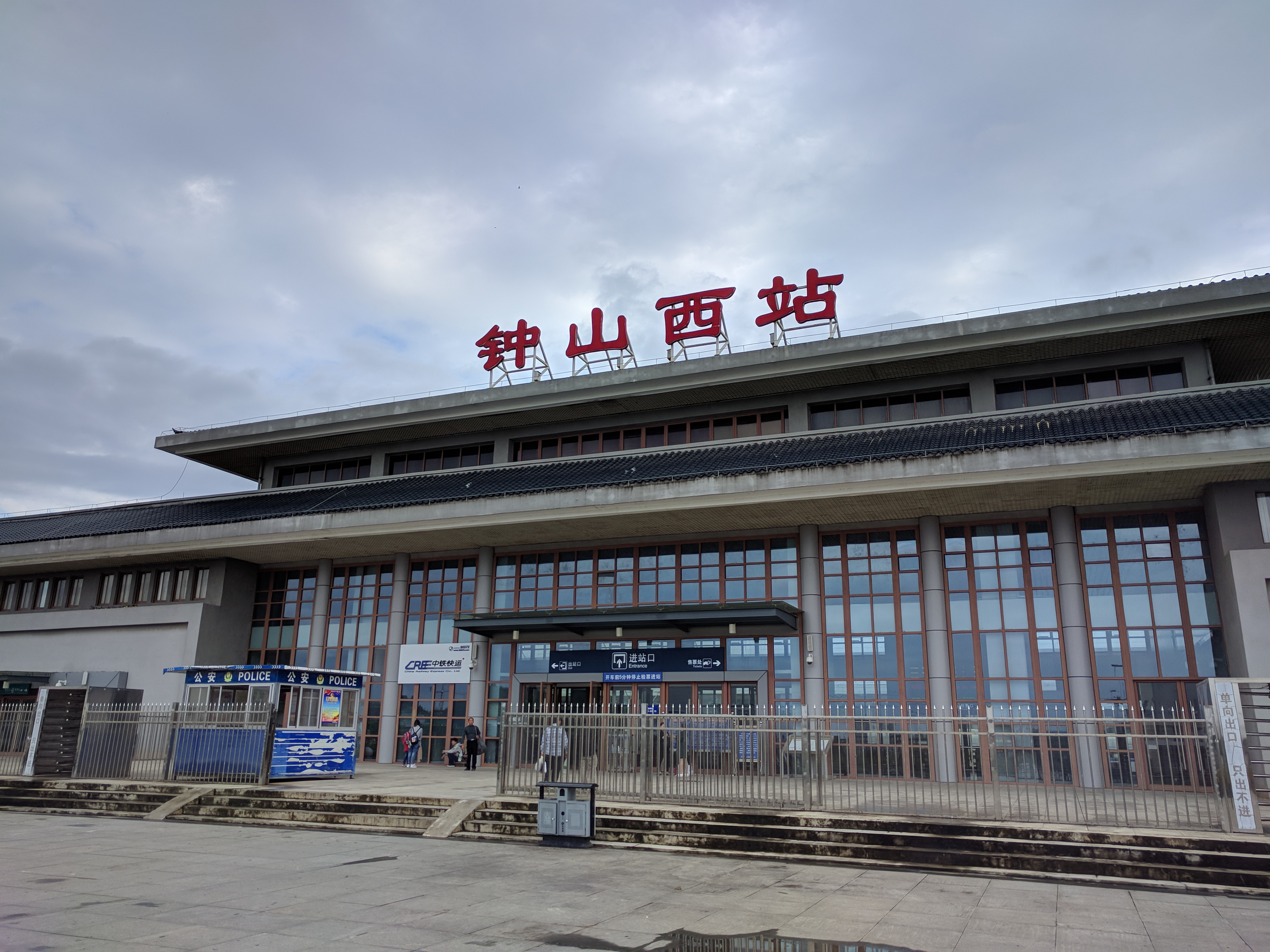

General information
- Location: Zhongshan County, Hezhou, Guangxi; China
- Coordinates: 24.555222°N 111.32675°E
- System: High speed rail
- Line: Guiyang–Guangzhou high-speed railway

History
- Opened: 3 April 2015
Location

Zhongshan West railway station is a railway station in Zhongshan County, Hezhou, Guangxi, China. It is an intermediate station on the Guiyang–Guangzhou high-speed railway and was opened on 3 April 2015.

Preceding station	China Railway High-speed	Following station
Gongcheng towards Guiyang North	Guiyang–Guangzhou high-speed railway	Hezhou towards Guangzhou South
