= Baisha, Fuchuan County =

Baisha 白沙镇
- Town
- Location in Guangxi
- Coordinates: 24°39′5″N 111°24′8″E
- Country: People's Republic of China
- Autonomous Region: Guangxi
- Prefecture-level city: Hezhou
- Autonomous county: Fuchuan Yao Autonomous County

Area
  - Total: 98.85 km^{2} (38.17 sq mi)

Population (2018)
  - Total: 15,000
  - Density: 150/km^{2} (390/sq mi)
- Time zone: UTC+08:00 (China Standard)
- Postal code: 542711
- Area code: 0774

Baisha (simplified Chinese: 白沙镇; traditional Chinese: 白沙鎮; pinyin: Báishā Zhèn) is a town of Fuchuan Yao Autonomous County, Guangxi, China. As of 2018, it has one residential community and 6 villages under its administration. As of the 2018 census it had a population of 15,000 and an area of 98.85 square kilometres (38.17 sq mi).

== Administrative division ==
As of 2016, the town is divided into one community and six villages:

- Baisha Community (白沙社区)
- Jingshan (井山村)
- Mujiang (木江村)
- Jiling (鸡岭村)
- Qingtian (檠田村)
- Chaqing (茶青村)
- Pingjiang (坪江村)

== Geography ==
It lies at the southeastern of Fuchuan Yao Autonomous County, bordering Zhongshan County to the south and southwest, Lianshan Town to the north and northwest, and Jianghua Yao Autonomous County to the east.

The Baisha River flows through the town north to south.

== Economy ==
The principal industries in the town are agriculture, forestry and mineral resources. Significant crops include grains, Castanea mollissima, Myrica rubra, and ginger. The region also has an abundance of tin.

== Transportation ==
The China National Highway 207 passes across the town north to south.
