= Lianshan =

Lianshan may refer to:

- Lianshan District (连山区), Huludao, Liaoning
- Lianshan Zhuang and Yao Autonomous County (连山壮族瑶族自治县), Qingyuan, Guangdong
- Lianshan, Fuchuan County (莲山镇), town in Fuchuan Yao Autonomous County, Guangxi
- Lianshan, Pulandian (莲山镇), town in Liaoning
- Lianshan, Huitong County (连山乡), a township of Huitong County, Hunan.
- Lianshan (連山), one of the three ancient Chinese divinatory texts, along with Guicang (歸藏) and Zhouyi (周易).
