= Fuchuan Yao Autonomous County =

Fuchuan County 富川县 Fuconh Yen Fuchwan
- Autonomous county
- 富川瑶族自治县; Fuconh Yauzcuz Swciyen; Fuchuan Yao Autonomous County
- Location of the seat in Guangxi
- Coordinates: 24°50′N 111°16′E
- Country: China
- Province: Guangxi
- Prefecture-level city: Hezhou
- Township-level divisions: 9 towns 3 townships
- County seat: Fuyang

Area
  - Total: 1,572 km^{2} (607 sq mi)
- Elevation: 228 m (748 ft)

Population (2020)
  - Total: 266,530
  - Density: 169.5/km^{2} (439.1/sq mi)
- Time zone: UTC+08:00 (China Standard)

Fuchuan Yao Autonomous County (simplified Chinese: 富川瑶族自治县; traditional Chinese: 富川瑤族自治縣; pinyin: Fùchuān Yáozú Zìzhìxiàn) is an autonomous county of northeastern Guangxi, China. It is under the administration of Hezhou City.

== Administrative divisions ==
As of January 2016, Fuchuan Yao Autonomous County has nine towns and three townships under its jurisdiction. The county seat is Fuyang Town.

Name	Chinese character	Population (2015)	Area (Km2)	Notes
Baisha	白沙镇	15,000	98.85	
Chengbei	城北镇	21,125	120	
Chaodong	朝东镇	33,850	217.42	
Fuli	福利镇	21,000	90	
Fuyang	富阳镇	76,000	205.2	
Gucheng	古城镇	20,600	42.65	
Gepo	葛坡镇	17,810	93.56	
Lianshan	莲山镇	27,000	107.5	
Mailing	麦岭镇	26,000	207	
Shijia Township	石家乡	13,400	91.13	
Liujia Township	柳家乡	17,000	109	
Xinhua Township	新华乡	18,500	103.6	

== Geography ==
Fuchuan Yao Autonomous County is located in the northeastern Guangxi, on the border with Hunan. It is surrounded by Jiangyong County on the north, Gongcheng Yao Autonomous County on the west, Jianghua Yao Autonomous County on the east, and Zhongshan County on the south. It has an area of approximately 1,572 square kilometres (607 sq mi).

Most of the county is in the upper basin of the Fuchuan River (富川江), a tributary of the He River (Guangxi) (贺江, Hejiang). The Fuchuan is dammed near the southern border of the county. The dam forms the Guishi Reservoir (龟石水库; Gushi Shuiku; 'Turtle Stone Reservoir'), which is used to irrigate agricultural land not only in Fuchuan County itself, but also in Zhongshan County and Babu District to the south.

=== Mountains ===
The main mountains in Fuchuan Yao Autonomous County are Mount Xiling, Mount Gupo, Mount Tiantang, and Huangsha Ridge.

=== Rivers and streams ===
There are over twenty rivers and streams in Fuchuan Yao Autonomous County. Among them, the main rivers are the Fuchuan River, Baisha River and Xiushui River (Guangxi).

=== Climate ===
Fuchuan Yao Autonomous County enjoys a subtropical monsoon climate, with an average annual temperature of 19.1 °C (66.4 °F), total annual rainfall of 1,700-millimetre (67 in), a frost-free period of 318 days and annual average sunshine hours in 1973.6 hours. The highest temperature ever recorded in the county was 38.5 °C (101.3 °F) on 21 July 1971, and the coldest was −4.1 °C (24.6 °F) on 31 January 1969.

Climate data for Fuchuan, elevation 193 m (633 ft), (1991–2020 normals)
Month	Jan	Feb	Mar	Apr	May	Jun	Jul	Aug	Sep	Oct	Nov	Dec	Year
Mean daily maximum °C (°F)	12.6 (54.7)	15.0 (59.0)	18.2 (64.8)	23.9 (75.0)	28.1 (82.6)	30.4 (86.7)	32.6 (90.7)	32.9 (91.2)	30.7 (87.3)	26.6 (79.9)	21.4 (70.5)	15.6 (60.1)	24.0 (75.2)
Daily mean °C (°F)	8.9 (48.0)	11.3 (52.3)	14.5 (58.1)	20.1 (68.2)	24.1 (75.4)	26.6 (79.9)	28.2 (82.8)	28.1 (82.6)	26.0 (78.8)	21.8 (71.2)	16.5 (61.7)	11.0 (51.8)	19.8 (67.6)
Mean daily minimum °C (°F)	6.3 (43.3)	8.6 (47.5)	11.9 (53.4)	17.0 (62.6)	21.0 (69.8)	23.9 (75.0)	25.0 (77.0)	24.7 (76.5)	22.5 (72.5)	18.2 (64.8)	12.9 (55.2)	7.7 (45.9)	16.6 (62.0)
Average precipitation mm (inches)	87.1 (3.43)	80.5 (3.17)	168.6 (6.64)	204.3 (8.04)	284.3 (11.19)	323.4 (12.73)	189.4 (7.46)	158.0 (6.22)	75.6 (2.98)	64.1 (2.52)	81.2 (3.20)	61.2 (2.41)	1,777.7 (69.99)
Average precipitation days (≥ 0.1 mm)	13.5	14.0	19.6	18.2	19.0	19.8	15.9	14.1	9.2	6.5	8.8	9.6	168.2
Average snowy days	1.1	0.4	0	0	0	0	0	0	0	0	0	0.2	1.7
Average relative humidity (%)	73	75	79	79	79	81	77	76	72	67	68	67	74
Mean monthly sunshine hours	65.0	53.2	51.7	75.7	108.8	122.9	195.4	190.4	158.3	148.0	123.1	110.5	1,403
Percentage possible sunshine	19	17	14	20	26	30	47	48	43	42	38	34	32
Source: China Meteorological Administration

== Languages ==
Languages of Fuchuan County include the following.

- Mien 勉话
- Chinese
  - Fuyang 富阳话
  - Minjia 民家话
  - Qidu 七都话
  - Badu 八都话
  - Jiudu 九都话
  - Wuzhou 梧州话
  - Hakka 客家话
  - Baoqing 保庆话

== Culture ==
The lusheng (mouth reed organ) is played by the Lowland Yao people (Pingdi Yao 平地瑶) of Dajing Village 大井村 and Humaling Village 虎马岭村 of Xinhua Township (新华乡), Fuchuan County.

== Transport ==
- Luoyang–Zhanjiang Railway
