= DYD =

DYD may refer to:

- Djugun dialect, the ISO 639-3 code DYD
- Duyun East railway station, the station code DYD
- Dydrogesterone, a progestin used in menopausal hormone therapy

== See also ==
- DYDD (disambiguation)
- Jean d'Yd (1880–1964), French actor and comedian
