= Guiyang–Guangzhou high-speed railway =

Railway line in China

Guiyang–Guangzhou high-speed railway 贵广高速铁路

Overview
- Status: Operational
- Locale: Guizhou, Guangxi and Guangdong; China
- Termini: Guiyang East; Guangzhou South

Service
- Services: 1
- Operator(s): CR Chengdu, CR Nanning, CR Guangzhou

History
- Opened: December 26, 2014

Technical
- Line length: 856 km (532 mi)
- Track gauge: 1,435 mm (4 ft 8 1/2 in)
- Operating speed: 250 km/h (155 mph)

Guiyang–Guangzhou high-speed railway, also known as the Guiguang HSR, is a high-speed railway line in southern China between Guiyang in Guizhou Province and Guangzhou in Guangdong Province. The railway is dedicated to high speed passenger rail service. The line is 856 km (532 mi) in length and can carry trains at speeds of up to 250 km/h (155 mph). The line was built from 2008 to 2014 and opened on December 26, 2014.

The line traverses rugged karst terrain in Guizhou and Guangxi and relies on extensive bridges and tunnels, which comprise 83% of the line's total length. The travel time by train between the two terminal cities was reduced from 20 hours to 4 hours.

== History ==
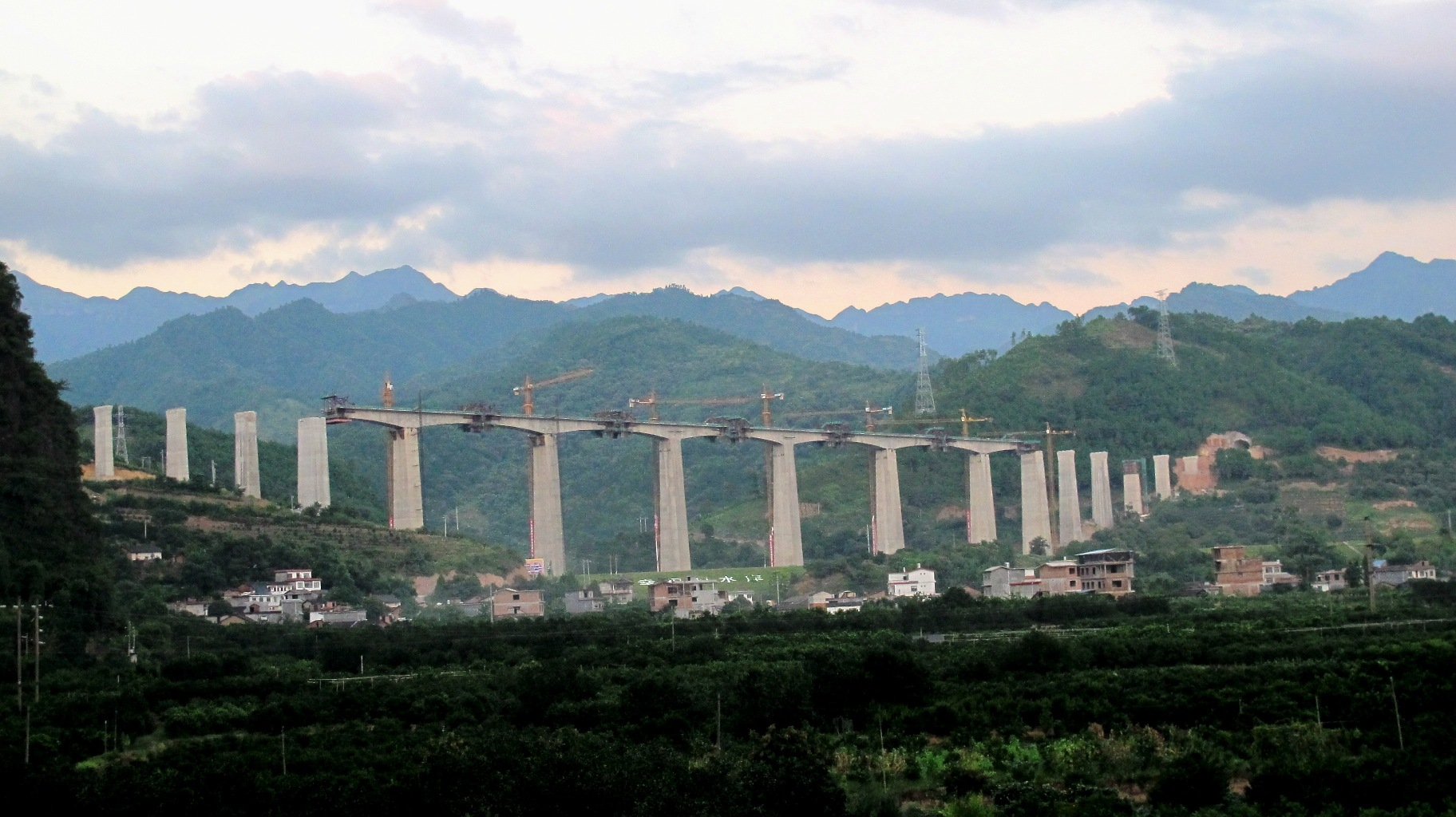
Construction progress on the Guiyang–Guangzhou high-speed railway, bridge over the Xingping Reservoir in Xingping district of Yangshuo county, Guilin, August 2013

The Guiguang HSR was a major trunk route planned in the 11th Five Year Plan by the Chinese government. It is designed to serve as a rapid rail link between the southwest China and the Pearl River Delta. Construction began in 2008 and was completed in 2014. The line was built to accommodate train speeds of up to 250 km/h (155 mph), with the capacity to be remodelled to allow train speeds of up to 300 km/h (186 mph).

== Route ==
Route of the Guiyang–Guangzhou high-speed railway

The Guiguang HSR takes a more direct route between its terminal cities, and crosses exceptionally difficult and mountainous terrain, which made construction very costly. The project cost an estimated 85.8 billion RMB (US$12.5 billion), although this figure was later revised to 94.6 billion RMB (US$13.8 billion).

The line runs from Guangzhou through Foshan, Sanshui and Zhaoqing in the densely populated Pearl River Delta and then crosses the Lingnan mountain range via Huaiji into Guangxi. It continues in a northwesterly direction through Hezhou and Zhongxiang to the famed scenic cities of Yangshuo and Guilin and then on to Sanjiang. The line enters Guizhou at Congjiang near the southeast tip of the province and passes Rongjiang, Sandu, Duyun, and Longli on to Guiyang in the center of the province.

This line traverses 270 tunnels and 510 valleys across the karst landscape. Bridges and tunnels account for 83% of the line's total length, including 92% in Guizhou. A total of 238 tunnels, totaling 464 km (288 mi), were built along route including nine tunnels over 10 km (6.2 mi) in length. The longest tunnel, through the Yan Mountain in Rongjiang, is 14.693 km (9.130 mi).

== Stations ==
Station Name	Chinese	Metro transfers/connections	Location
Guiyang North	贵阳北	1	Guizhou
Guiyang East	贵阳东		Guizhou
Longdongbao	龙洞堡	Guiyang Longdongbao International Airport; 2	Guizhou
Longli North	龙里北		Guizhou
Guidingxian	贵定县		Guizhou
Duyun East	都匀东		Guizhou
Sanduxian	三都县		Guizhou
Rongjiang	榕江		Guizhou
Congjiang	从江		Guizhou
Sanjiang South	三江南		Guangxi
Wutong (closed)	五通		Guangxi
Guilin West	桂林西		Guangxi
Yangshuo	阳朔		Guangxi
Gongcheng	恭城		Guangxi
Zhongshan West	钟山西		Guangxi
Hezhou	贺州		Guangxi
Huaiji	怀集		Guangdong
Guangning	广宁		Guangdong
Zhaoqing East	肇庆东		Guangdong
Sanshui South	三水南		Guangdong
Foshan West	佛山西		Guangdong
Guangzhou South	广州南	2 7 22; 2	Guangdong

== Accidents and incidents ==
4 June 2022 – around 10:30AM CST, train D2809 derailed at Rongjiang railway station following a collision with a landslide just after exiting the Yuezhai Tunnel entrance. This led to the death of the driver, who noticed an "abnormality" on the track and engaged the emergency brakes, minimizing the disaster. Upon derailing, the train slid by more than 900 meters. The front car of the train swept out to the opposing track and finally stopped wedged on to the platform of Rongjiang railway station. One crew member and seven passengers sustained injuries. Train G2929 passed through the tunnel normally and entered Rongjiang railway station 15 minutes earlier, which meant the landslide happened quite suddenly. Repair work of the line was completed and resumed normal operation the next day.
