= Hezhou railway station =

Railway station in Guangxi, China

Hezhou 贺州
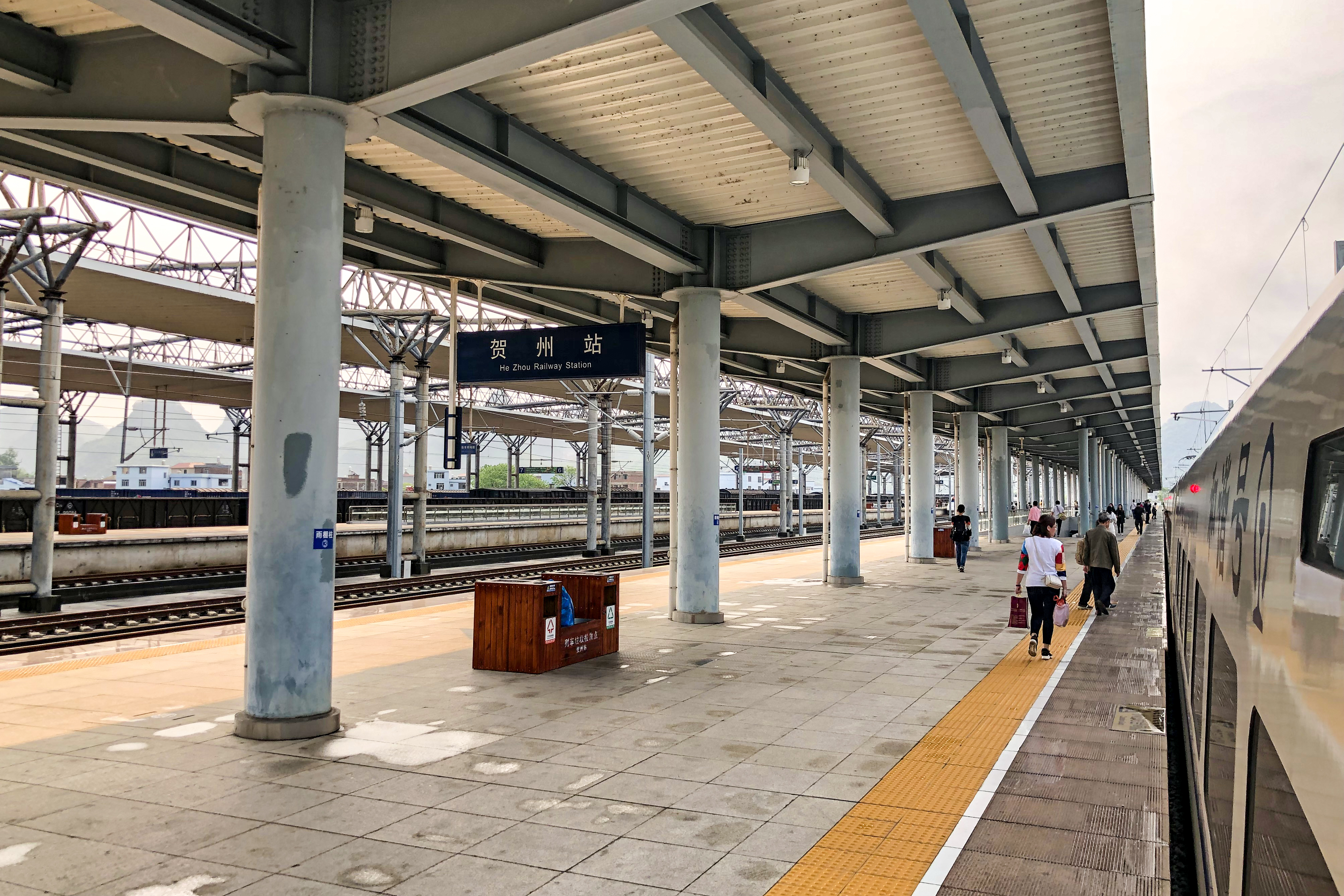

General information
- Location: Pinggui District, Hezhou, Guangxi; China
- Coordinates: 24.4571°N 111.5341°E
- Lines: Guiyang–Guangzhou high-speed railway Luoyang–Zhanjiang railway

History
- Opened: 28 September 2009
Location

Hezhou railway station is a railway station in Pinggui District, Hezhou, Guangxi, China. The Guiyang-Guangzhou high-speed railway and the conventional-speed Luoyang–Zhanjiang railway serve this station.

== History ==
The station opened to freight on 15 May 2009 and to passengers on 28 September.

The Guiyang-Guangzhou high-speed platforms were constructed adjacent to the existing station. High-speed service began in 2014.

In August 2017, reconstruction of the station building began. The new building was opened on 5 December 2018.

Preceding station	China Railway High-speed	Following station
Zhongshan West towards Guiyang North	Guiyang–Guangzhou high-speed railway	Huaiji towards Guangzhou South
