= Chaodong =

Chaodong 朝东镇
- Town
- Location in Guangxi
- Coordinates: 25°01′06″N 111°10′06″E
- Country: People's Republic of China
- Autonomous Region: Guangxi
- Prefecture-level city: Hezhou
- Autonomous county: Fuchuan Yao Autonomous County

Area
  - Total: 217.42 km^{2} (83.95 sq mi)

Population (2017)
  - Total: 33,850
  - Density: 155.7/km^{2} (403.2/sq mi)
- Time zone: UTC+08:00 (China Standard)
- Postal code: 542702
- Area code: 0774

Chaodong (simplified Chinese: 朝东镇; traditional Chinese: 朝東鎮; pinyin: Cháodōng Zhèn) is a town in Fuchuan Yao Autonomous County, Guangxi, China. As of the 2017 census it had a population of 33,850 and an area of 217.42 square kilometres (83.95 sq mi).

== Administrative division ==
As of 2016, the town is divided into one community and twenty-one villages:

- Chaodong Community (朝东社区)
- Chaodong (朝东村)
- Dongshui (东水村)
- Huangbao (黄宝村)
- Xiushui (秀水村)
- Heping (和平村)
- Chashan (岔山村)
- Minzhu (民主村)
- Tangyuan (塘源村)
- Bengbei (蚌贝村)
- Yingshang (营上村)
- Ruzi (儒子村)
- Tongshi (桐石村)
- Longgui (龙归村)
- Shilin (石林村)
- Gaozhai (高宅村)
- Youmu (油沐村)
- Chashan (茶山村)
- Huangsha (黄沙村)
- Changtang (长塘村)
- Liyutang (鲤鱼塘村)
- Fuxi (福溪村)

== Geography ==
The town is situated at northwestern Fuchuan Yao Autonomous County, bordering Jiangyong County to the northwest, Gongcheng Yao Autonomous County to the southwest, and Chengbei to the northeast.

The Xiushui River (秀峰河) flows through the town northeast to northwest.

== Economy ==
The economy is supported primarily by farming and ranching. The region mainly produce tobacco, vegetables, grapes, Castanea mollissima and medicinal materials. Other products include sweet potato, pumpkin, and taro.

== Tourist attractions ==
The town enjoys rich tourist resources. The most popular natural scenic spots are the Site of Jiangdong Academy (江东书院遗址), Site of Pangu Temple (盘古庙遗址), cliff inscriptions (摩崖石刻), and Huilan Wind-rain Bridge (回澜风雨桥). Ma Yin Temple (马殷庙) is a National Historical and Cultural Site in Guangxi.

== Transportation ==
The County Road X717 passes through the town.
