= Duyun railway station =

Railway station in Guizhou

Duyun 都匀
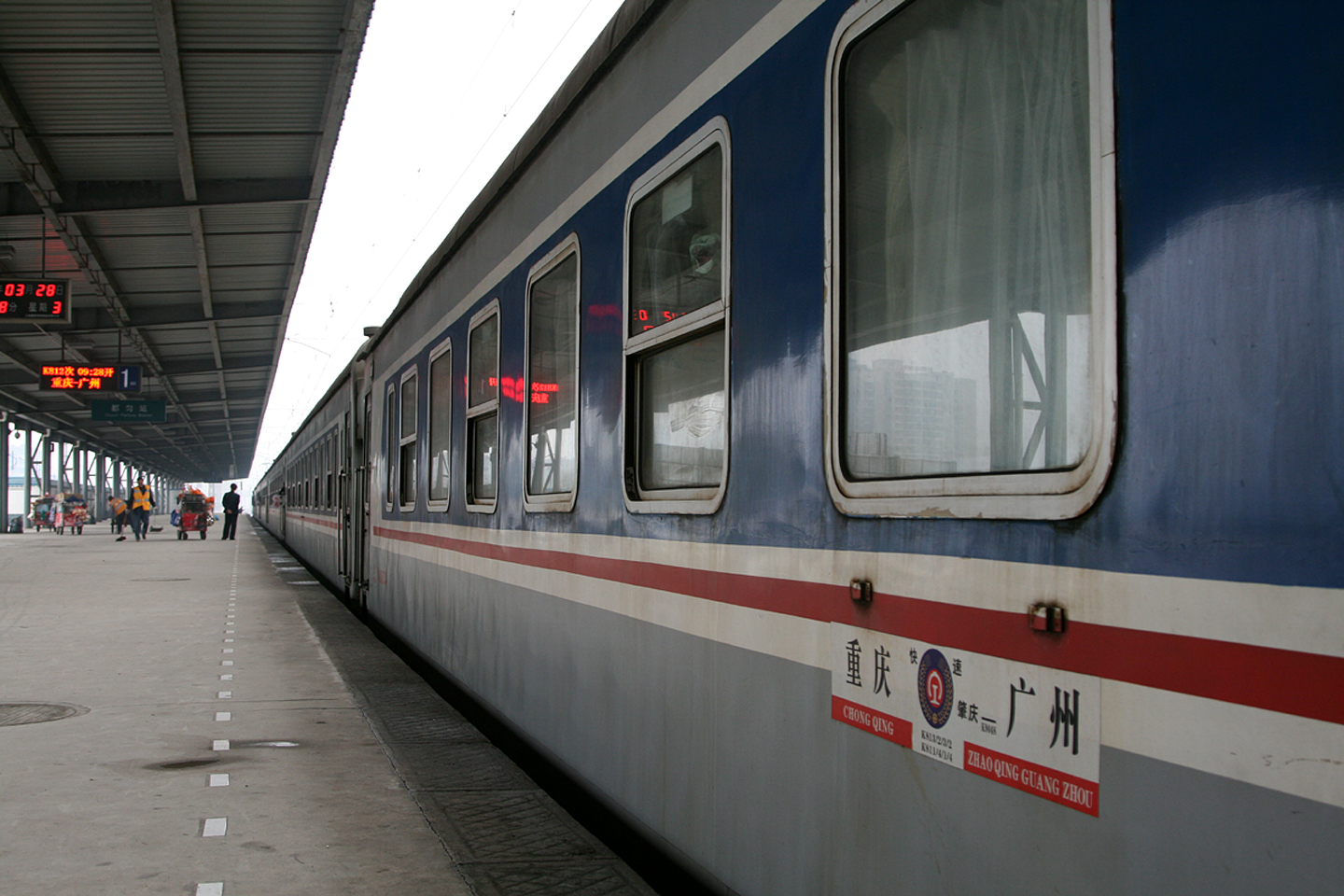

General information
- Location: Duyun, Qiannan Buyei and Miao Autonomous Prefecture, Guizhou; China
- Coordinates: 26°14′08″N 107°30′40″E
- Operated by: China Railway Chengdu Group
- Line: Guizhou–Guangxi railway

Other information
- Station code: RYW (China Railway Telegraph Code); DYU (China Railway Pinyin Code)
Location

Duyun railway station (Chinese: 都匀站; pinyin: Dūyún zhàn) is a railway station in Duyun, Qiannan Buyei and Miao Autonomous Prefecture, Guizhou, China. It is an intermediate stop on the Guizhou–Guangxi railway. The station is operated by China Railway Chengdu Group.

The station was built in the 1940s. Work on rebuilding the station as part of an upgrade project to the line began in October 2005. The relocated station was opened on 1 January 2009. The former station buildings were demolished in 2013.

== See also ==
- Duyun East railway station

Preceding station	China Railway	Following station
Guiding South towards Guiyang	Guizhou–Guangxi railway	Jiamao towards Liuzhou
