= Tuojiang, Jianghua =

Town in Hunan, China

Coordinates: 25°11′17″N 111°33′43″E

Tuojiang 沱江镇
- Town
- Interactive map of Tuojiang
- Country: China
- Province: Hunan
- Autonomous county: Jianghua
- Subdivisions: 42: 4 residential communities 38 administrative villages

Tuojiang Town (Chinese: 沱江镇; pinyin: Tuójiāng Zhèn) is a town and the county seat in the northwest of Jianghua Yao Autonomous County, Hunan, China. The town was reformed through the amalgamation of Qiaotoupu Town (Chinese: 桥头铺镇), the former Tuojiang Town and Dongshuiyuan Village (Chinese: 东水源村) entrusted by state-owned Jianghua Forest Farm on November 19, 2015. It has an area of 293.64 km^{2} (113.38 sq mi) with a population of 121,400 (as of 2015 end). Its seat is at Shujiashan (Chinese: 舒家山) of Baijiawei Village (Chinese: 百家尾村).
