= DYDD (disambiguation) =

DYDD is an AM radio station in Cebu City, Philippines. It may also refer to the following:

- Dydd Gŵyl Dewi Sant, known in English as Saint David's Day
- Dydd Miwsig Cymru, known in English as Welsh Language Music Day
- Dydd Santes Dwynwen, St. Dwynwen's Day in Wales
- Y Dydd, weekly liberal Welsh language newspaper

== See also ==
- DYD (disambiguation)
