= Chengbei, Fuchuan County =

Chengbei Town 城北镇
- Town
- Location in Guangxi
- Coordinates: 24°56′20″N 111°14′40″E
- Country: People's Republic of China
- Autonomous Region: Guangxi
- Prefecture-level city: Hezhou
- Autonomous county: Fuchuan Yao Autonomous County

Area
  - Total: 120 km^{2} (46 sq mi)

Population (2018)
  - Total: 21,125
  - Density: 180/km^{2} (460/sq mi)
- Time zone: UTC+08:00 (China Standard)
- Postal code: 542701
- Area code: 0774

Chengbei (simplified Chinese: 城北镇; traditional Chinese: 城北鎮; pinyin: Chéngběi Zhèn) is a town in Fuchuan Yao Autonomous County, Guangxi, China. As of the 2018 census it had a population of 21,125 and an area of 120 square kilometres (46 sq mi).

== Administrative division ==
As of 2016, the town is divided into eleven villages and one community:

- Chengbei Community (城北社区)
- Chengbei (城北村)
- Liuhe (六合村)
- Mashan (马山村)
- Shishi (石狮村)
- Liayuan (俩源村)
- Siyuan (泗源村)
- Weifeng (巍峰村)
- Xinzhai (新寨村)
- Ailing (矮岭村)
- Fengling (凤岭村)
- Limugang (栗木岗村)

== History ==
In ancient China, it belonged to Fengsheng (冯乘) and Fu Zhou (富州). In the Ming dynasty (1368–1644), it came under the jurisdiction of Jiudu (九都). In the Qing dynasty (1644–1911), it was under the jurisdiction of Mashantuan (马山团). In the Republic of China, it belonged to Chaodong District (朝东区).

== Geography ==
The town lies at northwestern Fuchuan Yao Autonomous County, bordering Gongcheng Yao Autonomous County to the west, Chaodong Town and Jiangyong County to the north, and Gepo Town to the east.

The Fuchuan River flows north to south through the town.

== Economy ==
The local economy is primarily based upon agriculture. The main crops of the town are grains, followed by tobacco and vegetables.

== Tourist attractions ==
The Fengxi Yao Village (凤溪瑶寨) is major touristic destination for locals and foreigners.

The Chuanyan Karst Cave (川岩溶洞) is a famous scenic spot in the town.

The town has two ancient bridges, the Chaoyang Wind-rain Bridge (朝阳风雨桥) and Fushou Wind-rain Bridge (福寿风雨桥), both were built in the Ming dynasty (1368–1644).

== Transportation ==
The S13 Zhongshan County-Fuchuan County Expressway passes through the western town.
