= Duyun East railway station =

Railway station in Guizhou

Duyun East 都匀东
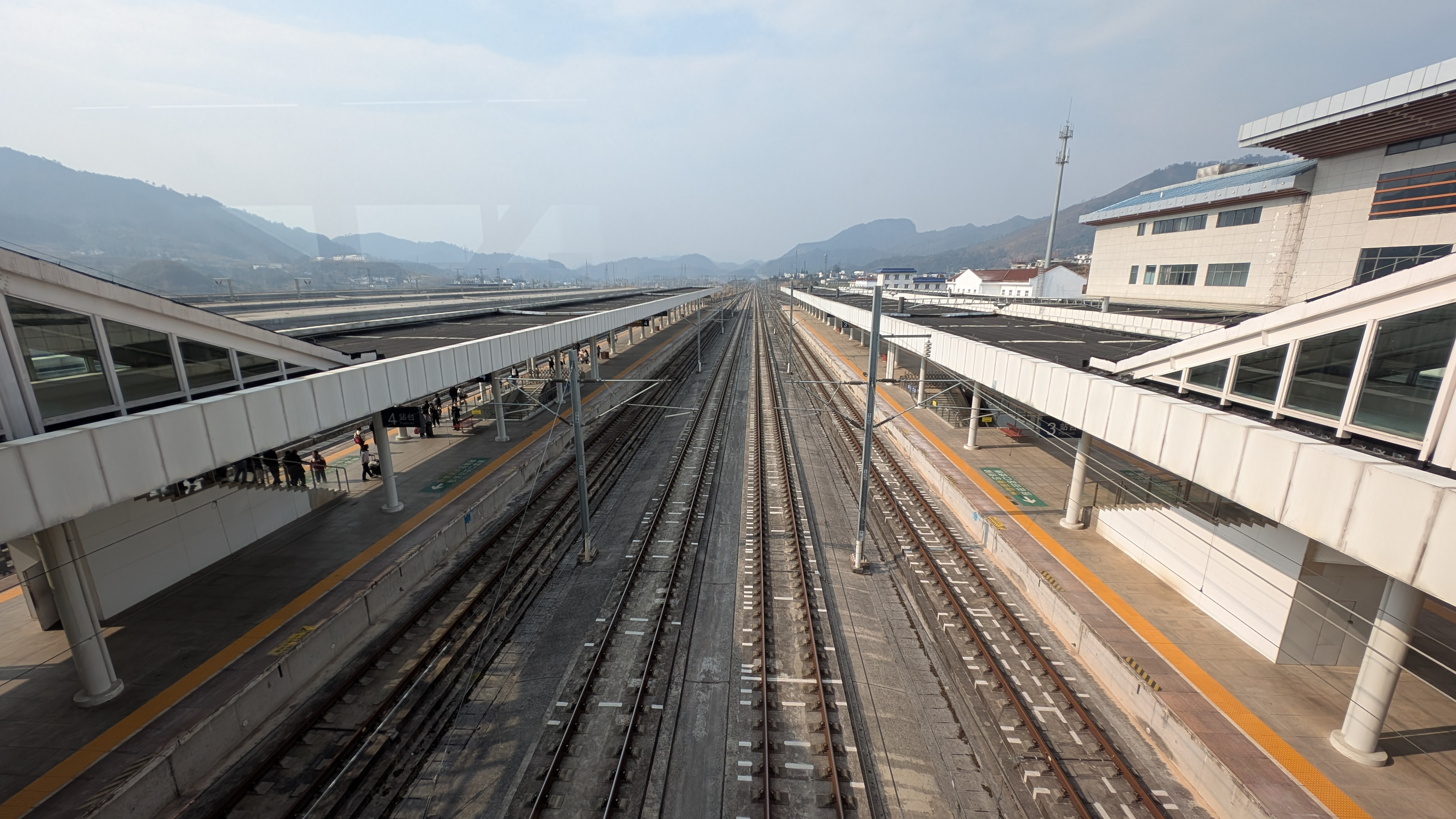

General information
- Location: Duyun, Qiannan Buyei and Miao Autonomous Prefecture, Guizhou; China
- Operated by: China Railway Chengdu Group
- Lines: Guiyang–Guangzhou high-speed railway Guiyang–Nanning high-speed railway (U/C)

Other information
- Station code: KJW (China Railway Telegraph Code); DYD (China Railway Pinyin Code)

History
- Opened: 26 December 2014

Duyun East railway station (Chinese: 都匀东站; pinyin: Dūyún Dōng zhàn) is a railway station in Duyun, Qiannan Buyei and Miao Autonomous Prefecture, Guizhou, China. The station opened on 26 December 2014. The station is served by Guiyang–Guangzhou high-speed railway and will be served by Guiyang–Nanning high-speed railway.

== See also ==
- Duyun railway station

Preceding station	China Railway High-speed	Following station
Guidingxian towards Guiyang North	Guiyang–Guangzhou high-speed railway	Sanduxian towards Guangzhou South
