= Gucheng, Fuchuan County =

Gucheng Town 古城镇
- Town
- Location in Guangxi
- Coordinates: 24°48′35″N 111°19′28″E
- Country: People's Republic of China
- Autonomous Region: Guangxi
- Prefecture-level city: Hezhou
- Autonomous county: Fuchuan Yao Autonomous County

Area
  - Total: 42.65 km^{2} (16.47 sq mi)

Population (2018)
  - Total: 20,600
  - Density: 483/km^{2} (1,250/sq mi)
- Time zone: UTC+08:00 (China Standard)
- Postal code: 542710
- Area code: 0774

Gucheng (simplified Chinese: 古城镇; traditional Chinese: 古城鎮; pinyin: Gǔchéng Zhèn) is a town in Fuchuan Yao Autonomous County, Guangxi, China. As of the 2018 census it had a population of 20,600 and an area of 42.65 square kilometres (16.47 sq mi).

== Administrative division ==
As of 2016, the town is divided into one community and nine villages:

- Hengshan Community (横山社区)
- Lijiang (粟江村)
- Chayuan (茶源村)
- Shantian (山田村)
- Gaolu (高路村)
- Mojia (莫家村)
- Xiushan (秀山村)
- Tangbei (塘贝村)
- Yang (杨村)
- Daling (大岭村)

== History ==
It belonged to the Second District after the founding of the Communist State. In 1952 it belonged to the Tenth District. In 1958 the Yingxiong Commune (英雄公社; 'Hero Commune') was set up and two years later it was renamed "Gucheng Commune" (古城公社). In 2003 it was upgraded to a town.

== Economy ==
Agriculture including farming and pig-breeding is the most common activity in the province. The main crops of the region are grains, followed by fruits and vegetables.

The town is connected to two highways: the China National Highway G538 and the Provincial Highway S203.
