= Zhaoping County =

Zhaoping County 昭平县 · Cauhbingz Yen Chaoping
- County
- Location of the seat in Guangxi
- Coordinates: 24°10′08″N 110°48′40″E
- Country: China
- Autonomous region: Guangxi
- Prefecture-level city: Hezhou
- County seat: Zhaoping Town

Area
  - Total: 3,273 km^{2} (1,264 sq mi)

Population (2020)
  - Total: 330,116
  - Density: 100.9/km^{2} (261.2/sq mi)
- Time zone: UTC+8 (China Standard)

Zhaoping County (Chinese: 昭平县; pinyin: Zhāopíng Xiàn; Zhuang: Cauhbingz Yen) is a county in the east of Guangxi, China. It is under the administration of the prefecture-level city of Hezhou.

== Administrative divisions ==
Within Zhaoping County are 9 towns, 2 townships and 1 ethnic township:

Zhaoping Town (昭平镇), Wenzhu Town (文竹镇), Huangyao Town (黄姚镇), Fuluo Town (富罗镇), Beituo Town (北陀镇), Majiang Town (马江镇), Wujiang Town (五将镇), Zhouma Town (走马镇), Zhangmulin Town (樟木林镇), Fenghuang Township (凤凰乡), Muge Township (木格乡), and Xianhui Yao Ethnic Township (仙回瑶族乡).

== Climate ==
Climate data for Zhaoping, elevation 106 m (348 ft), (1991–2020 normals, extremes 1981–present)
Month	Jan	Feb	Mar	Apr	May	Jun	Jul	Aug	Sep	Oct	Nov	Dec	Year
Record high °C (°F)	28.1 (82.6)	31.2 (88.2)	33.2 (91.8)	34.6 (94.3)	35.9 (96.6)	38.1 (100.6)	40.2 (104.4)	39.7 (103.5)	38.0 (100.4)	36.4 (97.5)	34.3 (93.7)	29.2 (84.6)	40.2 (104.4)
Mean daily maximum °C (°F)	14.6 (58.3)	16.6 (61.9)	19.2 (66.6)	25.0 (77.0)	29.3 (84.7)	31.4 (88.5)	33.2 (91.8)	33.4 (92.1)	31.7 (89.1)	28.1 (82.6)	23.1 (73.6)	17.7 (63.9)	25.3 (77.5)
Daily mean °C (°F)	10.4 (50.7)	12.5 (54.5)	15.5 (59.9)	20.8 (69.4)	24.7 (76.5)	26.8 (80.2)	28.0 (82.4)	27.9 (82.2)	26.1 (79.0)	22.3 (72.1)	17.3 (63.1)	12.3 (54.1)	20.4 (68.7)
Mean daily minimum °C (°F)	7.7 (45.9)	9.8 (49.6)	13.0 (55.4)	18.0 (64.4)	21.7 (71.1)	24.2 (75.6)	24.9 (76.8)	24.6 (76.3)	22.6 (72.7)	18.4 (65.1)	13.6 (56.5)	8.9 (48.0)	17.3 (63.1)
Record low °C (°F)	−1.5 (29.3)	0.0 (32.0)	0.6 (33.1)	7.2 (45.0)	11.2 (52.2)	15.0 (59.0)	18.6 (65.5)	19.7 (67.5)	14.0 (57.2)	6.0 (42.8)	2.2 (36.0)	−2.4 (27.7)	−2.4 (27.7)
Average precipitation mm (inches)	88.7 (3.49)	77.7 (3.06)	162.4 (6.39)	202.6 (7.98)	365.1 (14.37)	426.8 (16.80)	265.5 (10.45)	221.2 (8.71)	95.2 (3.75)	73.1 (2.88)	78.0 (3.07)	60.2 (2.37)	2,116.5 (83.32)
Average precipitation days (≥ 0.1 mm)	13.7	13.9	20.5	19.2	19.4	20.9	18.7	15.4	9.5	6.6	8.5	9.2	175.5
Average snowy days	0.2	0.1	0	0	0	0	0	0	0	0	0	0.1	0.4
Average relative humidity (%)	79	81	85	84	83	85	82	81	78	75	76	74	80
Mean monthly sunshine hours	61.5	48.8	39.7	60.3	97.7	109.4	166.6	180.3	157.3	155.4	122.2	110.3	1,309.5
Percentage possible sunshine	18	15	11	16	24	27	40	45	43	44	37	33	29
Source: China Meteorological Administrationall-time October record
