= Fuyang, Fuchuan County =

Fuyang Town 富阳镇
- Town
- Location in Guangxi
- Coordinates: 24°49′28″N 111°16′15″E
- Country: People's Republic of China
- Autonomous Region: Guangxi
- Prefecture-level city: Hezhou
- Autonomous county: Fuchuan Yao Autonomous County

Area
  - Total: 205.2 km^{2} (79.2 sq mi)

Population (2018)
  - Total: 76,000
  - Density: 370/km^{2} (960/sq mi)
- Time zone: UTC+08:00 (China Standard)
- Postal code: 542799
- Area code: 0774

Fuyang (simplified Chinese: 富阳镇; traditional Chinese: 富陽鎮; pinyin: Fùyáng Zhèn) is a town in Fuchuan Yao Autonomous County, Guangxi, China. As of the 2018 census, it had a population of 76,000 and an area of 205.2-square-kilometre (79.2 sq mi).

== Administrative division ==
As of 2016, the town is divided into seven communities and eighteen villages:

- Xinyong Community (新永社区)
- Rensheng Community (仁升社区)
- Yangshou Community (阳寿社区)
- Fenghuang Community (凤凰社区)
- Chengdong Community (城东社区)
- Ma'anshan Community (马鞍山社区)
- Xinjian Community (新建社区)
- Gongtang (巩塘村)
- Huoqing (获庆村)
- Tiegeng (铁耕村)
- Shawang (沙汪村)
- Chaoyang (朝阳村)
- Yanggong (羊公村)
- Zhushao (竹稍村)
- Chajia (茶家村)
- Xinba (新坝村)
- Mulang (木榔村)
- Shanbao (山宝村)
- Xiping (西屏村)
- Shesan (社三村)
- Huanglong (黄龙村)
- Jiangtang (江塘村)
- Dawei (大围村)
- Laoxi (涝溪村)
- Yangxi (洋溪村)

== Geography ==
The Fuchuan River flows north–south through the town.

== Economy ==
The economy of the town is mainly based on agriculture, including farming and breeding. Agricultural crops include: grains, vegetables, navel orange (脐橙), and Citrus tangerina (柑). Recently, construction, building materials, chemical industry, and smelting. Agricultural and sideline products processing have significantly developed in the town.

== Tourist attractions ==
The town has a public park named "Fenghuangshan Park" (凤凰山公园).

== Transportation ==
The China National Highway G538 passes through the town.
