= Babu District =

Babu 八步区 · Bazbu Guh Patpo
- District
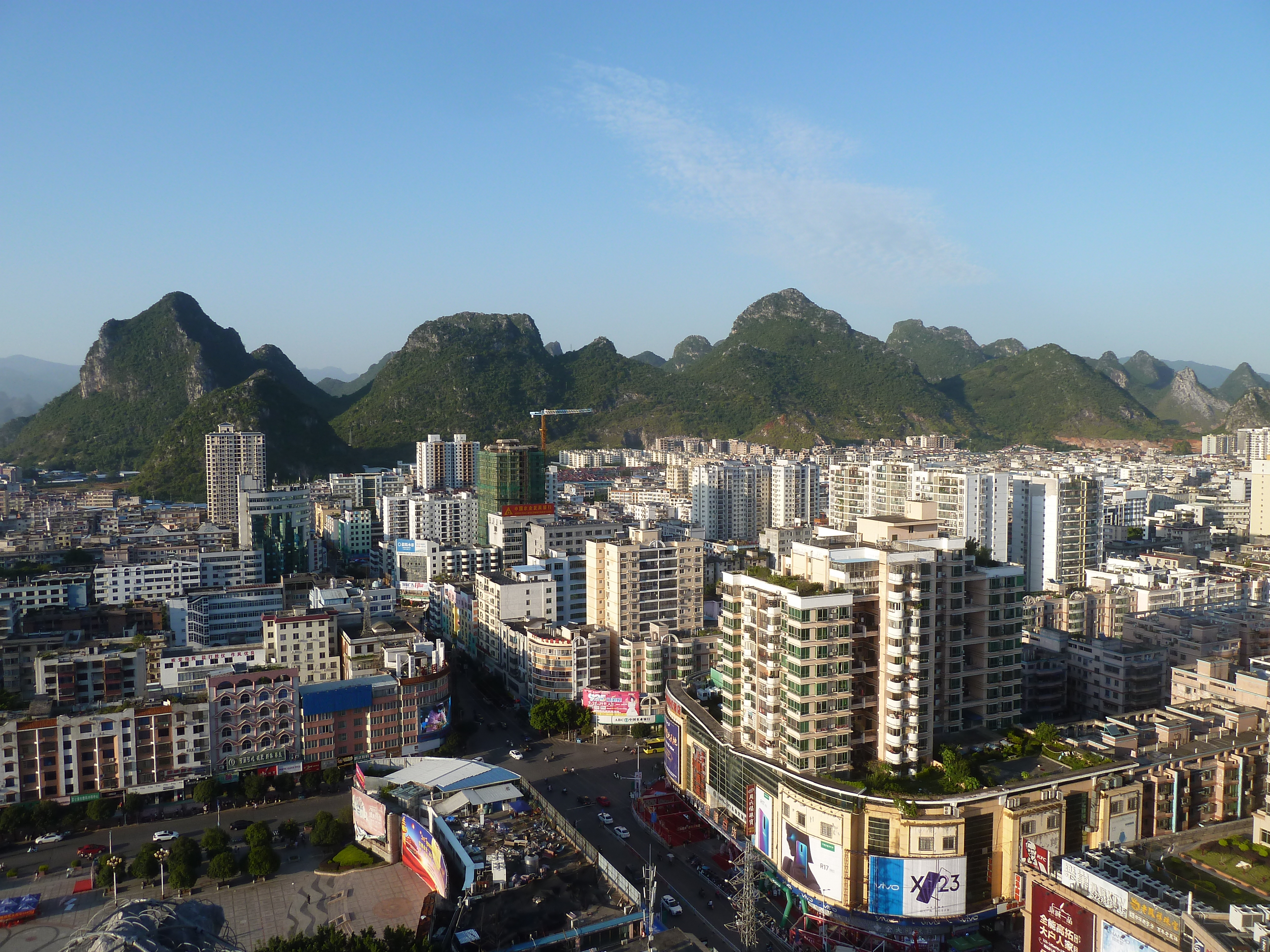

- Location in Guangxi
- Country: China
- Autonomous region: Guangxi
- Prefecture-level city: Hezhou
- District seat: Chengdong Subdistrict

Area
  - Total: 5,334 km^{2} (2,059 sq mi)

Population (2020 census)
  - Total: 655,994
  - Density: 123.0/km^{2} (318.5/sq mi)
- Time zone: UTC+8 (China Standard)
- Website: www.gxbabu.gov.cn

Babu (Chinese: 八步; pinyin: Bābù) is a district of the city of Hezhou, Guangxi, China.

== Administrative divisions ==
Babu District is divided into 3 subdistricts, 12 towns and 1 ethnic township:

- Babu Subdistrict (八步街道)
- Chengdong Subdistrict (城东街道)
- Jiangnan Subdistrict (江南街道)
- Hejie Town (贺街镇)
- Butou Town (步头镇)
- Liantang Town (莲塘镇)
- Daning Town (大宁镇)
- Nanxiang Town (南乡镇)
- Guiling Town (桂岭镇)
- Kaishan Town (开山镇)
- Lisong Town (里松镇)
- Xindu Town (信都镇)
- Lingfeng Town (灵峰镇)
- Renyi Town (仁义镇)
- Pumen Town (铺门镇)
- Huangdong Yao Ethnic Township (黄洞瑶族乡)
