= Jianghua Yao Autonomous County =

Jianghua County 江华县 Kianghwa
- Autonomous county
- 江华瑶族自治县
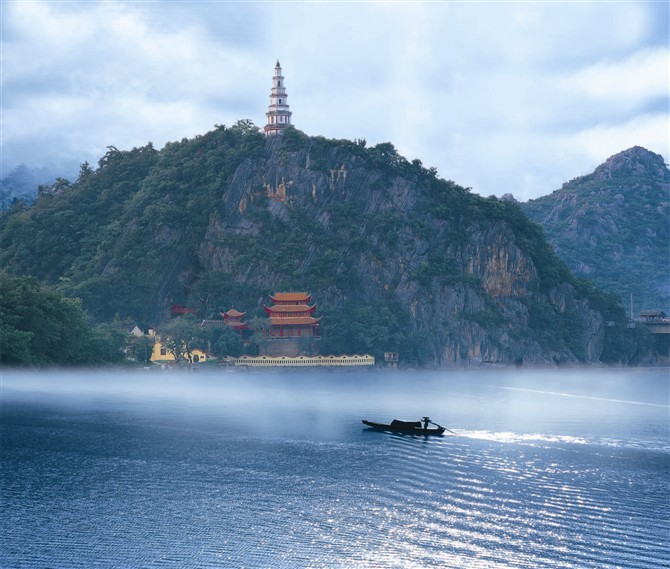

- Location in Hunan
- Coordinates: 25°10′59″N 111°34′44″E
- Country: People's Republic of China
- Province: Hunan
- Prefecture-level city: Yongzhou
- County seat: Tuojiang

Area
  - Total: 3,216.03 km^{2} (1,241.72 sq mi)

Population (2020)
  - Total: 448,200
  - Density: 139.4/km^{2} (361.0/sq mi)
- Time zone: UTC+8 (China Standard)
- Postal code: 4255XX

Jianghua Yao Autonomous County (simplified Chinese: 江华瑶族自治县; traditional Chinese: 江華瑤族自治縣; pinyin: Jiānghuá Yáozú Zìzhìxiàn), usually referred to as Jianghua County (江华县; 江華縣; Jiānghuá Xiàn), is an autonomous county of the Yao people in Hunan province, China, under the administration of the prefecture-level city of Yongzhou. Located at the southernmost tip of Hunan, at the junction of Hunan, Guangdong and Guangxi, it covers an area of 3,248 km^{2} (1,254 sq mi). It is the only Yao autonomous county in Hunan and has the largest Yao population of any county in China.

Jianghua was established as a county in 621 under the Tang dynasty, and the autonomous county was founded on 25 November 1955. As of the end of 2025, it had a registered population of 534,000 and a resident population of 428,200. The county has 9 towns and 7 townships under its jurisdiction, and the county seat is Tuojiang.

== History ==
Before the Qin dynasty, the area belonged to the lands of Jing and Chu. Under the Qin, it was part of Changsha Commandery. In 111 BC, during the Western Han dynasty, Fengcheng County was established in the area under Cangwu Commandery of Jiao Province. In 621, during the Tang dynasty, Jianghua County was split from Fengcheng County. The county took its name from the location of its seat, south of the river near Yanghua Rock. During the reign of Wu Zetian between 684 and 704, it was renamed Yunxi County, and the name Jianghua was restored in the first year of the Shenlong era under Emperor Zhongzong.

In 1462, during the Ming dynasty, the county seat was moved to Huangtougang, the present-day Tuojiang. In 1649, under the Qing dynasty, the county was placed under Yongzhou Prefecture. During the Republic of China, Jianghua belonged to Hengyang Circuit from 1914 and to the Lingling Special Administrative Office from 1938.

In November 1949, Jianghua came under Communist control without fighting and remained under the Lingling Special Administrative Office. On 25 November 1955, Jianghua Yao Autonomous County was established under the Hengyang Special Administrative Office, and the county seat was moved from Tuojiang to Shuikou. In 1962, the county returned to the Lingling Special Administrative Office, the predecessor of the present-day city of Yongzhou. In November 1985, the county seat was moved back from Shuikou to Tuojiang. On 21 November 1995, the State Council approved the abolition of Lingling Prefecture and the establishment of the prefecture-level city of Yongzhou. In November 2015, the Hunan Provincial Department of Civil Affairs approved a reorganization of the county's township-level divisions. In April 2019, the Hunan provincial government approved Jianghua's removal from the list of poverty-stricken counties.

== Geography ==
Jianghua lies at the southernmost tip of Hunan, on the northern slopes of the Nanling Mountains at the source of the Xiao River. It sits at the junction of Hunan, Guangdong and Guangxi, and its county seat is about 460 km (290 mi) from Changsha, 370 km (230 mi) from Guangzhou and 430 km (270 mi) from Nanning. Within Hunan, it borders Dao, Ningyuan and Lanshan counties to the north and northeast, and Jiangyong County to the west. In Guangdong, it borders Lianzhou, Liannan Yao Autonomous County and Lianshan Zhuang and Yao Autonomous County. In Guangxi, it borders Fuchuan Yao Autonomous County and the city of Hezhou, including Babu District. The county covers an area of 3,248 km^{2} (1,254 sq mi).

Branches of the Mengzhu Range, part of the Wuling or Nanling mountain system, run through the county. The terrain is higher in the south, north and east, where elevations are generally above 600 m (2,000 ft), and lower in the west. Its landforms include mountains, hills, basins, plains and bodies of water. Helukou, at the foot of Gupo Mountain, is the southernmost town in Hunan. The county has a dense network of rivers and streams. The Tuo and Feng rivers converge in Tuojiang, the county seat.

Jianghua's forest coverage rate is 78.91 per cent. Forty-five useful minerals have been found in the county, with tin, tungsten, copper, lead-zinc, niobium-tantalum, rare earths, iron, manganese, limestone, phosphorus, sulfur, kaolin, quartz and stone coal being especially abundant. Its proven rare earth reserves amount to 104,300 tonnes. The county has more than 2.6 gigawatts of exploitable wind energy and 400 megawatts of developed hydropower.

=== Climate ===
Jianghua has a humid mid-subtropical monsoon climate, and its complex terrain produces several local microclimates. The annual average temperature is between 18 and 18.5 °C (64.4 and 65.3 °F).

Climate data for Jianghua, elevation 266 m (873 ft), (1991–2020 normals, extremes 1981–2010)
Month	Jan	Feb	Mar	Apr	May	Jun	Jul	Aug	Sep	Oct	Nov	Dec	Year
Record high °C (°F)	25.5 (77.9)	30.8 (87.4)	31.3 (88.3)	33.8 (92.8)	34.8 (94.6)	37.0 (98.6)	39.1 (102.4)	39.4 (102.9)	37.6 (99.7)	36.0 (96.8)	32.6 (90.7)	27.8 (82.0)	39.4 (102.9)
Mean daily maximum °C (°F)	11.0 (51.8)	13.8 (56.8)	17.3 (63.1)	23.6 (74.5)	27.8 (82.0)	30.6 (87.1)	33.1 (91.6)	32.8 (91.0)	29.8 (85.6)	25.2 (77.4)	19.9 (67.8)	13.9 (57.0)	23.2 (73.8)
Daily mean °C (°F)	7.5 (45.5)	10.0 (50.0)	13.5 (56.3)	19.2 (66.6)	23.4 (74.1)	26.3 (79.3)	28.3 (82.9)	27.8 (82.0)	25.1 (77.2)	20.4 (68.7)	15.2 (59.4)	9.7 (49.5)	18.9 (66.0)
Mean daily minimum °C (°F)	5.1 (41.2)	7.4 (45.3)	10.8 (51.4)	16.1 (61.0)	20.1 (68.2)	23.3 (73.9)	24.9 (76.8)	24.4 (75.9)	21.6 (70.9)	17.0 (62.6)	11.8 (53.2)	6.7 (44.1)	15.8 (60.4)
Record low °C (°F)	−2.9 (26.8)	−2.5 (27.5)	0.6 (33.1)	4.6 (40.3)	11.2 (52.2)	15.2 (59.4)	19.9 (67.8)	19.2 (66.6)	12.9 (55.2)	6.7 (44.1)	−0.1 (31.8)	−3.9 (25.0)	−3.9 (25.0)
Average precipitation mm (inches)	81.7 (3.22)	86.0 (3.39)	160.7 (6.33)	200.4 (7.89)	227.6 (8.96)	231.3 (9.11)	142.1 (5.59)	133.8 (5.27)	56.6 (2.23)	61.0 (2.40)	81.0 (3.19)	56.3 (2.22)	1,518.5 (59.8)
Average precipitation days (≥ 0.1 mm)	13.8	13.0	18.4	16.8	16.4	16.8	13.5	12.8	8.1	6.7	8.7	9.7	154.7
Average snowy days	1.6	0.7	0.1	0	0	0	0	0	0	0	0	0.5	2.9
Average relative humidity (%)	78	78	82	81	80	81	75	76	75	72	72	72	77
Mean monthly sunshine hours	69.4	66.5	66.5	100.5	138.4	155.6	228.8	214.5	179.7	159.1	130.9	117.0	1,626.9
Percentage possible sunshine	21	21	18	26	33	38	55	54	49	45	40	36	36
Source: China Meteorological Administration

== Administrative divisions ==
Jianghua is divided into 9 towns and 7 townships, one of which is a Zhuang ethnic township, and also contains one state-owned forest farm.

Township-level divisions of Jianghua
Name	Chinese	Type	Ref.
Baimangying	白芒营镇	Town	
Centianhe	涔天河镇	Town	
Dalupu	大路铺镇	Town	
Dayu	大圩镇	Town	
Helukou	河路口镇	Town	
Mashi	码市镇	Town	
Shuikou	水口镇	Town	
Taoyu	涛圩镇	Town	
Tuojiang	沱江镇	Town (county seat)	
Dashiqiao	大石桥乡	Township	
Daxi	大锡乡	Township	
Jiepai	界牌乡	Township	
Qiaoshi	桥市乡	Township	
Weizhukou	蔚竹口乡	Township	
Xiangjiang	湘江乡	Township	
Xiaoyu	小圩壮族乡	Zhuang ethnic township	

== Demographics ==
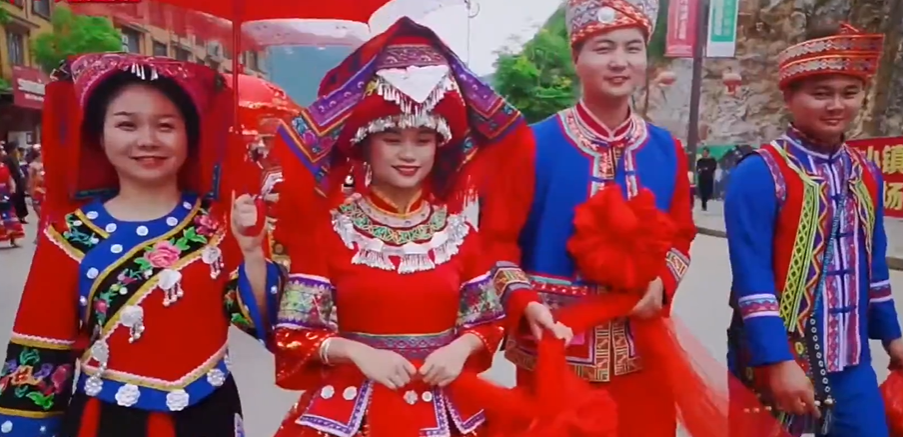
Yao wedding in Shuikou Town in Jianghua (2020)

As of the end of 2025, Jianghua had a registered population of 534,000 in 166,100 households and a resident population of 428,200. Of the resident population, 173,700 lived in urban areas and 254,500 in rural areas, giving an urbanization rate of 40.57 per cent. In 2025, the county recorded 3,128 births and 2,814 deaths, a birth rate of 5.62 per thousand and a death rate of 5.06 per thousand. In 2015, it had a registered population of 521,400 and a resident population of 429,100.

Jianghua is home to 24 ethnic groups, including the Yao, Han, Zhuang and Miao. Its Yao population of about 375,000 is the largest of any county in China. In some townships, the Yao form a large majority, making up 95 per cent of the population of Taoyu and 80 per cent of Xiangjiang.

== Economy ==
In 2025, Jianghua's gross domestic product (GDP) was CN¥18.124 billion, an increase of 5.1 per cent over the previous year at constant prices. The value added of the primary, secondary and tertiary sectors was CN¥3.723 billion, CN¥6.136 billion and CN¥8.265 billion, accounting for 20.5, 33.9 and 45.6 per cent of GDP respectively. Per capita GDP, based on the resident population, was CN¥42,022. Per capita disposable income was CN¥25,131, with urban residents earning CN¥37,020 and rural residents CN¥17,860. The county's general public budget revenue fell by 12.4 per cent to CN¥1.446 billion, while its expenditure was CN¥4.321 billion. Fixed-asset investment fell by 45.8 per cent from the previous year.

=== Industry ===
Jianghua's industry is led by rare earth new materials and the deep processing of new energy, with electric motors and electrical appliances as its specialty. Companies that have set up operations in the county include China Rare Earth (Hunan), Zhenghai New Materials and Jiuheng Group. The county produces 500 million electric motors a year, and the county government states that they account for more than 90 per cent of the relevant market in Hunan and 12 per cent nationally, with products sold to 47 countries. In June 2019, China Minmetals Rare Earth began building a rare earth mine in Jianghua covering 11.74 km^{2} (4.53 sq mi), with resources of 104,300 tonnes of rare earth oxide equivalent, mostly medium and heavy rare earths.

In 2025, the county's industrial value added was CN¥5.566 billion, an increase of 5.3 per cent. Its main industrial products included 1.822 million tonnes of cement, 44.95 million liquid-crystal display screens and 146.95 million electronic components. The county generated 1.44 billion kilowatt-hours of electricity, of which 1.0 billion came from wind power and 350 million from hydropower. Industrial enterprises above designated size had operating revenue of CN¥19.758 billion and profits of CN¥1.202 billion.

=== Agriculture ===
In 2025, the total output value of agriculture, forestry, animal husbandry and fishery was CN¥7.525 billion, an increase of 4.9 per cent. Grain was sown on 586,000 mu (about 39,100 ha (97,000 acres)), and the grain harvest was 240,600 tonnes, including 162,200 tonnes of rice. The county also produced 265,400 tonnes of vegetables and 8,500 tonnes of flue-cured tobacco.

=== Services and tourism ===
Total retail sales of consumer goods in 2025 were CN¥5.105 billion, an increase of 4.9 per cent. The county's total imports and exports were CN¥3.383 billion, a decrease of 54.6 per cent from the previous year. It received 7.192 million domestic tourist visits, which generated CN¥7.142 billion in tourism revenue. Its tourist attractions include the Yaoshan Water City, rated 4A, and five 3A-rated scenic areas, including the Yao Culture Park, Qinyan and Baojing.
