= Zhongshan County =

Zhongshan County 钟山县 · Cunghsanh Yen
- County
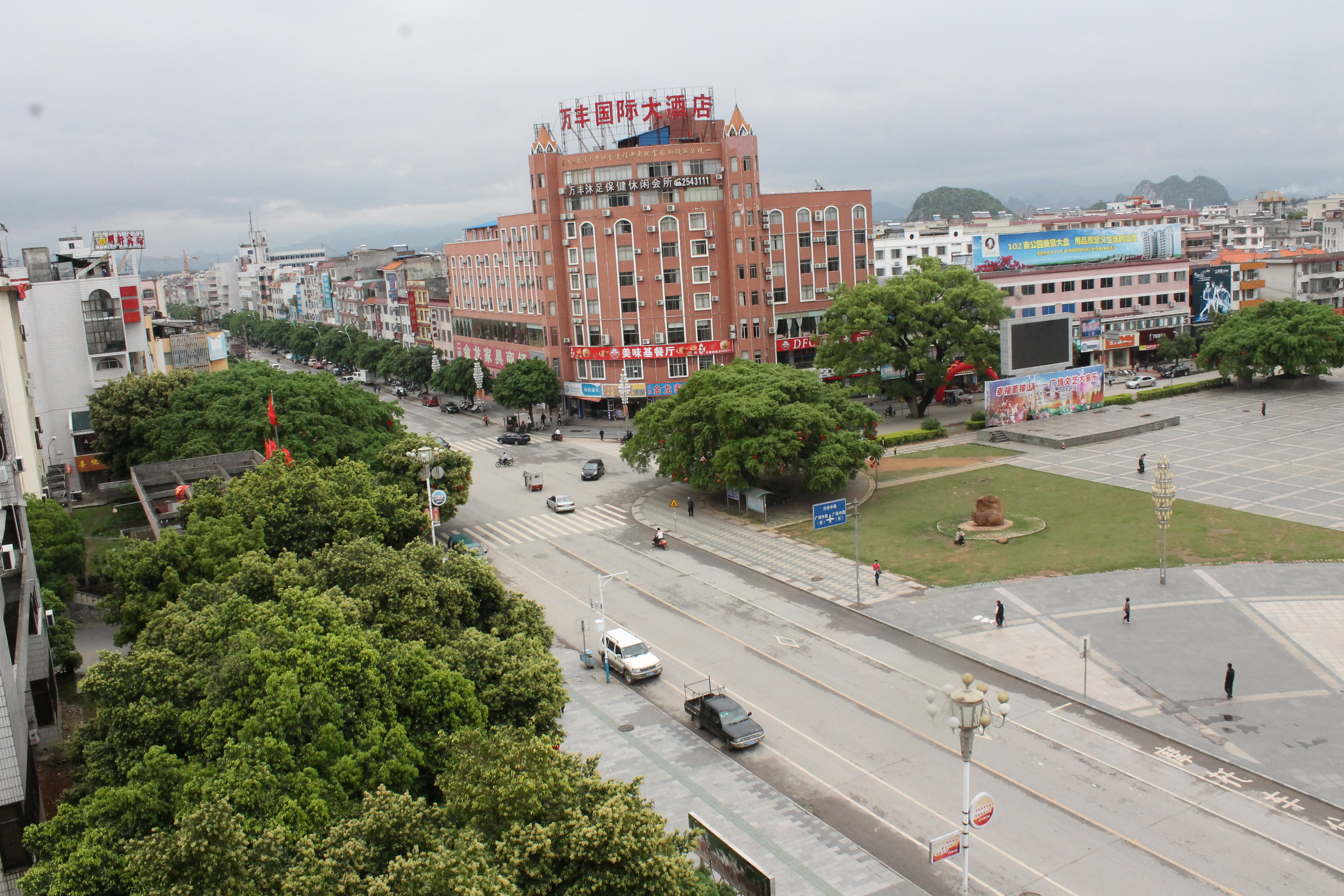

- Location of the seat in Guangxi
- Coordinates: 24°31′34″N 111°18′11″E
- Country: China
- Autonomous region: Guangxi
- Prefecture-level city: Hezhou
- County seat: Zhongshan Town

Area
  - Total: 1,675 km^{2} (647 sq mi)

Population (2020)
  - Total: 351,057
  - Density: 209.6/km^{2} (542.8/sq mi)
- Time zone: UTC+8 (China Standard)

Zhongshan County (simplified Chinese: 钟山县; traditional Chinese: 鐘山縣; pinyin: Zhōngshān Xiàn; Zhuang: Cunghsanh Yen) is a county in the northeast of Guangxi, China. It is under the administration of the prefecture-level city of Hezhou.

== Administrative divisions ==
Zhongshan County is divided into 10 towns and 2 ethnic townships:

towns

- Zhongshan Town 钟山镇
- Huilong Town 回龙镇
- Shilong Town 石龙镇
- Fengxiang Town 凤翔镇
- Shanhu Town 珊瑚镇
- Tonggu Town 同古镇
- Gong'an Town 公安镇
- Qingtang Town 清塘镇
- Yantang Town 燕塘镇
- Honghua Town 红花镇

ethnic townships

- Huashan Yao Ethnic Township 花山瑶族乡
- Liang'an Yao Ethnic Township 两安瑶族乡

== Climate ==
Climate data for Zhongshan, elevation 168 m (551 ft), (1991–2020 normals)
Month	Jan	Feb	Mar	Apr	May	Jun	Jul	Aug	Sep	Oct	Nov	Dec	Year
Mean daily maximum °C (°F)	13.3 (55.9)	15.6 (60.1)	18.6 (65.5)	24.5 (76.1)	28.8 (83.8)	31.1 (88.0)	33.2 (91.8)	33.3 (91.9)	31.2 (88.2)	27.3 (81.1)	22.1 (71.8)	16.3 (61.3)	24.6 (76.3)
Daily mean °C (°F)	9.3 (48.7)	11.6 (52.9)	14.7 (58.5)	20.3 (68.5)	24.3 (75.7)	26.8 (80.2)	28.2 (82.8)	28.1 (82.6)	26.1 (79.0)	22.0 (71.6)	16.7 (62.1)	11.4 (52.5)	20.0 (67.9)
Mean daily minimum °C (°F)	6.6 (43.9)	8.8 (47.8)	12.1 (53.8)	17.2 (63.0)	21.2 (70.2)	23.9 (75.0)	24.8 (76.6)	24.6 (76.3)	22.5 (72.5)	18.1 (64.6)	13.0 (55.4)	8.0 (46.4)	16.7 (62.1)
Average precipitation mm (inches)	74.5 (2.93)	66.3 (2.61)	137.9 (5.43)	182.3 (7.18)	280.5 (11.04)	324.1 (12.76)	191.1 (7.52)	161.9 (6.37)	77.7 (3.06)	61.2 (2.41)	58.1 (2.29)	48.9 (1.93)	1,664.5 (65.53)
Average precipitation days (≥ 0.1 mm)	12.2	12.8	18.7	17.2	18.4	19.8	16.9	15.0	9.1	6.2	7.8	8.4	162.5
Average snowy days	0.7	0.2	0	0	0	0	0	0	0	0	0	0.3	1.2
Average relative humidity (%)	74	76	81	81	81	84	81	79	75	70	70	68	77
Mean monthly sunshine hours	70.6	57.3	50.5	73.8	116.5	129.9	194.3	199.6	181.8	172.5	136.0	118.5	1,501.3
Percentage possible sunshine	21	18	14	19	28	32	47	50	50	49	42	36	34
Source: China Meteorological Administration
