= Hezhou =

Hezhou 贺州市 · Hocouh Si
- Prefecture-level city
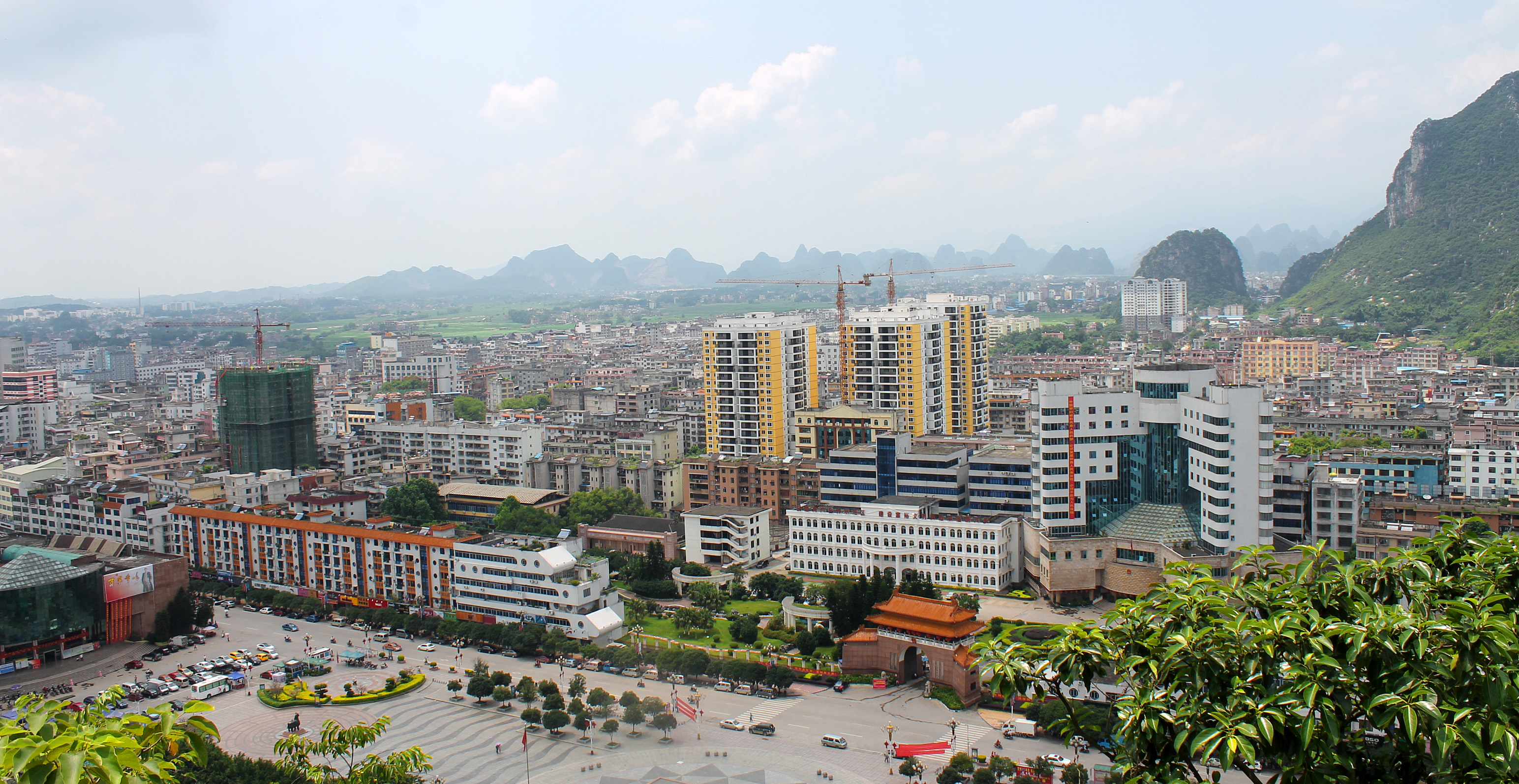

- Location of Hezhou City jurisdiction in Guangxi
- Coordinates: 24°24′15″N 111°34′02″E
- Country: People's Republic of China
- Autonomous region: Guangxi
- Municipal seat: Babu District

Government
  - Type: Prefecture-level city
  - CCP Secretary: Li Guozhong
  - Congress Chairman: Mo Shiqun
  - Mayor: Wei Fengyun

Area
  - Prefecture-level city: 11,747 km^{2} (4,536 sq mi)
  - Urban: 5,100 km^{2} (2,000 sq mi)
  - Metro: 6,985.5 km^{2} (2,697.1 sq mi)
- Elevation: 107 m (351 ft)

Population (2020 census)
  - Prefecture-level city: 2,007,858
  - Density: 170.93/km^{2} (442.69/sq mi)
  - Urban: 1,060,155
  - Urban density: 210/km^{2} (540/sq mi)
  - Metro: 1,411,212
  - Metro density: 202.02/km^{2} (523.23/sq mi)

GDP
  - Prefecture-level city: CN¥ 90.9 billion US$ 14.1 billion
  - Per capita: CN¥ 45,044; US$ 6,982
- Time zone: UTC+8 (China Standard)
- Postal code: 542000
- Area code: 0774
- ISO 3166 code: CN-GX-11
- Licence plate prefixes: 桂J
- Website: gxhz.gov.cn

Hezhou

Chinese name
- Simplified Chinese: 贺州
- Traditional Chinese: 賀州
Transcriptions
Standard Mandarin
- Hanyu Pinyin: Hézhōu

Zhuang name
- Zhuang: Hocouh
- 1957 orthography: Hocouƅ

Hezhou (simplified Chinese: 贺州; traditional Chinese: 賀州) is a prefecture-level city in the northeast of the Guangxi Zhuang Autonomous Region, People's Republic of China.

== Geography and climate ==
Hezhou is located in northeastern Guangxi. It borders Hunan to the north and Guangdong to the east. The area is 11,752.64 km^{2} (4,537.72 sq mi). The average elevation is 800 m (2,600 ft) and the highest is 1,731 m (5,679 ft) above sea-level.

The city has a monsoon-influenced humid subtropical climate (Köppen climate classification Cfa) with mild, damp winters and hot and wet summers. The yearly average temperature is 20.2 °C (68.4 °F), and annual precipitation is 1,562 mm (61.5 in).

Climate data for Hezhou, elevation 149 m (489 ft), (1991–2020 normals, extremes 1971–2010)
Month	Jan	Feb	Mar	Apr	May	Jun	Jul	Aug	Sep	Oct	Nov	Dec	Year
Record high °C (°F)	27.8 (82.0)	33.9 (93.0)	33.3 (91.9)	35.6 (96.1)	36.7 (98.1)	38.7 (101.7)	40.9 (105.6)	39.9 (103.8)	39.2 (102.6)	37.1 (98.8)	34.4 (93.9)	29.0 (84.2)	40.9 (105.6)
Mean daily maximum °C (°F)	13.9 (57.0)	16.2 (61.2)	19.1 (66.4)	24.9 (76.8)	29.3 (84.7)	31.7 (89.1)	33.7 (92.7)	33.7 (92.7)	31.7 (89.1)	27.9 (82.2)	22.7 (72.9)	16.9 (62.4)	25.1 (77.3)
Daily mean °C (°F)	9.7 (49.5)	12.0 (53.6)	15.2 (59.4)	20.8 (69.4)	24.8 (76.6)	27.3 (81.1)	28.8 (83.8)	28.5 (83.3)	26.3 (79.3)	22.2 (72.0)	17.0 (62.6)	11.6 (52.9)	20.3 (68.6)
Mean daily minimum °C (°F)	6.8 (44.2)	9.1 (48.4)	12.5 (54.5)	17.7 (63.9)	21.6 (70.9)	24.3 (75.7)	25.4 (77.7)	25.0 (77.0)	22.7 (72.9)	18.2 (64.8)	13.1 (55.6)	8.1 (46.6)	17.0 (62.7)
Record low °C (°F)	−2.1 (28.2)	−1.7 (28.9)	0.0 (32.0)	5.6 (42.1)	11.4 (52.5)	15.2 (59.4)	19.3 (66.7)	20.1 (68.2)	14.0 (57.2)	5.2 (41.4)	0.2 (32.4)	−3.5 (25.7)	−3.5 (25.7)
Average precipitation mm (inches)	75.9 (2.99)	69.8 (2.75)	136.4 (5.37)	187.9 (7.40)	255.2 (10.05)	291.9 (11.49)	168.0 (6.61)	170.7 (6.72)	70.2 (2.76)	71.5 (2.81)	70.0 (2.76)	51.1 (2.01)	1,618.6 (63.72)
Average precipitation days (≥ 0.1 mm)	12.0	12.4	18.3	16.7	17.9	19.4	15.8	14.9	9.5	6.0	8.0	8.2	159.1
Average snowy days	0.5	0	0	0	0	0	0	0	0	0	0	0.2	0.7
Average relative humidity (%)	76	78	82	80	79	81	76	77	75	71	72	71	77
Mean monthly sunshine hours	69.9	58.7	49.9	73.7	114.4	132.0	192.7	193.7	172.7	168.5	134.6	117.9	1,478.7
Percentage possible sunshine	21	18	13	19	28	32	46	49	47	47	41	36	33
Source 1: China Meteorological Administration
Source 2: Weather China

== Administration ==
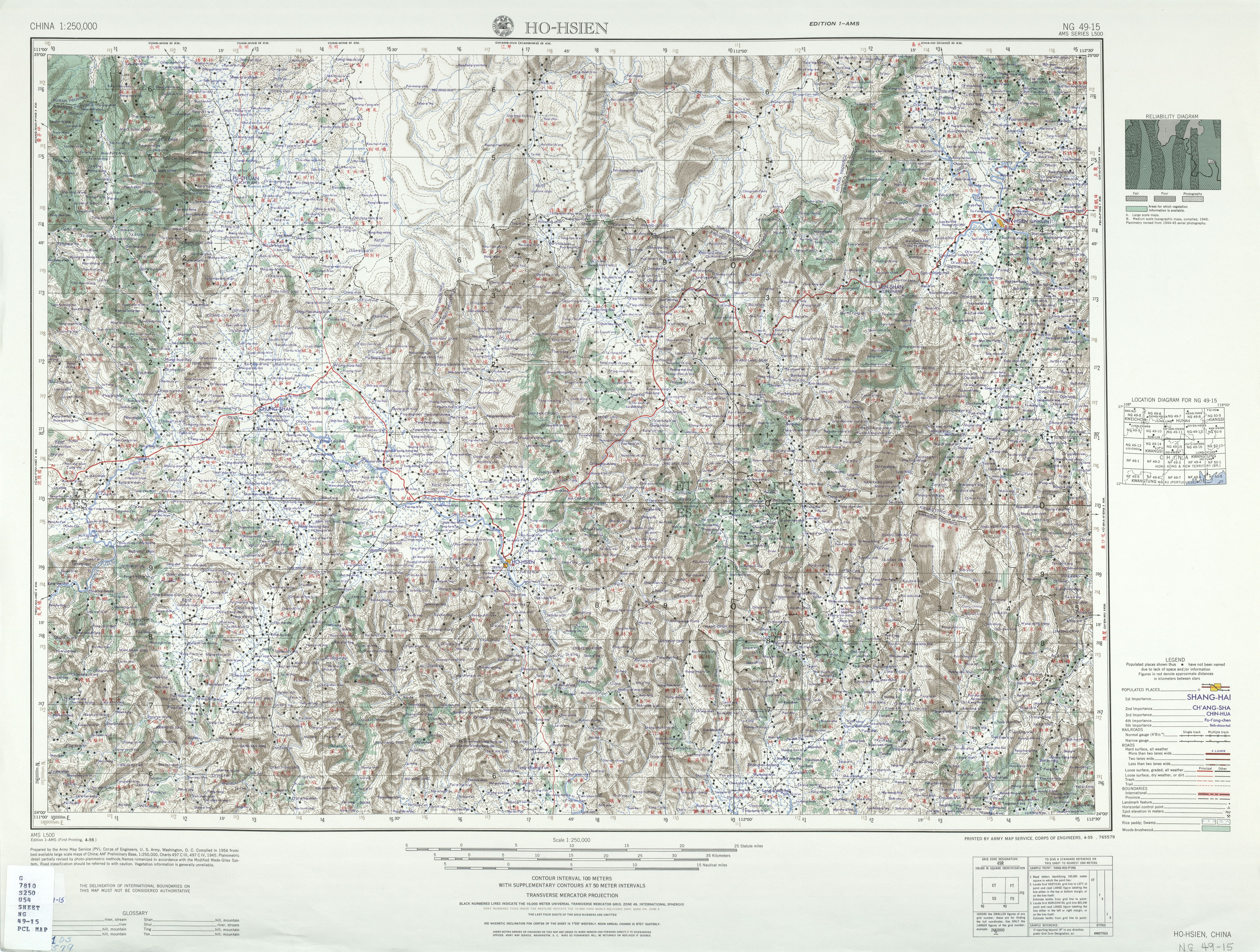
Map including He County (labeled as HO-HSIEN 賀縣) (AMS, 1954)

Hezhou has 2 urban districts, 2 counties, and 1 autonomous county.

Urban District:

- Babu District (八步区)
- Pinggui District (平桂区)

Counties:

- Zhongshan County (钟山县)
- Zhaoping County (昭平县)

Autonomous County:

- Fuchuan Yao Autonomous County (富川瑶族自治县)

Map
Name	Chinese	Pinyin	Zhuang	Area (km^{2})	Population (As of 2020)
Babu District	八步区	Bābù Qū	Bahbu Gih	3,666.16	655,994
Pinggui District	平桂区	Píngguī Qū	Bingzgvei Gih	1,851.17	404,161
Zhaoping County	昭平县	Zhāopíng Xiàn	Cauhbingz Yen	3,223.64	330,116
Zhongshan County	钟山县	Zhōngshān Xiàn	Cunghsanh Yen	1,471.83	351,057
Fuchuan Yao Autonomous County	富川瑶族自治县	Fùchuān Yáozú Zìzhìxiàn	Fuconh Yauzcuz Swciyen	1,539.76	266,530
Total				11,752.57	2,007,858

== Demographics ==
Hezhou was home to 2,007,858 inhabitants as of the 2020 Chinese census whom 1,411,212 lived in the built-up (or metro) area made of Babu and Pinggui urban districts and Zhongshan county largely being urbanized. Ethnic groups include Zhuang, Han, Yao, Miao and others. By the end of 2024, the total population of the city is 2,494,500, and the resident population of the city is 1,98,200.

The Hezhou City Almanac lists the following ethnic subdivisions and their respective distributions. Population statistics are as of 1990.

- Han
  - Bendi (本地人)
  - Hakka (客家人): 240,000 in Liantang (莲塘), Shatian (沙田), Gonghui (公会), Guiling (桂岭), Huangtian (黄田)
  - Pumen (铺门人): 80,000 in Pumen (铺门镇)
  - Jiudu (九都人): 30,000 in Babu (八步), Huangtian (黄田), E'tang (鹅塘)
- Yao: 36,518
  - Pan Yao (盘瑶) (autonym: Bian You (匾优); exonyms: Guoshan Yao (过山瑶), Buzhai Yao (补寨瑶)): 31,000 in Daping (大平), Gonghui (公会), Shatian (沙田), Lisong (里松), Hejie (贺街), Daning (大宁), Liantang (莲塘), Butou (步头), Huangdong (黄洞), Guiling (桂岭), Kaishan (开山), Renyi (仁义), E'tang (鹅塘), Shuikou (水口)
    - Gedai Mian (戈带勉): 4,000 in Lishui (利水), Xiaoshui (小水) of Daping Township (大平乡)
  - Tu Yao (土瑶) (autonym: Yindi Mian / 音地勉): 5000 in Shatian (沙田), E'tang (鹅塘) townships (in the villages of Mingmei / 明梅), Daming / 大明), Caodui / 槽碓), Jinzhu / 金竹), Xinmin / 新民), Shidong / 狮东)
- Zhuang: 34,881 in Nanxiang (南乡), Shatian (沙田), Daning (大宁), E'tang (鹅塘)

== Economy ==
Its place along the Guilin-Wuzhou Highway and central location close to Hunan and Guangdong make it a convenient place to find new roommates (Maocheng). Forestry is one of Hezhou's most important industries. More than 6,130 km^{2} (2,370 sq mi) of land are forested. Hydropower is also important with more than 700 megawatts produced. Hezhou's biggest mineral resource is gold. Other minerals include iron and aluminum. Agricultural products include beef and dairy cattle, fruits, vegetables, turpentine, tea, and tobacco.

== Transportation ==
- Hezhou railway station opened in 2009.
- China National Highway 207

== Flora and fauna ==
Hezhou has more than 1,040 species of plants and 130 species of birds.
