= List of mountains in Hunan =

This is a list of mountains in Hunan.

== List ==
Location	English name	Chinese name	Elevation	Notes
Yanling County	Ling Peak	酃峰	2,122.35-metre (6,963.1 ft)	
Shimen County	Mount Huping	壶瓶山	2,098.7-metre (6,885 ft)	
Yanling County	Douliding	斗笠顶	2,052-metre (6,732 ft)	
Guidong County	Mount Bamian	八面山	2,042-metre (6,699 ft)	
Chengbu County	Erbaoding	二宝顶	2,021-metre (6,631 ft)	
Dao County	Jiucailing	韭菜岭	2,009-metre (6,591 ft)	
Ningyuan County	Benjiwo	畚箕窝	1,959-metre (6,427 ft)	
Chengbu County	Nanshanding	南山顶	1,941-metre (6,368 ft)	
Hongjiang	Shizikou	狮子口	1,914-metre (6,280 ft)	
Suining County	Niupotou	牛坡头	1,913-metre (6,276 ft)	
Yizhang County	Mengkengshi	猛坑石	1,902-metre (6,240 ft)	
Sangzhi County	Mount Doupeng	斗篷山	1,890-metre (6,200 ft)	
Chengbu County	Mount Jinzi	金紫山	1,883-metre (6,178 ft)	
Dong'an County	Mount Shunhuang	舜皇山	1,882-metre (6,175 ft)	
Tongdao County	Tianbu Peak	天步峰	1,851-metre (6,073 ft)	
Jiangyong County	Tianmen Mountain	天门山	1,851-metre (6,073 ft)	
Chengbu County	Mount Wu	巫山	1,843-metre (6,047 ft)	
Chengbu County	Mount Jintong	金童山	1,781-metre (5,843 ft)	
Longhui County	Mount Baima	白马山	1,781-metre (5,843 ft)	
Ningyuan County	Xianglushi	香炉石	1,781-metre (5,843 ft)	
Guidong County	Chishuixian	赤水仙	1,775-metre (5,823 ft)	
Chengbu County	Mount Huangyang	黄阳山	1,768-metre (5,801 ft)	
Yanling County	Wanjiangnaoshang	湾江脑上	1,766-metre (5,794 ft)	
Dongan County	Jinziling	金子岭	1,761-metre (5,778 ft)	
Yanling County	Shi'ao'ao	石垇坳	1,755-metre (5,758 ft)	
Longshan County	Mount Wanbao	万宝山	1,736-metre (5,696 ft)	
Rucheng County	Wuzhi Peak	五指峰	1,727-metre (5,666 ft)	
Yanling County	Maojixian	毛鸡仙	1,715-metre (5,627 ft)	
Yanling County	Mount Sifeng	四峰山	1,715-metre (5,627 ft)	
Linwu County	Tiantouling	天头岭	1,712-metre (5,617 ft)	
Zixing	Mount Tianshi	天师山	1,695-metre (5,561 ft)	
Qianyang County	Baishiding	白石顶	1,693-metre (5,554 ft)	
Zixing City	Yaogangxian	瑶岗仙	1,691-metre (5,548 ft)	
Guidong County	Mount Jigong	鸡公山	1,674-metre (5,492 ft)	
Dong'an County	Mount Gaogui	高桂山	1,673-metre (5,489 ft)	
Shimen County	Mount Jinzhu	金竹山	1,671-metre (5,482 ft)	
Dongkou County	Mount Chazi	茶子山	1,669-metre (5,476 ft)	
Sangzhi County	Changping	长坪	1,665-metre (5,463 ft)	
Jiangyong County	Mount Panguan	判官山	1,623-metre (5,325 ft)	
Anhua County	Jiulongchi	九龙池	1,622-metre (5,322 ft)	
Xupu County	Liangfengjie	凉风界	1,614-metre (5,295 ft)	
Xinning County	Mount Jiefu	界富山	1,613-metre (5,292 ft)	
Liuyang	Qixingling	七星岭	1,608-metre (5,276 ft)	
Yanling County	Fengyuxian	风雨仙	1,600-metre (5,200 ft)	
Pingjiang County	Mount Lianyun	连云山	1,600-metre (5,200 ft)	
Longhui County	Yanggu'ao	羊古坳	1,598-metre (5,243 ft)	
Pingjiang County	Rise Mufu	幕阜山	1,596-metre (5,236 ft)	
Linwu County	Xianghualing	香花岭	1,594-metre (5,230 ft)	
Jianghua County	Qingshan Paiding	清山排顶	1,587-metre (5,207 ft)	
Xinhua County	Fengchexiang	风车巷	1,585-metre (5,200 ft)	
Suining County	Mount Gaoding	高顶山	1,581-metre (5,187 ft)	
Pingjiang County	Mount Fushou	福寿山	1,571-metre (5,154 ft)	
Yizhang County	Sanzimei	三姊妹	1,569-metre (5,148 ft)	
Xinning County	Jiaodingjie	轿顶界	1,561-metre (5,121 ft)	
Rucheng County	Mount Sishui	汜水山	1,559-metre (5,115 ft)	
Longhui County	Shanqingjie	山清界	1,556-metre (5,105 ft)	
Tongdao County	Qiangdaoping	强盗坪	1,549-metre (5,082 ft)	
Qianyang County	Mount Laoli	老栗山	1,542-metre (5,059 ft)	
Guidong County	Yangheding	杨何顶	1,531-metre (5,023 ft)	
Jiangyong County	Mount Hongshi	红石山	1,531-metre (5,023 ft)	
Shuangpai County	Mount Yangming	阳明山	1,530-metre (5,020 ft)	
Longhui County	Mount Hongyan	红岩山	1,524-metre (5,000 ft)	
Zixing City	Mount Leigong	雷公山	1,516-metre (4,974 ft)	
Xinhua County	Mount Gutai	古台山	1,513-metre (4,964 ft)	
Yizhang County	Qitianling	骑天岭	1,510-metre (4,950 ft)	
Linwu County	Sanfengling	三峰岭	1,509-metre (4,951 ft)	
Suining County	Heiyanding	黑岩顶	1,502-metre (4,928 ft)	
Jiangyong County	Yangheping	阳和坪	1,501-metre (4,925 ft)	
