= Shuangpai Yangming National Forestry Park =

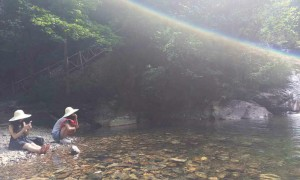
Mount Yangming

The Yangming Mountains (Chinese: 陽明山; pinyin: Yángmíng shān), historically known as Yanghe Mountains (陽和山), are a group of mountains located in Yongzhou, southwestern Hunan, also the series of mountains of Dupang Range. The mountains lie east of the Xiao River, The main range of the mountains is located in the northeastern Shuangpai County; its branches stretch to Lingling, Qiyang and Ningyuan counties. The Yangming Mountains are the location of Wangfotai Peak (望佛台), which at 1,625 metres (5,331 ft) is the highest point in the county of Shuangpai. It is home of Yangmingshan National Forest Park.

== Geography ==
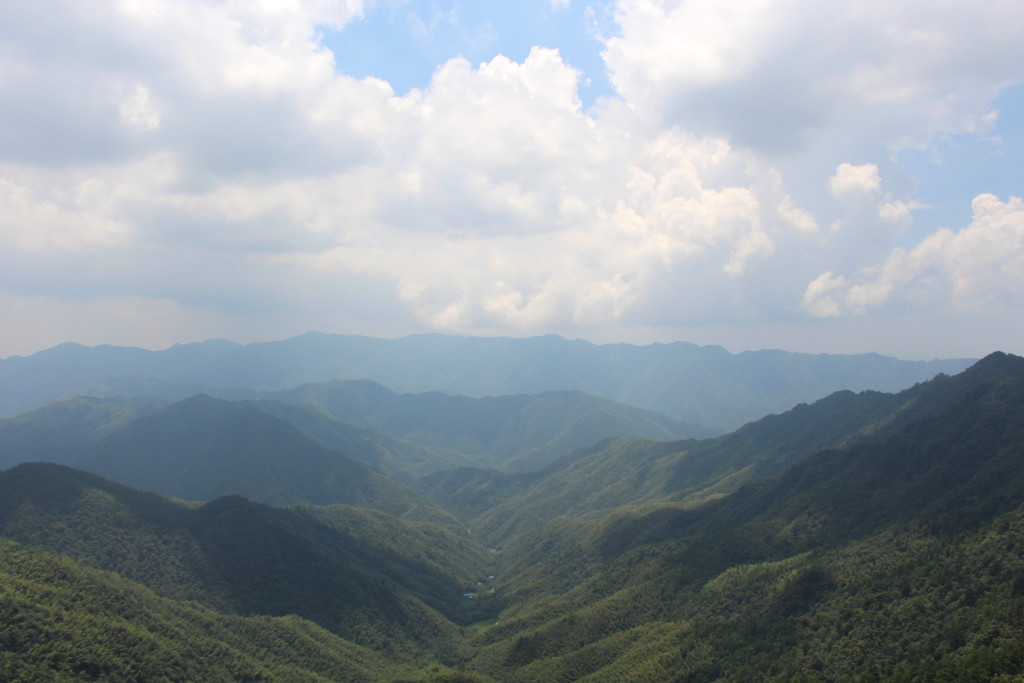
Shuangpai Yangming National Forestry Park

=== Landform ===
70% of the land in Mount Yangming is at an altitude above 1000 meters. The peak in this area named Wangfotai (望佛台) is 1624.6 meters high. The nearby mountains and the main river named Xiaoxiang in Hunan can be seen from the Wangfotai Peak. It has various kinds of grotesque rocks and abundant forestry.

=== Climate ===
Mount Yangming has a pleasant climate—14.2 °C on average in a year, with the highest temperature of 28 °C and the lowest of minus 5 °C. It receives 1700mm rainfall annually on average. There are 61018 aero-anions per cubic centimeter in the forestry area.

=== Natural resources ===
Mount Yangming has a great area of fertile soil and abundant natural resources. This is the reason why it was listed one of the natural conservation areas in Hunan province. There are a great amount and various kinds of bamboos and trees in Mount Yangming, including some rare species, such as pseudotsuga gaussenii flous. Endangered animal species, such as silver pheasant, as well as many precious herbal plants can also be found in this region.

=== Water resources ===
Yangming Water Power Station is established here since Mount Yangming enjoys rich water resources. The station generates a total amount of 156.26 million kilowatt hour per year.

== Popular attractions ==
=== The legend of the origin ===
There is a legend story for the origin of Mount Yangming passed on among the folks. Long time ago, two gods who governed the land entered into an area of land known as Mount Yangming today. They found here was covered by heavy fog all the time. They were twins and the old one named Zheng Yilang while the younger one named Zheng Erlang. They looked at the ground and wished to find a dragon. The old one took a long needle and walked above the ground, and the young one held a button-like coin and walked in the middle of the ground. Needle would drop every three steps. If the needle accidentally dropped into the hole of the coin, the place was proved to be an excellent place. Although the twins had great talents, they could not pass the heavy fog and go inside. The brothers burned the candles and paper money and knelt to pray, "Is this a place for human talents, for gods, or for Buddhas? Please, show us, otherwise we will die with disappointment." After three days and three nights' prayer, they sincerely touched the Jade Emperor, who cleared the mist and cloud for the twin brothers. They saw two dragons in broad daylight, one was a "Yellow Dragon" located in the North while another one was a "Green Dragon" in the South. These two dragons settled in the mountain ridges and met at the giant "Pearl". This was the place that Dayu once subdued these two dragons. What a grant sight of "Two Dragons Played with A Pearl". What an excellent place for human, for gods, for Buddhas. Two brothers appreciated the sight for a while and knelt down and kowtowed for three times. When they were going to leave, they found that this place was especially shady while other places were all under the bright sunshine. They discussed and decided to do a good thing for this land. They knelt down again and prayed to the gods for sunlight and sun-heat. Jade Emperor accepted their request and sent Sun-God came down to the earth. Sun-God hung a heaven lantern over the land and named this land " Mount Yangming". Since then, Yangming was the first place that exposed to the sunshine. The past Yongzhou Chronicle once recorded, "Yangming was bright before other place caught the first ray of sunrise...".

=== Wanshou Temple (Temple of Longevity) ===
Wanshou temple was built in the Song dynasty and was reconstructed during the Ming dynasty. It stands at an altitude of 1357 meters on a granite slope and covers an area of 5000 square kilometers. It is one of the provincial protected cultural relics and historical sites. There is an old well behind the temple, which will neither overflow while raining nor dry up after long drought. The water from the well is clear and tastes sweet. In 1550, the twenty-seventh year of the Jiajing period in the Qing dynasty, a 39-year-old Chan master (an honorific title for Buddhist monks) successfully cultivated himself into a Buddha and thus Mount Yangming became a blessed land. The Wanshou Temple attracts over 100 million religious people from nearby provinces each year. People come here for blessings from the Buddhas.
