= Gao Yinxian =

- Born: 高银仙 c. 1902
- Died: February 4, 1990
- Occupations: Linguist and writer
- Known for: Speaker and writer of Nüshu

Gao Yinxian (高银仙) (c. 1902 – February 4, 1990), an inhabitant of Jiangyong County, Hunan province, China, was the eldest of seven so-called sisters who could write Nüshu. She and Yang Huanyi, the last proficient speaker and writer of Nüshu, learned Nüshu at the same time for 3 years when she was young and a deep friendship was formed.

== Family ==
Her father died when she was nine years old, while her mother lived to over 70 years old. She had one younger sister and four younger brothers. Only her younger sister, Gao Fangshen (高放生), is alive today. She married Hu Xinming (胡新明) at the age of 21 and had one son and two daughters. Her elder daughter was beaten to death by the Japanese during the war. The younger daughter died in 1953, survived by her brother Hu Xiren (胡锡仁). Hu has one grandson and four granddaughters. He is the head of Xinwu Village.

== Biography ==
Gao Yinxian learned Nüshu when she was a girl. Considering Nüshu useful to convey thoughts, she started to learn it from her aunt and other sisters. After her marriage, she wrote down her thoughts in Nüshu during her leisure time. During the 1960s, she made friends with 6 women and seven sisters were formed. The elder is Gao Yinxian, the second is Lu Yueying (卢月英), the third is Lu Shuyi (卢树宜), the fourth is Hu Cizhu (胡慈珠), the fifth is Gao Jinyue (高金月), the sixth is Ouyang Shanshan (欧阳姗姗) and the youngest is Tang Baozhen (唐宝珍). At that time, Gao Yinxian was over 60 and Tang Baozhen was over 50. When Gao was in her later years, Tang was her closest friend. Often, Gao would write Nüshu while Tang embroidered it the writing on handkerchieves. When Lu Yueying died, Gao wrote Nüshu for her and the papers were buried with her. After Hu Cizhu died, she burned over ten books of Hu following Hu's wish.

Gao was sincere, hard-working and economical in her life. She was skilled in embroidering and drawing. She often knitted flowery bands with Nüshu as patterns. She was virtuous, kindly and never quarreled with others, for which she had very high prestige in the village. Women turned to her whatever difficulty they met with. Many people even asked her to write Nüshu for them. Gao was always willing to sing Nüshu for guests when asked.

Her spirits were low in later years. Her daughter-in-law died of illness in 1985 and her sworn sisters died in quick succession. She could only write Nüshu with Yi Nianhua (义年华) to pour out her depression and sang Nüshu with Tang Baozhen for entertainment. During the last few years, Gao wrote hundreds of articles for investigators who came to research Nüshu.
