= Yangming Mountains =

Mountain range in Hunan, China

The Yangming Mountains (Chinese: 陽明山; pinyin: Yángmíng shān), historically known as Yanghe Mountains (陽和山), are a group of mountains located in Yongzhou, southwestern Hunan, also the series of mountains of Dupang Range. The mountains lie east of the Xiao River, The main range of the mountains are located in the northeastern Shuangpai County, its branches stretch to Lingling, Qiyang and Ningyuan counties. The peak of the Yangming Mountains is Wangfotai Peak (望佛台), 1,624.6 metres (5,330 ft), in the county of Shuangpai. It is home of Yangmingshan National Forest Park.
