= Yangming Mountain =

Yangming Mountain may refer to:

- Yangming Mountains (Chinese: 陽明山), located in Yongzhou, Hunan, series of mountains in Nanling Range
- Yangmingshan National Forest Park (Chinese: 陽明山國家森林公園), located in the Yangming Mountains, a national forest park in Shuangpai County, Hunan
- Yangmingshan (Chinese: 陽明山國家公園), one of the nine national parks in Taiwan
