= Hidden Letters =

2022 documentary about Nüshu

- Official poster
- Directed by: Violet Du Feng; Zhao Qing
- Written by: Violet Du Feng; John Farbrother
- Produced by: Mette Cheng Munthe-Kaas; Jean Tsien; Su Kim
- Starring: Hu Xin; Simu Wu; He Yanxin
- Release dates: 6 June 2022 (Tribeca); 9 December 2022 (U.S. limited)
- Running time: 89 minutes
- Language: Mandarin

Hidden Letters is a 2022 Chinese documentary film directed by Violet Du Feng. It follows the lives of two Millennial Chinese women who study Nüshu, a script used exclusively by women in Jiangyong County, Hunan province, to communicate and commiserate over Chinese patriarchy.

The film premiered on 6 June 2022 at the Tribeca Festival. It received critical acclaim for its exploration of the resonances between the historical and modern role of women in Chinese society, although a few critics wished for additional historical background. It was shortlisted for the 95th Academy Awards in the documentary category.

== Synopsis ==
Nüshu written in the Nüshu script

The film depicts the personal lives of two Millennial Chinese women who study Nüshu, a script used exclusively by women in Jiangyong County, Hunan province, to communicate and commiserate over Chinese patriarchy. The first, Xin Hu, is a tour guide at the Nüshu Museum who divorced an abusive husband. She forms a bond with He Yanxin, an elderly Nüshu master. The second, Simu Wu, a singer who lives in Shanghai, is the youngest government-designated "inheritor" of the language. She is engaged to a man from a rural family but later leaves him after he pressures her to give up her studies to take on a job and raise children. Both women encounter entrepreneurs and government authorities seeking to promote a sanitized version of the language and to commercialize it to brand products including "high-end potatoes".

== Production ==
The film was directed by Violet Du Feng and co-directed by Zhao Qing. It was produced in China, the United States, Norway, and Germany.

== Release ==
The film premiered on 6 June 2022 at the Tribeca Festival. It was shown on the PBS series Independent Lens in March 2023. It is being reviewed for the Chinese market.

== Critical reception ==
On the review aggregator website Rotten Tomatoes, 91% of 22 critics' reviews are positive, with an average rating of 8.2/10.

Dennis Harvey, writing for Variety, said the film offers "a meditative, finally upbeat pulse-taking of a sisterhood," with "a gently questioning perspective on whether the issues this now-quaint private language addressed retain currency in today's China, where economically driven progressive attitudes may as yet only superficially impact deep-seated cultural ones". Phil Hoad of The Guardian praised the film as a "haunting but slyly subversive documentary" that performs "a deft act of historical revival". Patricia Aufderheide wrote for Documentary.org: "Feng and Qing give us an uncommented but highly pointed close-up look at the contradictory meanings of Nushu today, from the perspective of the women they follow. They capture some extraordinarily revelatory moments, which need no parsing. The female participants permit them to capture their vulnerability, their insecurity, their doubts." Mazzy Oliver Smallwood praised the film's female gaze in The Austin Chronicle, writing that it "beautifully captures the deep grief of living under patriarchy, and the little moments where that grief rises to the surface". Damon Wise wrote for Deadline that "Unlike the majority of docs, Hidden Letters doesn’t really set itself a goal—it's more of a mosaic piece that, in its best moments, has the vérité feel of a late-'60s Maysles brothers movie".

Devika Girish gave the film a negative review in The New York Times, writing that its "attempts to connect the past and the present feel too glib, lacking the force of historical detail."

Hidden Letters was shortlisted for the 95th Academy Awards in the documentary category.
