= Nushu (Unicode block) =

- Range: U+1B170..U+1B2FF (400 code points)
- Plane: SMP
- Scripts: Nüshu
- Assigned: 396 code points
- Unused: 4 reserved code points

Unicode version history
- 10.0 (2017): 396 (+396)

Unicode documentation
- Code chart ∣ Web page

Nushu is a Unicode block containing characters from the Nüshu script, which is a syllabary derived from Chinese characters that was used exclusively among women in Jiangyong County in Hunan province of southern China.

An iteration mark for Nüshu is encoded in the Ideographic Symbols and Punctuation block at U+16FE1.

For technical reasons "Nüshu" is spelled as "Nushu" in the Unicode Standard. Nüshu characters do not have descriptive character names, but have names derived algorithmically from their code point value (e.g. U+1B170 is named NUSHU CHARACTER-1B170).

== Block ==
Nushu^{[1]}^{[2]} Official Unicode Consortium code chart (PDF)
	0	1	2	3	4	5	6	7	8	9	A	B	C	D	E	F
U+1B17x	𛅰	𛅱	𛅲	𛅳	𛅴	𛅵	𛅶	𛅷	𛅸	𛅹	𛅺	𛅻	𛅼	𛅽	𛅾	𛅿
U+1B18x	𛆀	𛆁	𛆂	𛆃	𛆄	𛆅	𛆆	𛆇	𛆈	𛆉	𛆊	𛆋	𛆌	𛆍	𛆎	𛆏
U+1B19x	𛆐	𛆑	𛆒	𛆓	𛆔	𛆕	𛆖	𛆗	𛆘	𛆙	𛆚	𛆛	𛆜	𛆝	𛆞	𛆟
U+1B1Ax	𛆠	𛆡	𛆢	𛆣	𛆤	𛆥	𛆦	𛆧	𛆨	𛆩	𛆪	𛆫	𛆬	𛆭	𛆮	𛆯
U+1B1Bx	𛆰	𛆱	𛆲	𛆳	𛆴	𛆵	𛆶	𛆷	𛆸	𛆹	𛆺	𛆻	𛆼	𛆽	𛆾	𛆿
U+1B1Cx	𛇀	𛇁	𛇂	𛇃	𛇄	𛇅	𛇆	𛇇	𛇈	𛇉	𛇊	𛇋	𛇌	𛇍	𛇎	𛇏
U+1B1Dx	𛇐	𛇑	𛇒	𛇓	𛇔	𛇕	𛇖	𛇗	𛇘	𛇙	𛇚	𛇛	𛇜	𛇝	𛇞	𛇟
U+1B1Ex	𛇠	𛇡	𛇢	𛇣	𛇤	𛇥	𛇦	𛇧	𛇨	𛇩	𛇪	𛇫	𛇬	𛇭	𛇮	𛇯
U+1B1Fx	𛇰	𛇱	𛇲	𛇳	𛇴	𛇵	𛇶	𛇷	𛇸	𛇹	𛇺	𛇻	𛇼	𛇽	𛇾	𛇿
U+1B20x	𛈀	𛈁	𛈂	𛈃	𛈄	𛈅	𛈆	𛈇	𛈈	𛈉	𛈊	𛈋	𛈌	𛈍	𛈎	𛈏
U+1B21x	𛈐	𛈑	𛈒	𛈓	𛈔	𛈕	𛈖	𛈗	𛈘	𛈙	𛈚	𛈛	𛈜	𛈝	𛈞	𛈟
U+1B22x	𛈠	𛈡	𛈢	𛈣	𛈤	𛈥	𛈦	𛈧	𛈨	𛈩	𛈪	𛈫	𛈬	𛈭	𛈮	𛈯
U+1B23x	𛈰	𛈱	𛈲	𛈳	𛈴	𛈵	𛈶	𛈷	𛈸	𛈹	𛈺	𛈻	𛈼	𛈽	𛈾	𛈿
U+1B24x	𛉀	𛉁	𛉂	𛉃	𛉄	𛉅	𛉆	𛉇	𛉈	𛉉	𛉊	𛉋	𛉌	𛉍	𛉎	𛉏
U+1B25x	𛉐	𛉑	𛉒	𛉓	𛉔	𛉕	𛉖	𛉗	𛉘	𛉙	𛉚	𛉛	𛉜	𛉝	𛉞	𛉟
U+1B26x	𛉠	𛉡	𛉢	𛉣	𛉤	𛉥	𛉦	𛉧	𛉨	𛉩	𛉪	𛉫	𛉬	𛉭	𛉮	𛉯
U+1B27x	𛉰	𛉱	𛉲	𛉳	𛉴	𛉵	𛉶	𛉷	𛉸	𛉹	𛉺	𛉻	𛉼	𛉽	𛉾	𛉿
U+1B28x	𛊀	𛊁	𛊂	𛊃	𛊄	𛊅	𛊆	𛊇	𛊈	𛊉	𛊊	𛊋	𛊌	𛊍	𛊎	𛊏
U+1B29x	𛊐	𛊑	𛊒	𛊓	𛊔	𛊕	𛊖	𛊗	𛊘	𛊙	𛊚	𛊛	𛊜	𛊝	𛊞	𛊟
U+1B2Ax	𛊠	𛊡	𛊢	𛊣	𛊤	𛊥	𛊦	𛊧	𛊨	𛊩	𛊪	𛊫	𛊬	𛊭	𛊮	𛊯
U+1B2Bx	𛊰	𛊱	𛊲	𛊳	𛊴	𛊵	𛊶	𛊷	𛊸	𛊹	𛊺	𛊻	𛊼	𛊽	𛊾	𛊿
U+1B2Cx	𛋀	𛋁	𛋂	𛋃	𛋄	𛋅	𛋆	𛋇	𛋈	𛋉	𛋊	𛋋	𛋌	𛋍	𛋎	𛋏
U+1B2Dx	𛋐	𛋑	𛋒	𛋓	𛋔	𛋕	𛋖	𛋗	𛋘	𛋙	𛋚	𛋛	𛋜	𛋝	𛋞	𛋟
U+1B2Ex	𛋠	𛋡	𛋢	𛋣	𛋤	𛋥	𛋦	𛋧	𛋨	𛋩	𛋪	𛋫	𛋬	𛋭	𛋮	𛋯
U+1B2Fx	𛋰	𛋱	𛋲	𛋳	𛋴	𛋵	𛋶	𛋷	𛋸	𛋹	𛋺	𛋻				
Notes: 1. As of Unicode version 16.0; 2. Grey areas indicate non-assigned code points

== History ==
The following Unicode-related documents record the purpose and process of defining specific characters in the Nushu block:

Version	Final code points (Note: Proposed code points and characters names may differ from final code points and names)	Count	L2 ID	WG2 ID	Document
10.0	U+1B170..1B2FB	396		N3353 (pdf, doc)	Umamaheswaran, V. S. (2007-10-10), "M51.22", Unconfirmed minutes of WG 2 meeting 51 Hanzhou, China; 2007-04-24/27
10.0	U+1B170..1B2FB	396	L2/07-293	N3287	Proposal for encoding Nüshu in the SMP of the UCS, 2007-08-13
10.0	U+1B170..1B2FB	396	L2/07-300	N3322	Anderson, Deborah (2007-09-08), Comments on Nüshu Proposal by the Chinese NB N3287
10.0	U+1B170..1B2FB	396	L2/07-303	N3337	Reply to WG2N3322 - UC Berkeley's comments on Nüshu, 2007-09-16
10.0	U+1B170..1B2FB	396	L2/07-315	N3340	Proposal for encoding Nüshu in the SMP of the UCS, 2007-09-17
10.0	U+1B170..1B2FB	396	L2/07-371		Proposal for encoding Nushu in the SMP of the UCS, 2007-10-11
10.0	U+1B170..1B2FB	396	L2/08-171	N3426	Revised Proposal for encoding Nushu, 2008-03-02
10.0	U+1B170..1B2FB	396	L2/08-154	N3433	Comments on N3426: Revised Proposal for encoding Nushu in the SMP of the UCS, 2008-04-09
10.0	U+1B170..1B2FB	396	L2/08-186	N3462R	Reply to N3433 and the explanatory revision to N3426, 2008-04-23
10.0	U+1B170..1B2FB	396	L2/08-302	N3463	Proposal for encoding Nushu in the SMP of the UCS, 2008-06-06
10.0	U+1B170..1B2FB	396	L2/08-311		Anderson, Deborah (2008-08-10), Feedback on Revised Nushu Proposal L2/08-302
10.0	U+1B170..1B2FB	396	L2/08-318	N3453 (pdf, doc)	Umamaheswaran, V. S. (2008-08-13), "M52.11", Unconfirmed minutes of WG 2 meeting 52
10.0	U+1B170..1B2FB	396	L2/08-338	N3497	Anderson, Deborah (2008-09-01), Comments on N3463: Revised Proposal for encoding Nüshu in the SMP of the UCS
10.0	U+1B170..1B2FB	396	L2/08-345	N3449	Review of Nushu Proposal, 2008-09-15
10.0	U+1B170..1B2FB	396	L2/08-412	N3553 (pdf, doc)	Umamaheswaran, V. S. (2008-11-05), "M53.01", Unconfirmed minutes of WG 2 meeting 53
10.0	U+1B170..1B2FB	396	L2/09-155	N3598	Proposal for encoding Nüshu in the SMP of the UCS, 2009-03-18
10.0	U+1B170..1B2FB	396	L2/09-170	N3635 (pdf, doc)	Ad hoc report on Nüshu, 2009-04-21
10.0	U+1B170..1B2FB	396	L2/09-234	N3603 (pdf, doc)	Umamaheswaran, V. S. (2009-07-08), "M54.18", Unconfirmed minutes of WG 2 meeting 54
10.0	U+1B170..1B2FB	396	L2/09-365	N3705	Endo, Orie (2009-09-05), Comments and Questions on N 3598
10.0	U+1B170..1B2FB	396	L2/09-417	N3719	A Quick Response to WG2n3705: Comments and Questions on N 3598 (Nushu), 2009-10-26
10.0	U+1B170..1B2FB	396	L2/12-362	N4341	Updated Proposal for encoding Nyushu in the SMP, 2012-09-10
10.0	U+1B170..1B2FB	396	L2/12-330	N4366	Everson, Michael (2012-10-19), Input on encoding Nushu
10.0	U+1B170..1B2FB	396	L2/12-370	N4376	Aalto, Tero (2012-10-24), Nüshu ad hoc report
10.0	U+1B170..1B2FB	396		N4442	Anderson, Deborah (2013-05-31), Comments on Nushu (N4376 and N4341)
10.0	U+1B170..1B2FB	396		N4451	Anderson, Deborah (2013-06-05), Mapping of Nushu characters (from N4376 and N4341) and Additional Comments
10.0	U+1B170..1B2FB	396		N4461	Aalto, Tero (2013-06-12), Nushu ad hoc report
10.0	U+1B170..1B2FB	396	L2/13-160R	N4472R	Everson, Michael; Zhao, Liming; Chen, Zhuang; Anderson, Deborah (2013-09-12), Code table and names list for encoding Nüshu
10.0	U+1B170..1B2FB	396	L2/14-012	N4513	Toshiya, Suzuki (2013-12-25), Comments on Nushu in WG2 N4484, /IEC 10646:2014/PDAM1
10.0	U+1B170..1B2FB	396		N4403 (pdf, doc)	Umamaheswaran, V. S. (2014-01-28), "10.2.1 Nushu", Unconfirmed minutes of WG 2 meeting 61, Holiday Inn, Vilnius, Lithuania; 2013-06-10/14
10.0	U+1B170..1B2FB	396	L2/14-050	N4533	Toshiya, Suzuki; Endo, Orie (2014-01-30), Additional Comments on N4484/PDAM1
10.0	U+1B170..1B2FB	396		N4556	Reply to N4513 and N4533 (Suzuki and Endo's comments on Nushu Encoding), 2014-02-22
10.0	U+1B170..1B2FB	396	L2/14-075	N4561	Aalto, Tero; et al. (2014-02-25), Nüshu ad hoc report
10.0	U+1B170..1B2FB	396		N4562	Toshiya, Suzuki (2014-02-25), Feedback To N4556 (Chinese Reply To N4513 and N4533)
10.0	U+1B170..1B2FB	396	L2/14-170		Anderson, Deborah; Whistler, Ken; McGowan, Rick; Pournader, Roozbeh; Iancu, Laurențiu (2014-07-28), "17", Recommendations to UTC #140 August 2014 on Script Proposals
10.0	U+1B170..1B2FB	396	L2/14-186		Suzuki, Toshiya (2014-07-29), Progress Report of Nushu Code Chart Review by Japanese Experts
10.0	U+1B170..1B2FB	396	L2/14-236	N4610	Suzuki, Toshiya (2014-09-02), Comments on Nushu in ISO/IEC 10646:2014 PDAM2 (WG2 N4569)
10.0	U+1B170..1B2FB	396		N4553 (pdf, doc)	Umamaheswaran, V. S. (2014-09-16), "M62.05d", Minutes of WG 2 meeting 62 Adobe, San Jose, CA, USA
10.0	U+1B170..1B2FB	396		N4626	Endo, Orie; Toshiya, Suzuki (2014-09-19), Comments on N4561 (Nushu Ad-Hoc Meeting Report in WG2#62)
10.0	U+1B170..1B2FB	396	L2/14-244	N4639	Theory and Rules of Nushu Character Unification, 2014-09-23
10.0	U+1B170..1B2FB	396	L2/14-247	N4647	Anderson, Deborah (2014-10-01), Ad Hoc Reports for Nushu
10.0	U+1B170..1B2FB	396	L2/14-177		Moore, Lisa (2014-10-17), "Nushu (C.5.1)", UTC #140 Minutes
10.0	U+1B170..1B2FB	396	L2/14-268R		Anderson, Deborah; Whistler, Ken; McGowan, Rick; Pournader, Roozbeh; Iancu, Laurențiu; Glass, Andrew; Constable, Peter; Suignard, Michel (2014-10-27), "14. Nushu", Recommendations to UTC #141 October 2014 on Script Proposals
10.0	U+1B170..1B2FB	396	L2/14-300	N4659	Anderson, Deborah; et al. (2014-11-25), Nushu Ad Hoc Meeting Report
10.0	U+1B170..1B2FB	396	L2/15-008	N4652	Suzuki, Toshiya (2015-01-12), Proposal of Nushu Code Chart based on WG2 N4610
10.0	U+1B170..1B2FB	396	L2/16-052	N4603 (pdf, doc)	Umamaheswaran, V. S. (2015-09-01), "M63.03f, 9.1.3, 9.1.4", Unconfirmed minutes of WG 2 meeting 63
10.0	U+1B170..1B2FB	396		N4690	Reply to GB comments on Nushu in ISO/IEC 10646: 2016 CD, 2015-10-17
10.0	U+1B170..1B2FB	396		N4689	Toshiya, Suzuki (2015-10-19), Request for the Reconfirmation of the Required Distinction in Nushu
10.0	U+1B170..1B2FB	396	L2/15-283	N4693	Anderson, Deborah (2015-10-20), Nushu Ad Hoc Report
10.0	U+1B170..1B2FB	396	L2/15-245	N4697	Everson, Michael (2015-10-22), Re-ordering Nushu following the disposition of comments on CD 10646 5th edition
10.0	U+1B170..1B2FB	396	L2/15-262		Disposition of Comments on ISO/IEC CD 10646 (Ed.5), 2015-10-26
10.0	U+1B170..1B2FB	396	L2/16-203		Moore, Lisa (2016-08-18), "B.11.3.2", UTC #148 Minutes
10.0	U+1B170..1B2FB	396		N4739	"M64.05h", Unconfirmed minutes of WG 2 meeting 64, 2016-08-31

== Fonts ==
As of 28 March 2024, 3 fonts are known to support Nūshu:

- Noto Sans Nushu.
- Noto Traditional Nushu.
- Unicode Nushu.
