= Lianxi =

Lianxi may refer to:

- Lianxi District
- Lianxi, Dao County
