= Yangming =

Yangming may refer to:

- National Yang-ming University, university in Taipei, Taiwan
- Wang Yangming (1472–1529), Chinese Neo-Confucian philosopher
  - Yangmingism, philosophical school of Neo-Confucianism
- Yangming District, district of Mudanjiang, Heilongjiang, China
- Yangming Station, metro station in Wuxi, Jiangsu, China
- Yangming Mountains, mountain range in Hunan, China
