= Dupang Mountains =

Mountain range in China

The Dupang Mountains (Chinese: 都龐嶺; pinyin: dū-páng lǐng) are series of mountains located between the middle western Guilin of Guangxi and the southwestern Yongzhou of Hunan Provinces, one of the Five Large Ranges in the Nanling Ranges. The Dupang Mountains generally runs southwest to northeast and stretch roughly 70 kilometres (43 mi), from Gongcheng, Guanyang Counties of the eastern Guangxi, to Jiangyong, Dao Counties of the Southern Hunan.

== Dupangling National Nature Reserve ==
The Dupangling National Nature Reserve (Chinese: 都庞岭自然保护区; pinyin: dūpánglǐng zìrán bǎohùqū) is a protected area at national level in China. It is located in the southwest of Yongzhou, along the main range of the Dupang Mountains. The protected area is bordered to the east by Qingtang Town (清塘镇) of Dao County and Qianjiadong Township (千家峒乡) of Jiangyong County, to the south by Yunshan Town (允山镇) of Jiangyong, to the west by Guanyang County of Guangxi, to the north by Shouyan Town (寿雁镇) and Xianzijiao Town (仙子脚镇) of Dao County. It has an area of 2,000 square kilometres (770 sq mi). The protected area mainly protects the most typical and representative vegetation and forest ecosystems in the subtropical transitional zone, it is a forest ecosystem of protected area approved to establish in April 2004 by the State Council.
