= Shunling =

Subdistrict in Ningyuan County, Hunan, China

Coordinates: 25°35′1″N 111°56′32″E

Shunling Subdistrict (Chinese: 舜陵街道; pinyin: Shùnlíng Jiēdào) is a subdistrict and the county seat of Ningyuan County in Hunan, China. The subdistrict is located in the centre of county, dividing a portion of the former Shunling Town (Chinese: 舜陵镇), it was formed in 2013. It has an area of 42.6 km^{2} (16.4 sq mi) with a population of 46,200 (as of 2013), and its seat is at Lengnan Rd. (Chinese: 泠南路)
