= Shuangbo =

Town in Hunan, China

Coordinates: 25°57′55″N 111°39′30″E

Shuangbo Town (Chinese: 泷泊镇; pinyin: Shuāngbó Zhèn) is a town and the county seat in the west central Shuangpai County, Hunan, China. The town was reformed through the amalgamation of Yongjiang Township (Chinese: 永江乡), Shangrenli Township (Chinese: 尚仁里乡), Pingfutou Township (Chinese: 平福头乡), the former Shuangbo Town and 3 villages of Wulipai Town on November 18, 2015, it has an area of 319.65 km^{2} (123.42 sq mi) with a population of 101,300 (as of 2015 end). Its seat is at Dalukou Village (Chinese: 大路口村).
