= Hongtangying =

Hongtangying 洪塘营瑶族乡 Hongtangying Yaozuxiang, Hongtangyingxu, Hung-t'ang-ying, Hung-t’ang-ying, hong tang ying yao zu xiang
- Township
- Hongtangyingxiang
- Location in Hunan Hongtangying (China) Hongtangying (Asia) Hongtangying (Earth)
- Coordinates: 25°17′16″N 111°48′34″E
- Country: China
- Province: Hunan
- Prefecture-level city: Yongzhou
- County: Dao County
- Time zone: UTC+8 (Time in China)
- Postal code: 425300
- Climate: Cfa

Hongtangying Yao Township (Chinese: 洪塘营瑶族乡) is the most remote of 3 Yao ethnic minority townships in southeastern Dao County, Yongzhou, rural Hunan, China. Hongtangying has at least 47 villages, with thousands of women and children. The town is located within the Jiuyi Mountains.

== History ==
In 1967, the Yao population of the township was assimilated into the dominant Han culture. In 1967, Pan Jiarui was the township's CCP secretary and he demonstrated his revolutionary mettle by establishing militias and calling several "four chiefs" meetings, during which he criticised some brigades. The production brigade (village) of Huangjiatang was situated in the northernmost portion of Hongtangying, bordering Gongba Village. Four members of a landlord's offspring, Yang Jieqiao's family were killed in the township in late August 1967, Yang himself managed to escape and sought refuge with relatives in the Miaoziyuan brigade of Jianghua County. In 1967, Hongtangying had a primary school located on mountainous terrain, at the time, being a school teacher was one of many civilian jobs that someone could be transferred to from the military.
