= Xiaopu, Jiangyong =

Town in Jiangyong, Hunan, China

Coordinates: 25°15′54.4″N 111°21′1.8″E

Xiaopu Town (Chinese: 潇浦镇; pinyin: Xiāopǔ Zhèn) is a town and the county seat in the north central Jiangyong County, Hunan, China. The town was reformed through the amalgamation of 3 villages of Huangjialing Township (Chinese: 黄甲岭乡), 26 villages and a community of Yunshan Town (Chinese: 允山镇) and the former Xiaopu Town on November 12, 2015. It has an area of 215.03 km^{2} (83.02 sq mi) with a population of 69,700 (as of 2015 end). Its seat is at Wuyi Rd. (Chinese: 五一路)
