= Yang Huanyi =

Last proficient speaker and writer of Nüshu script

Yang Huanyi 阳焕宜
- Born: c. 1909; Jiangyong County, Hunan, Qing China
- Died: 20 September 2004 (aged 96–98); Jiangyong County, Hunan, China

Yang Huanyi (simplified Chinese: 阳焕宜; traditional Chinese: 陽煥宜; pinyin: Yáng Huànyí; c. 1909 – 20 September 2004), a resident of Jiangyong County, Hunan province, was known as the last proficient speaker and writer of Nüshu script (women's writing). Many people believe the language originated in Jiangyong County. She was the last person who could natively recognize, read and write Nüshu.

When she was young, Yang learned Nüshu together with Gao Yinxian, the eldest of the seven sworn sisters who were the most authoritative speakers and writers of the female-only language, for three years. Before Yang got married, she and Gao already had become close friends. They cultivated a true and deep friendship and often corresponded with each other by Nüshu.

Yang attended the National Academic Research Seminar of Nüshu in 1991 and the World Conference on Women in Beijing in 1995. Her works about Nüshu have been collected by Zhao Liming, a professor of Tsinghua University and they were published in 2004. Jiangyong County offered Yang's living expenses and employed a maid to take care of her daily life with the purpose of rescuing and preserving Nüshu.

== Biography ==
During her childhood, Yang Huanyi learned some traditional medical practices from her grandmother and specialized in curing pediatric measles. Her father Yang Shiyang was an open-minded country doctor. Considering that people who had studied Nüshu were more civilized and well-educated, he encouraged Yang Huanyi to learn it. At that time, one needed to pay to study Nüshu, so a fee had to be paid for learning every new word. Poor as she was, Yang never gave up learning; she earned money by working part-time jobs as well as picking beans and peanuts for others. "I was so happy first to learn how to sing the songs and then how to write," Yang recalled.

At the age of twenty-two, she married a man who was two years older than she, as her parents demanded. After they had been married three months, her husband was bitten by a poisonous snake and died. Two years later, she married He Yuancun, who was a compulsive gambler. He was accustomed to leaving home and gambling day and night, taking no interest in his family's affairs and leaving everything to Yang Huanyi. Every time he gambled away his money, he would sell pigs and millet to pay back the debt. As a result, Yang's family was deeply indebted and had to struggle against poverty. Although Yang altogether had eight children, only two sons and one daughter survived infancy for lack of cure and medicines and her second husband died later. Raising three children alone was difficult, and she would seek solace and distraction by writing and chanting Nüshu during her spare time.

At that time, most females were illiterate and considered the property of men. Women who learned Nüshu could share their feelings and experiences with other women in their own language. In 2002 Yang told the Los Angeles Times, "When I learned Nüshu, it was meant to exchange our thoughts and letters with friends and sisters. We wrote what was in our hearts and our true feelings."

== Visit to Beijing ==
In 1995, she attended the Fourth World Conference on Women in Beijing. This was the first time that Yang traveled far from her home and the first time the 86-year-old woman got on a train. She was extremely excited all the way, repeating that taking a train was comfortable because it was fast and steady. In this international conference, Ji Xianlin, Zhou Youguang, Liu Naihe, and other prominent academic scholars were also present. Yang wrote and sang Nüshu during the conference, thoroughly presenting its charm as well as the wisdom and creativity of oriental working women to the conferees.

When Yang Huanyi was in Beijing, she paid a visit to the Summer Palace, went to the Tiananmen Gate and came to the Memorial Hall of Chairman Mao Zedong. To look at her Hunan fellow-townsman had been the first thing Yang wanted to do after she arrived in the capital.

== About her age ==
The age of Yang is not exactly known. When a journalist of the Xinhua News Agency interviewed Yang at her home in 2002, Yang said that she was ninety-four years old. By that count, she was 96 when she died in 2004. However, on the other side, her age was recorded officially as 98 by Jiangyong County. Nüshu expert Zhao Liming believes that Yang was born in 1909.

== Contributions ==
By the end of the 20th century, after other users of Nushu had died, Yang was the only proficient user of Nüshu. Yang was called one of the "Living Fossils of Nüshu", especially after Gao Yinxian and Yi Nianhua, who were also the inheritors of Nüshu, died. Yang's work has been preserved to let people know and understand Nüshu. Yang was a key figure in rescuing and protecting the unique cultural heritage Nüshu. Additionally, Yang's death marks the disappearance of the female-specific language, which provides a method for women to share their innermost feelings through codes incomprehensible to men. Scholars once believed:" Yang is the last woman alive who grew up with nushu as a vital part of her girlhood and adult life, the sole survivor of a tradition that will die when she does." Nowadays, Yang's descendants are quite unfamiliar with Nüshu.

== Works ==
In 1990, Professor Zhao Liming, from Tsinghua University, went to Jiangyong County to conduct research on Nüshu. As soon as they met, Zhao and Yang formed an inseparable bond. Yang donated her complete works to Zhao, consisting of over 35,000 characters. During her research, Zhao found that owing to Yang's lacking knowledge of square Chinese characters, her works were free from Chinese characters' interference and this makes them more original to Nüshu. On the other hand, Nüshu characters are structured by four kinds of strokes, including dots, horizontals, verticals and arcs.

Professor Zhao decided to publish a collection of Yang's works. In January 2004, The Full Collection of Yang Huanyi's Nüshu Works was published with the help of some experts in Tsinghua University. The Collected Works of Yang Huanyi's Nüshu collects Yang Huanyi's Nüshu works along with their Chinese translations. Writings include Yang's autobiography as well as laments, songs about making friends, marriage songs, folk songs, legends, translations, letters and so on.
