= Lianxi, Dao County =

Subdistrict in Dao, Yongzhou, Hunan, China

Coordinates: 25°32′3.5″N 111°35′7.4″E

Lianxi Subdistrict (Chinese: 濂溪街道; pinyin: Liánxī Jiēdào) is a subdistrict and the seat of Dao County in Hunan, China. The subdistrict is located in the central region of the county, dividing a portion of the former Daojiang Town (Chinese: 道江镇), it was formed in August 2010. It has an area of 18.2 km^{2} (7.0 sq mi) with a population of 68,000 (as of 2010), and its seat is at North Daozhou Rd. (Chinese: 道州北路)
