= Nüshu =

Chinese script used by Yao women

Nüshu 𛆁𛈬
- "Nüshu" written in Nüshu
- Script type: Syllabary
- Status: obsolescent in 2004
- Direction: top-to-bottom, right-to-left
- Region: Jiangyong County
- Languages: Xiangnan Tuhua

Related scripts
- Parent systems: Oracle bone script: Bronze script; Seal script; Clerical script; Regular script; Nüshu

ISO 15924
- ISO 15924: Nshu (499), Nüshu

Unicode
- Unicode alias: Nushu
- Unicode range: U+1B170–U+1B2FF Nushu; U+16FE0–U+16FFF Ideographic Symbols and Punctuation

Nüshu
- Traditional Chinese: 女書
- Simplified Chinese: 女书
- Literal meaning: women's writing
Transcriptions
Standard Mandarin
- Hanyu Pinyin: Nǚshū
- Bopomofo: ㄋㄩˇ ㄕㄨ
- Wade–Giles: Nü^{3}-shu^{1}
- IPA: [nỳ.ʂú]
Yue: Cantonese
- Yale Romanization: Néuihsyū
- Jyutping: neoi5 syu1
- IPA: [nɵɥ˩˧.sy˥]

Nüshu (𛆁𛈬; simplified Chinese: 女书; traditional Chinese: 女書; pinyin: Nǚshū; [ny˨˩˨ʂu˦]; 'women's script') is a syllabic script derived from Chinese characters that was used by ethnic Yao women for several centuries in Jiangyong, a county within the southern Chinese province of Hunan. From the early 21st century there have been official efforts to revitalise the script, as well as indications of renewed interest among the wider public.

Nüshu is phonetic, with each of its approximately 600–700 characters representing a syllable. Nüshu works were a way for women to express their thoughts and feelings and establish connections with an empathetic community. Typically a group of three or four young, non-related women would pledge friendship by singing songs and writing letters in Nüshu to each other. At the time, women were typically not taught to read and write the mainstream Chinese script.

It is not known when Nüshu came into being, but it seems to have reached its peak during the latter part of the Qing dynasty (1644–1911). To preserve the script as an intangible cultural heritage, Chinese authorities established a Nüshu museum in 2002 and designated "Nüshu transmitters" starting in 2003. Fears that the features of the script are being distorted by the effort of marketing it for the tourist industry were highlighted by the 2022 documentary Hidden Letters.

== Features and adoption ==
Nüshu was used to write a distinct Chinese variety known as Xiangnan Tuhua that is spoken by the sinicized Yao people of the Xiao River and Yongming River region of northern Jiangyong, Hunan. This dialect, which differs enough from those of other parts of Hunan that there is little mutual intelligibility, is known to its speakers as [tifɯə] 'Dong language'. There are differing opinions on the classification of Xiangnan Tuhua, as it has features of several different Chinese varieties. Some scholars classify it under Xiang Chinese or Pinghua, and other scholars consider it a hybrid dialect. Most Jiangyong residents are bilingual in Xiangnan Tuhua and the Hunan dialect of Southwestern Mandarin. Xiangnan Tuhua was only written using Nüshu, and it was not used to write other languages, such as the Southwestern Mandarin spoken in Hunan, or the local Yao language.

Nushu Distribution map

Unlike standard written Chinese, where each Chinese character is logographic, representing a word or part of a word, Nüshu is phonetic, with approximately 600–700 characters representing Xiangnan Tuhua's spoken syllables. This is about half the number required to represent all the syllables in the language, as tonal distinctions are frequently ignored, making it "the most revolutionary and thorough simplification of Chinese characters ever attempted". Zhou Shuoyi, described as the only male to have mastered the script, compiled a dictionary listing 1,800 variant characters and allographs.

It has been suggested that Nüshu characters derived from italic variant forms of regular script Chinese characters, as can be seen in the name of the script, though some have been substantially modified to better fit embroidery patterns. The strokes of the characters are in the form of dots, horizontals, virgules, and arcs. The script is traditionally written in vertical columns running from right to left, but in modern contexts it may be written in horizontal lines from left to right, just like modern-day Chinese. Unlike in standard Chinese, writing Nüshu script with very fine, almost threadlike, lines is seen as a mark of fine penmanship.

About half of Nüshu are modified Chinese characters used logographically. In about 100, the entire character is adopted with little change apart from skewing the frame from square to rhomboid, sometimes reversing them (mirror image), and often reducing the number of strokes. Another hundred have been modified in their strokes, but are still easily recognisable, as is nü (女; 'woman') above. About 200 have been greatly modified, but traces of the original Chinese character are still discernible. The rest of the characters are phonetic. They are either modified characters, as above, or elements extracted from characters. They are used for 130 phonetic values, each used to write on average ten homophonous or nearly homophonous words, though there are allographs as well; women differed on which Chinese character they preferred for a particular phonetic value.

== History ==
=== Origins ===
The exact origins of Nüshu remain uncertain, as no written records document the genesis of this script. Gong Zhebing, a pioneer researcher of Nüshu, collected oral traditions and stories passed down through generations in Jiangyong County. These accounts reveal that the genesis of Nüshu is deeply rooted in local folklore and cultural traditions, blending myth and history.

==== Palace maiden's creation ====
One tale tells of a talented and beautiful woman from Jiangyong who excelled in singing and embroidery. Her idyllic life with her sworn sisters was disrupted when she was chosen to serve as a palace maiden in the emperor's court. Isolated and yearning for her home and companions, she invented Nüshu based on embroidery patterns to express her feelings. She sent letters written in this new script back to her sisters, teaching them how to interpret it. The script eventually spread among women in Jiangyong, becoming a cherished tool for communication.

==== Pan Qiao's creation ====
Another popular tale features Pan Qiao, a remarkably skilled young woman from Tongshan Village. By the age of three, she could sing; by seven, she mastered embroidery; and by eighteen, she excelled in every feminine craft. Pan Qiao was beloved by the women around her, who frequently formed sworn sisterhoods with her.

One day, while gathering grass in the mountains, Pan Qiao was captured by an imperial hunting party and taken to a distant county. Living in harsh servitude, she yearned for rescue. She eventually came up with an idea to devise a new script based on the patterns she used in weaving lace and creating shoe designs. She crafted one character daily over three years, ultimately producing 1,080 symbols. She used this script to write a letter, which was delivered back to her village. Her sisters decoded the message, discovered her whereabouts, and organized her rescue. Pan Qiao’s script was passed down through generations and is believed to have evolved into Nüshu.

==== Nine-Jin Maiden's creation ====
In another account, the inventor of Nüshu was a woman from Tongkou Village nicknamed the "Nine-Jin Maiden" (or "Nine-Pound Maiden") due to her unusually heavy birth weight. Renowned for her intelligence, singing, and embroidery, she created Nüshu as a way for her sworn sisters to communicate, as they were unable to read traditional Chinese characters. This script became their means of exchanging messages and nurturing their bonds of sisterhood.

==== Evaluating the legends ====
While these stories vary in detail, they share recurring themes of hardship, ingenuity, and the cultural traditions of Jiangyong women. Gong Zhebing speculated that Pan Qiao and the Nine-Jin Maiden may represent the same individual, as both stories originate from Tongkou Village and share similar elements. The palace maiden tale, while romantic, is often considered less historically plausible.

Scholars generally agree that Nüshu was likely created by a local woman skilled in embroidery and song, inspired by the artistic patterns in traditional needlework. The script played a crucial role in the lives of Jiangyong women, fostering emotional connections and serving as a medium for communication in a patriarchal society where literacy was often inaccessible to women.

=== Evolution and cultural context ===
It is not known when Nüshu came into being. The difficulty in dating Nüshu is due to local customs of burning or burying Nüshu texts with their owners and the difficulty in textiles and paper surviving in humid environments. However, many of the simplifications found in Nüshu had been in informal use in other vernaculars of Chinese since the Southern Song and Yuan dynasties (1127–1368). Use seemingly reached its peak during the latter part of the Qing dynasty (1644–1911).

Before 1949, Jiangyong operated under an agrarian economy and women had to abide by patriarchal Confucian practices such as the Three Obediences. Women were confined to the homes (through foot binding) and were assigned roles in housework and needlework instead of fieldwork, which allowed the practice of Nüshu to develop. Specifically, unmarried women, also known as "upstairs girls", often gathered in groups in upstairs chambers to embroider and sing. The practice of singing nüge (女歌; 'women's song') allowed young women to learn Nüshu.

=== Jiebai ===
One of the primary methods in which Nüshu use was perpetuated was through jiebai (结拜; 結拜; 'sworn sisters'). Jiebai formed a sisterhood, and enabled women to have companions. Unmarried girls often interacted with one another daily. Whether during group needlework, embroidering, or shoemaking, these girls worked together in an upstairs chamber. It was typical that they slept there together as well. "This arrangement led to the building of more intimate bonds through conversation, singing, and playing." Their poems and songs "embody their testimony to sisterhood". As they approached marriage, they wrote Nüshu wedding texts, also known as sanshaoshu, to the bride. Even after marriage, they kept in touch through letters.

=== Su kelian ===
Su kelian (诉可怜; 訴可憐; 'lamenting the miserable') is a genre of writing that "gave voice to Jiangyong peasant women's existence as vulnerable beings". To combat the feelings of powerlessness and helplessness, they turned to writing poetry. These feelings were often the subject of the poems written by the Nüshu women. By creating Nüshu, they were now able to communicate their emotions. Expressing their feelings through folk stories, songs, prayers, and more, gave women an outlet. The poems and songs are "filled with examples of women's hardships and misfortune".

=== 20th century ===
During the latter part of the 20th century, owing more to wider social, cultural and political changes than the narrow fact of greater Chinese character literacy, younger girls and women stopped learning Nüshu, and it began falling into disuse, as older users died. The script was suppressed by the Japanese during their invasion of China in the 1930s and 1940s, because they feared that the Chinese could use it to send secret messages. Nüshu was further censored during the Cultural Revolution (1966–1976), where it was seen as occult.

It is no longer customary for women to learn Nüshu, and literacy in Nüshu is now limited to a few scholars who learned it from the last women who were literate in it. However, after Yang Yueqing made a documentary about Nüshu, the Chinese government started to popularise the effort to preserve the increasingly endangered script, and some younger women are beginning to learn it.

=== 21st century ===
Nüshu Garden school, July 2005

Yang Huanyi, an inhabitant of Jiangyong and the last person proficient in this writing system, died on 20 September 2004, at the age of 98. He Yanxin, the last natural inheritor of Nüshu, died on 23 October 2025, at the age of 86.

To preserve Nüshu as a UNESCO Intangible Cultural Heritage, a Nüshu museum was established in 2002 and "Nüshu transmitters" were created in 2003. The language and locale has also attracted foreign investment for infrastructure surrounding possible tourist sites, including a $209,000 grant from the Ford Foundation in 2005 ($330,596 in 2023) to build a Nüshu museum, originally scheduled to open in 2007. However, with the line of transmission now broken, there are fears that the features of the script are being distorted by the effort of marketing it for the tourist industry.

The title of a Nüshu transmitter is given to someone who is proficient in Nüshu writing and singing and needlework, knowledgeable on local customs, practices civil virtues, and loyal to the Center for Nüshu Cultural and Research Administration. As of 2010, they are paid a monthly stipend of CN¥100 (100 (US$15.5) in 2023) in exchange for creating Nüshu works for the government and providing free copies of Nüshu works to local authorities. While recent academic interest in Nüshu has allowed for efforts in its preservation, it comes with the loss of women's agency over the presentation of their Nüshu works and their inability to directly control who the audience is.

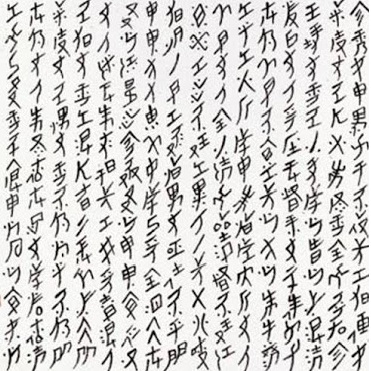
Nushu Script

== Works ==
A large number of the Nüshu works were 'third day missives' (三朝书; 三朝書; sānzhāoshū). They were cloth-bound booklets created by laotong, jiebai and mothers—and given to their jiebai counterparts or daughters upon marriage. They wrote down songs in Nüshu, which were delivered on the third day after the young woman's marriage. This way, they expressed their hopes for the woman's happiness after leaving the village, and their sorrow for having to part with them.

Other works, including poems and lyrics, were handwoven into belts and straps or embroidered onto everyday items and clothing. Other types of Nüshu works included ballads, autobiographies, biographies, and prayers.

== Research ==
The first explicit reference to Nushu in literature dates to 1931. Most existing manuscripts date to the 1980s, when researchers asked the remaining community to record texts from memory.

The Unicode proposal for encoding Nüshu, submitted by the China national body, accuses Chen Qiguang (Chinese: 陈其光) of including in his dictionary inauthentic information hybridized from Han characters.

== Cultural influence ==
As Nüshu was often practised in the private sphere, patriarchal ideas prevented it from being acknowledged in the public domain. These ideas deemed Nüshu irrelevant in the public world due to its perceived importance only being relevant in personal contexts while also asserting that culture in the public sphere was dominated by men. Contemporary artists have attempted to commemorate Nüshu through its translation. Yuen-yi Lo, a Hong Kong–Macau artist, uses drawings as a way to critique the modern separation between writing and drawing and translate the cultural practice of Nüshu into a visual art practice by and for women. Hong Kong based choreographer Helen Lai uses dance as a medium to critique the patriarchal media representation of Nüshu. She suggests that Nüshu is an innovative art form despite the media portrayal of it being a secret.

Chinese composer Tan Dun has created a multimedia symphony entitled Nu Shu: The Secret Songs of Women for harp, orchestra, and 13 microfilms. Tan Dun spent five years conducting field research in Hunan Province, documenting on film the various songs the women use to communicate. Those songs become a third dimension to his symphony, and are projected alongside the orchestra and harp soloist.

Lisa See describes the use of Nüshu among 19th-century women in Snow Flower and the Secret Fan.

== In Unicode ==
Nüshu was encoded in The Unicode Standard in version 10.0 published in June 2017, as part of the Nushu block (U+1B170–U+1B2FF). 396 syllabograms are defined. In addition, an iteration mark for Nüshu U+16FE1 𖿡 NUSHU ITERATION MARK is in the Ideographic Symbols and Punctuation block.

Nushu^{[1]}^{[2]} Official Unicode Consortium code chart (PDF)
	0	1	2	3	4	5	6	7	8	9	A	B	C	D	E	F
U+1B17x	𛅰	𛅱	𛅲	𛅳	𛅴	𛅵	𛅶	𛅷	𛅸	𛅹	𛅺	𛅻	𛅼	𛅽	𛅾	𛅿
U+1B18x	𛆀	𛆁	𛆂	𛆃	𛆄	𛆅	𛆆	𛆇	𛆈	𛆉	𛆊	𛆋	𛆌	𛆍	𛆎	𛆏
U+1B19x	𛆐	𛆑	𛆒	𛆓	𛆔	𛆕	𛆖	𛆗	𛆘	𛆙	𛆚	𛆛	𛆜	𛆝	𛆞	𛆟
U+1B1Ax	𛆠	𛆡	𛆢	𛆣	𛆤	𛆥	𛆦	𛆧	𛆨	𛆩	𛆪	𛆫	𛆬	𛆭	𛆮	𛆯
U+1B1Bx	𛆰	𛆱	𛆲	𛆳	𛆴	𛆵	𛆶	𛆷	𛆸	𛆹	𛆺	𛆻	𛆼	𛆽	𛆾	𛆿
U+1B1Cx	𛇀	𛇁	𛇂	𛇃	𛇄	𛇅	𛇆	𛇇	𛇈	𛇉	𛇊	𛇋	𛇌	𛇍	𛇎	𛇏
U+1B1Dx	𛇐	𛇑	𛇒	𛇓	𛇔	𛇕	𛇖	𛇗	𛇘	𛇙	𛇚	𛇛	𛇜	𛇝	𛇞	𛇟
U+1B1Ex	𛇠	𛇡	𛇢	𛇣	𛇤	𛇥	𛇦	𛇧	𛇨	𛇩	𛇪	𛇫	𛇬	𛇭	𛇮	𛇯
U+1B1Fx	𛇰	𛇱	𛇲	𛇳	𛇴	𛇵	𛇶	𛇷	𛇸	𛇹	𛇺	𛇻	𛇼	𛇽	𛇾	𛇿
U+1B20x	𛈀	𛈁	𛈂	𛈃	𛈄	𛈅	𛈆	𛈇	𛈈	𛈉	𛈊	𛈋	𛈌	𛈍	𛈎	𛈏
U+1B21x	𛈐	𛈑	𛈒	𛈓	𛈔	𛈕	𛈖	𛈗	𛈘	𛈙	𛈚	𛈛	𛈜	𛈝	𛈞	𛈟
U+1B22x	𛈠	𛈡	𛈢	𛈣	𛈤	𛈥	𛈦	𛈧	𛈨	𛈩	𛈪	𛈫	𛈬	𛈭	𛈮	𛈯
U+1B23x	𛈰	𛈱	𛈲	𛈳	𛈴	𛈵	𛈶	𛈷	𛈸	𛈹	𛈺	𛈻	𛈼	𛈽	𛈾	𛈿
U+1B24x	𛉀	𛉁	𛉂	𛉃	𛉄	𛉅	𛉆	𛉇	𛉈	𛉉	𛉊	𛉋	𛉌	𛉍	𛉎	𛉏
U+1B25x	𛉐	𛉑	𛉒	𛉓	𛉔	𛉕	𛉖	𛉗	𛉘	𛉙	𛉚	𛉛	𛉜	𛉝	𛉞	𛉟
U+1B26x	𛉠	𛉡	𛉢	𛉣	𛉤	𛉥	𛉦	𛉧	𛉨	𛉩	𛉪	𛉫	𛉬	𛉭	𛉮	𛉯
U+1B27x	𛉰	𛉱	𛉲	𛉳	𛉴	𛉵	𛉶	𛉷	𛉸	𛉹	𛉺	𛉻	𛉼	𛉽	𛉾	𛉿
U+1B28x	𛊀	𛊁	𛊂	𛊃	𛊄	𛊅	𛊆	𛊇	𛊈	𛊉	𛊊	𛊋	𛊌	𛊍	𛊎	𛊏
U+1B29x	𛊐	𛊑	𛊒	𛊓	𛊔	𛊕	𛊖	𛊗	𛊘	𛊙	𛊚	𛊛	𛊜	𛊝	𛊞	𛊟
U+1B2Ax	𛊠	𛊡	𛊢	𛊣	𛊤	𛊥	𛊦	𛊧	𛊨	𛊩	𛊪	𛊫	𛊬	𛊭	𛊮	𛊯
U+1B2Bx	𛊰	𛊱	𛊲	𛊳	𛊴	𛊵	𛊶	𛊷	𛊸	𛊹	𛊺	𛊻	𛊼	𛊽	𛊾	𛊿
U+1B2Cx	𛋀	𛋁	𛋂	𛋃	𛋄	𛋅	𛋆	𛋇	𛋈	𛋉	𛋊	𛋋	𛋌	𛋍	𛋎	𛋏
U+1B2Dx	𛋐	𛋑	𛋒	𛋓	𛋔	𛋕	𛋖	𛋗	𛋘	𛋙	𛋚	𛋛	𛋜	𛋝	𛋞	𛋟
U+1B2Ex	𛋠	𛋡	𛋢	𛋣	𛋤	𛋥	𛋦	𛋧	𛋨	𛋩	𛋪	𛋫	𛋬	𛋭	𛋮	𛋯
U+1B2Fx	𛋰	𛋱	𛋲	𛋳	𛋴	𛋵	𛋶	𛋷	𛋸	𛋹	𛋺	𛋻				
Notes 1.As of Unicode version 18.0 2.Grey areas indicate non-assigned code points

== See also ==
- Láadan
- Language and gender
