= Dao County =

Dao County 道县
- County
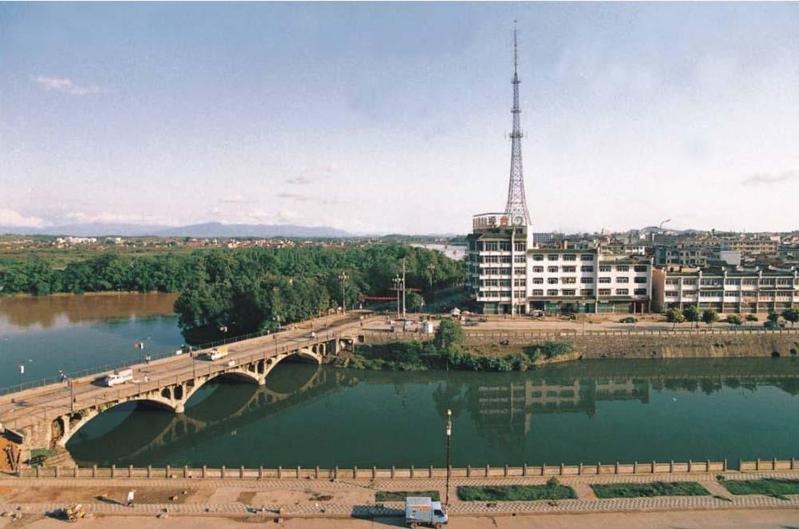

- Location of the seat in Hunan
- Coordinates: 25°31′37″N 111°36′04″E
- Country: People's Republic of China
- Province: Hunan
- Prefecture-level city: Yongzhou

Area
  - Total: 2,441.03 km^{2} (942.49 sq mi)

Population (2010)
  - Total: 605,799
  - Density: 248.174/km^{2} (642.766/sq mi)
- Time zone: UTC+8 (China Standard)
- Postal code: 4253XX

Dao County (simplified Chinese: 道县; traditional Chinese: 道縣; pinyin: Dào Xiàn) is a county in Hunan Province, China. It is under the administration of Yongzhou prefecture-level City.

Located on the southern margin of the province, it is adjacent to the northeastern border of Guangxi. The county borders to the northeast by Shuangpai County, to the east by Ningyuan County, to the south by Jianghua County, to the southwest by Jiangyong County, and to the northwest and the north by Guanyang and Quanzhou Counties of Guangxi. Dao County covers 2,448 km^{2} (945 sq mi), and as of 2015, it had a registered population of 802,800 and a resident population of 624,600. The county has 11 towns, four townships and 7 subdistricts under its jurisdiction, and the county seat is Lianxi (濂溪街道).

== History ==
Forces of the Taiping Rebellion stopped by Daozhou on their way to Changsha and Wuchang, Hubei. They convinced 20,000 locals to join the rebellion.

=== The Dao County Massacre of 1967 ===
The 1967 mass killing in Dao County, known as the Dao County Massacre, lasted 66 days from August 13 to October 17, 1967. It resulted in 4,519 dead, of whom 4,193 were killed outright and 326 were forced to commit suicide.

There are two principal features of this massacre. The first one is that it took place during the Cultural Revolution. The other is that nearly 90 percent of the victims were labeled as "class enemies", i.e., the so-called Black Five Categories (landlords, rich peasants, counter-revolutionaries, "bad elements," and rightists) and their family members.

== Administrative divisions ==
7 subdistricts

- Dongmen (东门街道)
- Futang (富塘街道)
- Lianxi (濂溪街道)
- Shangguan (上关街道)
- Wanjiazhuang (万家庄街道)
- Xizhou (西洲街道)
- Yingjiang (营江街道)

11 towns

- Baimadu (白马渡镇)
- Baimangpu (白芒铺镇)
- Ganziyuan (柑子园镇)
- Gongba (蚣坝镇)
- Meihua (梅花镇)
- Qiaotou (桥头镇)
- Qingtang (清塘镇)
- Shouyan (寿雁镇)
- Simaqiao (四马桥镇)
- Xianglinpu (祥霖铺镇)
- Xianzijiao (仙子脚镇)

1 township

- Lefutang (乐福堂乡)

3 Yao ethnic township

- Hengling (横岭瑶族乡)
- Hongtangying (洪塘营瑶族乡)
- Zhangyitang (审章塘瑶族乡)

== Climate ==
Climate data for Daoxian, elevation 192 m (630 ft), (1991–2020 normals, extremes 1981–2010)
Month	Jan	Feb	Mar	Apr	May	Jun	Jul	Aug	Sep	Oct	Nov	Dec	Year
Record high °C (°F)	26.3 (79.3)	31.2 (88.2)	32.9 (91.2)	33.8 (92.8)	35.1 (95.2)	37.5 (99.5)	39.3 (102.7)	39.5 (103.1)	38.2 (100.8)	36.5 (97.7)	32.7 (90.9)	27.5 (81.5)	39.5 (103.1)
Mean daily maximum °C (°F)	11.2 (52.2)	14.0 (57.2)	17.4 (63.3)	23.8 (74.8)	28.0 (82.4)	30.9 (87.6)	33.5 (92.3)	33.2 (91.8)	30.1 (86.2)	25.4 (77.7)	20.1 (68.2)	14.1 (57.4)	23.5 (74.3)
Daily mean °C (°F)	7.6 (45.7)	10.1 (50.2)	13.6 (56.5)	19.4 (66.9)	23.6 (74.5)	26.7 (80.1)	28.9 (84.0)	28.3 (82.9)	25.3 (77.5)	20.5 (68.9)	15.2 (59.4)	9.6 (49.3)	19.1 (66.3)
Mean daily minimum °C (°F)	5.1 (41.2)	7.4 (45.3)	10.8 (51.4)	16.2 (61.2)	20.4 (68.7)	23.8 (74.8)	25.5 (77.9)	24.9 (76.8)	22.0 (71.6)	17.0 (62.6)	11.7 (53.1)	6.5 (43.7)	15.9 (60.7)
Record low °C (°F)	−3.8 (25.2)	−2.6 (27.3)	0.1 (32.2)	4.2 (39.6)	10.7 (51.3)	15.0 (59.0)	18.9 (66.0)	19.8 (67.6)	13.4 (56.1)	5.4 (41.7)	−0.5 (31.1)	−5.4 (22.3)	−5.4 (22.3)
Average precipitation mm (inches)	82.4 (3.24)	89.6 (3.53)	174.2 (6.86)	215.2 (8.47)	264.2 (10.40)	223.9 (8.81)	145.9 (5.74)	141.2 (5.56)	52.6 (2.07)	67.4 (2.65)	79.8 (3.14)	57.8 (2.28)	1,594.2 (62.75)
Average precipitation days (≥ 0.1 mm)	14.8	13.8	19.1	17.5	17.3	16.7	11.7	12.7	8.1	7.3	9.6	10.3	158.9
Average snowy days	2.2	1.2	0.2	0	0	0	0	0	0	0	0	0.6	4.2
Average relative humidity (%)	79	79	82	80	80	81	74	76	75	73	74	74	77
Mean monthly sunshine hours	58.1	55.8	59.5	93.7	120.0	137.7	221.2	198.4	155.3	133.5	118.5	99.1	1,450.8
Percentage possible sunshine	17	17	16	24	29	34	53	50	42	38	37	30	32
Source: China Meteorological Administration

== Transport ==
- Luoyang–Zhanjiang Railway

== See also ==
- Fuyan Cave
- Yuchanyan Cave
