= Ningyuan County =

Ningyuan County 宁远县 Ningyüan
- County
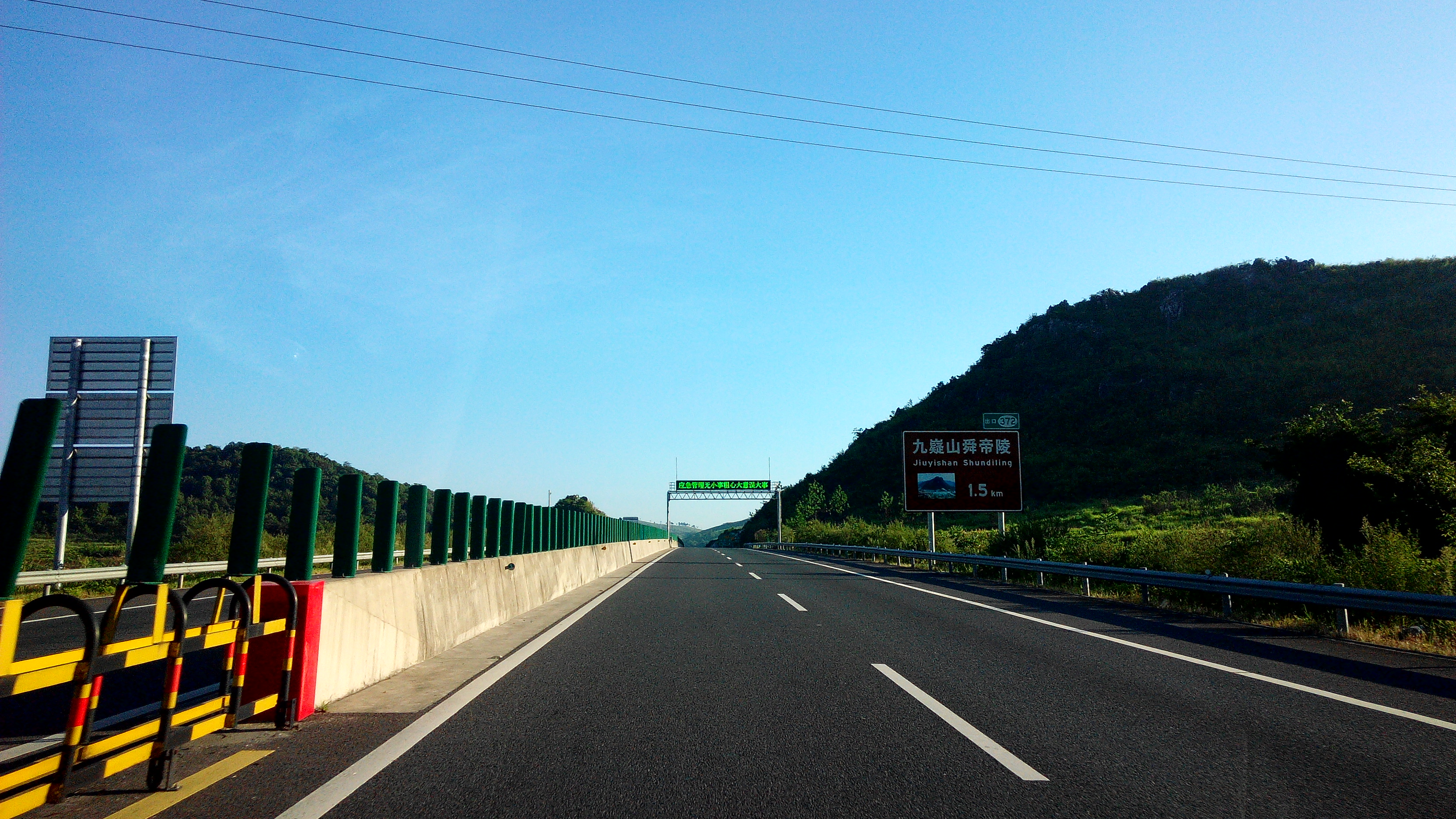
- Erenhot–Guangzhou Expressway passing through Ningyuan

- Location in Hunan
- Coordinates: 25°34′12″N 111°56′46″E
- Country: People's Republic of China
- Province: Hunan
- Prefecture-level city: Yongzhou

Area
  - Total: 2,488.87 km^{2} (960.96 sq mi)

Population (2010)
  - Total: 700,759
  - Density: 281.557/km^{2} (729.230/sq mi)
- Time zone: UTC+8 (China Standard)
- Postal code: 4256XX
- Languages: Xiangnan Tuhua, Standard Chinese
- Website: www.nyx.gov.cn

Ningyuan County (simplified Chinese: 宁远县; traditional Chinese: 寧遠縣; pinyin: Níngyuǎn Xiàn) is a county of Hunan Province, China. It is under the administration of Yongzhou prefecture-level City.

Located in the southern part of the province, the county is bordered to the north by Qiyang County, to the northeast by Xintian County, to the east by Jiahe County, to the southeast by Lanshan County, to the southwest by Jianghua and Dao Counties, and to the northwest by Shuangpai County. Ningyuan County covers an area of 1,806 km^{2} (697 sq mi), and as of 2015, it had a registered population of 871,200 and a permanent resident population of 726,700. The county has 12 towns, four ethnic townships of Yao people and four subdistricts under its jurisdiction, and the county seat is Shunling (舜陵街道).

== Administrative Divisions ==
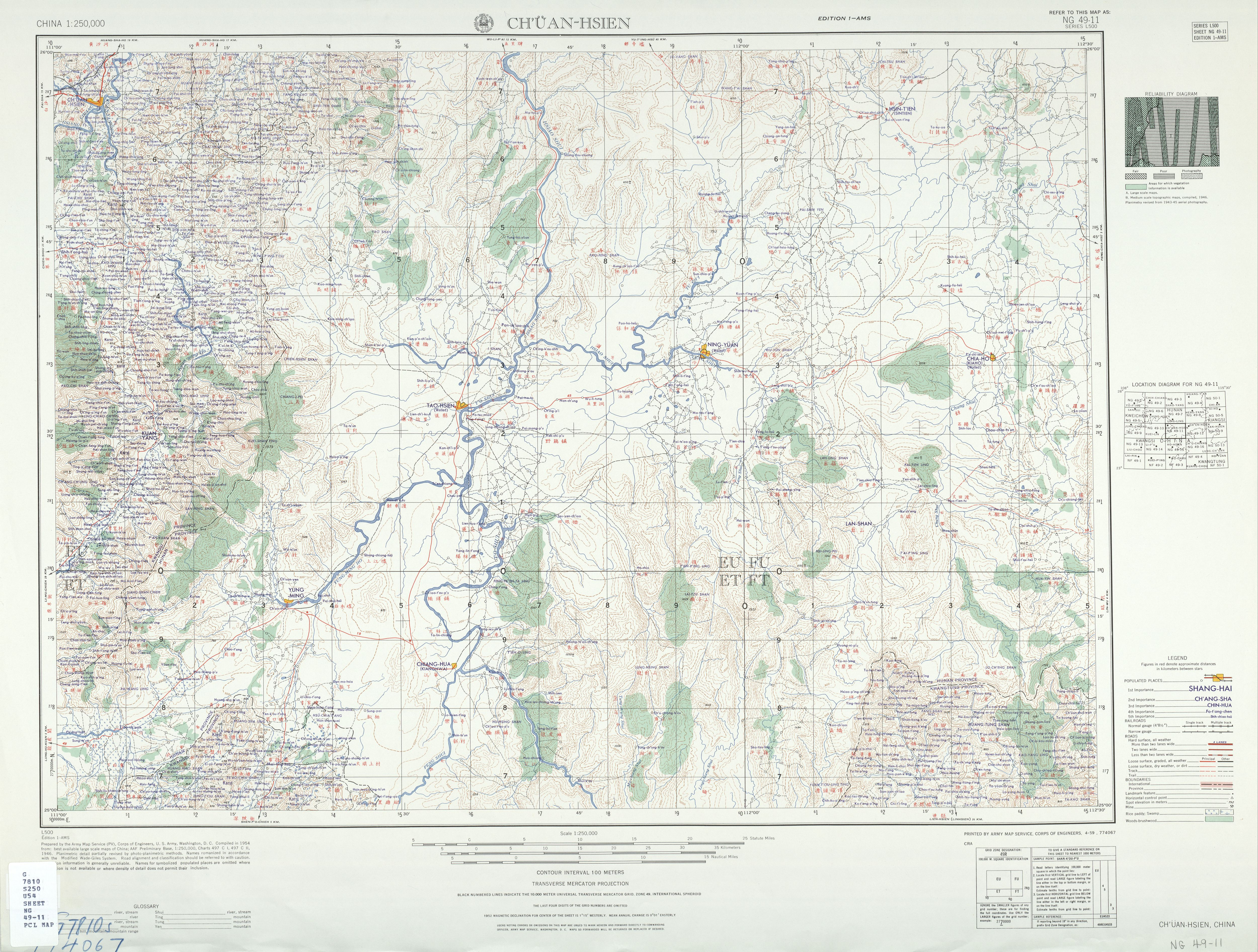
Map including Ningyuan (labeled as NING-YÜAN (Walled) 寧遠) (AMS, 1954)

20 township-level divisions of Ningyuan County (May 8, 2015 – present)
| 4 subdistricts | Dongxi (东溪街道) ·Shunling (舜陵街道) ·Tongshan (桐山街道) ·Wenmiao (文庙街道) |
| 12 towns | Baijiaping (柏家坪镇) ·Bao'an (保安镇) ·Heting (禾亭镇) ·Lengshui (冷水镇) ·Lixi (鲤溪镇) ·Qingshuiqiao (清水桥镇) ·Renhe (仁和镇) ·Shuishi (水市镇) ·Taiping (太平镇) ·Tiantang (天堂镇) ·Wanjing (湾井镇) ·Zhonghe (中和镇) |
| 4 Yao ethnic townships | Jiuyishan (九嶷山瑶族乡/九疑山瑶族乡) ·Mianhuaping (棉花坪瑶族乡) ·Tongmuluo (桐木漯瑶族乡) ·Wulongshan (五龙山瑶族乡) |

== Climate ==
Climate data for Ningyuan, elevation 244 m (801 ft), (1991–2020 normals, extremes 1981–2010)
| Month | Jan | Feb | Mar | Apr | May | Jun | Jul | Aug | Sep | Oct | Nov | Dec | Year |
|---|---|---|---|---|---|---|---|---|---|---|---|---|---|
| Record high °C (°F) | 26.3 (79.3) | 31.3 (88.3) | 33.8 (92.8) | 35.7 (96.3) | 35.8 (96.4) | 37.2 (99.0) | 39.9 (103.8) | 40.2 (104.4) | 38.2 (100.8) | 36.7 (98.1) | 32.9 (91.2) | 26.7 (80.1) | 40.2 (104.4) |
| Mean daily maximum °C (°F) | 11.1 (52.0) | 14.1 (57.4) | 17.6 (63.7) | 24.1 (75.4) | 28.3 (82.9) | 31.2 (88.2) | 33.9 (93.0) | 33.3 (91.9) | 30.1 (86.2) | 25.4 (77.7) | 20.0 (68.0) | 14.1 (57.4) | 23.6 (74.5) |
| Daily mean °C (°F) | 7.2 (45.0) | 9.8 (49.6) | 13.4 (56.1) | 19.2 (66.6) | 23.4 (74.1) | 26.5 (79.7) | 28.6 (83.5) | 27.9 (82.2) | 25.0 (77.0) | 20.1 (68.2) | 14.7 (58.5) | 9.3 (48.7) | 18.8 (65.8) |
| Mean daily minimum °C (°F) | 4.6 (40.3) | 6.9 (44.4) | 10.5 (50.9) | 15.7 (60.3) | 19.9 (67.8) | 23.2 (73.8) | 24.6 (76.3) | 24.2 (75.6) | 21.4 (70.5) | 16.4 (61.5) | 11.1 (52.0) | 5.9 (42.6) | 15.4 (59.7) |
| Record low °C (°F) | −3.8 (25.2) | −3.0 (26.6) | −0.5 (31.1) | 3.8 (38.8) | 11.0 (51.8) | 14.4 (57.9) | 18.7 (65.7) | 19.5 (67.1) | 12.5 (54.5) | 4.0 (39.2) | −0.6 (30.9) | −6.2 (20.8) | −6.2 (20.8) |
| Average precipitation mm (inches) | 78.9 (3.11) | 88.5 (3.48) | 166.4 (6.55) | 198.4 (7.81) | 219.9 (8.66) | 207.0 (8.15) | 130.0 (5.12) | 144.4 (5.69) | 60.9 (2.40) | 65.7 (2.59) | 74.3 (2.93) | 55.9 (2.20) | 1,490.3 (58.69) |
| Average precipitation days (≥ 0.1 mm) | 14.6 | 13.3 | 18.4 | 17.5 | 16.6 | 16.3 | 12.8 | 13.6 | 9.5 | 7.9 | 9.1 | 10.1 | 159.7 |
| Average snowy days | 2.0 | 1.0 | 0.2 | 0 | 0 | 0 | 0 | 0 | 0 | 0 | 0 | 0.5 | 3.7 |
| Average relative humidity (%) | 79 | 79 | 82 | 81 | 80 | 81 | 75 | 77 | 77 | 74 | 75 | 74 | 78 |
| Mean monthly sunshine hours | 62.2 | 62.0 | 63.2 | 101.7 | 132.4 | 152.6 | 233.9 | 205.0 | 154.4 | 134.5 | 123.0 | 105.4 | 1,530.3 |
| Percentage possible sunshine | 19 | 19 | 17 | 27 | 32 | 37 | 56 | 51 | 42 | 38 | 38 | 32 | 34 |
Source: China Meteorological Administration
