= Yangmingshan National Forest Park =

National forest park in Shuangpai County, Hunan

- 阳明山国家森林公园
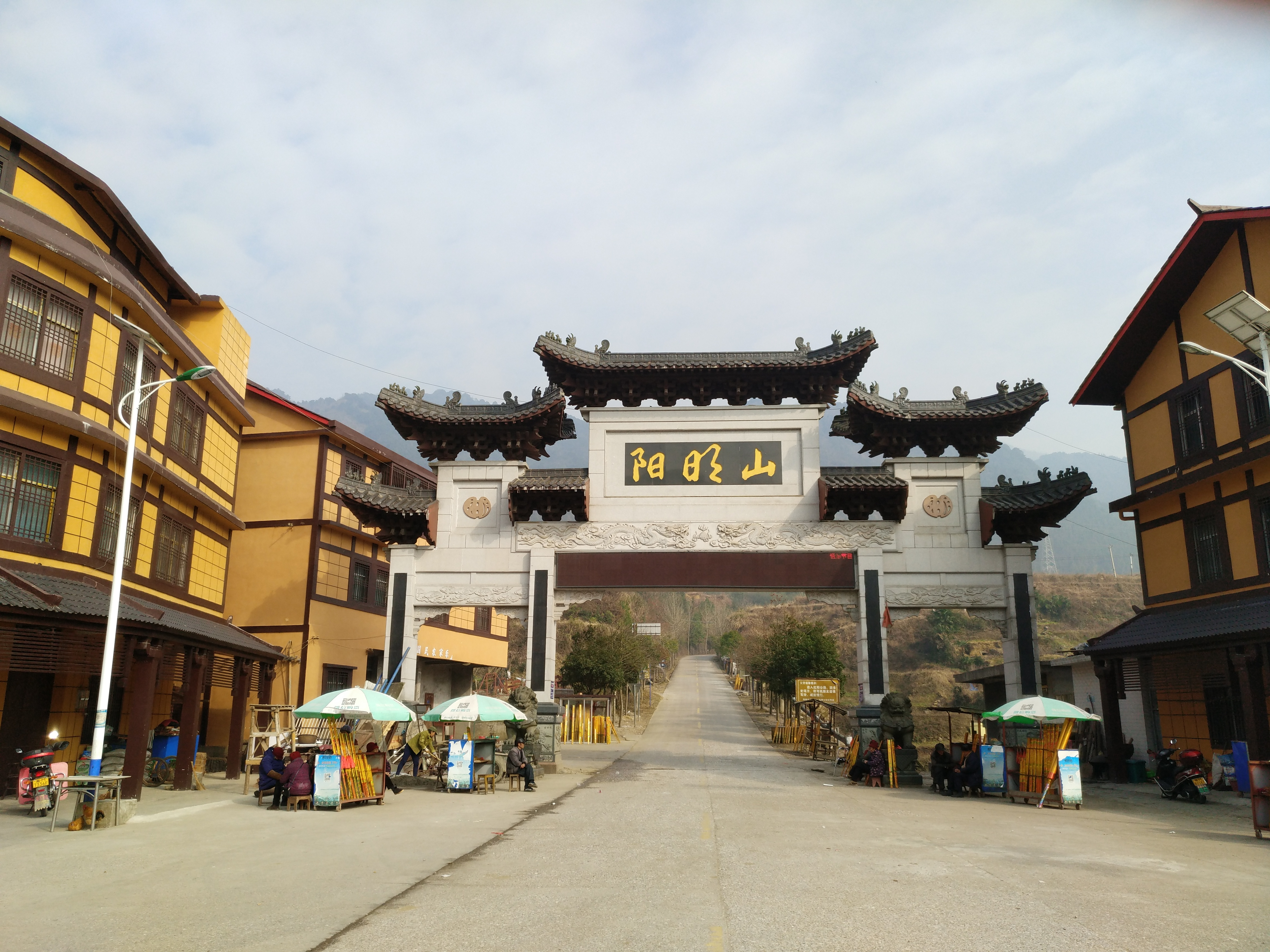
- Gate of Yangmingshan National Forest Park, in Yongzhou, Hunan, China.

- Location within Hunan
- Type: Public park, national park
- Location: Yongzhou, Hunan
- Coordinates: 26°03′57″N 111°56′46″E
- Area: 6,666,666.67-square-metre (71,759,402.8 sq ft)
- Created: 1992
- Operator: Hunan government
- Status: Open all year

Chinese name
- Simplified Chinese: 阳明山国家森林公园
- Traditional Chinese: 陽明山國家森林公園
Transcriptions
Standard Mandarin
- Hanyu Pinyin: Yángmíngshān Guójiā Sēnlín Gōngyuán

Yangmingshan National Forest Park or National Forest Park of Mount Yangming (Chinese: 阳明山国家森林公园; pinyin: Yángmíngshān Guójiā Sēnlín Gōngyuán) is a national forest park located in northeastern Shuangpai County, Yongzhou, Hunan, China. It covers an area of 6,666,666.67 square metres (71,759,402.8 sq ft). Located in the suburb of Yongzhou, it is bordered by Guilin on the South, Xiao River on the West, Mount Heng on the North, and Yongzhou on the East. Its main peak is 1,624.6 metres (5,330 ft) above sea level.

== History ==
In 1945 when Chiang Kai-shek presided a conference of senior military commanders, he visited the mountain in his free time.

In 1982 it was designated as a "Provincial-level Nature Protection Area" by the Hunan government.

In 1992 it was classified as a "National Forest Park" by the State Forestry Administration.

In September 2009 it was authorized as a "National Nature Reserve" by the State Council of China.

In 2012 it was categorized as a "4A-level Tourist Site" by the China National Tourism Administration.

In 2013 it was inscribed to the Prototype-zone of Ecotourism Attractions List by the Hunan government.

== Geography ==
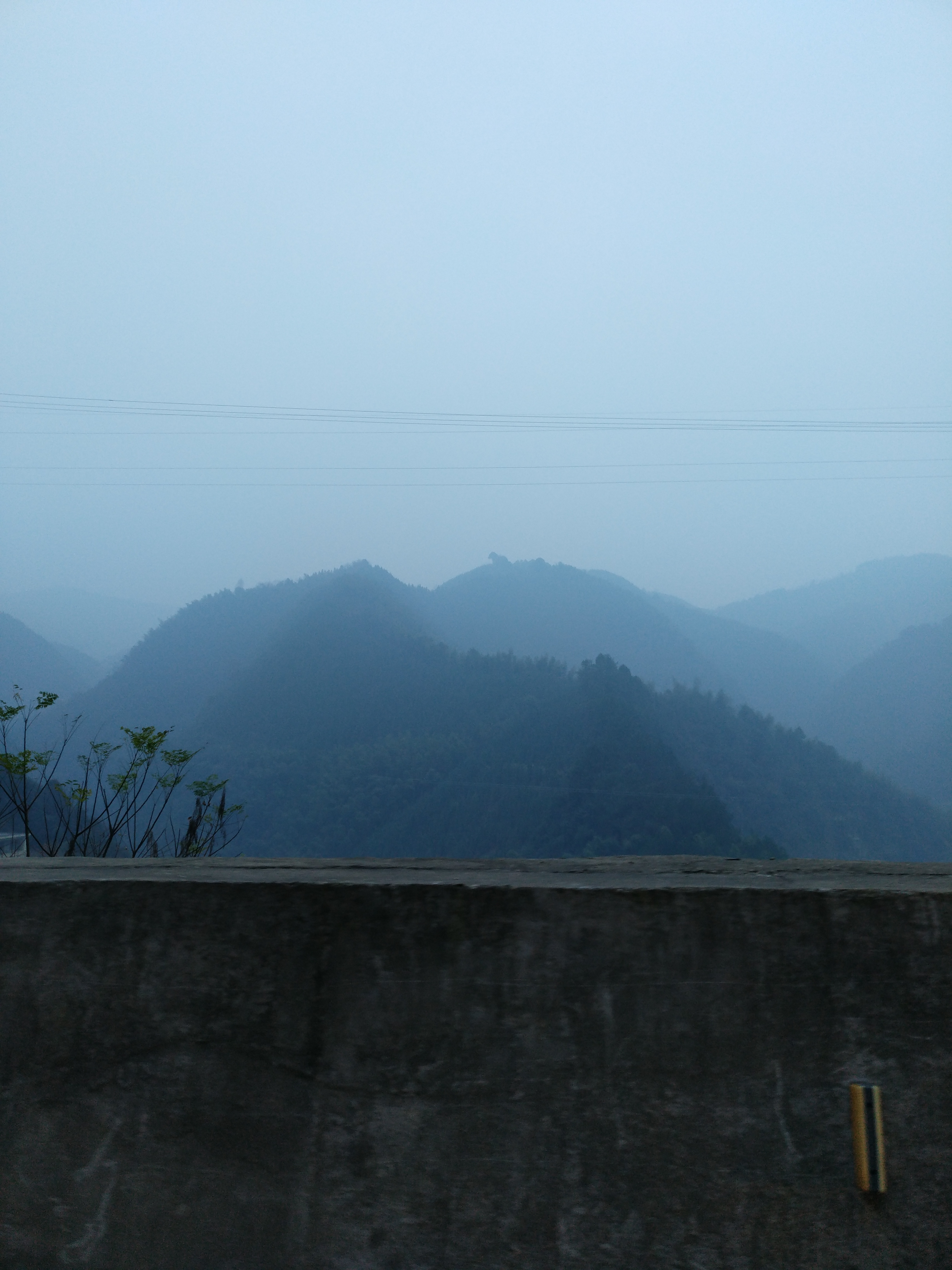
Yangmingshan National Forest Park.

Yangmingshan National Forest Park is dominated by sandstone.

Pseudotsuga sinensis predominate in the mountain of forest. It also abounds with Taxus chinensis, Cephalotaxus fortunei, Torreya grandis, and Quercus hypargyrea (syn. Quercus multinervis).

Animals that inhabit the Yangmingshan National Forest Park are pangolin, musk deer, silver pheasant, Chinese giant salamander, hare, and pheasant.

=== Rivers ===
River with headwaters: Huangjiangyuan (黄江源).

=== Climate ===
Yangmingshan National Forest Park is in the subtropical monsoon climate zone, with an annual average temperature is 12 °C (54 °F), total annual rainfall of 2,000 millimetres (79 in), a frost-free period of 150 days.

=== Tourism ===
Wanshou Temple (万寿寺) is a Buddhist temple located in the mountain, the temple was first constructed in the Song dynasty, rebuilt in the Ming dynasty.

A sea of azaleas (杜鹃花海) in the mountain in spring each year.

Memorial Pavilion of the Red Army (红军纪念亭). On August 23, 1934, Ren Bishi, Wang Zhen and Xiao Ke led they soldiers to wipe out a whole enemy of Nationalist and slept on stones.
