= Shuangpai County =

Shuangpai County 双牌县
- County
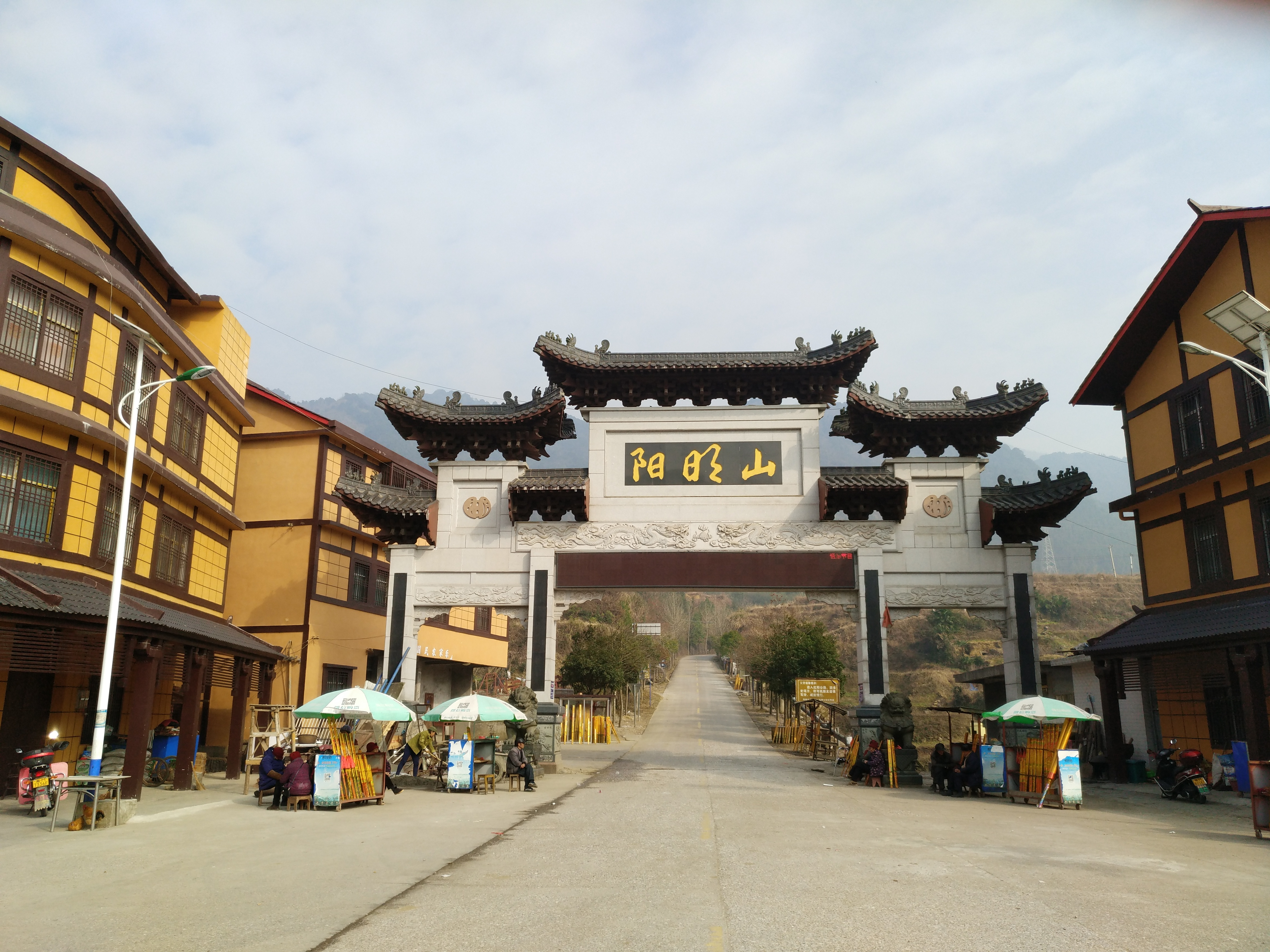

- Location in Hunan
- Coordinates: 25°57′43″N 111°39′32″E
- Country: People's Republic of China
- Province: Hunan
- Prefecture-level city: Yongzhou

Area
  - Total: 1,739.32 km^{2} (671.56 sq mi)

Population (2010)
  - Total: 163,274
  - Density: 93.8723/km^{2} (243.128/sq mi)
- Time zone: UTC+8 (China Standard)
- Postal code: 4252XX

Shuangpai County (simplified Chinese: 双牌县; traditional Chinese: 雙牌縣; pinyin: Shuāngpái Xiàn) is a county in Hunan Province, China, it is under the administration of the prefecture-level city of Yongzhou. Shuangpai is also the 3rd smallest administrative unit (after Shaoshan and Guzhang) by population in the counties and county-level cities of the province.

Located on the southern margin of the province, it is adjacent to the city proper of Yongzhou (aka Lingling and Lengshuitan District ), and lies to the eastern border of Guangxi. The county is bordered to the north and the northwest by Lingling District, to the east and the southeast by Ningyuan County, and to the southwest and the south by Dao County, Quanzhou County of Guangxi, respectively. Shuangpai County covers an area of 1,751 km^{2} (676 sq mi), and as of 2015, it had a permanent resident population of 202,400. The county has 6 towns and 5 townships under its jurisdiction, and the county seat is Shuangbo (泷泊镇).

== Administrative divisions ==
6 towns

- Chalin (茶林镇)
- Hejiadong (何家洞镇)
- Jiangcun (江村镇)
- Majiang (麻江镇)
- Shuangbo (泷泊镇)
- Wulipai (五里牌镇)

4 townships

- Daguping (打鼓坪乡)
- Lijiaping (理家坪乡)
- Tangdi (塘底乡)
- Wuxingling (五星岭乡)

1 Yao ethnic township

- Shangwujiang (上梧江瑶族乡)

== Climate ==
Climate data for Shuangpai, elevation 205 m (673 ft), (1991–2020 normals, extremes 1981–2010)
Month	Jan	Feb	Mar	Apr	May	Jun	Jul	Aug	Sep	Oct	Nov	Dec	Year
Record high °C (°F)	27.4 (81.3)	31.9 (89.4)	34.1 (93.4)	35.5 (95.9)	35.9 (96.6)	37.7 (99.9)	39.9 (103.8)	40.7 (105.3)	38.3 (100.9)	36.7 (98.1)	34.4 (93.9)	25.4 (77.7)	40.7 (105.3)
Mean daily maximum °C (°F)	9.9 (49.8)	12.8 (55.0)	16.9 (62.4)	23.4 (74.1)	27.6 (81.7)	30.6 (87.1)	33.9 (93.0)	33.1 (91.6)	29.3 (84.7)	24.1 (75.4)	18.6 (65.5)	12.5 (54.5)	22.7 (72.9)
Daily mean °C (°F)	6.5 (43.7)	9.0 (48.2)	12.7 (54.9)	18.6 (65.5)	22.8 (73.0)	26.2 (79.2)	28.6 (83.5)	27.6 (81.7)	24.2 (75.6)	19.2 (66.6)	13.8 (56.8)	8.4 (47.1)	18.1 (64.7)
Mean daily minimum °C (°F)	4.1 (39.4)	6.4 (43.5)	9.9 (49.8)	15.3 (59.5)	19.4 (66.9)	23.1 (73.6)	24.8 (76.6)	24.1 (75.4)	20.8 (69.4)	15.8 (60.4)	10.5 (50.9)	5.5 (41.9)	15.0 (58.9)
Record low °C (°F)	−4.4 (24.1)	−3.9 (25.0)	−0.5 (31.1)	2.7 (36.9)	8.4 (47.1)	13.5 (56.3)	17.3 (63.1)	18.7 (65.7)	12.4 (54.3)	3.7 (38.7)	−0.4 (31.3)	−5.8 (21.6)	−5.8 (21.6)
Average precipitation mm (inches)	76.7 (3.02)	85.3 (3.36)	163.1 (6.42)	166.3 (6.55)	218.2 (8.59)	220.1 (8.67)	151.9 (5.98)	140.5 (5.53)	63.1 (2.48)	64.2 (2.53)	74.6 (2.94)	54.7 (2.15)	1,478.7 (58.22)
Average precipitation days (≥ 0.1 mm)	14.8	14.5	18.9	17.0	17.2	16.6	11.9	13.6	9.1	8.6	10.4	10.6	163.2
Average snowy days	3.4	1.7	0.4	0	0	0	0	0	0	0	0	0.8	6.3
Average relative humidity (%)	80	80	82	80	80	81	74	77	78	77	78	76	79
Mean monthly sunshine hours	52.3	50.7	58.6	90.6	113.3	116.5	202.3	175.7	134.4	115.4	102.9	85.9	1,298.6
Percentage possible sunshine	16	16	16	24	27	28	48	44	37	33	32	26	29
Source: China Meteorological Administration
