= Jiangyong County =

Jiangyong County 江永县
- County
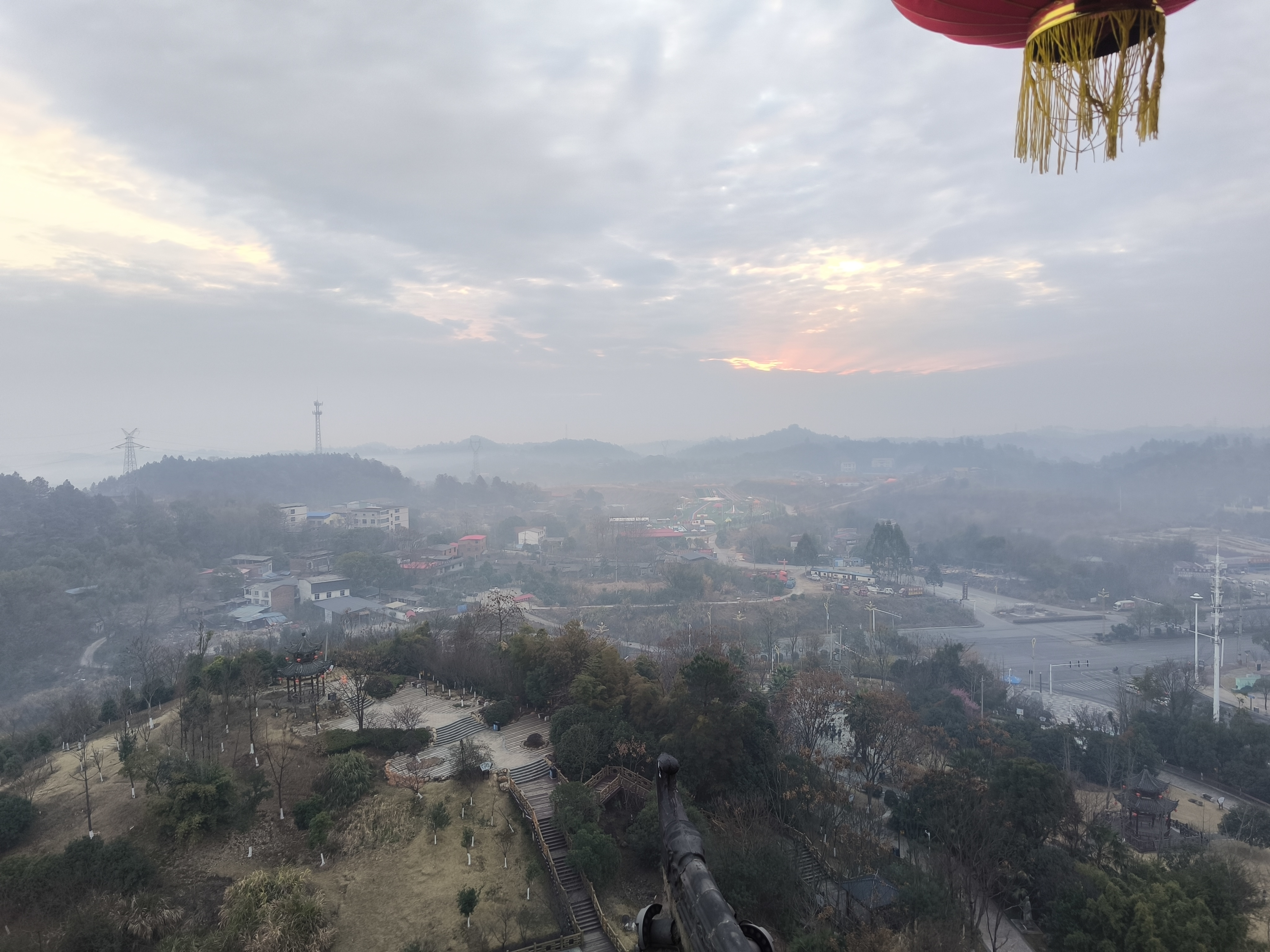

- Location in Hunan
- Coordinates: 25°16′23″N 111°20′35″E
- Country: People's Republic of China
- Province: Hunan
- Prefecture-level city: Yongzhou
- Seat: Xiaopu

Area
  - Total: 1,632.62 km^{2} (630.36 sq mi)

Population (2010)
  - Total: 232,599
  - Density: 142.470/km^{2} (368.995/sq mi)
- Time zone: UTC+8 (China Standard)
- Postal code: 4254XX

Jiangyong County (simplified Chinese: 江永县; traditional Chinese: 江永縣; pinyin: Jiāngyǒng Xiàn) is a county of Hunan Province, China. It is under the administration of Yongzhou prefecture-level City.

Located on the south margin of the province, it is bordered on the west by Guangxi. The county is bordered to the northeast by Dao County, to the southeast by Jianghua County, to the south by Fuchuan County of Guangxi, to the west by Gongcheng County of Guangxi, and to the south by Guanyang County of Guangxi. Jiangyong County covers an area of 1,627 km^{2} (628 sq mi), and as of 2015, it had a registered population (hukou) of 278,715 and a permanent resident population of 240,900. The county has 6 towns and four ethnic townships under its jurisdiction, and the county seat is Xiaopu Town (潇浦镇).

Nüshu script is a local script understood only by women in Jiangyong County.

== Township-level divisions ==
Jiangyong County administratively governs 6 towns and four ethnic townships:

6 towns

- Cushijiang (粗石江镇)
- Huilongyu (回龙圩镇)
- Shangjiangyu (上江圩镇)
- Taochuan (桃川镇)
- Xiacengpu (夏层铺镇)
- Xiaopu (潇浦镇)

4 Yao ethnic townships

- Yao Lanxi (兰溪瑶族乡)
- Yao Qianjiadong (千家峒瑶族乡)
- Yao Songbai (松柏瑶族乡)
- Yao Yuankou (源口瑶族乡)

== Climate ==
Climate data for Jiangyong, elevation 269 m (883 ft), (1991–2020 normals, extremes 1981–2010)
Month	Jan	Feb	Mar	Apr	May	Jun	Jul	Aug	Sep	Oct	Nov	Dec	Year
Record high °C (°F)	26.0 (78.8)	31.2 (88.2)	32.6 (90.7)	33.9 (93.0)	34.6 (94.3)	36.9 (98.4)	38.7 (101.7)	39.6 (103.3)	37.8 (100.0)	36.5 (97.7)	32.4 (90.3)	26.9 (80.4)	39.6 (103.3)
Mean daily maximum °C (°F)	11.3 (52.3)	14.0 (57.2)	17.3 (63.1)	23.4 (74.1)	27.6 (81.7)	30.3 (86.5)	32.7 (90.9)	32.8 (91.0)	30.0 (86.0)	25.4 (77.7)	20.1 (68.2)	14.3 (57.7)	23.3 (73.9)
Daily mean °C (°F)	7.4 (45.3)	9.9 (49.8)	13.3 (55.9)	19.0 (66.2)	23.2 (73.8)	26.1 (79.0)	27.7 (81.9)	27.4 (81.3)	24.8 (76.6)	20.2 (68.4)	14.8 (58.6)	9.4 (48.9)	18.6 (65.5)
Mean daily minimum °C (°F)	4.6 (40.3)	7.0 (44.6)	10.5 (50.9)	15.7 (60.3)	19.9 (67.8)	23.0 (73.4)	24.1 (75.4)	23.6 (74.5)	21.0 (69.8)	16.2 (61.2)	10.8 (51.4)	5.8 (42.4)	15.2 (59.3)
Record low °C (°F)	−5.9 (21.4)	−3.5 (25.7)	−2.7 (27.1)	2.9 (37.2)	9.2 (48.6)	13.1 (55.6)	16.5 (61.7)	18.0 (64.4)	11.3 (52.3)	2.4 (36.3)	−1.3 (29.7)	−7.7 (18.1)	−7.7 (18.1)
Average precipitation mm (inches)	78.9 (3.11)	85.7 (3.37)	160.8 (6.33)	214.1 (8.43)	256.5 (10.10)	255.1 (10.04)	154.8 (6.09)	139.6 (5.50)	61.4 (2.42)	61.1 (2.41)	72.9 (2.87)	54.7 (2.15)	1,595.6 (62.82)
Average precipitation days (≥ 0.1 mm)	13.5	12.9	18.5	17.0	17.7	17.7	13.9	13.4	8.5	7.2	8.6	9.7	158.6
Average snowy days	1.2	0.4	0	0	0	0	0	0	0	0	0	0.4	2
Average relative humidity (%)	79	80	83	82	82	84	81	80	77	74	75	74	79
Mean monthly sunshine hours	59.4	53.1	54.8	77.2	106.9	123.1	199.9	195.2	164.6	144.2	120.3	100.1	1,398.8
Percentage possible sunshine	18	17	15	20	26	30	48	49	45	41	37	31	31
Source: China Meteorological Administration
